= Rodez =

Prefecture and commune in Occitania, France

Rodez Rodés (Occitan)
- Prefecture and commune
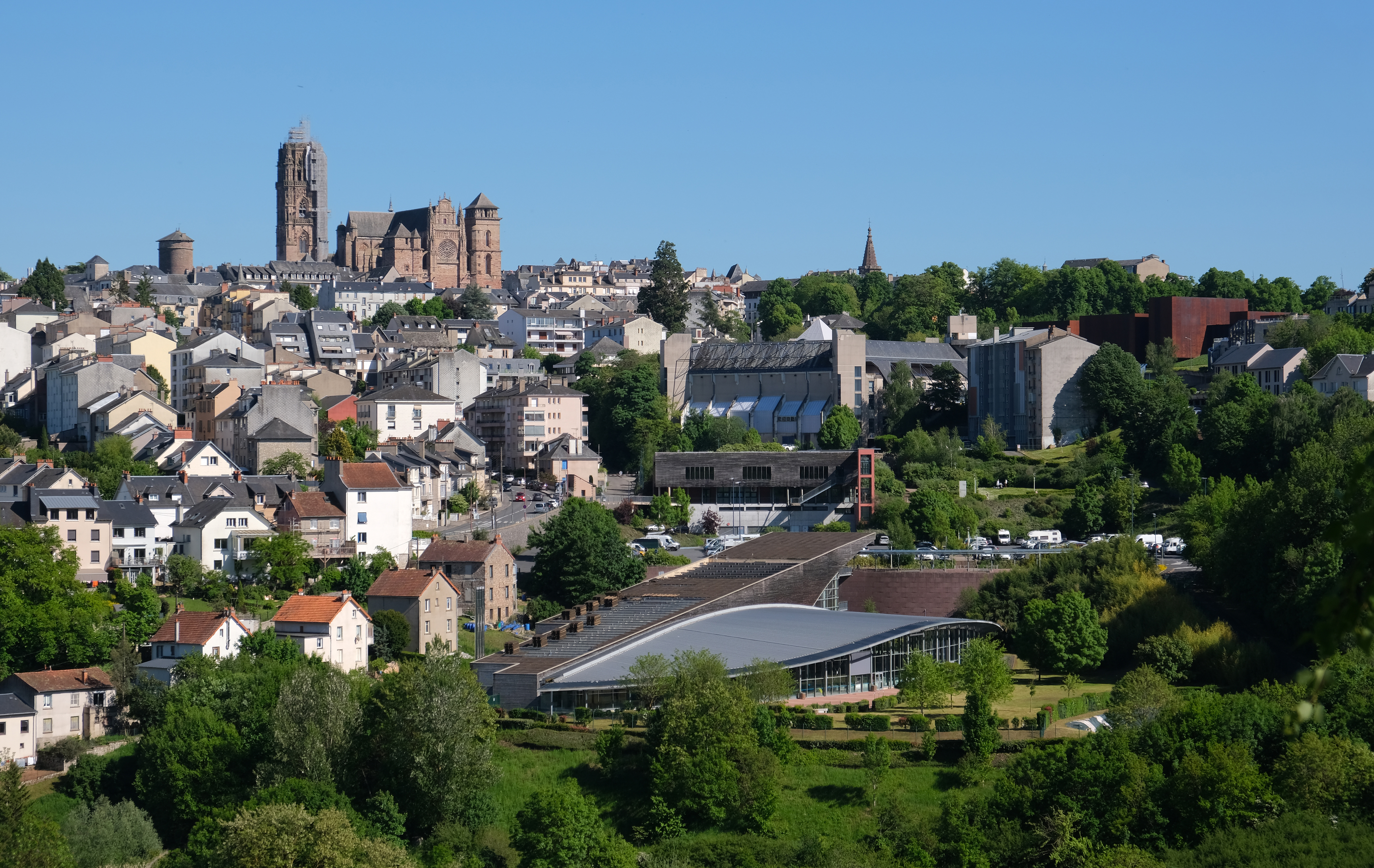
- A general view of Rodez

- Coat of arms
- Location of Rodez
- Location within France Location within Occitanie
- Coordinates: 44°21′02″N 2°34′30″E
- Country: France
- Region: Occitania
- Department: Aveyron
- Arrondissement: Rodez
- Canton: Rodez-1, Rodez-2 and Rodez-Onet
- Intercommunality: Rodez Agglomération

Government
  - Mayor (2026–32): Stéphane Mazars (RE)
- Area^{1}: 11.18 km^{2} (4.32 sq mi)
- Elevation: 627 m (2,057 ft)
- Highest elevation: 643 m (2,110 ft)
- Lowest elevation: 501 m (1,644 ft)
- Population (2023): 23,981
  - Density: 2,145/km^{2} (5,556/sq mi)
- Demonym: Ruthénois
- Time zone: UTC+01:00 (CET)
  - Summer (DST): UTC+02:00 (CEST)
- INSEE/Postal code: 12202 /12000
- Website: www.ville-rodez.fr
- ^{1} French Land Register data, which excludes lakes, ponds, glaciers > 1 km^{2} (0.386 sq mi or 247 acres) and river estuaries.

Rodez (French pronunciation: [ʁɔdɛs], [ʁɔdɛz], locally: [ʁoˈðɛs]; Occitan: Rodés, [rruˈðes]) is a small city and commune in the South of France, about 150 km (93 mi) northeast of Toulouse. It is the prefecture of the Aveyron department in the Occitania region (formerly Midi-Pyrénées). In 2023 its population was 23,981. The capital of the former Rouergue province, Rodez is the seat of the communauté d'agglomération Rodez Agglomération, the Diocese of Rodez and Vabres, the Departmental Council of Aveyron, as well as the main settlement of the 1st constituency of Aveyron.

== Geography ==
=== Location ===
Located in the south of France, in the heart of the triangle formed by Toulouse, Clermont-Ferrand and Montpellier, in the western foothills of the Massif Central, the Rodez landscape is situated between the valleys and high plateaus of Grands Causses and the moist hills of Ségala. It extends into Grand Rodez, with the communes of Onet-le-Château, Sainte-Radegonde, Le Monastère, Olemps and Luc-la-Primaube, which forms an agglomeration of 83,000 habitants adjoining the city of Rodez.

=== Geology and landforms ===
The territory of Rodez is packed with geological diversity. It straddles the ancient base of Ségala composed of acidic siliceous soil of Les Rougiers consisting of red argillite, and causses composed of limestones and marls. The city was built on a conical isolated terrain, locally called Le Piton, and gradually spread to the surrounding slopes. It is located in a seismicity level 2 zone which is a low level.

=== Hydrography ===
The Aveyron crosses the commune and is important for fishing. Green spaces are proposed for the Layoule Quarter, and the Auterne stream.

=== Climate ===
Rodez has an oceanic climate (Cfb), and is colder compared to other cities in the south of France. Winters are sharp and summers often very hot and sunny. During winter, Rodez has occasional snowfall due to its low altitude of 550 metres (1,800 ft) in contrast to other towns in the north of the department closer to the higher Aubrac plateau.

In 2011, with nearly 2,400 hours or 304 days of sunshine per year, Rodez was ranked 2,407th of French cities in terms of sunshine, significantly above the national average.

Comparison of weather conditions
City	Sunshine (hrs/yr)	Rain (mm/yr)	Snow (days/yr)	Storm (days/yr)	Fog (days/yr)
Rodez	2300	770	11	22	22
National Average	1973	770	14	22	40
Paris	1661	637	12	18	10
Nice	2724	733	1	29	1
Strasbourg	1693	665	29	29	53
Brest	1605	1211	7	12	75

On average, Rodez experiences 66.3 days per year with a minimum temperature below 0 °C (32.0 °F), 1.9 days per year with a minimum temperature below −10 °C (14.0 °F), 5 days per year with a maximum temperature below 0 °C (32.0 °F), and 16.4 days per year with a maximum temperature above 30 °C (86.0 °F). The record high temperature was 38.9 °C (102.0 °F) on August 16, 1987 and June 27, 2019, while the record low temperature was −25.2 °C (−13.4 °F) on January 16, 1985.

Climate data for Rodez, France, 1991–2020 normals, extremes 1972–present
Month	Jan	Feb	Mar	Apr	May	Jun	Jul	Aug	Sep	Oct	Nov	Dec	Year
Record high °C (°F)	18.9 (66.0)	23.5 (74.3)	25.0 (77.0)	26.5 (79.7)	33.1 (91.6)	38.9 (102.0)	38.8 (101.8)	38.9 (102.0)	34.4 (93.9)	28.4 (83.1)	25.8 (78.4)	21.0 (69.8)	38.9 (102.0)
Mean daily maximum °C (°F)	7.1 (44.8)	8.3 (46.9)	12.1 (53.8)	14.9 (58.8)	18.9 (66.0)	23.0 (73.4)	25.7 (78.3)	25.8 (78.4)	21.3 (70.3)	16.6 (61.9)	10.9 (51.6)	8.0 (46.4)	16.1 (60.9)
Daily mean °C (°F)	3.4 (38.1)	3.9 (39.0)	7.1 (44.8)	9.7 (49.5)	13.4 (56.1)	17.2 (63.0)	19.5 (67.1)	19.6 (67.3)	15.6 (60.1)	12.1 (53.8)	7.1 (44.8)	4.3 (39.7)	11.1 (51.9)
Mean daily minimum °C (°F)	−0.2 (31.6)	−0.5 (31.1)	2.1 (35.8)	4.5 (40.1)	8.0 (46.4)	11.4 (52.5)	13.4 (56.1)	13.4 (56.1)	9.9 (49.8)	7.5 (45.5)	3.2 (37.8)	0.5 (32.9)	6.1 (43.0)
Record low °C (°F)	−25.2 (−13.4)	−16.1 (3.0)	−14.5 (5.9)	−6.2 (20.8)	−2.7 (27.1)	1.3 (34.3)	3.0 (37.4)	3.0 (37.4)	−2.0 (28.4)	−6.1 (21.0)	−11.5 (11.3)	−13.2 (8.2)	−25.2 (−13.4)
Average precipitation mm (inches)	74.9 (2.95)	54.1 (2.13)	62.6 (2.46)	84.3 (3.32)	96.9 (3.81)	64.2 (2.53)	55.6 (2.19)	59.9 (2.36)	77.5 (3.05)	75.8 (2.98)	85.3 (3.36)	78.0 (3.07)	869.1 (34.21)
Average precipitation days (≥ 1.0 mm)	11.6	9.2	10.0	10.5	10.5	7.8	6.7	7.6	8.2	9.6	11.7	11.4	114.8
Mean monthly sunshine hours	84.7	124.9	171.5	192.7	218.9	255.8	282.2	273.8	218.2	164.7	103.8	102.0	2,193.2
Source: Meteociel

Events based on the data of Météo-France at Millau Soulobres station, from 1965:

Lowest temperature	−17.5 °C (0.5 °F)
Coldest day	16 January 1985
Coldest year	1980
Highest temperature	37.5 °C (99.5 °F)
Hottest day	30 July 1983 and 16 August 1987
Warmest year	1997
Maximum rainfall in 24 hours	115 millimetres (4.5 in)
Maximum snowfall in 24 hours	1.5 metres (4 ft 11 in)
Rainiest day	26 September 1992
Driest year	1967
Wettest year	1969

On 28 January 2006, Rodez experienced an important snow episode. A metre of powdery snow accumulated, crippling the Let Piton economy for several days.

=== Transportation ===
Rodez is a growing city and an important economic engine in the Midi-Pyrénées since the early 2000s. Its location on RN 88, the Toulouse-Lyon axis, is essential to its economic and tourist development and plays a vital role for Rodez, as it is a connection to regional cities such as Toulouse, Albi and Castres, with which it is developing collaborations.

As of 2005, the Aveyron department continues to improve its regional connectivity. The Rodez ring road, which surrounds the agglomeration of Grand Rodez is gradually being converted to a dual carriageway urban boulevard and improving Rodez as a strategic location. Future plans (2018) call for the entire ring road to be a dual carriageway as part of the 2014-2018 plan. Three grade separated roundabouts are planned as part of the dualing urban boulevard project: Moutiers, La Gineste and Saint-Marc. A major bypass is also proposed but without a specific deadline.

In 2009, the Rodez-Aveyron Airport expanded its terminal and introduction of new international scheduled destinations.

Local transportation options include car rentals and the local bus system (Agglobus). The city centre (centre ville), with its cobblestone streets lined with ancient buildings hundreds of years old, is pedestrian friendly.

==== Routes ====
===== Railway lines =====
Rodez station is at the crossing point of rail lines from Capdenac (to Paris), Albi along the Castelnaudary to Rodez line (destined for Toulouse) and Sévérac-le-Château (destined for Millau). The rail network has undergone numerous restructurings, including the plan rail Midi-Pyrénées. Between 2009 and 2013, replacement of rails, the rehabilitation of structures, replacement of information systems traffic operations on the Rodez-Toulouse and Rodez-Paris lines have resulted in network improvement. Additionally, the region was equipped with new TER trains in 2013 that are faster and more comfortable.

===== Main roads =====
Rodez is situated along RN88 (route linking Toulouse to Lyon), transformed in the Rodez area into an urban boulevard [dual carriageways, many on and off sliproads, speed limited to between 70–110 km/h (43–68 mph)] to allow the flow of traffic totalling 35,000 vehicles per day. Counting loops are buried to assess traffic for transcription by real-time traffic maps. The portion of this highway, declared a national priority in 1993 between Rodez and Albi, is currently in the process of restructuring with the doubling of the carriageways, after decades of studies and that since 18 October 2010, date of the official launch of this vast site.

A portion of the RN88 road between Rodez and Carmaux should be completely converted into a dual carriageway expressway and put into service in 2018, thus allowing a virtually seamless dual carriageway journey between Rodez and Toulouse (with the exception of the portion between Albi and Carmaux the route upgrading to motorway is envisaged but not programmed to date). Indeed, the A68 has been in service between Albi and Toulouse for several years. As of 2018, the RN88 which is an extension of the A68 will then almost all be dual carriageway, thus reducing the time between Rodez and Toulouse. Note that this axis is one of the largest in the Midi-Pyrénées in terms of traffic. As for the portion of the RN88 between Rodez and Sévérac-le-Château, this last link is missing dual carriageway, studies are underway but work will not begin before 2020 due to lack of credits granted. At the end of this work, the entire journey will be converted into dual carriageway between Rodez and the principal cities around the Mediterranean.

Furthermore, the segment of the city between Espalion and Rodez underwent a restructuring with the diversion of Curlande commissioned in 2011. A bypass project of the town of Espalion is ongoing since the beginning of this year towards the west of the Lot Valley and Aurillac. With the RN88 which is the most important artery of the agglomeration, Rodez is the focal point of several routes from its own department or bordering departments:

- The Route Nationale 88 which provides access to Albi, Castres, Montpellier, Toulouse to the south and Clermont-Ferrand, Lyon, Orléans, Paris and also Millau, Sète, Béziers, Narbonne and Perpignan to the north. Rodez is located 50 kilometres (31 mi) from the A75
- The Route departmental 840 reaches the International Airport of Rodez-Aveyron, Decazeville (then Aurillac by the RD963 and the RN122), Figeac, Brive then the A20 to Limoges, Tours, Orléans and Paris
- The Route departmental 994 joins to Villefranche-de-Rouergue, Cahors, Villeneuve-sur-Lot, then the autoroute to Bordeaux.

Place	Distance	Average travelling time (Note: Google maps consulted 15 February 2013)
Toulouse	150 kilometres (93 mi)	1 hrs 50 mins (as of 2013) (1 hrs 15 mins in January 2016, by dual carriageway)
Montpellier	173 kilometres (107 mi)	2 hrs 00 mins
Perpignan	273 kilometres (170 mi)	2 hrs 50 mins
Clermont-Ferrand	244 kilometres (152 mi)	2 hrs 40 mins
Bordeaux	345 kilometres (214 mi)	3 hrs 45 mins
Marseille	342 kilometres (213 mi)	4 hrs 00 mins
Lyon	330 kilometres (210 mi)	4 hrs 15 mins
Nice	497 kilometres (309 mi)	5 hrs 00 mins
Paris	661 kilometres (411 mi)	6 hrs 00 mins

==== Transport network ====
===== Rail =====
The railway station of Rodez, located on Avenue du Maréchal Joffre, is the main station of Aveyron. There are daily trains to Paris and Toulouse, as well as other trains and buses connecting Rodez to smaller towns. It serves Paris-Austerlitz (Intercités), Toulouse-Matabiau (TER), Brive-la-Gaillarde (TER), Millau (TER and regional bus), Montpellier (bus with mandatory charging at Millau station) and other stations of the department and bordering departments. In addition, it is noted that many other large French cities can be reached by the connections in Toulouse and Brive. The lines and railway infrastructure have undergone important renovations with the complete change of the rails, the modernisation of technical systems and structures as well as the implementation of new systems of traffic management. In the next few years, the aim is for a time of 1 hour 45 minutes from Rodez to Toulouse and 4 hours 50 minutes from Rodez to Paris through the LGV Poitiers-Limoges.

In the past, the Rodez and Aveyron rail network was part of the company of the Chemins de fer du Midi. Formerly, there was a second station, that of "Paraire" below the current Lycée Foch, close to the city centre but closed in the 1970s. Today, there is no service there.

===== Road =====
Rodez is the central point of numerous bus routes coming from the department or bordering departments. Indeed, there are currently nearly 60 routes.

===== Air =====
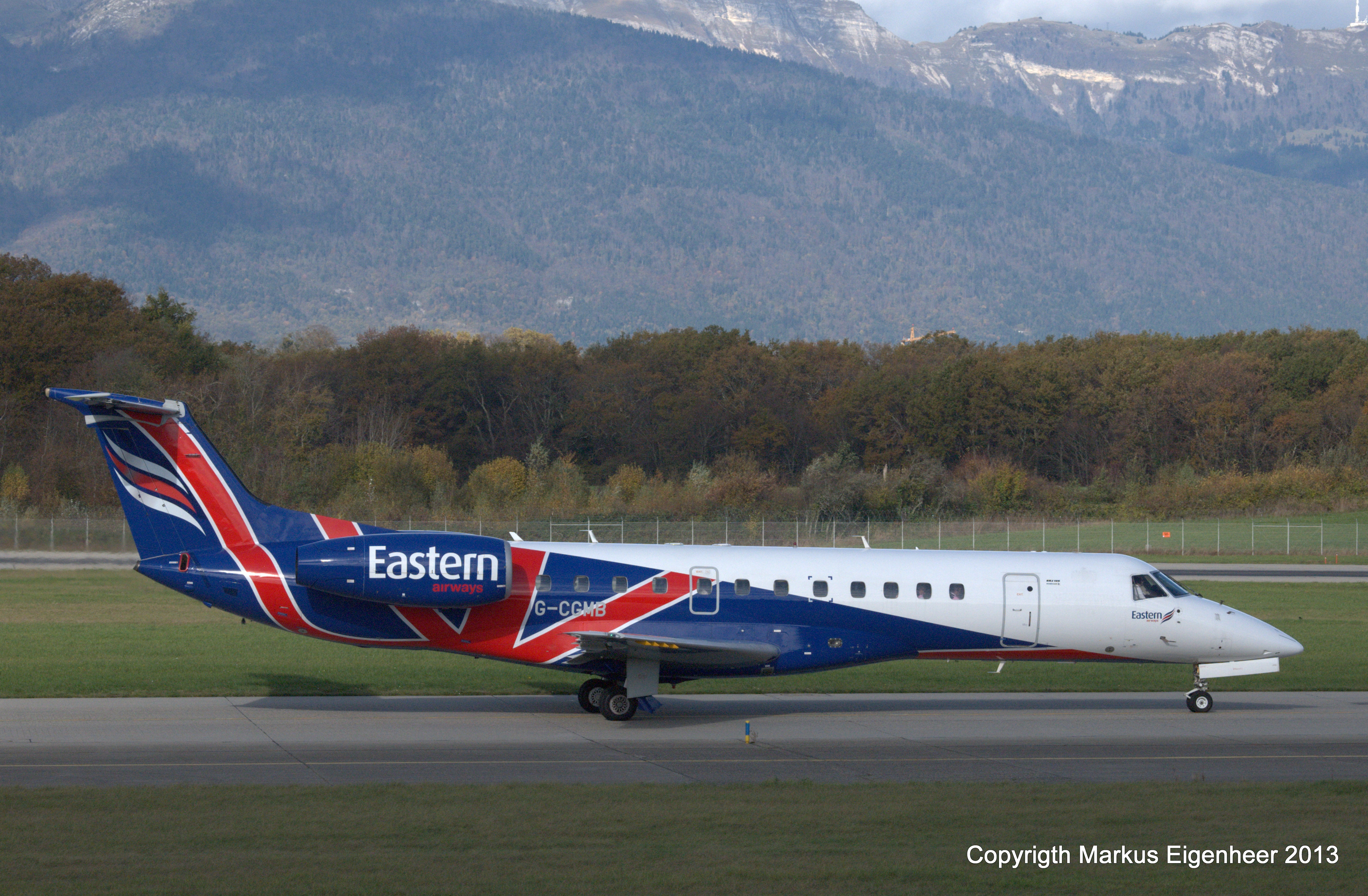
Rodez-Aveyron has a daily connection to Paris-Orly in 1 hour 25 minutes.

Rodez is served by the nearby Rodez Marcillac Airport, located within the commune of Salles-la-Source. The international airport of Rodez-Aveyron is the third airport of the Occitanie region after Toulouse and Tarbes, and the main platform of the south of the Massif Central, with direct scheduled flights to:

- Paris-Orly
- Southampton Airport
- Dublin
- Bruxelles-Charleroi

===== Public transport =====
The city has had a longstanding public transport system, the tramway of Rodez having circulated from 1902 to 1920. Nowadays, these journeys are made by buses. Agglobus is the transit network serving the communes of the Communauté d'agglomération du Grand Rodez, nearly 60,000 people, where a multiple purchase ticket shall not exceed €0.20. It allows service to the centre of Rodez from outside communes (and vice versa) before 8am with a time range for operation of the service between 7am (5am for some lines) and 8pm. These lines have scheduled timing. This network is complemented by an evening service that operates Monday to Saturday, from 8pm to 11:30pm, by a transport service scheduled running Monday to Saturday with two round trips per day, and for persons with reduced mobility which works at the same times as the bus network. The Rodez topography makes it difficult to create special lanes for buses. As such, the Agglobus network is equipped with a system of prioritisation at traffic lights and also a geolocation for buses.

===== Postal transport =====
Rodez has had an operational sorting centre since July 2009. It receives about 400,000 letters every day and processes 14 per second. All of the letters posted from Rodez to a destination within the agglomeration and its own region are delivered the next morning. Courier services, international and domestic carriers are also present in Rodez. The city has three post offices with its central office located in the city centre, at Place Foch, near the cathedral. Other branches are located in the suburbs as well as in the Bourran Quarter. In addition, other communes forming the urban agglomeration of the Grand Rodez also have their post offices, including the Aveyron sorting centre located in the commune of Onet-le-Château.

== Urban planning ==
=== Urban morphology ===
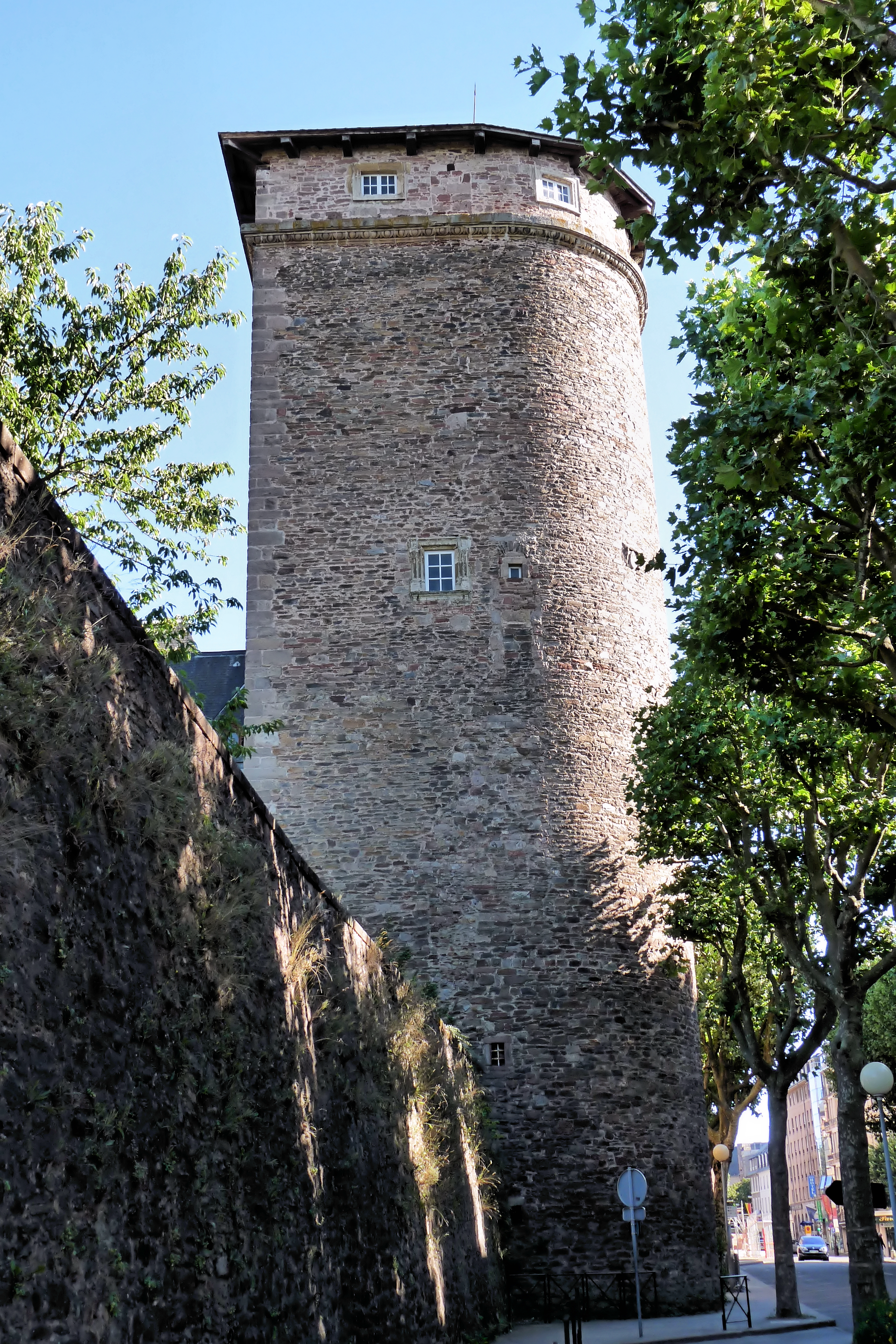
Tour des Corbières, 15th century, with a section of the ramparts at the Boulevard d'Estourmel.

Rodez is an ancient city, the road becomes gradually narrower as it approaches Vieux-Rodez [Old Rodez] and the remains of the ancient city fortress are still strongly present in the form of ramparts. Its hyper-centre is extended over many streets and pedestrian alleys between the squares of Place du Bourg, Place de l'Olmet, Place de la Cité and the Place de la Madeleine, one discovers typical houses in a mostly preserved historical setting. In these squares markets or fairs are held while the Passage du Mazel hosts a daily trade of fresh and seasonal produce. Pedestrian streets, very concentrated in the old centre, today are a place of life with many commercial signs. Beyond, Avenue Victor-Hugo is a long straight avenue lined with trees, leading to a central hub, the Place d'Armes, to access the boulevards on the periphery of the city centre. Road traffic is carried around the walls located on the boulevards of Estourmel, Belle Isle, Denys Puech and Flaugergues encircling the centre and served by streets parallel to this historic heart.

Beyond Vieux-Rodez, the city expanded during the 20th century. To meet the demands of the era, new neighbourhoods and economic zones were developed. Rodez was, during the post-war period, an average city that had the most buildings beyond its circular boulevards. Finally, the creation of the Bourran Viaduct allowed the extension of the city beyond the Auterne Valley. (Note: Magazine "Rodez Notre Ville" - June 2011)

The town of Rodez is part of the Grands Sites de Midi-Pyrénées. It continues to work to obtain the label Ville d'Art et d'Histoire and wishes to file its candidacy for UNESCO world heritage. Thus, the historic centre, and joined developments, are designed to meet the criteria of these institutions.

The municipality is divided into five major quarters:

West Quarter	North Quarter	Central Quarter	South Quarter	East Quarter
Bourran	Saint-Félix	Vieux-Rodez	Paraire	Cardaillac
Versailles	Saint-Éloi	Centre-Ville	Gourgan	Ambec
La Fontanile	Les Moutiers		La Mouline	Layoule
La Gineste	L'Oustal Nau		Pont Viel	Fayet
Camonil	Paul Ramadier, etc.		La Gascarie, etc.	Le Cimetière, etc.
Pré Lamarque, etc.				

=== Housing ===
Rodez has many rental housing units. In addition, the average of new housing has four rooms. Its housing stock remains fairly young, 59% of dwellings are from subsequent to World War II. Despite this, planning is progressing day by day and the homes and other premises have increased by 23% each year. As regards social housing, and particularly the SRU Act which introduced a minimum quota of 20% social housing for cities, Rodez had 10% in 2007 and stagnated at around 12% in 2011.

=== Arrangements of the "Forail-Cathedral" axis ===
==== Quadrilatère Combarel ====
The now demolished old Combarel hospital will be replaced by housing and green spaces. Since the 19th century, the Combarel hospital enjoyed a privileged location in the heart of the city and at the centre of the agglomeration. The purchase of the former hospital by the agglomeration of Grand Rodez aims to impose the site as a centre of activity of the city, as it once was. A conversion will redraw all of the area and allow it to become a real neighbourhood to live, in order to revitalise the heart of the metropolitan area of Grand Rodez. The district wants a place with trees and green space, in which can be found housing as well tertiary activities, shops. The whole of the 30,000 square metres (320,000 sq ft) area will be mid-residential and mid-institutional, probably with the construction of a new hotel. This area will be part of a construction complying with environmental standards. The project is based on maintaining, on the upper plateau, the entire quadrilatère and chapel, as well as the development of the former Capuchin convent.

==== Forail public garden ====
The Foirail public garden, and the Esplanade du Foirail, is located in the heart of the city. Consisting of a large courtyard with various mood lighting, it can accommodate some entertainments and events (concerts, outdoor performances etc.). This place has coherence with the various cultural and economic facilities which are adjacent (Musée Soulages, festival hall, cinema multiplex and the centre of L'Amphithéâtre). Finally, the public garden located nearby, having gained 20% more land after the redevelopment of the area, offers different walks around the different peripheral facilities.

==== Multiplex cinema ====
The multiplex consists of 10 cinema rooms with between 68 and 404 seats, spread over two levels with a total of 1580 seats opened in November 2013. Double access (next to the Giratoire de l'Europe and Avenue Victor-Hugo). A fast food area as well as a night beerhouse are integrated within the confines of the cinema centre having also two other shops.

==== Underground parking ====
To allow the population to take advantage of the cultural and economic facilities and hold a means of parking for people working in the centre of Rodez, entirely underground parking totalling 400 spaces was built at a depth of 10 metres (33 ft), and on two levels, under the Esplanade des Ruthènes. It opened at the same time as the multiplex.

==== Exhibition park ====
This project, scheduled for the commune of Olemps will open its doors in the second half of 2016, after work which will begin in 2015. This will be designed to host cultural performances, economic events or conferences, with a set of 3,000 seats.

== Toponymy ==
In antiquity, during the Roman occupation, the city was named Segodunum. The roots being sego "strong" (Note: Segovia or Segobriga, the capital of Celtiberians, shares the same etymology.) and dunum "hill", where Segodunum "high hill, stronghold" is at the origin of the Gaulish name of Rodez.

During the middle to the end of the Roman Empire, the city was called Civitas Rutenorum, the city of the Ruteni. Then, it became Ruteni and finally Rodez.

Rodez is locally pronounced ""Rodess" [ʀodɛs] in French. That is explained by the spelling of the city in Occitan: Rodés, pronounced "Rroodess" [rruˈðes]. Rodez was spelled with a final z, instead of s, to maintain the closed e of Occitan and to prevent it from becoming silent.

== History ==
Existing from at least the 5th century BC, Rodez was founded by the Celts. After the Roman occupation, the oppidum (fortified place) was renamed Segodunum, while in late Imperial times it was known as Civitas Rutenorum, whence the modern name. After the fall of the Western Roman Empire, it was captured by the Visigoths and then by the Franks, being also ravaged by the Arabs in 725. Later it was occupied by the armies of the Dukes of Aquitaine and of the Counts of Toulouse. English troops occupied Rodez during the Hundred Years War.

However, in medieval times the city's history was marked by strong rivalry between the Counts and the Bishops of Rodez, who exerted their authorities in different sectors of the city, divided by a wall. The counts were able to defy the royal French authority until the submission of count John IV by the future King Louis XI in the 15th century. In the following century bishop François d'Estaing built the Rodez Cathedral.

The last count of Rodez, Henry VI of Rodez, who became Henry IV of France, sold his title to the Royal Crown in 1589. The city remained a flourishing merchant centre up to the 18th century, when the nearby town Villefranche-de-Rouergue was made the seat of the experimental Provincial Estates of the Haute-Guyenne. However, with the French Revolution Rodez became the chef-lieu of the newly created department of the Aveyron and has remained so since.

=== Antiquity ===
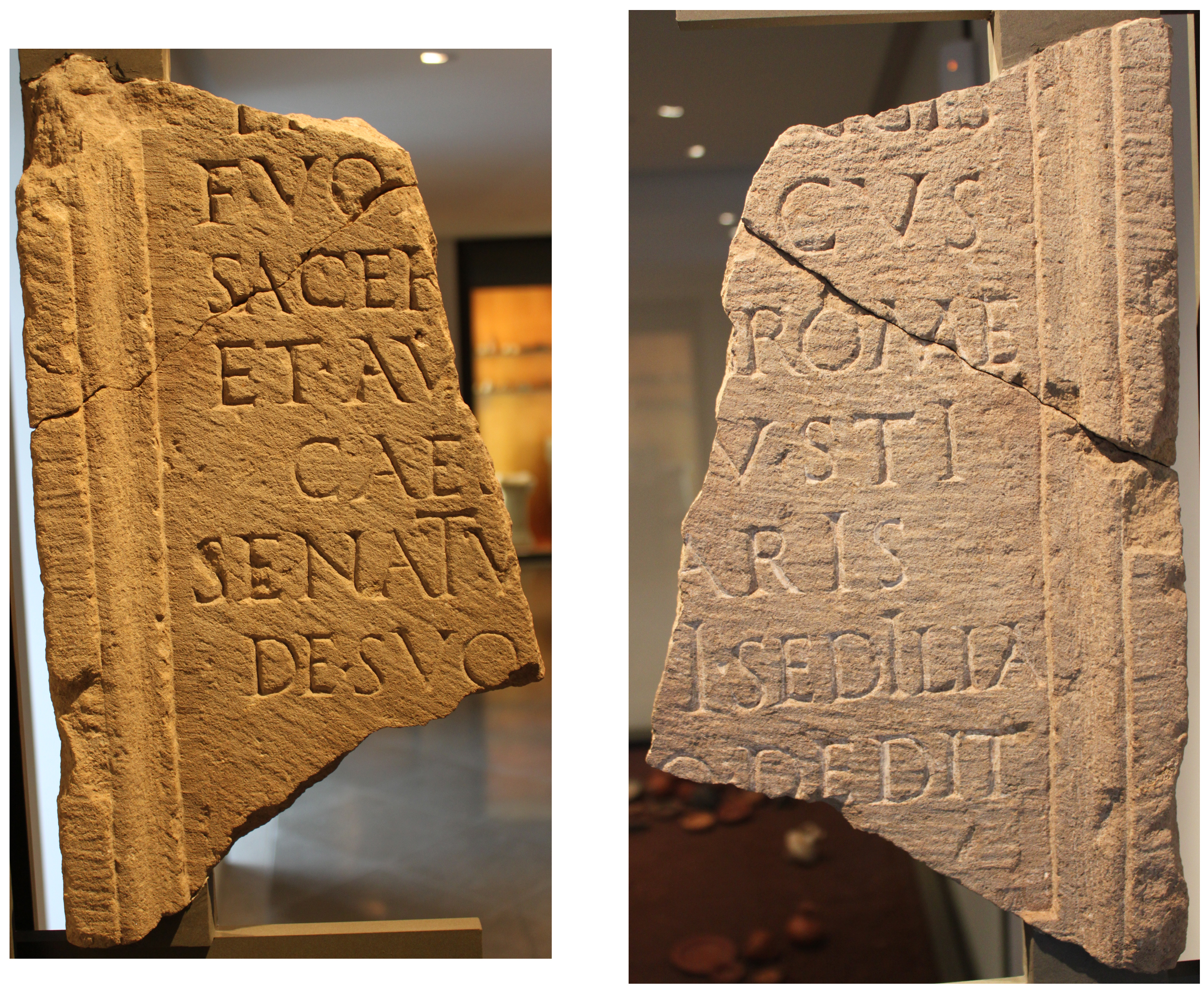
Latin inscription found in Rodez (Augustan era)

Rodez is a city of more than two millennia: its existence dates back to the 5th century BC, when a Celtic tribe of Central Europe, the Ruteni, stopped in the south of Auvergne to found one of these characteristic oppida of the Gallic civilization, that of Segodunum. Many elements of heritage bear witness to the Romanisation of Segodunum.

While Christianity spread in the wake of the evangelising activity of Saint Amans, the city witnessed, and at times suffered during, the less stable times that followed the fall of the Roman Empire.

=== Middle Ages ===
Rodez was successively occupied by the Visigoths, the Franks, the armies of the Dukes of Aquitaine and the Counts of Toulouse, as well as by the Moors, who seized Rodez in 725, and damaged the ancient church. Years later, it was the English who captured Rodez, during the Hundred Years' War.

The history of the city remained marked for a long time by an intense rivalry between the Counts of Rodez, who dominated the town extra-muros, and the Bishops of Rodez, who dominated intra-muros. A wall separated the two sectors. Each community had a town hall, its consuls, and its own administration; each competing for power. To the town, the famous dynasty of the Counts of Armagnac and Rodez, eventually acquired sovereign privileges: Coining money at the Martelenque Tower, wearing the crown and persisting to recognise the antipope Benedict XIII and his heirs Bernard Garnier and Jean Carrier, for a time. This led inevitably to confrontation with the King of France in 1443. The dauphin, the future Louis XI, came to occupy Rodez and submit Count Jean IV. Later his son would have a seditious idea, trying to betray Louis XI. This caused him to be killed in Lectoure, with his family, during his escape.

=== Early Modern era ===
At the beginning of the 16th century, Rodez was marked by Bishop François d'Estaing (from one of the most famous families of Rouergue). He finished the work of construction of the Cathedral of Our Lady of Rodez. He added the architectural masterpiece that is the bell tower, at 87 metres (285 ft), topped by a Virgin, yet today the highest bell tower, without a spire, in France. The works were completed in the fifteen years between 1510 and 1526 and this despite the plague ravaging the city.

The rivalry between the two powers somewhat served the development of Rodez. Despite the testimonies that are its many made Gothic masterpieces from the 13th to the 16th century, the city has not really experienced long periods of prosperity. In 1589, Henri IV, Count of Rodez, attached the destiny of the County of Rodez to the Crown. The story of Rodez then copied that of France. Throughout the 17th and 18th centuries, Rodez became a thriving market city.

Rodez was divided into 6 parishes:

- Notre-Dame (cathedral, suburb)
- Saint-Amans, including the hamlet of Pont-Viel, a large part of the territory of the current commune of Olemps (Olemps, La Mouline, Toizac, Linars, Benechou) and a part of the municipality of La Monastère (Foulhoubous)
- Sainte-Catherine
- La Madeleine (church demolished)
- Saint-Martin-des-Prés (Layoule area)
- Saint-Félix: The area of Saint-Felix, Calcomier, La Peyrinie, and the entire valley of the Fontanges stream located in the current municipality of Onet-le-Château (Canaguet, Fontanges, Floyrac, Labro, Vabre, Puech Baurez Flars)

=== Modern era ===
The old rival of Rodez was Villefranche-de-Rouergue. The French Revolution took away Villefranche's role of administrative capital, for the benefit of Rodez, which became prefecture and chef-lieu district of the new department of Aveyron due to its central position. The religious heritage of the city was only partially degraded.

In June 1792, the scientists of the time cared about to know the exact measurement of the metre. Rodez would be a "central" element to accomplish this measure. Indeed, Jean Baptiste Joseph Delambre was responsible for measuring the distance from Dunkirk to Rodez, while Pierre Méchain was the one measuring between Barcelona and Rodez. They were to meet in Rodez to combine their results and determine the value of the metre. In 1793, at Montjouy in Barcelona, Méchain detected an inconsistency between the recorded lengths and an astronomical survey of the position of the stars. The Franco-Spanish war prevented him from repeating measurements. This difference (which was in fact not due to a handling error but the uncertainty of the instruments used) plunged him into deep trouble and he made every effort to avoid having to report on his work in Paris. In 1799, he resigned himself to attend an international conference which welcomed his scientific work. In 1798, the Société centrale d'agriculture de l'Aveyron was created.

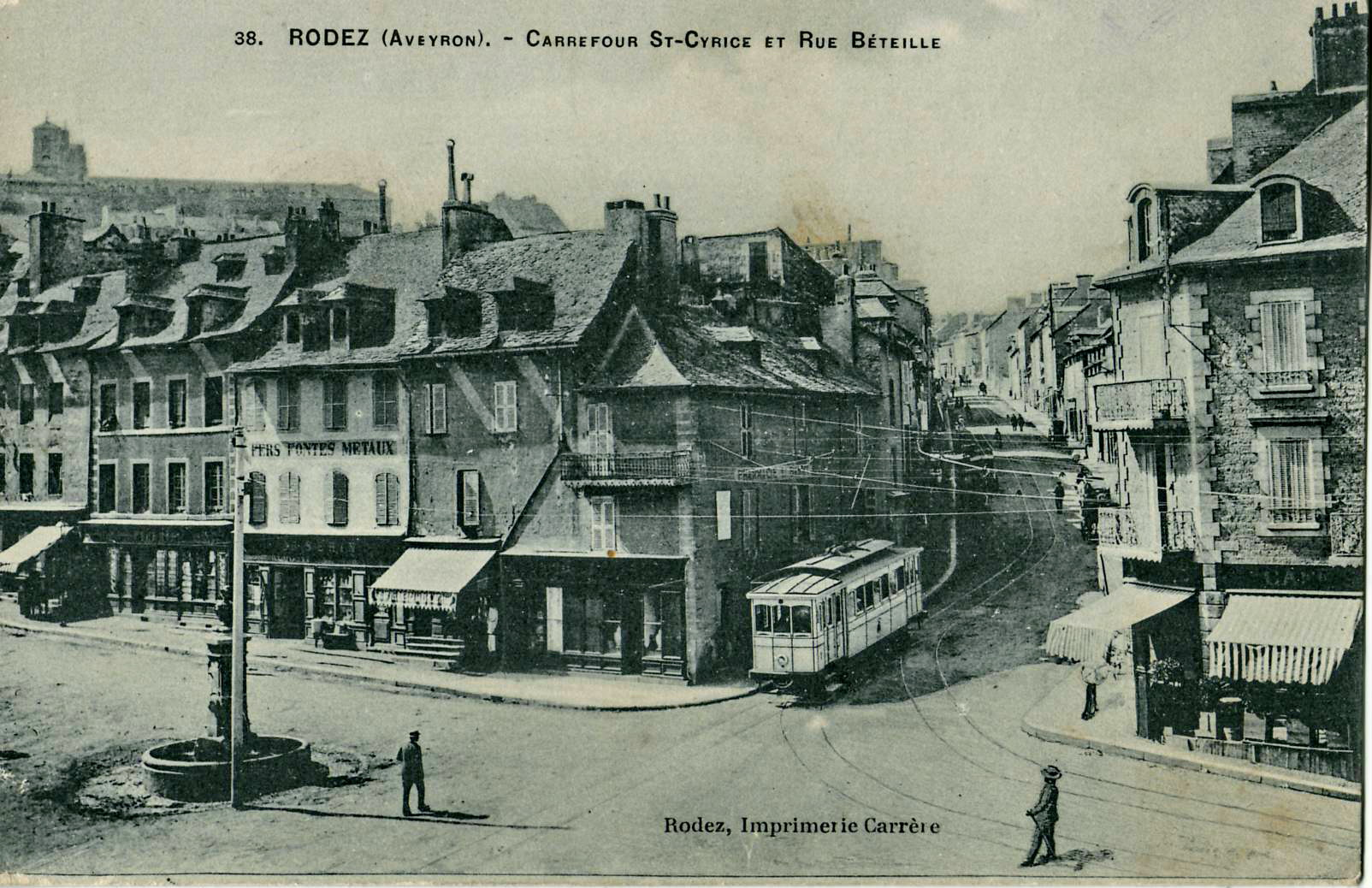
The city centre in the early 20th century. It was connected to the station with the tramway of Rodez, which is seen here with a tram.

Under the Bourbon Restoration, the Affaire Fualdès (regarding the murder of Antoine Bernardin Fualdès) included a highly controversial trial and executions. Rodez received many journalists, on this occasion, who described the behaviour of Rodez people from a very subjective standpoint.

The 19th century also experienced a cultural revival. In 1836, the Society of Letters, Sciences and Arts of Aveyron was founded on the initiative of Hippolyte de Barrau. The main leaders of the department were involved in the cultural life of the province. Modernisation of Rodez occurred very slowly during the 19th century. Little by little, Rodez evolved by affirming and developing its role as capital of the department of Aveyron from the 21st century, creating its own economy and independence, whilst remaining linked to Toulouse. Thus, from this period, many facilities have appeared such as the Jacques Puel Hospital, the development of the Rodez-Marcillac Airport platform, high-speed connections to Rodez, the Esplanade du Foirail with its multiplex cinemas, the Pierre Soulages Museum and its festival hall.

== Politics and administration ==
=== List of mayors ===
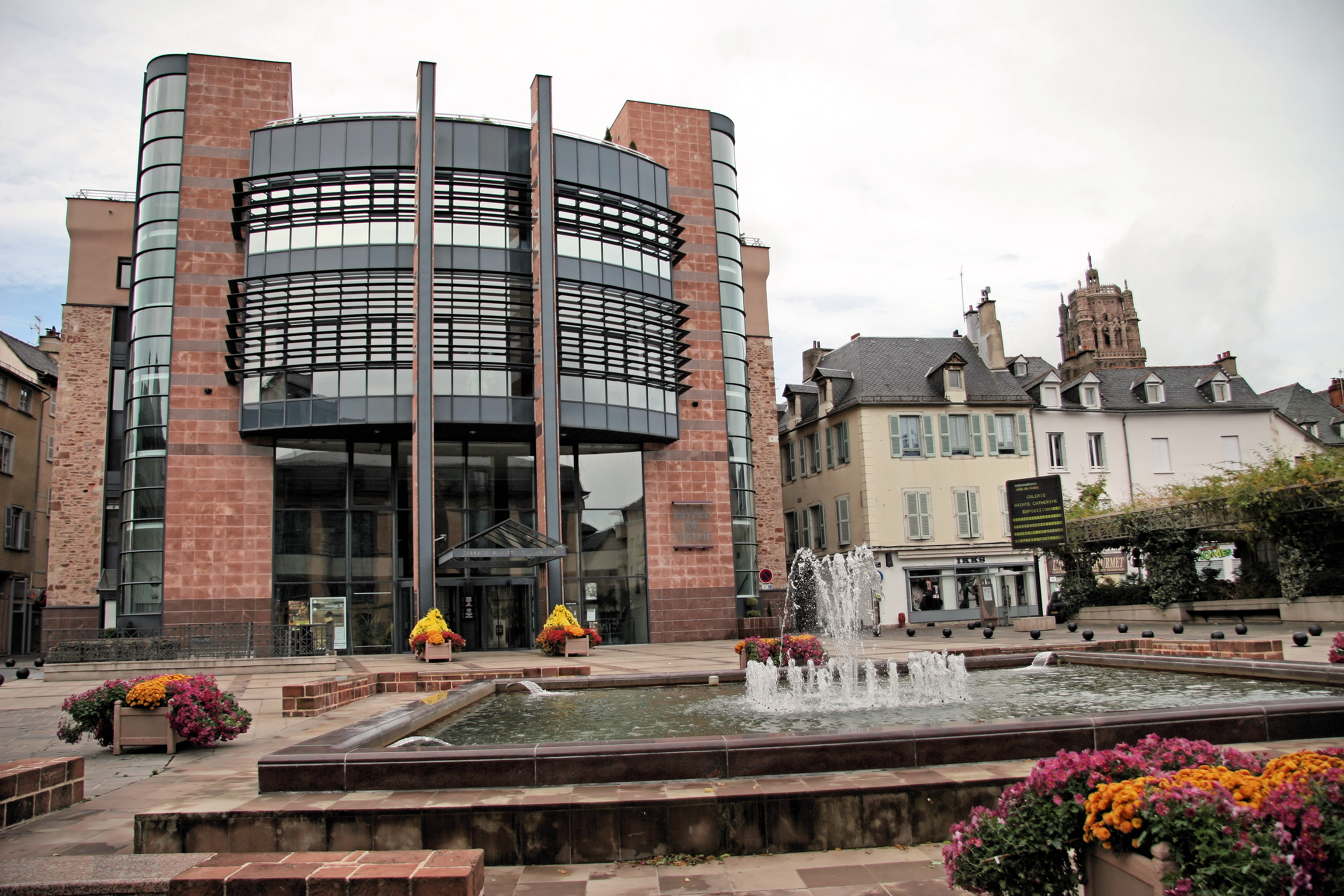
The Hôtel de Ville

List of mayors of Rodez
Start	End	Name	Party	Other details
1983	2008	Marc Censi	UDF then UMP	* Engineer: President of the Midi-Pyrénées Region from 1988 to 1998; Former President of the Communauté d'agglomération du Grand Rodez; Former President of the Assemblée des communautés de France
2008	2026	Christian Teyssèdre	PS	* Regional Councillor of Midi-Pyrénées: President of Grand Rodez
2026	Incumbent	Stéphane Mazars	Renaissance	

The Hôtel de Ville was remodelled in 1994.

=== Intercommunality ===
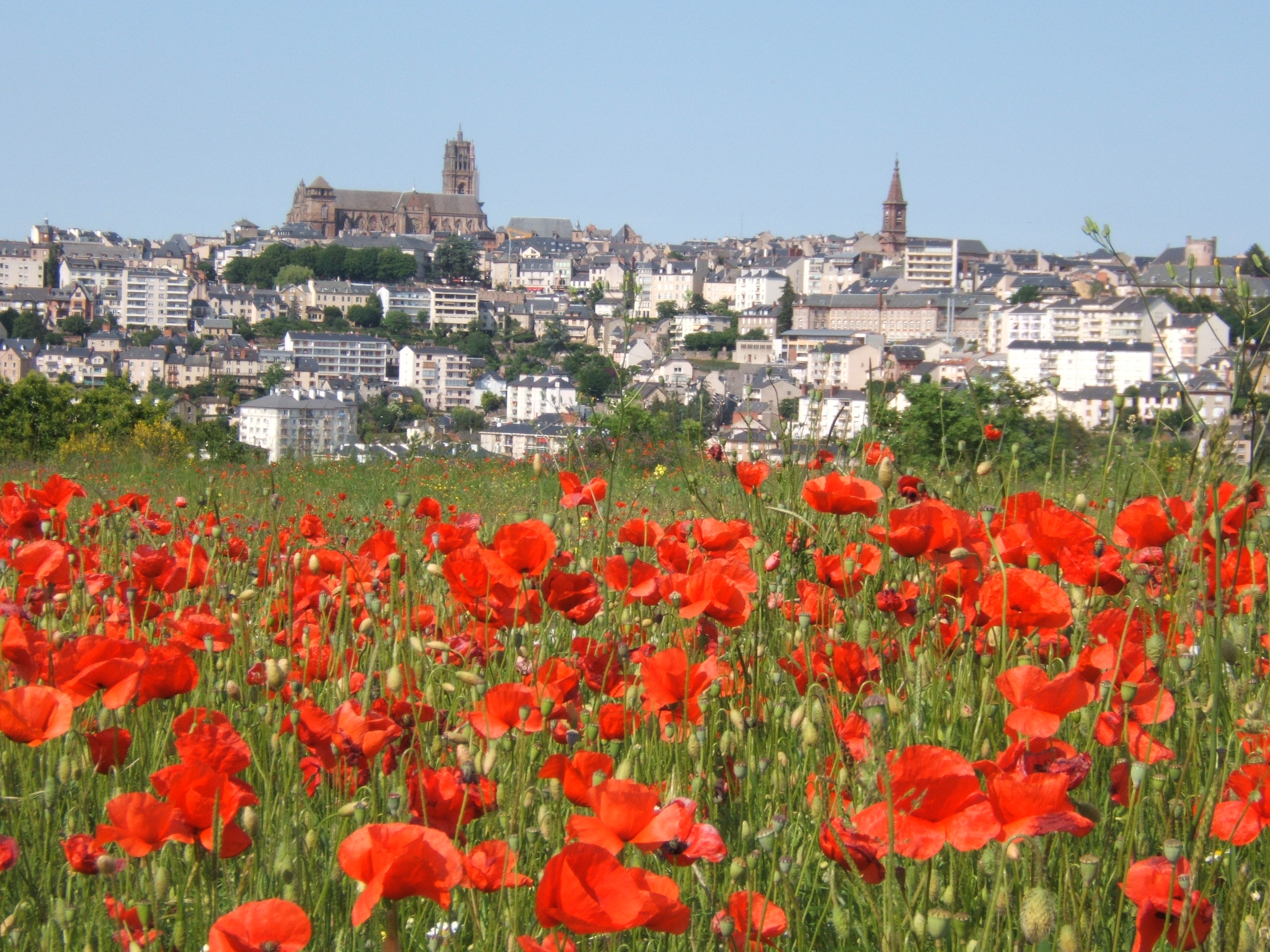
An artistic view of Rodez and the agglomeration

Rodez is the seat of the Communauté d'agglomération du Grand Rodez, whose headquarters is at 1 Place Adrien Rozier. Established in 1964 and incorporated in the district, it then became an agglomeration community on 20 December 1999. Today, it has eight communes.

The commune, an important part of the southern Massif Central, is also close to other cities located in the southwest such as Toulouse and Albi, as well as in the centre and north of the Massif Central such as Aurillac and Mende with which it forms the Estelle city network. Finally, one can note the existence of the Espace urbain Rodez-Decazeville.

=== Judicial and administrative authorities ===
The town of Rodez is the seat of the General Council of Aveyron and the Council of the community of the Grand Rodez. The conurbation has a fire service barracks, a municipal police force, an SAMU and an SMUR (both medical emergency services), a poison control centre and a remand prison while the State administers the prefecture of the department, and a gendarmerie brigade. A new remand prison will be located in the commune of Druelle in July 2013 with a capacity of about 100 male inmates, including a capacity of ten for people eligible for day parole. Finally, the administrations of the State are present in Rodez (tax office, Bank of France, social security, family allowance, etc.).

For the courts, it has an instance tribunal and a high court with an assizes court, a tribunal of commerce, an industrial tribunal and a juvenile court. The court of appeal is located in Montpellier.

=== Cantons of Rodez ===
Since 2015, Rodez is the chef-lieu of three cantons:

- Rodez-1 comprises the western part of Rodez.
- Rodez-2 comprises the commune of Le Monastère and the central and eastern part of Rodez.
- Rodez-Onet comprises the commune of Onet-le-Château and the northern part of Rodez.

Canton	Cantonal code	Population (2017)
Rodez-1	1216	11,876 inhabitants
Rodez-2	1217	12,384 inhabitants
Rodez-Onet	1218	13,961 inhabitants

=== International relations ===
Rodez is twinned with:

- Bamberg, Germany, since 1970

=== Honorary citizens ===
Íngrid Betancourt has been an honorary citizen of the city of Rodez since 28 March 2008.

=== Municipal administration ===
The city council has 35 seats, of which 26 are occupied by the majority and nine seats by the opposition. The leader is the mayor, Stéphane Mazars.

=== Political trends and results ===
==== Municipal elections of 23 and 30 March 2014 ====
- Outgoing mayor: Christian Teyssèdre (Socialist Party)
- 35 seats in the municipal council (2011 legal population: 23,794 inhabitants)
- 21 seats in the community council (CA of the Grand Rodez)

Results of the municipal elections of 23 and 30 March 2014 in Rodez
Main candidate	List	First round		Second round		Seats	
Main candidate	List	Votes	%	Votes	%	CM	CC
Christian Teyssèdre	PS-PCF-EELV	3,857	42.48	4,433	48.50	26	16
Yves Censi	UMP	2,666	29.36	3,220	35.22	6	4
Bruno Berardi	DVG	1,200	13.21	1,487	16.26	3	1
Matthieu Danen	DVD	816	8.98				
Guilhem Serieys	FG	540	5.94				
Registered		14,821	100.00	14,821	100.00		
Abstentions		5,343	36.05	5,269	35.55		
Voters		9,478	63,95	9,552	64,45		
Blank and spoiled		399	4.21	412	4.31		
Expressed		9,079	95.79	9,140	95.69		

==== Municipal elections of 2008 ====
- Outgoing mayor: Marc Censi (UMP)

Results of the municipal election in Rodez in March 2008
Candidate	Political party	1st round percentage (%)	Seats
Christian Teyssèdre	PS	52.49	28
Jean-Louis Chauzy	MoDem	19.27	3
Régine Taussat	UMP	15.49	2
Frédéric Soulié	DVD	12.75	2

==== Legislative and presidential elections ====
===== 2012 legislative elections =====
- Outgoing Député: Yves Censi (UMP)

Results of the legislative elections of 10 and 17 June 2012 of Aveyron's 1st constituency
Candidate	Party	First round		Second round	
Candidate	Party	Votes	%	Votes	%
Yves Censi*	UMP	19,486	39.83	24,311	50.67
Monique Bultel-Herment	PS	13,829	28.27	23,666	49.33
Stéphane Mazars	PRG	6,938	14.18		
Jean-Guillaume Remise	FN	3,990	8.16		
Guilhem Serieys	FG (PG)	2,708	5.54		
Bruno Bérardi	EELV	1,478	3.02		
Marie-Line Faixa	AEI	337	0.69		
Arlette Saint-Avit	LO	158	0.32		
Registered		75,457	100.00	75,453	100.00
Abstentions		25,660	34.01	25,831	34.23
Voters		49,797	65.99	49,622	65.77
Blank and spoiled		873	1.75	1,645	3.32
Expressed		48,924	98.25	47,977	96.68
* Outgoing député

===== 2012 French Presidential election =====
- Outgoing President: Nicolas Sarkozy

First round (ballot of 22 April 2012) of the French presidential election of 22 April and 6 May 2012
Candidate	Political movement	Score in Rodez	National score	Notes
François Hollande	Socialist Party	32.32%	28.63%	Qualified for the second round
Nicolas Sarkozy	Union for a Popular Movement	26.71%	27.18%	Qualified for the second round
François Bayrou	Democratic Movement	12.50%	9.13%	
Jean-Luc Mélenchon	Left Front	11.55%	11.10%	
Marine Le Pen	National Front	10.86%	17.90%	
Eva Joly	Europe Ecology – The Greens	2.93%	2.31%	
Nicolas Dupont-Aignan	France Arise	1.59%	1.79%	
Philippe Poutou	New Anticapitalist Party	0.95%	1.15%	
Nathalie Arthaud	Lutte Ouvrière	0.39%	0.56%	
Jacques Cheminade	Solidarité et progrès	0.20%	0.25%	

Second round (ballot of 6 May 2012) of the French presidential election of 22 April and 6 May 2012
Candidate	Political movement	Score in Rodez	National Score	Notes
François Hollande	Socialist Party	56.03%	51.63%	Elected President of France
Nicolas Sarkozy	Union for a Popular Movement	43.97%	48.37%	Beaten

== Population and society ==
Its inhabitants are called Ruthénois in French, from the name of the Ruteni, a Gallic tribe which once occupied the territory, the former demonym of "Rodanois" (from Occitan rodanés) having given way to this scholarly form.

=== Demography ===
==== Demographic evolution ====
Historical population

Year	Pop.	±% p.a.
1793	5,592	—
1800	6,233	+1.56%
1806	6,613	+0.99%
1821	7,352	+0.71%
1831	8,240	+1.15%
1836	9,685	+3.28%
1841	9,272	−0.87%
1846	10,936	+3.36%
1851	10,280	−1.23%
1856	10,877	+1.14%
1861	11,856	+1.74%
1866	12,037	+0.30%
1872	12,111	+0.10%

Year	Pop.	±% p.a.
1876	13,375	+2.51%
1881	15,333	+2.77%
1886	15,375	+0.05%
1891	16,122	+0.95%
1896	16,303	+0.22%
1901	16,105	−0.24%
1906	15,502	−0.76%
1911	15,386	−0.15%
1921	14,201	−0.80%
1926	15,150	+1.30%
1931	16,195	+1.34%
1936	18,450	+2.64%
1946	20,437	+1.03%

Year	Pop.	±% p.a.
1954	20,383	−0.03%
1962	20,924	+0.33%
1968	23,328	+1.83%
1975	25,550	+1.31%
1982	24,368	−0.67%
1990	24,701	+0.17%
1999	23,707	−0.46%
2007	24,289	+0.30%
2012	23,744	−0.45%
2017	24,057	+0.26%
2023	23,981	−0.05%

From 1962 to 1999: Population without double counting; for the years following: municipal population.
Source: Ldh/EHESS/Cassini and INSEE (1968-2023)

With 23,981 inhabitants in 2023, Rodez remained the most populous commune of the Aveyron department, ahead of Millau. The communauté d'agglomération Rodez Agglomération had 55,851 inhabitants in 2018, the unité urbaine of Rodez 47,666 inhabitants, and the aire d'attraction of Rodez 111,885 inhabitants. The population of Rodez has reached its maximum in 1975 (25,550), and has stabilized since then around 24,000.

==== Age structure ====
The population of the commune is relatively young in comparison with the department. Especially the age group 15–24 years is larger than average, due to the presence of institutes of higher education in Rodez.

Population by age of Rodez, 2023 (%)

80+	8
65–79	15.5
55–64	11.6
40–54	16.5
25–39	17.8
15–24	18.3
0–14	12.1

Total: 99.8

male

female

Source: INSEE

Population by age of Aveyron, 2023 (%)

90+	9.1
75–89	19.5
60–74	14.6
45–59	18.7
30–44	14.5
15–29	9.2
0–14	14.3

Total: 99.9

male

female

Source: INSEE

=== Education ===
The commune is located in the Academy of Toulouse. The city administers five nursery schools and six elementary schools. The department manages two colleges and the region three lycées.

Écoles
Public		Private
École Fabié	École Foch	École Jeanne d'Arc
École Paul Girard	École Paraire	École Saint-Paul
École Calcomier	École Gourgan	École Sainte-Procule
École Cambon	École Ramadier	École Sainte-Geneviève
École Monteil	École Saint-Félix	École Saint-Joseph
École Cardaillac	École San-Pau	École Sainte-Thérèse
École Flaugergues		

Collèges
Public	Private
Collège Amans Joseph Fabre	Collège Saint-Joseph/Sainte-Geneviève
Collège Départemental Jean Moulin	Collège du Sacré Cœur I et II (Rodez)
Collège des Glycines	Collège du Sacré Cœur (Onet-le-Château)

Lycées
Public	Private
Lycée Ferdinand Foch; General education and vocational	Lycée François d'Estaing; General and technical education Two sites, Boulevard D.Puech and Boulevard d'Estournel
Lycée Alexis-Monteil; General education, vocational, technical and higher	Lycée Saint-Joseph; General education, technical and vocational
Lycée La Roque (Onet-le-Château); Agricultural education, general, technical, vocational and higher	Lycée Louis Querbes; General technical and vocational education Two sites, Rue Béteille and Site du Cedec

==== Higher education ====
Rodez has to date more than 2,500 students on its agglomeration. By 2016, a campus on 6 acres (2.4 ha) with University Library, presence of the Crous, housing will be depending on the site of Saint-Éloi. After the restructuring and extension of the IUT between 2009 and 2012, this campus is implemented throughout the domain of EDF-GDF. Ultimately this site should concentrate more than 10,000 students of science subjects, hydroelectricity, mechanical or food production.

Higher education
- La Roque superior public high school and training centre (Onet-le-Château)
- Alexis Monteil superior public high school
- Louis Querbes private high school (training centre - preparatory classes located on Rue Béteille)
- Charles Carnus private tertiary high school and training centre (Bourran)

- DTS Medical imaging and radiology therapy (IMRT)
- BTS Management of business units (MUC)
- BTS Accounting and management of organizations (CGO)
- BTS Electronic systems (SE)
- BTS Electrotechnical (ELT)

- Champollion Faculty

- Mention license, Economic and Social Administration (AES)
- Mention license, Applied Foreign Languages
- Specialty license, Adapted Physical Activities and Health
- Specialty licence, Education and motor skills
- Specialty licence, Sports management
- Manufacturing license: Conduct and industrial projects management in PMI/PME (PI-CGPI): ecodesign and computerized production of a product
- Manufacturing license: Conduct and industrial projects management in PMI/PME (PI-CGPI): electricity-electronic project management and new technologies
- Manufacturing license: Conduct and industrial projects management in PMI/PME (PI-CGPI) option wood: design/finishing
- Management licence and development of organizations, sports and leisure services (2 courses): Course B: Engineering development of sports and leisure services
- Management license of the physical condition for stakeholders in hostile situations (GCPSH)

- University Institute of technology

- L3 Mention accounting-control
- L3 computer methods applied to management
- LP quality coordinator
- LP insurance, banking, finance: Specialty store
- LP communications officer and customer relations
- LP intranet-internet application development
- LP very small business entrepreneurship
- LP management of industrial logistics activities
- LP council professions in training
- DU accounting, law and corporate finance - Preparation for the DCG
- DUT GEA
- DUT data processing
- OTC QLIO
- OTC information communication

- University Institute of Nursing Training

- Bachelor of nursing (Bac + 3)

- Training Institute of Masseurs-physiotherapists

- State of physiotherapist diploma (Bac + 3)

- Institute of training of caregivers

- Diploma of State of caregiver

- University Institute of Teacher Training
- Research and Training Institute for the stone trades
- Chamber of Commerce and industry (CCI) of Rodez-Villefranche-Espalion, consular training centre. Several sites in Rodez including one in the district of Bourran:

- Training level Bac+2 courses: (BTS Management of the business units (MUC), business unit manager, BTS negotiation (NRC), BTS Assistant of management PME PMI client relationship
- Training level Bac+3 courses: Bachelor EGC, Professional Licence leadership position, Professional License street lighting, Professional License NTIC applied to tourism
- Training level Bac+4 training: Management of the environment of industrial risk and security (MERIS)
- Training level Bac+5 training: Computer engineer

- Departmental Association of the Social Promotion of Agriculture (ADPSA) in Rodez
- National School of Music of Aveyron (ENM) in Rodez
- Gréta Rouergue Training in Rodez (the station quarter)
- Chamber of Trade, in Rodez Aveyron

==== Employability ====
The Communal Office of Employment Training (MCEF), located at 41-43 Rue Béteille opened its doors in March 2013 after two years of work. This area of 2,500 square metres (27,000 sq ft) includes the employment centre and its service platform, the local mission for employment of youth, the inter-institutional centre of personal and professional skills assessment (CIBC), the Information Centre and Orientation (academic inspection), the territorial office Aveyron, (Note: Service of the Regional Council for Vocational Training) Cap Employment, (Note: Association working for the employment of disabled people) the AFIJ (graduates) and the Aveyron branch of ADEFPAT (Note: Association for development through training in the countries of Aveyron, Tarn, Lot and Tarn-et-Garonne) which is a regional structure whose mission is to reinforce the strategies of territorial development. 55 employees work on all the services present in this institution which covers a pool of 142,000 inhabitants.

==== Educational associations ====
The Calandreta schools (in Occitan, petite alouette) are Franco-Occitan bilingual colleges and schools.

=== Health ===
==== Jacques-Puel Hospital ====
This medical, surgical, gynaecology and obstetrics (MCO) hospital with emergency adult and paediatric facilities, is the second regional technical platform after the CHU de Purpan in Toulouse. It is the headquarters of the SAMU and SMUR of Aveyron, and has nearly 60 medical and surgical services. Specialised and ultra-specialised in the disciplines of medicine, paediatrics, neonatology, oncology and surgery, it holds medical equipment of the latest generation.

==== Saint-Louis surgical specialties clinic ====
After a restructuring between 2007 and 2010, the Saint-Louis Clinic is a large installation between the Boulevard d'Estournel, Rue Cabrière and 22 Rue Béteille. Two buildings of three floors joined by an underground level and raised tunnels are built on a total area of 6,000 square metres (65,000 sq ft). This clinic is equipped with a laboratory for medical analyses and a radiological platform equipped with an MRI scanner. Each floor extends over 900 square metres (9,700 sq ft) and the last floor, with 24 beds, is dedicated to post-operative care specialised in cardio-pneumology. 100 beds, all disciplines, are operational in this surgical facility. Surgical specialties in this clinic are: The clinic was closed in January 2014.

Medico-surgical specialties - Saint-Louis Clinic
- General, visceral and digestive surgery
- Urologic surgery
- Vascular surgery
- Hepatology and gastroenterology
- Gynaecological surgery
- Plastic and reconstructive surgery
- Orthopedic surgery, hand surgery
- Otolaryngology and head and neck surgery
- Ophthalmic surgery
- Medical biology
- Medical imaging (radiology, scanner, MRI, etc.)
- Post-operative care in cardio-pneumology

==== Other centres of care nearby ====
In the commune of Olemps, 5 kilometres (3.1 mi) from Rodez, are also the Les Peyrières Hospital and Sainte-Marie Hospital.

=== Sports ===
Rodez is home to Rodez AF (called le Raf by its fans) of the Ligue 2 (Second Division). The women's team is in the First Division and are known as les Rafettes. Rodez also has rugby, basketball, handball and fencing teams.

==== Infrastructure ====
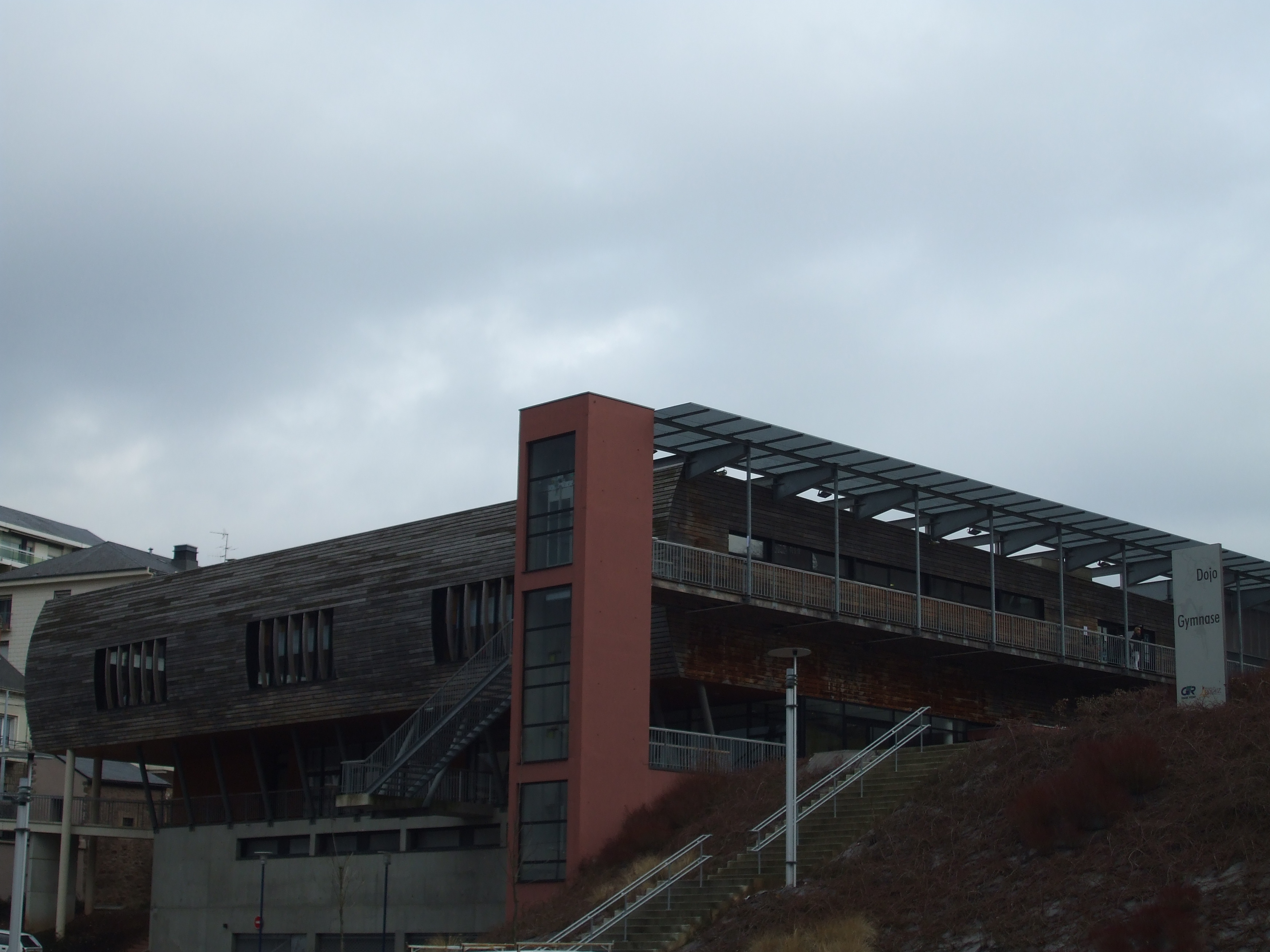
The Dojo gym

The city has numerous sports facilities. Most of these facilities have been reunited in what is called the Vallon des Sports, at the level of Pré Lamarque in the Western Quarter. It is composed of the dojo gym, sports rooms of l'Amphithéâtre and the Aquavallon aquatic centre. The Paul Lignon Stadium is located nearby. Many other sports complexes are present in the metropolitan area. All these facilities are intended to improve the reception of sports clubs of the city, whether they are independent or federated in combination as the Rodez Omnisports Stadium.

The various sports institutions: (Note: Magazine Bonjour Rodez - December 2006)

- L'Amphithéâtre Cultural Centre has several rooms in order to practice badminton, basketball, boxing, climbing, fencing, martial arts, gymnastics and table tennis.
- Dojo gym: Badminton, basketball, handball, volleyball, judo
- Paul Lignon Stadium: Football, rugby
- The Vabre complex: Athletics, basketball, football, handball, rugby, tennis, volleyball
- The Trauc complex: Football, quilles de huit, rugby, archery
- Louis Polonia Stadium: Football, pétanque, quilles de huit
- Boulodromes of Camonil and Saint-Éloi: Petanque
- Fabre Gymnasium: Basketball, volleyball
- Avenue de Paris, Sports Valley, Le Trauc: Shooting stands
- Ramadier City Stadium: Basketball, football
- Nautical centre: Swimming, competitions, aquatic activities, sauna, hammam
- Domaine de Combelles: Riding centre

The city of Rodez hosted the Jumping international de France in 2009, Top 12 of the SRA in 2009, international Championship of aerobic gymnastics in 2010, Championship of the world of women's basketball for under-17s in 2010 and the 2010 Tour de France. Rodez will welcome the return of the Tour de France in 2015, for the finish of Stage 13, on 17 July, and the departure of Stage 14, on 18 July.

==== Associations ====
The basketball club of Stade Rodez Aveyron plays in the Nationale masculine 3, football clubs including Rodez Aveyron Football in the Ligue 2 for the men's team and in Division 1 for the women's team, and in rugby Stade Rodez Aveyron plays in Federale 1. These are the principal sports clubs of the commune. In fencing, Rodez Aveyron currently plays in Division 1 for men's team and women's team. The men's team was champion of France's division 1 in 2012 and 2014, 3rd in the European Cup of Champion Clubs in 2013 and runner up of Europe 2015. The Rodez Badminton (CBR) Club organises a tournament every year of national scope at l'Amphithéâtre. The Aveyronnais, very fond of bowling games, participate each year for the Championship of France of quilles de huit, beginning in August. The Vélo-Club Ruthénois [Ruthénois Cycling Club], founded in 1891, is the oldest sports club in the city.

- R.A.F. (Rodez Aveyron Football)
- R.S.A. (Stade Rodez Aveyron), rugby
- S.R.A.B. (Stade Rodez Aveyron Basket)
- C.B.R. (Rodez Badminton Club)
- Rodez athletics stadium
- Stage Ruthenois Tennis
- Gym-Club Ruthenois
- Judo Rodez Aveyron
- Grand Rodez swimming
- Fencing Rodez Aveyron
- Vélo-Club Ruthenois
- Sport keel Ruthenois
- R.O.C. Aveyron Handball
- Combelles riding club

=== Military life ===
Headquarters of the Army of Aveyron, located in Rodez, near Bourran.

The regiments whose barracks were in Rodez:

- 81st regiment of infantry (1879-1897)
- 122nd regiment of infantry (1913)

Non-divisional elements:

- 322nd infantry regiment, split from the 122nd infantry regiment in 1914
- 124th territorial infantry regiment

=== Media ===
==== Local and regional print media ====
Rodez is the seat of the Centre Presse newspaper. It is part of the Les Journaux du Midi Group. The group lies in vast premises, on Avenue Victor Hugo, at the foot of the Cathedral of Rodez. Indeed, there are three daily newspapers of local and regional news being edited every day, namely the Centre Presse, La Dépêche du Midi and Midi Libre.

In addition, a Rodez weekly based on the news of the agglomeration of the Grand Rodez is produced on Le Piton, namely Le Ruthénois. A monthly journal is published by the General Council of Aveyron which tells the news of the institution each month, and the same for the city of Rodez which has its own monthly called Rodez, notre ville [Rodez, our city]. Finally, a quarterly published by the Midi-Pyrénées region is delivered to the mailbox of each person in Rodez.

With regard to the history of the Rodez press, some newspapers have disappeared namely La Gazette du Rouergue (1832-1835), L'Écho de l'Aveyron and Le Peuple.

==== National and international press ====
The city has the national and international press in its kiosks. To facilitate the work on press articles, the media library of Rodez contains many archives, such as the departmental archives and the house of the press.

==== Radio ====
Apart from all major national stations to which the city of Rodez can access, other local radio stations are also available such as Totem which has a registered office in Luc-la-Primaube, Radio cent pour cent [100% Radio], Radio Menergy and CFM (107.9FM), which has its studios in Rodez. Finally, Radio Temps [Time Radio] (107 FM) was created in the Lycée Louis Querbes.

==== Television ====
The commune has had digital terrestrial television channels since 1 June 2008. In addition, a branch of France 3 Sud, for France 3 Quercy-Rouergue, is headquartered in Bourran and thus allows Rodez news to be brought to television. A television studio is installed here in order to present the newscasts for Quercy-Rouergue Aveyron-Lot. Finally, the idea of establishing a continuous channel dedicated to the town of Rodez was born. The city of Rodez has broadcast digital television channels to replace analogue broadcasts, since 8 November 2011.

==== Internet and telephony ====
Rodez has broadband internet cable technology and Wi-Fi as well as commissioning, in 2008, several kilometres of fibre optic coupled to WiMAX and UMTS base stations across Grand Rodez and particularly to trading areas such as the international airport, railway station, Bourran Quarter and the historic centre. The 3G, 3G+ and 4G networks allow the digital opening up of the city of Rodez. The various road works, in the city centre, and especially in the historic heart, allowed new internet loops of very high-speed to be built between 2011 and 2012.

=== Religion, philosophical and humanist associations ===
The city of Rodez, seat of the bishopric, is part of the parish of Our Lady of the Assumption, which includes 6 branches: Cathedral Notre-Dame de Rodez, Saint Amans, Le Monastère, La Mouline, Gorgan and Sacré-Cœur. François Fonlupt is the Bishop of Rodez since 2011.

The Protestant temple of Rodez (Reformed Church of France) was erected in 1947, on Rue Louis Lacombe.

The Evangelical Reformed Church of Rodez is located on the Séverac road to Onet-le-Château.

The Rodez mosque built on the Avenue de Bamberg between 2000 and 2002, was inaugurated in May 2003. The religious building was expanded between 2010 and 2011.

Rodez has several Masonic Lodges:

- "La Parfaite Union" (Grand Orient de France) created in 1762 and in which Paul Ramadier was initiated in 1913.
- "Le Réveil du Rouergue" (Grande Loge de France)
- "Le Droit Humain"

=== Cultural events and festivities ===
In summer, the city offers many entertainments and festive events. Three museums and many art galleries (Gallery Sainte-Catherine among others) attract many tourists. Finally on the side of young people, Grand Rodez student associations are present and, in addition, throughout the year, many bar-restaurants and bar-discos of the city participate in entertainment on the Ruthenois Piton ("terrasses en fêtes" [terraces in festivals], for example).

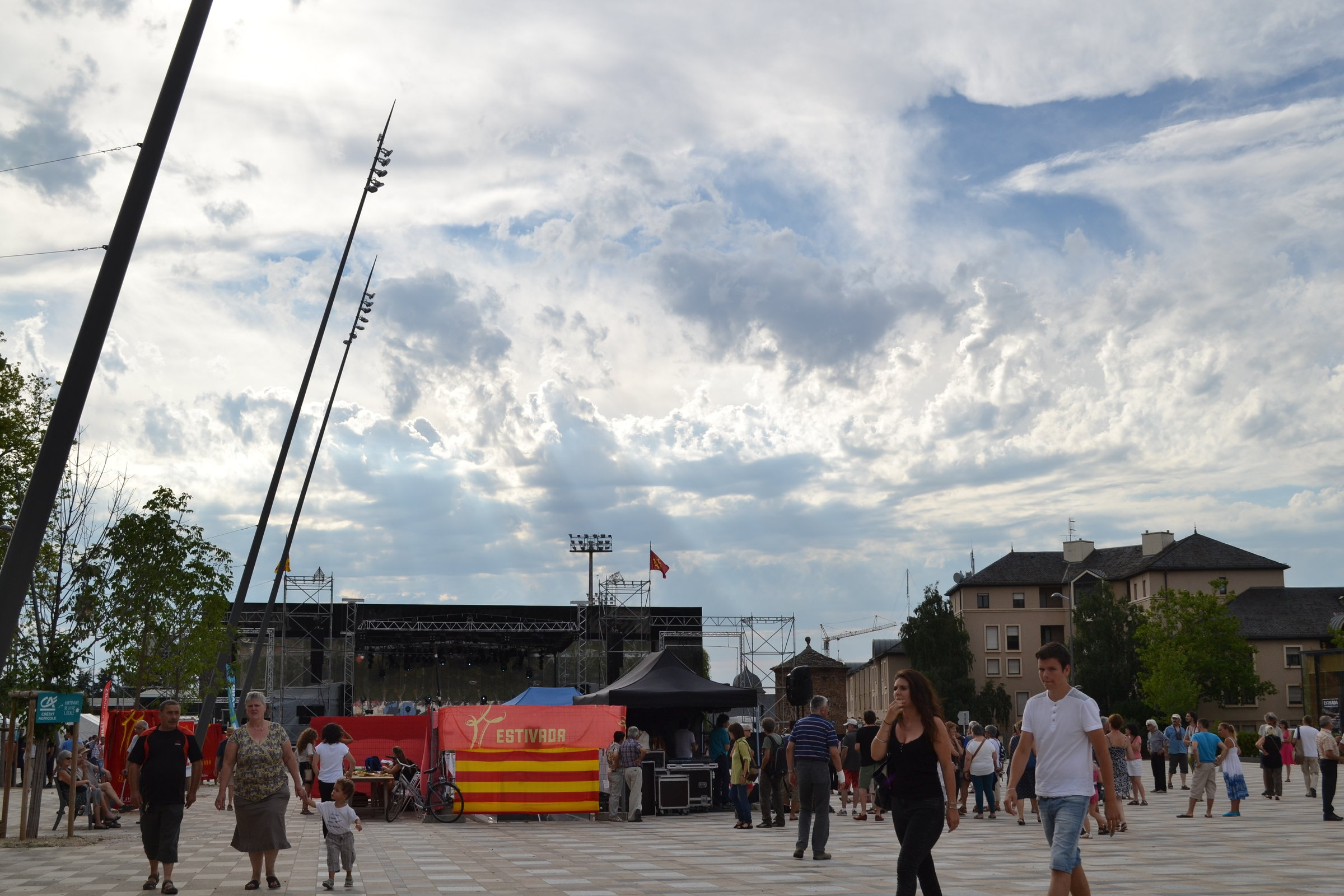
Estivada 2015

There are several music venues and festivals in or near Rodez. Music venues La Guinguette and Le Studio often host concerts, as does the local amphitheatre, and the local Maisons des Jeunes et de la Culture of Rodez and Onet-Le-Château.

Skabazac is probably the best-known music festival, and it takes place in mid-June. Just on the outskirts of Rodez in a town called Sébazac, Skabazac attracted over 30,000 people in 2010, when Cypress Hill headlined. In 2011 the festival's 13th edition was cancelled due to a lack of government funding. In midsummer the Occitan festival, called Estivada, takes place over several days. The festival promotes Occitan culture with food, cultural displays, and live music.

In order to preserve the traditions of folklore and the Occitan language, the langue d'Oc, two folk groups are based in Rodez. La Pastourelle (the young Shepherdess in Occitan) founded in 1948 and the Escloupeto (the carrier of hooves in Occitan) in 1953. It is through music, dances, songs and costumes from southern folklore that the various volunteers, we are revisiting the era. Occitan theatre is also part of their repertoire. The popular folklore of the Aveyron was created in Pont-de-Salars, at the International Folklore Festival of Rouergue in 1955.

Non-exhaustive main cultural events and festivities
Spring	In May, the Antonin-Artaud award ceremony is held; Museum night
Summer	In early June, the important festival of Skabazac.; Mid-June, a large funfair.; On 21 June, Rodez deploy scenes around the city on the occasion of the feast of music.; In July, a medieval market place. In effect, many craftsmen, actors, jugglers and costumed musicians involved.; At the same time, the rally of Rouergue.; Also in July, the Estivada (Languedoc word pronounced [esti'βaδo]), an Occitan festival, is a four-day showcase of Occitan creation, through the music, stories, theatre, dance, film and conviviality. This event brings together 35,000 people.; Cit'équestre (horses); In August, le Foirail public garden welcomes Rodez beach.; In early August the International Rouergue folklore festival is held.; At the same time, mobile cinemas are in the city as well as open-air theatre performances.; At the end of August is the Ramazick festival; In early September, the banks of the Aveyron, a flea market, musical aperitif, fishing competitions and various events at the Vuoto.
Autumn	Heritage days; The Photosfolies; In autumn, the former book salon, chocolate lounge; Amphithéâtre: A cultural program shows which each year attracts more than 15,000 spectators with a record occupancy rate of 90% for 6 years. It regularly hosts large scale artists.
Winter	In December, a Christmas market and ice rink are installed throughout the period in the Place Foch.
All year	Amphithéâtre: A cultural program shows which each year attracts more than 15,000 spectators with a record occupancy rate of 90% for 6 years. It regularly hosts large scale artists.

== Economy ==
Rodez asserts itself from an economic and tourist perspective at the centre of a triangle formed by Toulouse at the southwest, the regional prefecture located 130 kilometres (81 mi) from the Piton Ruthenois, at the southeast by Montpellier 180 kilometres (110 mi) and to the north by Clermont-Ferrand, the farthest, located 260 kilometres (160 mi) away.

Over the main city of the province, with 20,000 inhabitants, Rodez is, according to INSEE the 13th most prosperous urban unit of France just behind most of the cities in Île-de-France such as Saint-Cloud, Courbevoie, Paris and Suresnes. It is the 28th city where there are the most "jobs on the spot", Rodez is also the 91st commune of France in terms of viable start-ups by inhabitants (1 per 116 inhabitants) and the 157th in terms of share of taxed households representing 58 per cent (well above the national average). This result can be explained by two mechanisms. First, the diversity of the economic base is that companies of Rodez touch on numerous and varied areas. Moreover, Rodez was for many years separated from the major national economies without relevant communications. To do this, it endeavoured by its own skills to produce and build its own corporate panel in order to sustain its territory.

=== Income of the population and taxation ===
In 2017, the median income per household was €20,410, and 51% of households had to pay income tax.

=== Employment ===
Today, Rodez is the main employment area of Aveyron. The population is organized around Grand Rodez, which concentrates the largest number of jobs with high-growth sectors as health, education, trade, food processing (dairy, cheese, meat processing), the wood furniture sector, mechanics, computer science, tertiary industries, aviation and research. The Aveyron inhabitants have three lives in the area of influence of Rodez. The geographical location of Rodez at the junction of the major Aveyron communication routes has long channelled a rural exodus to the prefecture: The presence of an airport and the improvement of the road network to Toulouse today contributes to the dynamism of the Rodez area with the emergence of many jobs.

In January 2017, the active population of the municipality was 10,994 people, or 70.4% of its inhabitants aged 15–64 years. The unemployment rate among those aged 15–64 was 9.2%.

Distribution over 15 years by sector of activity (2017)
	Agriculture	Industry	Construction	Commerce	Services
Rodez	0.8%	7.9%	4.9%	43.4%	43.0%

=== Businesses ===
Rodez and its agglomeration focus a wide range of businesses and economic sectors, by automotive equipment with the Bosch Group, by research on GMOs and the distribution of seeds for agriculture with the national headquarters of the RAGT group within the grouping Biogemma, aeronautics with the Sofop working for Airbus Industries or its international airport platform, health with its hospital, computing with the Sopra Group, and the food industry. This set of dynamics places the agglomeration of Rodez in second place in economic growth in the Midi-Pyrénées after its regional capital, Toulouse. These companies are one of the keys to the "engineering valley".

Rodez is the seat of the Chamber of Commerce and Industry of Aveyron located in the city centre and in the district of Bourran. The Grand Rodez is the second largest economy of southwestern France where there are 2,700 companies in Grand Rodez and 1,500 in the centre of Rodez. Finally, there was an increase of 14.5% for the creation of companies on Rodez and its region between 2000 and 2006. The rate of survival of businesses was 71.5%, three years after opening. Major centres include:

- The Hospital Group of Rodez with its 2,000 employees is the second platform of health of the Midi-Pyrénées region.
- Robert Bosch Rodez with 1,700 employees is the largest industrial employer in the department of Aveyron. Designated reference site in regards to glow plugs, the injector "common rail", became the standard on diesel systems, is the "flagship" product, according to the director of the Albert Weitten Group. The company of the project was expected to produce 1,800,000 for 2011.
- National headquarters of the RAGT, located in the district of Bourran, brings together 250 scientists from a total of 1,000 employees.
- The Sainte-Marie Clinic in Rodez: 1,000 employees
- The Saint-Louis Clinic in Rodez: closed in 2013
- OPRA Group Inforsud with 400 employees (computer engineering).
- Verdie Travel Group employs 250 employees and many seasonal (tour operators)

In the year 2018, 208 companies were created in the territory.

Distribution of businesses by sector (Dec 2015)
	Total	Industry	Construction	Trade, transport and services	Public sector
Number of establishments	3,268	139	258	2,265	605
%	100%	4.2%	7.9%	68.9%	18.4%

=== Economic centres of the territory ===
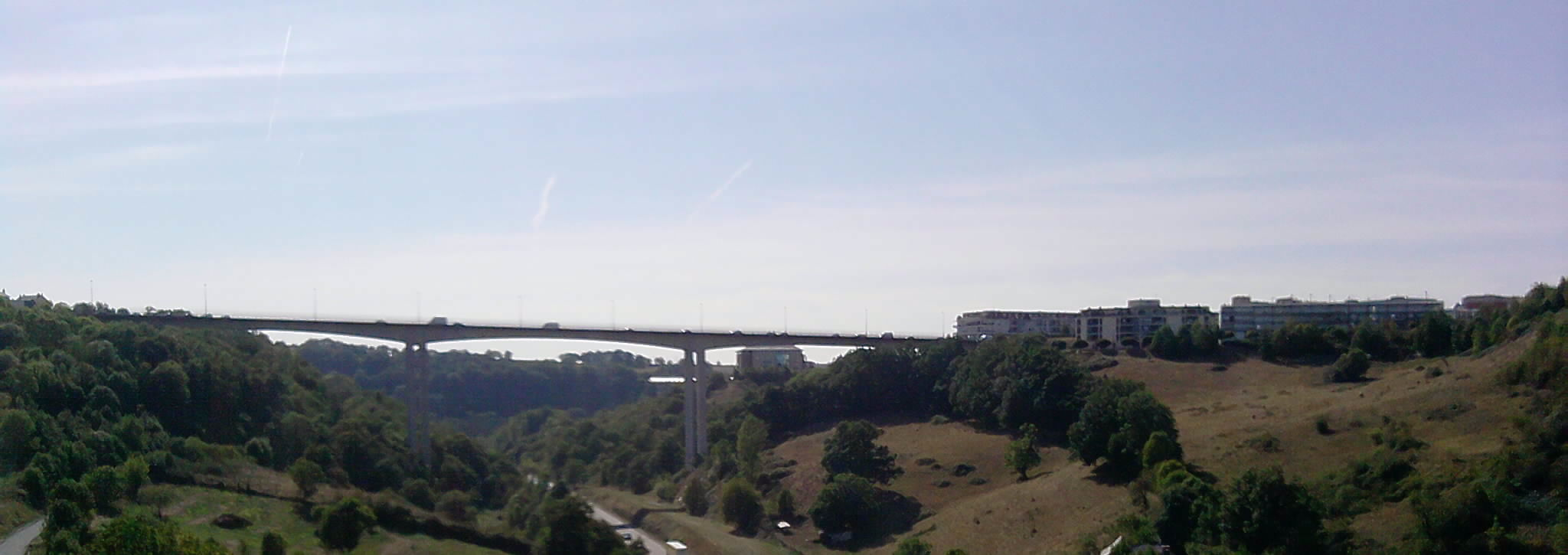
The Viaduct de l'Europe: Gateway to the Rodez economy between the city centre and the Bourra Quarter

The present economic hubs on Rodez and/or its suburbs are closely linked with the chef-lieu. Found:

- Zone of the Comtal, with dozens of national commercial or local signs, all established over 55 hectares (140 acres), it is the first commercial area of its department and one of the most important in its region.
- Bourran Quarter: Services and administrations of the State, private enterprises, health.
- Zone of Bel Air: Close to the international airport of Rodez, it is the first business park of Grand Rodez. Spread over 200 hectares (490 acres) and in structuring business for the whole territory, Bel Air is a recognized Regional Interest Zone of the Midi-Pyrénées. 160 companies are located here.
- Zone of La Gineste: With its 10 hectares (25 acres) in the heart of Rodez, it focuses in trade activities and services dominant to new technologies. A dozen companies are located here, including RM Ingénierie [RM Engineering], ETI, RDS and D’Médica.
- Zone of the Balquières: Automotive centre of Grand Rodez, located just outside Rodez. Several companies are present including Peugeot, Citroën, Ford, Volvo, Land Rover, Mercedes, etc.
- Zone of Cantaranne: One of the areas of "historic" activities dedicated to industry, craft and wholesale trade in the communes of Onet-le-Château and Rodez. Forty companies are already installed on 68 hectares (170 acres), including: Bosch (1700 employees), Lactalis, Drimmer, Bonneviale, Mathou, Thermatic, Garrigues SA, etc.
- Zone of Arsac: Agri-food area of 47 hectares (120 acres) in the commune of Sainte-Radegonde
- Zone of Naujac: Business Park of 20 hectares (49 acres), in the commune of Luc-La Primaube, devoted to crafts and industry. 25 companies are installed including Eiffage-construction.
- Zone of Montvert: This is located at Luc-La Primaube, and devoted to crafts and small logistics (on the edge of the RN88).
- Zone of Malan: Crafts and industry, an exhibition park in 2016.

=== Agriculture ===
Rodez is traditionally an agricultural trade centre. The city is the headquarters of Aveyron agriculture through its departmental chamber of agriculture. However, within the city walls, Rodez has little to no farming (0.8% of the distribution of jobs). Instead, it focuses in this field of research, including for example the RAGT or Lycée La Roque. Beyond the city and agglomeration, agricultural activity is present. During the 2011 session of the Congress of Young Farmers held in Rodez, Bruno Le Maire, Minister of Food, Agriculture and Fisheries, as well as Rurality and Development, came to close this congress.

=== Trade ===
Rodez and its suburbs have developed local trade and large national brands, during the 21st century, to avoid a brain drain to the major centres like Toulouse and Montpellier. The city developed businesses in the city centre and its surroundings (commercial hub of Le Comtal located at Sébazac-Concourès).

The city market is held three times per week (Wednesday morning, Friday afternoon and Saturday morning). A large fair happens each quarter on Le Piton in Rodez.

The commune of Cransac, located 30 kilometres (19 mi) away, has planned the establishment of a casino which is scheduled to open in March 2015.

=== Tourism ===
Due to the geographical location of Rodez, between the Millau Viaduct and Conques, but also close to cities of the Midi such as Toulouse and Montpellier, its 2,000 years old historical past offers culture with museums, including the Musée Soulages. The development of road, rail and air transport, and also its UNESCO World Heritage candidacy contributes to a positive and dynamic tourist area (300,000 tourists each year to the Rodez Cathedral). Finally, the office of tourism of Rodez conducts guided tours of the monuments and landmarks of the city. However, beyond the city, tourists have also turned to the major centres of the department such as the lakes of Lévézou, Conques, Laguiole to the north of the department. The Millau Viaduct to the south provides the junction of the A75 to the Mediterranean Sea and also the most beautiful villages of France which place the department of Aveyron at the forefront of the French departments hosting the prettiest villages. Finally, Rodez has two promotional clips of the city issued by Grand-Rodez and the "Great Sites of Midi-Pyrénées" group. The Grand Rodez tourist office is located on the Place de la Cité (opened in July 2013).

Some data
- The Office of Tourism of Rodez is classified 3 ***
- Certified Qualité Tourisme
- Guided tours of the Office of Tourism: 10,000 visitors
- 90,000 tourists welcomed each year
- 211,645 overnight stays in hotels in 2008 (63% business clientele, 37% tourist)
- Many signs in the city centre indicate strategic and historic places of Rodez.
- For accommodation, around 12 establishments are present on the agglomeration. In addition, a campsite with 80 plots is available for holidaymakers.

=== Gastronomy ===
There are three weekly farmers' markets. On Wednesday mornings the market is located in Place du Bourg. On Saturday mornings, the market expands into Place de la Cité and Place Emma Calvé (behind the cathedral). On Friday evenings there is a small farmers' market on the Parking du Sacré Cœur.

Several restaurants serve local specialities, notably aligot, farçous, tripoux, and Roquefort, Laguiole, and Cantal cheeses, as well as red wine from the nearby village of Marcillac. Fouace is a breakfast item, a sweet bread that can be found in many local bakeries.

== Local culture and heritage ==
The town centre is almost exclusively pedestrianised and is filled with history, as well as shops and local artisans. The agglomeration of Grand Rodez comprises the towns of Rodez, Onet-le-Château, Druelle, Luc-la-Primaube, Le Monastère, Olemps, Sainte-Radegonde and Sébazac-Concourès.

=== Places and monuments ===
Most of the important buildings of the city are located in Vieux-Rodez. In addition, many buildings, houses, places, places of worship and châteaux are registered and protected by the state.

Since 3 February 2012, the Ruthenois Piton is classified among the "big sites" of Midi-Pyrénées and a steering committee is preparing the candidature of Rodez to the label of Towns and Lands of Art and History as well as the UNESCO World Heritage.

==== Religious buildings ====
===== Notre-Dame Cathedral =====
Made an Historic Monument in 1862.

The Cathedral of Notre-Dame of Rodez is the main religious building of the department. Burned, damaged over the centuries, the Cathedral of Rodez is a compendium of architectural styles from the 13th century to the 17th century: Gothic, Renaissance and Baroque interior decoration elements. It's central nave is 102 metres (335 ft) long and has an elevation of 30 metres (98 ft). The building is equipped with a bell tower, laced pink sandstone, standing at 87 metres (285 ft). Four hundred steps climb to reach the statue of the Virgin (located at the top of the bell tower) and the panorama of the city. At night, it is illuminated from inside.

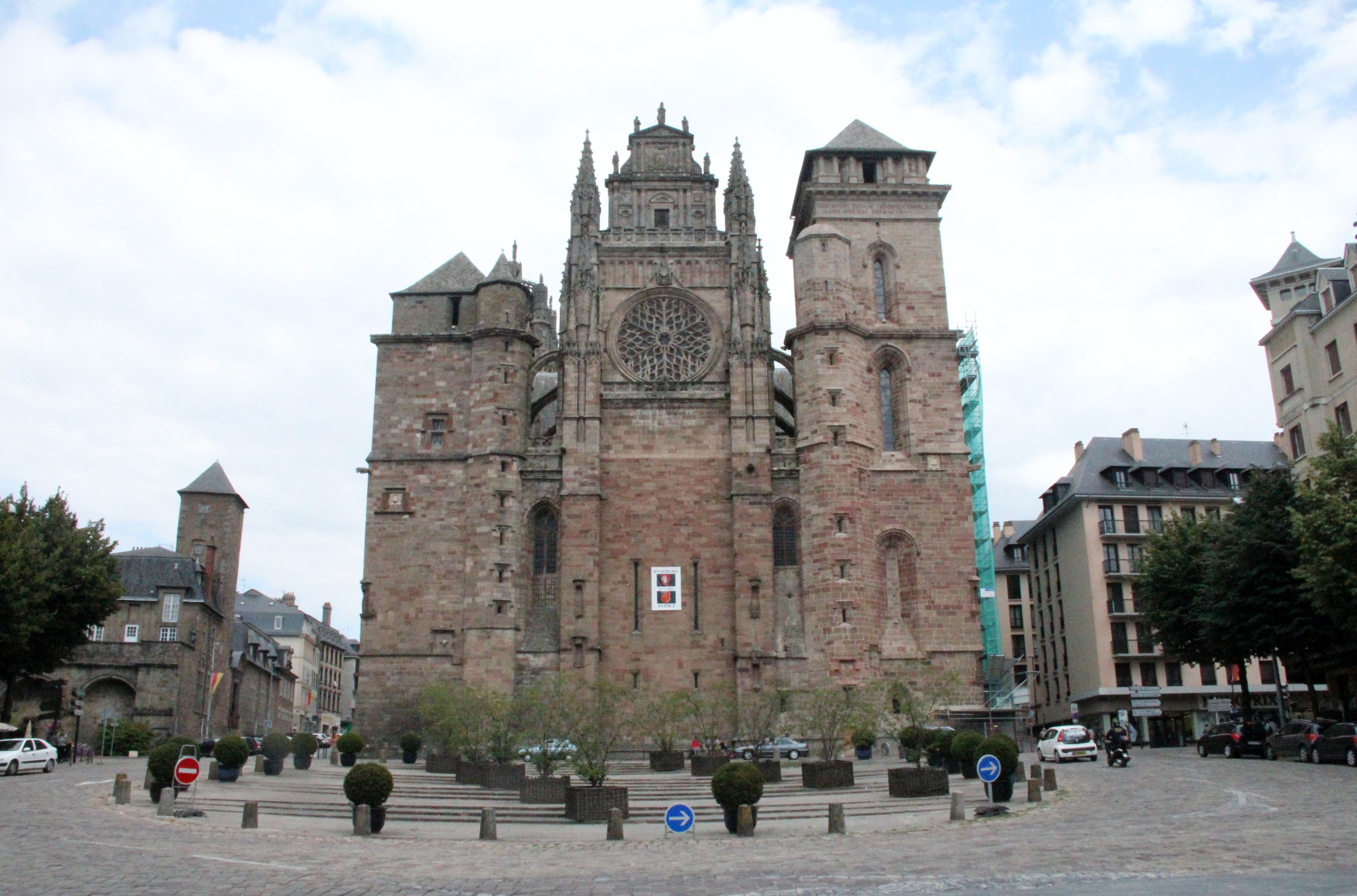

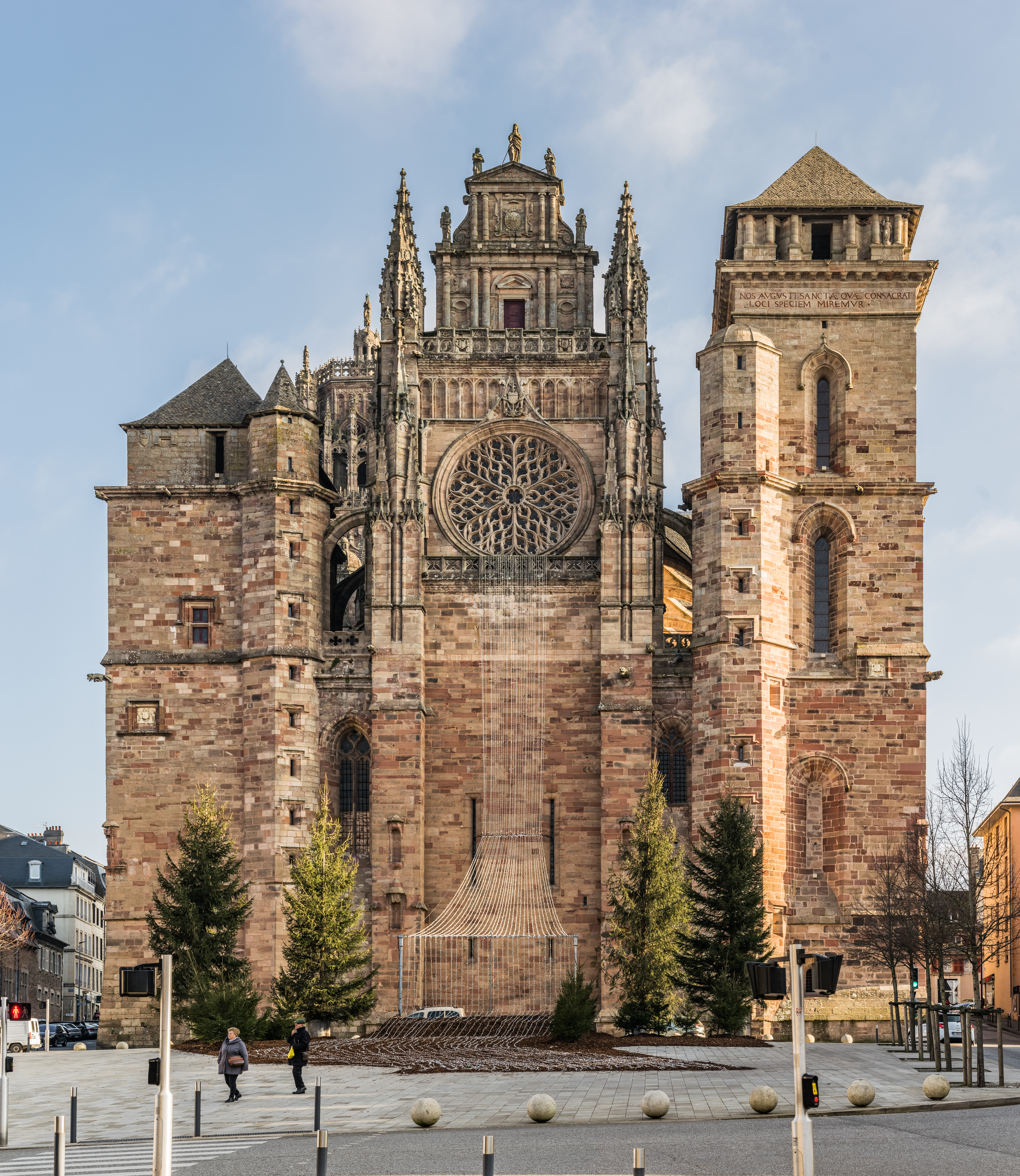

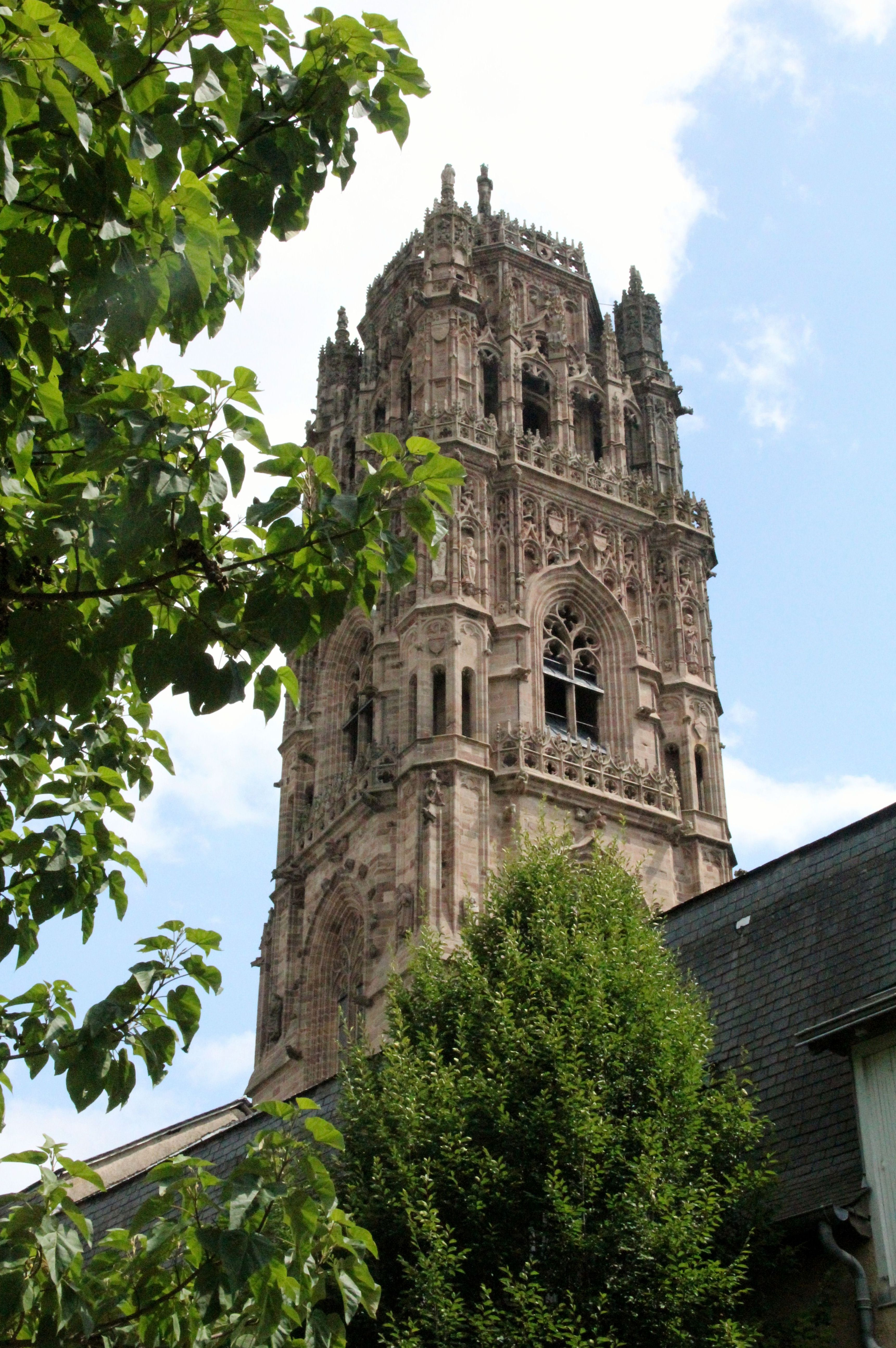

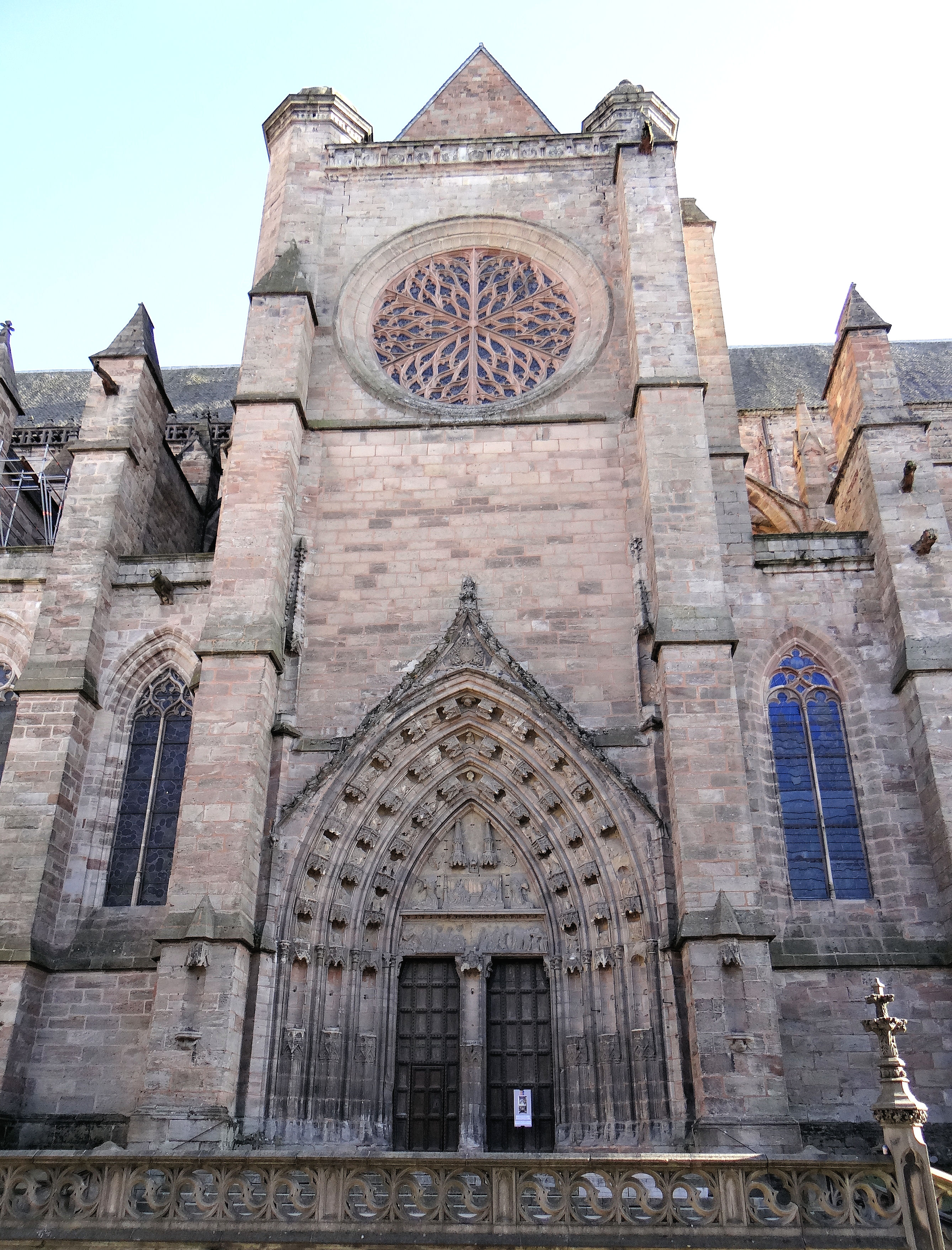

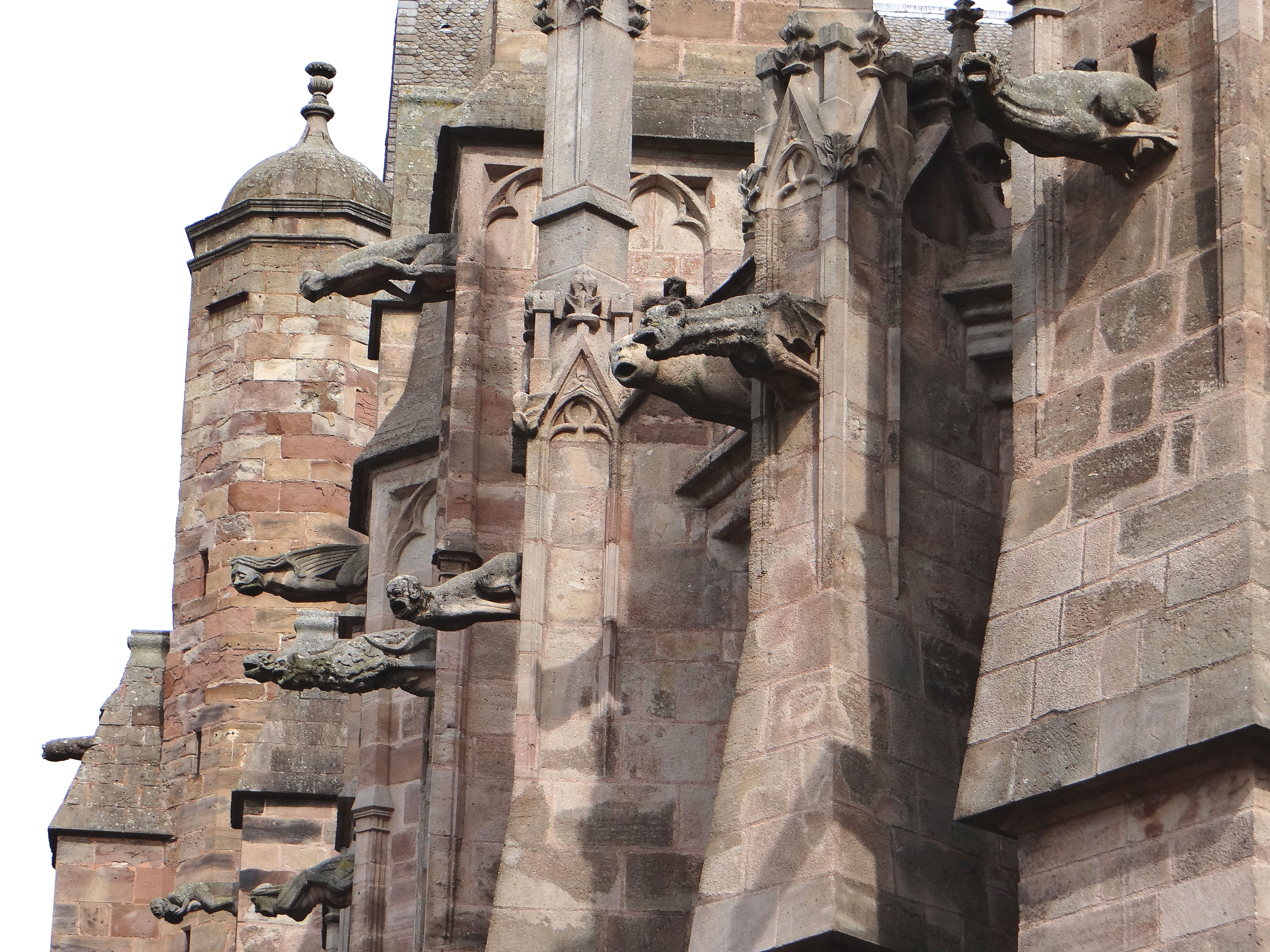
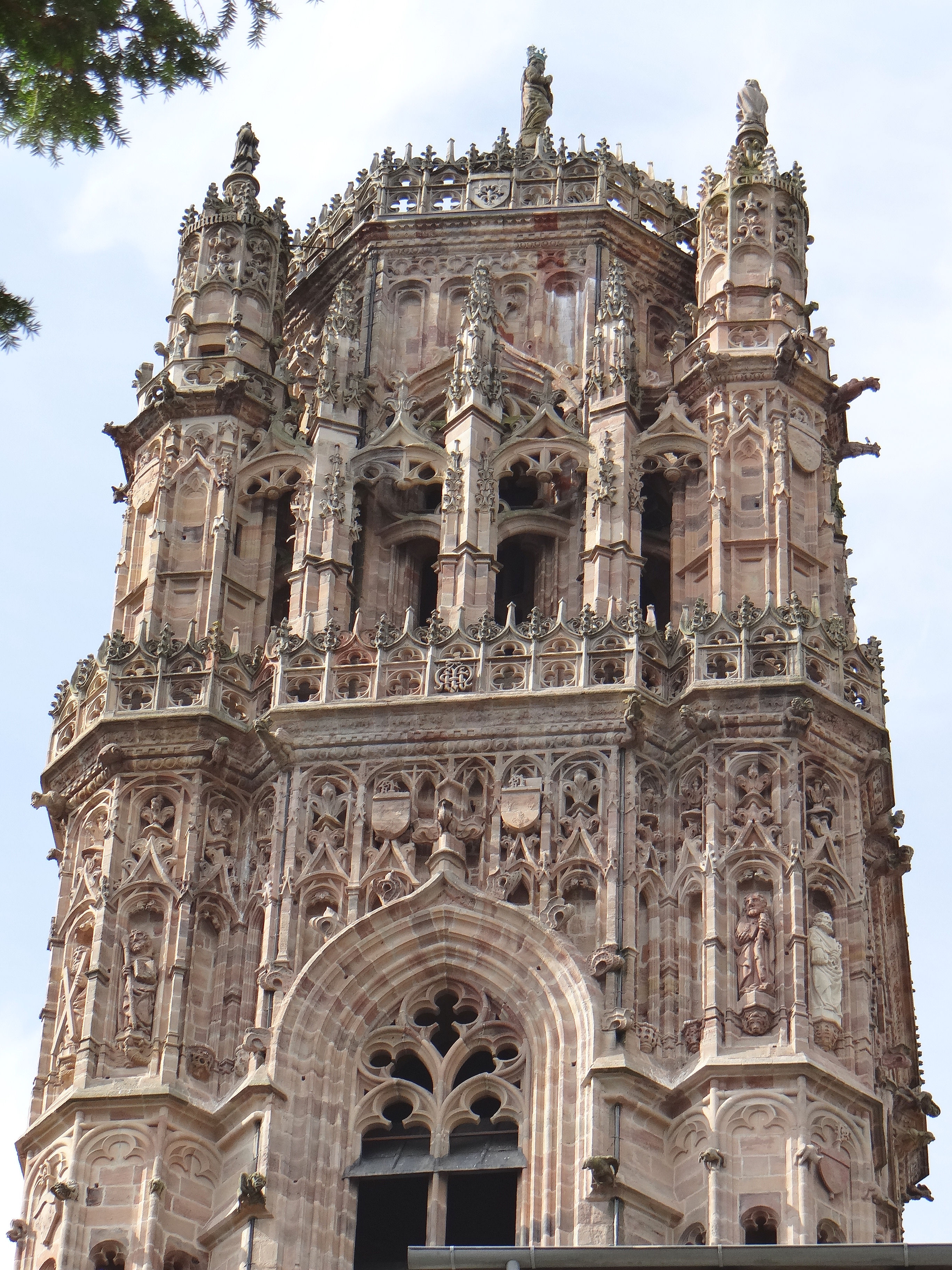

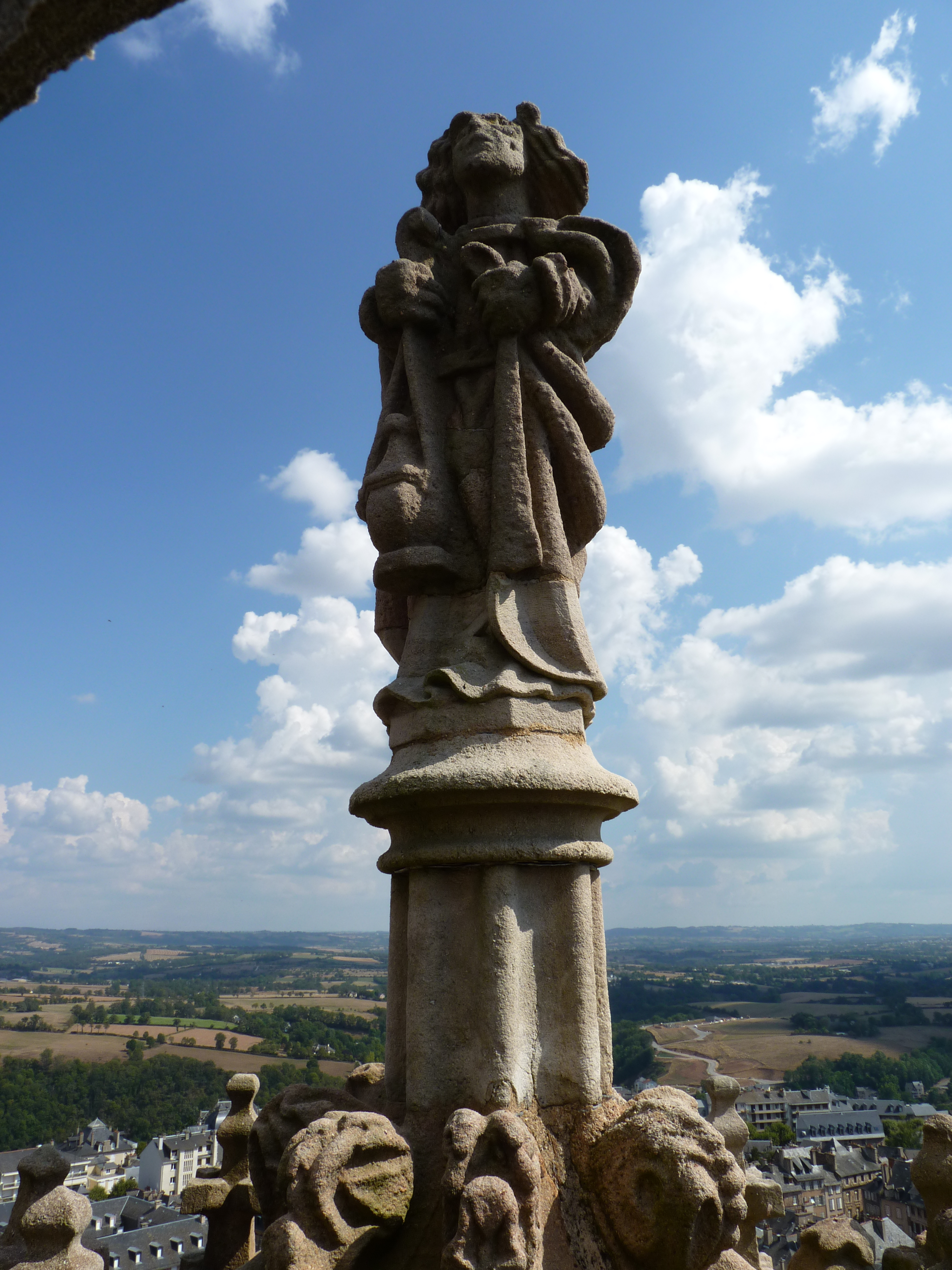

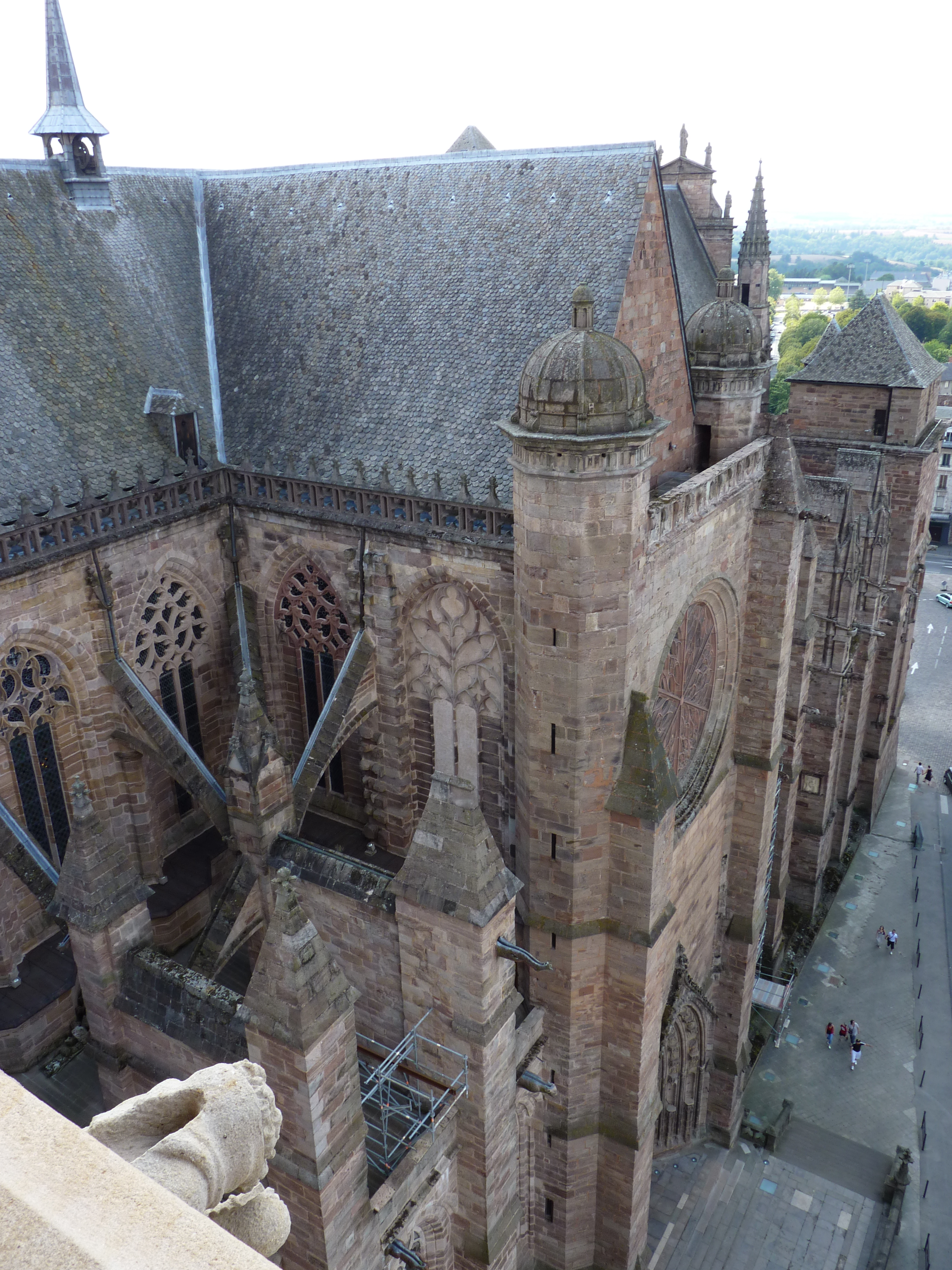

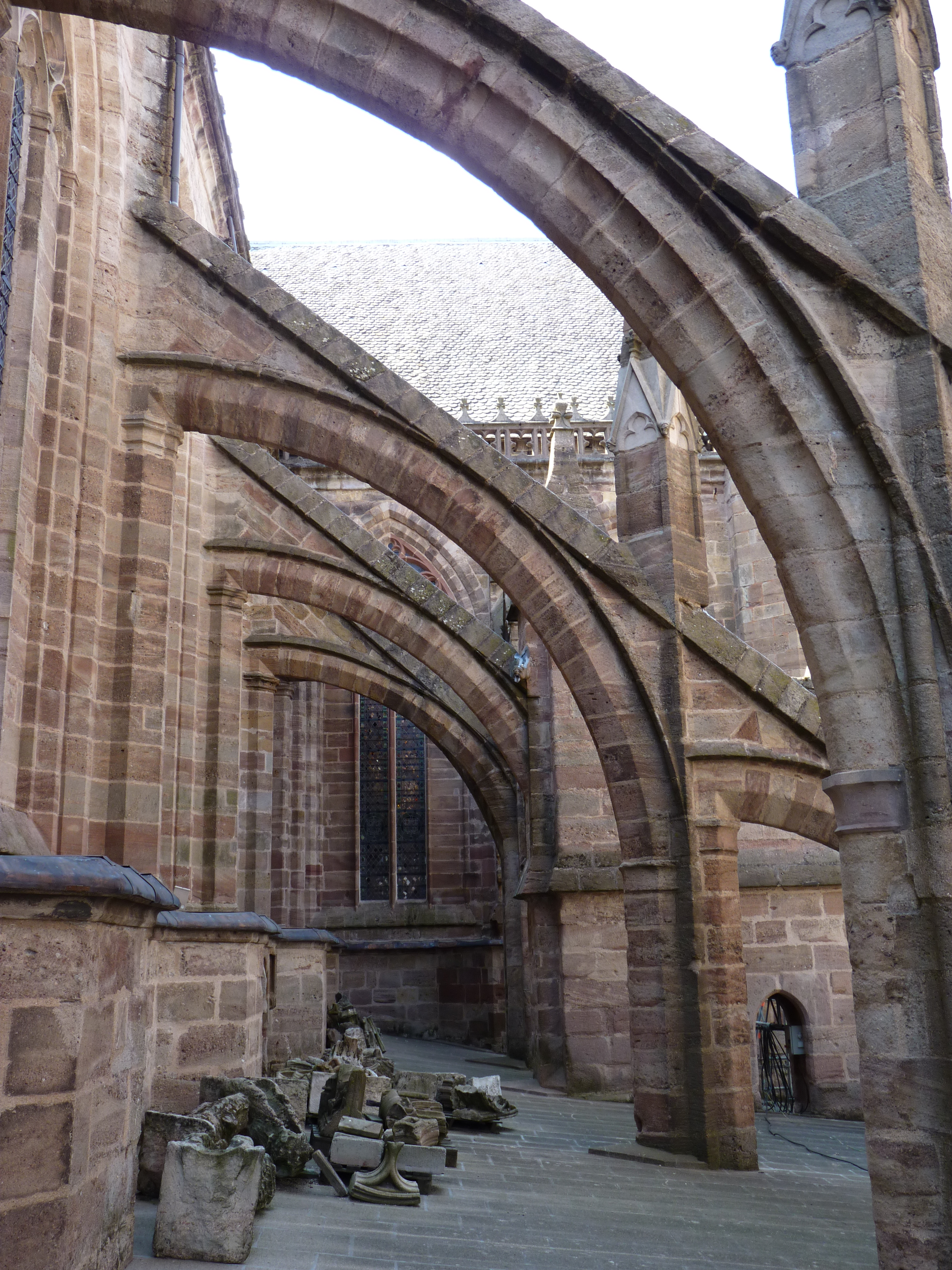

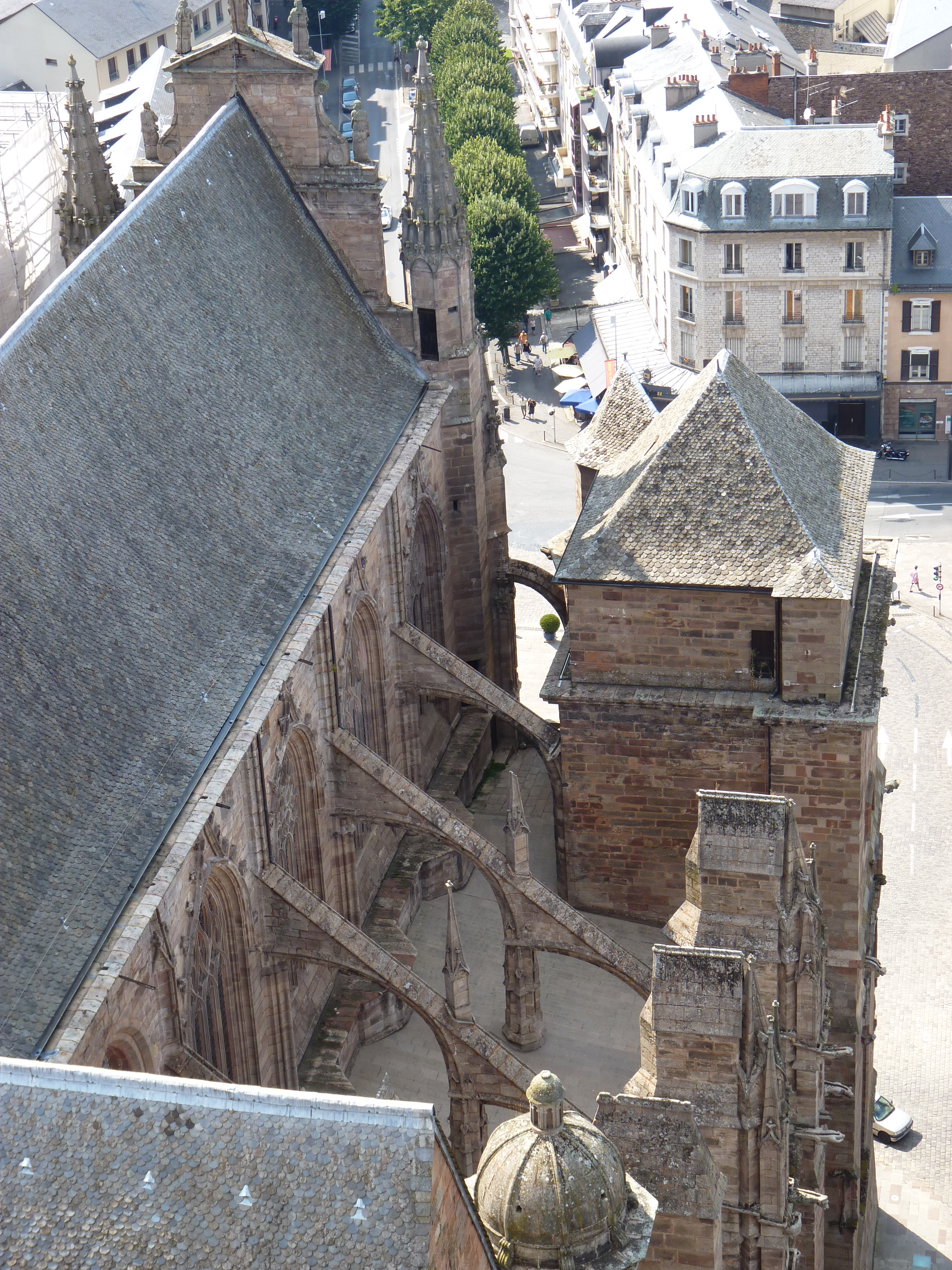

===== Episcopal Palace =====
The Episcopal Palace of Rodez was made a Historic Monument in 1942.

The old episcopal palace of the 15th century, lay between the transept of the present cathedral and the rampart of the city. Paul-Louis-Philippe de Lezay de Lusignan was appointed Bishop of Rodez in 1684. He began the construction of the current palace upon his arrival, which ended in 1694. The palace was built in the Louis XIII style with a staircase reminiscent of the Château de Fontainebleau.

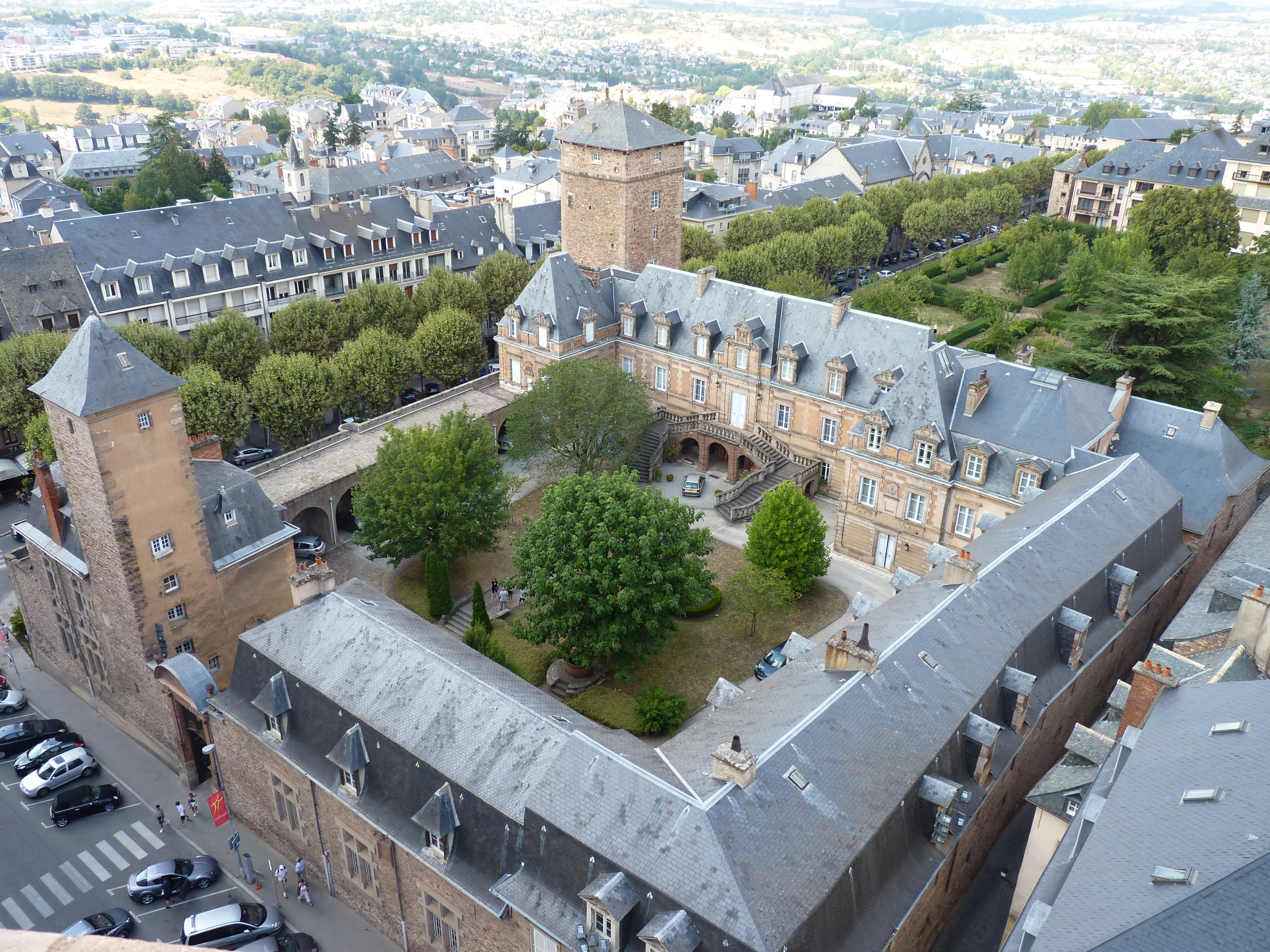

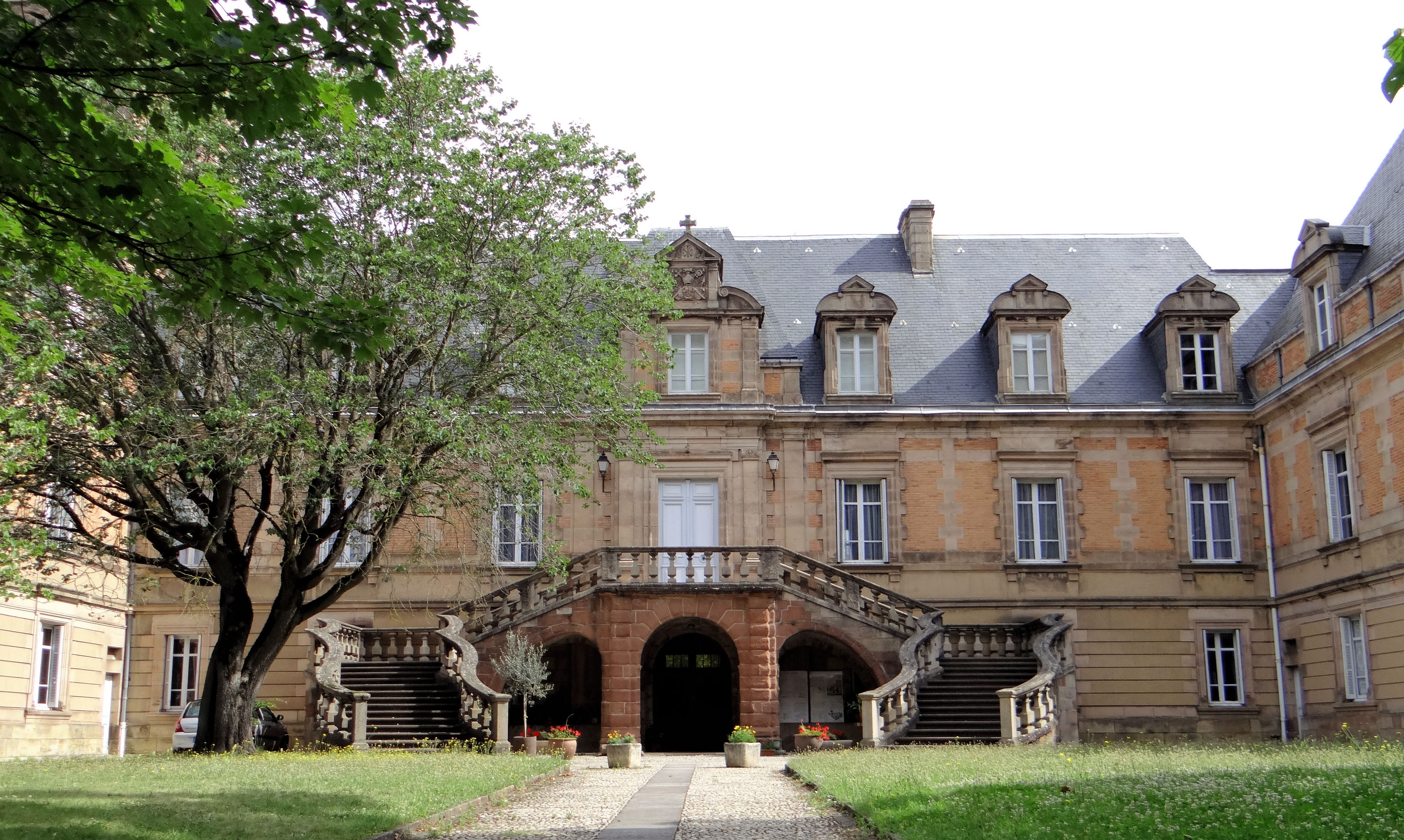

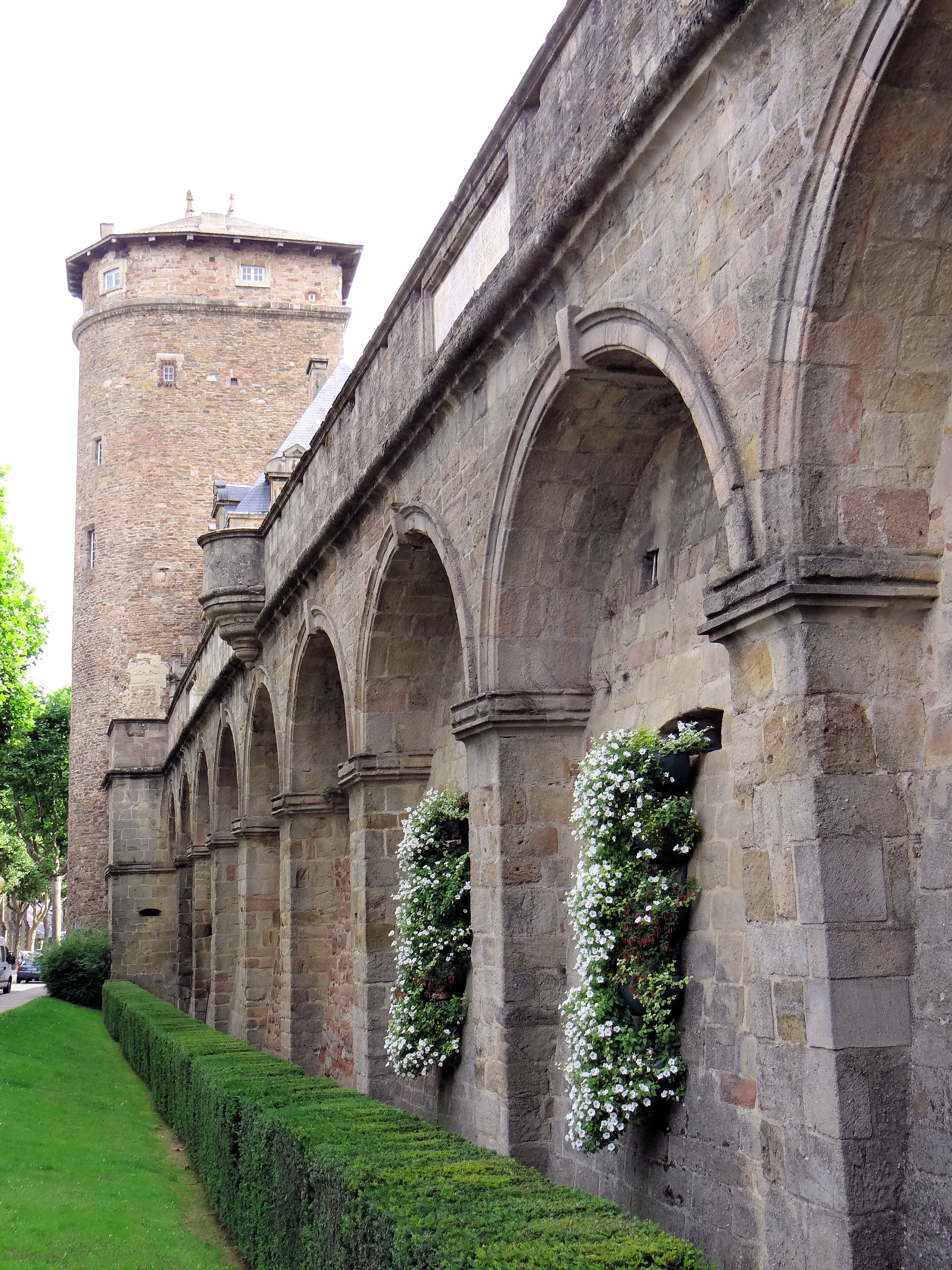

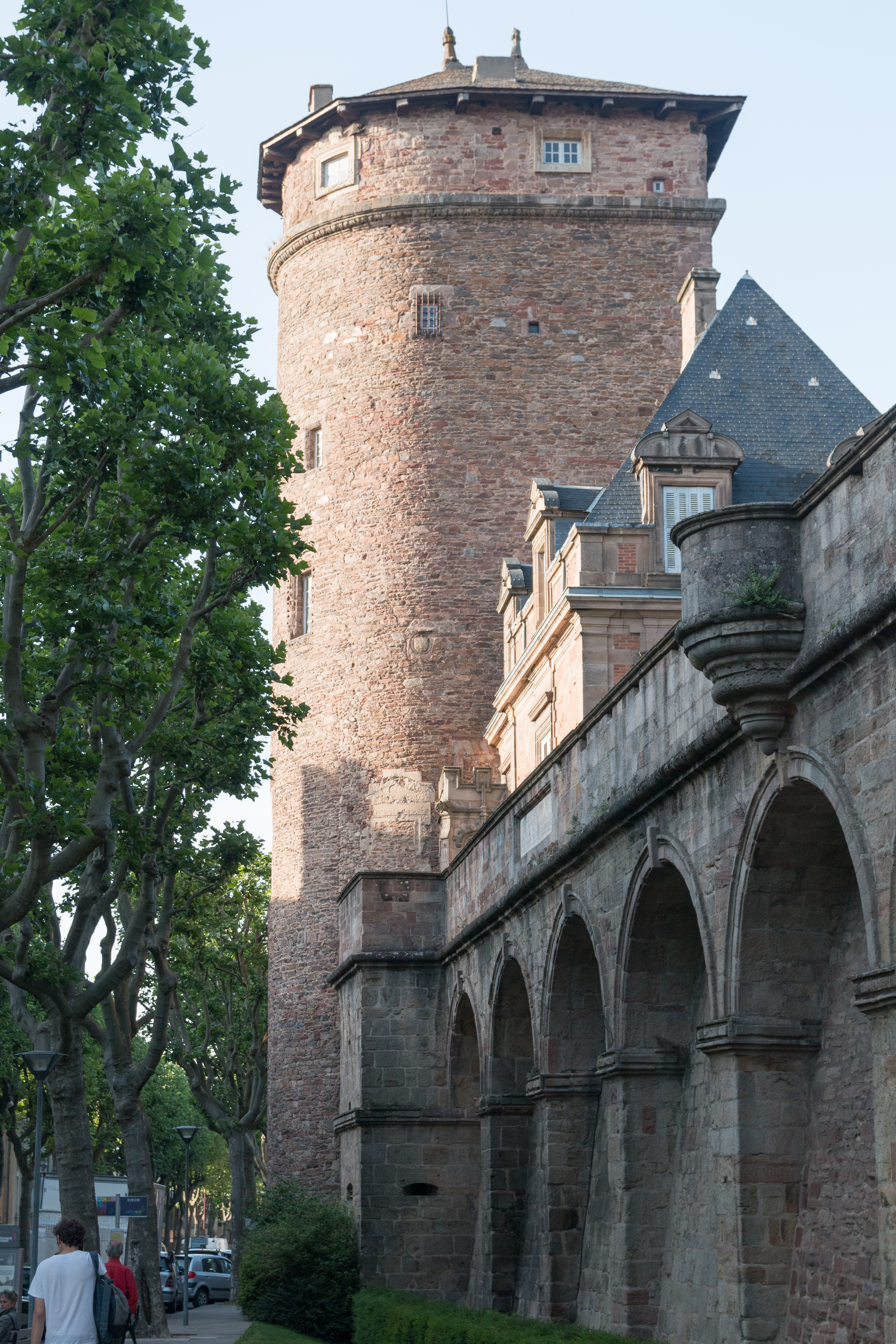

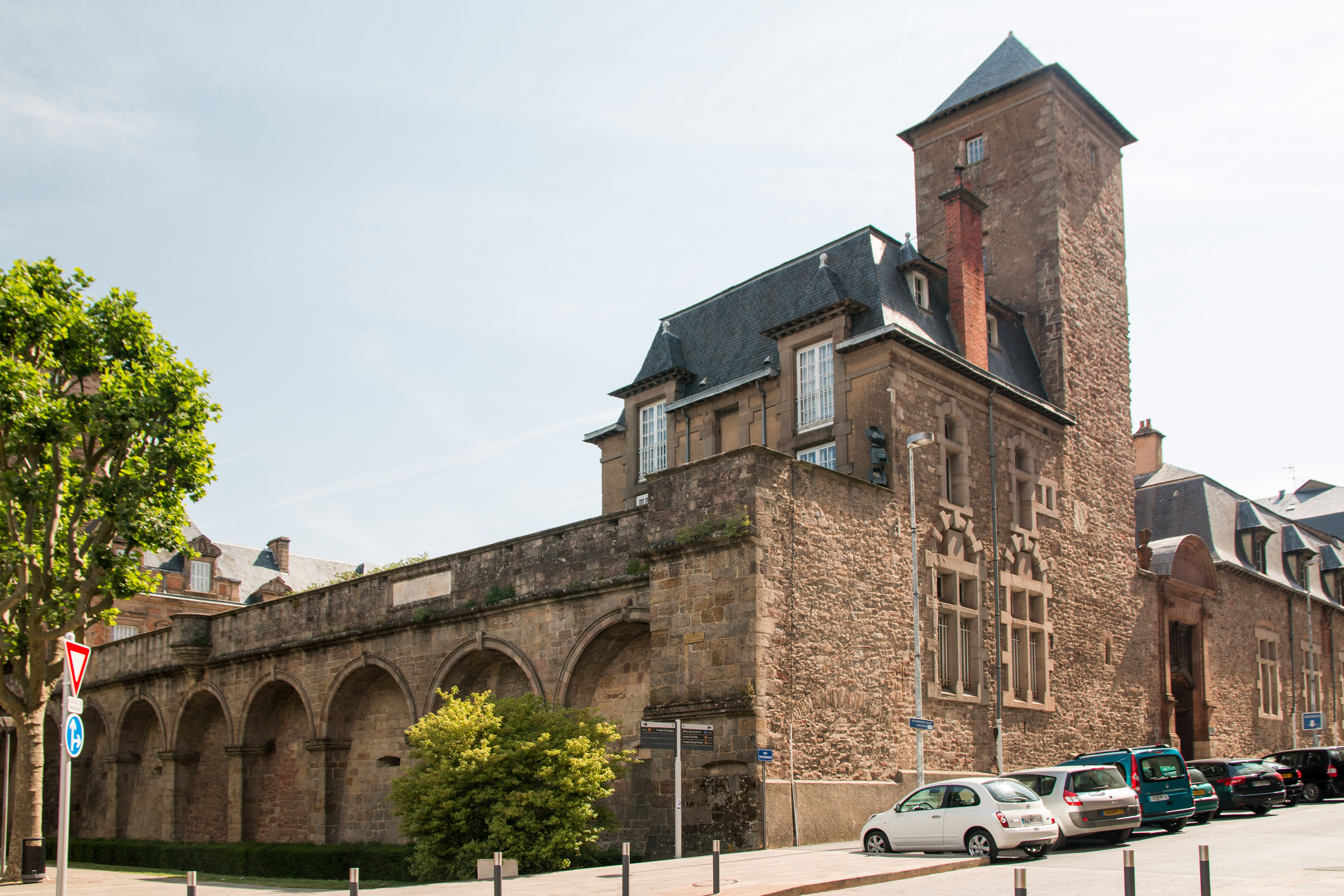

===== Presbytery =====
Made a Historic Monument in 1950.

===== Saint-Amans Church =====
The Church of Saint Amans was made a Historic Monument in 1943. It was built in the 12th century and then completely rebuilt from 1758 to 1761 with materials salvaged from the original building. The exterior is Baroque but the interior has maintained its Romanesque style. The dome was decorated in the 18th century by Salinier. Tapestries of the 6th century decorate the choir and represent the miracles of Saint Amans. It retains a 15th-century Pietà and a statue of the Trinity (16th century), as well as a Limoges enamel reliquary casket.

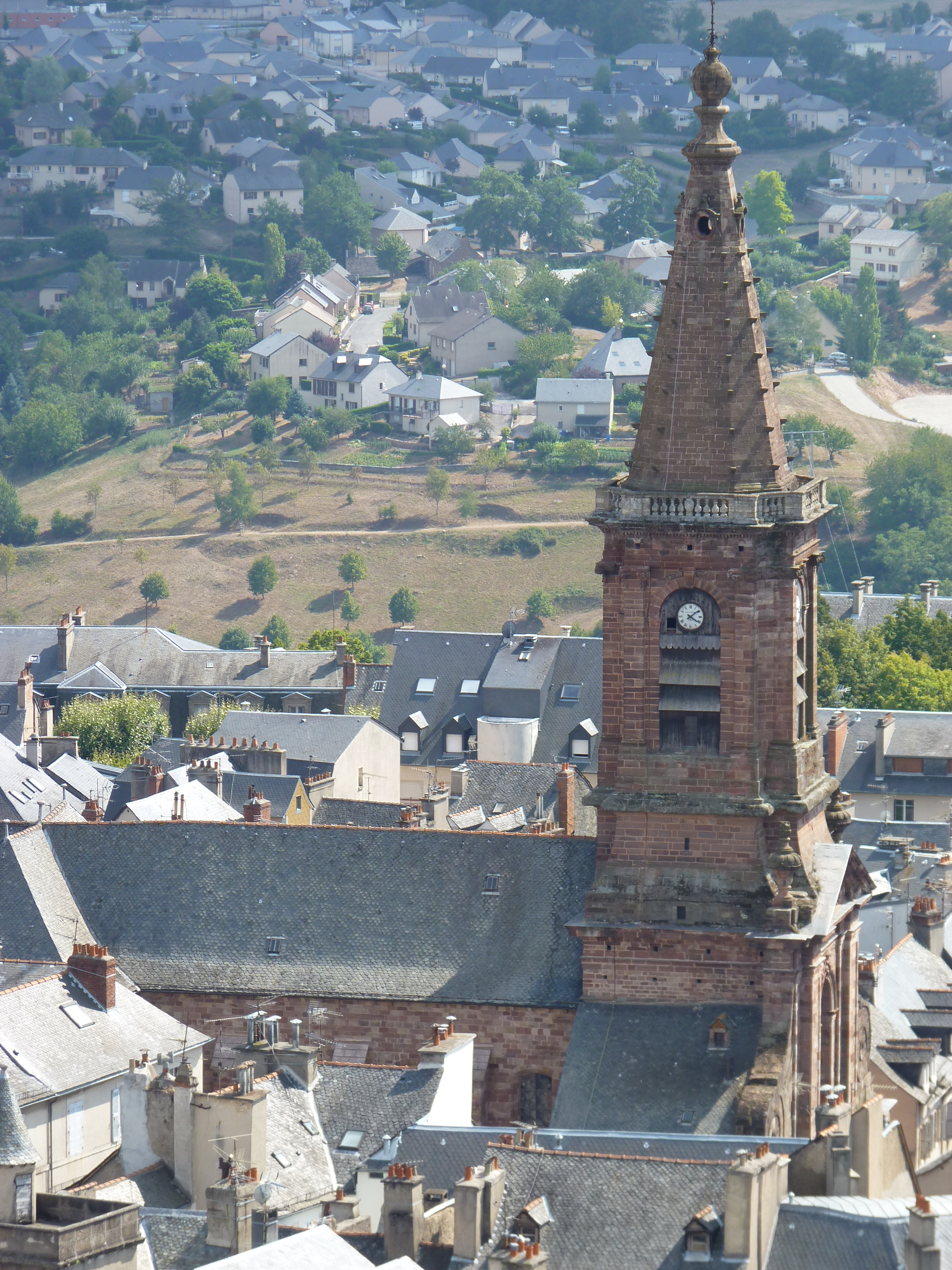

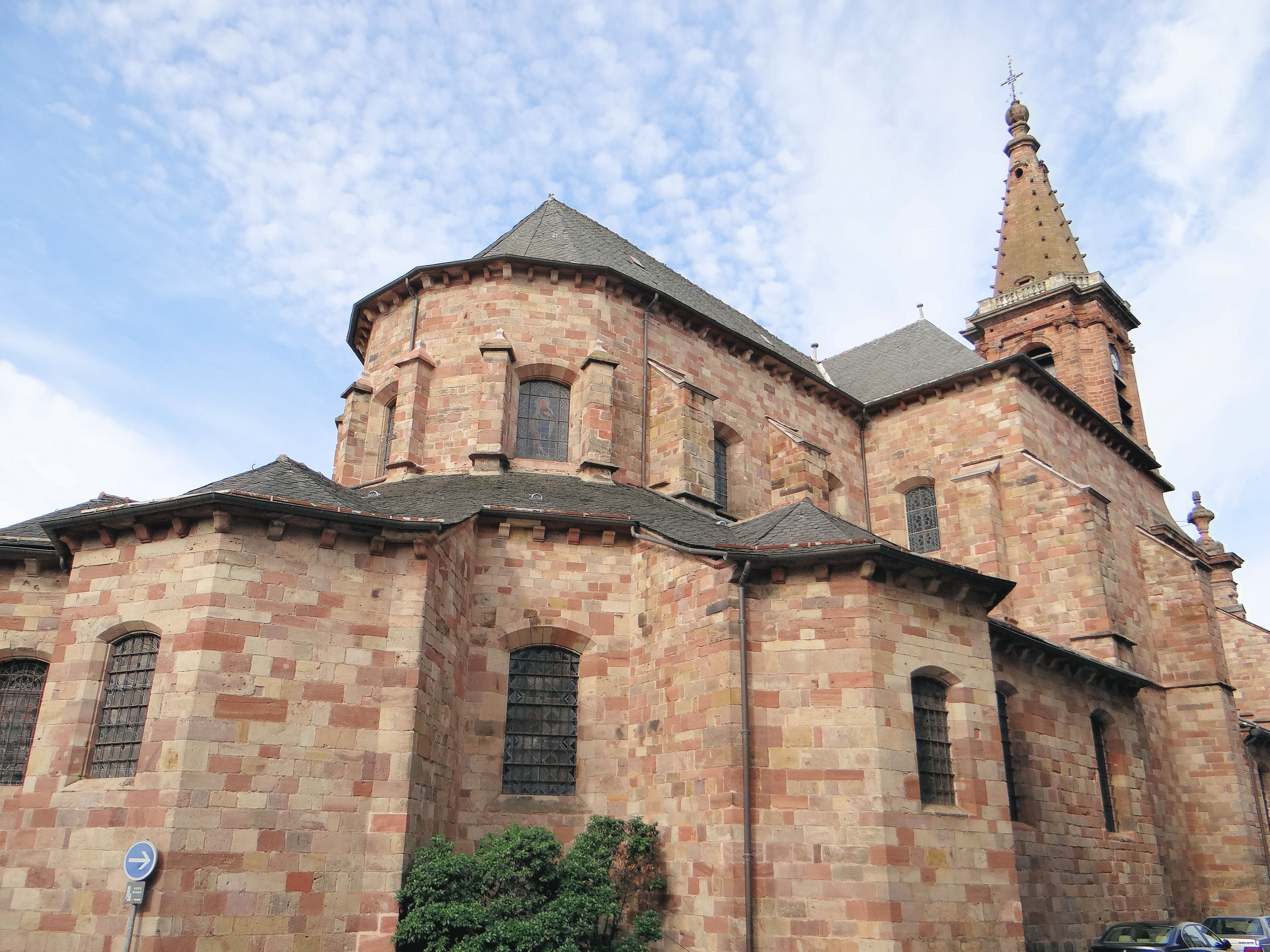

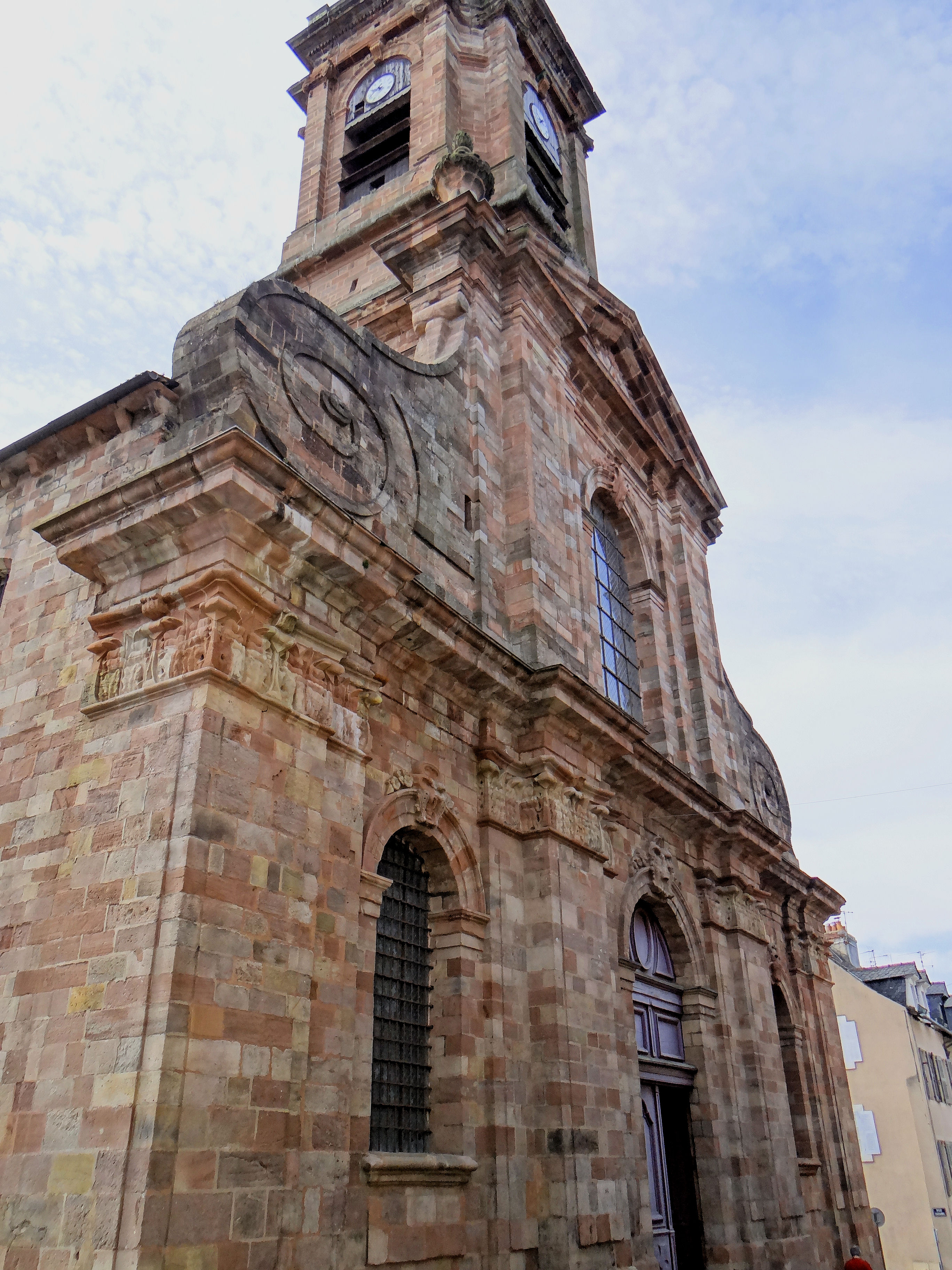

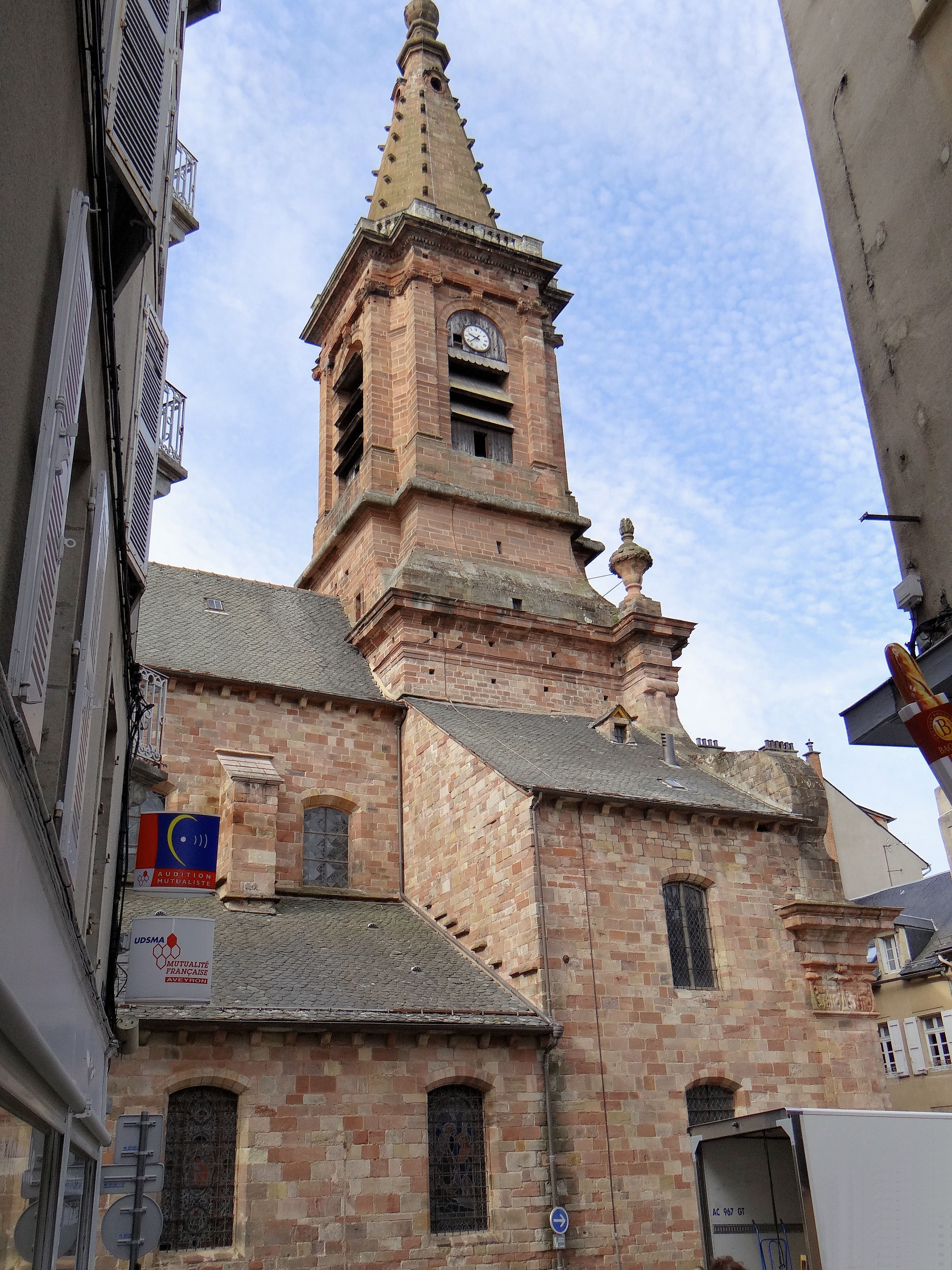

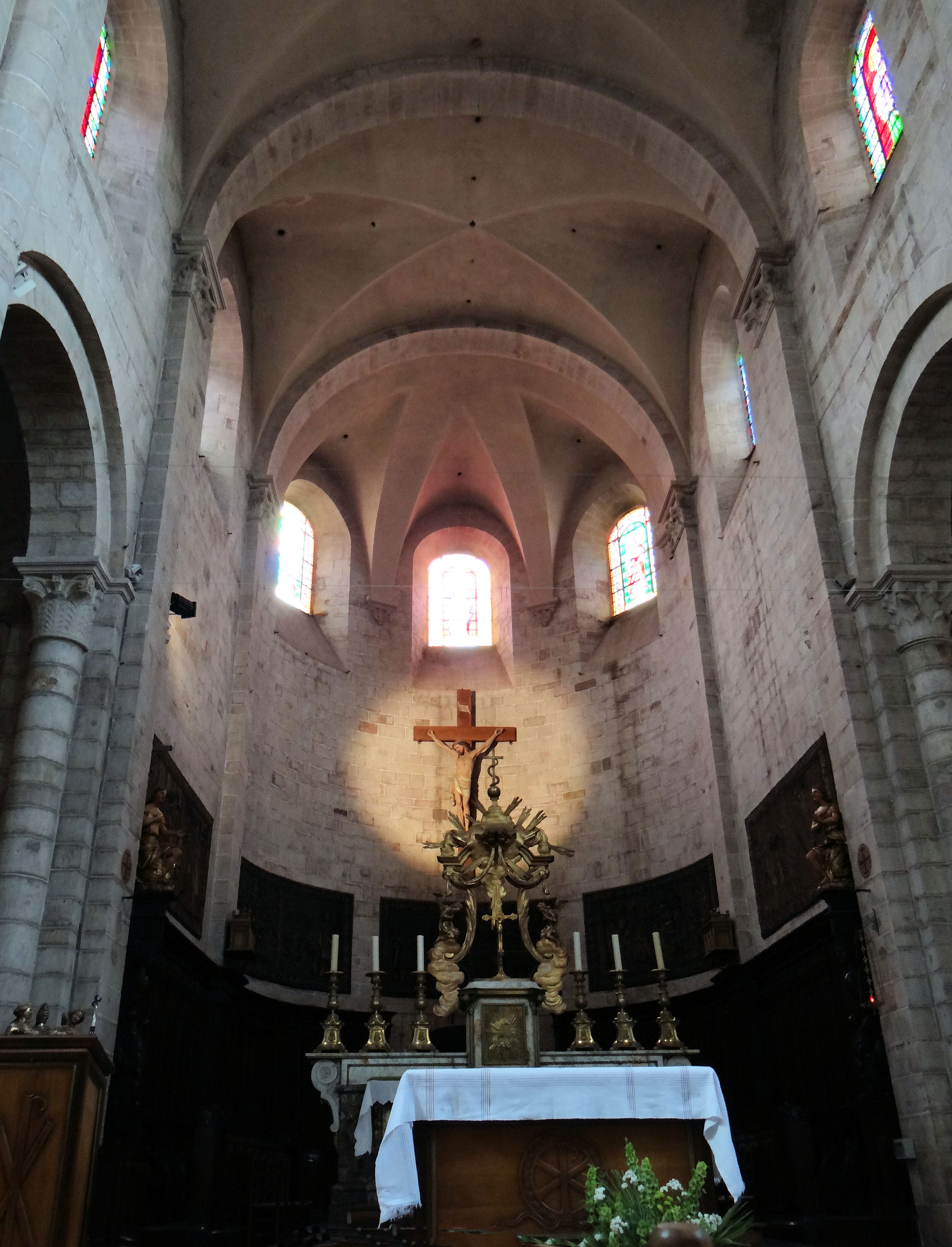

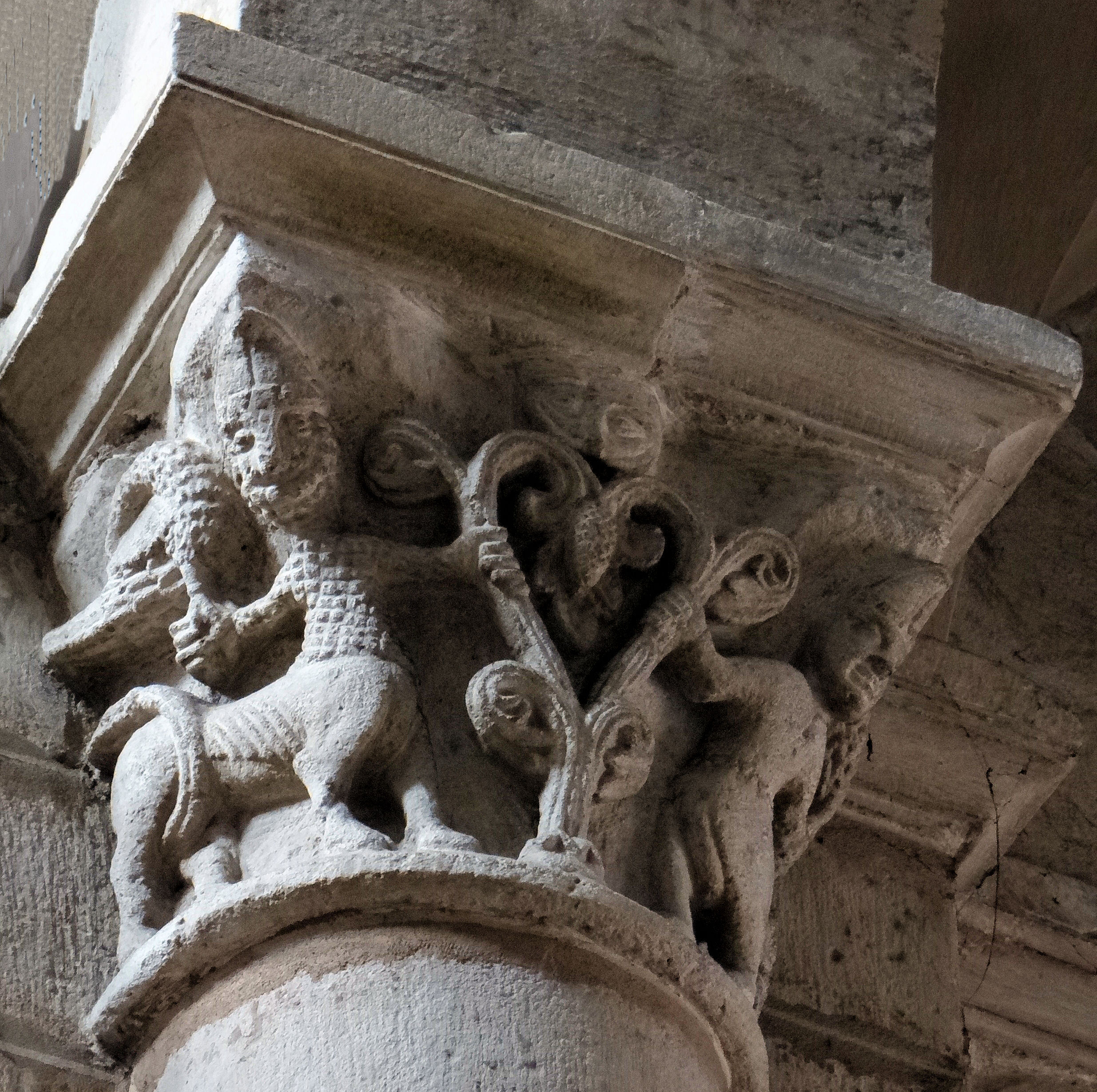

===== Sacré-Cœur Church =====
The Sacre-Coeur Church was made a Historic Monument in 2005. Its construction was inspired by the Abbey Church of Saint Foy in Conques with notable influences from major Périgord churches.

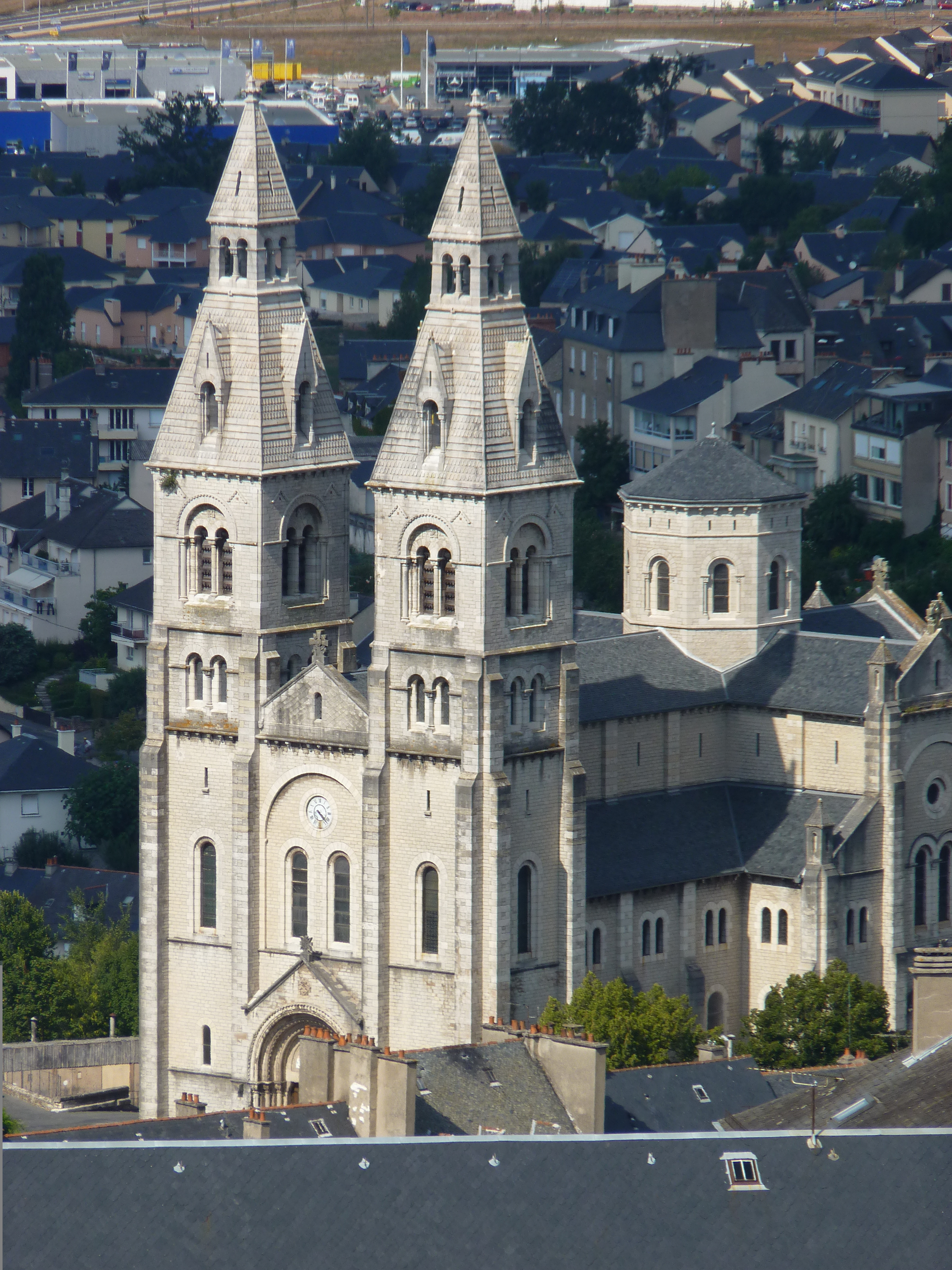

===== Chapel of the former Jesuit college =====
Made a Historic Monument in 1927.

The former Jesuit college is a group of historic buildings constituting the Lycée Foch. This college remains a chapel, a building and a fountain, the fountain of Vors of Denys Puech, placed against the exterior wall of the chapel, in Place Foch.

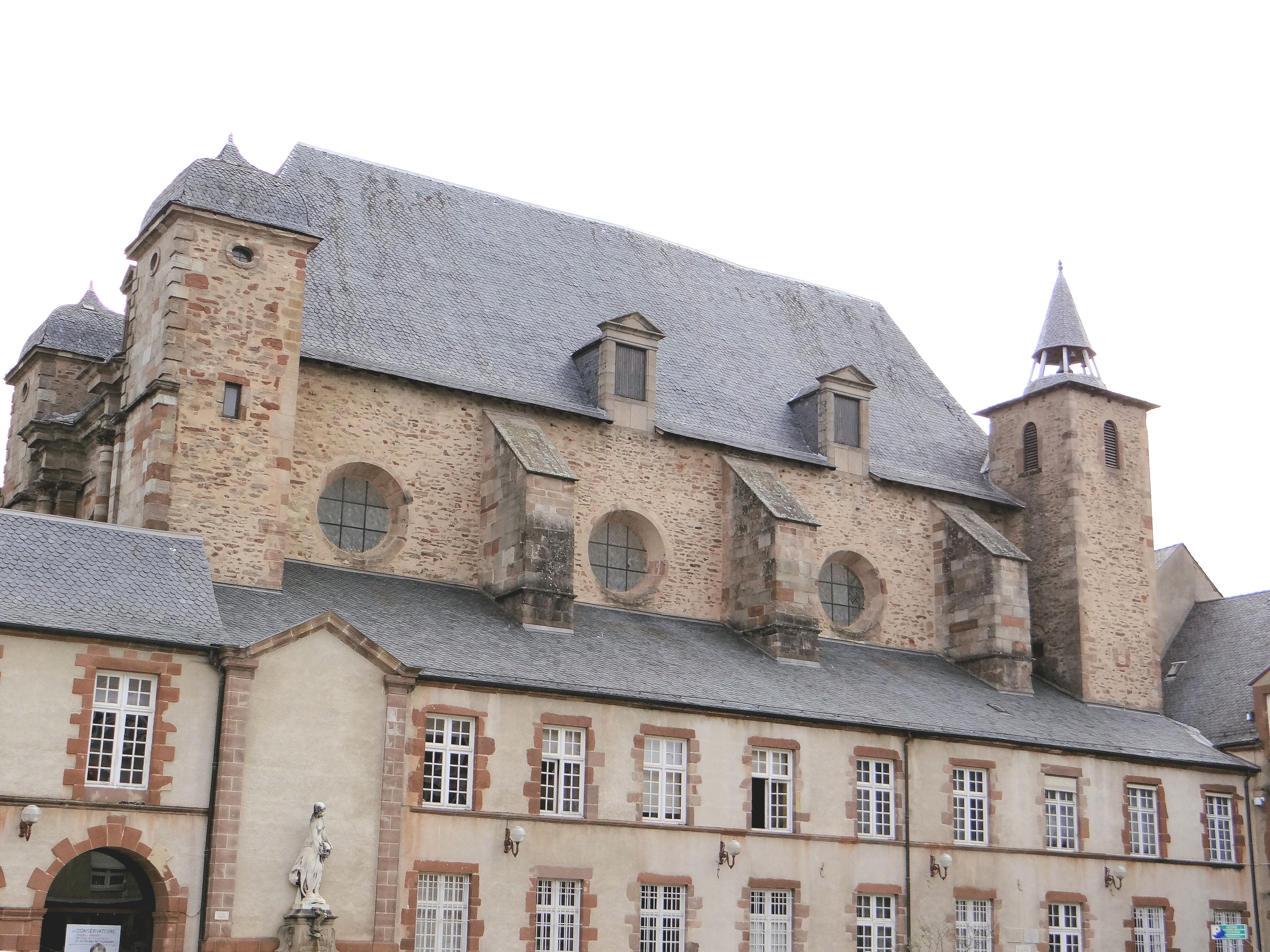

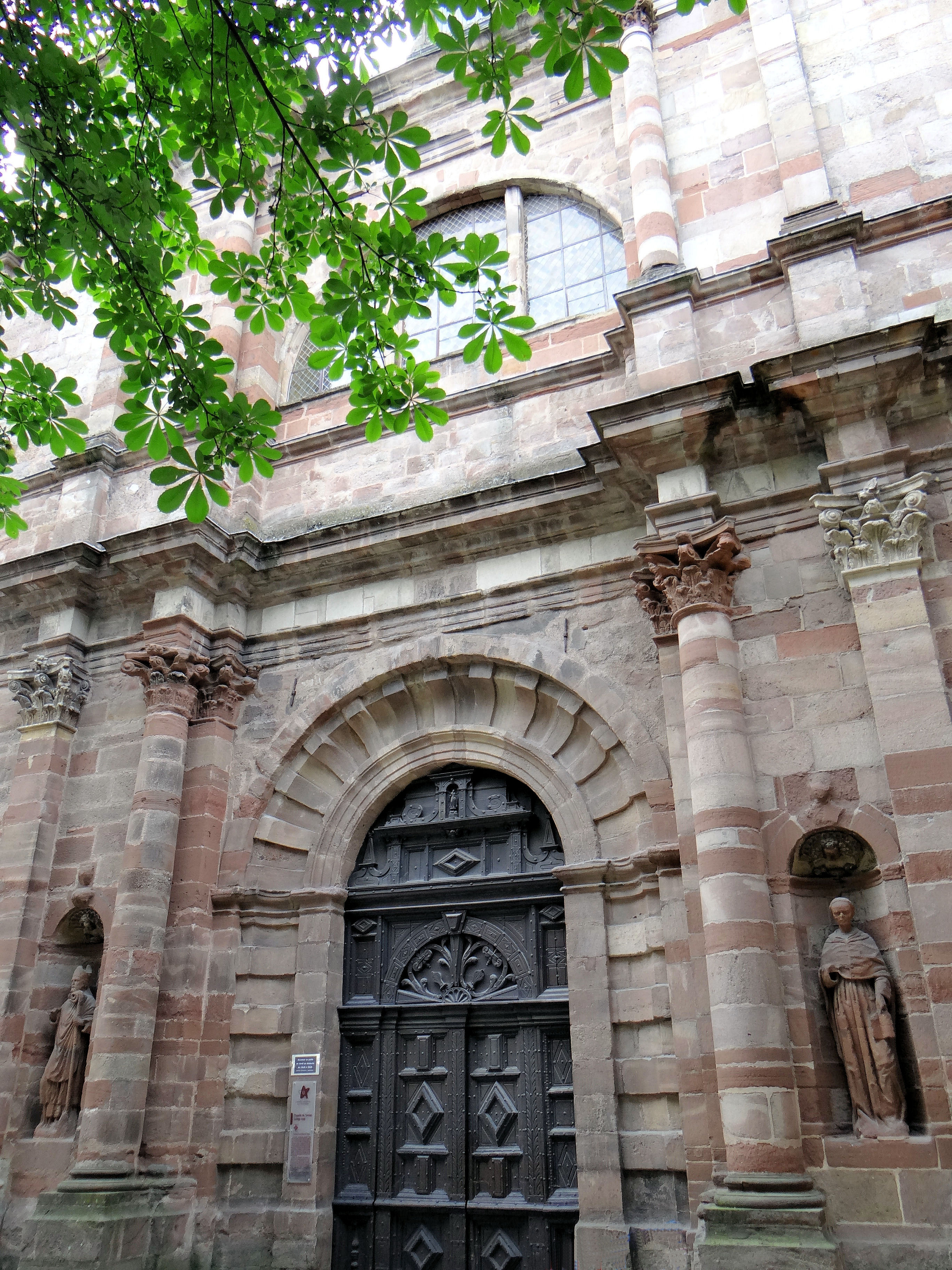

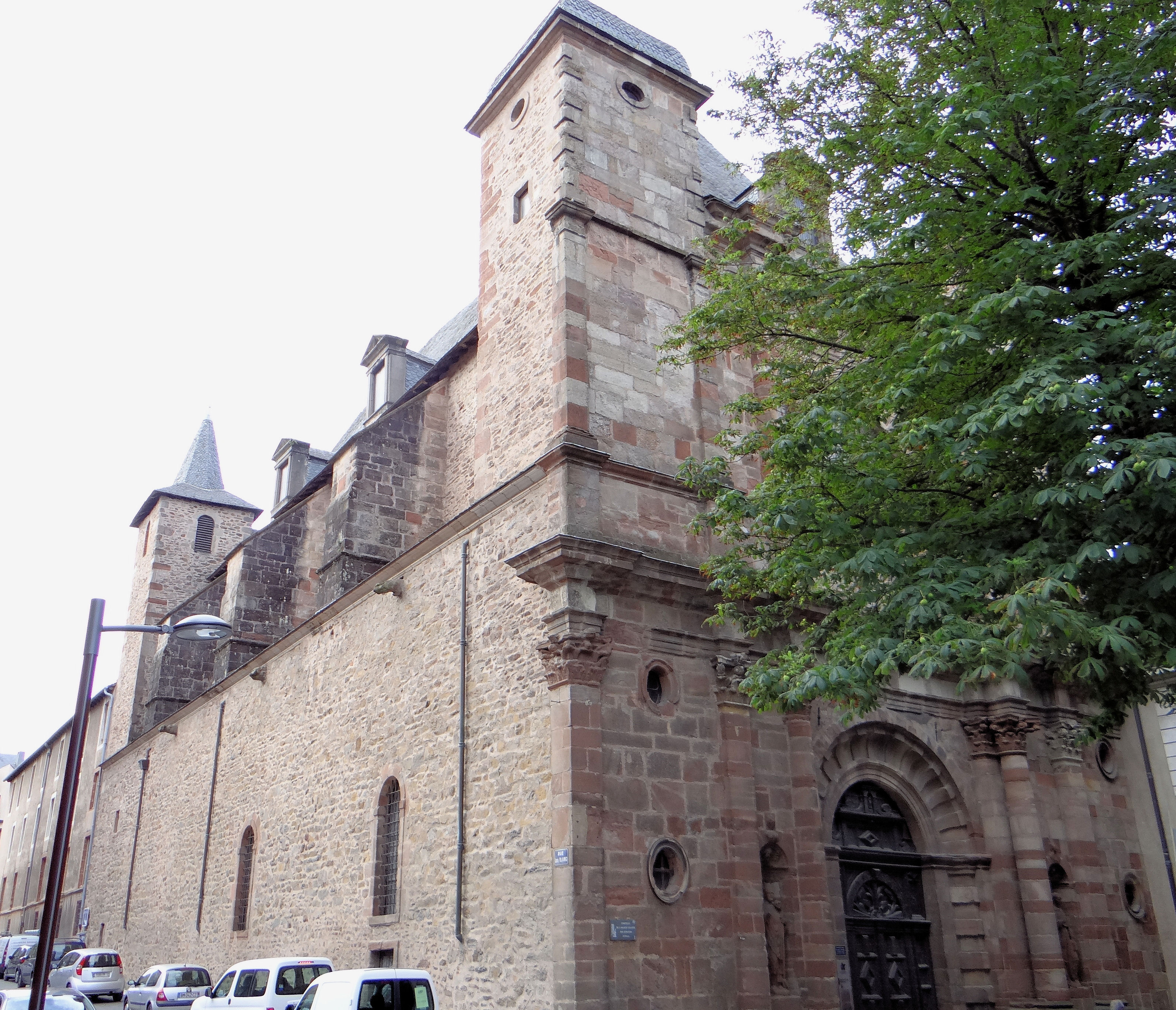

===== Ancient monastery =====
Made a Historic Monument in 1942.

The national stud is now installed in this former religious building.

===== Others =====
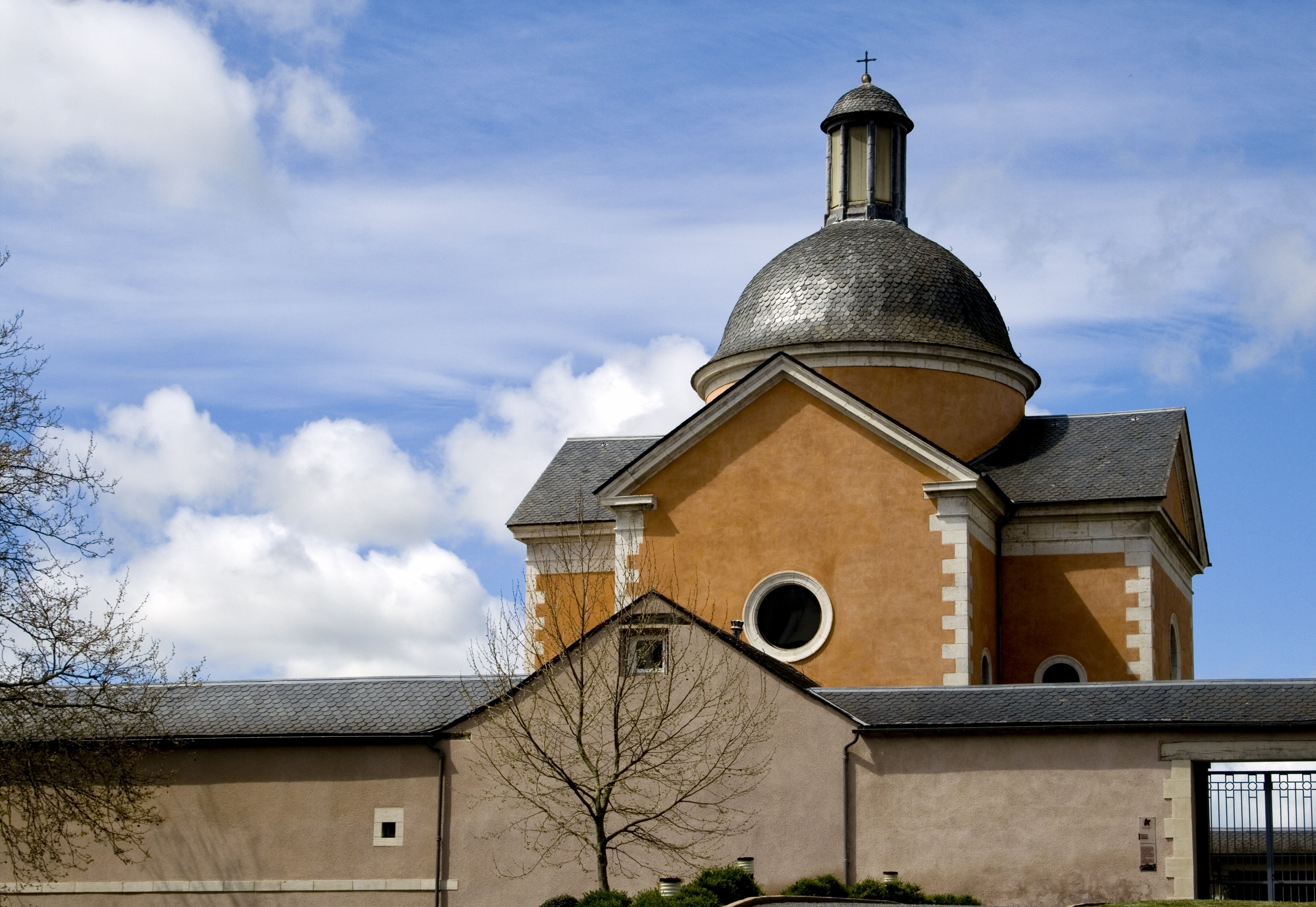
The Paraire Chapel in Rodez (April 2008)

- The Paraire Chapel, last vestige of the asylum for the insane, where the Paraire writer and poet Antonin Artaud was confined. Today, it houses a 'space Antonin Artaud'.
- The chapel of Saint-Martin, it was situated halfway up, overlooking Layoule. Before 1789, it served as a Ruthenoise parish, and then before the second world war, deposit garbage and playgrounds for children. In ruins since the war, it was entirely demolished in 1966.
- The Chapel of Our Lady of Mercy, located on the Chemin de la Boriette (a remote green space). Owned by the municipality of Rodez, it was originally incorporated into La Chartreuse (today the Haras national de Rodez). Restored by the Companions of the Duty, it is open to the public in the afternoon on good days.
- The Rodez mosque, inaugurated in May 2003 and remarkable for its architecture, is located on the Avenue Bamberg.

==== Civil buildings ====
===== Hôtel de la préfecture =====
Made a Historic Monument in 1947. The hotel was built in the first half of the 18th century by François Le Normant d'Ayssènes, counsellor to the king, and his receiver in the election of Rodez. It is now home to the prefecture of the Aveyron.

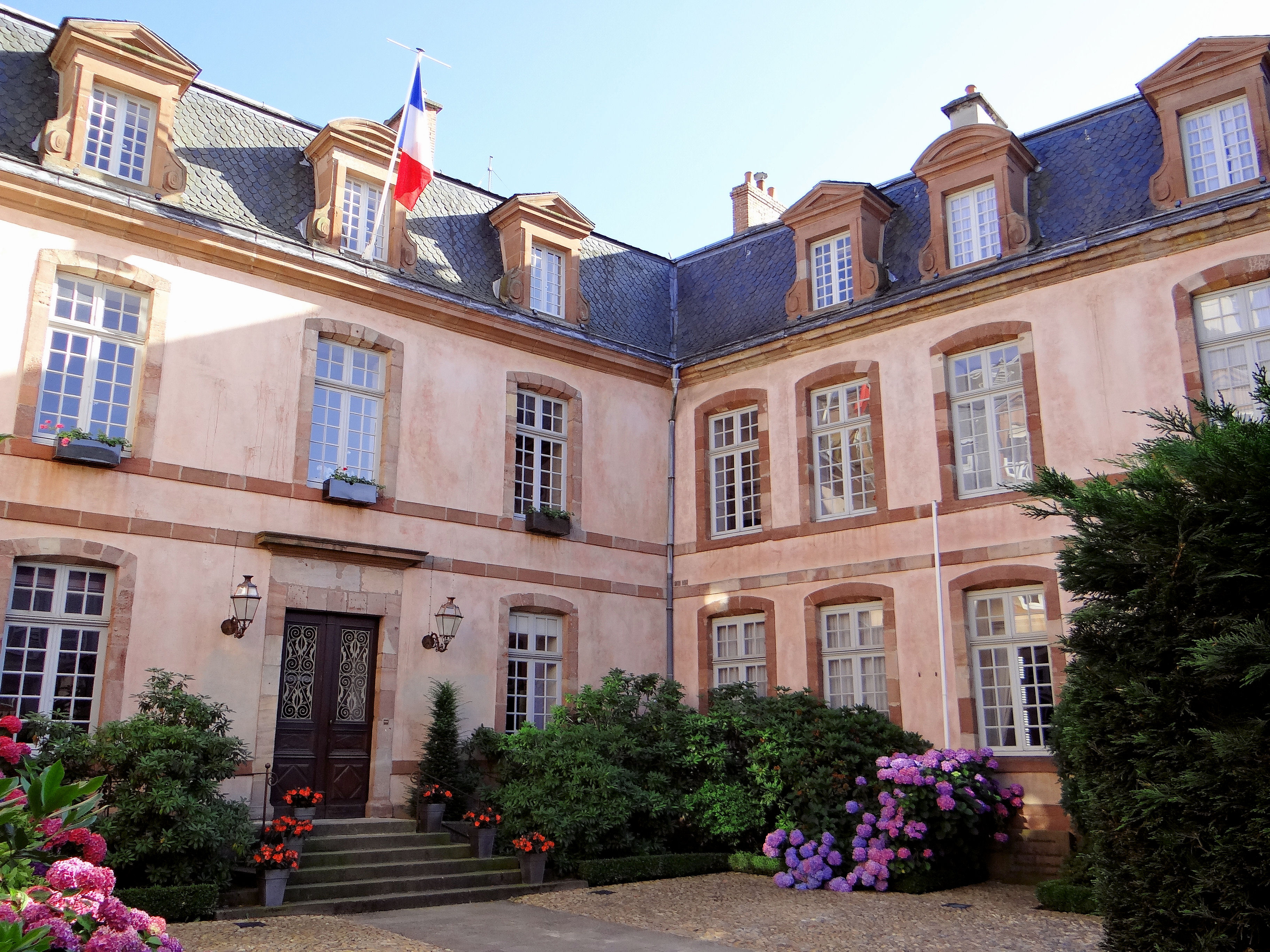

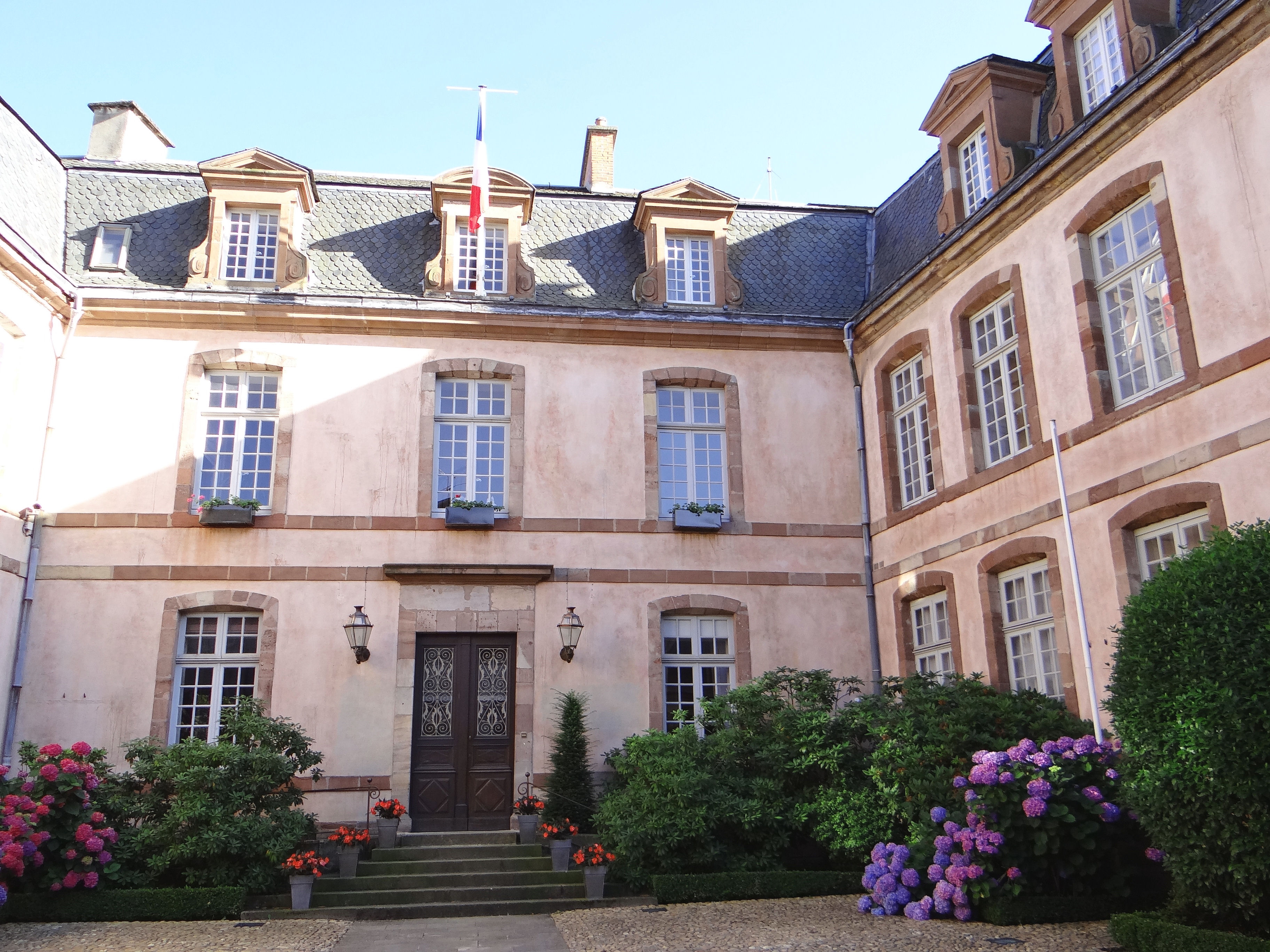

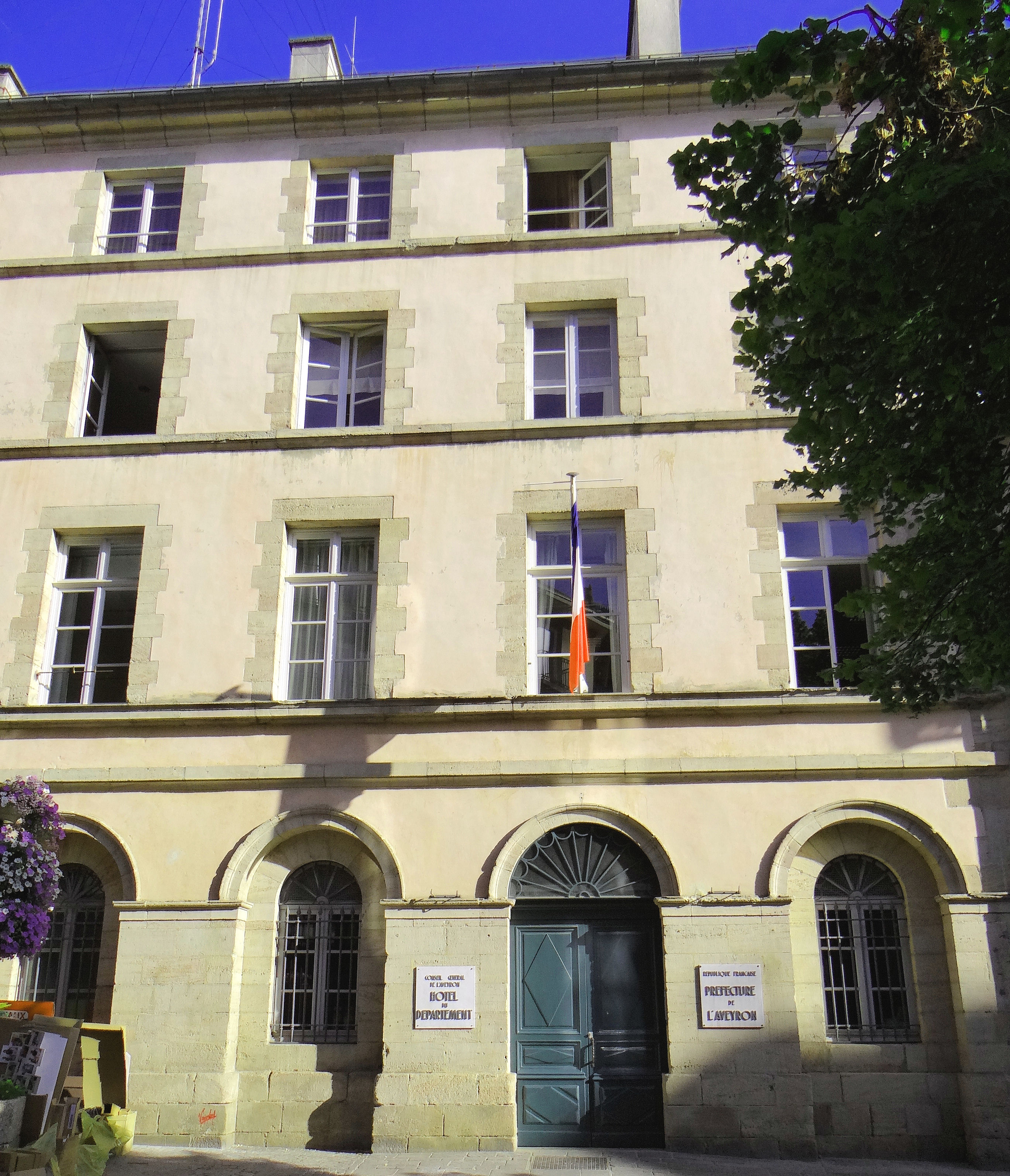

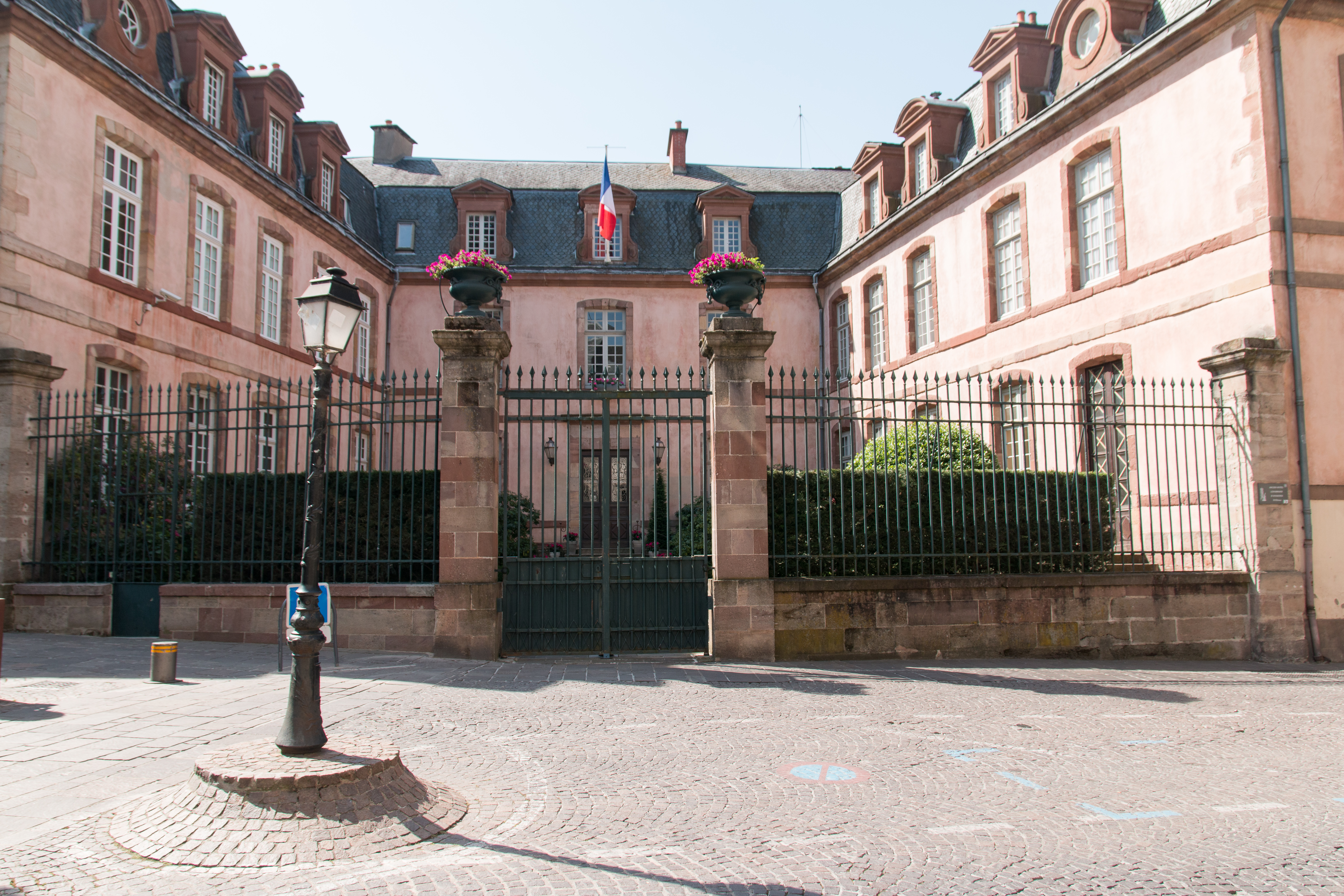

===== Hôtel de Bonald =====
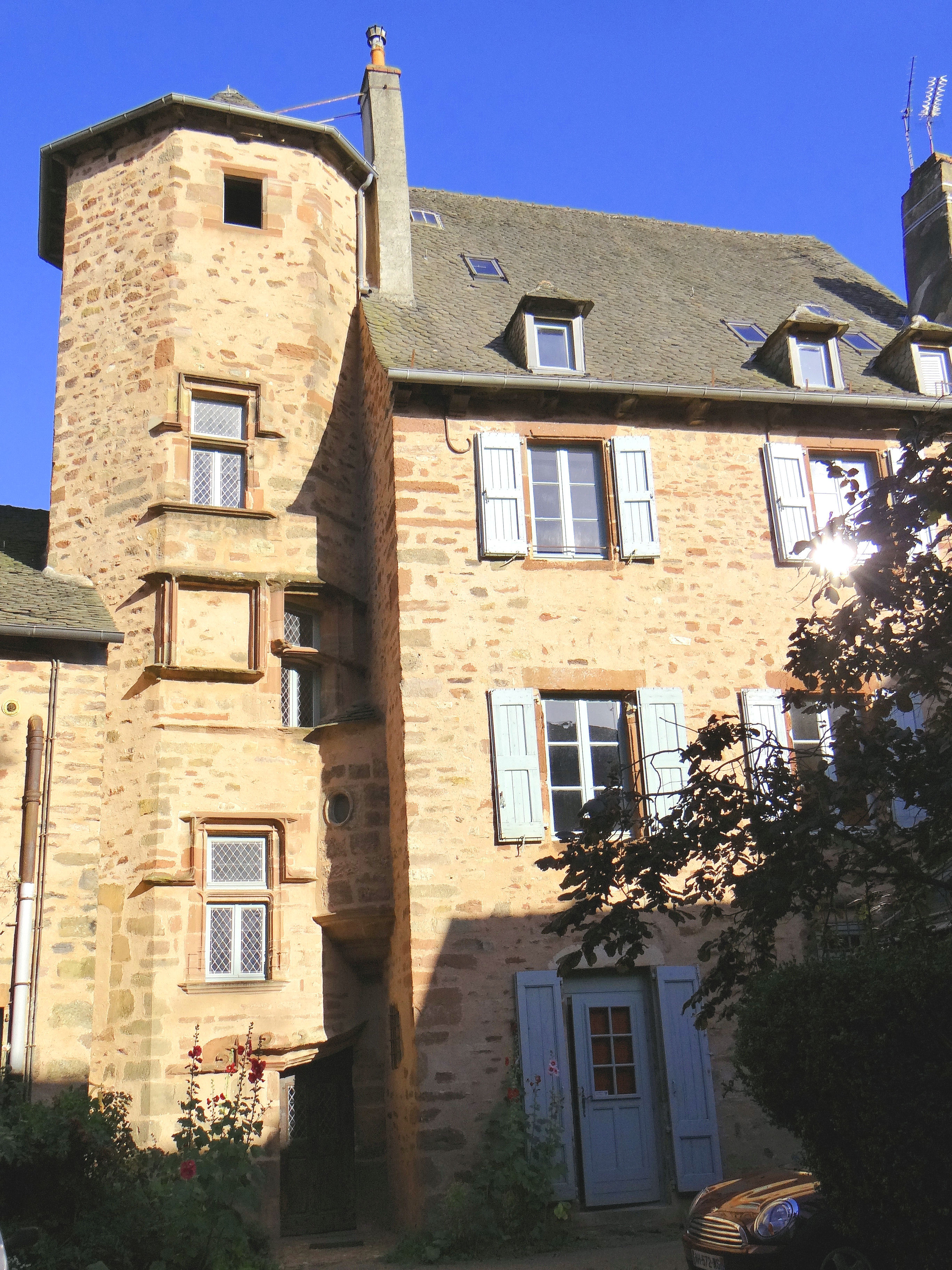
Hôtel de Bonald

Made an Historic Monument in 1991.

===== Hôtel du Cheval Noir =====
Made a Historic Monument in 1947.

===== Hôtel Séguret =====
Made a Historic Monument in 1944.

===== Maison d'Armagnac =====
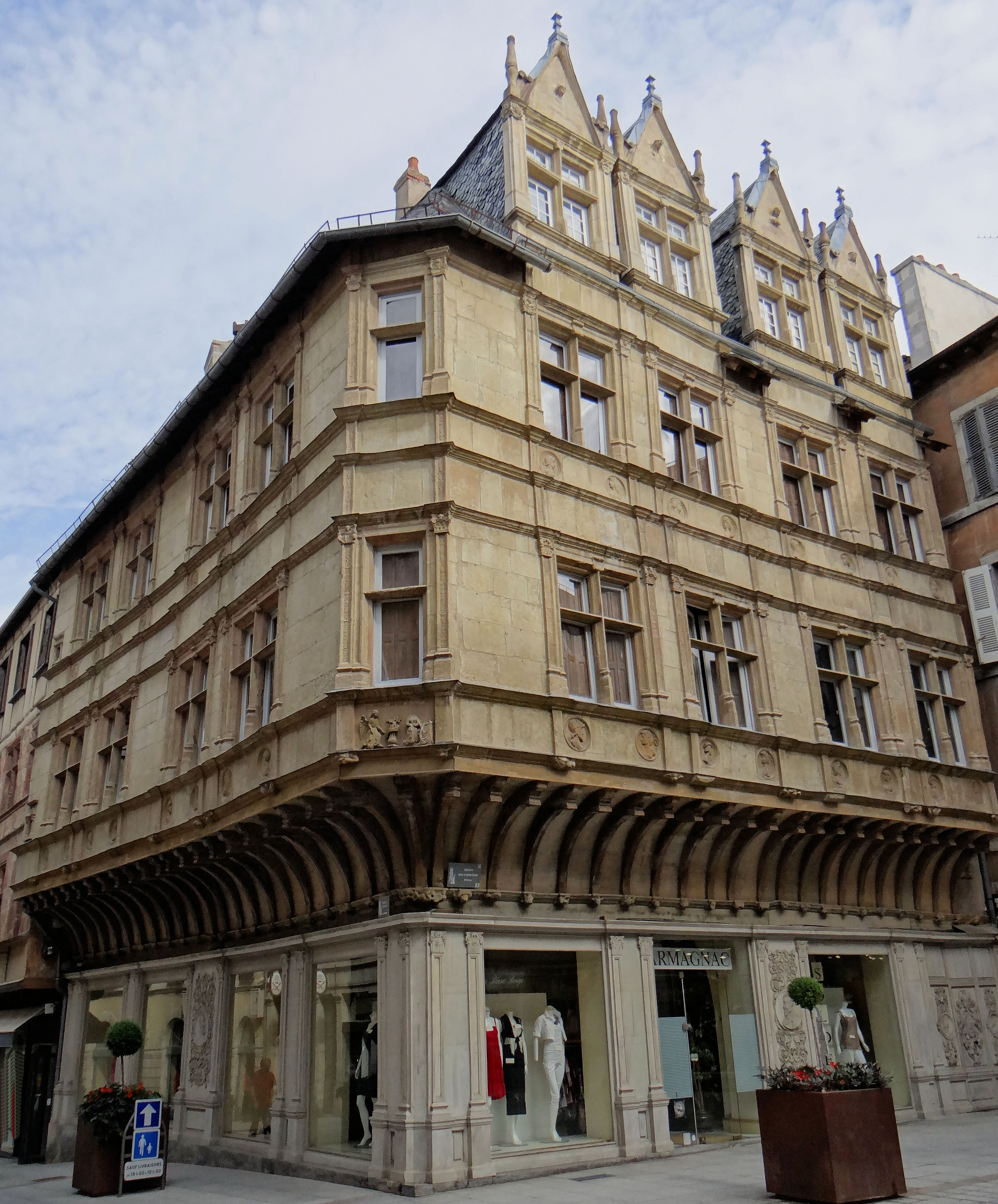
Maison d'Armagnac

Made a Historic Monument in 1862.

===== Maisons bourgeoises =====
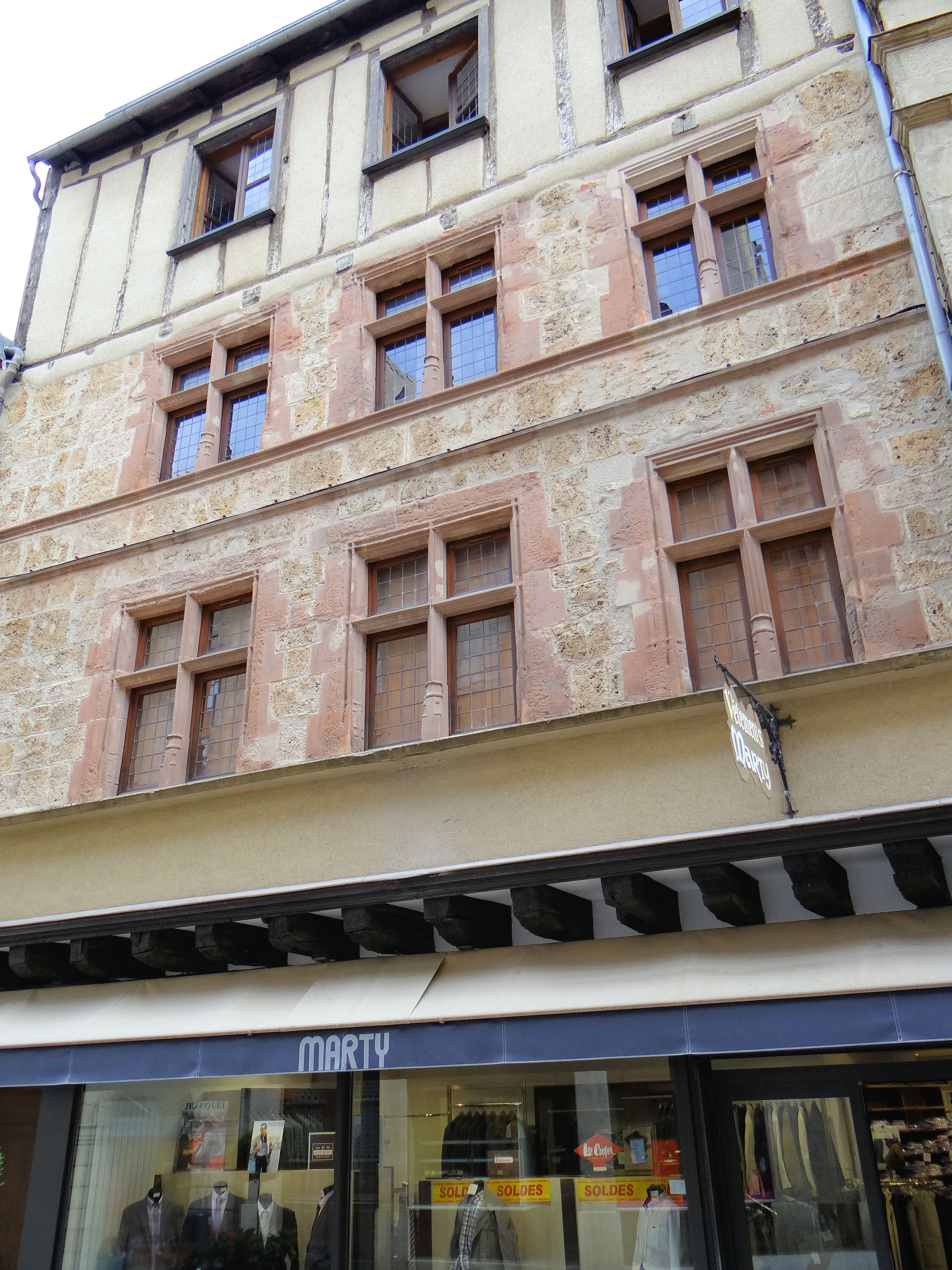

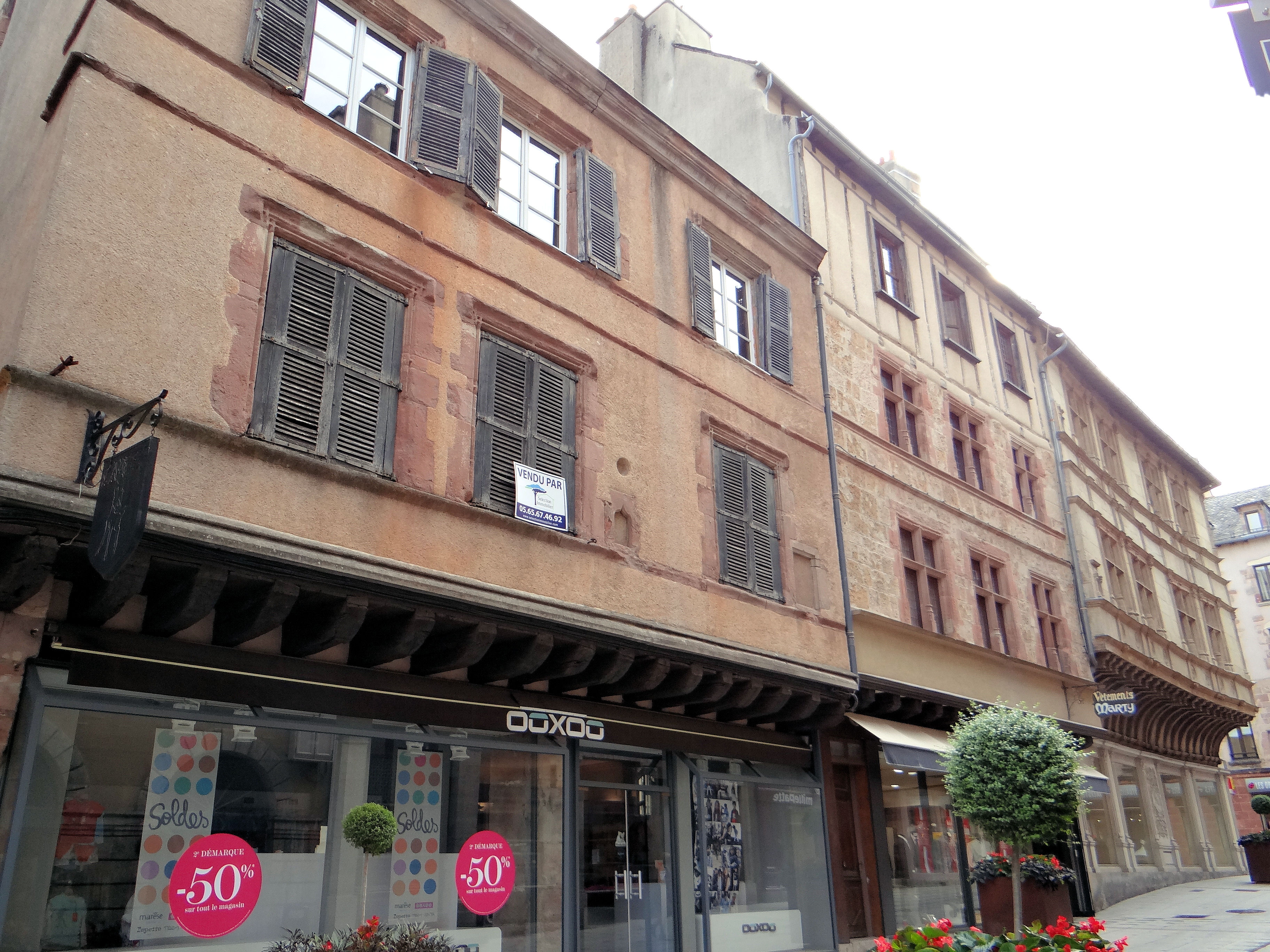

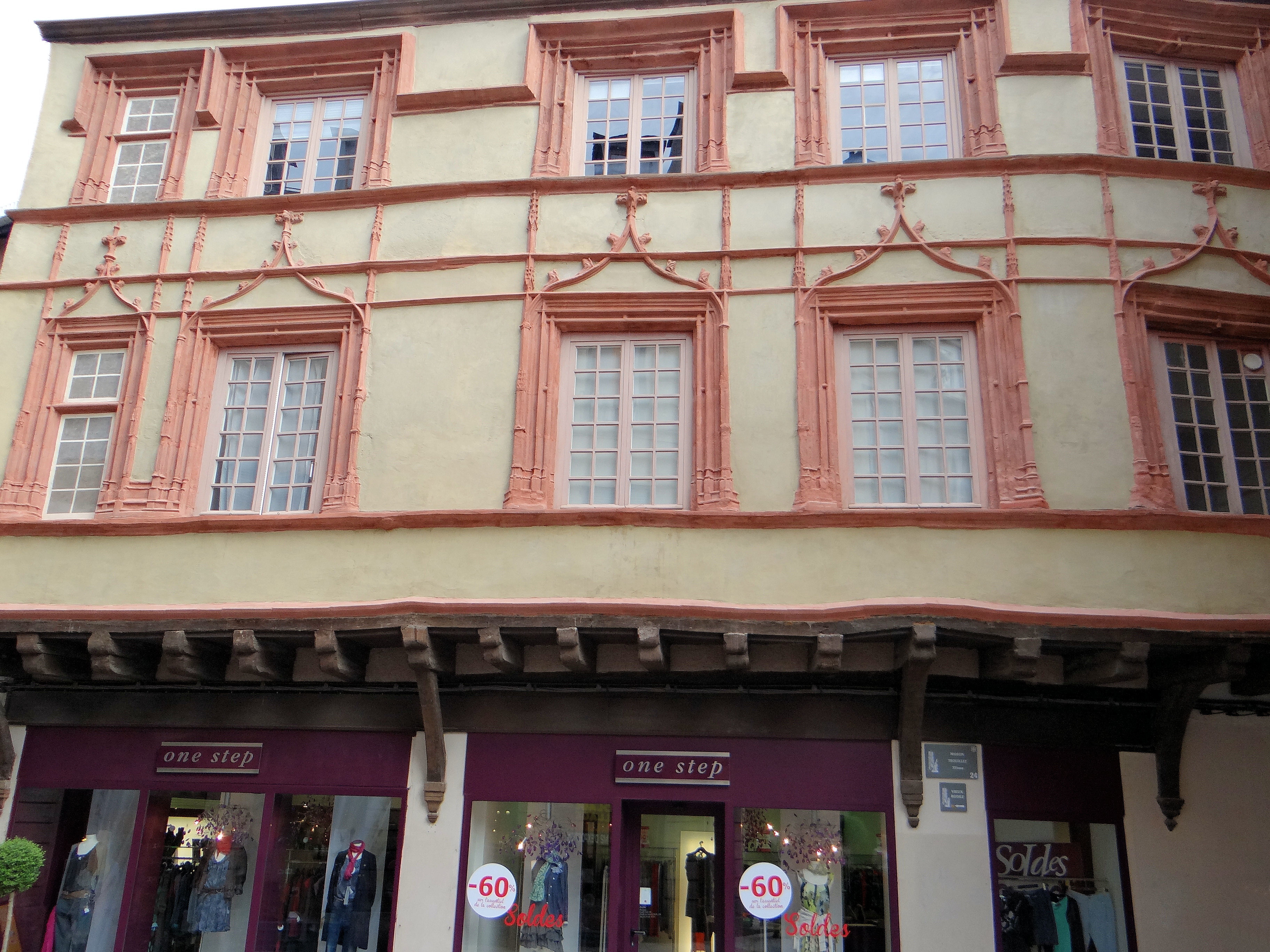

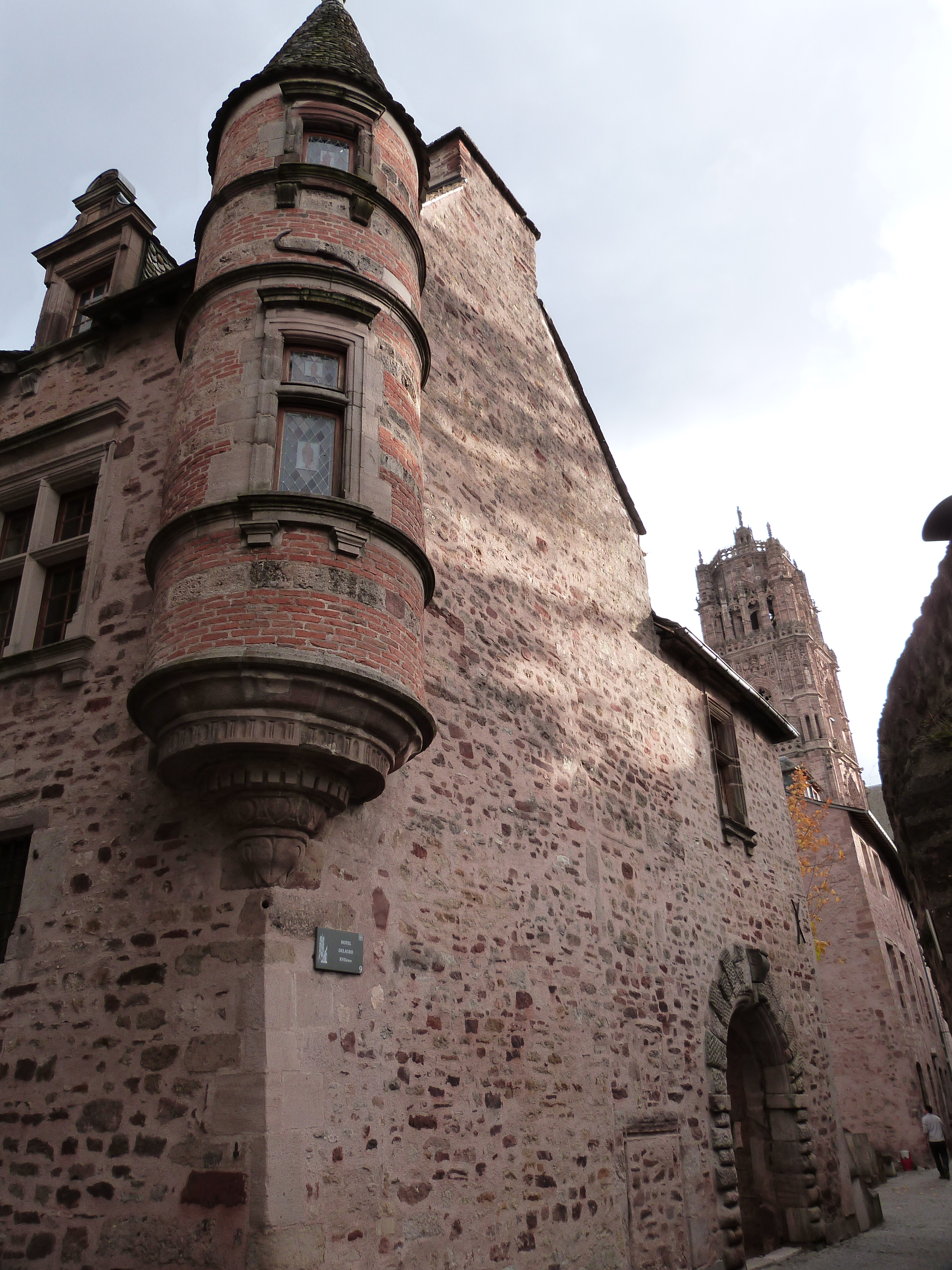

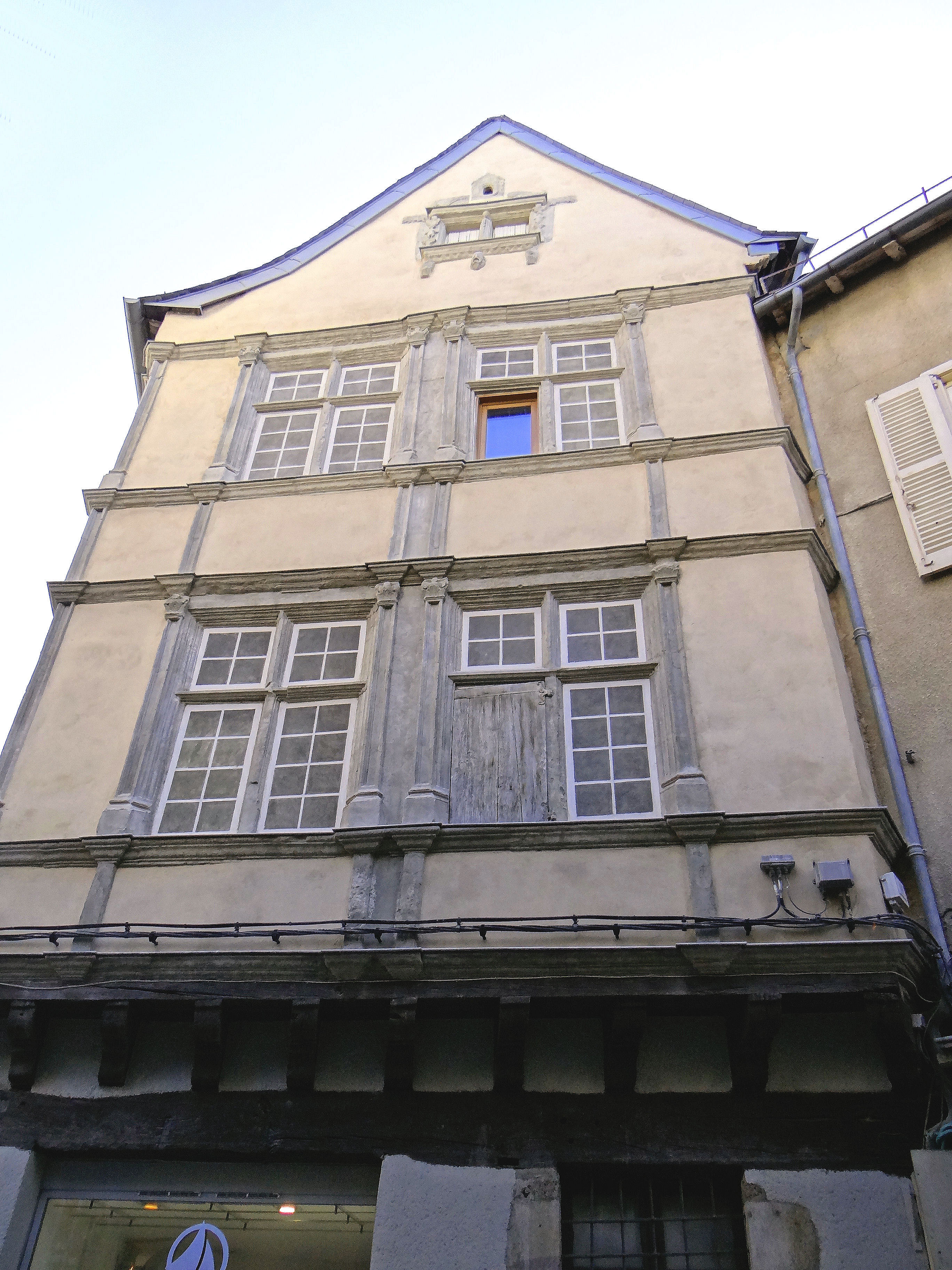

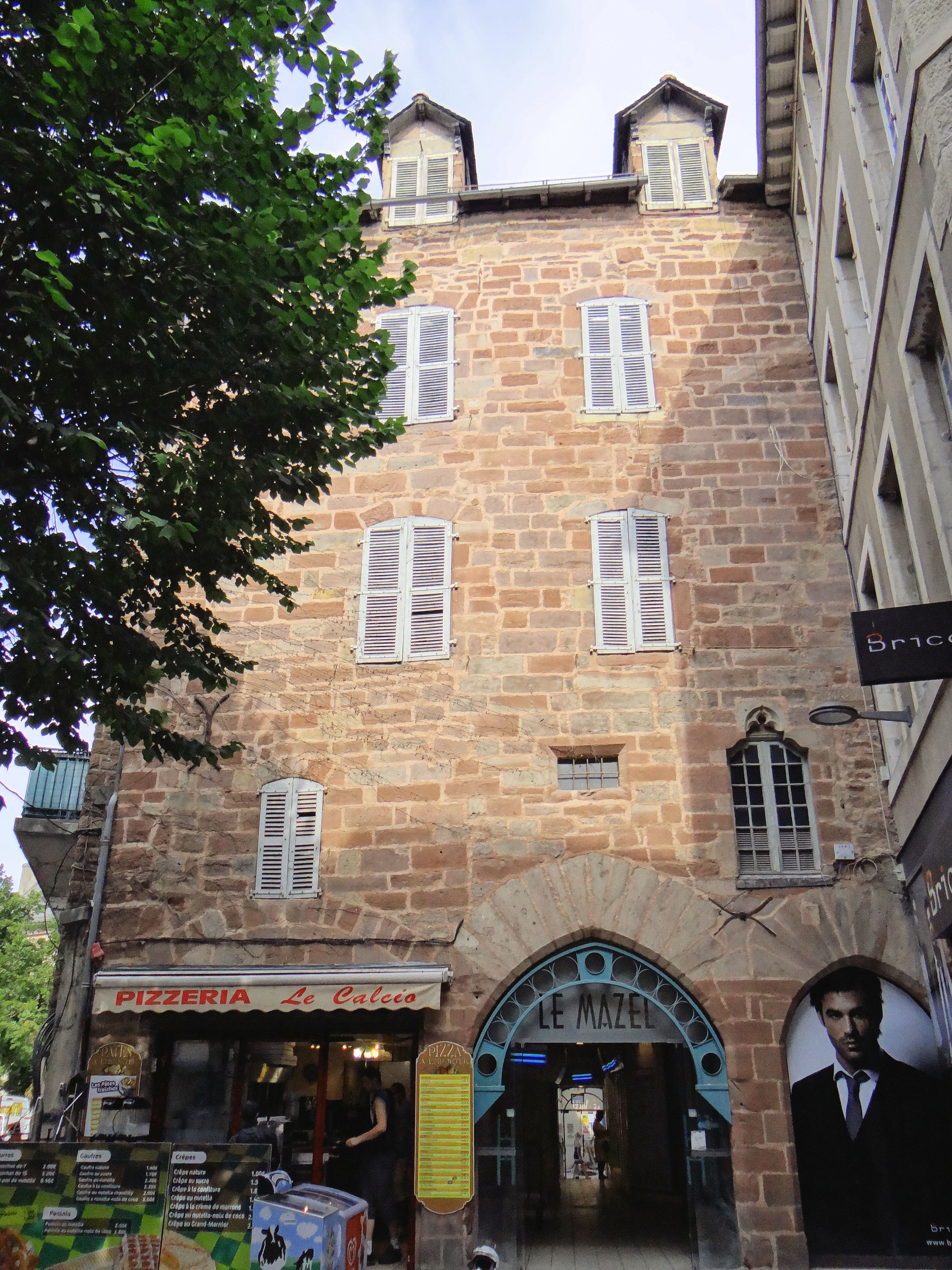
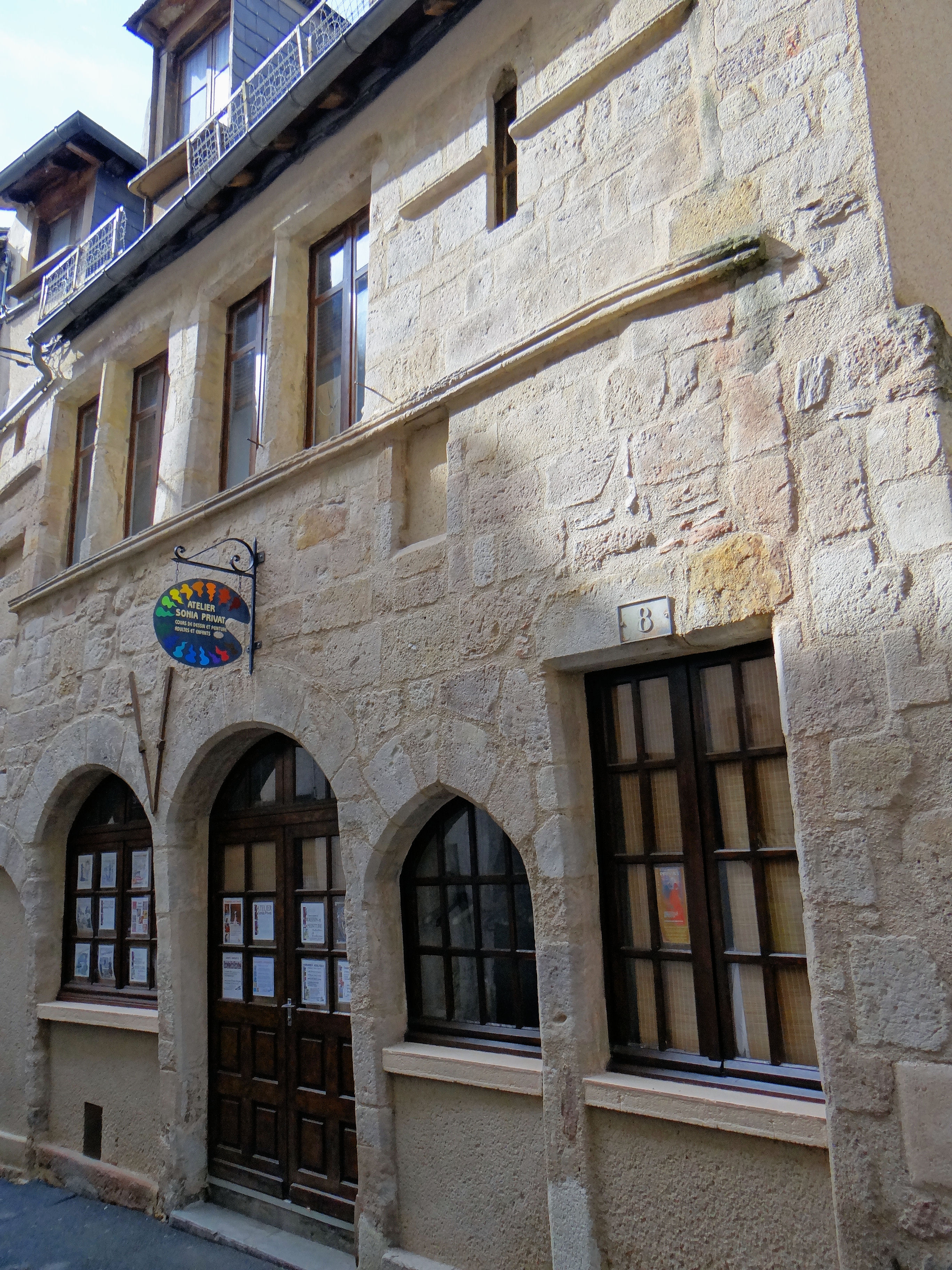

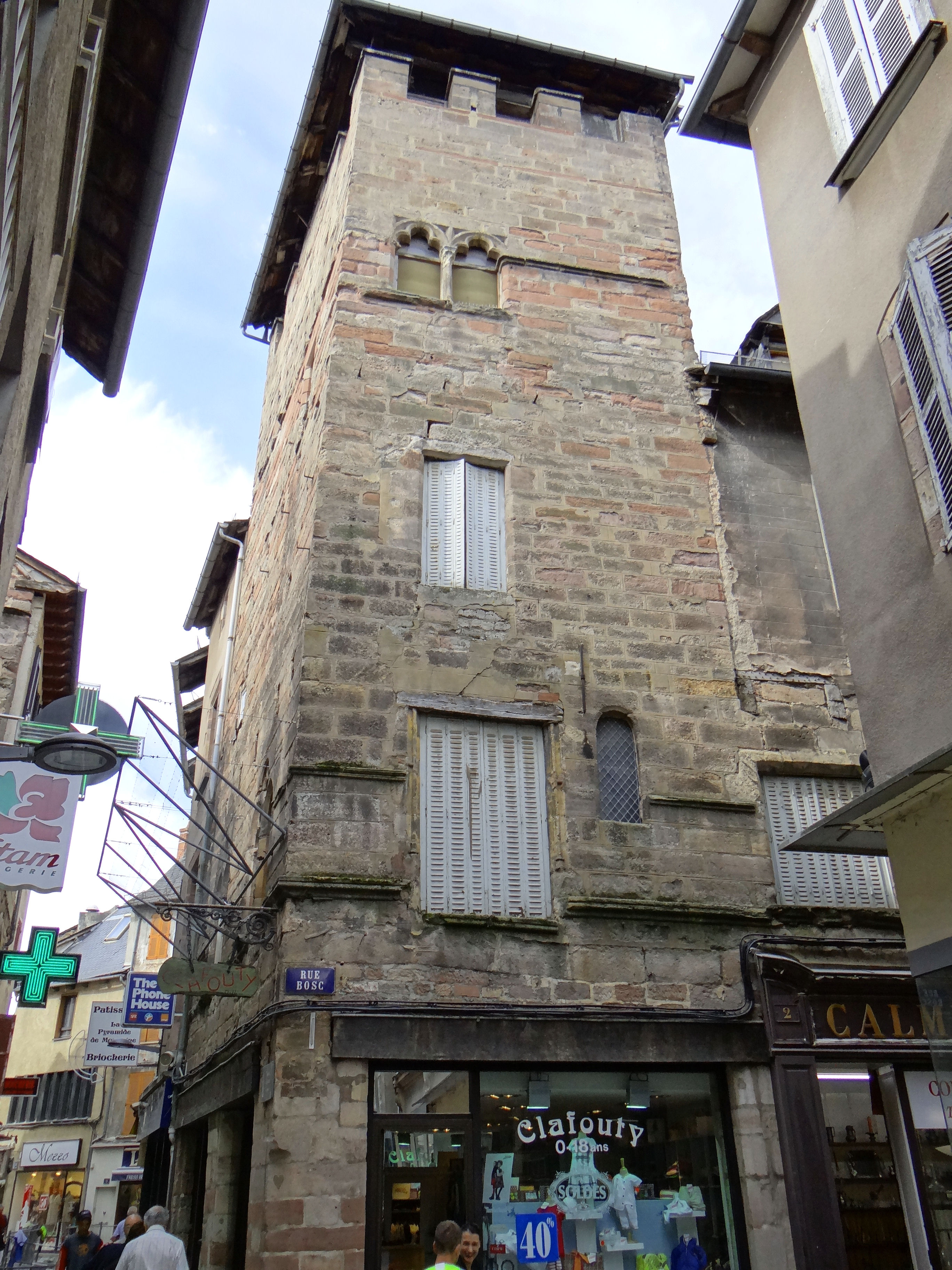

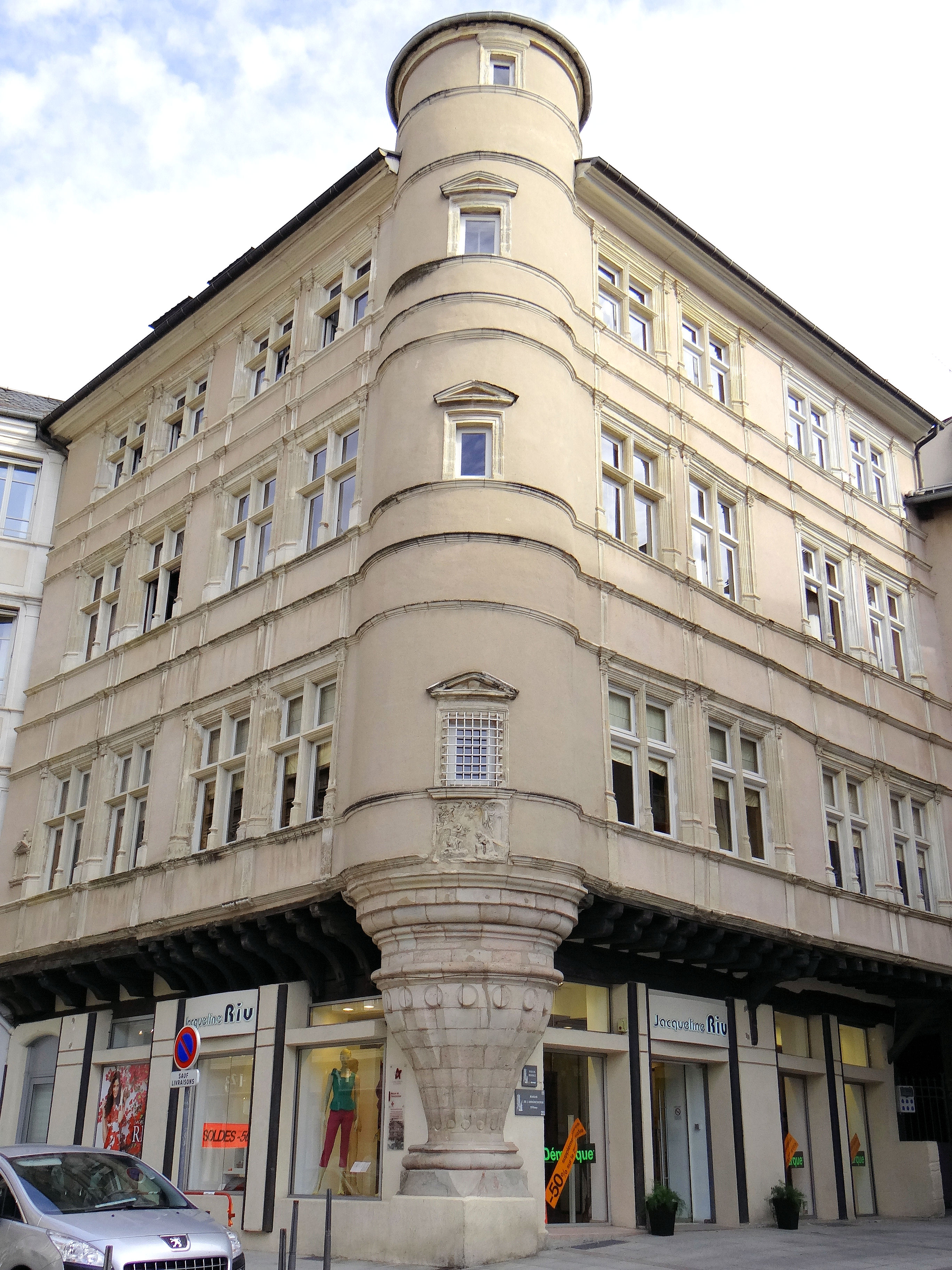

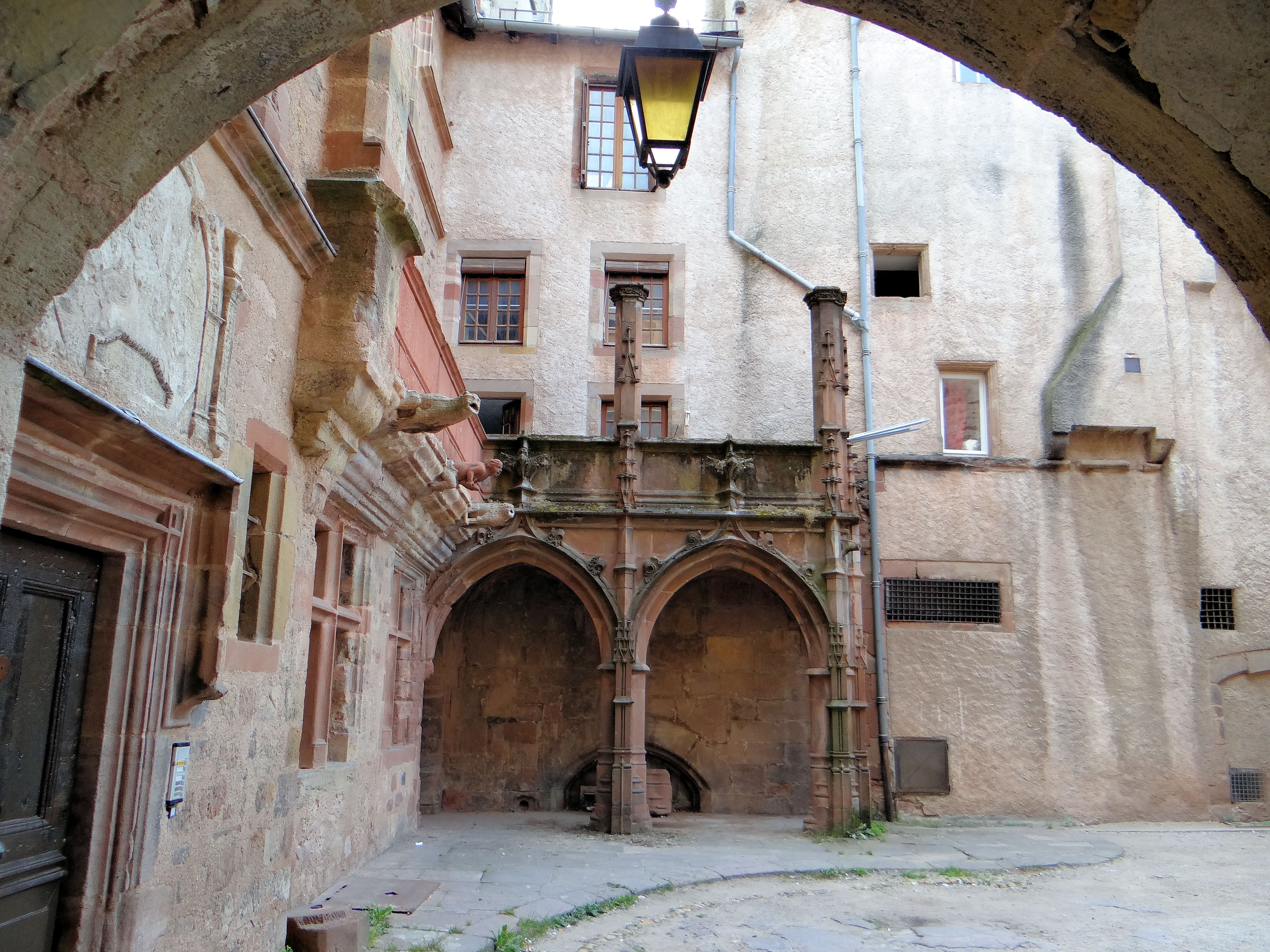

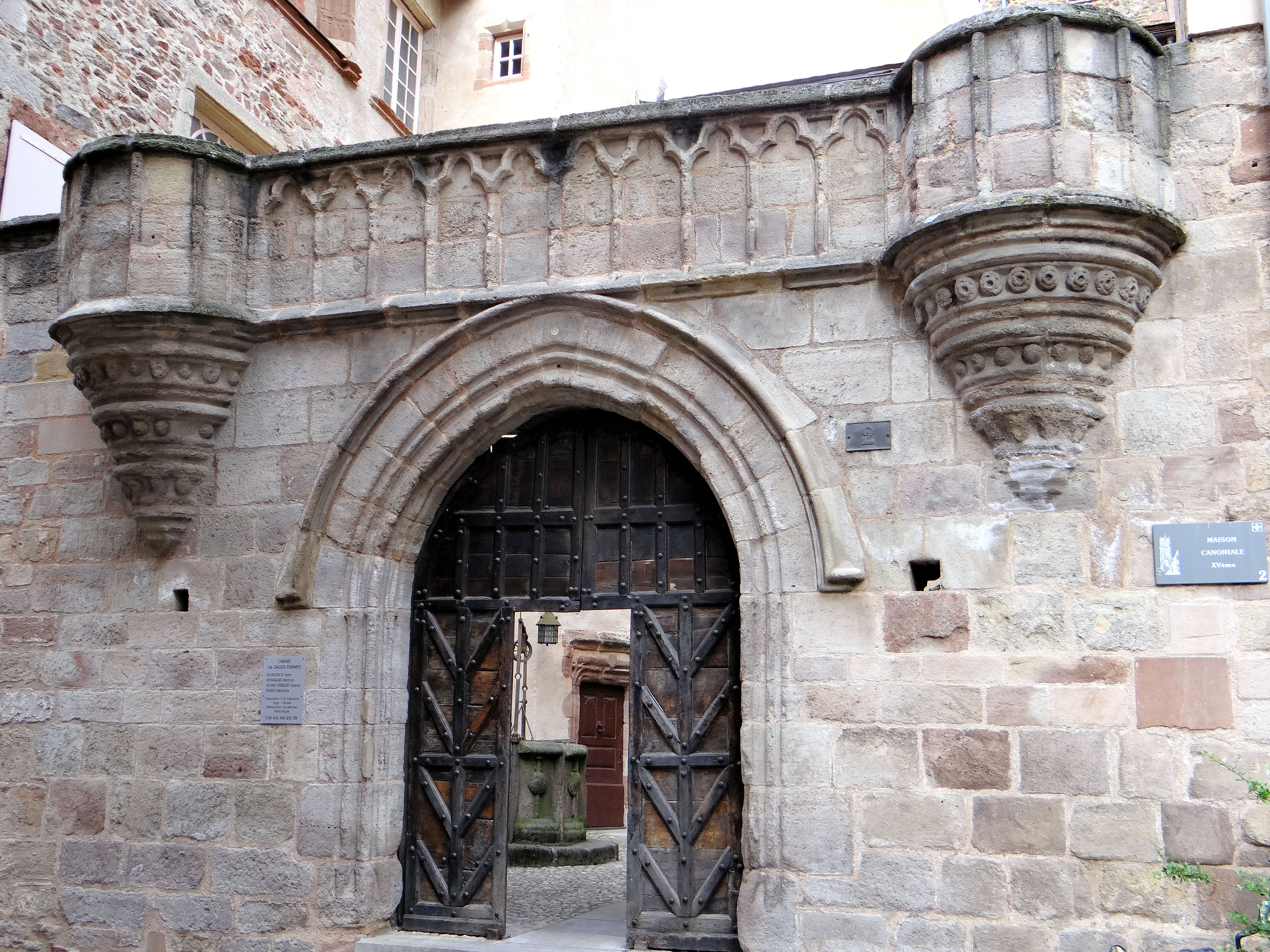

===== Layoule Bridge =====
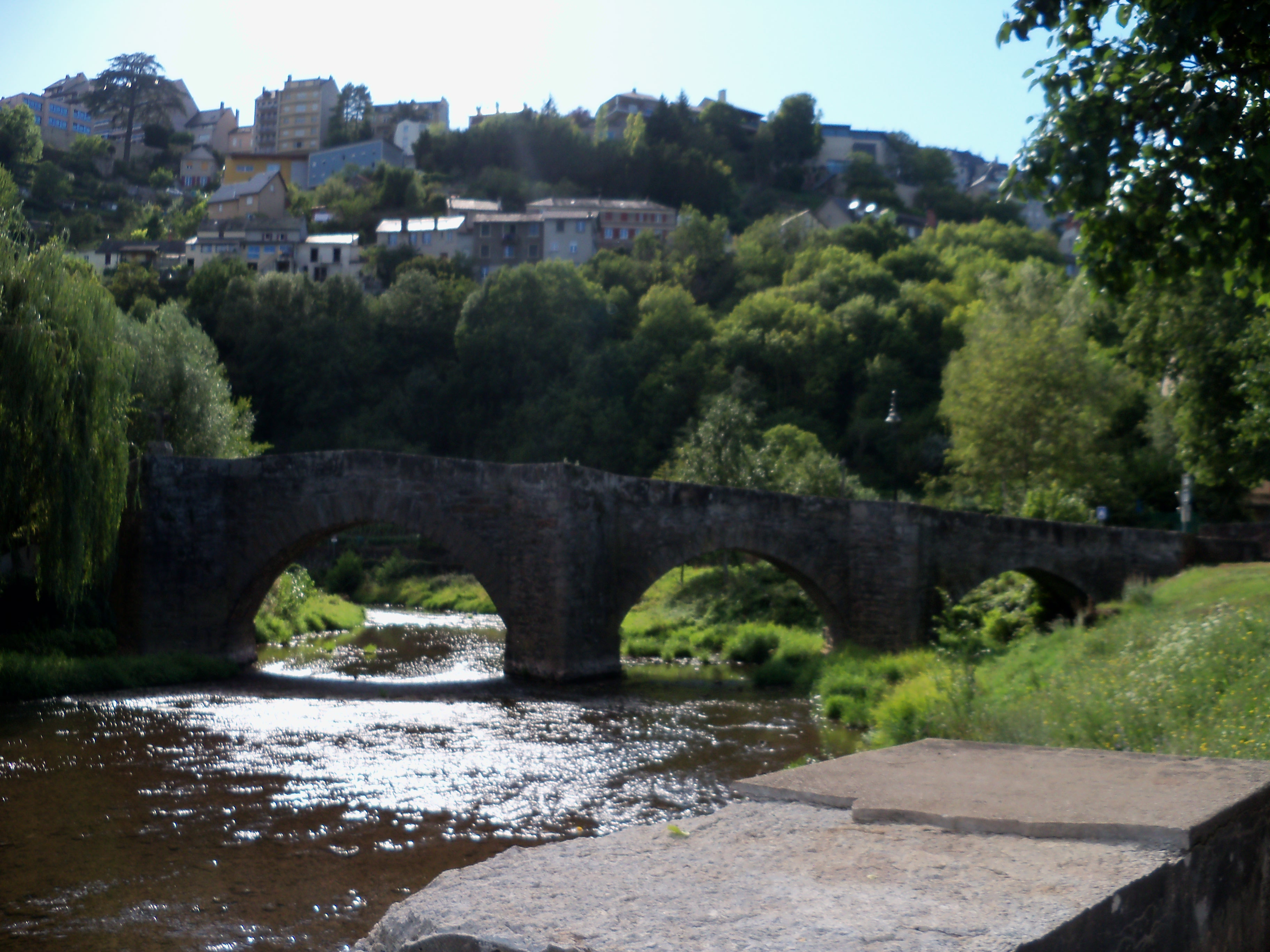
Layoule Bridge

Made a Historic Monument in 1947.

===== Château de Saint-Félix =====
Made a Historic Monument in 1984.

===== La Gascarie Viaduct =====
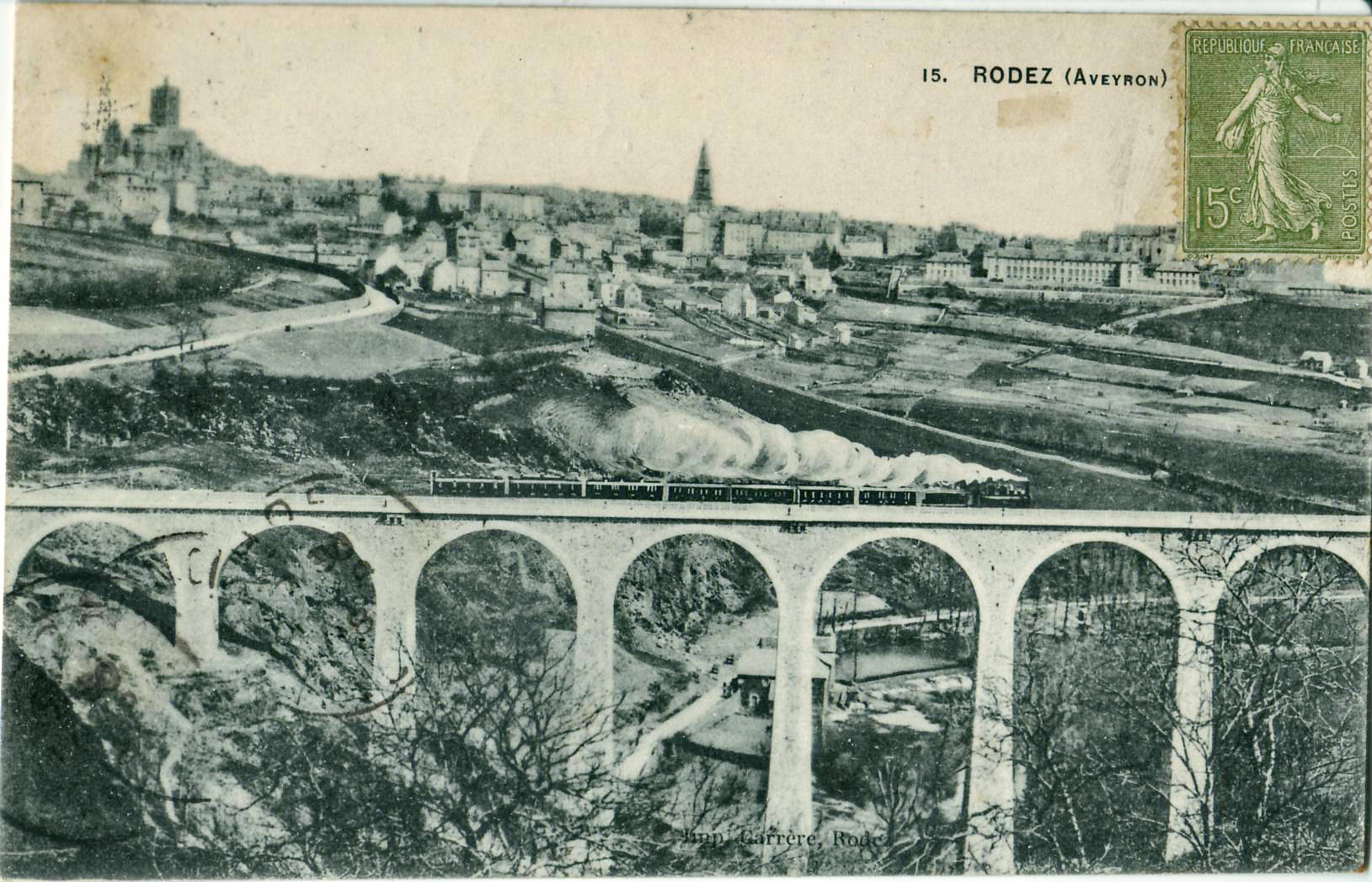
The Gascarie Viaduct, around 1910

Railway bridges of the 19th century, including the Gascarie Viaduct.

==== Parks and gardens ====
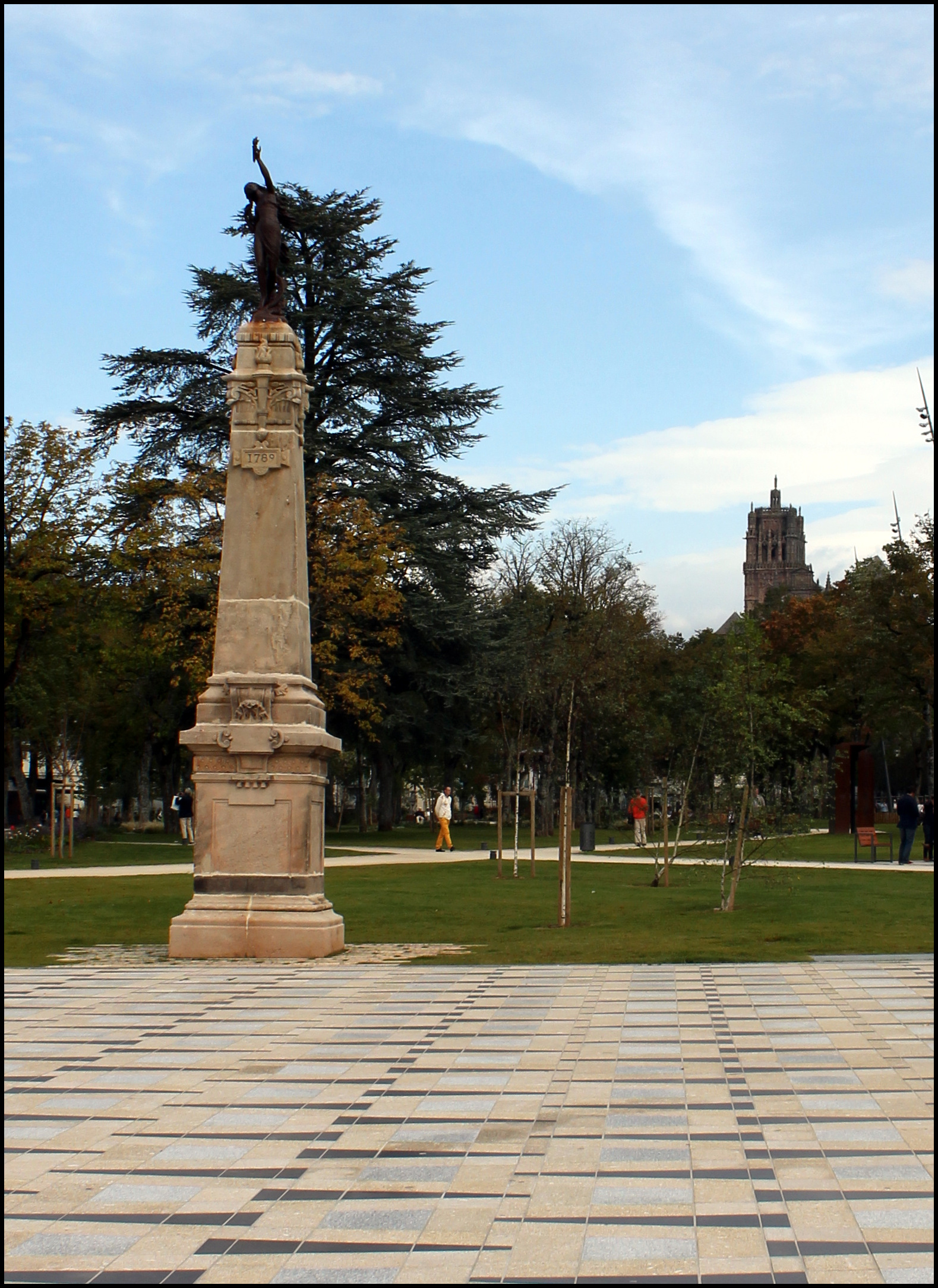
Foirail public garden

- Foirail public garden
- Square François Fabié: This small square presents a very broad view of all the southern part of the Rodez territory.

Rodez was awarded with three flowers of the competition of flowery cities and villages, was awarded 1st place in 1996, and 3rd in 2007. Rodez also has the label "Child-friendly city", given by UNICEF.

Combelles recreation park, located in the commune of La Monastère, a few kilometres from the city centre is at the heart of a park of 120 hectares (300 acres). It is a place which is dedicated to the activities of its equestrian centre and its holiday-village accommodation. Vabre Park offers children's activities with outdoor games. Rodez has an 18-hole golf course located more precisely in the commune of Onet-le-Château. Layoule, located on the edge of the Aveyron river, offers a route laid out for pedestrians or cyclists. Finally, there is also a guide Les Belles Balades de l’Aveyron [The beautiful walks of the Aveyron]. The Foirail, where the cultural buildings are integrated, offers a natural setting in the heart of the city.

=== Cultural heritage ===
==== Linguistic heritage ====
Occitan Cross

The city of Rodez (Rodés, in Rouergat) was one of the last centres of Occitania, with many troubadours who found refuge there and attempted to perpetuate the Occitan culture. Today, Occitania and the Langue d'Oc are in revival thanks to the Estivada of Rodez and the presence of numerous festive and cultural events. This language has become, over the years, a real cultural crossroads of the Pays d'Oc in the service of the revival of Occitan culture.

==== Learned society ====
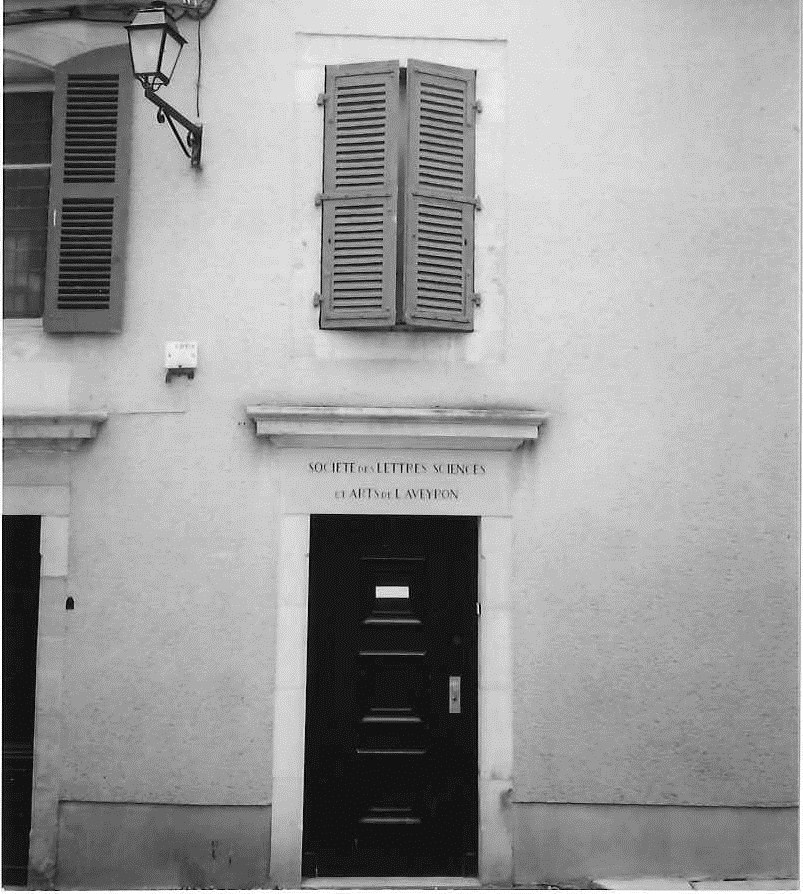
Society of letters of Aveyron

On 3 December 1836, at the invitation of Hippolyte de Barrau, the Society of Letters, Sciences and Arts of Aveyron was created in Rodez. Its purpose is the study of the history and the heritage inventory, both natural and cultural, of the Aveyron department, formerly Rouergue. This cultural institution was recognised as being of public utility on 29 October 1857. It is open to researchers, teachers, students, and to all those who are interested in the culture of Aveyron and the Rouergue. The Society of Letters, Sciences and Arts of Aveyron has a library of more than 50,000 books and several archival fonds.

==== Museums ====
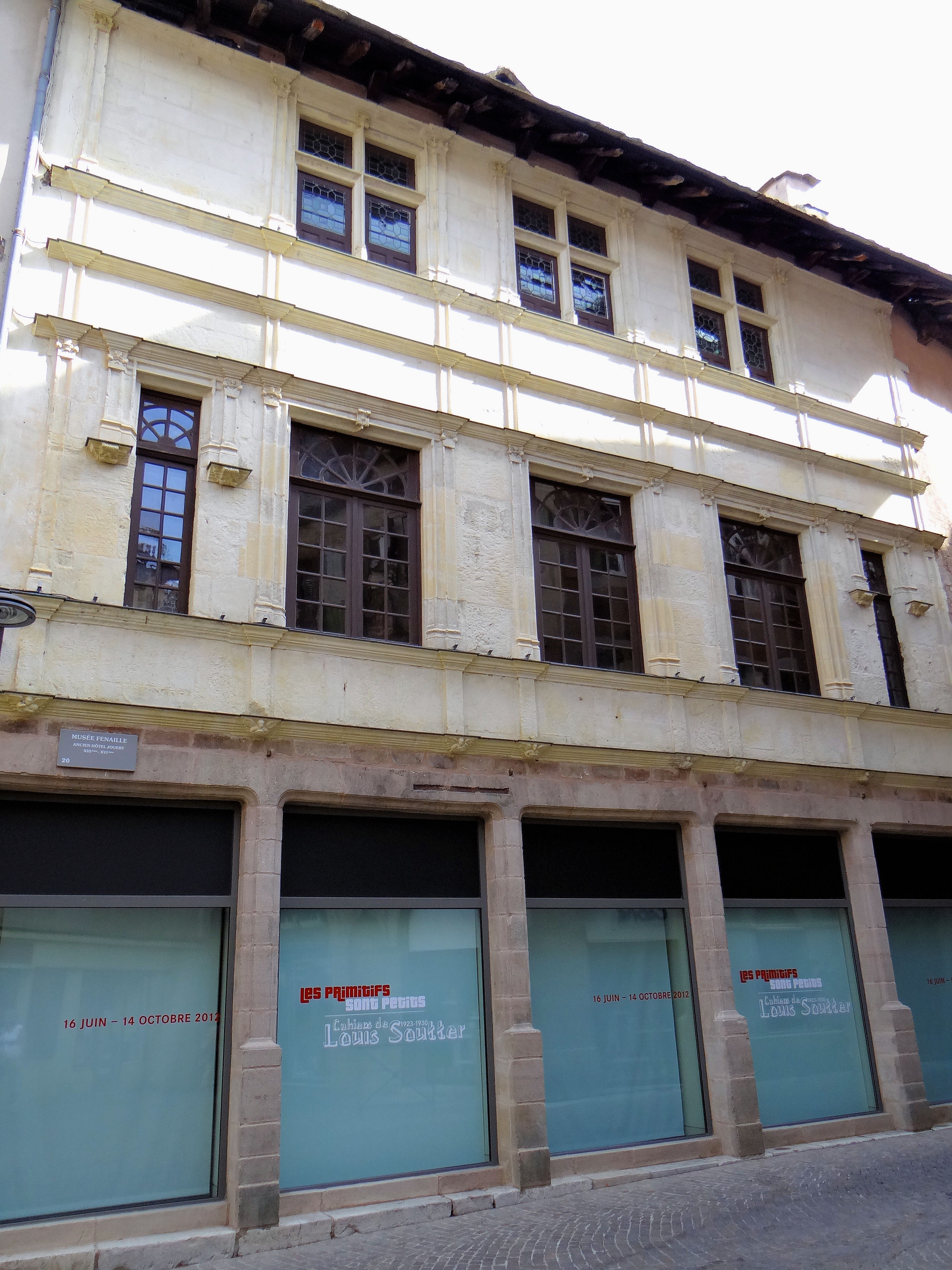
Fenaille museum housed in the Hotel Jouéry

Rodez has three museums:

- Musée Fenaille classified MH (1944): Museum of history and archaeology with a unique collection of statues and menhirs of the Rouergue. Its collections also include sculptures from other periods: antiquity, the Middle Ages, the Renaissance and modern times.
- Musée des beaux-arts Denys-Puech: Museum of contemporary art in which the sculptures and paintings of Denys Puech are shown, and which also hosts many temporary exhibitions.
- Musée Soulages: Soulages Museum, Museum of France, opened 31 May 2014. A large part of the works of Pierre Soulages and temporary exhibitions of international scope are shown.

==== Art galleries ====
- Galerie Sainte-Catherine
- Galerie Foch, open to all artists
- La Menuiserie
- Private galleries

==== Others ====
- Departmental archives of Aveyron
- Large multimedia library of Rodez, rich in old and current works.
- A House of Associations, close to the square of the sacred heart, to open its doors in January 2012. It allows activities of a social, cultural, educational, sporting or environmental character to be carried out.

=== Cultural facilities ===
- Cultural centre L'Amphithéâtre offers sports functions with several sports halls on several disciplines (fencing, climbing, badminton, dance etc.) as well as a large room accommodating up to 3000 people and being adaptable for congresses, trade shows, conferences, debates, seminars, shows or theatrical performances. In addition, for shows, concerts and other artistic performances, the programming of the facility offers a great place to internationally recognised artists.
- House of Youth and Culture offers opportunities for theatre and shows, entertainments, or congresses and conferences, exhibitions (several rooms of different capacity).
- Salle des fêtes [Festival hall]: Near Haras and the Paul Lignon Stadium, the hall of 2,800 square metres (30,000 sq ft) opened on 7 January 2012, by its designer, Emmanuel Nebout and political representatives.
- Palais des Congrès [Congress hall]: Boulevard de la République, it meets an economic role for enterprises, associations with several committee rooms and an auditorium and exhibition hall.
- National School of Music of the Grand Rodez: Music, exhibitions, conferences and debates.
- Theatre of Grand Rodez to Onet-le-Château, La Baleine: the acoustics are particularly designed for the performing arts and speech (theatre, symphonic music, opera). This building is located in the commune of Onet-le-Château and can also accommodate conventions and conferences with broadcast equipment, image and sound equipment with the latest technologies. The theatre, or more accurately the auditorium occupies 6,000 square metres (65,000 sq ft) for 500 seats at the service of culture. Indeed, this theatre consists of 3 levels on 2,000 square metres (22,000 sq ft), among technical premises, entrance hall, concert hall of 2,000 square metres (22,000 sq ft) with set of 240 square metres (2,600 sq ft), backstage, two collective areas, three individual areas, a quick area, government offices, a rehearsal room, two control rooms (including a mobile), changing rooms, two elevators for people with reduced mobility. Finally this auditorium of 500 seats is adjustable to 300 or 500 places. With a prestigious cultural programming, this building is a centre of culture in south-western France.
- Exhibition Park of Malan: Economic and cultural infrastructure, located on the edge of the RN88, this place is modular for congress, exhibitions, shows based on events, and offers entertainment venues and catering. It can accommodate up to 3000 people. Opening in 2015.
- Several municipal halls (municipal campsite, Calcomier, Saint-Éloi, Grange of Vabres and Foch parking) for meetings, activities, events.

=== Personalities linked to the commune ===
- Henri de Sévery (NC-1396) born in Sévery, died at Rodez, regent, vice-rector and Rector of the Comtat Venaissin, Bishop of Saint-Jean-de-Maurienne, then Bishop of Rodez.
- François d'Estaing (1501-1529), Bishop of Rodez.
- Jean Salvanh (1510s – after 1580), architect
- Laurent Macte or Macty, native doctor of Colmars (Alpes de Haute-Provence). He left the city in 1564 to study medicine in Montpellier, then in 1567, came practise in Rodez. He left a book of reason evoking the troubles of his time and its manifestations in Rodez. The Société des lettres, sciences et arts de l'Aveyron studied and chronicled in volume 25 of his memoirs in 1942 the 'journal' of this character. Laurent Macte died at the beginning of the 17th century in Rodez.
- Ambroise Crozot, painter born in Rodez at the end of the 17th century.
- Jean Calmette (1692-1740), Jesuit, missionary to India, Indologist, was born in Rodez.
- Saint Jean-Chrysostôme de Villaret (born in Rodez in 1739-1824), Bishop under the First Empire
- Charles Carnus (1749-1792), man of the Church, scientific, speleologist.
- Antoine Claude Dièche, general of division and French revolutionary, born in Rodez.
- Antoine Bernardin Fualdès (1761-1817), prosecutor, assassinated.
- Jean-Alexis Béteille (1763-1847), French general of the Gendarmerie.
- Sébastien Viala (1763-1848), brigade general (1806), Knight of the Empire (letters patent of 22 October 1810), mayor of Rodez.
- Maurice Andrieu Deputy of the Haute-Garonne, born in Rodez.
- Amans-Alexis Monteil was born on 7 June 1769 in Rodez. A school bears his name.
- Raymond Gayrard, engraver and sculptor, born in 1777 in Rodez, died in 1858 in Paris (he was responsible for the statue of Samson that adorned the Place d'Armes in Rodez).
- Hippolyte de Barrau (1794-1863), historian and founder of the Société des lettres, sciences et arts de l'Aveyron.
- Eugène de Barrau (1801-1887), brother of the preceding, lawyer, historian, Vice President of the Société des lettres, sciences et arts de l'Aveyron, legitimist.
- Natalis Flaugergues (1823-1893), soldier and author in 1874 of a text where he claimed that Rodez is at the centre of the world.
- Amans Joseph Fabre (1842-1916), writer, historian, Member of Parliament and Senator of Aveyron.
- Antonin Artaud (1896-1948), writer and poet, interned from February 1943 to May 1946 in the Paraire departmental lunatic asylum.
- Joseph Bastide, lawyer, the Bar Association of Rodez, Conservative deputy in 1936 and 1945.
- Eugène Raynaldy (1869-1938), French politician born in Rodez, he was Senator of Aveyron from 1930 to 1938.
- Roland Boscary-Monsservin (1904-1988), French politician born in Rodez.
- Idebert Exbrayat, pastor, born in 1913 in Calvisson, organized in Rodez the rescue of many Jews during the Occupation. He was named as his wife, Righteous Among the Nations
- Auguste Anglès (1914-1983), writer, resistant and French academic born in Rodez.
- Pierre Soulages, painter, engraver, and sculptor, born in Rodez in 1919.
- Marie-Eugène de l'Enfant-Jésus (1894, 1967), born Henri Grialou in the Gua Quarter, he became a priest in the Carmelite order. He founded the Institut Notre-Dame de Vie. He is in the process of beatification.
- Jean Fabre, French Rugby Union international, occupied the position of flanker in the Stade Toulousain during the 1960s, born in 1935 in Rodez.
- Marc Censi, born in Rodez on 24 January 1936, politician, Mayor of Rodez from 1983 to 2008 and president of the regional Council of Midi-Pyrénées from 1988 to 1998.
- Bertrand Delanoë, former Mayor of Paris, spent his teenage years in Rodez and studied at the private Lycée François d'Estaing.
- Anne-Marie Escoffier, former Minister-delegate responsible for decentralization, General Councillor of the Canton of Rignac with the General Council of Aveyron in Rodez, former prefect and Senator of Aveyron between April 1999 and September 2001 and between October 2008 and July 2012.
- Jacques Puel (1949-2008), the first Rodez cardio-surgeon to implant a coronary stent, in 1986.
- François Kevorkian, DJ and music producer, was born in Rodez in 1954.
- Dominique Reynié (1960-), political scientist, born in Rodez.
- Bernard Laporte, born in Rodez in 1964, former Secretary of State of sports, former coach of France's rugby union team, ex-UA Gaillac, and the CA Béglais, former coach of the Stade Bordelais and the Stade Français.
- Gaëtan Roussel, born 13 October 1972 in Rodez, singer and founder of the rock band Louise Attaque.
- Olivier Asmaker, cyclist and teammate of Laurent Jalabert, grew up in Rodez.
- Cyril Lignac, cook and host on M6, was born 5 November 1977 in Rodez and studied in Aveyron.
- Julien Pierre, international rugby, second line of ASM Clermont Auvergne, born in 1981 in Rodez.
- Sabrina Viguier (b. 1981), French football player who currently plays for Olympique Lyonnais and France's football team (last selection in 2011).
- Alexandre Geniez, professional cyclist, born in 1988.

=== Heraldry, logo and motto ===
==== Heraldry ====
Arms of Rodez	Malte-Brun, in France illustrated (1882), reported two different blazons: "Of gules, three bezants of or."; "Of gules, three wheels of or, two in chief and one in base; to the chief of azure, charged three fleurs-de-lis of or," and quotes: "Civitas Ruthena deo fidelis et regi semper." (The Ruthenoise community of eternal fidelity to God and the King.) The wheels (rodas) canting arms of Rodez, resemble bezants, hence the confusion of the blazon. The head of "France" ("of azure charged with three fleurs-de-lis of or") corresponds to an increase granted by King Henry IV in 1596, and therefore is not in contradiction with the first blazon, oldest (should say "stitched"). The accuracy of two in chief and one in base for the position of the wheels is useless (it's the default position) and therefore brings no difference between the two blazons. A more correct Blazon would be: "of gules, three wheels of or; in chief stitched of modern France."

==== Logo of Rodez ====
The Rodez logo consists of a small yellow drawing representing the branch from the bottom of the Occitan cross - this cross on the flag of Midi-Pyrénées - and the Rodez name in red capitals. The upper part of the logo, meanwhile, represents the Cathedral of Rodez perched on its "piton". The slogan: "Rodez, un art de ville" [Rodez, a city of art] is sometimes added to the logo.

== Notable people ==
- Leïla Lacan (born 2004), WNBA player

== See also ==
- Communes of the Aveyron department
- Diocese of Rodez

== Bibliography ==
=== Geography - geology ===
- Suau, Bernadette; Bugat, Annie; Verninas, Geneviève; Bories, Marie-Claude (1983). Rodez, Aveyron, plan et notice [Rodez, Aveyron : map and instructions] (in French). Paris: Ed. du CNRS. ISBN 2-222-03298-9. 3 p. : ill.; 42 cm + 1 plan dépl. + 1 f. de carte + 1 f. de légende. (BnF no FRBNF37310789k)
- Boisse de Black, Yvonne (1933). Le détroit de Rodez et ses bordures cristallines, étude géologique et morphologique [The Strait of Rodez and clear borders : Geological and morphological study] (in French). Vol. XXXVI. Paris; Liège: Librairie polytechnique Ch. Béranger. ISSN 0366-4201. ill.; 25 cm + 1 carte géologique. (BnF 373759558)
- Trumpy, Daniel M. (1984). Le Lias moyen et supérieur des Grands Causses et de la région de Rodez, contributions stratigraphiques, sédimentologiques et géochimiques à la connaissance d'un bassin à sédimentation marneuse... [The Middle and Upper Lias of Grands Causses and the Rodez area : stratigraphic, sedimentological and geochemical contributions to the knowledge of a marl sedimentation basin...] (in French). Pau: Université de Pau et des pays de l'Adour. ISSN 0247-8463. ill.; 30 et 57 x 82 cm. (BnF no FRBNF37699009h)

=== Urbanism - administration ===
- Centre d'études des transports urbains (France); Direction départementale de l'équipement (Aveyron); Ville de Rodez (1983). Étude d'environnement Rocade de l'Auterne [Environmental study of the bypass of Auterne] (in French). Paris: CETUR. ISBN 2-222-03298-9. 3 p. : ill.; 42 cm + 1 plan dépl. + 1 f. de carte + 1 f. de légende. (BnF no FRBNF35672189w)
- Communauté d'agglomération du Grand Rodez; Lourgant, Julie; Joy, Diane (2011). Chroniques du patrimoine, Grand Rodez, Recueil d'articles précédemment publ. dans le journal "Centre-Presse", septembre 2010-juin 2011 [Chronicles of the Heritage of Grand Rodez: Collection of articles previously publ . in the newspaper "Centre-Presse", September 2010 - June 2011] (in French). Rodez: Éd. du Musée Fenaille. ISBN 978-2-9540689-0-9. ill. en noir et en coul., couv. ill.; 21 cm. (BnF no FRBNF42563529p)
- Agence publique pour l'immobilier de la justice (France); Weiss, Jean-Pierre; Lansoy, Yves; Caumette, Marie-Bénédicte (2013). Maison d'arrêt de Rodez, Aveyron [Rodez Prison, Aveyron] (in French). Paris: APIJ. ill. en coul., couv. ill. en coul.; 24 cm. (BnF no FRBNF436441407)
- Terral, Pierre-Marie (2011). Bosch Rodez, une ville, une usine [Bosch Rodez, a town, a factory] (in French). Toulouse: Éd. Privat. ISBN 978-2-7089-8352-6. ill. en noir et en coul., couv. ill.; 18 x 25 cm. (BnF no FRBNF42558960x)
- Censi, Marc (2012). Rodez, la révolution tranquille de l'intercommunalité [Rodez, the quiet revolution of intercommunality] (in French). Rodez: Maison du livre. ISBN 978-2-9543043-0-4. ill., couv. ill.; 23 cm. (BnF no FRBNF42798334w)

=== History ===
- Enjalbert, Henri (1981). Histoire de Rodez [History of Rodez] (in French). Toulouse: Privat. ISBN 2-7089-8218-4. ISSN 0293-3675. Pays et villes de France. (BnF no FRBNF347314452)
- Taussat, Robert (1992). Sept siècles autour de la cathédrale de Rodez, histoire et vie quotidienne [Seven centuries around the cathedral of Rodez, history and everyday life] (in French). Rodez: Éd. du Rouergue. ISBN 2-905209-55-0. (BnF no FRBNF355239116)
- Dhombres, Jean; Labat, Yves; Thubières, Édouard; Vignes, Roger (1996). Rodez, deux mille ans d'histoire [Rodez, two thousand years of history] (in French). Rodez: Éd. du Rouergue. ISBN 2-84156-022-8. (BnF no FRBNF358567941)

=== Prehistory - Antiquity ===
- Philippon, Annie; Baud, Michel; Caubet, Annie; Costantini, Georges (2007). Statues-menhirs, des énigmes de pierre venues du fond des âges [Statues-menhirs : des énigmes de pierre venues du fond des âges] (in French). Rodez: Éd. du Rouergue. ISBN 978-2-84156-942-7. ill. en noir et en coul., couv. ill.; 24 cm. (BnF no FRBNF412679142)
- Albenque, Alexandre (1948). Les Rutènes, études d'histoire, d'archéologie et de toponymie gallo-romaines [The Rutenes: Studies of history, archaeology and Gallo-Roman Toponymy] (in French). Rodez: P. Carrere. cartes, ill.; 25 cm. (BnF no FRBNF37394724m)
- Gruat, Philippe; Marty, Georges (2003). Vivre et mourir à Segodunum durant l'Antiquité, les enseignements des fouilles de Notre Dame du Bon Accueil à Rodez, Aveyron [Segodunum to live and die in antiquity : The techings of excavations of Notre Dame du Bon Accueil in Rodez, Aveyron] (in French). Rodez; Montrozier: Musée du Rouergue; Musée de Montrozier. ISBN 2-907279-57-2. ISSN 1242-7896. ill., couv. ill. en coul.; 24 cm. (BnF no FRBNF391067005)

=== Middle Ages ===
- Archives départementales (Aveyron); Lemaître, Jean-Loup (1985). Manuscrits du Chapître et de l'Évêché de Rodez, manuscrits conservés aux Archives départementales et à l'évêché [Manuscripts of Chapître and Rodez Bishopric : manuscripts kept in the departmental archives and the bishopric] (in French). Rodez: Archives départementales de l'Aveyron. ISBN 2-86012-007-6. couv. ill. en coul.; 30 cm. (BnF no FRBNF366194132)
- Nougaret, Roger (1986). Hôpitaux, léproseries et bodomies de Rodez, de la Grande peste à l'hôpital général : vers 1340-1676 [Hospitals, leper colonies and bodomies of Rodez : Great Plague General Hospital : towards 1340-1676] (in French). Rodez: Subervie. ill., couv. ill.; 21 cm. (BnF no FRBNF35006033g)
- Lemaître, Nicole (1988). Le Rouergue flamboyant, clergé et paroisses du diocèse de Rodez, 1417–1563 [The flamboyant Rouergue clergy and parishes of the diocese of Rodez, 1417–1563] (in French). Paris: Éd. du Cerf. ISBN 2-204-02851-7. ill., couv. ill. en coul.; 24 cm. (BnF no FRBNF34938787v)
- Austry, Raymond d'; Débat, Antoine (1991). Livre de raison de Raymond d'Austry, bourgeois et marchand de Rodez (1576-1624) / transcrit et annoté par Antoine Débat [Book of reason of Raymond Austry, bourgeois and merchant of Rodez (1576-1624) / transcribed and annotated by Antoine Debate] (in French). Rodez: Société des lettres, sciences et arts de l'Aveyron. ISBN 2-908570-01-7. ill., couv. ill.; 24 cm. (BnF no FRBNF36653510p)
- Bousquet, Jacques (1992). Le Rouergue au premier Moyen âge. Tome 1, vers 800-vers 1250 : les pouvoirs, leurs rapports et leurs domaines [Rouergue in the early Middle Ages. Volume 1, to 800 - 1250 : the powers, their relationships and their areas] (in French). Rodez: Société des lettres, sciences et arts de l'Aveyron. ISBN 2-908570-02-5. ISSN 1245-9747. couv. ill.; 24 cm. (BnF no FRBNF35552831x)
- Bousquet, Jacques (1994). Le Rouergue au premier Moyen âge. Tome 2, vers 800-vers 1250 : les pouvoirs, leurs rapports et leurs domaines [Rouergue the early Middle Ages. Volume 2: 800 - to 1250 : the powers, their relationships and their areas] (in French). Rodez: Société des lettres, sciences et arts de l'Aveyron. ISBN 2-908570-04-1. ISSN 1245-9747. couv. ill.; 24 cm. (BnF no FRBNF36684881w)
- Wroe, Ann (1996). Le marchand, le juge et le magot, chronique d'une querelle familiale au Moyen âge; trad. de l'anglais [The merchant, the judge and the loot, chronicle of a family feud in the Middle Ages; trans. English] (in French). Paris: J.-C. Lattès. ISBN 2-7096-1700-5. couv. ill. en coul.; 23 cm. (BnF no FRBNF358230477)
- Médiathèque municipale (Rodez) (2003). Un livre d'heures à l'usage de Rodez, vers 1460-1470 [A book of hours for the use of Rodez, towards 1460-1470] (in French). Rodez: Médiathèque de Rodez. ISBN 2-9519594-0-0. ill. en coul., couv. ill. en coul.; 24 cm. (BnF no FRBNF38974346k)
- Desachy, Matthieu (2005). Cité des hommes, le chapitre cathédral de Rodez, 1215-1562 [City of Men, the cathedral chapter of Rodez, 1215-1562] (in French). Rodez: Éd. du Rouergue. ISBN 2-84156-665-X. couv. ill. en coul.; 25 cm. (BnF no FRBNF40063427k)
- Dufour, Jean (1989). Les Évêques d'Albi, de Cahors et de Rodez, des origines à la fin du 17e seicle [The Bishops of Albi, Cahors and Rodez, from its origins to the late 17th seicle] (in French). Paris: Éd. du CTHS. ISBN 2-7355-0176-0. ISSN 0985-5106. couv. ill.; 24 cm. (BnF no FRBNF35041801p)
- Bonal, Antoine (1885). Comté et comtes de Rodez [County and Counts of Rodez] (in French). Rodez: E. Carrère. in-8. (BnF no FRBNF30124501n)
- Bonald, Joseph de (2010). Les comtes de Rodez et les seigneurs de Bénavent, Fac-sim. de l'éd. de : Paris : H. Champion, 1905 [The Counts of Rodez and the lords of Bénavent, Fac -sim . of Ed. from: Paris : H. Champion, 1905] (in French). Nîmes: Lacour-Ollé. ISBN 978-2-7504-2523-4. ISSN 0989-4616. couv. ill. en coul.; 21 cm. (BnF no FRBNF421992862)

=== Modern era ===
- Mouysset, Sylvie (2000). Le pouvoir dans la bonne ville, les consuls de Rodez sous l'Ancien régime [The power in the right city, the consuls of Rodez under the Ancien Regime] (in French). Rodez: Société des lettres, sciences et arts de l'Aveyron. ISBN 2-912025-04-4. ill., couv. ill.; 24 cm. (BnF no FRBNF371088281)
- Médiathèque municipale (Rodez) (2002). Atlas, cartes et plans sous l'Ancien Régime dans les collections de la Médiathèque de Rodez, exposition présentée à la Médiathèque de Rodez du 3 mai au 4 juillet 2002 [Atlases, maps and plans under the Ancien Regime in the collections of the Library of Rodez, exhibition at the Library of Rodez from 3 May to 4 July 2002] (in French). Rodez: Médiathèque de Rodez. ill., couv. ill. en coul.; 30 cm. (BnF no FRBNF400876830)
- Maurel, Jean (2006). Rodez et son pays au temps des Lumières, chronique intime [Rodez and its country during the Enlightenment, intimate chronicle] (in French). Toulouse: J. Maurel. ISBN 2-9508759-5-5. ill., couv. ill.; 24 cm. (BnF no FRBNF40933482n)

=== French Revolution ===
- Andrieu, Alfred (28 December 1927). Les prêtres-martyrs de la place du Bourg, à Rodez (1793-1794) [The priest-martyrs of the Place du Bourg, in Rodez (1793-1794)] (in French). Rodez: P. Carrère. In-8, 55 p.(BnF no FRBNF31721391)

=== Contemporary era ===
- Carcenac, Yves (2012). Henri Carcenac, 1790-1855, un maire de Rodez tourné vers l'avenir [enri Carcenac, 1790-1855, forward-looking mayor of Rodez] (in French). Montauban: Éd. Toute latitude-Terres d'excellence. ISBN 978-2-35282-029-1. couv. ill.; 22 cm. (BnF no FRBNF426392422)
- Saboya, Emma-Paule (1984). À l'ombre de la cathédrale, mémoire d'une collégienne (1923-1930) [In the shadow of the cathedral, memory of a schoolgirl (1923-1930)] (in French). Rodez: Subervie. couv. ill.; 19 cm. (BnF no FRBNF34765733g)
- Pouget, Bernard (1996). Les enfants du faubourg de Rodez, 1930-1950 [The children of the suburb of Rodez, 1930-1950] (in French). Martel: Éd. du Laquet. ISBN 2-910333-46-9. couv. ill. en coul.; 23 cm. (BnF no FRBNF36158882q)

=== The Fualdès Case ===
- Darmon, Pierre (1991). La rumeur de Rodez, histoire d'un procès truqué [The rumor of Rodez, story of a rigged trial] (in French). Paris: A. Michel. ISBN 2-226-05447-2. couv. ill. en coul.; 23 cm. (BnF no FRBNF366528030)
- Rouquette, Michel-Louis (1992). La rumeur et le meurtre, l'affaire Fualdès [Rumor and murder, Fualdes case] (in French). Paris: Presses universitaires de France. ISBN 2-13-044503-9. ISSN 0768-0503. (BnF no FRBNF366583679)
- Méraux, Philippe (1999). Clarisse et les égorgeurs, l'affaire Fualdès [Clarisse and cutthroats, the case Fualdes] (in French). Rodez: Éd. du Rouergue. ISBN 2-84156-197-6. ill., couv. ill. en coul.; 24 cm. (BnF no FRBNF37082505k)
- Bony, Maurice; Batut, Amans (2008). L'afar de Fualdes, qué n'en sabèm uèi ? [The question of Fualdes, of which we know today ?] (in Occitan). Onet-le-Château: Éd. du Grelh Roergàs. ISBN 978-2-85579-072-5. (BnF no FRBNF41438489j)
- Astruc, Paul (1984). Fualdès [Fualdès] (in French). Rodez: Éd. du Rouergue. ISBN 2-905209-00-3. (BnF no FRBNF366300167)

=== Notre-Dame Cathedral ===
- Société des lettres, sciences et arts de l'Aveyron (1979). VIIe centenaire de la cathédrale de Rodez, communications / présentées à la séance de la Société des lettres du 20 mai 1977... Rodez [Seventh centenary of the Rodez Cathedral : communications / presented at the meeting of the Society of letters of 20 May 1977 ... Rodez] (in French). Rodez: Société des lettres, sciences et arts de l'Aveyron. ill., couv. ill.; 22 cm. (BnF no FRBNF34684767s)
- Delmas, Claire (1986). Inauguration du grand orgue reconstruit de la cathédrale de Rodez, 10 et 11 octobre 1986 (programme) [Inauguration of the rebuilt organ of Rodez Cathedral : 10 and 11 October 1986 (program)] (in French). Rodez: Ville de Rodez. Non paginé : couv. ill.; 30 cm. (BnF no FRBNF37070394s)
- Dulau, Robert (1987). Voyage en cathédrale [Travel in the cathedral] (in French). Rodez: Éd. du Rouergue. ISBN 2-905209-09-7. (BnF no FRBNF34968270c)
- Delmas, Claire (1991). Cathédrale de Rodez [Rodez Cathedral] (in French). Saint-Georges-de-Luzençon: Ed. du Beffroi. ISBN 2-908123-09-6. ill. en coul., couv. ill. en coul.; 22 cm. (BnF no FRBNF35551957n)
- Bessière, Gérard; Vulliez, Hyacinthe (1994). "La mise au tombeau" de la cathédrale de Rodez ["The Entombment" of the Rodez Cathedral] (in French). Rodez: Ed. du Rouergue. ISBN 2-905209-96-8. ill. en coul., couv. ill. en coul.; 25 cm. (BnF no FRBNF35740777m)
- Magne, F. (2001). Notice archéologique sur l'église cathédrale de Rodez, Fac-sim. de l'éd. de Rodez : Impr. N. Ratery, 1842 [Archaeological instructions on Rodez Cathedral Church : Fac-sim . of Ed. Rodez : Impr. N. Ratery 1842] (in French). Nîmes: C. Lacour. ISBN 2-84692-149-0. ISSN 0989-4616. couv. ill.; 21 cm. (BnF no FRBNF37650052n)
- Talvard, Françoise (2005). La maîtrise de la cathédrale de Rodez aux 17e et 18e siecles [Mastering the Cathedral of Rodez in the seventeenth and eighteenth centuries] (in French). Versailles: Éd. du Centre de musique baroque de Versailles. ISBN 2-911239-46-6. ill., fac-sim.; 30 cm. (BnF no FRBNF400248540)
- La cathédrale de Rodez, les vitraux de Stéphane Belzère [Rodez cathedral : stained glass of Stéphane Belzère] (in French). Paris: Éd. du Patrimoine. 2008. ISBN 978-2-7577-0028-0. ill. en noir et en coul., couv. ill. en coul.; 23 cm. (BnF no FRBNF41312162n)

=== Miscellaneous ===
- Aveyron. Archives départementales; Bousquet, Jacques (1961). En Rouergue à travers le temps, guide commenté du Musée des archives départementales [Rouergue through time, the commentary guide of the museum departmental archives] (in French). Rodez: Archives départementales. In-8°. (BnF no FRBNF33110879n)
- Bernard, Christian; Lycée agricole (Rodez) (1983). La Flore du domaine du Lycée agricole de Rodez-La Roque [Flora of the area of the agricultural school of La Roque - Rodez] (in French). Rodez: Lycée agricole. 54 f. : ill., couv. ill.; 30 cm. (BnF no FRBNF34713536f)
- Ferdière, Gaston (1992). Rapport sur le fonctionnement de l'hôpital psychiatrique de Rodez du 23 juillet 1941 au 30 novembre 1942 [Report on the functioning of the psychiatric hospital of Rodez of 23 July 1941 to 30 November 1942] (in French). Paris: Maxmed--Nervure. ill.; 30 cm. (BnF no FRBNF366694493)
- Taussat, Robert (1998). Rodez, un nom, une rue [Rodez, a name, a street] (in French). Rodez: Société des lettres, sciences et arts de l'Aveyron. ISBN 2-908570-07-6. ill., couv. ill. en coul.; 24 cm. (BnF no FRBNF370320322)
- Cosson, Jean-Michel (2003). Histoire des rues de Rodez [History of the streets of Rodez] (in French). Romagnat: de Borée. ISBN 2-84494-198-2. ill., couv. ill.; 31 cm. (BnF no FRBNF391035346)
- Samson-Bécouze, Catherine (2001). Rodez [Rodez] (in French). Rodez: Éd. du Rouergue. ISBN 2-84156-304-9. ill. en noir et en coul., couv. ill. en coul.; 21 cm. (BnF no FRBNF37716179r)
- La Dépêche du Midi (Toulouse); Hurel, Stéphane; Boudes, Claude (2008). RAF, 80 ans de fidélité, du stade ruthénois au Rodez Aveyron Football [RAF 80 years of loyalty, the stadium Rodez Rodez AF] (in French). Bez-et-Esparon: Études & communication éd. ISBN 978-2-911722-50-9. ill. en noir et en coul., couv. ill.; 29 cm. (BnF no FRBNF412817792)
- Lombard, Michel (2011). Les diablotins du pensionnat, récit [Imps of boarding school, story] (in French). Portet-sur-Garonne: Loubatières. ISBN 978-2-86266-638-9. couv. ill.; 21 cm. (BnF no FRBNF42392658k)
- Teyssèdre-Jullian, Émily; Smith-Vaniz, Thomas (2001). Rodez de A à Z [Rodez A to Z] (in French). Saint-Cyr-sur-Loire: A. Sutton. ISBN 978-2-8138-0331-3. ISSN 1773-6951. ill. en noir et en coul., couv. ill. en coul.; 24 cm. (BnF no FRBNF42434972c)
- Belser, Christophe (2012). Rodez [Rodez] (in French). Prahecq: P & M, Patrimoines médias. ISBN 978-2-36459-008-3. ISSN 1956-5917. ill. en noir et en coul., couv. ill.; 27 x 30 cm. (BnF no FRBNF42802950n)
