= La Bastide-l'Évêque =

Part of Le Bas Ségala in Occitanie, France

- Part of Le Bas Ségala
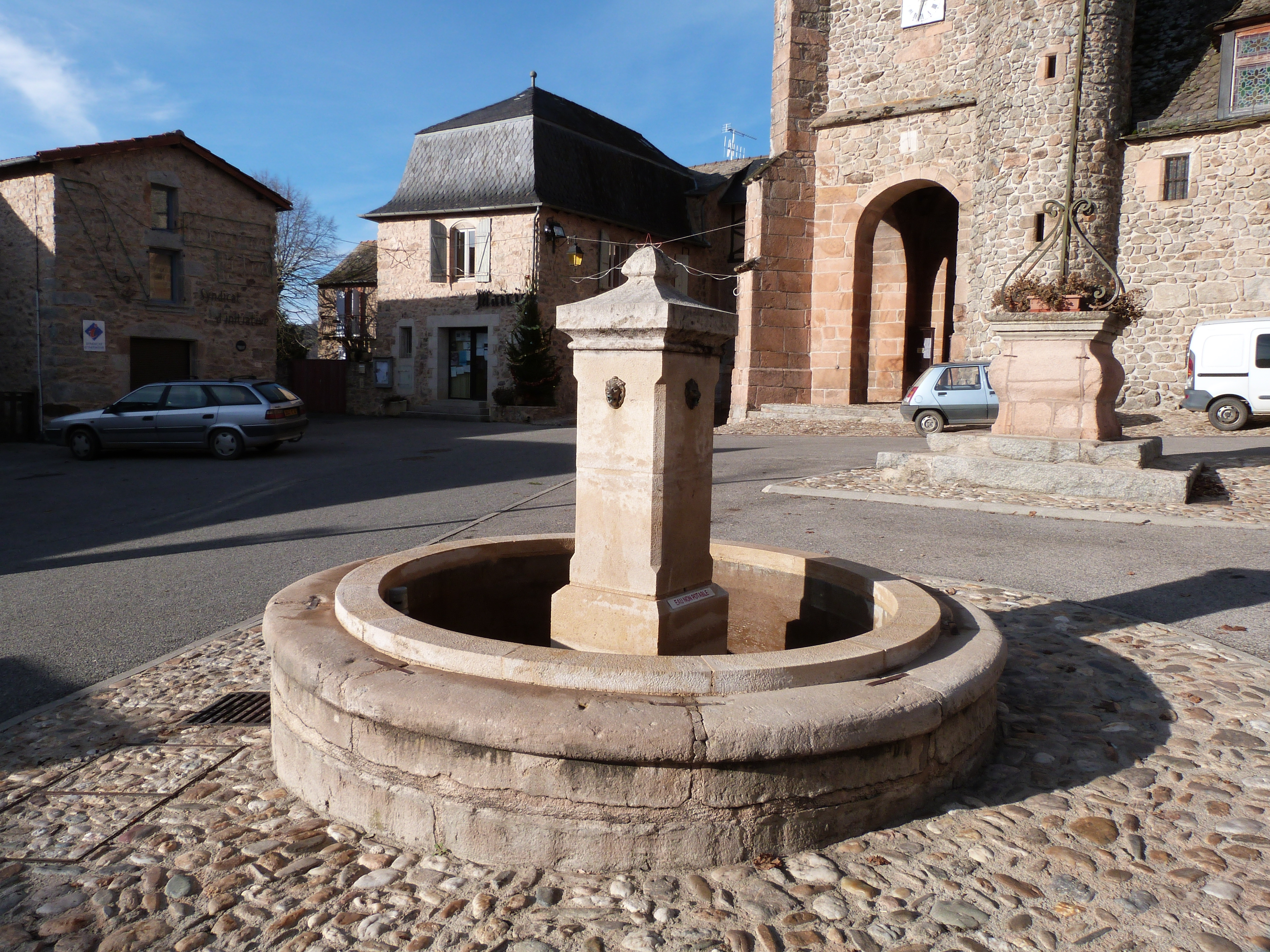
- The Fountain in the main Square

- Coat of arms
- Location of La Bastide-l'Évêque
- Location within France Location within Occitanie
- Coordinates: 44°20′29″N 2°08′07″E
- Country: France
- Region: Occitania
- Department: Aveyron
- Arrondissement: Villefranche-de-Rouergue
- Canton: Aveyron et Tarn
- Commune: Le Bas Ségala
- Area^{1}: 44.16 km^{2} (17.05 sq mi)
- Elevation: 470 m (1,540 ft)
- Highest elevation: 713 m (2,339 ft)
- Lowest elevation: 280 m (920 ft)
- Population (2023): 762
  - Density: 17.3/km^{2} (44.7/sq mi)
- Time zone: UTC+01:00 (CET)
  - Summer (DST): UTC+02:00 (CEST)
- Postal code: 12200
- ^{1} French Land Register data, which excludes lakes, ponds, glaciers > 1 km^{2} (0.386 sq mi or 247 acres) and river estuaries.

La Bastide-l'Évêque (French pronunciation: [la bastid levɛk]; Languedocien: La Bastida de l'Avesque) is a former commune in the Aveyron department in the Occitanie region of southern France. On 1 January 2016, it was merged into the new commune of Le Bas Ségala.

== Geography ==
La Bastide-l'Évêque is located some 5 km east of Villefranche-de-Rouergue and 20 km south by south-west of Decazeville. Access to the commune is by the D911 which comes from Villefranche-de-Rouergue passing along the south-western border of the commune and crossing the narrow neck in the south as it goes east to Rieupeyroux. Access to the village is by the D69 which branches from the D911 on the western commune border and passes through the village continuing east to rejoin the D911 on the eastern border. The D269 goes north from the village then turns west following the northern border and continuing to Villefranche-de-Rouergue. The D905A branches from the D911 in the south of the commune and goes south-east to La Salvetat-Peyralès. Apart from the village the commune has a large number of hamlets:

- Les Aliberts
- Baraque de L'Ortal
- La Baume
- La Bessiêre
- La Bouriette
- Les Cabanelles
- Cabanes
- Les Cabayrols
- Cadour
- Le Cammas
- Capredonde
- Les Cayroux Blancs
- Cazèles
- Combe Nègre
- Les Compans
- Cruorgues
- Fournies
- Le Fraysse
- Galdou
- Gaudiês
- Les Gazanes
- Ginestous
- Lascals
- Laval
- Lonnac
- Maloyre
- Mas de la Borie
- Le Mazuc de Vézis
- Montbressous
- Mousset-Bas
- Moussousse
- L'Ortal
- La Pâle
- Pont du Cayla
- Pouzoulet
- Puech Loup
- La Rangousie
- Réquista
- Le Rieu
- Roumégous
- Le Serayol
- Le Serre
- Teulières
- La Vaysse
- Vézes
- Le Vialardel

The commune is mostly farmland interspersed with a few forests.

The Aveyron river forms most of the northern border as it flows west to eventually join the Tarn at Meauzac. The Lézert flows north through the commune to join the Aveyron on the northern border. The Verlanson also flows north joining the Lézert south of the village. The Ruisseau de Pouzoulet rises near Les Gazanes and also flows north to join the Aveyron. The Ruisseau de Caral rises in the east of the commune and flows north to join the Aveyron.

== Toponymy ==
La Bastide-l'Évêque appears as la Baftide l'Evesque on the 1750 Cassini Map and does not appear at all on the 1790 version although the hamlet of Cadour does.

== History ==
Founded in 1280 by Bishop Raymond de Calmont, La Bastide l'Évêque is one of the five Bastides in western Rouergue with Najac, Sauveterre-de-Rouergue, Villeneuve d'Aveyron, and Villefranche-de-Rouergue. This was the foundation of the Diocese of Rodez on the remains of Morlhon and Faidits to counter the county bastide of Villafranca (Villefranche-de-Rouergue) to limit its population, influence, and development. The bishop granted a charter in 1280 but politically it was a failure and remained a fortified village.

In the 14th century mining was very important with 13 mills called "martinets" operating in the Lézert Valley. They were used to smelt copper and make cauldrons. This activity continued until the end of the 19th century then died for lack of profitability.

=== Heraldry ===
Arms of La Bastide-l'Évêque	Blazon: Azure, a crozier regardant of Or accompanied in chief of the number s 12 to dexter and 80 to sinister the same, debruised by a lion Argent over the stock of the crozier.

== Administration ==
List of Successive Mayors

Mayors from the French Revolution to 1930

From	To	Name
1792	1796	Jean-Jacques Cavanhac
1796	1800	François Rouzies
1800	1812	Jean-Jacques Cavanhac
1812	1843	Jean-Baptiste Dardenne
1843	1848	Hyacinthe Garrigues
1848	1873	Charles Dardenne
1873	1876	Julien Alet
1876	1892	Jean-François Rouzies
1892	1904	Louis Antoine Pachin
1904	1908	Jean-Baptiste Bessou
1908	1912	Célestin Garrigues
1912	1918	Henri Blanc
1918	1930	Léopold Gares

Mayors from 1930

From	To	Name
1930	1945	Théophile Rouzies
1945	1947	Valentin Laval
1947	1962	Firmin Alet
1962	1977	Gaston Lacassagne
1977	2008	André Darres
2008	2016	Jean Eudes le Meignen

== Demography ==
The inhabitants of the commune are known as Episcopois or Episcopoises in French.

Historical population

Year	Pop.	±% p.a.
1793	260	—
1800	368	+5.09%
1806	2,316	+35.88%
1821	2,618	+0.82%
1831	2,899	+1.02%
1836	2,995	+0.65%
1841	2,931	−0.43%
1846	3,433	+3.21%
1851	3,433	+0.00%
1856	3,314	−0.70%
1861	3,355	+0.25%
1866	2,507	−5.66%
1872	2,559	+0.34%
1876	2,531	−0.27%
1881	2,560	+0.23%
1886	2,559	−0.01%
1891	2,380	−1.44%
1896	2,287	−0.79%

Year	Pop.	±% p.a.
1901	2,362	+0.65%
1906	2,074	−2.57%
1911	2,062	−0.12%
1921	1,596	−2.53%
1926	1,593	−0.04%
1931	1,546	−0.60%
1936	1,518	−0.36%
1946	1,408	−0.75%
1954	1,318	−0.82%
1962	1,223	−0.93%
1968	1,132	−1.28%
1975	964	−2.27%
1982	982	+0.26%
1990	921	−0.80%
1999	882	−0.48%
2007	822	−0.88%
2012	826	+0.10%
2023	762	−0.73%

Source: EHESS and INSEE

== Economy ==
The commune is mostly rural with many farms whose business ranges from cattle breeding but mostly sheep. Many tradesmen reside or work in the commune. Some people have chosen to settle in the commune but their occupation is in neighbouring towns like Villefranche-de-Rouergue or Rieupeyroux.

== Culture and heritage ==
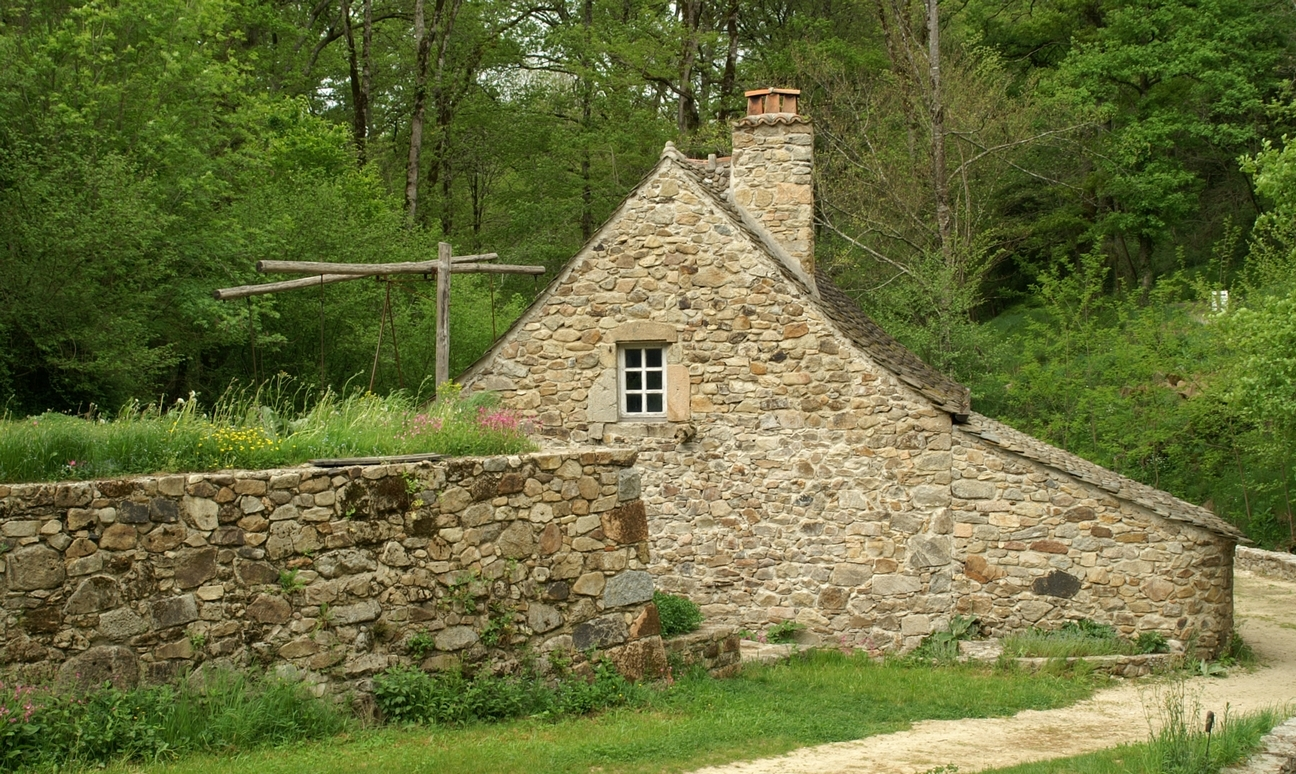
The Martinet de la Ramonde

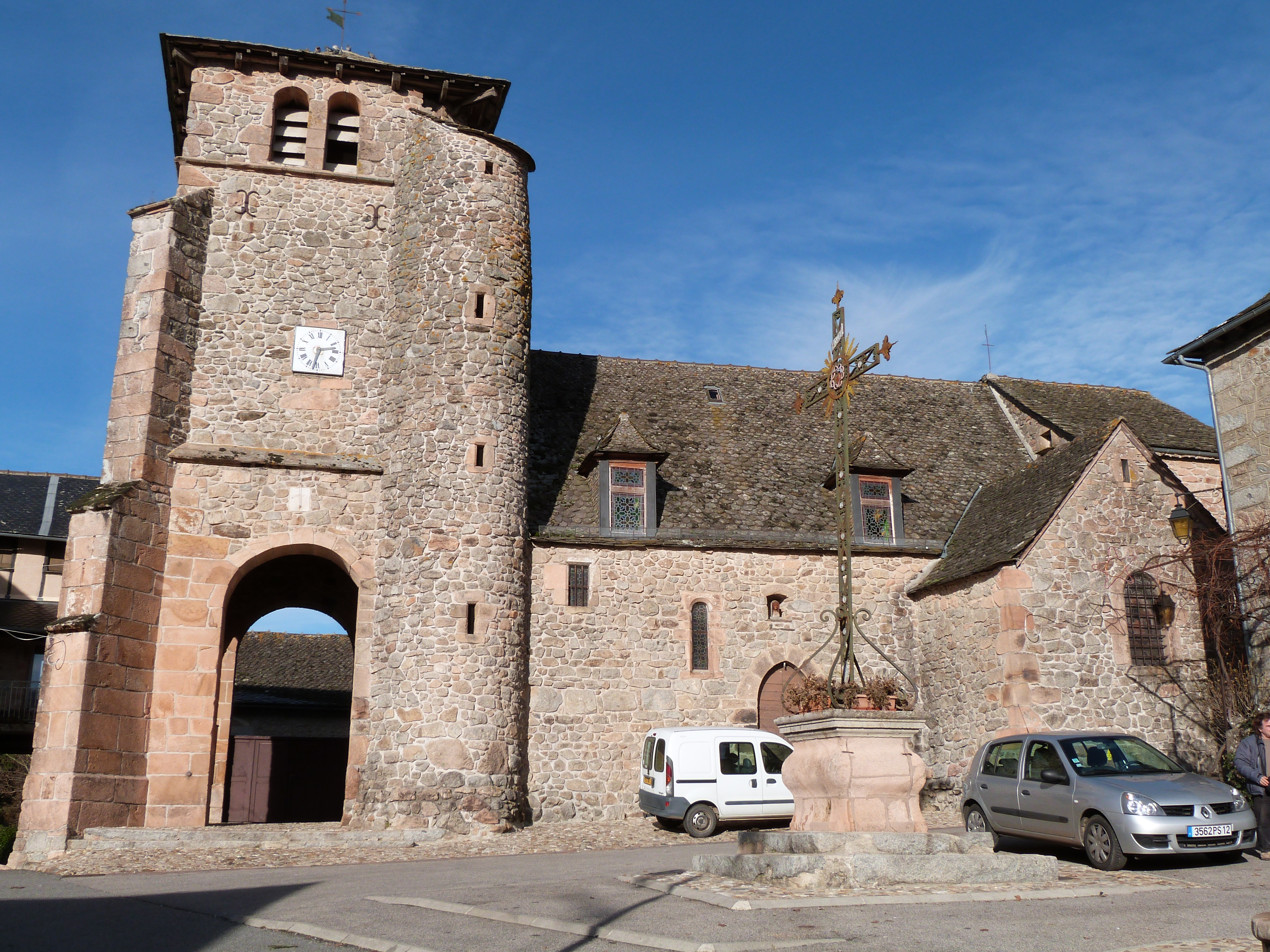
The Church of Saint John the Baptist

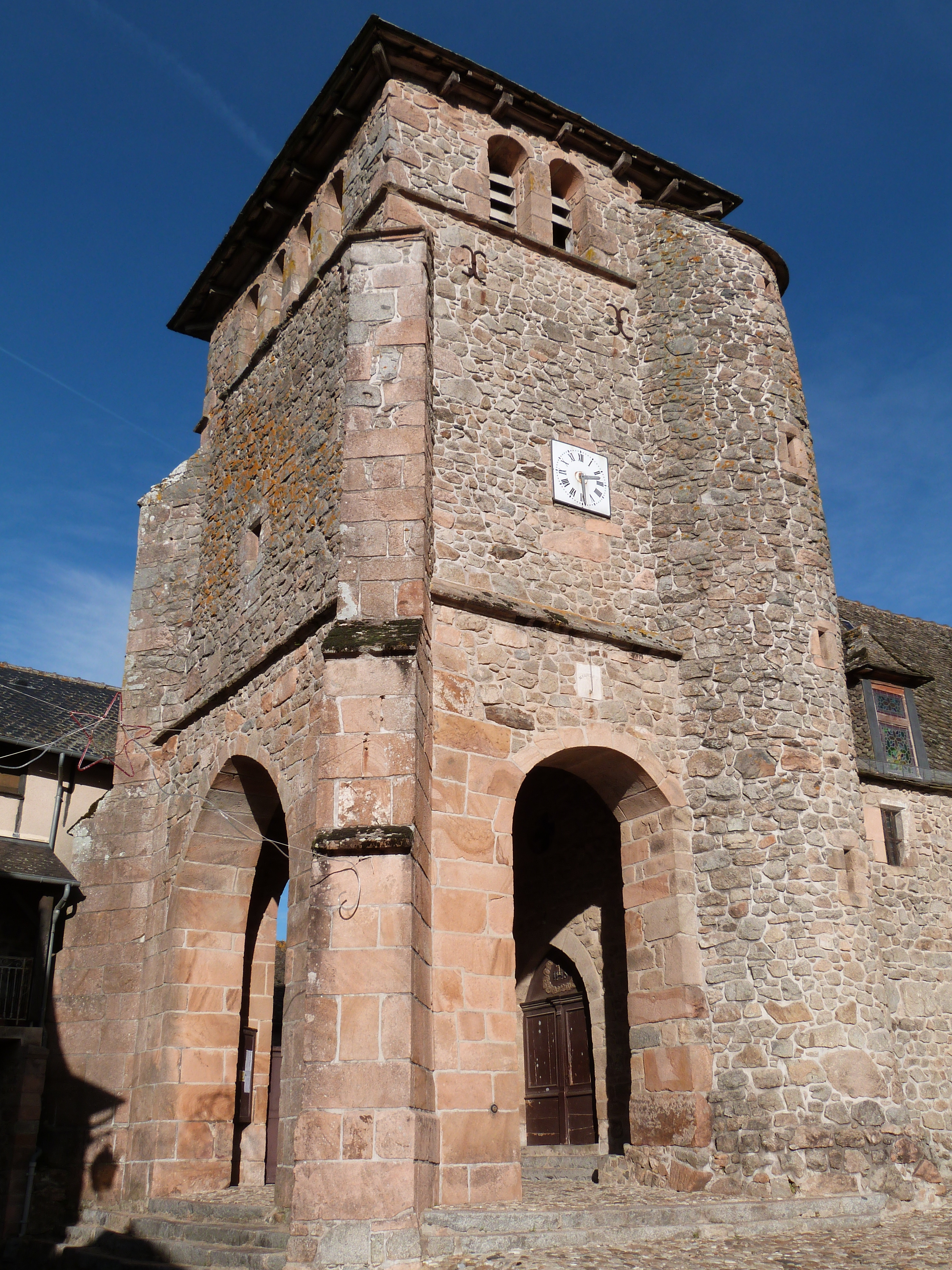
The gate tower on the church

=== Civil heritage ===
- A Gallo-Roman Bridge at Cayla
- The Tower of Cayla
- The Château de Villelongue at Cabanes. A former fief that belonged to the Adhémar de Monteil family then to the Raffin family
- The Martinet de la Ramonde
- The Chateau de Réquista (1630) is registered as an historical monument.

The Chateau de Réquista Picture Gallery

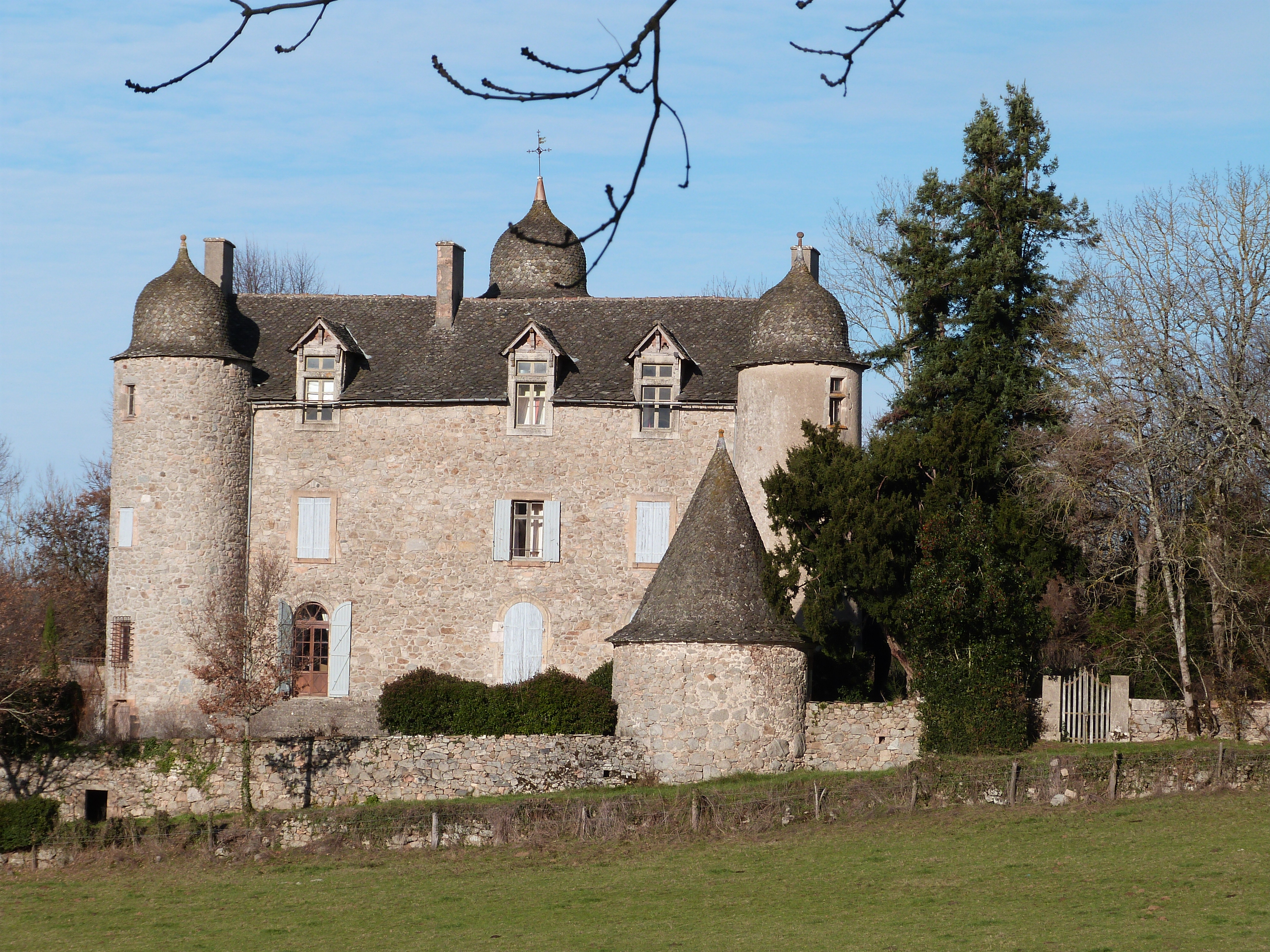
The southern side of the Chateau

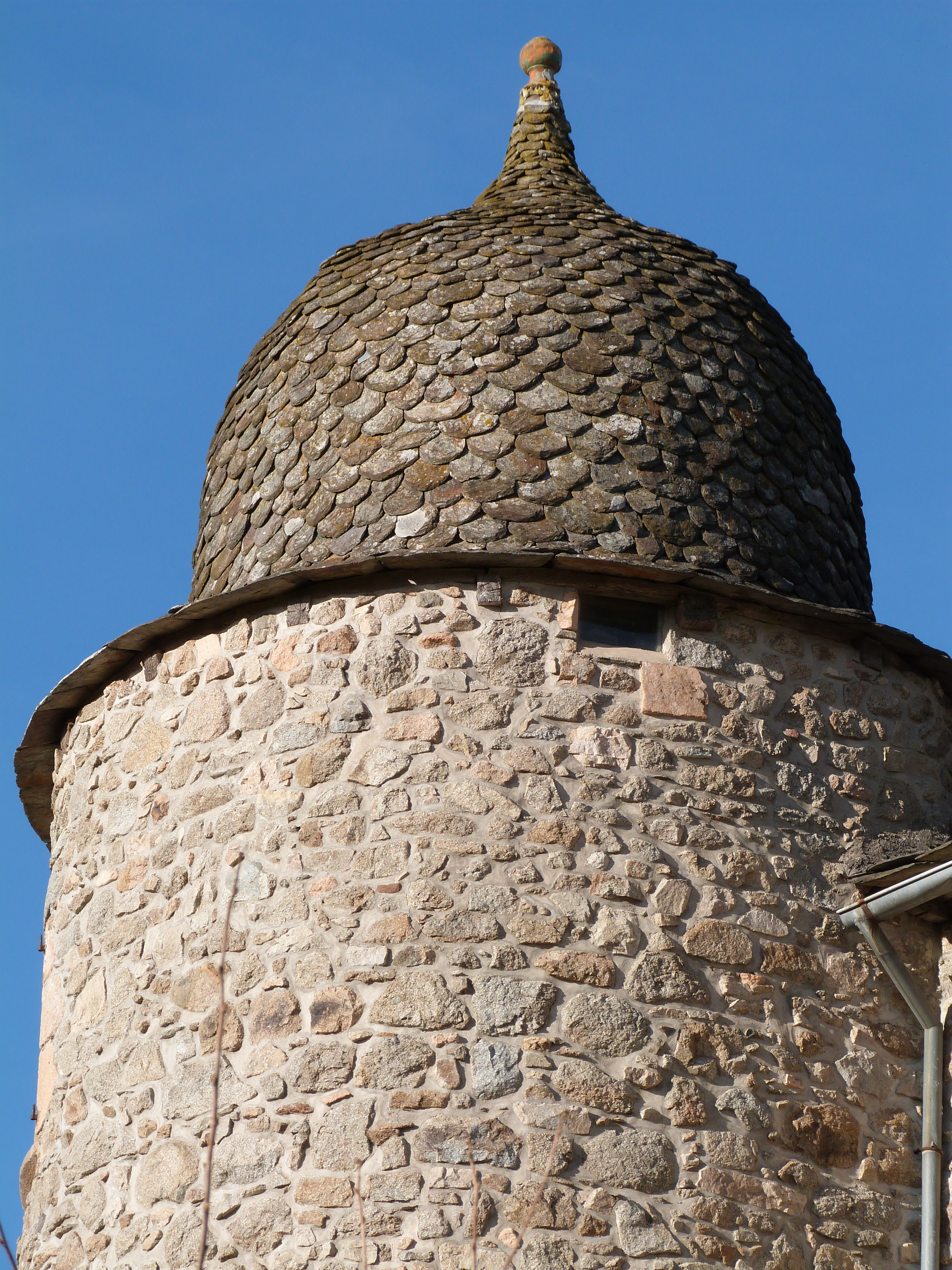
The Chateau Tower

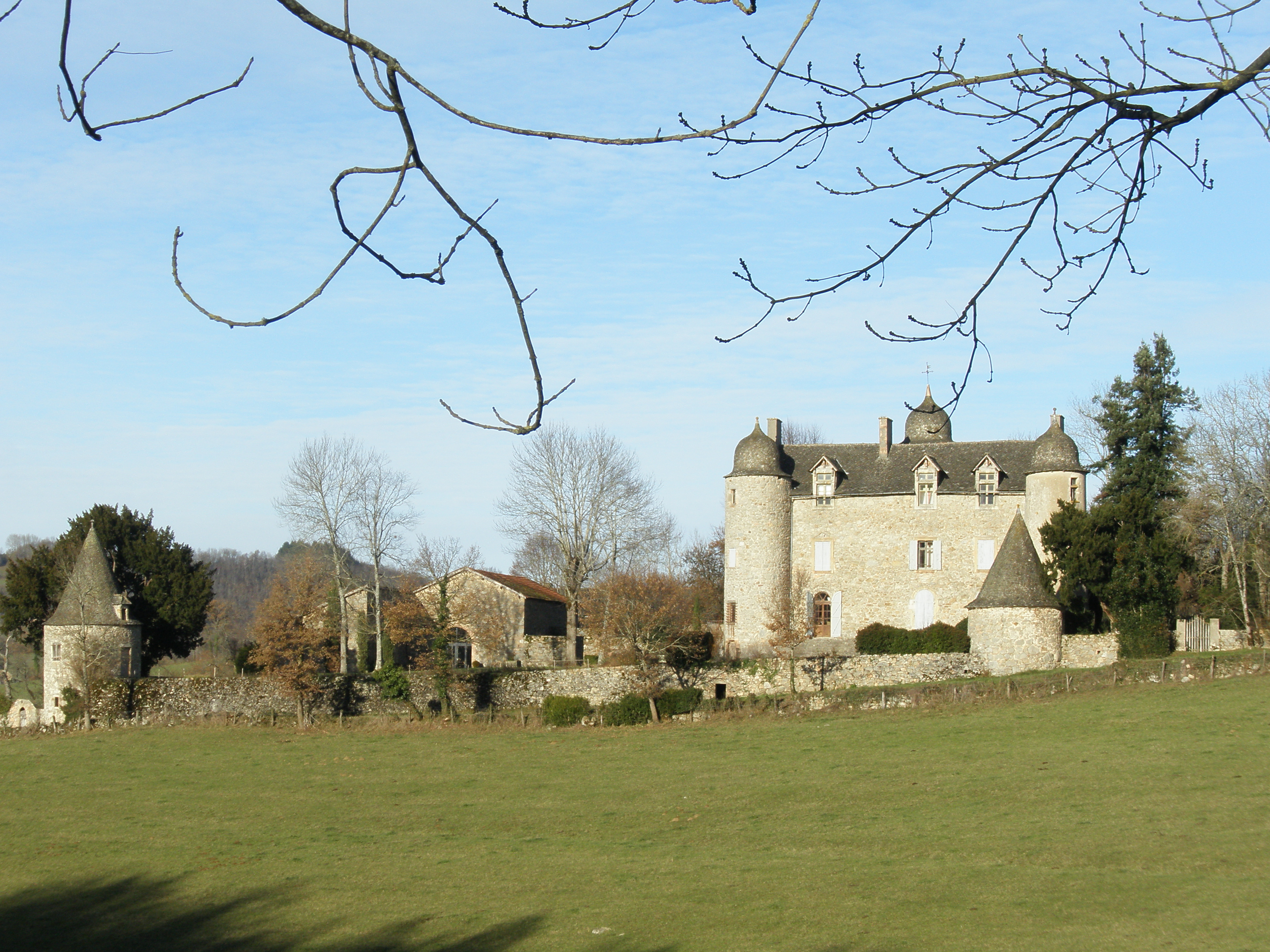
The grounds of the Chateau

=== Religious heritage ===
- The Church of Saint John the Baptist, a Romanesque Church from the 13th and 14th century with an imposing gate tower

== Notable people linked to the commune ==
- Pierre Poujade, politician, died at La Bastide-l'Évêque on 27 August 2003.

== Bibliography ==
- Christian-Pierre Bedel, preface by Pierre Marty, Riu-Peirós, La Bastida-de-l'Evesque, La Capèla-Bleis, Previnquièiras, Sent-Sauvador, Vabre-Tisac / Christian-Pierre Bedel e los estatjants del canton de Riu-Peiros, Rodez, Mission départementale de la culture, 1999, Al canton, 304 pages, ill., cov. ill. 28 cm, ISBN 2-907279-42-4, ISSN 1151-8375, BnF 37078683w (in Occitan)

== See also ==
- Communes of the Aveyron department
