= Pigüé =

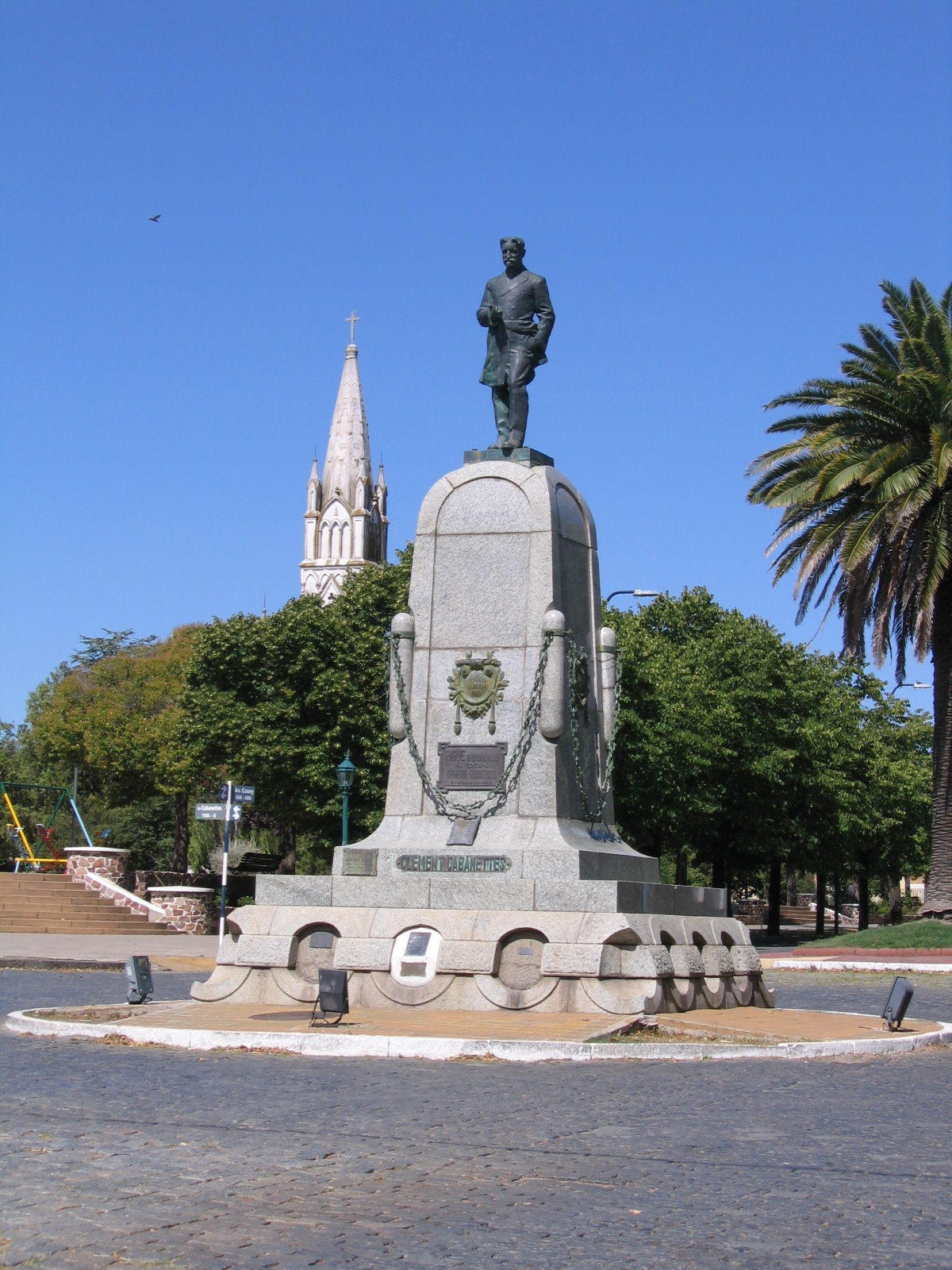

- Location in Argentina
- Coordinates: 37°37′S 62°25′W
- Country: Argentina
- Province: Buenos Aires
- Partido: Saavedra
- Founded: December 4, 1884
- Founders: Cabanettes & Casey
- Elevation: 293 m (961 ft)

Population (2001 census [INDEC])
  - Total: 13,822
- CPA Base: B 8170
- Area code: +54 2923

Pigüé (Spanish pronunciation: [piˈɣwe]) is a town in Argentina located in the Pampas, 584 km (363 mi) south-west of Buenos Aires. It was founded by 165 Occitan-speaking French immigrants from Aveyron (Avairon in occitan) and one Argentine of direct Irish descent on December 4, 1884. The urban population is now 13,822 (INDEC 2001) and has increased by 9.5% since the 1991 census. Pigüé is the administrative centre of Saavedra Partido, Buenos Aires Province.

== History ==
=== A brief account ===
Pigüé, Pi-Hue, which means gathering place in Mapuche tongue, is home to an Occitan-speaking community coming from Rouergue, Occitania. It is located where two chains of hills meet, the Cura Malal to the west and the Bravard to the east. But Pigüé would never exist as a town were it not for Clément Cabanettes, a man born in 1851 in the small village of Ambec, commune of Lassouts near Saint-Côme (Sant Còsme d'Òlt en occitan) in the southern French département of Aveyron (Avairon). Cabanettes, then 33 of age, organized the voluntary exile of forty poverty-stricken farming families (as in "groups of relatives") from the surrounding communes of Espalion, Gabriac, Naucelle, Aurelle and Saint-Geniez-d'Olt (Sent Ginièis d'Òlt), to name but a few, to South America.

Having left Rodez (Rodés in occitan), the préfecture of Aveyron, by train on October 23, 1884 and reached the city of Buenos Aires, Argentina on a combined steam- and sailing-ship called Belgrano from Bordeaux (October 25) some 38 days later, they arrived at the brand-new railway station of what would become Pigüé on December 3, 1884. The "Aveyron colony", reminiscent of the Mayflower, subsequently welcomed more immigrants from the Rodez area and eventually became, after a very unlucky and ruinous start, one of the most prosperous settlements in the Pampas. Around 20,000 people now live in and around Pigüé, in the Buenos Aires district of Saavedra.

=== Background and preparation ===
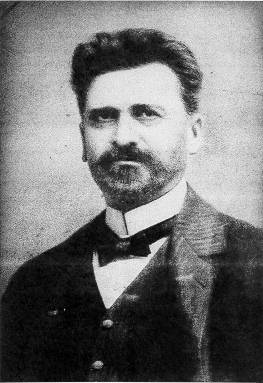
Clément Cabanettes

Second Lieutenant Cabanettes had initially travelled to Buenos Aires in 1879 where he'd been hired to drill Argentine troops. In the following year he started the first telephone company in the country, "El Pan Teléfono" (sometimes also "La Pantelefónica"), before resigning for mutual incompatibility with the board. He then moved to Olavarría and worked in the wheat-harvesting machinery business. That is when he thought of bringing fellow countrypeople from Aveyron to the Pigüé area where he'd just bought 270 square kilometres of land, which the Government of the Buenos Aires Province had sold him for a derisory sum in recognition of his services. Cabanettes instantly fell in love with the place: it reminded him of his native Aubrac. With the financial help and persuasive know-how of his friend Eduardo Casey, Cabanettes managed to have the Pigüé station added to the planned railway line of Ferro Carril Sud. They also had accommodation and a huge silo built for the future settlers, plus a well dug.

Cabanettes returned to Aveyron where his friend François Issaly had already started promoting the Pigüé colony, offering each settler two square kilometres of land to cultivate for the next six years on condition that they gave half of their harvest to the community. At the end of this trial period, the settler would receive a title deed, whatever the value of the crops they'd shared over the six years. All the settlers were asked was a 5,000-franc contribution for the purchase of cattle, seeds and machines, but it turned out that many actually never paid the full price, which left Cabanettes even more indebted to Casey, whom he had borrowed money from. Given that unemployment was rife in and around Rodez following massive job cuts in the Decazeville mining industries, overpopulated rural areas and the phylloxera crisis (1882-1890), Cabanettes's idea aroused some interest. Meanwhile, the Aveyron press grew hostile to Cabanettes's project, accusing "the adventurer" of exploiting poor people's misery and painting in glowing colours a most dangerous place full of ferocious and vicious exotic beasts.

=== First steps in the promised land ===
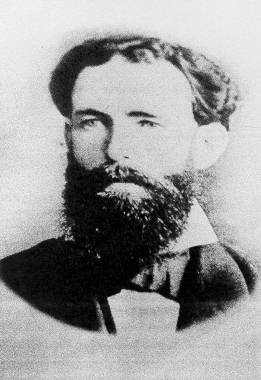
Eduardo Casey

Despite these initial difficulties, the 163 colonists, who also comprised a teacher, a blacksmith, a cartwright, a priest and a tradesman, were found and brought to Pigüé where they enthusiastically started cultivating the land, although the first harvest of wheat was quite disappointing. The farming techniques were obviously the ones used back home in Aveyron but these were not the best option with much different climate, relief and soil. The second year was even worse, with drought from the month of March through September. Some sowed maize and potatoes on top of the corn, fearing nothing would come out at all. However, heavy rains fell in autumn, which proved enough for all crops to grow, providing for a mediocre harvest. Still, the settlers kept the faith and none returned to France. On the contrary, more arrived. "The promised land" was well worth the sacrifices, according to letters they sent to their relatives. "Monsieur Cabanettes cannot be accused of promising more butter than bread".

On the third year though, finding himself unable to repay Casey as planned, Cabanettes asked and obtained a twelve-month extension of due date. But this was not enough for Pigüé to make profits and Casey first decided, as his contract allowed him to, to repossess all land but eventually changed his mind and chose to grant Cabanettes an extra 50,000 pesos instead, thus wiping his friend's slate clean. The whole colony, facing growing difficulties despite breeding more bovine cattle than sheep now, turned out to be a complete failure and the Government of Buenos Aires finally bought back the settlement at the price of naked land, ignoring the buildings and crops, and leaving Cabanettes with no benefits and glory. Cabanettes and Casey died even poorer than the families they saved and gave back hope to but their generosity and blind perseverance ensured that Pigüé remains to this day a grateful piece of Aveyron in South America.

== Climate ==
Climate data for Pigüé (1991–2020, extremes 1961–present)
Month	Jan	Feb	Mar	Apr	May	Jun	Jul	Aug	Sep	Oct	Nov	Dec	Year
Record high °C (°F)	40.0 (104.0)	37.6 (99.7)	36.0 (96.8)	33.8 (92.8)	28.6 (83.5)	24.0 (75.2)	23.0 (73.4)	30.8 (87.4)	30.5 (86.9)	35.4 (95.7)	35.7 (96.3)	39.9 (103.8)	40.0 (104.0)
Mean daily maximum °C (°F)	28.9 (84.0)	27.6 (81.7)	24.8 (76.6)	20.1 (68.2)	15.8 (60.4)	12.7 (54.9)	11.8 (53.2)	14.6 (58.3)	17.0 (62.6)	19.9 (67.8)	24.0 (75.2)	27.8 (82.0)	20.4 (68.7)
Daily mean °C (°F)	21.5 (70.7)	20.2 (68.4)	17.9 (64.2)	13.5 (56.3)	9.9 (49.8)	7.0 (44.6)	6.1 (43.0)	8.1 (46.6)	10.4 (50.7)	13.5 (56.3)	17.0 (62.6)	20.3 (68.5)	13.8 (56.8)
Mean daily minimum °C (°F)	14.3 (57.7)	13.3 (55.9)	11.6 (52.9)	8.0 (46.4)	5.1 (41.2)	2.1 (35.8)	1.2 (34.2)	2.6 (36.7)	4.3 (39.7)	7.3 (45.1)	10.0 (50.0)	12.7 (54.9)	7.7 (45.9)
Record low °C (°F)	1.2 (34.2)	0.4 (32.7)	−2.6 (27.3)	−6.0 (21.2)	−6.6 (20.1)	−10.5 (13.1)	−12.2 (10.0)	−8.0 (17.6)	−7.2 (19.0)	−4.2 (24.4)	−2.5 (27.5)	0.5 (32.9)	−12.2 (10.0)
Average precipitation mm (inches)	81.2 (3.20)	101.2 (3.98)	95.8 (3.77)	72.3 (2.85)	43.1 (1.70)	24.5 (0.96)	31.5 (1.24)	34.4 (1.35)	59.7 (2.35)	94.0 (3.70)	93.4 (3.68)	87.3 (3.44)	818.4 (32.22)
Average precipitation days (≥ 0.1 mm)	8.1	7.4	7.5	6.7	6.4	6.1	6.0	5.5	7.0	9.4	8.8	8.4	87.4
Average snowy days	0.0	0.0	0.0	0.0	0.1	0.1	0.3	0.1	0.1	0.0	0.0	0.0	0.5
Average relative humidity (%)	60.3	65.0	71.2	73.5	78.9	77.8	76.1	70.0	68.4	68.3	62.9	57.1	69.1
Mean monthly sunshine hours	300.7	268.8	238.7	201.0	170.5	129.0	136.4	189.1	195.0	232.5	267.0	275.9	2,604.6
Percentage possible sunshine	67	70	60	60	53	45	45	56	55	57	62	60	58
Source 1: Servicio Meteorológico Nacional
Source 2: NOAA (sun 1961–1990) UNLP (May sun only)

== The founding 166 ==
There follows a list of all 165 founding settlers from Aveyron, to which must be added Eduardo Casey (37), an Argentine born of Irish parents in 1847 and friend of Cabanettes's, without whose financial and moral support Pigüé would never have come to be:

- Ambec:
  - Clément Cabanettes (aged 33);
  - Sylvain Cabanettes (28) and his wife Marie (26);
  - Sylvie Cabanettes (19) and Clémence (17)
- Arvieu:
  - Auguste Cransac;
  - Amans Verdier (25), his wife Rosalie (23) and their daughter Germaine (1)
- Aurelle-Verlac:
  - Alexandre Bras (51), his wife Émilie (41) and their six children Julie (18), who was the first school teacher in Pigüé, Émilie (17), Denis (15), Léon (10), Alexandre (6) and Berthe (4)
- Bozouls:
  - Joseph Brouzes (24)
- Campuac:
  - Louis Delport (38)
- Castelmary:
  - Antoine Blanc (42), his wife Émilie (32) and their daughter Léontine (5)
- Coubisou:
  - Jean-Marie Serp (27);
  - Mr Vassal
- Coussergues:
  - Jean Viguié (28)
- Espalion:
  - Jean-Pierre Arlabosse (18);
  - Augustin Champredonde (30), his wife Lucie (20) and their son Augustin (2);
  - Eugène Girbal (16);
  - Jean Guizard (24)
- Gabriac:
  - Bertrand Blazy (33), his wife Julie (33) and their three children Clément (5), Joseph (3) and Alphonse (1);
  - Basile Boucays (41);
  - François Gay (45) and his wife Françoise (55);
  - Casimir Ponssié (20)
- Gramont:
  - Victor Couderc (27)
- Lassouts:
  - Alexis Domergue (46), the priest
- Livinhac-le-Haut:
  - Adrien Soulages (36), his wife Rose (36) and their four children Marie (13), Victor (8), Léontine (6) and Justine (2)
- Montrozier:
  - Joseph Ferrand (44), his wife Julie (33) and their four children Joseph (11), François (9), Henri (5) and Marie (2)
- Moyrazès:
  - Amans Ginestet (27)
- Naucelle:
  - Joseph Dellac (15);
  - Auguste Fraysse (25) and his wife Marie (24);
  - Louis Lacombe (19)
- Nauviale:
  - Charles Causse (41) and his wife Marie (29);
  - Germain Savy (22)
- Prades-Salars:
  - François Gay (not the François Gay from Gabriac)
- Rieupeyroux:
  - Adrien Couffin (29)
- Rodez:
  - Justin Calmels (17)
  - Adrien Garabuau (23)
  - François Roubellac (19)
- Saint-Christophe-Vallon:
  - Arthémon Viala (52), his wife Marie (36) and their seven children Léonie (19), Casimir (16), Albine (12), Marie (7), Anaïs (6), Aurélie (5) and Charles (2)
- Saint-Côme-d'Olt:
  - Lucien Cabanettes (36), his wife Lucie (29) and their daughter Sylvie (6);
  - Auguste Mathat (22)
- Saint-Cyprien-sur-Dourdou:
  - Julien Girou (22) and his wife Eulalie (22);
  - Marie Girou (54) and her son Pierre (16);
  - Pierre Mazars (25)
- Sainte-Juliette:
  - Pierre Alauzet (25)
- Saint-Félix-de-Lunel:
  - Marc Issaly (19);
  - Valentin Issaly (63) and his two sons François (32), Cabanettes's friend, and Augustin (16)
- Saint-Geniez-d'Olt:
  - Hippolyte Vigouroux (24)
- Saint-Parthem:
  - Julien Cadrieu (20)
- Sanvensa:
  - Augustin Segond (28), his wife Catherine (27) and their son Frédéric (2)
- Trémouilles:
  - Jean Ferrière (40)
- Villefranche-de-Rouergue:
  - Nicolas Alric (31) and his wife Antoinette (25);
  - Jean-Baptiste Lagarrigue (25)
- Vimenet:
  - Auguste Suau (40), his wife Rosalie (36) and their six children Augustin (14), Xavier (11), Marie (10), Sylvie (7), Joséphine (5) and Albert (2)
- Voltach:
  - Émile Boudou (21)
- Vors, now Baraqueville:
  - Eugène Galtier (29);
  - Rose Galtier (43) and her three children Joseph (20), Rémy (11) and Céline (7)
- Undefined origin in Aveyron:
  - Jacques Andrieu (36);
  - Prosper Arvieu (29);
  - Guillaume Avit (43), his wife Marie (43) and their five children Camille (17), Pierre (11), Jules (7), Marie (3) and Augustine (3 months);
  - Lerin Bergonier (28);
  - Pierre Bouillac (40);
  - Auguste Boyer (26);
  - Firmin Cancé (22);
  - Joseph Cayrade (25);
  - Louis Chauvet (45);
  - Adolphe Couly (19);
  - Cyprien Cussac (25);
  - Félix Delbrolle (30);
  - Henri Delmas (21);
  - Achille Dides (18);
  - Philippe Ducasse (30);
  - Hector Dulong (17);
  - Firmin Durand (38), his wife Eugénie (44) and their four children Édouard (14), Théophile (11), Adrien (10) and Numa (5);
  - Joseph Galtier, his wife and two children;
  - Marcel Galtier and his wife Victorine;
  - Sylvain Gastal (36), his wife Augustine (34) and their son Fernand (1);
  - Antoine Gaubert (40);
  - Honoré Lacombe (38) and his wife Félicie (26);
  - Céline Laffont (25);
  - Pierre Lalanne (33);
  - Raymond Laplace (36);
  - Germain Loustalot (17);
  - Victor Merviel (24);
  - Auguste Moisset (38), his wife Victorine (29) and their daughter Marie (4);
  - Eugène Persec (23);
  - Jules Rey (35);
  - Adrien Salères (19);
  - Victor Soulier (30)

In short:

- 115 males (69%) and 50 females (31%);
- 102 adults (62%) and 63 minors of 20 (38%);
- Average age: 24 years and 9 months;
- Average male age: 28 years and 1 month;
- Average female age: 20 years and 8 months;
- 51 singles (50% of adults);
- 24 couples, two widows and one widower (50% of adults);
- 24 teenagers (14%);
- 39 children (24%)

== See also ==
- Pigüé Airport
