= Saint-Salvadou =

Part of Le Bas Ségala in Occitanie, France

- Part of Le Bas Ségala
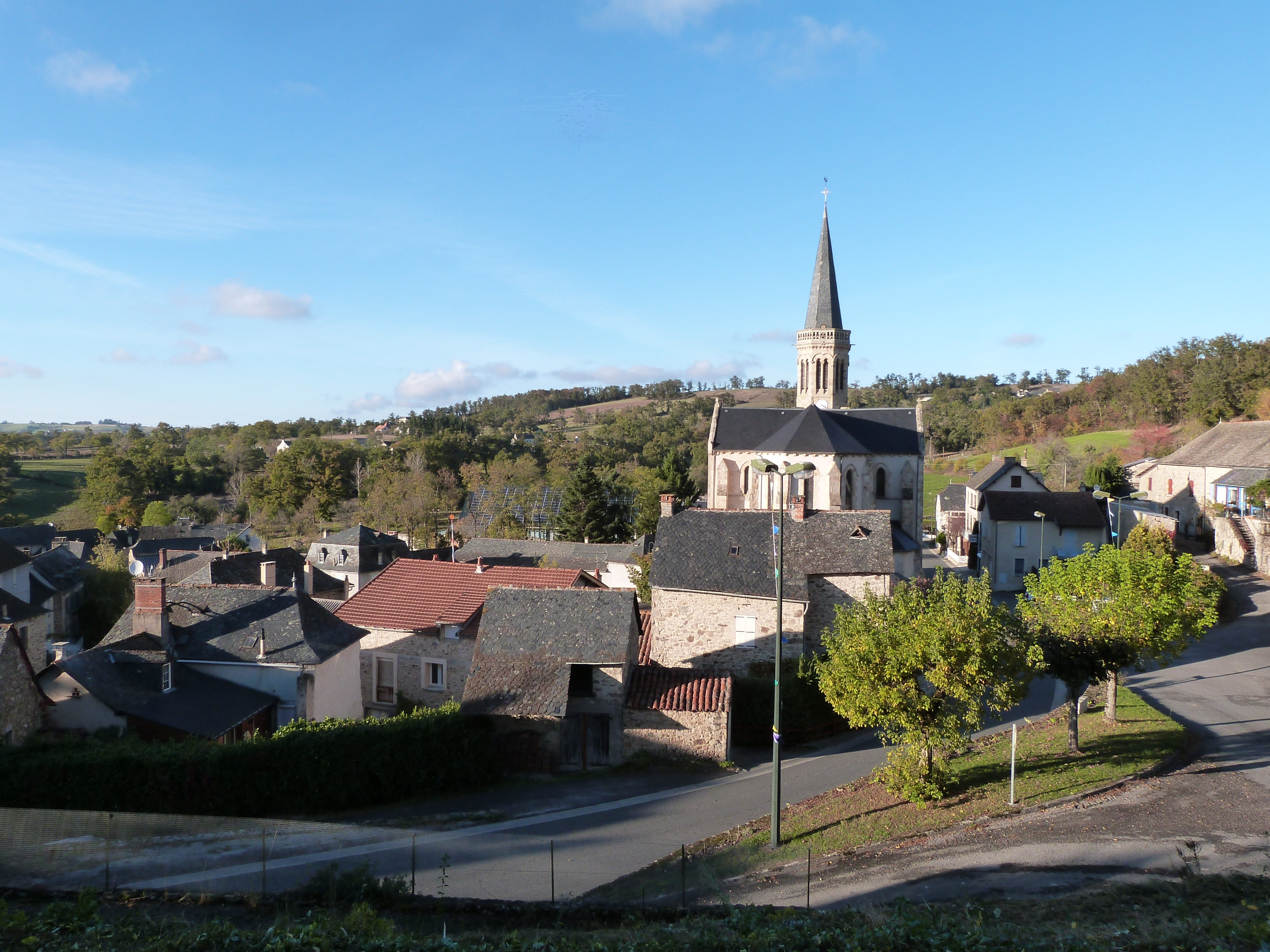
- The church and surrounding buildings in Saint-Salvadou
- Location of Saint-Salvadou
- Location within France Location within Occitanie
- Coordinates: 44°16′55″N 2°06′06″E
- Country: France
- Region: Occitania
- Department: Aveyron
- Arrondissement: Villefranche-de-Rouergue
- Canton: Aveyron et Tarn
- Commune: Le Bas Ségala
- Area^{1}: 15.5 km^{2} (6.0 sq mi)
- Elevation: 460 m (1,510 ft)
- Highest elevation: 610 m (2,000 ft)
- Lowest elevation: 369 m (1,211 ft)
- Population (2023): 395
  - Density: 25.5/km^{2} (66.0/sq mi)
- Time zone: UTC+01:00 (CET)
  - Summer (DST): UTC+02:00 (CEST)
- Postal code: 12200
- ^{1} French Land Register data, which excludes lakes, ponds, glaciers > 1 km^{2} (0.386 sq mi or 247 acres) and river estuaries.

Saint-Salvadou (French pronunciation: [sɛ̃ salvadu]; Languedocien: Sent Sauvador) is a former commune in the Aveyron department in southern France. On 1 January 2016, it was merged into the new commune of Le Bas Ségala.

== See also ==
- Communes of the Aveyron department
