= Vabre-Tizac =

Part of Le Bas Ségala in Occitanie, France

- Part of Le Bas Ségala
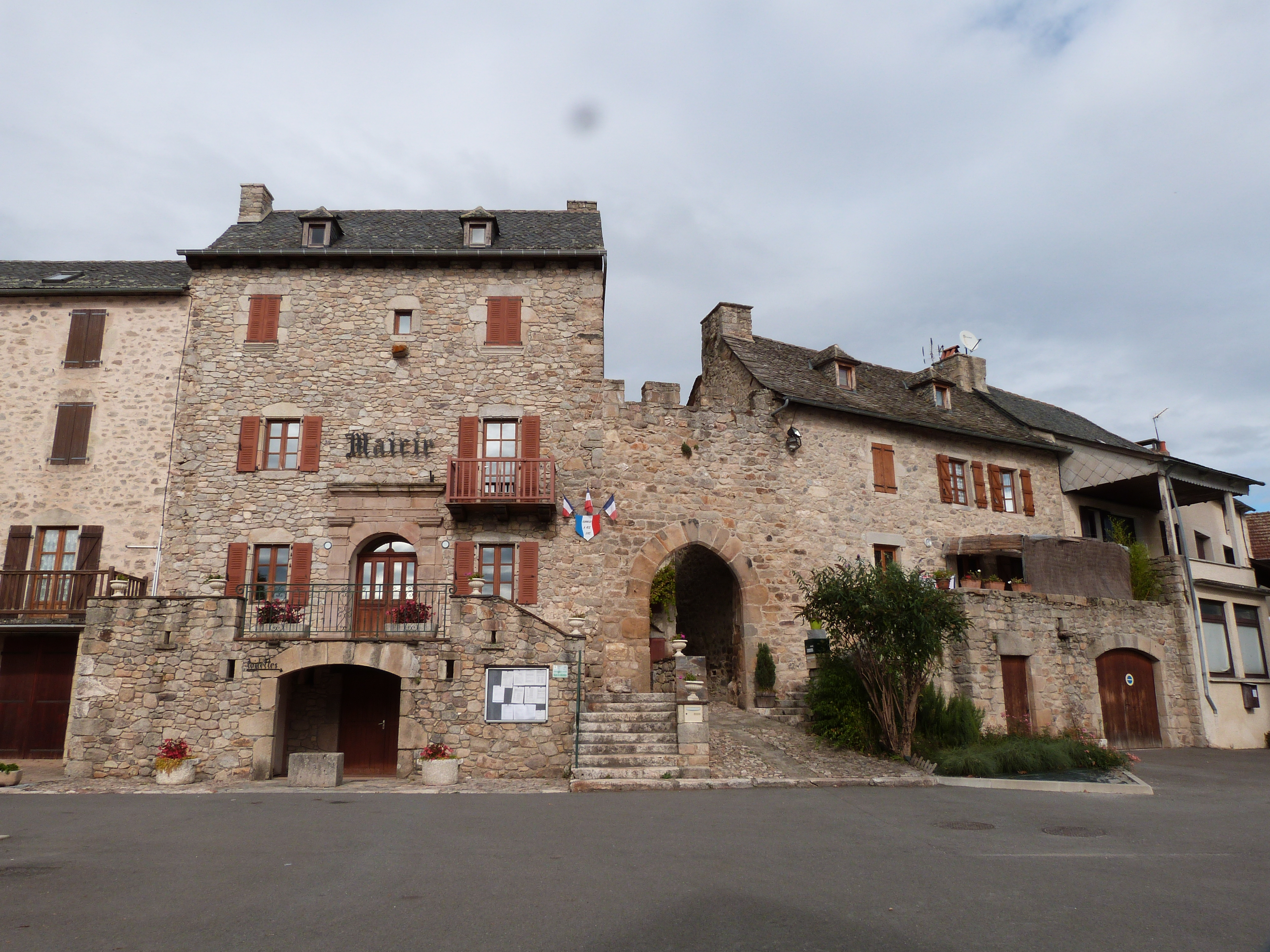
- The town hall in Vabre-Tizac

- Coat of arms
- Location of Vabre-Tizac
- Location within France Location within Occitanie
- Coordinates: 44°16′18″N 2°09′02″E
- Country: France
- Region: Occitania
- Department: Aveyron
- Arrondissement: Villefranche-de-Rouergue
- Canton: Aveyron et Tarn
- Commune: Le Bas Ségala
- Area^{1}: 22.67 km^{2} (8.75 sq mi)
- Elevation: 470 m (1,540 ft)
- Highest elevation: 607 m (1,991 ft)
- Lowest elevation: 353 m (1,158 ft)
- Population (2023): 451
  - Density: 19.9/km^{2} (51.5/sq mi)
- Time zone: UTC+01:00 (CET)
  - Summer (DST): UTC+02:00 (CEST)
- Postal code: 12240
- ^{1} French Land Register data, which excludes lakes, ponds, glaciers > 1 km^{2} (0.386 sq mi or 247 acres) and river estuaries.

Vabre-Tizac (French pronunciation: [vabʁ tizak]; Languedocien: Vabre e Tisac) is a former commune in the Aveyron department in the Occitanie region in southern France. On 1 January 2016, it was merged into the new commune of Le Bas Ségala.

== See also ==
- Communes of the Aveyron department
