= Eduardo Casey =

Argentine landowner (1847–1906)

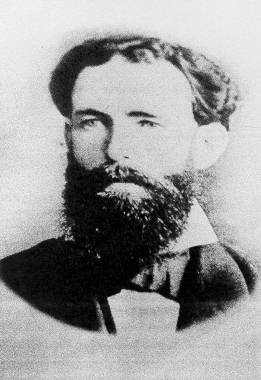

Personal details
- Born: 1847 Lobos, Buenos Aires,
- Died: 1906 (aged 58–59) Buenos Aires, Argentina
- Occupation: Landowner entrepreneur

Eduardo Casey (April 20, 1847 – July 23, 1906), was an Argentine landowner of Irish descent. In 1880 he purchased 1,700 square miles (4,400 km^{2}) of land in Santa Fe Province and founded there the present-day city of Venado Tuerto, named after a one-eyed deer that alerted early settlers to attacks by local Indians. He also helped in the founding and funding of the Argentine town of Pigüé, Saavedra in 1884.

He was born in Lobos, Province of Buenos Aires, the son of Lawrence Casey, born in Westmeath, and Mary O'Neill, of Wicklow. He was married to María Inés Gahan, daughter of John Gahan and Mary Devitt, belonging to a family of Irish Catholics.
