= Lunac =

Lunac may refer to:

- Lunac, Aveyron, a commune in the department of Aveyron in France
- Lunac (alloy and trans-ceramic coatings)
- Stearic acid, by trade name Lunac
