= Saavedra, Buenos Aires Province =

Saavedra
- Town
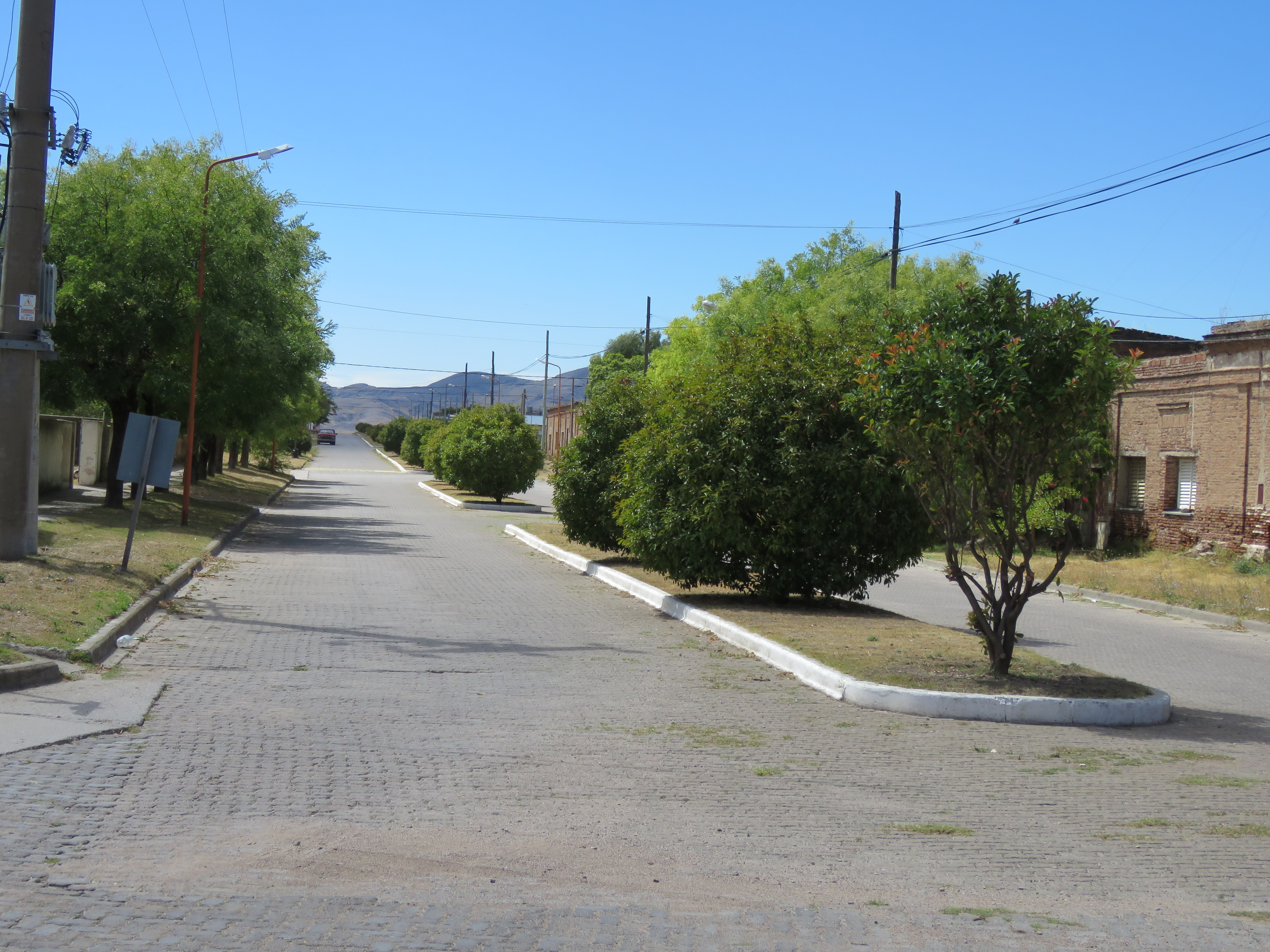
- Road facing toward the mountains

- Location within Buenos Aires Province
- Coordinates: 37°45′47″S 62°21′00″W
- Country: Argentina
- Province: Buenos Aires
- Partidos: Saavedra
- Established: December 17, 1888
- Elevation: 334 m (1,096 ft)

Population (2001 Census)
  - Total: 2,107
- Time zone: UTC−3 (ART)
- CPA Base: B 8174
- Climate: Dfc

Saavedra is a town located in the Saavedra Partido in the province of Buenos Aires, Argentina.

== Geography ==
Saavedra is located 25 km (16 mi) from the town of Pigüé.

== History ==
Saavedra was founded on December 17, 1888, according to a document published by the Provincial Executive Branch. Outside of this, no government documents give a date for the town's founding, so the above date is celebrated by the town as its founding date. The town was founded after a survey was requested by the owner of the land in the town.

== Population ==
According to INDEC, which collects population data for the country, the town had a population of 2,107 people as of the 2001 census.
