= Clément Cabanettes =

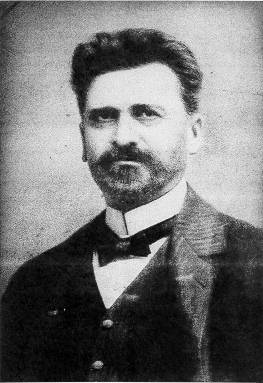
- Born: 1851; Saint-Côme-d'Olt in the southern French département of Aveyron
- Died: 1910 (aged 58–59)

Clément Cabanettes (14 August 1851 – 14 July 1910) was born in Ambec near the small town of Saint-Côme-d'Olt in the southern French département of Aveyron. He is remembered for bringing forty families (164 men, women and children) from Aveyron to Argentina and founding the town of Pigüé, Saavedra in 1884.
