= Numa Ayrinhac =

French-Argentine artist

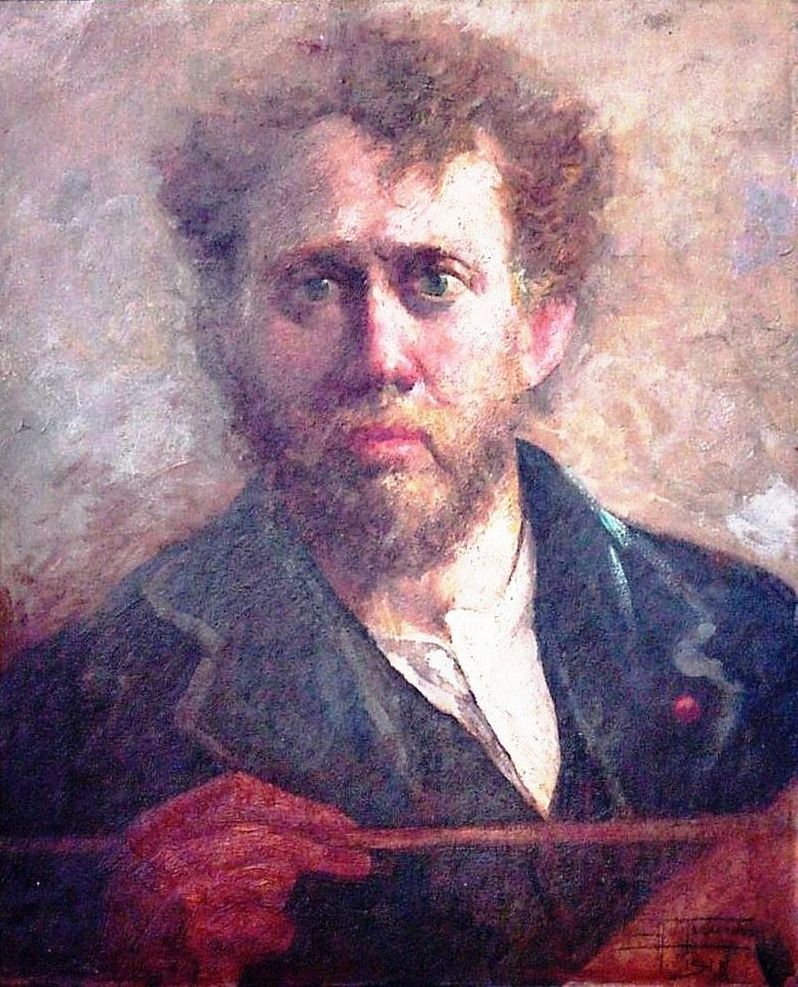
- Portrait of Numa Ayrinhac, by Antônio Parreiras (1918).
- Born: Numa Camille Ayrinhac; 5 September 1881; Espalion, Aveyron, Occitania, France
- Died: 23 March 1951 (aged 69); Buenos Aires, Argentina
- Known for: Portrait painting

Numa Ayrinhac (5 September 1881 – 23 March 1951) was a French-Argentine artist. He was born in Espalion (France) in 1881 of Joseph Sixte Ayrinhac and Marie Eulalie Durand, and moved with his parents aged five to the new settlement of Pigüé, Saavedra, Argentina. He is famous for painting portraits of Eva and Juan Domingo Perón.

He died in Buenos Aires on March 23, 1951.

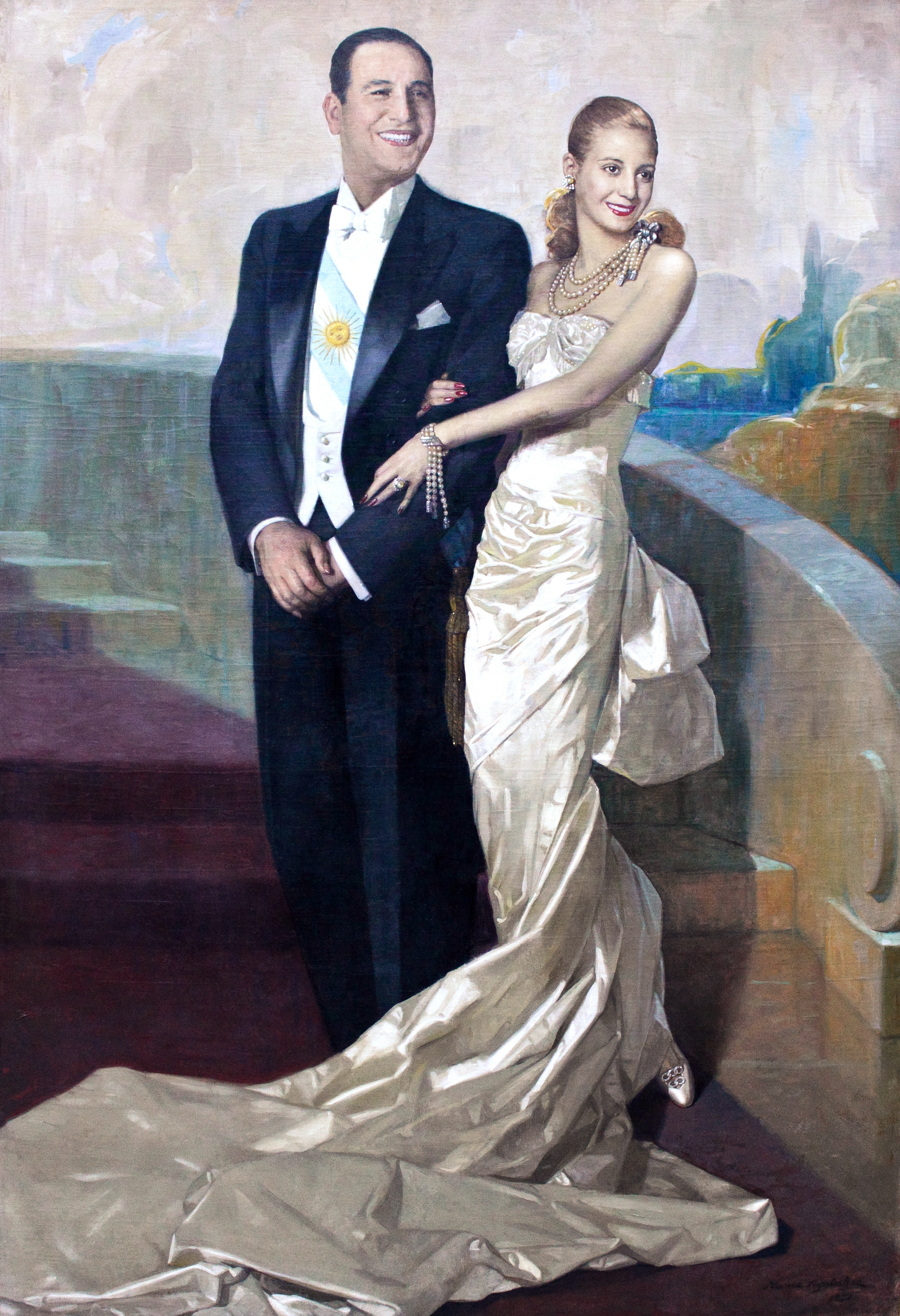
Official portrait of Juan Domingo Perón and Evita, by Numa Ayrinhac in 1948. He is the only Argentine President accompanied by the First Lady in an official portrait
