= Tayrac =

Tayrac may refer to the following places in France:

- Tayrac, Aveyron, a commune in the Aveyron department
- Tayrac, Lot-et-Garonne, a commune in the Lot-et-Garonne department
