= Pierre Poujade =

French politician (1920–2003)

- Born: 1 December 1920; Saint-Céré, France
- Died: 27 August 2003 (aged 82); La Bastide-l'Évêque, France
- Occupation: Politician
- Spouse: Yvette Seva
- Children: 5

Pierre Poujade (French: [pjɛʁ puʒad]; 1 December 1920 – 27 August 2003) was a French right-wing populist politician after whom the Poujadist movement was named.

== Biography ==
Pierre Poujade was born in Saint-Céré (Le Lot), France, and studied at Collège Saint-Eugène d'Aurillac, a Roman Catholic private school. On the death of his father, an architect, in 1928, he was unable to afford the tuition and left school to work as a manual labourer. As a teenager, Poujade joined the Parti populaire français (PPF) of Jacques Doriot.

From 1940 to 1942, Poujade supported the Révolution nationale of Philippe Pétain. After the invasion of the free zone by German forces, he joined the Free French Forces in Algiers, where he met his future wife, Yvette Seva, with whom he would have five children.

=== Poujadism ===
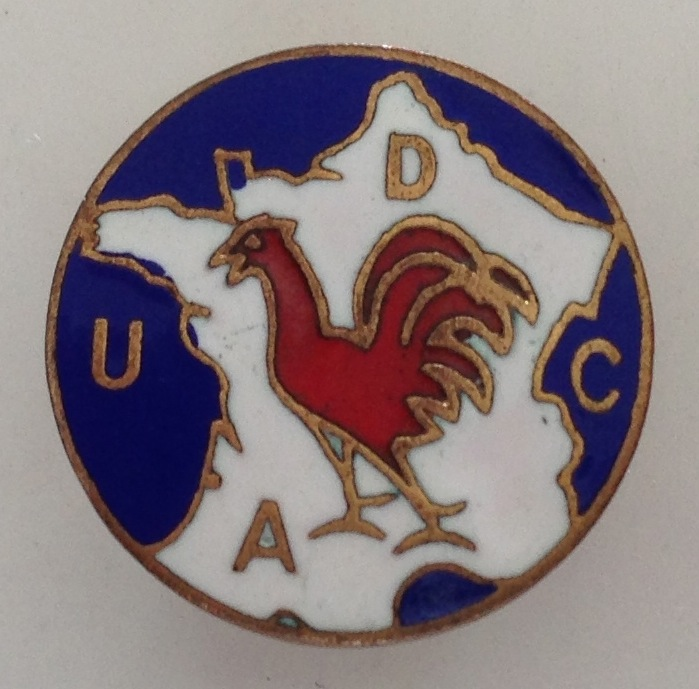
Logo of the organisation

After the war, Poujade was the owner of a book and stationery store.

On 23 July 1953, Poujade was a member of a group of about 20 people who prevented inspectors of the tax board from verifying the income of another shopkeeper. This was the start of a tax protest movement by shopkeepers, first in the Lot department, then in the Aveyron department, and finally the whole south of the Massif Central.

On 29 November 1953, Pierre Poujade created the Union de Défense des Commerçants et Artisans (UDCA; Defence Union of Shopkeepers and Craftsmen), to organise the tax protesters. This movement would soon be called "Poujadism" (French: Poujadisme). Poujadism flourished most vigorously in the last years of the Fourth Republic, and articulated the economic interests and grievances of shopkeepers and other proprietor-managers of small businesses facing economic and social change. The main themes of Poujadism concerned the defence of the common man against the elites.

In addition to the protest against the income tax and the price control imposed by finance minister Antoine Pinay to limit inflation, Poujadism was opposed to industrialisation, urbanisation, and American-style modernisation, which were perceived as a threat to the identity of rural France.

The movement's "common man" populism led to antiparliamentarism (Poujade called the National Assembly "the biggest brothel in Paris" and the deputies a "pile of rubbish" and "paederasts"), a strong anti-intellectualism (Poujade denounced the graduates from the École Polytechnique as the main culprits for the woes of 1950s France and boasted that he had no book learning), xenophobia, and antisemitism, particularly aimed against Jewish Prime Minister Pierre Mendès France, with Poujade claiming "Mendès is French only as the word added to his name". Mendès was perceived as being responsible for the loss of French Indochina. Poujadism also supported the cause of French Algeria.

=== Political involvement ===
In 1955, the UDCA was a strong political movement, with 400,000 members. Its adherents were encouraged to protest against taxes and withdraw their deposits from state-owned banks. The movement called for new Estates General to re-found the French political regime, and published the Fraternité Française newspaper. The UDCA secured 52 seats in the 1956 elections. "Experts said he might win six to eight seats", The Saturday Evening Post wrote. "A great many political leaders, including M. Faure two years ago, have promised to do something about [the tax system]. If they had made good, Poujadism would never have been born". The youngest member of parliament, elected on a UDCA list, was Jean-Marie Le Pen, then leader of the youth branch of UDCA. Poujade was critical of the decolonization of Algeria, and of the European Defence Community. To justify his support for the Algerian War, Poujade declared in 1956 to Time Magazine:

Big Wall Street syndicates found incredibly rich oil deposits in the Sahara, but instead of exploiting the discovery, they capped the wells and turned the Algerians against us...All this is a great diabolic scheme to dismember France. Already the Saar is gone, and soon the Italians will want Corsica...As for those who are against us, I need only say: let them go back to Jerusalem. We'll even be glad to pay their way."

After the Fifth Republic was established in 1958 under Charles de Gaulle's presidency, Poujade and his party largely faded from view.

Poujade ran for National Assembly again, but was defeated in 1962, after which he went on to found an organisation that distributed Nazi political speeches and military songs.

In 1965, Poujade supported Jean Lecanuet for president.

In the 1981 and 1988 presidential elections, Poujade favoured François Mitterrand, while in the 1995 election he voiced his support for Jacques Chirac.

In 1984, Pierre Poujade was appointed to the Conseil économique et social by Mitterrand. Poujade used this position to promote biofuels. In a 1984 interview after the breakthrough of Le Pen's Front national in Dreux, he identified Le Pen as his protégé, but predicted that the FN would essentially disappear by the end of the decade, as the UDCA had thirty years earlier.

Poujade distanced himself from Le Pen and declared in 2002 that he would have preferred to break his own leg than to make him a deputy.

=== Death ===
Poujade died on 27 August 2003 in La Bastide-l'Évêque at the age of 82. His funeral was officiated in the Church of Saint John the Baptist in La Bastide-l'Eveque, on 30 August 2003.

== Legacy ==
Although the UDCA has lost its influence, some of the ideas of Poujadism persist in modern French politics.

In 1969, Gérard Nicoud started the CID-UNATI (Comité Interprofessionnel de Défense-Union Nationale des Travailleurs Indépendants), a tax protest movement similar to the one of Poujade. Examples of recent political groups with strong Poujadist leanings include Le Pen's own National Front (which has a strong anti-tax message), the Comité de Défense des Commerçants et Artisans of Christian Poucet (that encouraged French shopkeepers to declare their business in Britain in order to avoid paying the French Social Security taxes), and the Union des Contribuables Français. The magazine Le Cri du Contribuable owned by Nicolas Miguet also maintains the poujadist tradition.

In a 1990 pamphlet, reissued in 2012, Christopher Hitchens refers to a "... Poujadiste female with ideas above her station", complaining that a political leader had adopted the style and prerogatives of royalty.

In February 2010, The New York Times commentator Robert Zaretsky compared the American Tea Party movement with Poujadism.

In a May 2016 editorial, The New York Times columnist Ross Douthat identified Donald Trump as a Poujadist.

British historian Timothy Garton Ash used Poujade in discussing the British vote to leave the European Union. In a piece published in The Guardian in June 2016, he wrote about some of those who voted for Brexit, saying that:

It is a mistake to disqualify such people as racist. Their concerns are widespread, genuine and not to be dismissed. Populist xenophobes such as Nigel Farage exploit these emotions, linking them to subterranean English nationalism and talking, as he did in the moment of victory, of the triumph of "real people, ordinary people, decent people". This is the language of Orwell hijacked for the purposes of a Poujade.

== Bibliography ==
- J'ai choisi le combat [I Chose the Fight]. Société Générale des Editions et des Publications. 1955. ASIN B001CHWGQG.
- A l'heure de la colère [In the Hour of Anger]. Albin Michel. 1977. ISBN 978-2226005342.
