= Saint-André-de-Najac =

Commune in Occitanie, France

- Commune
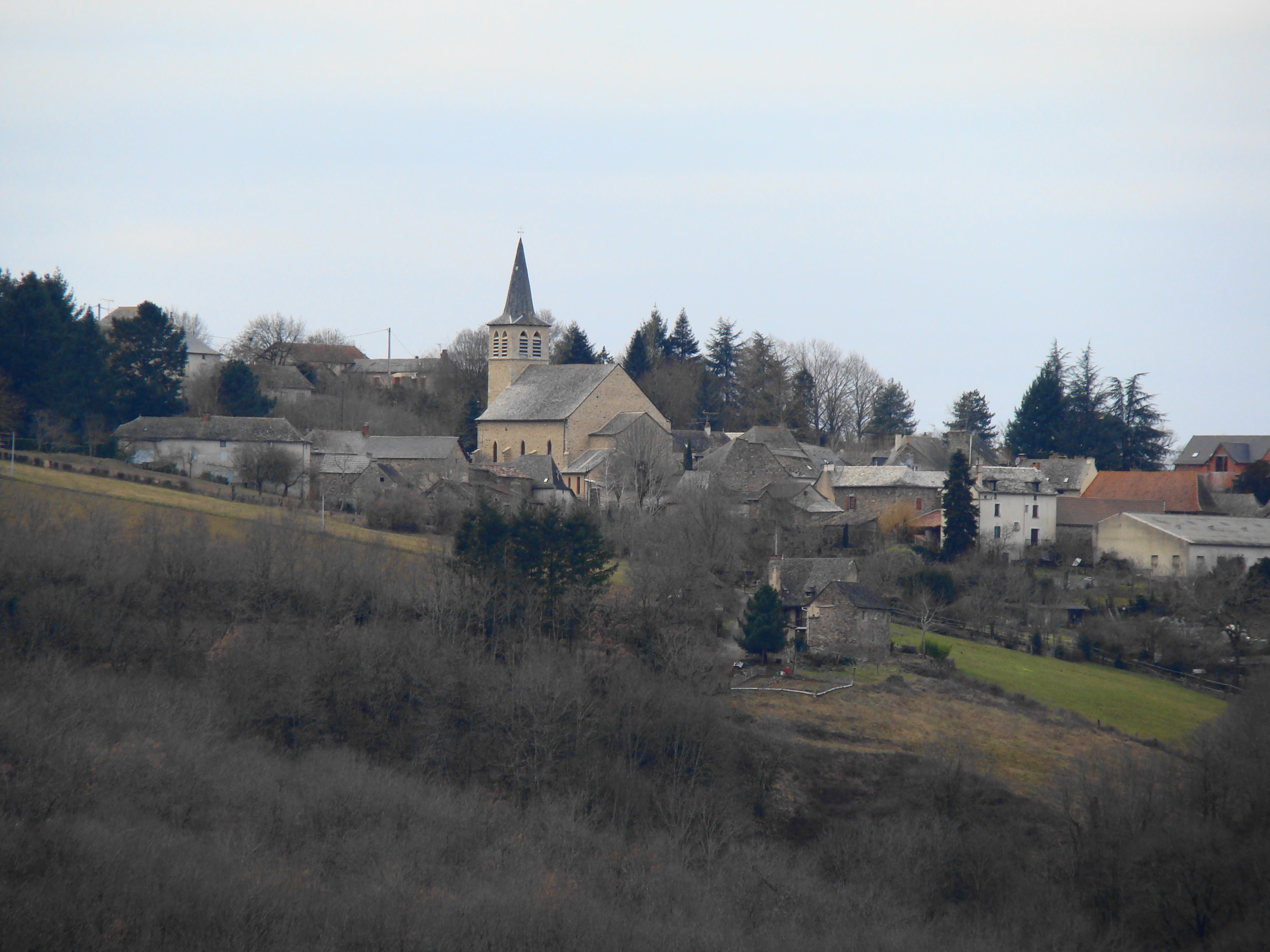
- A general view of Saint-André-de-Najac
- Location of Saint-André-de-Najac
- Location within France Location within Occitanie
- Coordinates: 44°11′26″N 2°02′28″E
- Country: France
- Region: Occitania
- Department: Aveyron
- Arrondissement: Villefranche-de-Rouergue
- Canton: Aveyron et Tarn

Government
  - Mayor (2020–2026): Christophe Dega
- Area^{1}: 25.1 km^{2} (9.7 sq mi)
- Elevation: 374 m (1,227 ft)
- Highest elevation: 437 m (1,434 ft)
- Lowest elevation: 150 m (490 ft)
- Population (2023): 456
  - Density: 18.2/km^{2} (47.1/sq mi)
- Time zone: UTC+01:00 (CET)
  - Summer (DST): UTC+02:00 (CEST)
- INSEE/Postal code: 12210 /12270
- ^{1} French Land Register data, which excludes lakes, ponds, glaciers > 1 km^{2} (0.386 sq mi or 247 acres) and river estuaries.

Saint-André-de-Najac (French pronunciation: [sɛ̃.t‿ɑ̃dʁe də naʒak], literally Saint-André of Najac; Occitan: Sent Andrieu de Najac) is a commune in the Aveyron department in southern France.

== Population ==
Historical population
Year	Pop.	±% p.a.
1968	550	—
1975	540	−0.26%
1982	509	−0.84%
1990	426	−2.20%
1999	373	−1.47%
2007	413	+1.28%
2012	419	+0.29%
2017	442	+1.07%
2023	456	+0.52%
Source: INSEE

Inhabitants are called Saint-Andréens in French.

== See also ==
- Communes of the Aveyron department
