= Crespin, Aveyron =

Commune in Occitanie, France

Crespin
- Commune
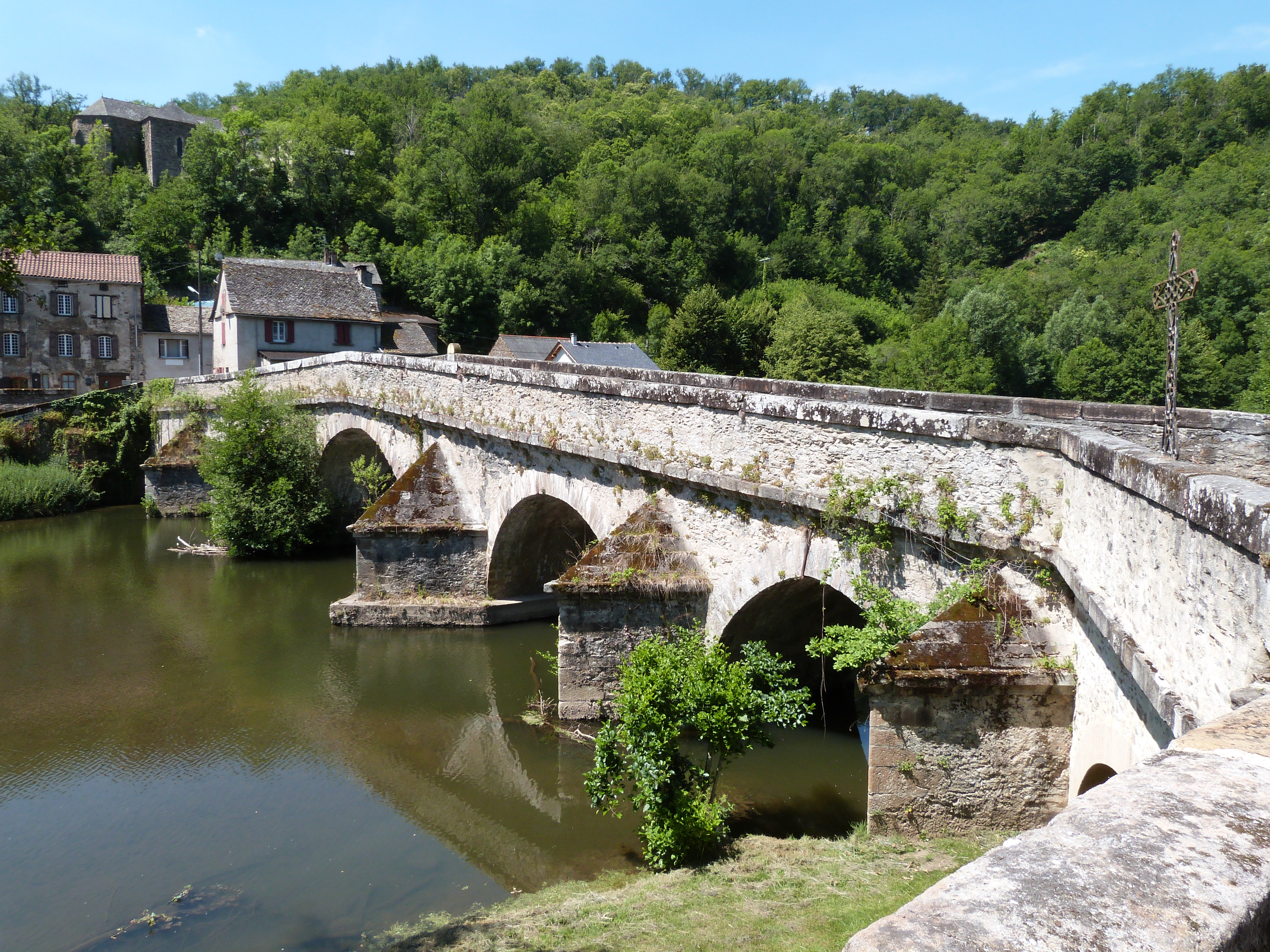
- The Cirou bridge
- Location of Crespin
- Location within France Location within Occitanie
- Coordinates: 44°09′41″N 2°17′03″E
- Country: France
- Region: Occitania
- Department: Aveyron
- Arrondissement: Villefranche-de-Rouergue
- Canton: Aveyron et Tarn

Government
  - Mayor (2020–2026): André At
- Area^{1}: 18.35 km^{2} (7.08 sq mi)
- Elevation: 450 m (1,480 ft)
- Highest elevation: 521 m (1,709 ft)
- Lowest elevation: 237 m (778 ft)
- Population (2023): 319
  - Density: 17.4/km^{2} (45.0/sq mi)
- Time zone: UTC+01:00 (CET)
  - Summer (DST): UTC+02:00 (CEST)
- INSEE/Postal code: 12085 /12800
- ^{1} French Land Register data, which excludes lakes, ponds, glaciers > 1 km^{2} (0.386 sq mi or 247 acres) and river estuaries.

Crespin (French pronunciation: [kʁɛspɛ̃]; Occitan: Crespinh) is a commune in the Aveyron department in southern France.

== Population ==
Historical population
Year	Pop.	±% p.a.
1968	407	—
1975	375	−1.16%
1982	328	−1.89%
1990	298	−1.19%
1999	273	−0.97%
2007	269	−0.18%
2012	283	+1.02%
2017	312	+1.97%
2023	319	+0.37%
Source: INSEE

== See also ==
- Communes of the Aveyron department
