= Lescure-Jaoul =

Commune in Occitanie, France

- Commune
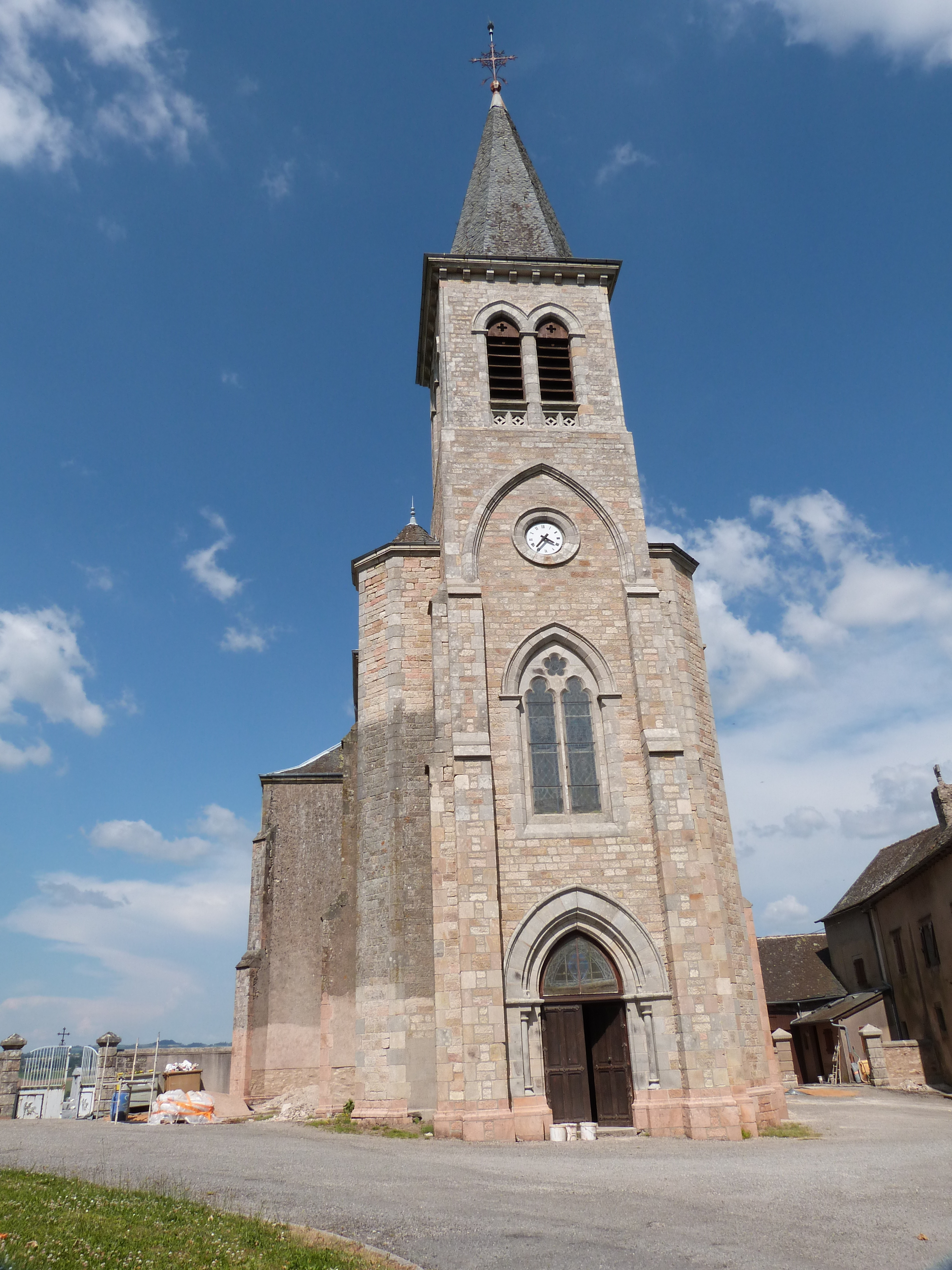
- The church of Our Lady of the Assumption, in Lescure-Jaoul
- Location of Lescure-Jaoul
- Location within France Location within Occitanie
- Coordinates: 44°13′55″N 2°08′48″E
- Country: France
- Region: Occitania
- Department: Aveyron
- Arrondissement: Villefranche-de-Rouergue
- Canton: Aveyron et Tarn
- Intercommunality: Aveyron Bas Ségala Viaur

Government
  - Mayor (2020–2026): Francis Garric
- Area^{1}: 18.52 km^{2} (7.15 sq mi)
- Elevation: 515 m (1,690 ft)
- Highest elevation: 623 m (2,044 ft)
- Lowest elevation: 210 m (690 ft)
- Population (2023): 229
  - Density: 12.4/km^{2} (32.0/sq mi)
- Time zone: UTC+01:00 (CET)
  - Summer (DST): UTC+02:00 (CEST)
- INSEE/Postal code: 12128 /12440
- ^{1} French Land Register data, which excludes lakes, ponds, glaciers > 1 km^{2} (0.386 sq mi or 247 acres) and river estuaries.

Lescure-Jaoul (French pronunciation: [lɛskyʁ ʒaul]; Occitan: L'Escura) is a commune in the Aveyron department in southern France.

== Population ==
Historical population
Year	Pop.	±% p.a.
1968	490	—
1975	435	−1.69%
1982	378	−1.99%
1990	319	−2.10%
1999	268	−1.92%
2007	260	−0.38%
2012	248	−0.94%
2017	229	−1.58%
2023	229	+0.00%
Source: INSEE

== See also ==
- Communes of the Aveyron department
