= Le Bas Ségala =

Commune in Occitanie, France

- Commune
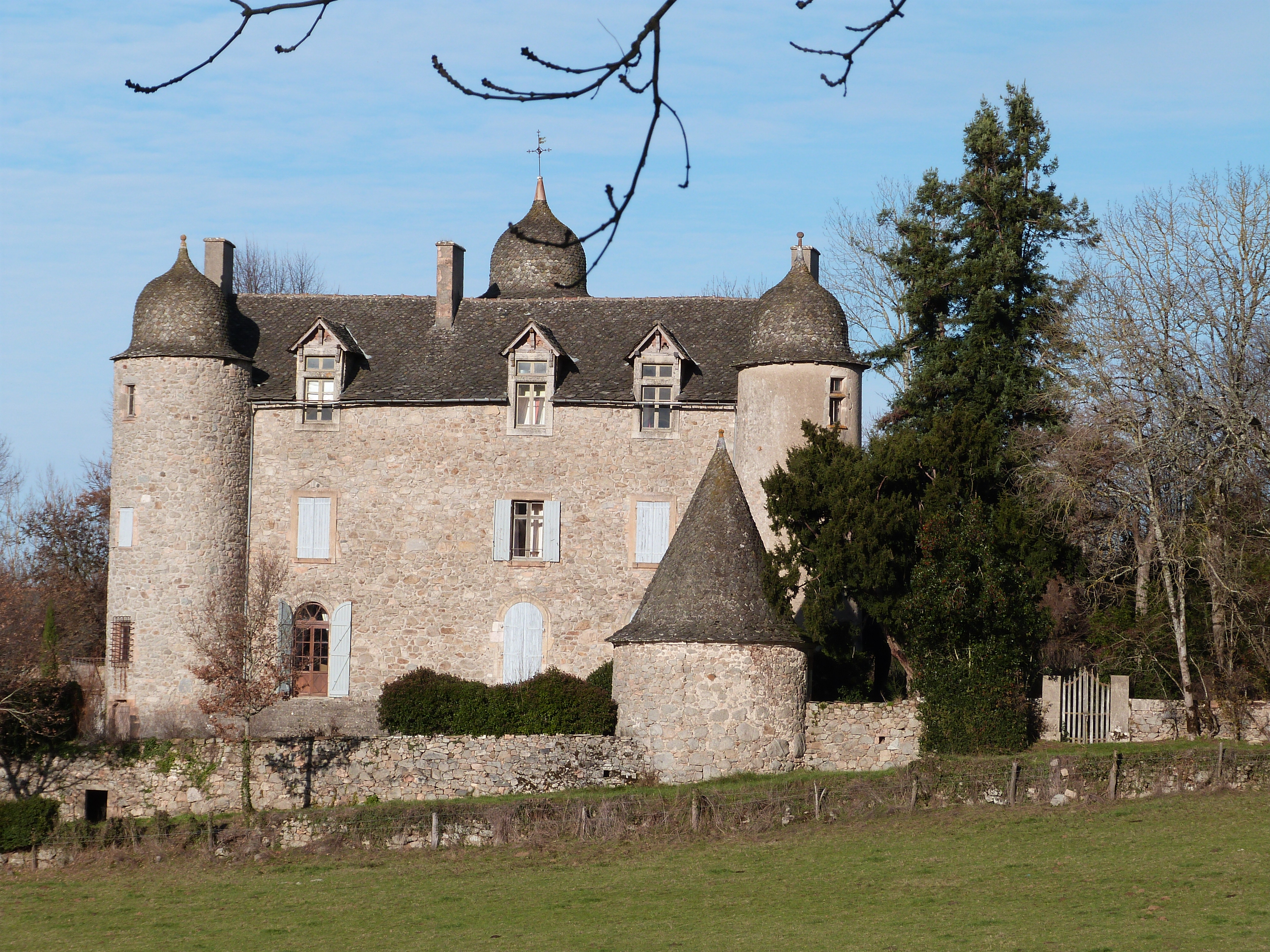
- The château de Réquista
- Location of Le Bas Ségala
- Location within France Location within Occitanie
- Coordinates: 44°20′24″N 2°08′02″E
- Country: France
- Region: Occitania
- Department: Aveyron
- Arrondissement: Villefranche-de-Rouergue
- Canton: Aveyron et Tarn

Government
  - Mayor (2020–2026): Jean-Eudes Le Meignen
- Area^{1}: 82.33 km^{2} (31.79 sq mi)
- Population (2023): 1,608
  - Density: 19.53/km^{2} (50.59/sq mi)
- Time zone: UTC+01:00 (CET)
  - Summer (DST): UTC+02:00 (CEST)
- INSEE/Postal code: 12021 /12200
- ^{1} French Land Register data, which excludes lakes, ponds, glaciers > 1 km^{2} (0.386 sq mi or 247 acres) and river estuaries.

Le Bas Ségala (French pronunciation: [lə ba seɡala], literally The Lower Ségala; Occitan: Lo Bas Segalar) is a commune in the department of Aveyron, southern France. The municipality was established on 1 January 2016 by merger of the former communes of La Bastide-l'Évêque, Saint-Salvadou and Vabre-Tizac.

== See also ==
- Communes of the Aveyron department
