= La Capelle-Bleys =

Commune in Occitanie, France

- Commune
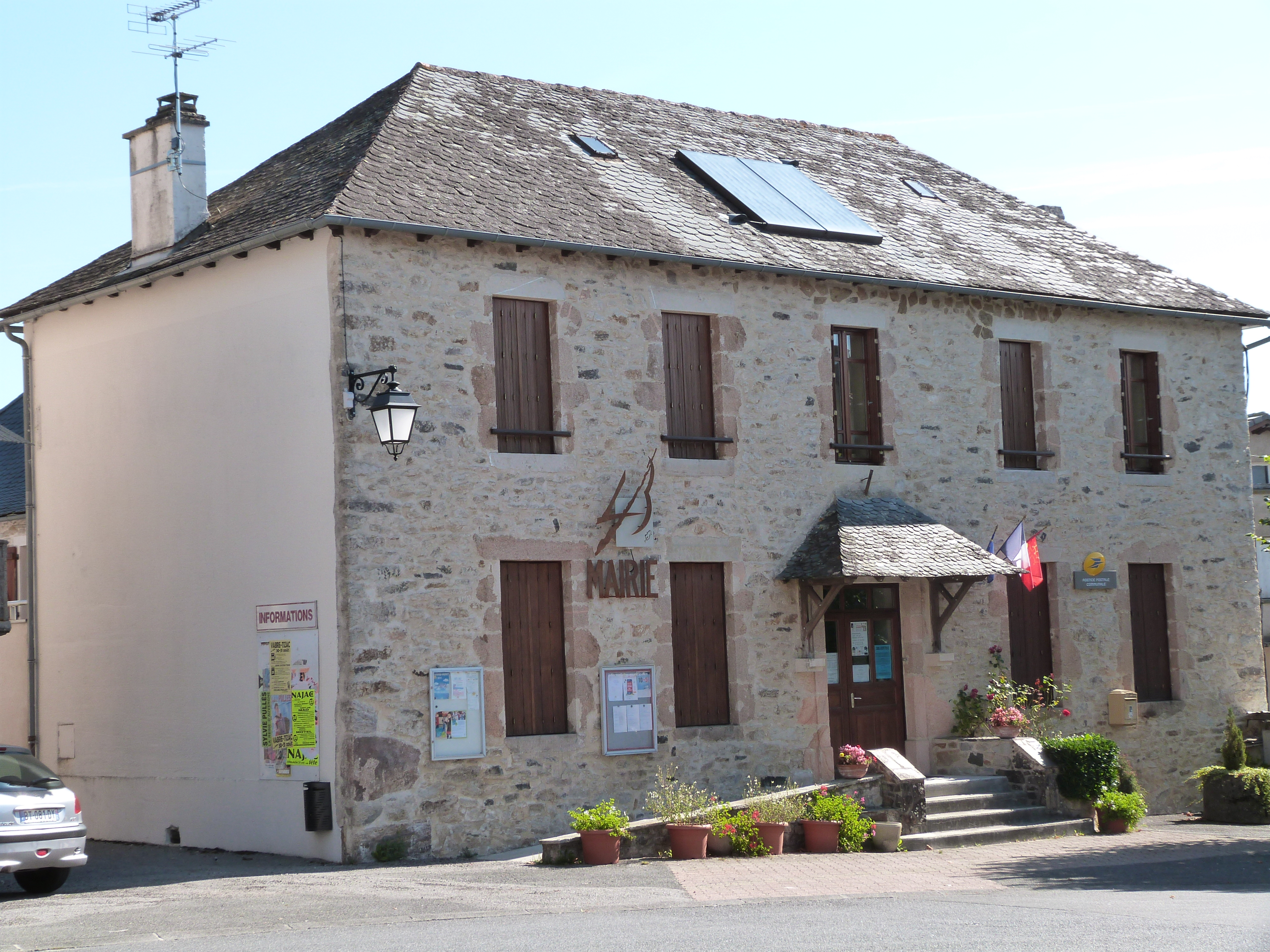
- The town hall in La Capelle-Bleys
- Location of La Capelle-Bleys
- Location within France Location within Occitanie
- Coordinates: 44°17′44″N 2°11′01″E
- Country: France
- Region: Occitania
- Department: Aveyron
- Arrondissement: Villefranche-de-Rouergue
- Canton: Aveyron et Tarn
- Intercommunality: Aveyron Bas Ségala Viaur

Government
  - Mayor (2020–2026): Alain Bessac
- Area^{1}: 15.63 km^{2} (6.03 sq mi)
- Elevation: 619 m (2,031 ft)
- Highest elevation: 728 m (2,388 ft)
- Lowest elevation: 514 m (1,686 ft)
- Population (2023): 366
  - Density: 23.4/km^{2} (60.6/sq mi)
- Time zone: UTC+01:00 (CET)
  - Summer (DST): UTC+02:00 (CEST)
- INSEE/Postal code: 12054 /12240
- ^{1} French Land Register data, which excludes lakes, ponds, glaciers > 1 km^{2} (0.386 sq mi or 247 acres) and river estuaries.

La Capelle-Bleys is a commune in the Aveyron department in southern France.

== Population ==
Historical population
Year	Pop.	±% p.a.
1968	477	—
1975	425	−1.64%
1982	390	−1.22%
1990	349	−1.38%
1999	357	+0.25%
2007	384	+0.92%
2012	381	−0.16%
2017	361	−1.07%
2023	366	+0.23%
Source: INSEE

== See also ==
- Communes of the Aveyron department
