= Prévinquières =

Commune in Occitanie, France

- Commune
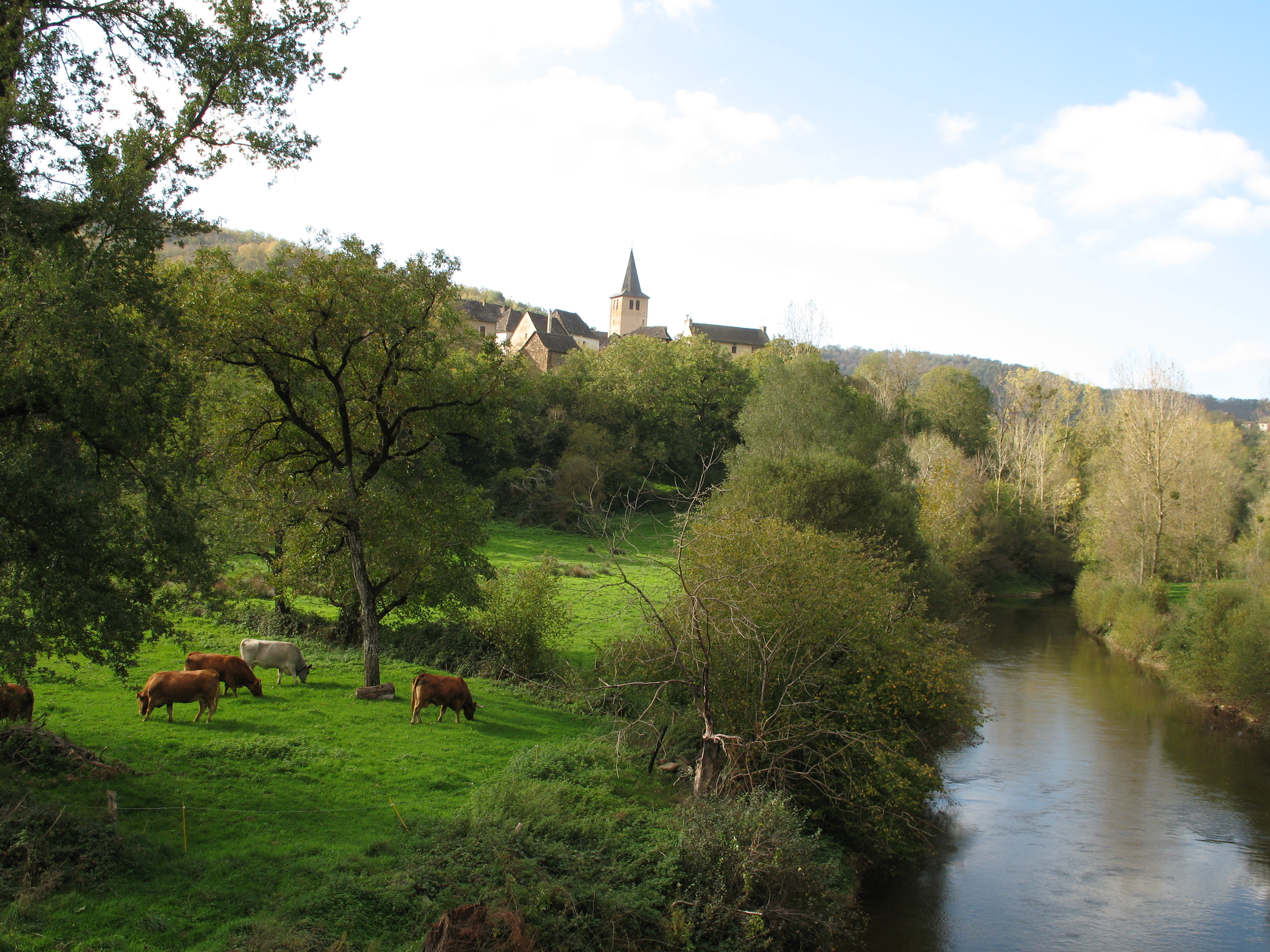
- A general view of Prévinquières

- Coat of arms
- Location of Prévinquières
- Location within France Location within Occitanie
- Coordinates: 44°22′30″N 2°13′49″E
- Country: France
- Region: Occitania
- Department: Aveyron
- Arrondissement: Villefranche-de-Rouergue
- Canton: Aveyron et Tarn
- Intercommunality: Aveyron Bas Ségala Viaur

Government
  - Mayor (2020–2026): Christian Lacombe
- Area^{1}: 20.86 km^{2} (8.05 sq mi)
- Elevation: 376 m (1,234 ft)
- Highest elevation: 712 m (2,336 ft)
- Lowest elevation: 366 m (1,201 ft)
- Population (2023): 269
  - Density: 12.9/km^{2} (33.4/sq mi)
- Time zone: UTC+01:00 (CET)
  - Summer (DST): UTC+02:00 (CEST)
- INSEE/Postal code: 12190 /12350
- ^{1} French Land Register data, which excludes lakes, ponds, glaciers > 1 km^{2} (0.386 sq mi or 247 acres) and river estuaries.

Prévinquières (French pronunciation: [pʁevɛ̃kjɛʁ]; Occitan: Previnquièiras) is a commune in the Aveyron department in southern France.

== Population ==
Historical population
Year	Pop.	±% p.a.
1968	455	—
1975	434	−0.67%
1982	395	−1.34%
1990	329	−2.26%
1999	290	−1.39%
2007	276	−0.62%
2012	304	+1.95%
2017	308	+0.26%
2023	269	−2.23%
Source: INSEE

== See also ==
- Communes of the Aveyron department
