= Pigüé Airport =

Pigüé Airport Aeródromo Pigüé
- IATA: none; ICAO: SAZE

Summary
- Airport type: Public
- Serves: Pigüé, Argentina
- Elevation AMSL: 997 ft / 304 m
- Coordinates: 37°36′02″S 62°22′40″W

Map
- Location of airport in Argentina

Runways
Direction	Length		Surface
Direction	m	ft	Surface
18/36	1,485	4,872	Grass
04/22	1,188	3,898	Grass
- Source: Landings.com Google Maps GCM

Pigüé Airport (Spanish: Aeródromo Pigüé, ICAO: SAZE) is a public use airport serving Pigüé, a town in the Buenos Aires Province of Argentina. The airport is on the east edge of the town.

== See also ==
- Transport in Argentina
- List of airports in Argentina
