= Sanvensa =

Commune in Occitanie, France

- Commune
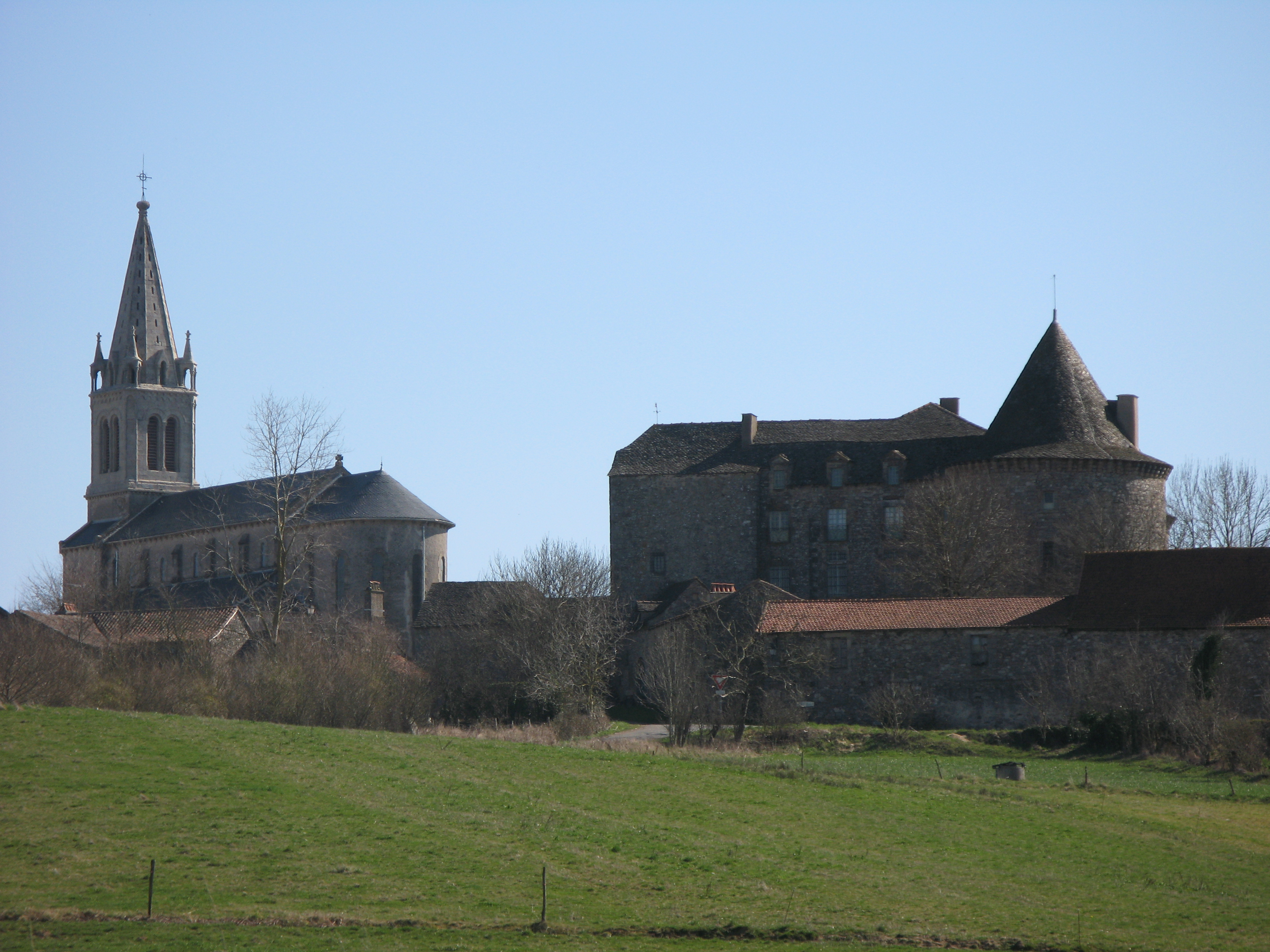
- The church and chateau in Sanvensa
- Location of Sanvensa
- Location within France Location within Occitanie
- Coordinates: 44°17′36″N 2°02′58″E
- Country: France
- Region: Occitania
- Department: Aveyron
- Arrondissement: Villefranche-de-Rouergue
- Canton: Aveyron et Tarn

Government
  - Mayor (2020–2026): Suzette Clapier
- Area^{1}: 25.48 km^{2} (9.84 sq mi)
- Elevation: 480 m (1,570 ft)
- Highest elevation: 534 m (1,752 ft)
- Lowest elevation: 230 m (750 ft)
- Population (2023): 643
  - Density: 25.2/km^{2} (65.4/sq mi)
- Time zone: UTC+01:00 (CET)
  - Summer (DST): UTC+02:00 (CEST)
- INSEE/Postal code: 12259 /12200
- ^{1} French Land Register data, which excludes lakes, ponds, glaciers > 1 km^{2} (0.386 sq mi or 247 acres) and river estuaries.

Sanvensa (French pronunciation: [sɑ̃vɛ̃sa]; Occitan: Sant Vensan) is a commune in the Aveyron department in southern France.

== Population ==
Historical population
Year	Pop.	±% p.a.
1968	649	—
1975	625	−0.54%
1982	558	−1.61%
1990	563	+0.11%
1999	506	−1.18%
2007	612	+2.41%
2012	651	+1.24%
2017	654	+0.09%
2023	643	−0.28%
Source: INSEE

== See also ==
- Communes of the Aveyron department
