= Lunac, Aveyron =

Commune in Occitanie, France

Lunac
- Commune
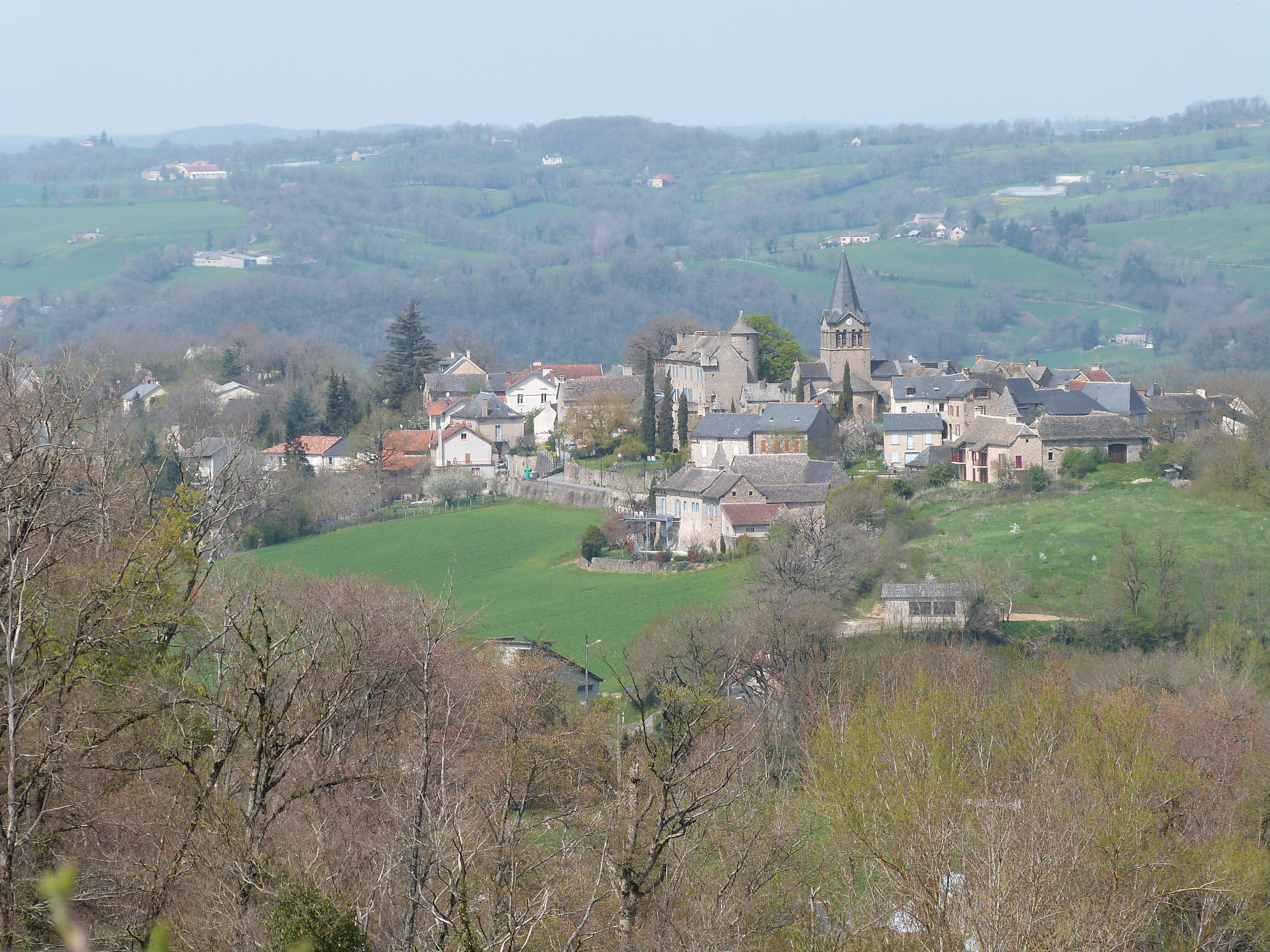
- A general view of Lunac
- Location of Lunac
- Location within France Location within Occitanie
- Coordinates: 44°14′11″N 2°06′51″E
- Country: France
- Region: Occitania
- Department: Aveyron
- Arrondissement: Villefranche-de-Rouergue
- Canton: Aveyron et Tarn
- Intercommunality: Ouest Aveyron Communauté

Government
  - Mayor (2023–2026): Christophe Puechberty
- Area^{1}: 18.78 km^{2} (7.25 sq mi)
- Elevation: 480 m (1,570 ft)
- Highest elevation: 562 m (1,844 ft)
- Lowest elevation: 260 m (850 ft)
- Population (2023): 435
  - Density: 23.2/km^{2} (60.0/sq mi)
- Time zone: UTC+01:00 (CET)
  - Summer (DST): UTC+02:00 (CEST)
- INSEE/Postal code: 12135 /12270
- ^{1} French Land Register data, which excludes lakes, ponds, glaciers > 1 km^{2} (0.386 sq mi or 247 acres) and river estuaries.

Lunac (French pronunciation: [lynak]) is a commune in the Aveyron department in southern France.

== Population ==
Historical population
Year	Pop.	±% p.a.
1968	579	—
1975	526	−1.36%
1982	530	+0.11%
1990	456	−1.86%
1999	462	+0.15%
2007	451	−0.30%
2012	429	−1.00%
2017	434	+0.23%
2023	435	+0.04%
Source: INSEE

== See also ==
- Communes of the Aveyron department
