= Tayrac, Aveyron =

Commune in Occitanie, France

Tayrac
- Commune
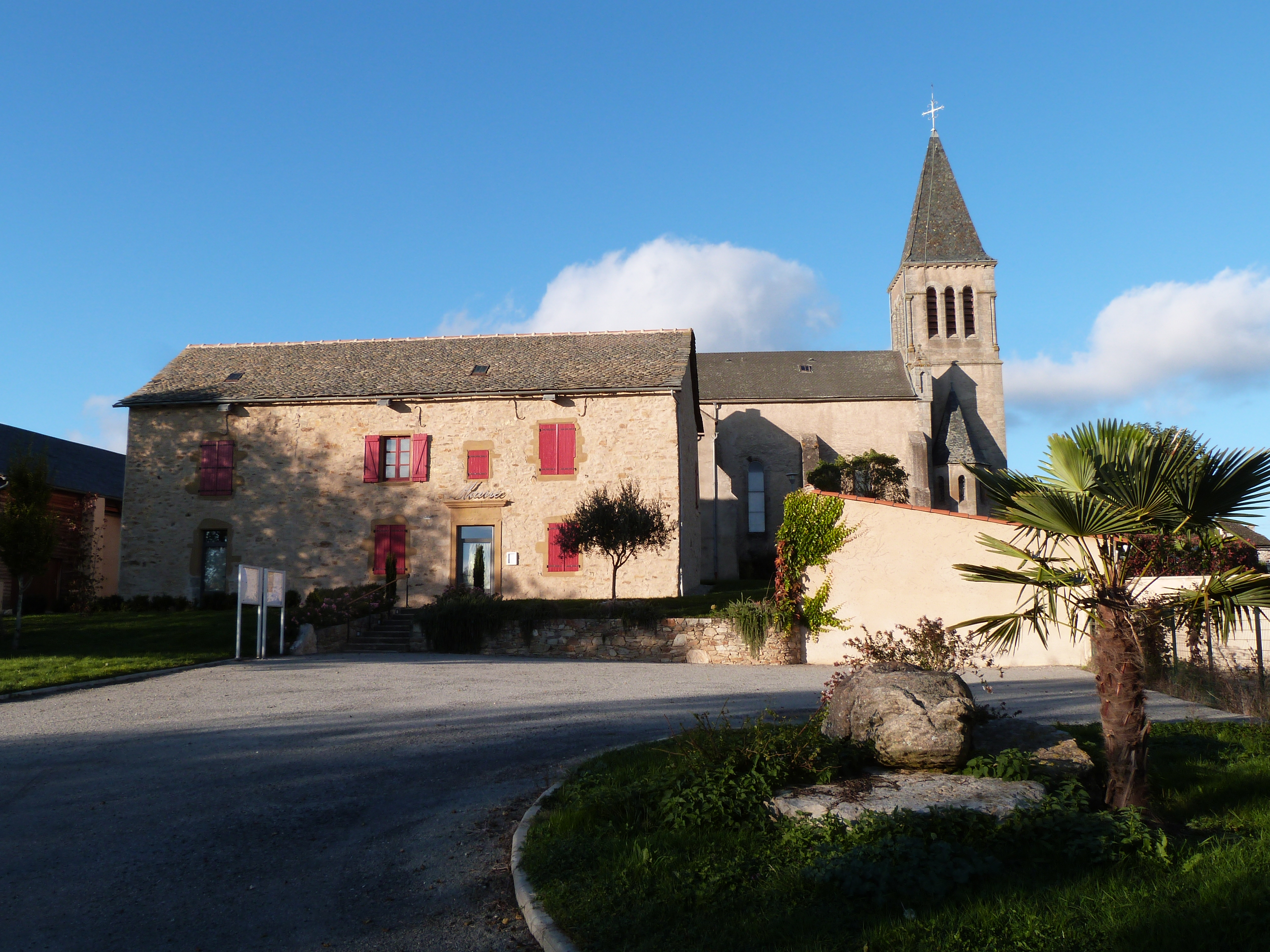
- Town hall
- Location of Tayrac
- Location within France Location within Occitanie
- Coordinates: 44°12′11″N 2°14′03″E
- Country: France
- Region: Occitania
- Department: Aveyron
- Arrondissement: Villefranche-de-Rouergue
- Canton: Aveyron et Tarn
- Intercommunality: Aveyron Bas Ségala Viaur

Government
  - Mayor (2020–2026): Véronique Robert
- Area^{1}: 15.73 km^{2} (6.07 sq mi)
- Elevation: 500 m (1,600 ft)
- Highest elevation: 536 m (1,759 ft)
- Lowest elevation: 276 m (906 ft)
- Population (2023): 188
  - Density: 12.0/km^{2} (31.0/sq mi)
- Time zone: UTC+01:00 (CET)
  - Summer (DST): UTC+02:00 (CEST)
- INSEE/Postal code: 12278 /12440
- ^{1} French Land Register data, which excludes lakes, ponds, glaciers > 1 km^{2} (0.386 sq mi or 247 acres) and river estuaries.

Tayrac (French pronunciation: [tɛʁak]; Occitan: Tairac) is a commune in the Aveyron department in southern France.

== Population ==
Historical population
Year	Pop.	±% p.a.
1968	313	—
1975	300	−0.60%
1982	290	−0.48%
1990	190	−5.15%
1999	174	−0.97%
2007	172	−0.14%
2012	164	−0.95%
2017	176	+1.42%
2023	188	+1.11%
Source: INSEE

== See also ==
- Communes of the Aveyron department
