= La Salvetat-Peyralès =

Commune in Occitanie, France

- Commune
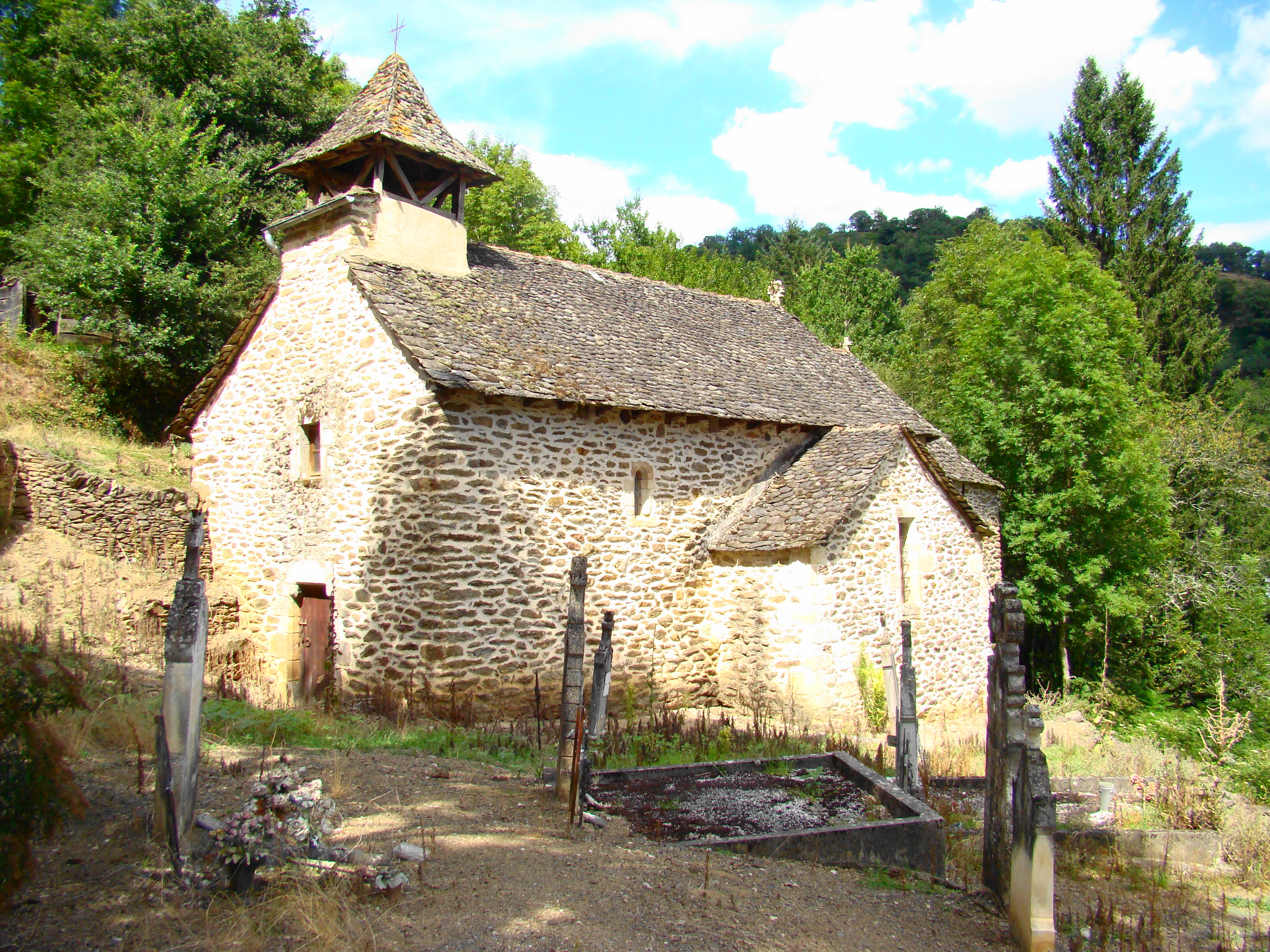
- Murat chapel

- Coat of arms
- Location of La Salvetat-Peyralès
- Location within France Location within Occitanie
- Coordinates: 44°13′16″N 2°12′13″E
- Country: France
- Region: Occitania
- Department: Aveyron
- Arrondissement: Villefranche-de-Rouergue
- Canton: Aveyron et Tarn
- Intercommunality: Aveyron Bas Ségala Viaur

Government
  - Mayor (2020–2026): Paul Marty
- Area^{1}: 54.24 km^{2} (20.94 sq mi)
- Elevation: 612 m (2,008 ft)
- Highest elevation: 638 m (2,093 ft)
- Lowest elevation: 210 m (690 ft)
- Population (2023): 1,004
  - Density: 18.51/km^{2} (47.94/sq mi)
- Time zone: UTC+01:00 (CET)
  - Summer (DST): UTC+02:00 (CEST)
- INSEE/Postal code: 12258 /12440
- ^{1} French Land Register data, which excludes lakes, ponds, glaciers > 1 km^{2} (0.386 sq mi or 247 acres) and river estuaries.

La Salvetat-Peyralès (French pronunciation: [la salvəta peʁalɛs]; Occitan: La Salvetat de Peiralés) is a commune in the Aveyron department in southern France.

== Population ==
Historical population
| Year | Pop. | ±% p.a. |
|---|---|---|
| 1968 | 1,672 | — |
| 1975 | 1,478 | −1.75% |
| 1982 | 1,311 | −1.70% |
| 1990 | 1,162 | −1.50% |
| 1999 | 1,062 | −0.99% |
| 2007 | 1,067 | +0.06% |
| 2012 | 1,013 | −1.03% |
| 2017 | 976 | −0.74% |
| 2023 | 1,004 | +0.47% |
Source: INSEE

== See also ==
- Communes of the Aveyron department
