= Castelmary =

Commune in Occitanie, France

- Commune
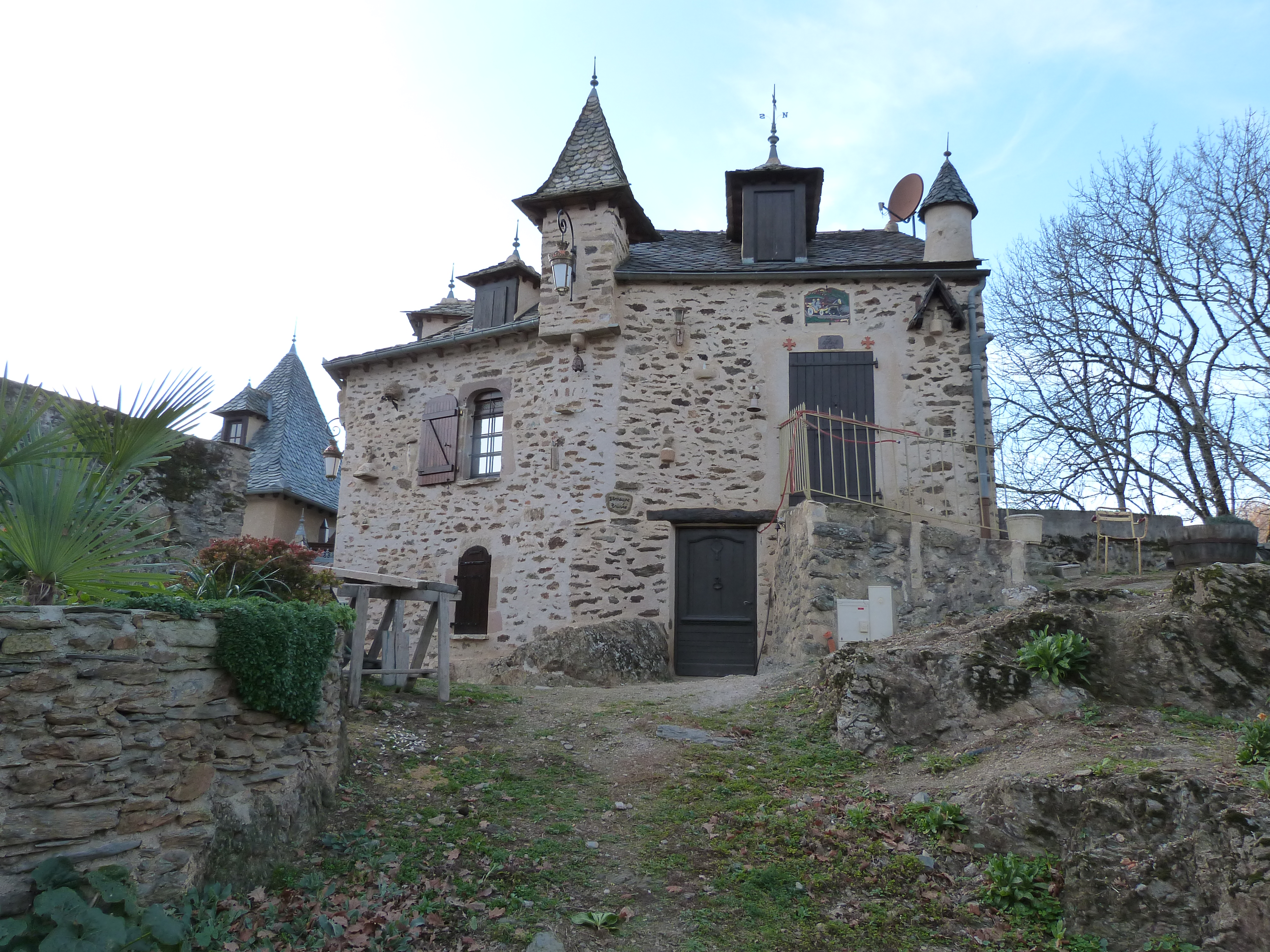
- A house in Castelmary
- Location of Castelmary
- Location within France Location within Occitanie
- Coordinates: 44°10′14″N 2°15′11″E
- Country: France
- Region: Occitania
- Department: Aveyron
- Arrondissement: Villefranche-de-Rouergue
- Canton: Aveyron et Tarn

Government
  - Mayor (2020–2026): Claude Cazals
- Area^{1}: 11.81 km^{2} (4.56 sq mi)
- Elevation: 400 m (1,300 ft)
- Highest elevation: 486 m (1,594 ft)
- Lowest elevation: 240 m (790 ft)
- Population (2023): 121
  - Density: 10.2/km^{2} (26.5/sq mi)
- Time zone: UTC+01:00 (CET)
  - Summer (DST): UTC+02:00 (CEST)
- INSEE/Postal code: 12060 /12800
- ^{1} French Land Register data, which excludes lakes, ponds, glaciers > 1 km^{2} (0.386 sq mi or 247 acres) and river estuaries.

Castelmary (French pronunciation: [kastɛlmaʁi]; Occitan: Castèlmarin) is a commune in the Aveyron department in southern France.

== Population ==
Historical population
Year	Pop.	±% p.a.
1968	203	—
1975	187	−1.17%
1982	190	+0.23%
1990	147	−3.16%
1999	114	−2.79%
2007	131	+1.75%
2012	129	−0.31%
2017	115	−2.27%
2023	121	+0.85%
Source: INSEE

== See also ==
- Communes of the Aveyron department
