= Rieupeyroux =

Commune in Occitanie, France

- Commune
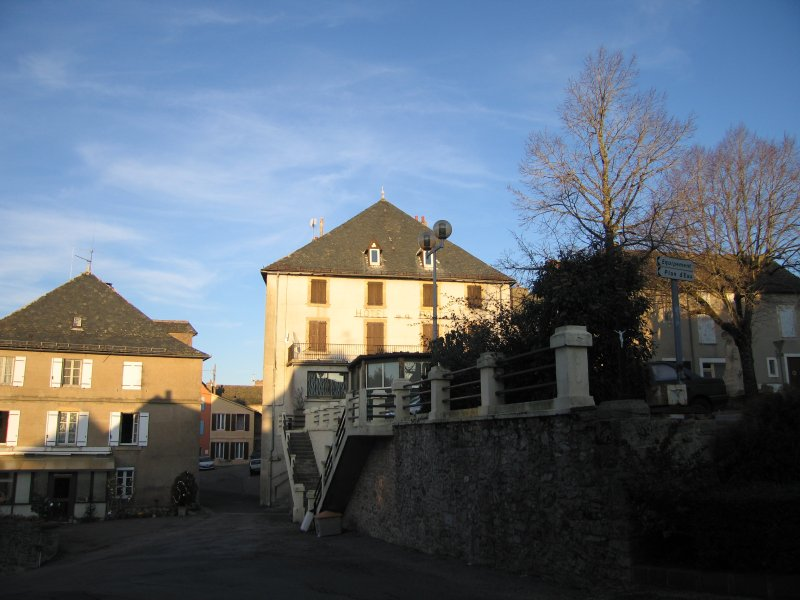
- A view within Rieupeyroux

- Coat of arms
- Location of Rieupeyroux
- Location within France Location within Occitanie
- Coordinates: 44°18′31″N 2°14′14″E
- Country: France
- Region: Occitania
- Department: Aveyron
- Arrondissement: Villefranche-de-Rouergue
- Canton: Aveyron et Tarn
- Intercommunality: Aveyron Bas Ségala Viaur

Government
  - Mayor (2020–2026): Vivian Couderc
- Area^{1}: 54.81 km^{2} (21.16 sq mi)
- Elevation: 720 m (2,360 ft)
- Highest elevation: 804 m (2,638 ft)
- Lowest elevation: 390 m (1,280 ft)
- Population (2023): 1,965
  - Density: 35.85/km^{2} (92.85/sq mi)
- Time zone: UTC+01:00 (CET)
  - Summer (DST): UTC+02:00 (CEST)
- INSEE/Postal code: 12198 /12240
- ^{1} French Land Register data, which excludes lakes, ponds, glaciers > 1 km^{2} (0.386 sq mi or 247 acres) and river estuaries.

Rieupeyroux (French pronunciation: [ʁjøpeʁu]; Languedocien: Riupeirós) is a commune in the Aveyron department in southern France.

== Population ==
Historical population
Year	Pop.	±% p.a.
1968	2,492	—
1975	2,524	+0.18%
1982	2,556	+0.18%
1990	2,348	−1.06%
1999	2,157	−0.94%
2007	2,073	−0.50%
2012	2,040	−0.32%
2017	1,974	−0.66%
2023	1,965	−0.08%
Source: INSEE

== See also ==
- Communes of the Aveyron department
