= Saavedra Partido =

Saavedra Partido de Saavedra
- Department
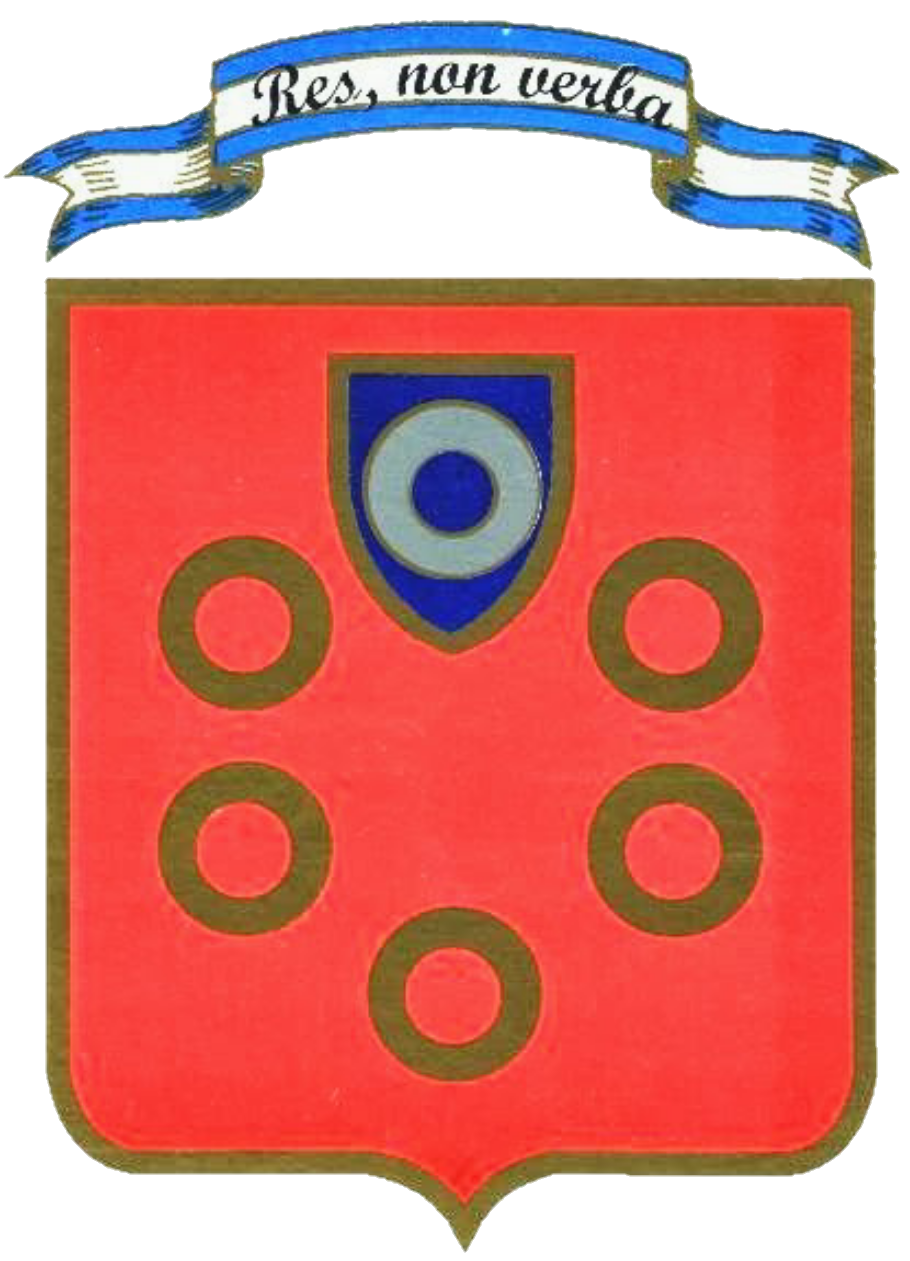
- Coat of arms

- location of Saavedra Partido in Buenos Aires Province
- Coordinates: 37°47′S 62°21′W
- Country: Argentina
- Established: 10 September 1891
- Named for: Cornelio Saavedra
- Seat: Pigüé

Government
  - Intendant: Matías Nebot (Todos por Saavedra)

Area
  - Total: 3,491 km^{2} (1,348 sq mi)

Population
  - Total: 19,715
  - Density: 5.647/km^{2} (14.63/sq mi)
- Demonym: saavedrense
- Postal Code: B8170
- IFAM: BUE107
- Area Code: 02923
- Patron saint: ?
- Website: www.pigue.8k.com

Saavedra Partido is a partido of Buenos Aires Province in Argentina.

The provincial subdivision has a population of about 20,000 inhabitants in an area of 3,491 km^{2} (1,348 sq mi), and its capital city is Pigüé, which is around 584 km (363 mi) from Buenos Aires.

== Settlements ==
- Pigüé
- Saavedra
- Espartillar
- Goyena
- Arroyo Corto
- Dufaur
- Colonia San Martín
