= Canton of Aveyron et Tarn =

Coordinates: 44.31°N 2.24°E

- Canton
- Situation of the canton of Aveyron et Tarn in the department of Aveyron
- Country: France
- Region: Occitania
- Department: Aveyron
- No. of communes: {{{nbcomm}}}
- Population (2023): 10,724
- INSEE code: 1202

The canton of Aveyron et Tarn is an administrative division of the Aveyron department, southern France. It was created at the French canton reorganisation which came into effect in March 2015. Its seat is in Rieupeyroux.

It consists of the following communes:

1. Le Bas-Ségala
2. Bor-et-Bar
3. La Capelle-Bleys
4. Castelmary
5. Crespin
6. La Fouillade
7. Lescure-Jaoul
8. Lunac
9. Monteils
10. Morlhon-le-Haut
11. Najac
12. Prévinquières
13. Rieupeyroux
14. Saint-André-de-Najac
15. La Salvetat-Peyralès
16. Sanvensa
17. Tayrac
