= Ségala =

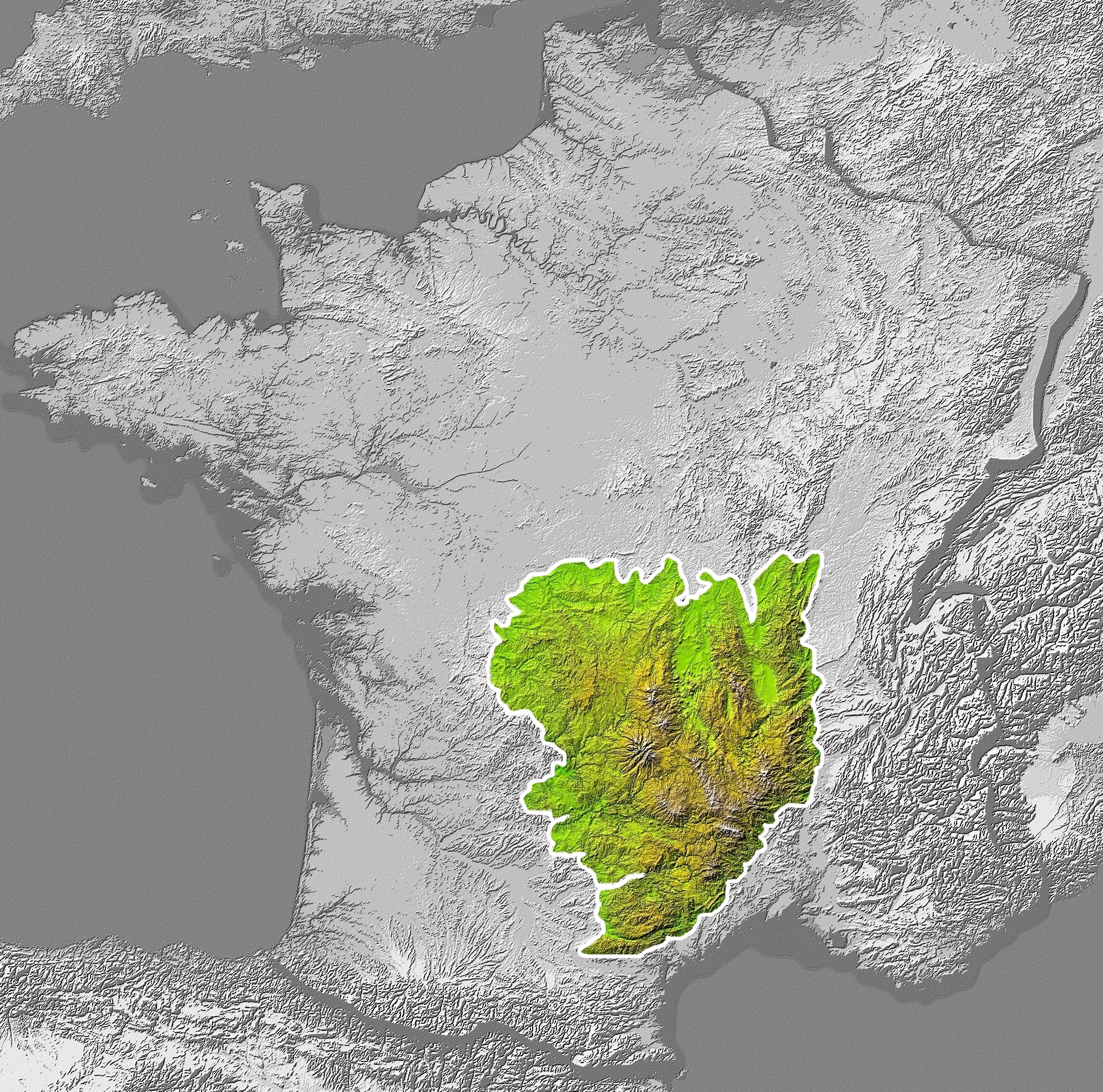
Location of the Massif Central in France

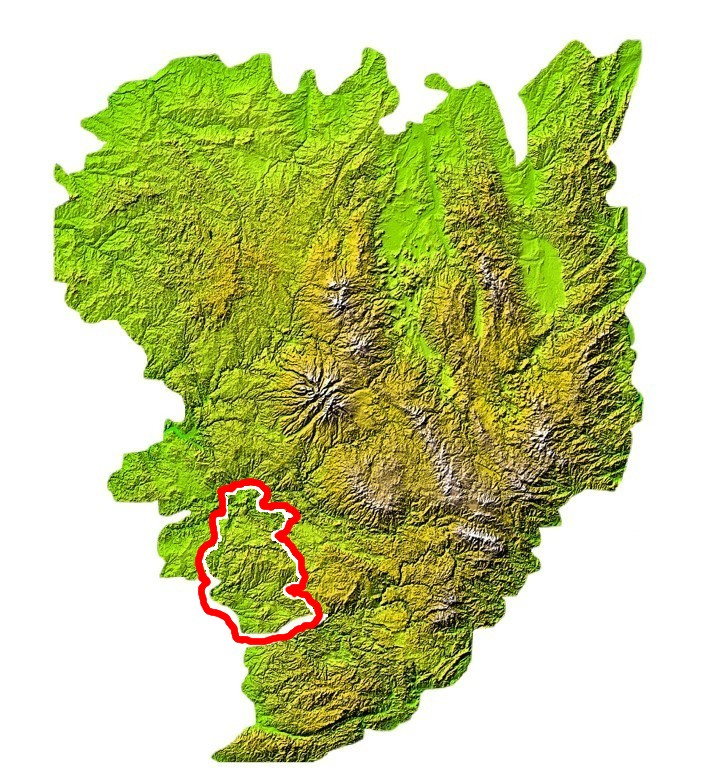
Location of the Ségala in the Massif Central

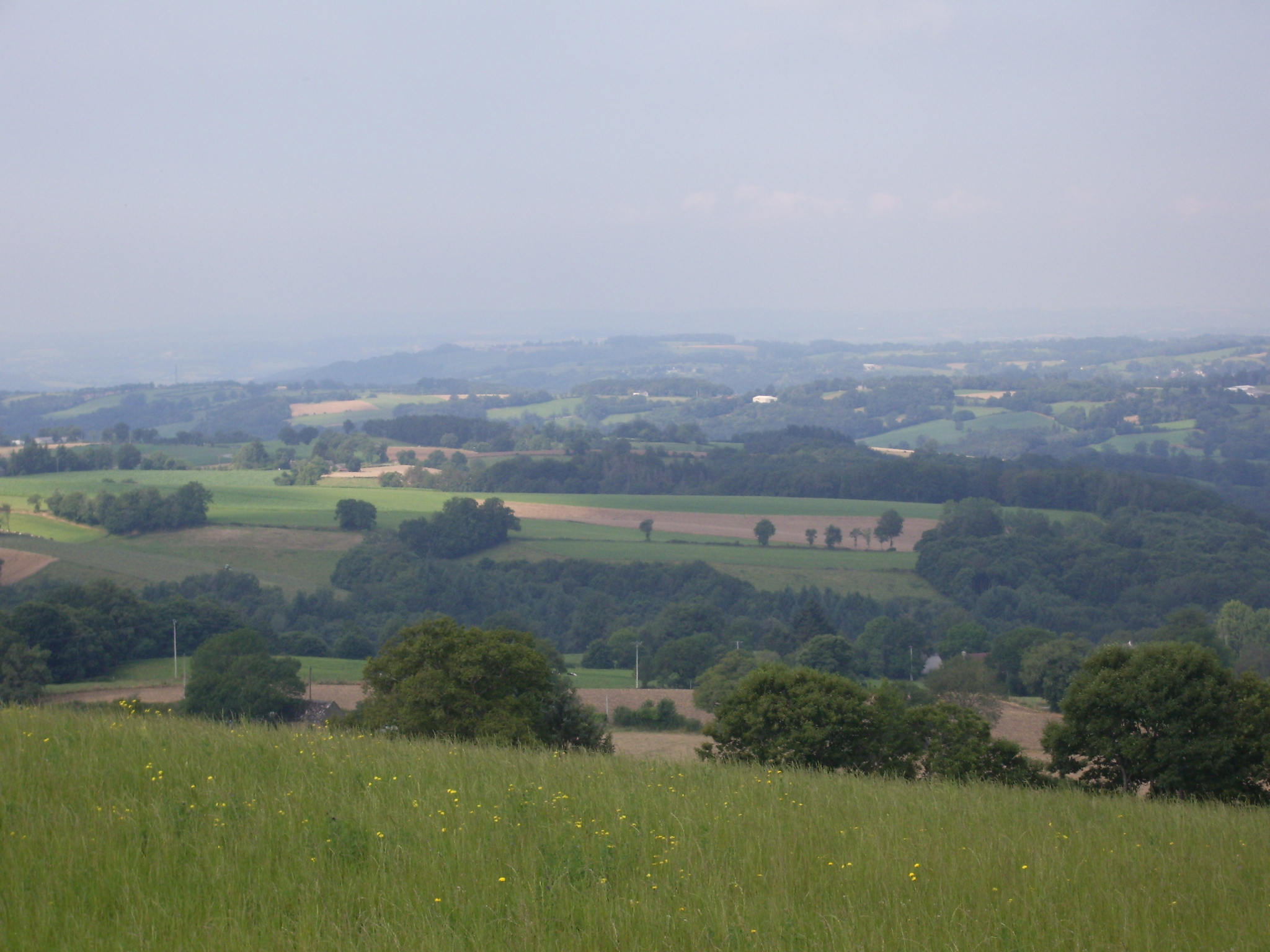
The landscape of the Ségala

The Ségala (French pronunciation: [seɡala]; Occitan: Segalar) is a geographical region that straddles the border between the departments of Aveyron and Tarn, in the Occitanie region of southern France. It is known as the land of a hundred valleys- and traditionally grew the grain for all of Aveyron.

== Geography ==
The Ségala is deeply valleyed region lying between 200 m and 800 m between the valley of the Viaur and the valley of the Aveyron. The valleys are deep and wooded, while the summits and the plateau are dominated by pasture land used for the raising of high-quality beef.

=== Geology ===
The underlying rocks are schists which leads to acid soils. The soils are light and thin, and were unproductive before the opening of the railway with the Viaduc du Viaur, which allowed lime to be brought in. Liming neutralised the soil opening it up to agriculture.

=== Villages in the Ségala ===
Communes in Ségala B-C	Communes in Ségala D-P	Communes in Ségala Q-T
Baraqueville; Belcastel; Boussac; Cabanès; Camboulazet; Camjac; Carcenac-Peyralès (until 1973); Cassagnes-Bégonhès; La Capelle-Bleys; Castanet; Castelmary; Centrès; Colombiès; Crespin	Gramond; Lédergues; Lescure-Jaoul; Manhac; Meljac; Mirandol-Bourgnounac; Monestiés; Moyrazès; Naucelle; Pampelonne; Pradinas; Prévinquières	Quins; Réquista; Rieupeyroux; Rullac-Saint-Cirq; Sainte-Juliette-sur-Viaur; Saint-Jean-Delnous; Saint-Just-sur-Viaur; La Salvetat-Peyralès; Sauveterre-de-Rouergue; La Selve; Tanus; Tauriac de Naucelle; Tayrac

== Tourist destinations and monuments ==
- Balsac
- Rignac
- Ambialet
- Château de Belcastel
- Sauveterre-de-Rouergue

== Bibliography ==
- Au cœur du Ségala tarnais, in Revue du Tarn, n° 223, automne 2011 -in French
