= Caban =

Caban or Cabán may refer to:

== People ==
- Claudio Cabán (born 1963), Puerto Rican marathon runner
- David Cabán (born 1993), Puerto Rican soccer player
- Edward Caban (born 1967) New York City police commissioner who resigned while under investigation for corruption
- Jessica Caban (born 1982), American model and actress
- Tiffany Cabán (born 1987), American lawyer and politician

== Other uses ==
- Cavan (unit), a Filipino measure of weight and volume, also spelled caban
- Operation Caban, a 1979 military operation in French Central Africa
- Caban Island, part of Tingloy municipality, Philippines
- Caban, a multi-use centre in Brynrefail, Gwynedd, Wales
- Caban, a former brand of Canadian retailer Club Monaco

== See also ==
- Caban v. Mohammed, a 1979 United States Supreme Court family law case
- Cabane (disambiguation)
- Cabanes (disambiguation)
- Cabanne, a list of people with the surname
- Cabanne Course, a stream in Missouri, United States
- Cabannes (disambiguation)
