= Cabane =

Cabane may refer to:

- Bernard Cabane (born 1945), French physicist and chemist
- Olivia Fox Cabane, American author, public speaker and the co-founder of Kindearth.tech
- Cabane strut, a part of a biplane aircraft that supports the upper wing over the fuselage

== See also ==
- Caban (disambiguation)
- Cabanes (disambiguation)
- Cabanne, a list of people with the surname
- Cabanne Course, a stream in Missouri, United States
