= List of senators of Aveyron =

Location of Aveyron in France

Following is a list of senators of Aveyron, people who have represented the department of Aveyron in the Senate of France.

== Third Republic ==
Senators for Aveyron under the French Third Republic were:

- Adolphe Boisse (1876–1885)
- Jean Delsol (1876–1894)
- Pierre Lacombe (1885–1894)
- Émile Monsservin (1892–1911)
- Joseph Fabre (1894–1903)
- Antoine Ouvrier (1894–1912)
- Gabriel Vidal (Saint-Urbain) (1903–1921)
- Paul Cannac (1912–1921)
- Joseph Monsservin (1912–1944)
- Joseph Massabuau (1921–1930)
- Amédée Vidal (1921–1930)
- Eugène Raynaldy (1930–1938)
- Joseph Coucoureux (1930–1945)
- Jean Maroger (1939–1945)

== Fourth Republic ==
Senators for Aveyron under the French Fourth Republic were:

- René Jayr (1946–1948)
- Raymond Bonnefous (1946–1959)
- Jean Maroger (1948–1956)
- Robert Laurens (1956–1959)

== Fifth Republic ==
Senators for Aveyron under the French Fifth Republic:

- Raymond Bonnefous (1959–1971)
- Robert Laurens (1959–1971)
- Roland Boscary-Monsservin (1971–1980)
- Albert Sirgue (1971–1980)
- Louis Lazuech (1980–1989)
- Raymond Cayrel (1993–1995)
- Jean Puech (1980–2008)
- Bernard Seillier (1989–2008)
- Anne-Marie Escoffier (2008–2012) and 2014 (Cabinet minister June 2012 to May 2014, replaced by Stéphane Mazars)
- Alain Fauconnier (2008–2014)
- Stéphane Mazars (2012–2014)
- Jean-Claude Luche from 1 October 2014
- Alain Marc from 1 October 2014

== Sources ==
- Liste des anciens sénateurs de la IIIème République par circonscription (in French), Sénat de France
- Liste des anciens sénateurs de la IVème République par circonscription (in French), Sénat de France
- Liste des anciens sénateurs de la Vème République par circonscription (in French), Sénat de France
- Liste par département – Aveyron (in French), Sénat de France
