= Cabanne =

Cabanne is a surname which may refer to:

- Christy Cabanne (1888–1950), American film director, screenwriter and silent film actor
- Jean-Pierre Cabanné (1773–1841), operator of Cabanne's Trading Post, North Omaha, Nebraska, United States
- Martha Cabanne Kayser (1872–1966), née Cabanne, American utopian novelist
- Pierre Cabanne (1921–2007), French art historian

== See also ==
- Cabanne House, St. Louis, Missouri, United States, on the National Register of Historic Places, originally built by Jean-Pierre Cabanné
- Cabane (disambiguation)
- Cabanes (disambiguation)
- Cabannes (disambiguation)
