= Cabanès =

Cabanès may refer to the following communes in France:

- Cabanès, Aveyron in the Aveyron department, Midi-Pyrénées region
- Cabanès, Tarn in the Tarn department, Midi-Pyrénées region

== See also ==
- Cabanes (disambiguation)
- Cabannes (disambiguation)
- Cabana (disambiguation)
