= Baraqueville =

Commune in Occitanie, France

- Commune
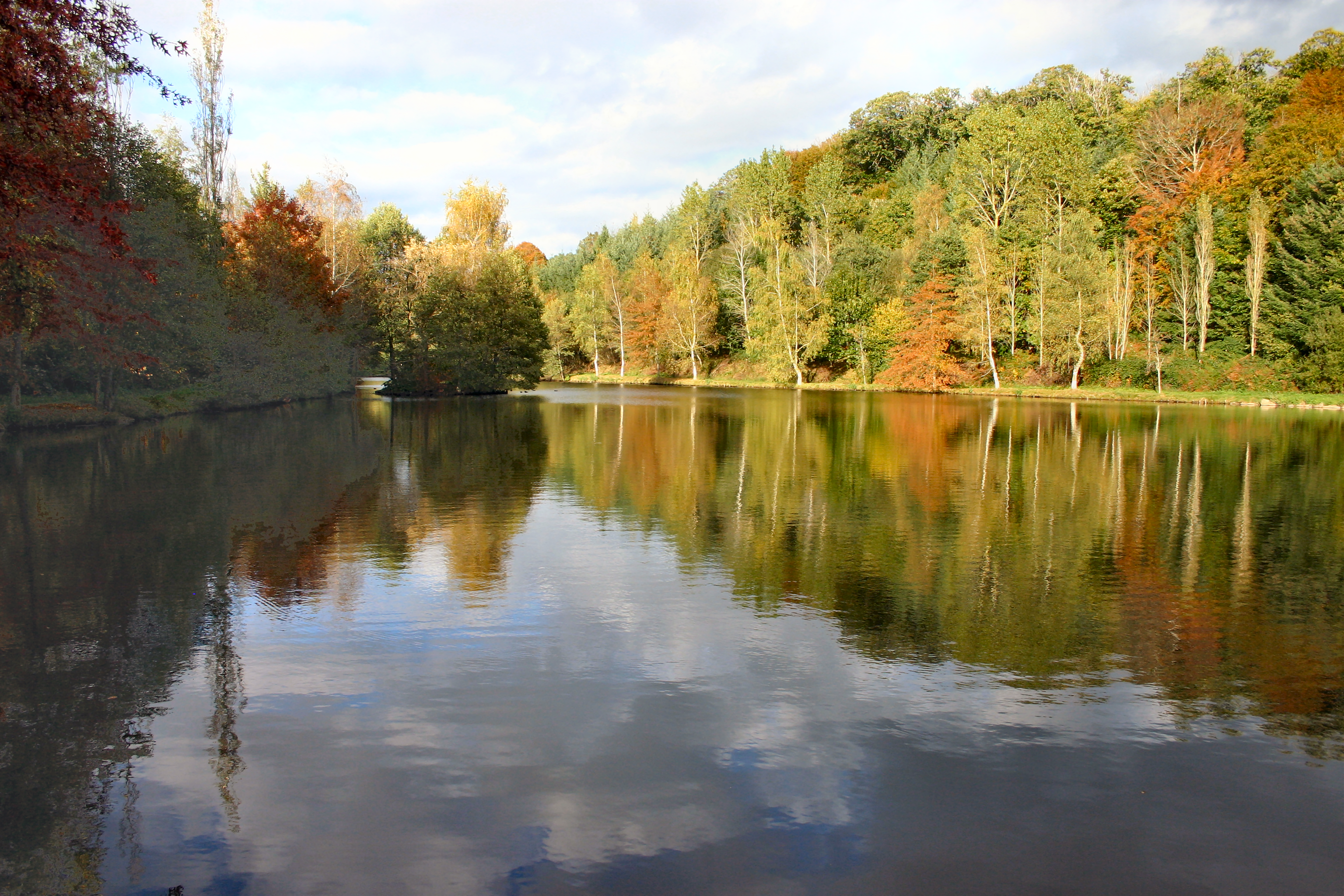
- The Lake of Carcenac-Peyralès

- Coat of arms
- Location of Baraqueville
- Location within France Location within Occitanie
- Coordinates: 44°16′40″N 2°26′01″E
- Country: France
- Region: Occitania
- Department: Aveyron
- Arrondissement: Villefranche-de-Rouergue
- Canton: Ceor-Ségala
- Intercommunality: Pays Ségali

Government
  - Mayor (2020–2026): Jacques Barbezange
- Area^{1}: 34.01 km^{2} (13.13 sq mi)
- Elevation: 758 m (2,487 ft)
- Highest elevation: 813 m (2,667 ft)
- Lowest elevation: 470 m (1,540 ft)
- Population (2023): 3,173
  - Density: 93.30/km^{2} (241.6/sq mi)
- Time zone: UTC+01:00 (CET)
  - Summer (DST): UTC+02:00 (CEST)
- INSEE/Postal code: 12056 /12160
- ^{1} French Land Register data, which excludes lakes, ponds, glaciers > 1 km^{2} (0.386 sq mi or 247 acres) and river estuaries.

Baraqueville (French pronunciation: [baʁakvil]; Occitan: La Barraca de Fraisse) is a commune in the Aveyron department in the Occitanie region of southern France.

The commune is listed as a Village étape.

== Geography ==
Baraqueville is located some 10 km south-west of Rodez and 30 km east of Villefranche-de-Rouergue. Access to the commune is by N88 from Rodez in the north-east which passes through the commune and the town then continues south to Albi. The D57 goes north from the town, changing to the D991 at the communal border, and continues west to Rieupeyroux. The D546 branches off the D57 and goes west to Boussac. The D38 branches off the N88 and goes south-west to join the D997 south-west of the commune. The D507 goes south from the town to Camboulazet. The D624 branches off the N88 in the north-east of the commune and goes north-east to Luc-la-Primaube. There is also a railway passing through the commune from south to north-east with a station at La Cazalets. Baraqueville-Carcenac-Peyralès station has rail connections to Toulouse and Rodez. Apart from the town there are the hamlets of:

- Baracque de Fraysse
- Les Bastries
- Les Cazalets
- Les Crouzets
- Les Fenials
- Le Fieu
- Les Hems
- Les Hivernoirs
- Les Jonquieres
- Lax
- Marengo
- Monteils
- La Plaine
- Saint Julien
- Salayrac
- Les Sapins d'Argent
- La Valiere
- Volpillac
- Vors

Apart from the significant sized urban area the commune is almost all farmland.

The Aveyron river forms the northern border of the commune as it flows west to eventually join the Tarn near Meauzac. The Plan d'Eau du Val de Lenne (Val de Lenne Lake) just north of the town is the source for several streams including the Lenne which flows north-east forming part of the north-western border and continues north to join the Aveyron. The Ruisseau de Congorbes flows south forming the south-western border of the commune and continuing south to join the Viaur north-west of Fonbonne. The Ruisseau de Couffignal rises in the west of the commune and flows west to join the Lézert south-west of Boussac. The Trégou flows from the south-east and forms the north-eastern border of the commune as it flows north-west to join the Aveyron. The Ruisseau des Etangs rises in the east of the commune and flows north-east to join the Trégou. The Ruisseau de Malrieu rises east of the town and flows south, forming the south-eastern border of the commune as it continues to join the Ruisseau de la Nauze south-east of Camboulazet.

== History ==
The commune of Baraqueville was created on 1 January 1973 from the merger of the former communes of Carcenac-Peyralès and Vors.

=== Antiquity ===
From the Roman period the Fountain of Vors (709 m above sea level) supplied Rodez with water by a water supply system 30 km long which is at first underground then by aqueduct. In a direct line the distance is only 12 km. There was also a Roman road following the Ségala ridge.

=== Modern Era ===
From the middle of the 18th century the Carcenac-Peyralès staging post located on Royal Road No. 5 linking Toulouse to Lyon was retained, This was not a busy road and probably had a strategic interest. Carcenac-Peyralès was also on Royal Road No. 3 which linked Montauban to Montpellier via Millau.

=== Contemporary Era ===
- 1810: Construction of the Baraque de Fraysse. Royal Roads 3 and 5 were used by horse riders, tilburies, ox carts, and coaches. During their journey, these people needed to rest, eat, and change horses. To respond to this need Mr. Fraysse built a "baraque" or house at the current location of the Palous hotel and restaurant. The expansion of the Baraque de Fraysse was very slow since in 1866 there were only 15 inhabitants (whereas Moyrazès had 2,300).
- 1903: Construction of the railway between Carmaux and Rodez. Ségala land is very acid so it was necessary to import lime for fertilizer. Before the railway lime was transported on ox carts. Once the Carmaux-Rodez rail link was completed, lime could be brought either from Rodez or Carmaux (Ségala is surrounded by Causses (limestone plateaux) to the east and west). From 1906 fairs were held monthly. Some tradesmen settled beside of the main road. The postal administration asked for identification of the hamlet and the Mayor of Vors chose "Baraqueville".
- Between 1920 and 1931. Baraqueville became prosperous due to potato growing. 30 to 40 wagons of potatoes were despatched daily from the Baraqueville-Carcenac-Peyralès railway station. The 1929 stock market crash on Wall Street had a devastating impact on the world in general and in particular on the Ségala region. Nevertheless, it was during this period that the silo was built along Route nationale N88.
- 1973: Creation of the commune of Baraqueville. André Rudelle (Mayor of Vors) and Joseph Lutran (Mayor of Carcenac-Peyralès) gave way to Jacques Boubal, the first mayor of the commune of Baraqueville.

=== Heraldry ===
Arms of Baraqueville	Blazon: Gules, a pall of Argent facetted with road lines proper couped at fesse point, in chief two annulets interlaced of Or in fesse, to dexter an ear of rye the same and to sinister an ear of wheat the same.

== Administration ==
List of Successive Mayors

From	To	Name
	1848	Jean Louis Ricard
	1911	Jean Durand
1973	1977	Jacques Boubal
1977	2002	Denys Jaudon
2002	2008	Jean-Louis Calviac
2008	2011	Jean Albinet
2011	2014	Marie-José Marty
2014	2026	Jacques Barbezange

== Demography ==
The inhabitants of the commune are known as Baraquevillois or Baraquevilloises in French.

Historical population

Year	Pop.	±% p.a.
1793	622	—
1800	723	+2.17%
1806	1,075	+6.83%
1821	1,164	+0.53%
1831	1,643	+3.51%
1836	1,786	+1.68%
1841	1,333	−5.68%
1846	1,357	+0.36%
1851	1,393	+0.53%
1856	1,306	−1.28%
1861	1,312	+0.09%
1866	1,390	+1.16%
1872	1,432	+0.50%
1876	1,520	+1.50%
1881	1,518	−0.03%
1886	1,582	+0.83%
1891	1,480	−1.32%
1896	1,659	+2.31%
1901	1,603	−0.68%

Year	Pop.	±% p.a.
1906	1,739	+1.64%
1911	1,782	+0.49%
1921	1,678	−0.60%
1926	1,660	−0.22%
1931	1,653	−0.08%
1936	1,704	+0.61%
1946	1,671	−0.20%
1954	1,665	−0.04%
1962	1,676	+0.08%
1968	1,757	+0.79%
1975	1,917	+1.25%
1982	2,104	+1.34%
1990	2,441	+1.87%
1999	2,551	+0.49%
2007	2,878	+1.52%
2012	3,060	+1.23%
2017	3,142	+0.53%
2023	3,173	+0.16%

This table includes the populations of the communes absorbed in 1832 and 1972.
Source: EHESS and INSEE

== Facilities ==
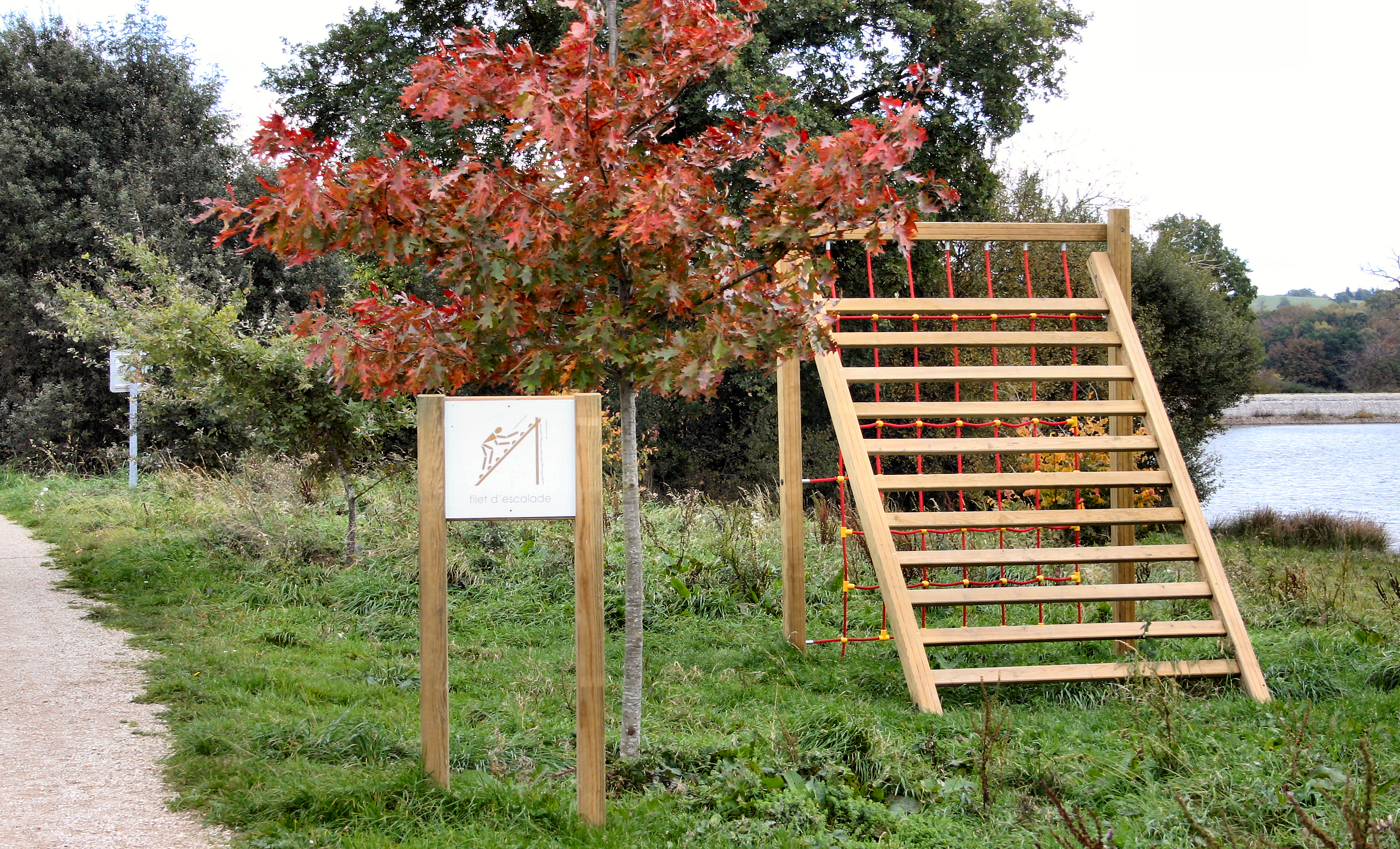
A climbing frame on the fitness trail next to the lake

=== Education ===
- The Georges Brassens public Kindergarten and elementary school
- The Carcenac-Peyralès public Kindergarten and elementary school
- The Lax public Kindergarten and elementary school
- The Albert Camus public College
- The private College of Notre Dame

=== Cultural events and festivities ===
- A Flea market on the 2nd Sunday of every month

== Notable people linked to the commune ==
- Bruno Granier, University Professor, a specialist in sedimentology of carbonates and micro-paleontology. He found several new taxa of fossil algae (for whom his colleagues have named the genus and species). In 2002 he founded an internet scientific journal which is published on Open Access: the main themes are sedimentology, stratigraphy, and paleontology.
- Raymond Lacombe (1929-2002), Mayor of Camboulazet, French share farmer on a 35 hectare dairy farm in Baraqueville.

== See also ==
- Communes of the Aveyron department

== Bibliography ==
Publications used as a source for this article:

- Henri Enjalbert, Thus Baraqueville was born, The Commune, Baraqueville, 1975, 77 pages, ill.; 24 cm, BnF 34641401g (in French)
- Henri Enjalbert, Director of publication with Roger Béteille, Jacques Bousquet, Gérard Cholvy, Jean Delmas, Michel Labrousse, Nicole Lemaitre, and Pierre Loubière, History of Rouergue, Univers de la France et des pays francophones collection, No. 44, Private publication, Toulouse, 1980, 508 pages, ill.; 24 cm, ISBN 2-7089-1689-0, BnF 34727041t (in French)
- Daniel Crozes, On the paths of Ségala, Fédération interdépartementale des Sentiers de Pays, 1984 (in French)
- Christian-Pierre Bedel, preface by Denys Jaudon, La Barraca Sauvatèrra, Bossac, Cambolaset, Castanet, Colombièrs, Gramont, Manhac, Moirasés, Pradinàs / Christian-Pierre Bedel e los estatjants del canton de La Barraca-Sauvatèrra, Rodez, Mission départementale de la culture, 1998, Al canton collection, 271 pages, ill., cov. ill.; 28 cm, ISBN 2-907279-36-X, ISSN 1151-8375, BnF 36988794f (in Occitan and French)
