= Cabana (disambiguation) =

A cabana is a type of shelter often found near beaches or pools.

Cabana, cabanas or cabañas may refer to:

== Places ==
=== Portugal ===
- Cabanas de Tavira
- Cabanas de Torres
- Cabanas de Viriato
- Cabanas Island, an island of Portugal

=== Spain ===
- Cabanas, A Coruña, Galicia
- Cabana de Bergantiños, A Coruña, Galicia
- Cabanes, Girona, Catalonia
- Las Cabañas de Castilla

=== Other places ===
- Cabañas, Cuba
- La Cabaña, Havana, Cuba; a fortress complex
- Cabañas Department, El Salvador
- La Cabaña Airport, El Paisnal, San Salvador Department, El Salvador
- Cabañas, Zacapa, Guatemala
- Cabañas, Copán, Honduras
- Cabañas, La Paz, Honduras
- Cabana, Peru
- Cabana District, Ancash, Peru
- Las Cabañas Bridge, Adjuntas, Puerto Rico; a highway bridge
- Cabana (ancient lake), in the Altiplano of South America
- Cabana Beach Bar, Geroskipou, Cyprus

== People ==
- Anna Cabana (born 1979), French journalist
- Cole Cabana (born 2004), American college football running back
- Colt Cabana, ring name of American professional wrestler Scott Colton (born 1980)
- Dario Xoan Cabana, writer of Galician literature
- Frédérik Cabana (born 1986), Canadian ice hockey player
- Hubert-Charron Cabana (1838–1901), Canadian politician
- Jean-Paul Cabana (fl. from 1971), Canadian race car driver
- José Trinidad Cabañas (1805–1871), president of Honduras
- Lucio Cabañas (1938–1974), Mexican revolutionary
- Ricardo Cabanas (born 1979), Swiss footballer
- Robert D. Cabana (born 1949), American astronaut
- Salvador Cabañas (born 1980), Paraguayan footballer

== Other uses ==
- Cabana (chocolate bar), a defunct British brand
- Cabana (passenger train), a named passenger train of the United States
- USS Cabana, an American World War II warship

== See also ==
- Cabin (disambiguation)
- Cabanes (disambiguation)
- Cabanès (disambiguation)
- Cabannes (disambiguation)
- Kabanos, or cabanossi or kabana, a Polish sausage
- Kibana, software
- Taco Cabana, an American fast food restaurant chain
