= Henri Moysset =

French historian and politician

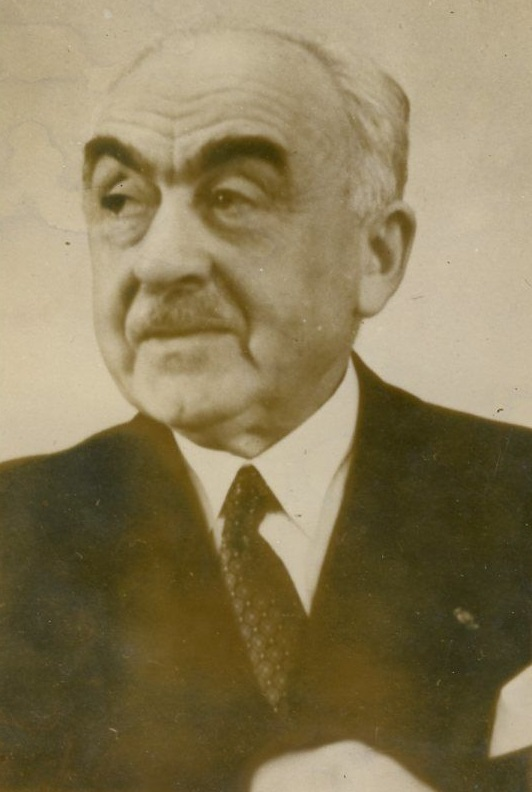
- Henri Moysset circa 1938
- Born: 26 March 1875; Gramond, Aveyron, France
- Died: 1 August 1949 (aged 74); Paris, France
- Education: University of Bordeaux
- Occupations: Historian, politician

Henri Moysset (26 March 1875 – 1 August 1949) was a French historian and politician. He was a scholar of the history of socialism, especially Pierre-Joseph Proudhon. He was the French Minister of State for the Coordination of New Institutions from 1941 to 1942. He was a vocal critic of Pan-Germanism, and he influenced many of Vichy France's social policies.

== Early life ==
Henri Moysset was born on 26 March 1875 in Gramond, Aveyron, France. He graduated from the University of Bordeaux.

== Career ==
Moysset taught history at the École Navale. He was a scholar the history of socialism, especially Pierre-Joseph Proudhon. He authored a book about Germany in the two decades after Otto von Bismarck. The book was praised by The New York Times, which read "Moysset's style has restraint and shows evidences of research and deliberation."

Moysset was an advisor to prime ministers Georges Leygues and André Tardieu. He was François Darlan's chief of staff at the Ministry of the Navy from 1939 to 1941. On 23 January 1941, Moysset was made a member of the National Council of Vichy France. He served as the Minister of State for the Coordination of New Institutions from 11 August 1941 to 18 April 1942. He was decorated with the Order of the Francisque.

Moysset was a vocal critic of Pan-Germanism. He was an influential figure during Vichy France, especially with regards to its social policies.

== Death ==
Moysset died on 1 August 1949 in Paris.

== Works ==
- Moysset, Henri (1911). L'esprit public en Allemagne vingt ans après Bismarck. Paris: Alcan. OCLC 797595694.
