= Jean Briane =

French politician (1930–2021)

Member of the French National Assembly
- In office 5 December 1971 – 18 June 2002
- Preceded by: Roland Boscary-Monsservin
- Succeeded by: Yves Censi
- Constituency: Aveyron's 1st constituency

Member of the Parliamentary Assembly of the Council of Europe
- In office 10 May 1993 – 28 June 2002

Personal details
- Born: 20 October 1930 Quins, France
- Died: 3 December 2021 (aged 91)
- Party: UDF

Jean Briane (20 October 1930 – 3 December 2021) was a French politician. A member of the Union for French Democracy, he served Aveyron's 1st constituency in the National Assembly from 1971 to 2002.
