= Escoffier (surname) =

Escoffier is a surname of French origin. Notable people with the surname include:

- Alain Escoffier (1949–1977), French anti-communist activist and martyr
- Anne-Marie Escoffier (born 1942), French politician
- Antoine Escoffier (born 1992), French tennis player
- Auguste Escoffier (1846–1935), French chef, the father of cuisine classique style of haute cuisine
- Jean-Yves Escoffier (1950–2003), French cinematographer
- Jeffrey Escoffier (1942–2022), American author, activist, and media strategist
- Kevin Escoffier (born 1980), French professional sailor
- Louis-Casimir Escoffier, known as Casimir Ney (1801–1877), French composer and violist

== See also ==
- Escoffier, a character in the video game Genshin Impact
- Auguste Escoffier School of Culinary Arts
- Ritz-Escoffier School
