= Yves Censi =

French politician

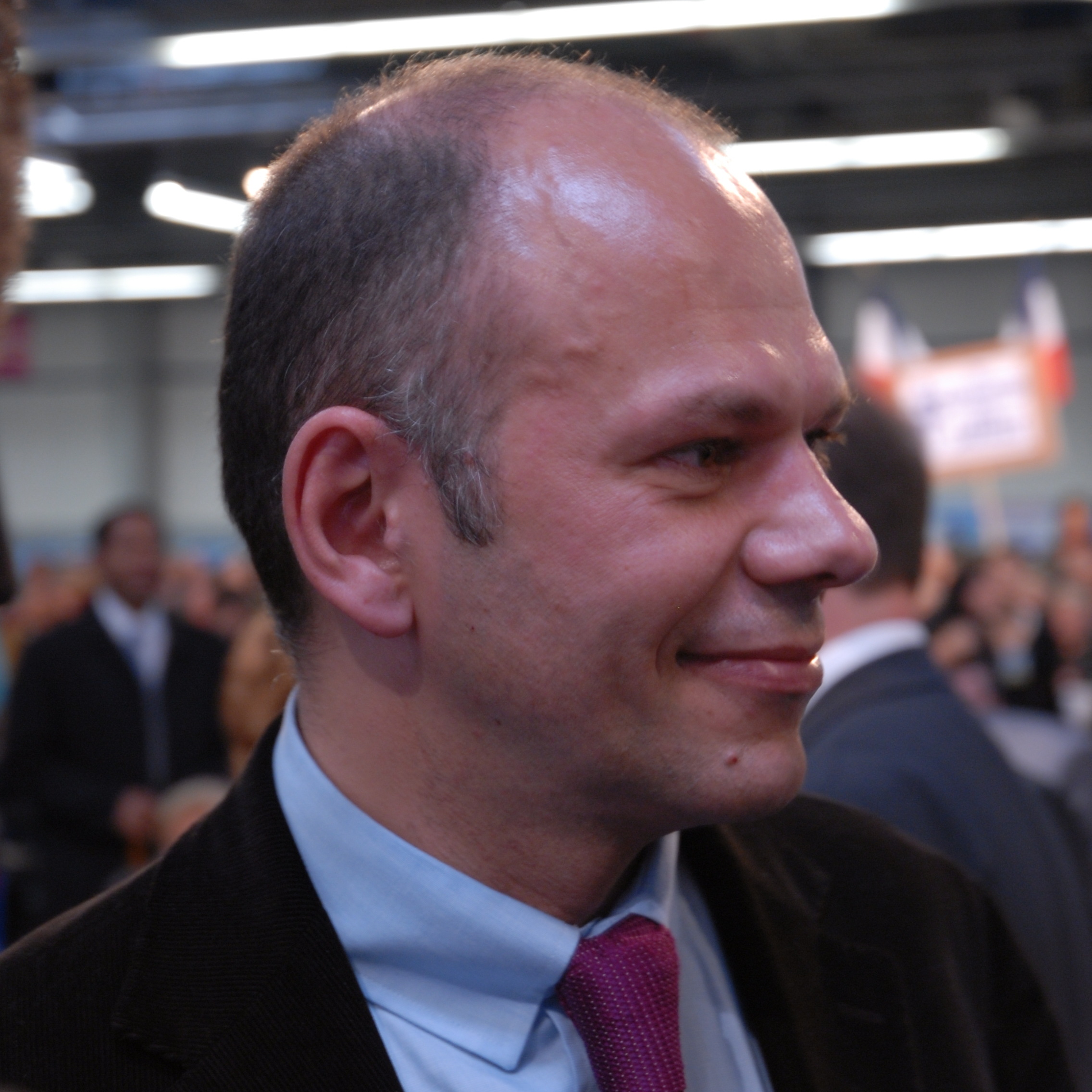
- Yves Censi in 2007

Member of the National Assembly for Aveyron's 1st constituency
- In office 20 June 2002 – 20 June 2017
- Preceded by: Jean Briane
- Succeeded by: Stéphane Mazars

Personal details
- Born: 8 February 1964 (age 62) Rodez, France
- Party: UMP

Yves Censi (born 8 February 1964) was a member of the National Assembly of France. He represented the first constituency of the Aveyron department, from 2002 to 2017 as a member of the Union for a Popular Movement.

== Biography ==
Born on February 8, 1964, in Rodez, he is the son of Marc Censi, former mayor of Rodez.

A graduate of Clermont School of Business and holder of a DEA Ens-Ehess in social sciences, he began his career as an organizational consulting engineer at KPMG Peat Marwick Consultants, before heading up marketing and online gaming at La Française des Jeux.

In 1998, he became an advisor to Jacques Chirac at the Élysée Palace during the cohabitation period, working alongside Claude Chirac on the image and communications of the President of the Republic.

In 2022, Yves Censi became a Senior Partner at Mascaret, specializing in business communication.

== Political Career ==
Yves Censi’s father, Marc Censi, the outgoing mayor of Rodez, did not run for reelection in 2008. Christian Teyssèdre, the Socialist Party candidate facing, among others, a right-wing field divided into two DVD lists and one UMP list won in the first round. Yves Censi attributed this defeat to poor leadership by his party’s local leadership.

Starting in 2012, Yves Censi campaigned with the opposition in Rodez.

Although he ran on a joint UMP-UDI ticket, Yves Censi was defeated in the March 2014 municipal elections following a three-way race against two left-wing slates, including that of incumbent mayor Christian Teyssèdre.
