= The Charisma Myth =

Book by Olivia Fox Cabane

- Author: Olivia Fox Cabane
- Language: English
- Genre: Non-fiction
- Publisher: Portfolio
- Publication date: 2012

The Charisma Myth is a 2012 non-fiction book by Olivia Fox Cabane. It shares what the author believes are the main components of charisma: presence, power, and warmth.
