= Stéphane Mazars =

French politician (born 1969)

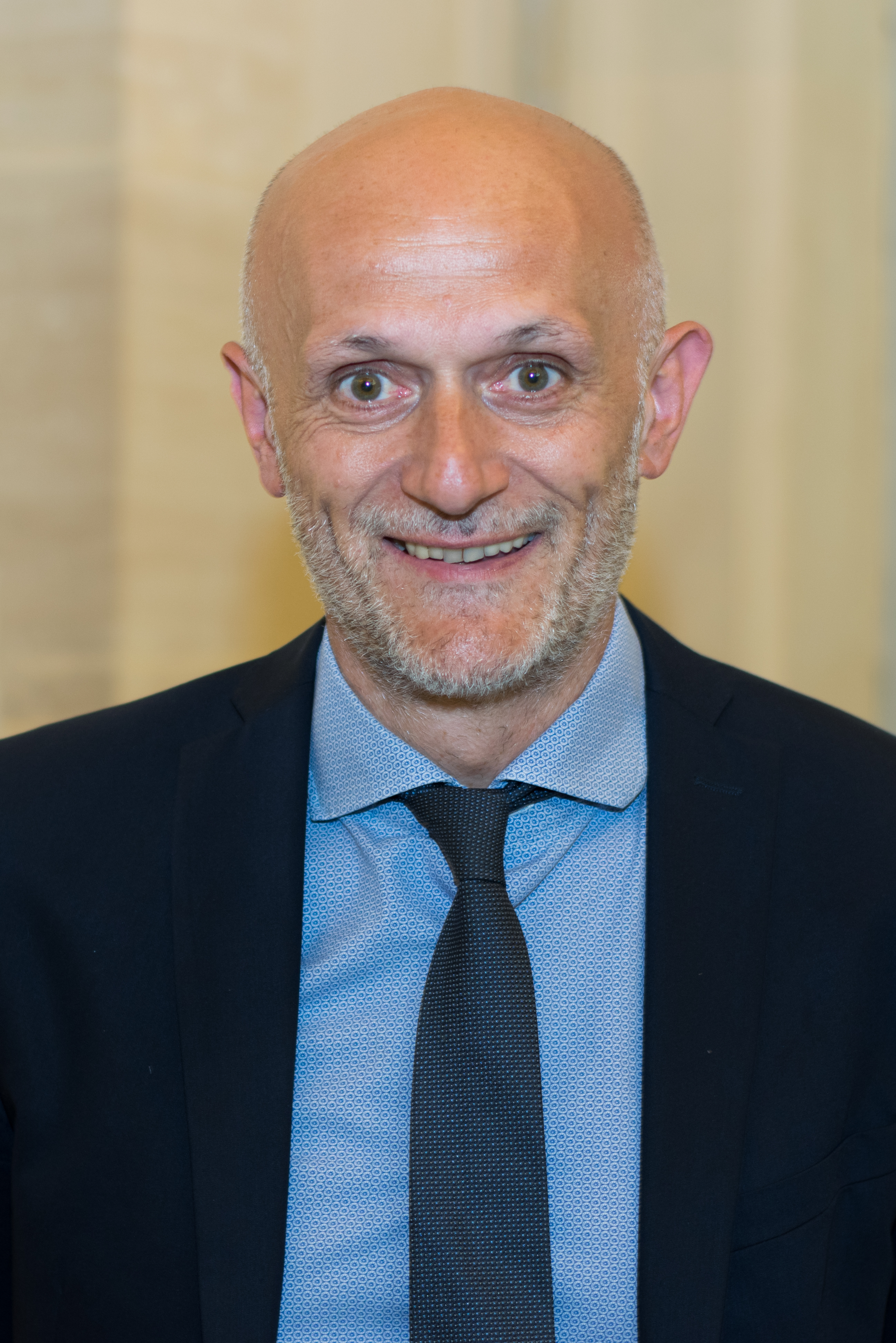

Mayor of Rodez
- Incumbent
- Assumed office 27 March 2026
- Preceded by: Christian Teyssèdre

Member of the National Assembly for Aveyron's 1st constituency
- In office 21 June 2017 – 26 April 2026
- Preceded by: Yves Censi
- Succeeded by: Pauline Cestrières

Senator for Aveyron
- In office 22 July 2012 – 2 May 2014
- Preceded by: Anne-Marie Escoffier
- Succeeded by: Anne-Marie Escoffier

Personal details
- Born: 25 March 1969 (age 57) Saint-Yrieix-la-Perche, France
- Party: Renaissance
- Education: University of Montpellier 1

Stéphane Mazars (French pronunciation: [stefan mazaʁ]; born 25 March 1969) is a French lawyer and politician of Renaissance (RE) who has served as mayor of Rodez since 2026. He previously represented Aveyron in the Senate (2012–2014) and in the National Assembly (2017–2026).

== Political career ==
In parliament, Mazars serves as member of the Committee on Legal Affairs. In this capacity, he was the parliament's rapporteur on a 2021 reform of France's procedural law proposed by Minister of Justice Éric Dupond-Moretti.

In addition to his committee assignments, Mazars is part of the parliamentary friendship groups with Gabon, Kosovo and Turkey.

== Political positions ==
In July 2019, Mazars decided not to align with his parliamentary group's majority and became one of 52 LREM members who abstained from a vote on the French ratification of the European Union’s Comprehensive Economic and Trade Agreement (CETA) with Canada.
