= Canton of Ceor-Ségala =

Coordinates: 44.28°N 2.43°E

- Canton
- Situation of the canton of Ceor-Ségala in the department of Aveyron
- Country: France
- Region: Occitania
- Department: Aveyron
- No. of communes: {{{nbcomm}}}
- Population (2023): 14,211
- INSEE code: 1205

The canton of Ceor-Ségala is an administrative division of the Aveyron department, southern France. It was created at the French canton reorganisation which came into effect in March 2015. Its seat is in Baraqueville.

It consists of the following communes:

1. Baraqueville
2. Boussac
3. Cabanès
4. Camboulazet
5. Camjac
6. Castanet
7. Centrès
8. Colombiès
9. Gramond
10. Manhac
11. Meljac
12. Moyrazès
13. Naucelle
14. Pradinas
15. Quins
16. Saint-Just-sur-Viaur
17. Sauveterre-de-Rouergue
18. Tauriac-de-Naucelle
