= Aveyron's 1st constituency =

Constituency of the National Assembly of France

1st constituency of the Aveyron
- inline Constituency of the National Assembly of France

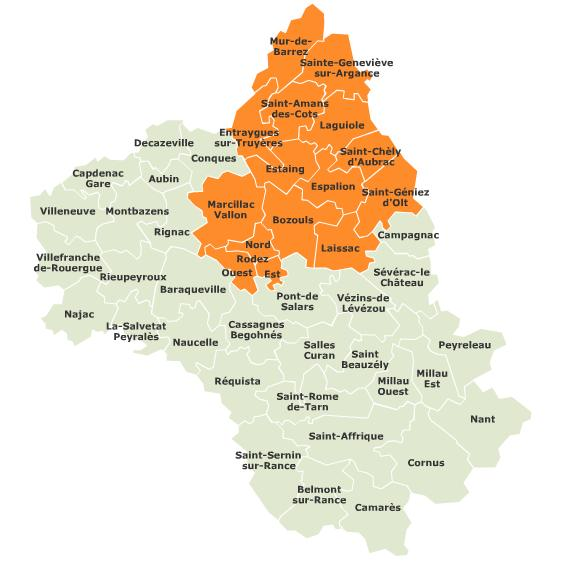
- Deputy: Stéphane Mazars; RE
- Department: Aveyron
- Cantons: Aubin, Baraqueville-Sauveterre, Capdenac-Gare, Conques, Decazeville, Montbazens, Najac, Naucelle, Rieupeyroux, Rignac, La Salvetat-Peyralès, Villefranche-de-Rouergue, Villeneuve
- Registered voters: 100,998

The 1st constituency of the Aveyron is a French legislative constituency in the Aveyron département.

== Deputies ==
Election	Member	Party
1958	Roland Boscary-Monsservin	CNIP
1962	Roland Boscary-Monsservin	RI
1967	Roland Boscary-Monsservin	RI
1968	Roland Boscary-Monsservin	RI
1971	Jean Briane	CD
1973	Jean Briane	CD
1978	Jean Briane	UDF
1981	Jean Briane	UDF
1986	Proportional representation - no election by constituency	
1988	Jean Briane	UDF
1993	Jean Briane	UDF
1997	Jean Briane	UDF
2002	Yves Censi	UMP
2007	Yves Censi	UMP
2012	Yves Censi	UMP
2017	Stéphane Mazars	LREM
2022	Stéphane Mazars	LREM
2024	Stéphane Mazars	RE

== Election results ==
=== 2024 ===
Candidate	Party	Alliance	First round			Second round		
Candidate	Party	Alliance	Votes	%	+/–	Votes	%	+/–
Stéphane Mazars	RE	Ensemble	24,349	43.58	+1.12	34,706	65.17	+1.34
Jean-Philippe Chartier	RN		17,586	31.48	+18.35	18,548	34.83	new
Léon Thebault	LE	NFP	12,702	22.74	+1.19	withdrew		
Antoine Da Cruz	RES		811	1.45	-1.94			
Arlette Saint-Avit	LO		418	0.75	-0.08			
Votes			55,866	100.00		53,254	100.00	
Valid votes			55,866	96.69	-0.88	53,254	94.06	+2.72
Blank votes			1,310	2.27	+0.60	2,397	4.23	-1.64
Null votes			602	1.04	+0.28	966	1.71	-1.09
Turnout			57,778	73.75	+19.43	56,617	72.26	+21.47
Abstentions			20,567	26.25	-19.43	21,734	27.74	-21.47
Registered voters			78,345			78,351		
Result			RE HOLD					

=== 2022 ===
Legislative Election 2022: Aveyron's 1st constituency
Party	Candidate	Votes	%	±%
LREM (Ensemble)	Stéphane Mazars	17,580	42.46	-3.46
EELV (NUPÉS)	Léon Thebault	8,923	21.55	+1.56
LR (UDC)	Magali Bessaou	5,436	13.13	−9.70
RN	Julia Plane	5,391	13.02	+5.59
REC	Godefroy Bes De Berc	1,409	3.40	N/A
R!	Antoine Da Cruz	1,405	3.39	N/A
Others	N/A	1,262	3.05	
Turnout		41,406	54.32	−3.89
2nd round result
LREM (Ensemble)	Stéphane Mazars	23,138	63.83	-2.54
EELV (NUPÉS)	Léon Thebault	13,113	36.17	N/A
Turnout		36,251	50.79	+0.02
LREM hold				

=== 2017 ===
Candidate	Label	First round		Second round	
Candidate	Label	Votes	%	Votes	%
Stéphane Mazars	LREM	19,962	45.92	23,217	66.37
Yves Censi	LR	9,923	22.83	11,763	33.63
Pierre Defontaines	FI	4,756	10.94		
Sarah Vidal	PS	3,569	8.21		
Matthieu Danen	FN	3,232	7.43		
Christian Lammens	ECO	937	2.16		
Anne Minier	PCF	367	0.84		
Michel Raynal	ECO	335	0.77		
Valérie Vagner	DIV	202	0.46		
Arlette Saint-Avit	EXG	188	0.43		
Votes		43,471	100.00	34,980	100.00
Valid votes		43,471	97.72	34,980	90.18
Blank votes		695	1.56	2,623	6.76
Null votes		317	0.71	1,185	3.06
Turnout		44,483	58.21	38,788	50.77
Abstentions		31,931	41.79	37,609	49.23
Registered voters		76,414		76,397	
Source: Ministry of the Interior

=== 2012 ===
Summary of the 10 June and 17 June 2012 French legislative in Aveyron’s 1st Constituency election results
Candidate	Party		1st round		2nd round	
Candidate	Party		Votes	%	Votes	%
Yves Censi	Union for a Popular Movement	UMP	19,487	39.83%	24,311	50.67%
Monique Bultel-Herment	Socialist Party	PS	13,829	28.27%	23,666	49.33%
Stéphane Mazars	Radical Party of the Left	PRG	6,938	14.18%		
Jean-Guillaume Remise	National Front	FN	3,990	8.16%		
Guilhem Serieys	Left Front	FG	2,708	5.54%		
Bruno Berardi	The Greens	VEC	1,478	3.02%		
Marie-Line Faixa	Ecologist	ECO	337	0.69%		
Arlette Saint-Avit	Far Left	EXG	158	0.32%		
Total			48,925	100%	47,977	100%
Registered voters			75,452		75,453	
Blank/Void ballots			872	1.75%	1,645	3.32%
Turnout			49,797	66.00%	49,622	65.77%
Abstentions			25,655	34.00%	25,831	34.23%
Result					UMP HOLD	

=== 2007 ===
Summary of the 10 June and 17 June 2007 French legislative in Aveyron’s 1st Constituency election results
Candidate	Party		1st round		2nd round	
Candidate	Party		Votes	%	Votes	%
Yves Censi	Union for a Popular Movement	UMP	17,414	35.15%	26,085	53.31%
Christian Teyssedre	Socialist Party	PS	14,409	29.08%	22,846	46.69%
Thierry Puech	Majorité Présidentielle		6,535	13.19%		
Maïté Laur	Democratic Movement	MoDem	5,519	11.14%		
Marie-Claude Carlin	The Greens	VEC	1,359	2.74%		
Jean-Léon Miquel	National Front	FN	975	1.97%		
Marie-Cécile Perillat	Far Left	EXG	934	1.89%		
Sylvie Foulquier	Communist	COM	741	1.50%		
Jean-Robert Evesque	Hunting, Fishing, Nature, Traditions	CPNT	641	1.29%		
Claire-Marie Garboulin	Ecologist	ECO	388	0.78%		
Ingrid Lebeau	Divers	DIV	282	0.57%		
Arlette Saint-Avit	Far Left	EXG	217	0.44%		
Nicolle le Marchand	Far Right	EXD	129	0.26%		
Total			49,543	100%	48,931	100%
Registered voters			74,596		74,595	
Blank/Void ballots			1,218	2.40%	1,811	3.57%
Turnout			50,761	68.05%	50,742	68.02%
Abstentions			23,835	31.95%	23,853	31.98%
Result					UMP HOLD	

=== 2002 ===
Legislative Election 2002: Aveyron's 1st constituency
Party	Candidate	Votes	%	±%
PS	Anne-Marie Cluzel	12,170	24.18	−1.64
UMP	Yves Censi	12,145	24.13	+10.50
DVD	Regine Taussat	8,526	16.94	N/A
DL	Jean-Claude Luche	5,930	11.78	N/A
FN	Marie-Claire de la Sayette	2,973	5.91	−2.50
DVD	Maite Laur	2,230	4.43	N/A
LV	Marie-Claude Carlin	1,124	2.23	−4.01
CPNT	Helene Combes-Dumas	1,067	2.12	N/A
Others	N/A	4,164		
Turnout		51,716	71.26	
2nd round result
UMP	Yves Censi	26,068	56.78	N/A
PS	Anne-Marie Cluzel	19,840	43.22	−0.48
Turnout		48,255	66.50	
UMP gain from UDF				

=== 1997 ===
Legislative Election 1997: Aveyron's 1st constituency
Party	Candidate	Votes	%	±%
UDF	Jean Briane	12,256	25.82	
PS	Anne Her	11,121	23.43	
UDF	François Rey	6,475	13.64	
RPR	Régine Taussat	6,467	13.63	
FN	Olivier Carrasco	3,990	8.41	
LV	Marie-Claude Carlin	2,961	6.24	
PCF	Guy Drillin	2,542	5.36	
Others	N/A	1,648		
Turnout		50,463	72.48	
2nd round result
UDF	Jean Briane	27,184	56.30	
PS	Anne Her	21,098	43.70	
Turnout		51,384	73.81	
UDF hold				

== Sources ==
- Official results of French elections from 1998: "Résultats électoraux officiels en France" (in French). Archived from the original on 20 December 2011.
- French Interior Ministry results website: "Résultats électoraux officiels en France" (in French).
