= Tauriac-de-Naucelle =

Commune in Occitanie, France

- Commune
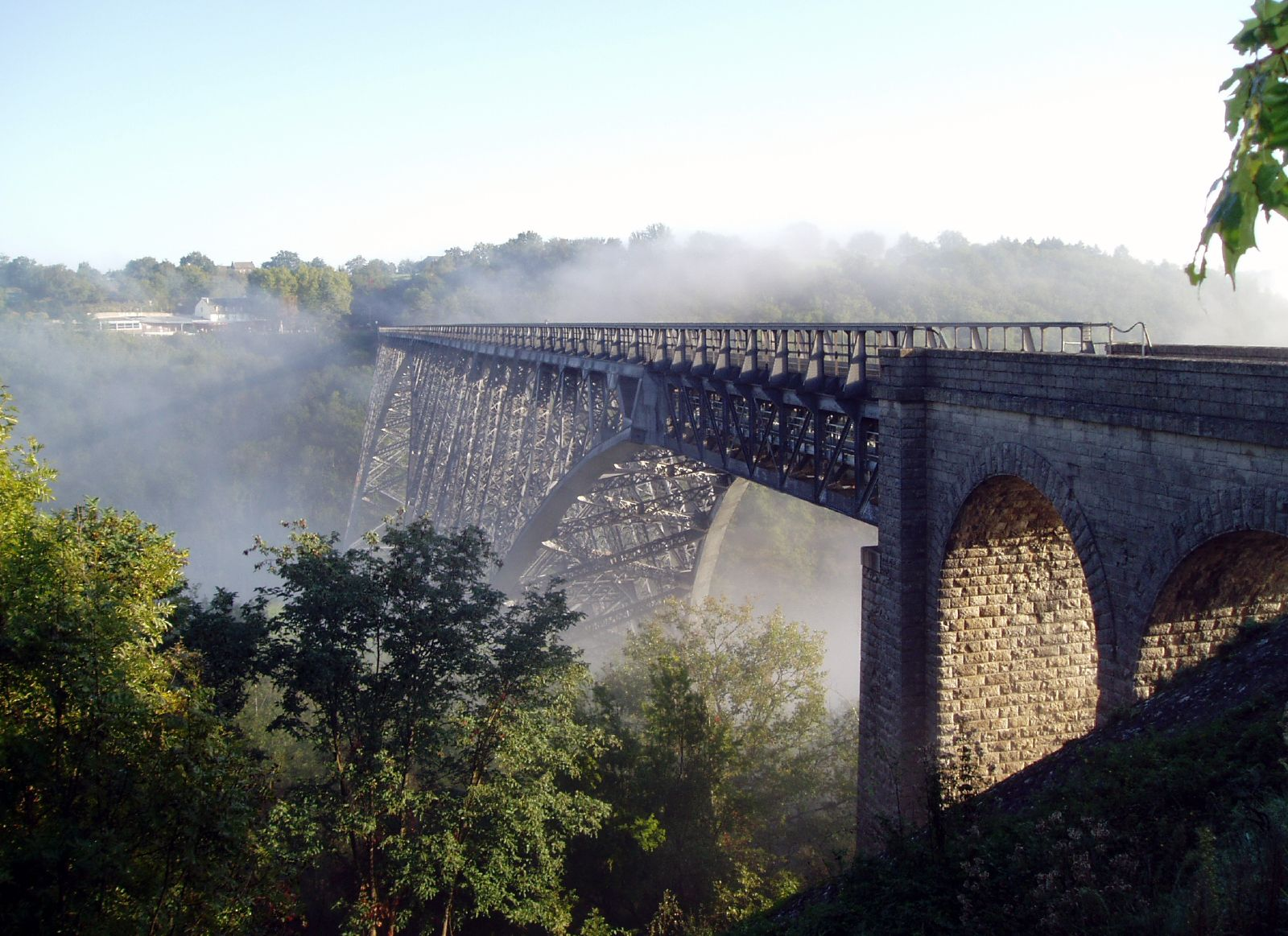
- Viaur rail viaduct

- Coat of arms
- Location of Tauriac-de-Naucelle
- Location within France Location within Occitanie
- Coordinates: 44°09′20″N 2°20′14″E
- Country: France
- Region: Occitania
- Department: Aveyron
- Arrondissement: Villefranche-de-Rouergue
- Canton: Ceor-Ségala

Government
  - Mayor (2020–2026): Jean-Luc Tarroux
- Area^{1}: 21.59 km^{2} (8.34 sq mi)
- Elevation: 450 m (1,480 ft)
- Highest elevation: 505 m (1,657 ft)
- Lowest elevation: 293 m (961 ft)
- Population (2023): 398
  - Density: 18.4/km^{2} (47.7/sq mi)
- Time zone: UTC+01:00 (CET)
  - Summer (DST): UTC+02:00 (CEST)
- INSEE/Postal code: 12276 /12800
- ^{1} French Land Register data, which excludes lakes, ponds, glaciers > 1 km^{2} (0.386 sq mi or 247 acres) and river estuaries.

Tauriac-de-Naucelle (French pronunciation: [toʁjak də nosɛl], literally Tauriac of Naucelle; Occitan: Tauriac de Naucèla) is a commune in the Aveyron department in southern France.

== Population ==
Historical population
Year	Pop.	±% p.a.
1968	570	—
1975	523	−1.22%
1982	452	−2.06%
1990	365	−2.64%
1999	354	−0.34%
2007	385	+1.05%
2012	363	−1.17%
2017	372	+0.49%
2023	398	+1.13%
Source: INSEE

== See also ==
- Communes of the Aveyron department
