= Castanet, Aveyron =

Commune in Occitanie, France

Castanet
- Commune
- Location of Castanet
- Location within France Location within Occitanie
- Coordinates: 44°16′44″N 2°17′27″E
- Country: France
- Region: Occitania
- Department: Aveyron
- Arrondissement: Villefranche-de-Rouergue
- Canton: Ceor-Ségala

Government
  - Mayor (2020–2026): Jean-Marc Fabre
- Area^{1}: 30.42 km^{2} (11.75 sq mi)
- Elevation: 680 m (2,230 ft)
- Highest elevation: 744 m (2,441 ft)
- Lowest elevation: 436 m (1,430 ft)
- Population (2023): 533
  - Density: 17.5/km^{2} (45.4/sq mi)
- Time zone: UTC+01:00 (CET)
  - Summer (DST): UTC+02:00 (CEST)
- INSEE/Postal code: 12059 /12240
- ^{1} French Land Register data, which excludes lakes, ponds, glaciers > 1 km^{2} (0.386 sq mi or 247 acres) and river estuaries.

Castanet is a commune in the Aveyron department in southern France.

== Population ==
Historical population
Year	Pop.	±% p.a.
1968	802	—
1975	734	−1.26%
1982	656	−1.59%
1990	591	−1.30%
1999	524	−1.33%
2007	546	+0.52%
2012	532	−0.52%
2017	513	−0.72%
2023	533	+0.64%
Source: INSEE

== See also ==
- Communes of the Aveyron department
