= Ozil de Cadartz =

French troubadour

Ozil de Cadartz was a French troubadour known for only one surviving canso, "Assatz es dregz, pos jois no.m pot venir". It is an ironic text, perhaps parodying the excessive rules of courtly love.

Saverio Guida has suggested that the troubadour is the same person as the youngest son of the family of Bertran, the lord of Cadars in the Rouergue. This Ozil, or Odil, first appears in a charter of donation dated 1160. His eldest brother, also Bertran, and his father can be traced down to 1180, and his other elder brother, Armancz (Armand), down to 1200. Ozil's dates can only be estimated on this basis.
