= Bernard Seillier =

French politician (1941–2024)

Member of the French Senate for Aveyron
- In office 1 October 1989 – 30 September 2008

Mayor of Sévérac-le-Château
- In office 1994–2008
- Preceded by: Raymond Viala
- Succeeded by: Camille Galibert

Personal details
- Born: 12 July 1941 Saint-Céré, France
- Died: 2 August 2024 (aged 83)
- Party: MPF
- Education: École nationale d'administration
- Occupation: Government official

Bernard Seillier (12 July 1941 – 2 August 2024) was a French government official and politician of the Movement for France (MPF).

== Biography ==
Born in Saint-Céré on 12 July 1941, Seillier studied economic sciences at the École nationale d'administration. He entered civil servitude following his studies. He was married to Françoise Seillier, who served as a Member of the European Parliament from 1994 to 1999. His daughter was married to the son of Philippe de Villiers. He was also the father of Bruno Seillier, a screenwriter. From 1989 to 2008, he served in the Senate, where he sat in the European Democratic and Social Rally group.

Seillier died on 2 August 2024, at the age of 83.
