= Manhac =

Commune in Occitanie, France

- Commune
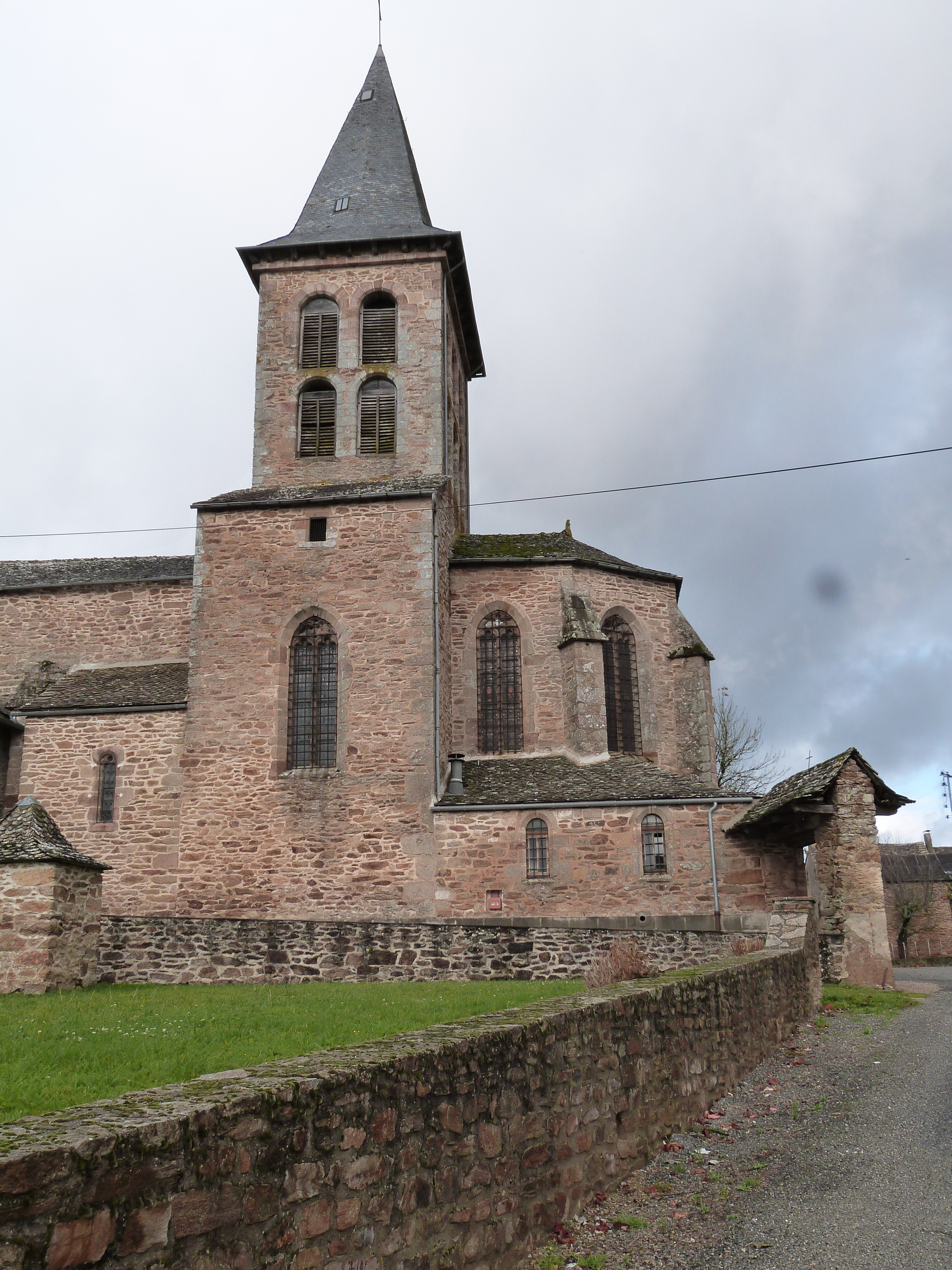
- The church in Manhac
- Location of Manhac
- Location within France Location within Occitanie
- Coordinates: 44°15′20″N 2°28′12″E
- Country: France
- Region: Occitania
- Department: Aveyron
- Arrondissement: Villefranche-de-Rouergue
- Canton: Ceor-Ségala

Government
  - Mayor (2020–2026): Bernard Calmels
- Area^{1}: 1.5 km^{2} (0.58 sq mi)
- Elevation: 630 m (2,070 ft)
- Highest elevation: 793 m (2,602 ft)
- Lowest elevation: 459 m (1,506 ft)
- Population (2023): 877
  - Density: 580/km^{2} (1,500/sq mi)
- Time zone: UTC+01:00 (CET)
  - Summer (DST): UTC+02:00 (CEST)
- INSEE/Postal code: 12137 /12160
- ^{1} French Land Register data, which excludes lakes, ponds, glaciers > 1 km^{2} (0.386 sq mi or 247 acres) and river estuaries.

Manhac is a commune in the Aveyron department in southern France.

== Population ==
Historical population
Year	Pop.	±% p.a.
1968	544	—
1975	505	−1.06%
1982	442	−1.89%
1990	375	−2.03%
1999	504	+3.34%
2007	626	+2.75%
2012	751	+3.71%
2017	819	+1.75%
2023	877	+1.15%
Source: INSEE

== See also ==
- Communes of the Aveyron department
