= Martha Cabanne Kayser =

American utopian novelist

- Born: September 27, 1872; St. Louis
- Died: May 14, 1966 (aged 93); Long Beach

Martha Mitchell Cabanne Kayser Brown (September 27, 1872 – May 14, 1966) was an American utopian novelist.

Martha Mitchell Cabanne was the daughter of St. Louis businessman Joseph Charles Cabanne and Susan Martha Preston Christy Mitchell. She married Robert Lee Kayser in 1893.

Her first novel was The Aerial Flight to the Realm of Peace (1922), where two characters take a balloon flight to another planet. They discover a peaceful, egalitarian utopia and vow to never return to Earth. Her second was Faith (1931), later republished as Heaven is Here (1938). She adapted it for the stage as The Way, which premiered at the Cherry Lane Theatre on October 11, 1940. Faith Morton (played by Eve Casanova) is the headmistress of a Naples school who campaigns for world peace through her students, sheer willpower, and positive thinking. The play was poorly received; by the second act the audience "began to participate vocally in the proceedings."

Martha Kayser died on May 14, 1966 in Long Beach, California.

== Bibliography ==
- The Aerial Flight to the Realm of Peace (St Louis, Missouri: Lincoln Press and Publishing Co, 1922)
- Faith (Boston, Massachusetts: Meador Publishing Co, 1931)
