= Sauveterre-de-Rouergue =

Commune in Occitanie, France

- Commune
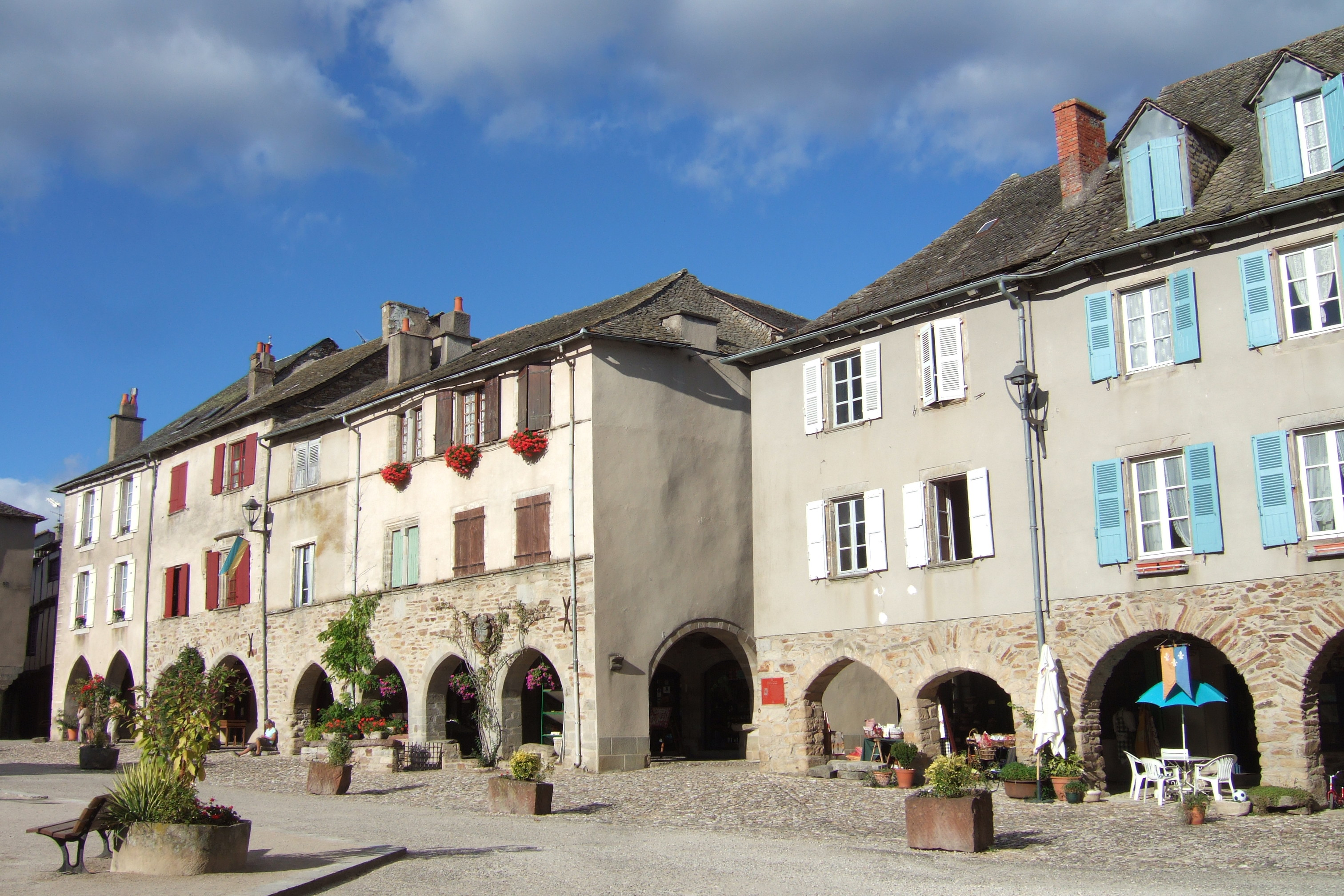
- The main square in Sauveterre-de-Rouergue

- Coat of arms
- Location of Sauveterre-de-Rouergue
- Location within France Location within Occitanie
- Coordinates: 44°13′18″N 2°19′07″E
- Country: France
- Region: Occitania
- Department: Aveyron
- Arrondissement: Villefranche-de-Rouergue
- Canton: Ceor-Ségala

Government
  - Mayor (2020–2026): René Mouysset
- Area^{1}: 23.43 km^{2} (9.05 sq mi)
- Elevation: 466 m (1,529 ft)
- Highest elevation: 682 m (2,238 ft)
- Lowest elevation: 333 m (1,093 ft)
- Population (2023): 709
  - Density: 30.3/km^{2} (78.4/sq mi)
- Time zone: UTC+01:00 (CET)
  - Summer (DST): UTC+02:00 (CEST)
- INSEE/Postal code: 12262 /12800
- ^{1} French Land Register data, which excludes lakes, ponds, glaciers > 1 km^{2} (0.386 sq mi or 247 acres) and river estuaries.

Sauveterre-de-Rouergue (French pronunciation: [sovtɛʁ də ʁwɛʁɡ], literally Sauveterre of Rouergue; Occitan: Sauvatèrra, before 1962: Sauveterre) is a commune in the Aveyron department in southern France. It is one of the Les Plus Beaux Villages de France (most beautiful villages of France).

== Population ==
Historical population
Year	Pop.	±% p.a.
1968	964	—
1975	891	−1.12%
1982	793	−1.65%
1990	888	+1.42%
1999	832	−0.72%
2007	803	−0.44%
2012	793	−0.25%
2017	777	−0.41%
2023	709	−1.51%
Source: INSEE

== See also ==
- Communes of the Aveyron department
