= Pradinas =

Commune in Occitanie, France

- Commune
- Location of Pradinas
- Location within France Location within Occitanie
- Coordinates: 44°14′27″N 2°15′51″E
- Country: France
- Region: Occitania
- Department: Aveyron
- Arrondissement: Villefranche-de-Rouergue
- Canton: Ceor-Ségala

Government
  - Mayor (2020–2026): François Vabre
- Area^{1}: 22.68 km^{2} (8.76 sq mi)
- Elevation: 540 m (1,770 ft)
- Highest elevation: 652 m (2,139 ft)
- Lowest elevation: 325 m (1,066 ft)
- Population (2023): 369
  - Density: 16.3/km^{2} (42.1/sq mi)
- Time zone: UTC+01:00 (CET)
  - Summer (DST): UTC+02:00 (CEST)
- INSEE/Postal code: 12189 /12240
- ^{1} French Land Register data, which excludes lakes, ponds, glaciers > 1 km^{2} (0.386 sq mi or 247 acres) and river estuaries.

Pradinas is a commune located in the Aveyron department in southern France.

== Population ==
Historical population
Year	Pop.	±% p.a.
1968	622	—
1975	583	−0.92%
1982	508	−1.95%
1990	420	−2.35%
1999	389	−0.85%
2007	369	−0.66%
2012	370	+0.05%
2017	360	−0.55%
2023	369	+0.41%
Source: INSEE

== See also ==
- Communes of the Aveyron department
