= Cabanes =

Cabanes may refer to:

== Places ==
- Cabanes, Castellón, municipality in the province of Castellón, Valencian Community, Spain
- Cabanes, Girona, (also Cabanas), municipality in the province of Girona, Catalonia, Spain
- Cabanès, Aveyron, commune in France
- Cabanès, Tarn, commune in France

== People ==
- Amparo Cabanes Pecourt (born 1938), Spanish academic and politician
- Augustin Cabanès (1862–1928), French doctor and historian
- José Cabanes, Genovés II (born 1981), Valencian pilota player
- Paco Cabanes Pastor, Genovés I (1954–2021), Valencian pilota player

== See also ==
- Cabanès (disambiguation)
- Cabannes (disambiguation)
- Cabana (disambiguation)
