= Jean Cabannes (magistrate) =

French jurist (1925–2020)

- Born: 2 March 1925; Mirande, France
- Died: 1 July 2020 (aged 95)
- Occupation: Jurist

Jean Cabannes (French pronunciation: [ʒɑ̃ kaban]; 2 March 1925 – 1 July 2020) was a French magistrate and jurist. He was best known for being a member of the French Constitutional Council.

== Biography ==
Following his studies, Cabannes first worked as a trainee lawyer in Toulouse. He then worked in Saint-Flour for a year before starting work for the Ministry of Justice. From 1958 to 1969, he worked for the Grand Chancellery of the Legion of Honour as a secretary general. Simultaneously, he worked at the Ordre national du Mérite from 1964 to 1969. He was an attorney general with the Court of Appeal of Paris from 1969 to 1976, then started working as an advisor to the Court of Cassation in 1976.

From 1977 to 1980, Cabannes worked in the cabinet of former Minister of Justice Alain Peyrefitte. In 1981, he was appointed First Attorney General to the Court of Cassation, a position he kept until 1989, when he gained retirement rights. He then became Honorary Attorney General.

In 1987, Prime Minister Jacques Chirac appointed Cabannes leader of a taskforce assessing the toxic relationship between the police and gendarmes. In 1989, he was appointed to the Constitutional Council by Senate President Alain Poher. In 2003, Minister of Justice Dominique Perben entrusted Cabannes with a "reflection committee on ethics in the judiciary".

Outside of his judicial career, Cabannes served as Vice-President of the Les Amitiés de la Résistance.

Jean Cabannes died on 1 July at the age of 95.

== Distinction ==
- Grand Cross of the Legion of Honor (2008)

== Publications ==
- Le personnel gouvernemental sous la Cinquième République (1959–1986) (1998)
- Principes de justice: mélanges en l'honneur de Jean-François Burgelin (2008)
