= Cabana (chocolate bar) =

Chocolate bar produced by Rowntree's

Cabana was a chocolate bar produced by Rowntree's, combining coconut, caramel, cherries inside a milk chocolate outer layer.

It was first produced in the 1980s It was discontinued in the early 1990s.

The television ad used a version of the song "Day-O (The Banana Boat Song)" (as sung by Harry Belafonte), with the words "Come mister magic man, make me a Cabana", and the strap line was "tropical magic".
