= Olivia Fox Cabane =

French American author

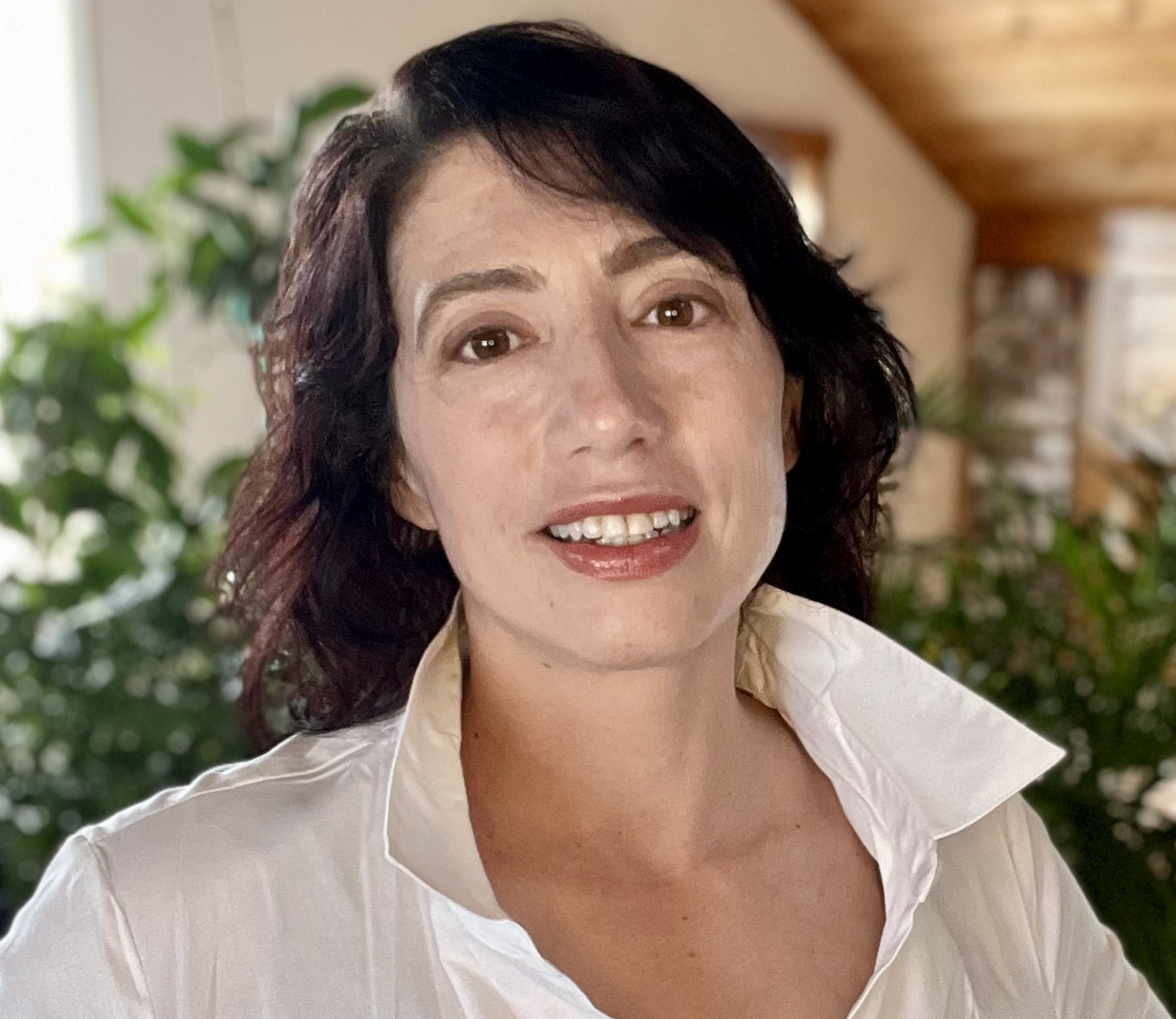
- Cabane in 2023
- Born: 1978 or 1979 (age 46–47); Paris, France
- Citizenship: USA, France
- Education: Panthéon-Assas University
- Occupations: Author, public speaker, cofounder of KindEarth.Tech
- Writing career
- Notable work: The Charisma Myth
- Website: www.askolivia.com

Alice Olivia Fox Cabane is a French and American author, public speaker, and the co-founder of The KindEarth.Tech (KET) Foundation. She is the former Director of Innovative Leadership for Stanford University's student accelerator, StartX. She is the author of The Charisma Myth and the co-author of The Net And The Butterfly, two books on charisma and the neuroscience of innovation, respectively.

== Life and career ==
Cabane was born in Paris, France, to French physicist Bernard Cabane and American psychotherapist Celie Fox. She is autistic.

Cabane earned degrees in French and European business law from the Pantheon-Assas University and in German business law from LMU Munich.

Cabane has worked with several universities to teach courses or direct programs. Her course at the University of California's Haas School of Business, where she led a series of workshops which cover techniques she originally developed for Harvard University and the Massachusetts Institute of Technology, was so popular that university staff had to guard the classroom entrance to make sure only students admitted to that course could have a seat. From 2013 to 2015, she was the Director of Innovative Leadership at StartX, a startup accelerator at Stanford University.

Cabane has been featured and quoted in The Wall Street Journal, the New York Times, and the BBC. She has written for Forbes and The Huffington Post. She has been on the Board of Editors of one of the National Law Journal publications. She is the youngest person ever to have been appointed foreign trade advisor to the French Government since the role was created in 1898.

Along with Ira Van Eelen, daughter of clean meat inventor Willem van Eelen, she founded KindEarth.Tech (KET), a foundation focusing on accelerating the global shift to a sustainable food system. She has produced a series of infographics showcasing the development of the alternative protein and dairy industries.

== Publications ==
Cabane's first book, The Charisma Myth, was published by Penguin/Random House in 2012. In this book, the model of charisma she proposes is described as the combination of three elements: presence, power and warmth.

In 2017, Cabane co-wrote a book on increasing innovation in entrepreneurs with Judah Pollack, another consultant for prominent organizations. This book continues her models of cultivating skills – this time, leadership – paired with exercises to develop those skills.

- The Charisma Myth, Penguin, 2012
- The Net And The Butterfly, Penguin, 2017
