= Meljac =

Commune in Occitanie, France

- Commune
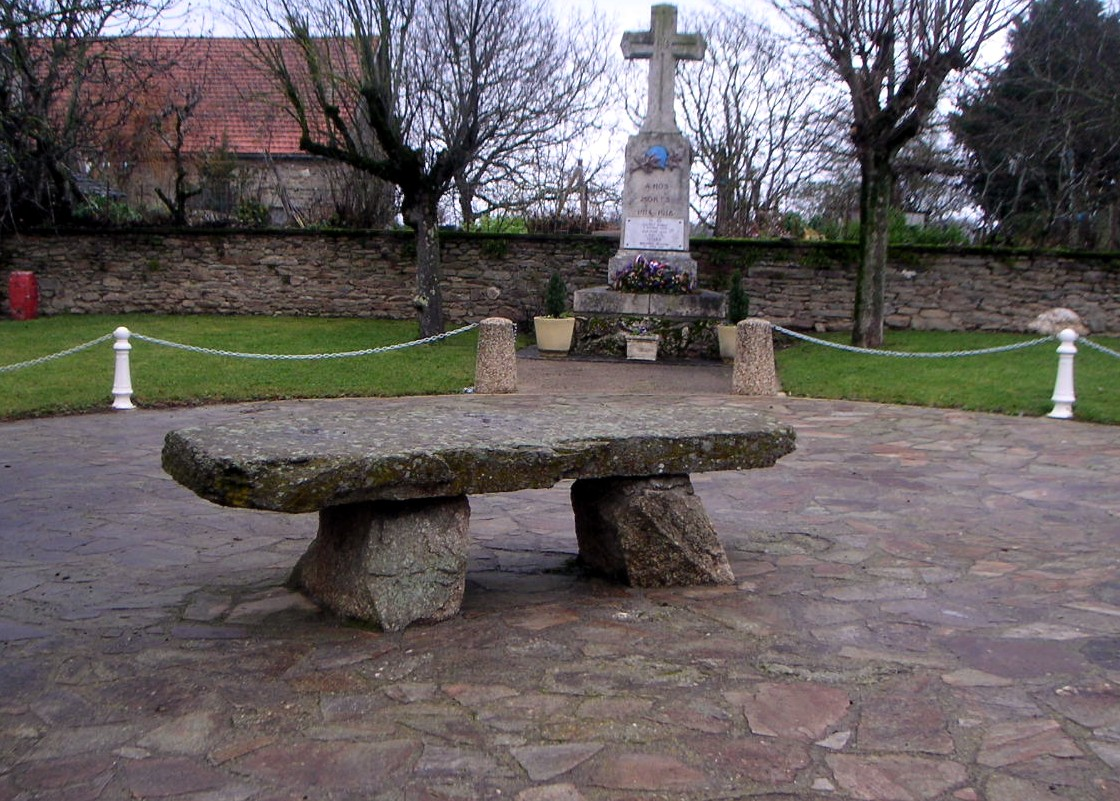
- Dolmen

- Coat of arms
- Location of Meljac
- Location within France Location within Occitanie
- Coordinates: 44°08′22″N 2°26′10″E
- Country: France
- Region: Occitania
- Department: Aveyron
- Arrondissement: Villefranche-de-Rouergue
- Canton: Ceor-Ségala

Government
  - Mayor (2020–2026): Pierre Bousquet
- Area^{1}: 9.54 km^{2} (3.68 sq mi)
- Elevation: 583 m (1,913 ft)
- Highest elevation: 608 m (1,995 ft)
- Lowest elevation: 350 m (1,150 ft)
- Population (2023): 141
  - Density: 14.8/km^{2} (38.3/sq mi)
- Time zone: UTC+01:00 (CET)
  - Summer (DST): UTC+02:00 (CEST)
- INSEE/Postal code: 12144 /12120
- ^{1} French Land Register data, which excludes lakes, ponds, glaciers > 1 km^{2} (0.386 sq mi or 247 acres) and river estuaries.

Meljac (French pronunciation: [mɛlʒak]) is a commune in the Aveyron department in southern France.

== Geography ==
The river Céor forms all of the commune's northern border.

== Population ==
Historical population
Year	Pop.	±% p.a.
1968	281	—
1975	250	−1.66%
1982	233	−1.00%
1990	217	−0.89%
1999	155	−3.67%
2007	144	−0.92%
2012	140	−0.56%
2017	130	−1.47%
2023	141	+1.36%
Source: INSEE

== See also ==
- Communes of the Aveyron department
