= Moyrazès =

Commune in Occitanie, France

- Commune
- Coat of arms
- Location of Moyrazès
- Location within France Location within Occitanie
- Coordinates: 44°20′39″N 2°26′25″E
- Country: France
- Region: Occitania
- Department: Aveyron
- Arrondissement: Villefranche-de-Rouergue
- Canton: Ceor-Ségala

Government
  - Mayor (2020–2026): Michel Artus
- Area^{1}: 48.67 km^{2} (18.79 sq mi)
- Elevation: 730 m (2,400 ft)
- Highest elevation: 773 m (2,536 ft)
- Lowest elevation: 430 m (1,410 ft)
- Population (2023): 1,095
  - Density: 22.50/km^{2} (58.27/sq mi)
- Time zone: UTC+01:00 (CET)
  - Summer (DST): UTC+02:00 (CEST)
- INSEE/Postal code: 12162 /12160
- ^{1} French Land Register data, which excludes lakes, ponds, glaciers > 1 km^{2} (0.386 sq mi or 247 acres) and river estuaries.

Moyrazès (French pronunciation: [mwaʁazɛs]; Occitan: Moirasés) is a commune in the Aveyron department in southern France.

== Population ==
Historical population
Year	Pop.	±% p.a.
1968	1,367	—
1975	1,284	−0.89%
1982	1,130	−1.81%
1990	1,087	−0.48%
1999	1,109	+0.22%
2007	1,099	−0.11%
2012	1,135	+0.65%
2017	1,109	−0.46%
2023	1,095	−0.21%
Source: INSEE

== See also ==
- Communes of the Aveyron department
