= Colombiès =

Commune in Occitanie, France

- Commune
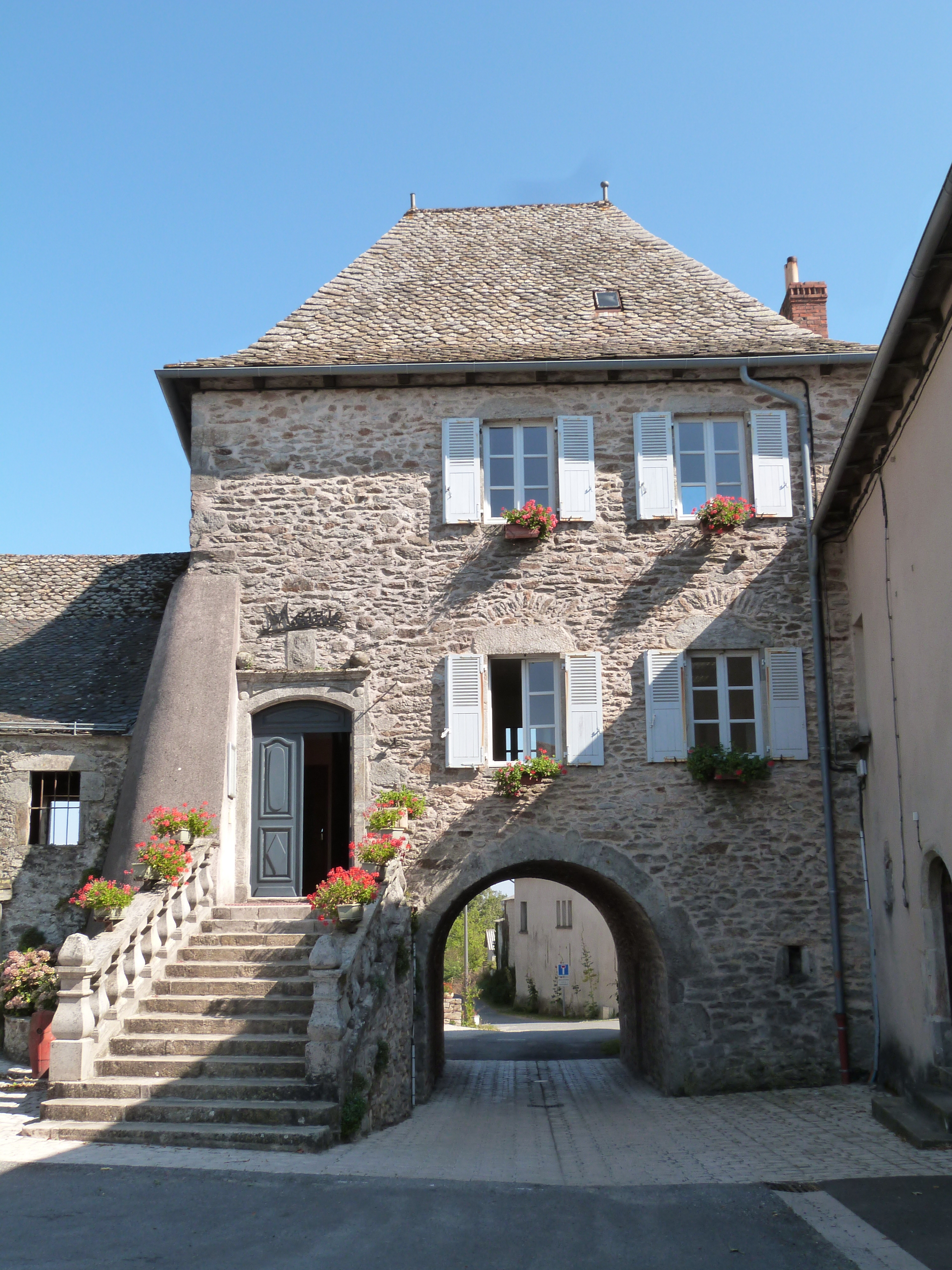
- Town hall

- Coat of arms
- Location of Colombiès
- Location within France Location within Occitanie
- Coordinates: 44°20′46″N 2°20′20″E
- Country: France
- Region: Occitania
- Department: Aveyron
- Arrondissement: Villefranche-de-Rouergue
- Canton: Ceor-Ségala

Government
  - Mayor (2020–2026): Patrick Alcouffe
- Area^{1}: 55.23 km^{2} (21.32 sq mi)
- Elevation: 700 m (2,300 ft)
- Highest elevation: 751 m (2,464 ft)
- Lowest elevation: 390 m (1,280 ft)
- Population (2023): 884
  - Density: 16.0/km^{2} (41.5/sq mi)
- Time zone: UTC+01:00 (CET)
  - Summer (DST): UTC+02:00 (CEST)
- INSEE/Postal code: 12068 /12240
- ^{1} French Land Register data, which excludes lakes, ponds, glaciers > 1 km^{2} (0.386 sq mi or 247 acres) and river estuaries.

Colombiès (French pronunciation: [kɔlɔ̃bjɛs]; Occitan: Colombièrs) is a commune in the Aveyron department in southern France.

== Population ==
Historical population
Year	Pop.	±% p.a.
1968	1,657	—
1975	1,446	−1.93%
1982	1,234	−2.24%
1990	1,096	−1.47%
1999	984	−1.19%
2007	950	−0.44%
2012	934	−0.34%
2017	903	−0.67%
2023	884	−0.35%
Source: INSEE

== See also ==
- Communes of the Aveyron department
