= Camjac =

Commune in Occitanie, France

- Commune
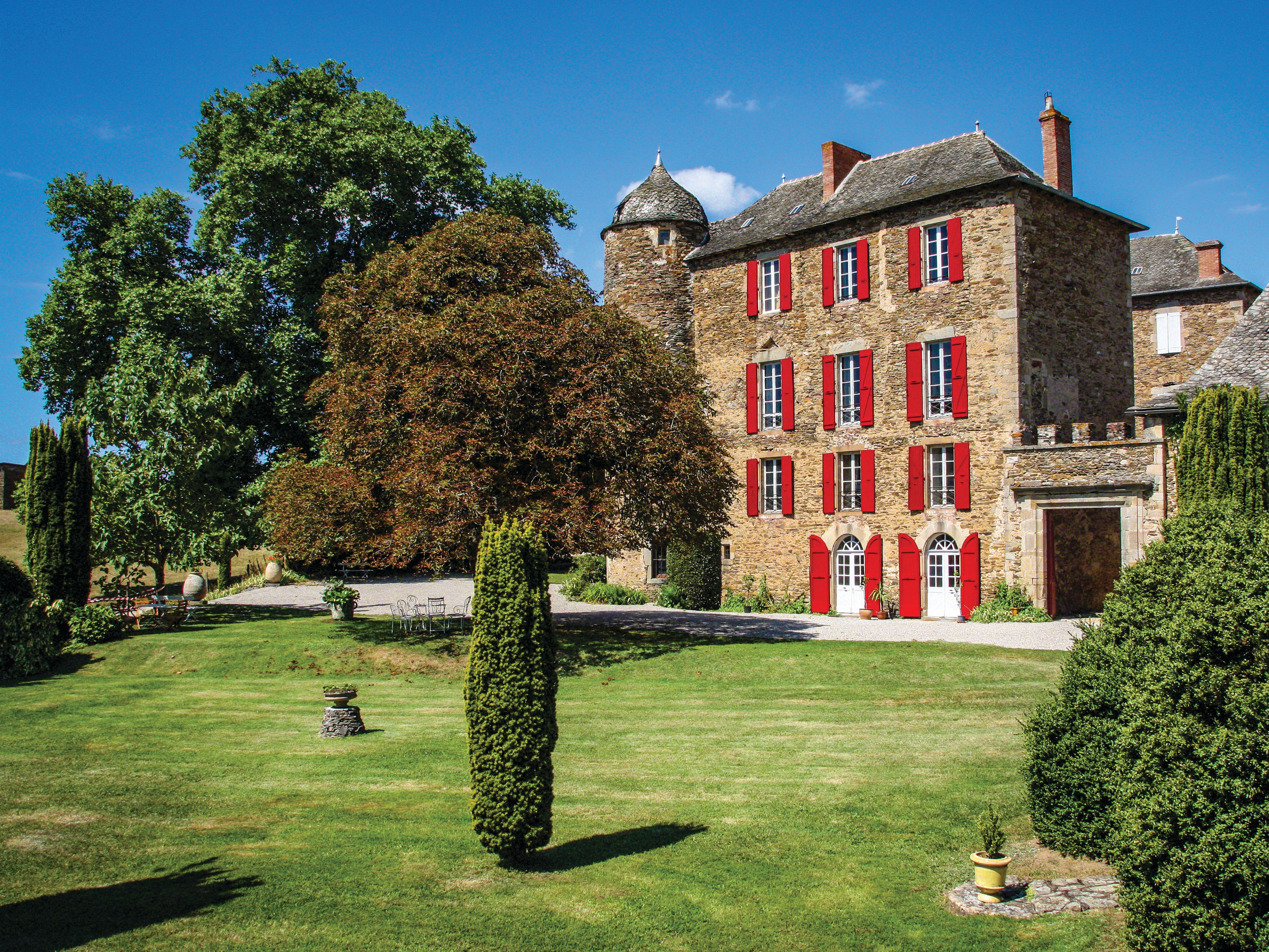
- The Chateau du Bosc

- Coat of arms
- Location of Camjac
- Location within France Location within Occitanie
- Coordinates: 44°10′56″N 2°22′47″E
- Country: France
- Region: Occitania
- Department: Aveyron
- Arrondissement: Villefranche-de-Rouergue
- Canton: Ceor-Ségala

Government
  - Mayor (2020–2026): Gabriel Espie
- Area^{1}: 23.03 km^{2} (8.89 sq mi)
- Elevation: 550 m (1,800 ft)
- Highest elevation: 613 m (2,011 ft)
- Lowest elevation: 319 m (1,047 ft)
- Population (2023): 576
  - Density: 25.0/km^{2} (64.8/sq mi)
- Time zone: UTC+01:00 (CET)
  - Summer (DST): UTC+02:00 (CEST)
- INSEE/Postal code: 12046 /12800
- ^{1} French Land Register data, which excludes lakes, ponds, glaciers > 1 km^{2} (0.386 sq mi or 247 acres) and river estuaries.

Camjac (French pronunciation: [kɑ̃ʒak]) is a commune in the Aveyron department in southern France.

== Population ==
Historical population
Year	Pop.	±% p.a.
1968	713	—
1975	649	−1.33%
1982	601	−1.09%
1990	596	−0.10%
1999	554	−0.81%
2007	530	−0.55%
2012	561	+1.14%
2017	572	+0.39%
2023	576	+0.12%
Source: INSEE

== See also ==
- Communes of the Aveyron department
