= Gramond =

Commune in Occitanie, France

- Commune
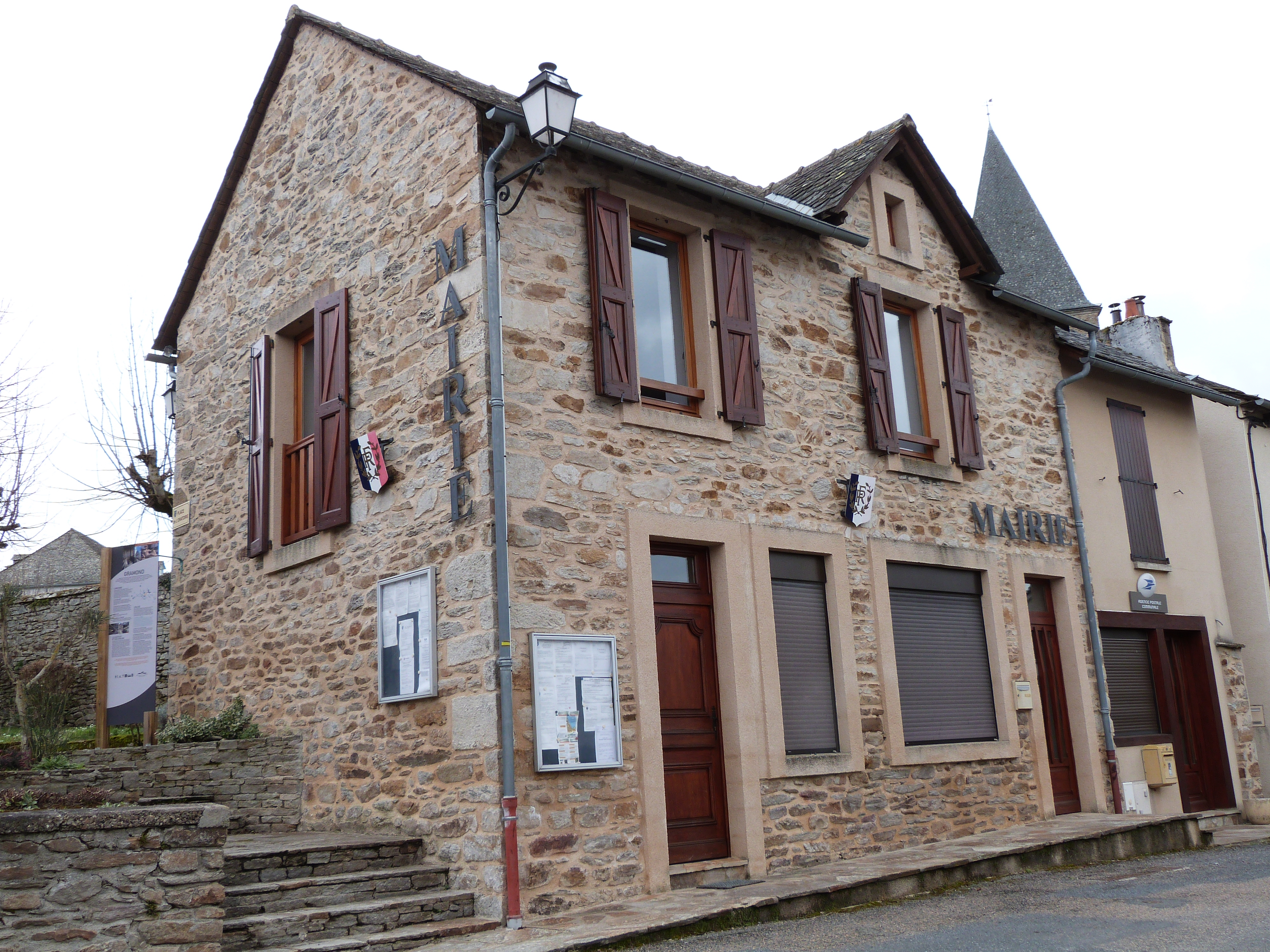
- Gramond Town hall

- Coat of arms
- Location of Gramond
- Location within France Location within Occitanie
- Coordinates: 44°15′57″N 2°21′58″E
- Country: France
- Region: Occitania
- Department: Aveyron
- Arrondissement: Villefranche-de-Rouergue
- Canton: Ceor-Ségala

Government
  - Mayor (2020–2026): André Bories
- Area^{1}: 13.14 km^{2} (5.07 sq mi)
- Elevation: 610 m (2,000 ft)
- Highest elevation: 728 m (2,388 ft)
- Lowest elevation: 457 m (1,499 ft)
- Population (2023): 551
  - Density: 41.9/km^{2} (109/sq mi)
- Time zone: UTC+01:00 (CET)
  - Summer (DST): UTC+02:00 (CEST)
- INSEE/Postal code: 12113 /12160
- ^{1} French Land Register data, which excludes lakes, ponds, glaciers > 1 km^{2} (0.386 sq mi or 247 acres) and river estuaries.

Gramond (French pronunciation: [ɡʁamɔ̃]; Occitan: Gramont) is a commune in the Aveyron department in southern France.

== Population ==
Historical population
Year	Pop.	±% p.a.
1968	526	—
1975	477	−1.39%
1982	417	−1.90%
1990	390	−0.83%
1999	367	−0.67%
2007	384	+0.57%
2012	460	+3.68%
2017	498	+1.60%
2023	551	+1.70%
Source: INSEE

== See also ==
- Communes of the Aveyron department
