= Boussac, Aveyron =

Commune in Occitanie, France

Boussac
- Commune
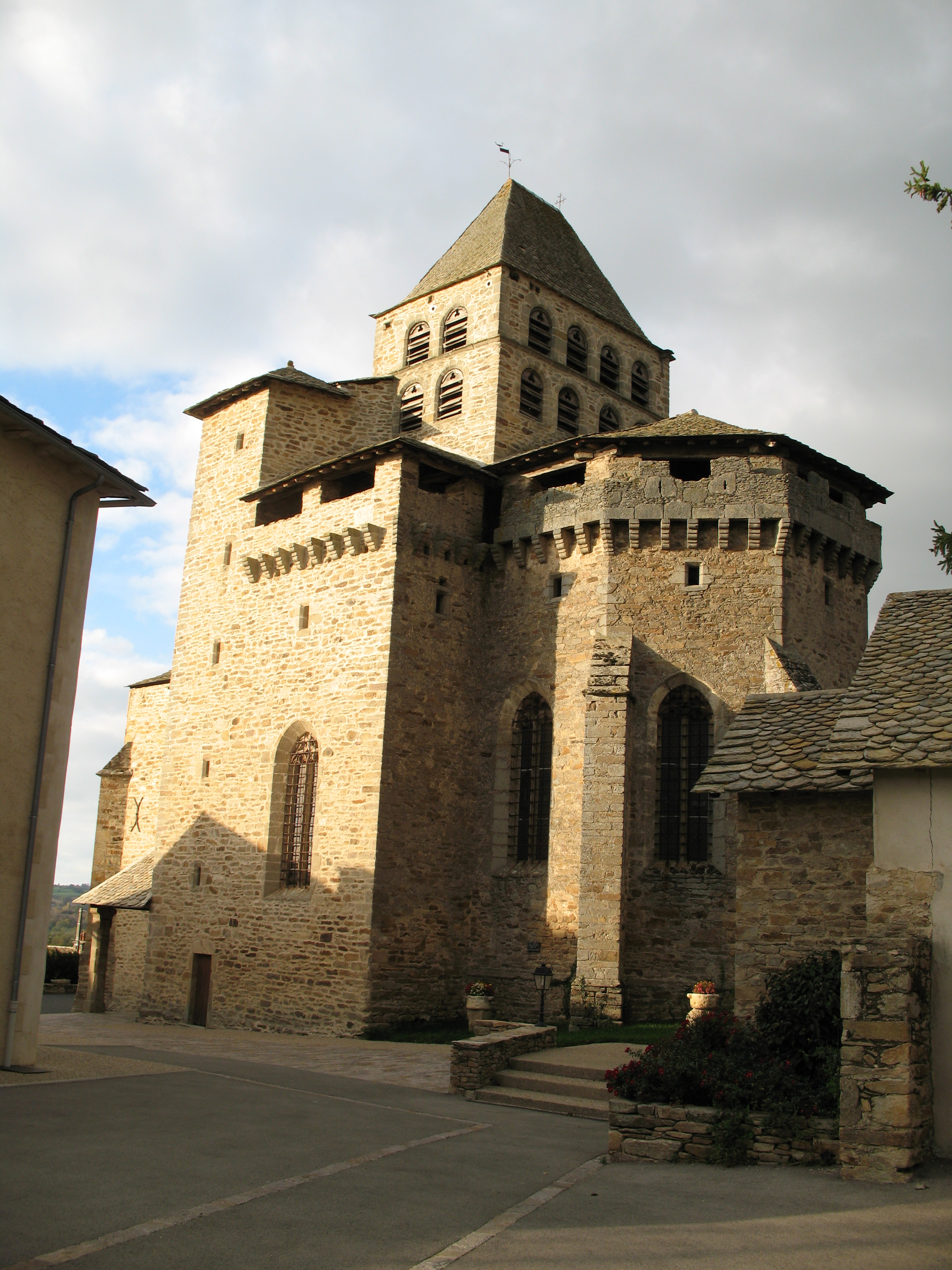
- The church in Boussac
- Location of Boussac
- Location within France Location within Occitanie
- Coordinates: 44°16′54″N 2°22′06″E
- Country: France
- Region: Occitania
- Department: Aveyron
- Arrondissement: Villefranche-de-Rouergue
- Canton: Ceor-Ségala

Government
  - Mayor (2020–2026): François Carrière
- Area^{1}: 17.92 km^{2} (6.92 sq mi)
- Elevation: 630 m (2,070 ft)
- Highest elevation: 758 m (2,487 ft)
- Lowest elevation: 518 m (1,699 ft)
- Population (2023): 611
  - Density: 34.1/km^{2} (88.3/sq mi)
- Time zone: UTC+01:00 (CET)
  - Summer (DST): UTC+02:00 (CEST)
- INSEE/Postal code: 12032 /12160
- ^{1} French Land Register data, which excludes lakes, ponds, glaciers > 1 km^{2} (0.386 sq mi or 247 acres) and river estuaries.

Boussac (French pronunciation: [busak]; Occitan: Bossac) is a commune in the Aveyron department in southern France.

== Population ==
Historical population
| Year | Pop. | ±% p.a. |
|---|---|---|
| 1968 | 633 | — |
| 1975 | 612 | −0.48% |
| 1982 | 558 | −1.31% |
| 1990 | 465 | −2.25% |
| 1999 | 415 | −1.26% |
| 2007 | 521 | +2.88% |
| 2012 | 534 | +0.49% |
| 2017 | 579 | +1.63% |
| 2023 | 611 | +0.90% |
Source: INSEE

== See also ==
- Communes of the Aveyron department
