= Cabanne Course =

Stream in the American state of Missouri

Coordinates: 37.9697736°N 90.5787381°W

Cabanne Course is a stream in St. Francois County in the U.S. state of Missouri.

Cabanne Course has the name of the local Cabanne family.
