= Camboulazet =

Commune in Occitanie, France

- Commune
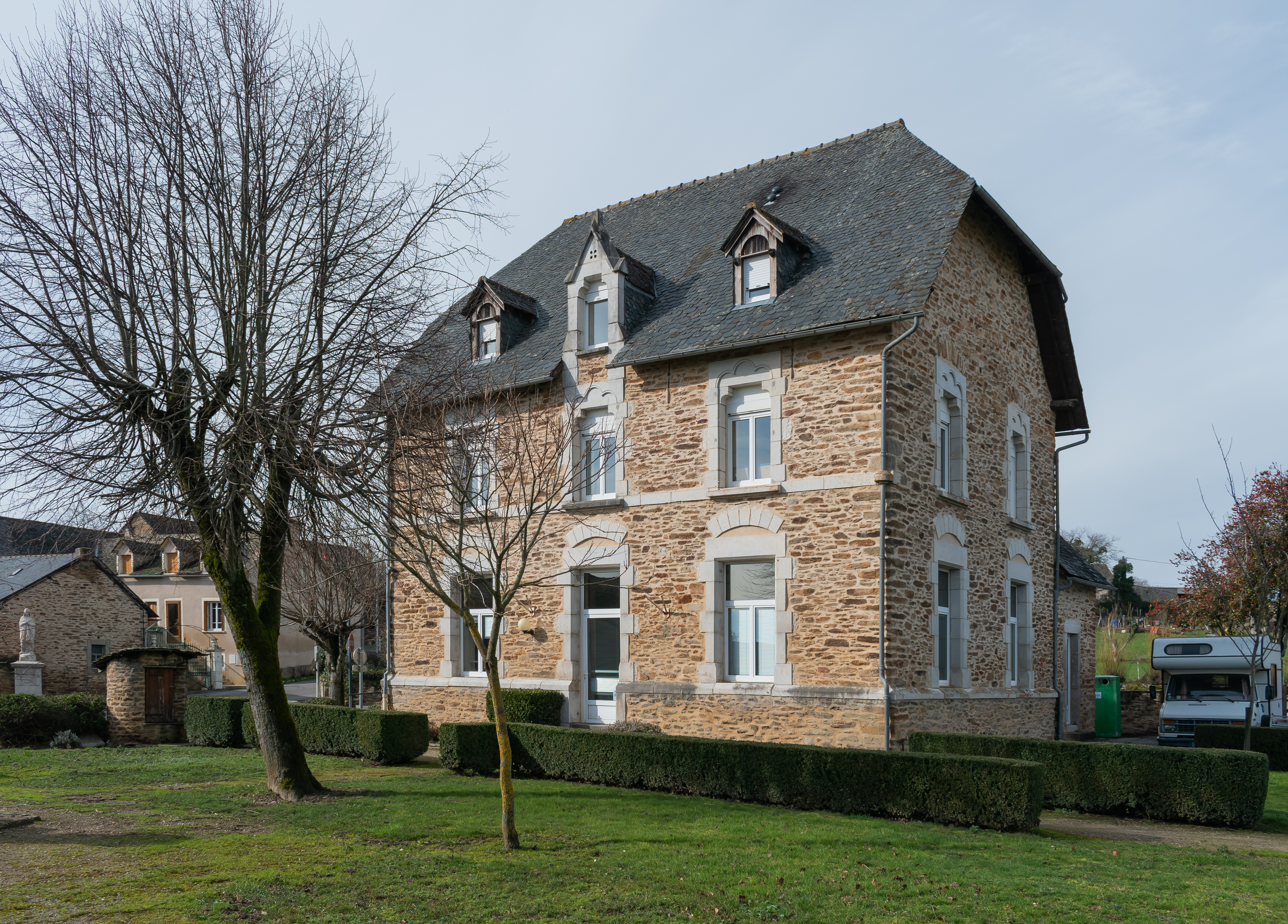
- Town hall of Camboulazet
- Location of Camboulazet
- Location within France Location within Occitanie
- Coordinates: 44°13′46″N 2°26′36″E
- Country: France
- Region: Occitania
- Department: Aveyron
- Arrondissement: Villefranche-de-Rouergue
- Canton: Ceor-Ségala

Government
  - Mayor (2020–2026): Jean Lachet
- Area^{1}: 13.78 km^{2} (5.32 sq mi)
- Elevation: 617 m (2,024 ft)
- Highest elevation: 746 m (2,448 ft)
- Lowest elevation: 379 m (1,243 ft)
- Population (2023): 412
  - Density: 29.9/km^{2} (77.4/sq mi)
- Time zone: UTC+01:00 (CET)
  - Summer (DST): UTC+02:00 (CEST)
- INSEE/Postal code: 12045 /12160
- ^{1} French Land Register data, which excludes lakes, ponds, glaciers > 1 km^{2} (0.386 sq mi or 247 acres) and river estuaries.

Camboulazet (French pronunciation: [kɑ̃bulazɛ]; Occitan: Cambolaset) is a commune in the Aveyron department in southern France.

== Population ==
Historical population
Year	Pop.	±% p.a.
1968	410	—
1975	357	−1.96%
1982	344	−0.53%
1990	312	−1.21%
1999	332	+0.69%
2007	366	+1.23%
2012	405	+2.05%
2017	398	−0.35%
2023	412	+0.58%
Source: INSEE

== See also ==
- Communes of the Aveyron department
