= Cabannes =

Cabannes may refer to:

== Communes in France ==
- Cabannes, Bouches-du-Rhône
- Les Cabannes, Ariège
- Les Cabannes, Tarn

== People ==
- Gaston Cabannes (1882–1950), French politician
- Jean Cabannes (1885–1959), French physicist
- Jean Cabannes (magistrate) (1925–2020), French jurist
- Laurent Cabannes (born 1964), French former rugby union footballer
- Romain Cabannes (born 1984), French rugby union player

== Other uses ==
- Cabannes (crater), a lunar crater

== See also ==
- Cabanes (disambiguation)
- Cabanès (disambiguation)
