= Quins, Aveyron =

Commune in Occitanie, France

Quins
- Commune
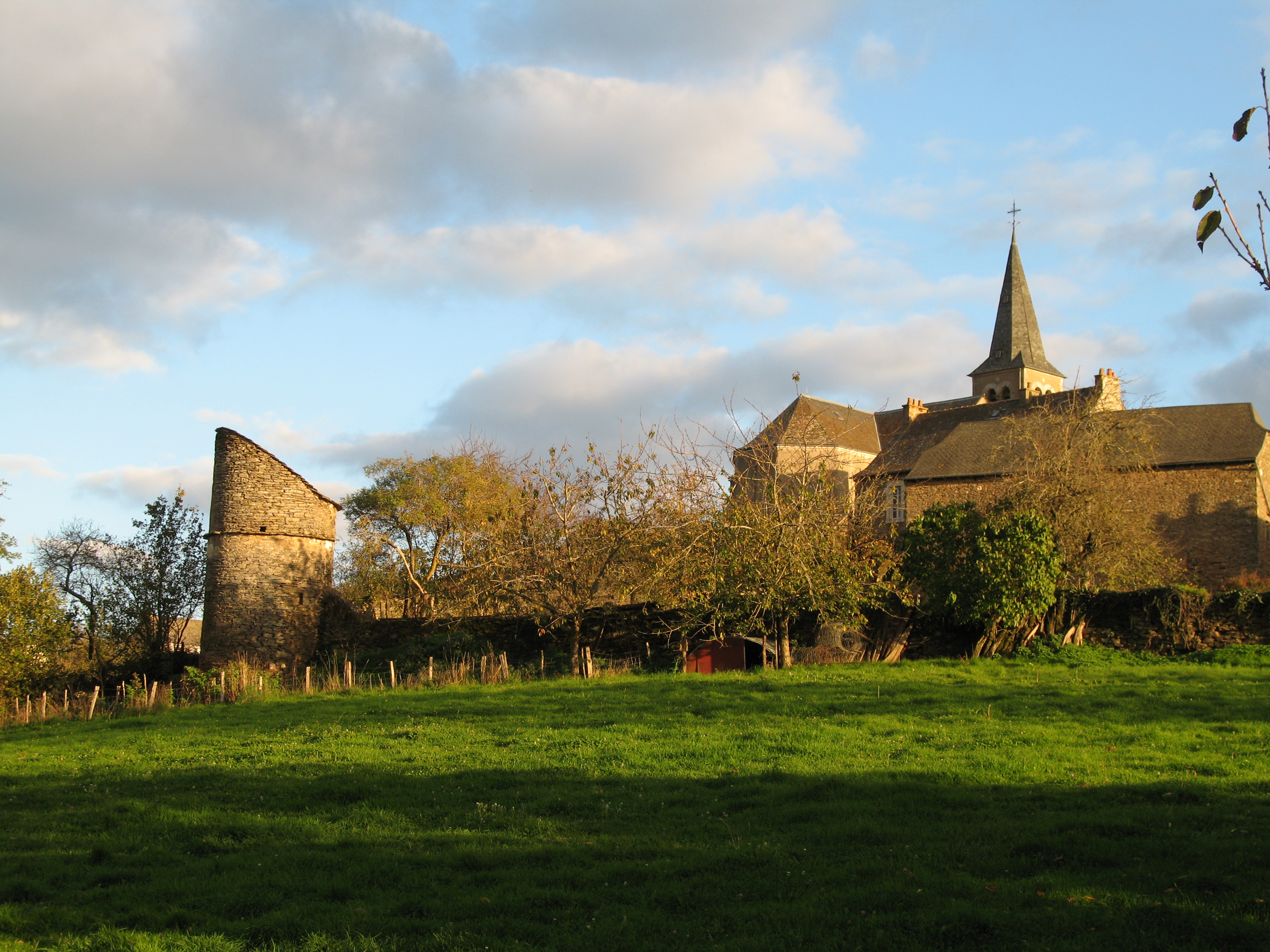
- A general view of Quins
- Location of Quins
- Location within France Location within Occitanie
- Coordinates: 44°14′00″N 2°22′25″E
- Country: France
- Region: Occitania
- Department: Aveyron
- Arrondissement: Villefranche-de-Rouergue
- Canton: Ceor-Ségala

Government
  - Mayor (2023–2026): Damien Rigal
- Area^{1}: 38.46 km^{2} (14.85 sq mi)
- Elevation: 608 m (1,995 ft)
- Highest elevation: 724 m (2,375 ft)
- Lowest elevation: 343 m (1,125 ft)
- Population (2023): 908
  - Density: 23.6/km^{2} (61.1/sq mi)
- Time zone: UTC+01:00 (CET)
  - Summer (DST): UTC+02:00 (CEST)
- INSEE/Postal code: 12194 /12800
- ^{1} French Land Register data, which excludes lakes, ponds, glaciers > 1 km^{2} (0.386 sq mi or 247 acres) and river estuaries.

Quins (French pronunciation: [kɛ̃s]) is a commune in the Aveyron department in southern France.

== Geography ==
=== Location ===
Quins borders Route Nationale 88, which crosses the commune at La Mothe. It lies between Naucelle and Baraqueville, in the Ségala region.

=== Villages and hamlets ===
Verdun, Jalenques, Salan, La Mothe Démies, Courtalesque, La Tournarie, Pradials, La Couliche, Cadars, Truels

== Population ==
Historical population
Year	Pop.	±% p.a.
1968	1,053	—
1975	886	−2.44%
1982	715	−3.02%
1990	717	+0.03%
1999	644	−1.19%
2007	781	+2.44%
2012	830	+1.22%
2017	844	+0.34%
2023	908	+1.23%
Source: INSEE

== See also ==
- Communes of the Aveyron department
