= Cabanès, Tarn =

Cabanès
- Commune
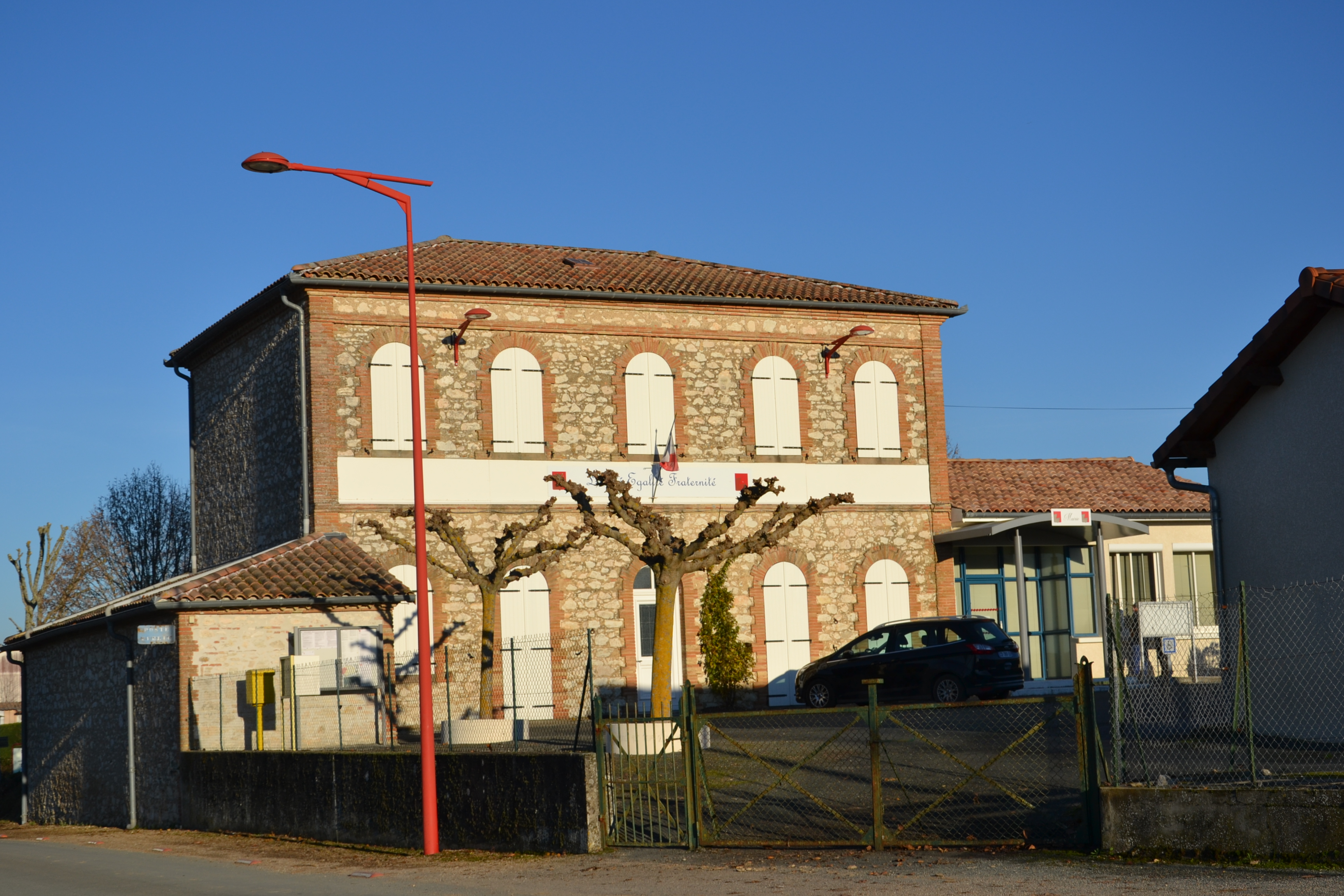
- Cabanès Town hall

- Coat of arms
- Location of Cabanès
- Location within France Location within Occitanie
- Coordinates: 43°43′50″N 1°56′32″E
- Country: France
- Region: Occitania
- Department: Tarn
- Arrondissement: Castres
- Canton: Plaine de l'Agoût
- Intercommunality: Lautrecois-Pays d'Agout

Government
  - Mayor (2020–2026): Denis Combet
- Area^{1}: 8.86 km^{2} (3.42 sq mi)
- Elevation: 220 m (720 ft)
- Highest elevation: 340 m (1,120 ft)
- Lowest elevation: 174 m (571 ft)
- Population (2023): 307
  - Density: 34.7/km^{2} (89.7/sq mi)
- Time zone: UTC+01:00 (CET)
  - Summer (DST): UTC+02:00 (CEST)
- INSEE/Postal code: 81044 /81500
- ^{1} French Land Register data, which excludes lakes, ponds, glaciers > 1 km^{2} (0.386 sq mi or 247 acres) and river estuaries.

Cabanès (French pronunciation: [kabanɛs]; Occitan: Cabanés) is a commune in the Tarn department and Occitanie region of southern France.

== Population ==
Historical population
Year	Pop.	±% p.a.
1968	175	—
1975	153	−1.90%
1982	161	+0.73%
1990	182	+1.54%
1999	155	−1.77%
2007	181	+1.96%
2012	259	+7.43%
2017	289	+2.22%
2023	307	+1.01%
Source: INSEE

== See also ==
- Communes of the Tarn department
