= Naucelle =

Commune in Occitanie, France

- Commune
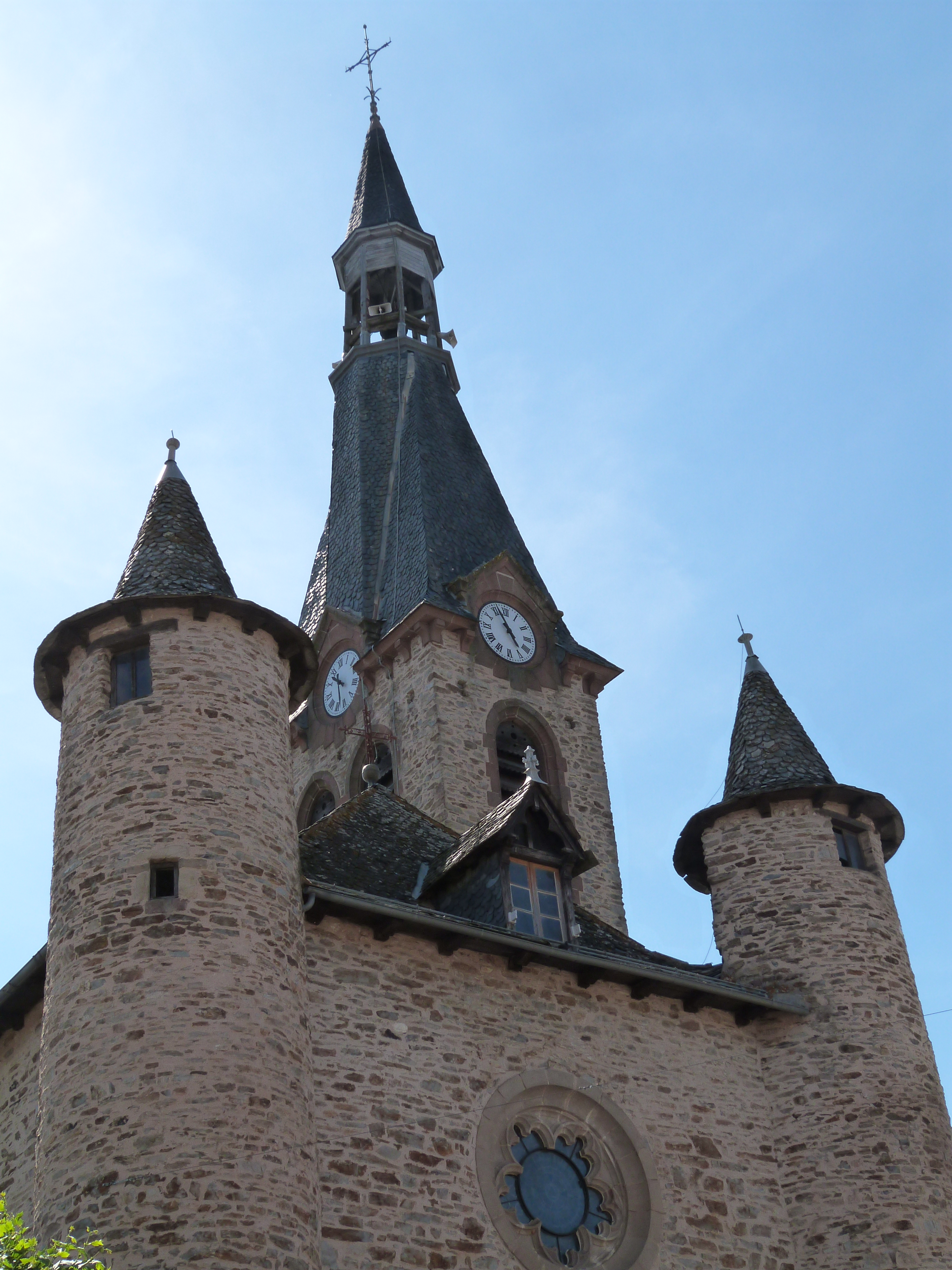
- The tower of the church in Naucelle

- Coat of arms
- Location of Naucelle
- Location within France Location within Occitanie
- Coordinates: 44°11′56″N 2°20′33″E
- Country: France
- Region: Occitania
- Department: Aveyron
- Arrondissement: Villefranche-de-Rouergue
- Canton: Ceor-Ségala

Government
  - Mayor (2020–2026): Karine Clément
- Area^{1}: 23.23 km^{2} (8.97 sq mi)
- Elevation: 415 m (1,362 ft)
- Highest elevation: 560 m (1,840 ft)
- Lowest elevation: 333 m (1,093 ft)
- Population (2023): 2,012
  - Density: 86.61/km^{2} (224.3/sq mi)
- Time zone: UTC+01:00 (CET)
  - Summer (DST): UTC+02:00 (CEST)
- INSEE/Postal code: 12169 /12800
- ^{1} French Land Register data, which excludes lakes, ponds, glaciers > 1 km^{2} (0.386 sq mi or 247 acres) and river estuaries.

Naucelle (French pronunciation: [nosɛl]; Occitan: Naucèla) is a commune in the Aveyron department in southern France. Naucelle station has rail connections to Toulouse, Albi and Rodez.

The commune is listed as a Village étape.

== Population ==
Historical population
| Year | Pop. | ±% p.a. |
|---|---|---|
| 1968 | 1,989 | — |
| 1975 | 2,157 | +1.17% |
| 1982 | 2,076 | −0.55% |
| 1990 | 1,929 | −0.91% |
| 1999 | 1,796 | −0.79% |
| 2007 | 1,960 | +1.10% |
| 2012 | 1,954 | −0.06% |
| 2017 | 2,004 | +0.51% |
| 2023 | 2,012 | +0.07% |
Source: INSEE

== Personalities ==
- Ozil de Cadartz, medieval troubadour
- Marcellin Cazals, Resistance fighter
- Jean Cuq, the general was from Naucelle.

== See also ==
- Communes of the Aveyron department
