= Anne-Marie Escoffier =

French politician (born 1942)

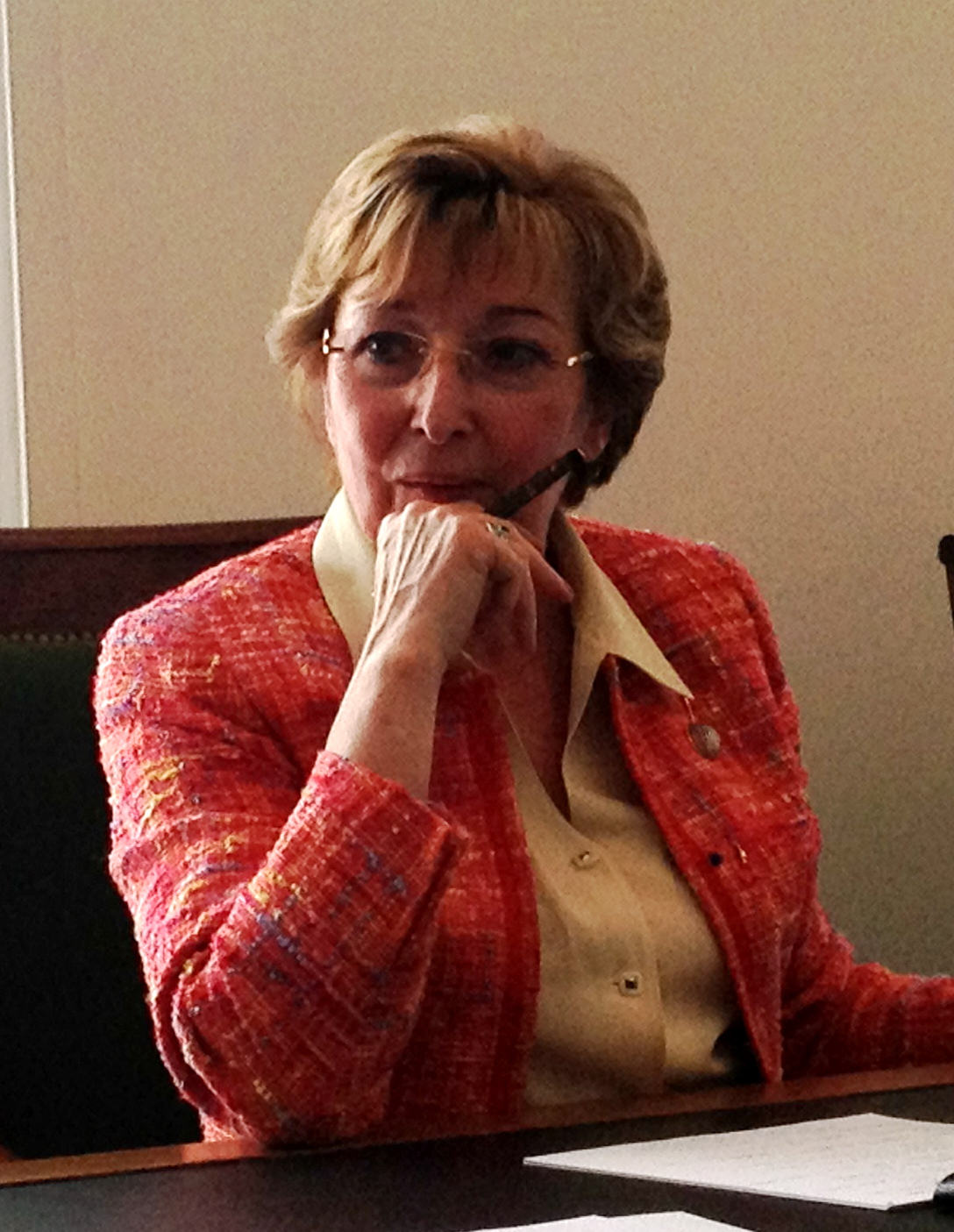
- Anne-Marie Escoffier in 2013

Minister Delegate to Decentralization
- In office 21 June 2012 – 31 March 2014
- President: François Hollande
- Prime Minister: Jean-Marc Ayrault
- Succeeded by: André Vallini

Member of the French Senate for Aveyron
- In office 2008–2014
- Preceded by: Jean Puech
- Succeeded by: Jean-Claude Luche

Personal details
- Born: 15 August 1942 (age 84) Dax, France
- Party: Radical Party of the Left
- Education: Jean Moulin University Lyon 3

Anne-Marie Escoffier (born 15 August 1942 in Dax, Landes) is a French politician and a former member of the Senate of France. She represented the Aveyron department as a member of the Radical Party of the Left.
