= Cabanès, Aveyron =

Commune in Occitanie, France

Cabanès
- Commune
- Location of Cabanès
- Location within France Location within Occitanie
- Coordinates: 44°11′09″N 2°18′24″E
- Country: France
- Region: Occitania
- Department: Aveyron
- Arrondissement: Villefranche-de-Rouergue
- Canton: Ceor-Ségala
- Intercommunality: Pays Ségali

Government
  - Mayor (2020–2026): Jacky Vialettes
- Area^{1}: 15.78 km^{2} (6.09 sq mi)
- Elevation: 500 m (1,600 ft)
- Highest elevation: 513 m (1,683 ft)
- Lowest elevation: 290 m (950 ft)
- Population (2023): 284
  - Density: 18.0/km^{2} (46.6/sq mi)
- Time zone: UTC+01:00 (CET)
  - Summer (DST): UTC+02:00 (CEST)
- INSEE/Postal code: 12041 /12800
- ^{1} French Land Register data, which excludes lakes, ponds, glaciers > 1 km^{2} (0.386 sq mi or 247 acres) and river estuaries.

Cabanès (French pronunciation: [kabanɛs]; Occitan: Cabanas) is a commune in the Aveyron department in southern France.

== Population ==
Historical population
Year	Pop.	±% p.a.
1968	349	—
1975	311	−1.63%
1982	291	−0.95%
1990	237	−2.53%
1999	220	−0.82%
2007	228	+0.45%
2012	229	+0.09%
2017	252	+1.93%
2023	284	+2.01%
Source: INSEE

== See also ==
- Communes of the Aveyron department
