= Montcabrier =

Montcabrier may refer to the following places in France:

- Montcabrier, Lot, a commune in the Lot department
- Montcabrier, Tarn, a commune in the Tarn department
