= Viviers-lès-Lavaur =

- Commune
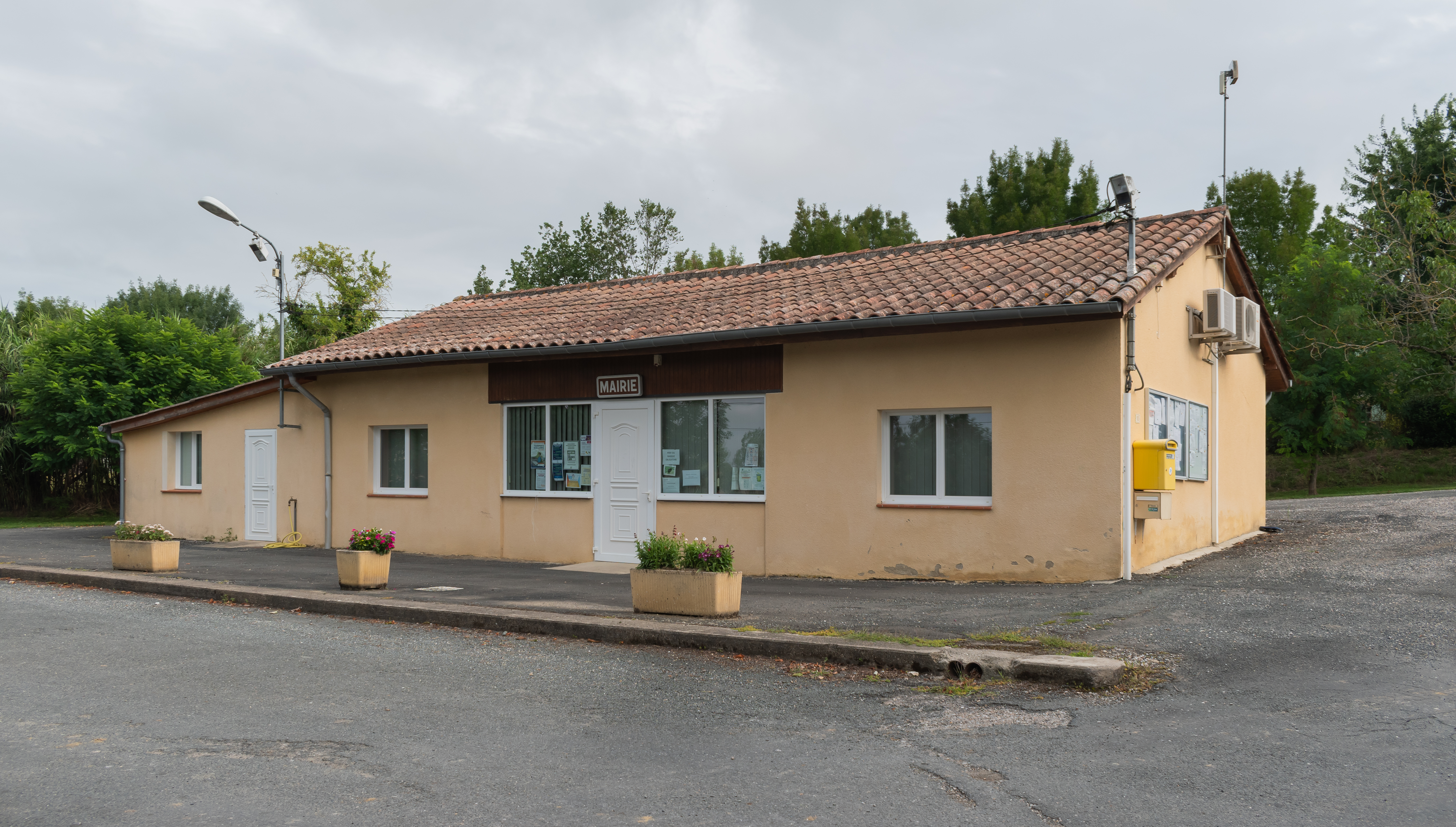
- Town hall of Viviers-lès-Lavaur

- Coat of arms
- Location of Viviers-lès-Lavaur
- Location within France Location within Occitanie
- Coordinates: 43°37′58″N 1°48′07″E
- Country: France
- Region: Occitania
- Department: Tarn
- Arrondissement: Castres
- Canton: Lavaur Cocagne
- Intercommunality: Tarn-Agout

Government
  - Mayor (2020–2026): Jean-Paul Rocache
- Area^{1}: 10.02 km^{2} (3.87 sq mi)
- Elevation: 260 m (850 ft)
- Highest elevation: 272 m (892 ft)
- Lowest elevation: 181 m (594 ft)
- Population (2023): 268
  - Density: 26.7/km^{2} (69.3/sq mi)
- Time zone: UTC+01:00 (CET)
  - Summer (DST): UTC+02:00 (CEST)
- INSEE/Postal code: 81324 /81500
- ^{1} French Land Register data, which excludes lakes, ponds, glaciers > 1 km^{2} (0.386 sq mi or 247 acres) and river estuaries.

Viviers-lès-Lavaur (French pronunciation: [vivje lɛ lavɔʁ], literally Viviers near Lavaur; Occitan: Vivièrs de la Vaur) is a commune in the Tarn department in southern France.

== See also ==
- Communes of the Tarn department
