= Cambon (disambiguation) =

Cambon can refer to

Places

- Cambon, a town and commune of the Tarn department of southern France.
- Cambon-et-Salvergues, a commune in the Hérault department in southern France.
- Cambon-lès-Lavaur is a village and commune in the Tarn département of France.

People

- Pierre-Joseph Cambon (1756–1820), a French statesman.
- Charles-Antoine Cambon (1802-1875), a French scenographer
- Paul Cambon (1843–1924), a French diplomat and brother to Jules Martin Cambon
- Jules Cambon (1845–1935), a French diplomat.
- Carlos García Cambón (1949–) is a former Argentine footballer currently working as a manager.
- Edgardo Cambón,(1960–) the lead singer and conga drummer of Candela a San Francisco-based nine piece salsa music and Latin jazz band
- Cédric Cambon (1986–), a French footballer who, as of 2007, is playing for Bulgarian side PFC Litex Lovech
