= Villeneuve-lès-Lavaur =

- Commune
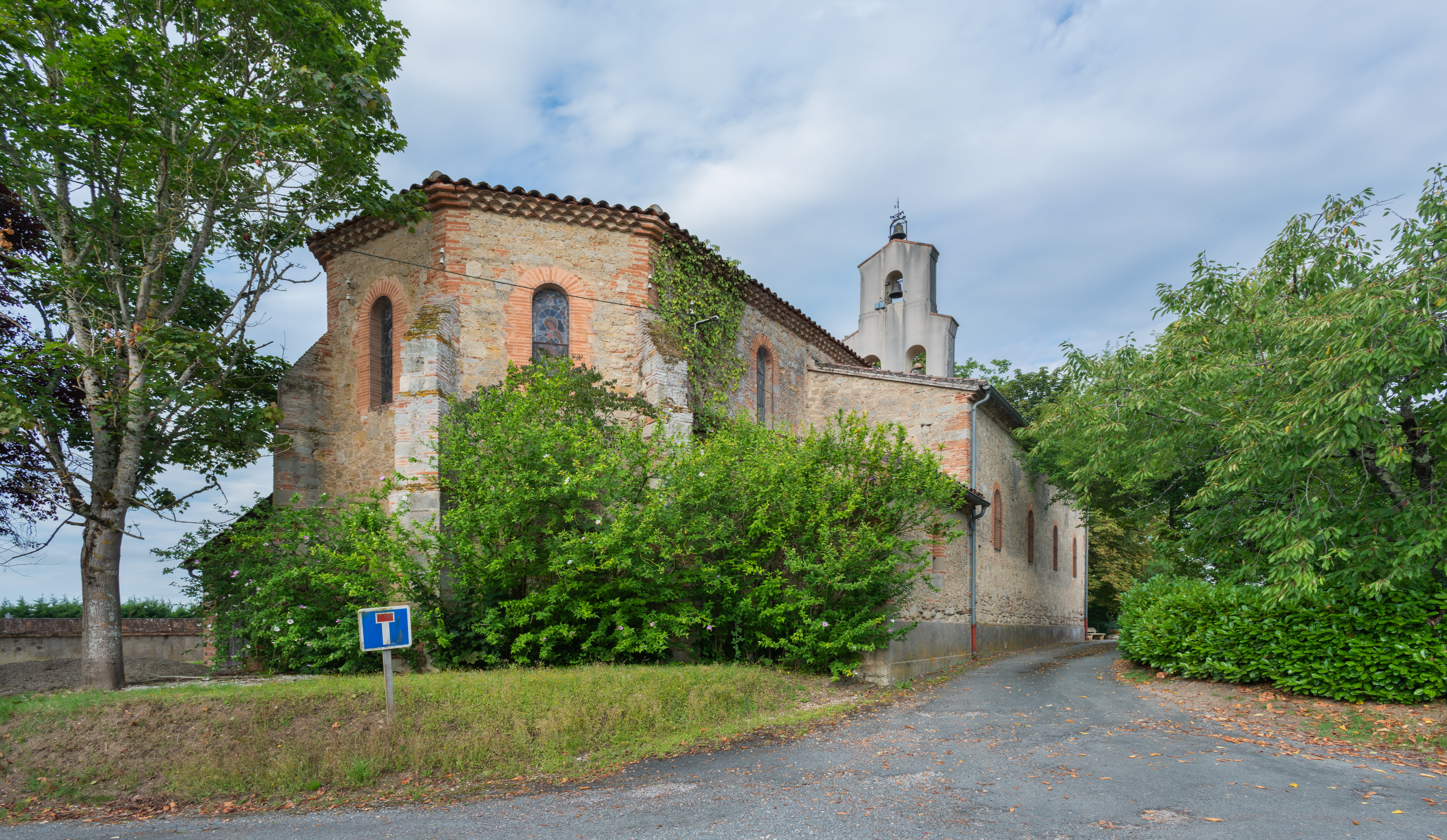
- Saint Saturnin church in Villeneuve-lès-Lavaur

- Coat of arms
- Location of Villeneuve-lès-Lavaur
- Location within France Location within Occitanie
- Coordinates: 43°36′00″N 1°47′15″E
- Country: France
- Region: Occitania
- Department: Tarn
- Arrondissement: Castres
- Canton: Lavaur Cocagne

Government
  - Mayor (2020–2026): Michel Bouyssou
- Area^{1}: 6.16 km^{2} (2.38 sq mi)
- Elevation: 200 m (660 ft)
- Highest elevation: 251 m (823 ft)
- Lowest elevation: 163 m (535 ft)
- Population (2023): 139
  - Density: 22.6/km^{2} (58.4/sq mi)
- Time zone: UTC+01:00 (CET)
  - Summer (DST): UTC+02:00 (CEST)
- INSEE/Postal code: 81318 /81500
- ^{1} French Land Register data, which excludes lakes, ponds, glaciers > 1 km^{2} (0.386 sq mi or 247 acres) and river estuaries.

Villeneuve-lès-Lavaur (French pronunciation: [vilnœv lɛ lavɔʁ], literally Villeneuve near Lavaur; Occitan: Vilanava de La Vaur) is a commune in the Tarn department in southern France.

== See also ==
- Communes of the Tarn department
