= Lugan =

Lugan may refer to:

== Places ==
- Lugano, a city in the canton of Ticino, Lugano
- Lugan, Aveyron, a commune in the Aveyron Department, France
- Lugan, Tarn, a commune in the Tarn Department, France
- An alternate name of the Luhan (river), a river in Ukraine

== People ==
- Bernard Lugan

== Other ==
- Lugan, an ethnic slur for a Lithuanian
