= Bannières =

- Commune
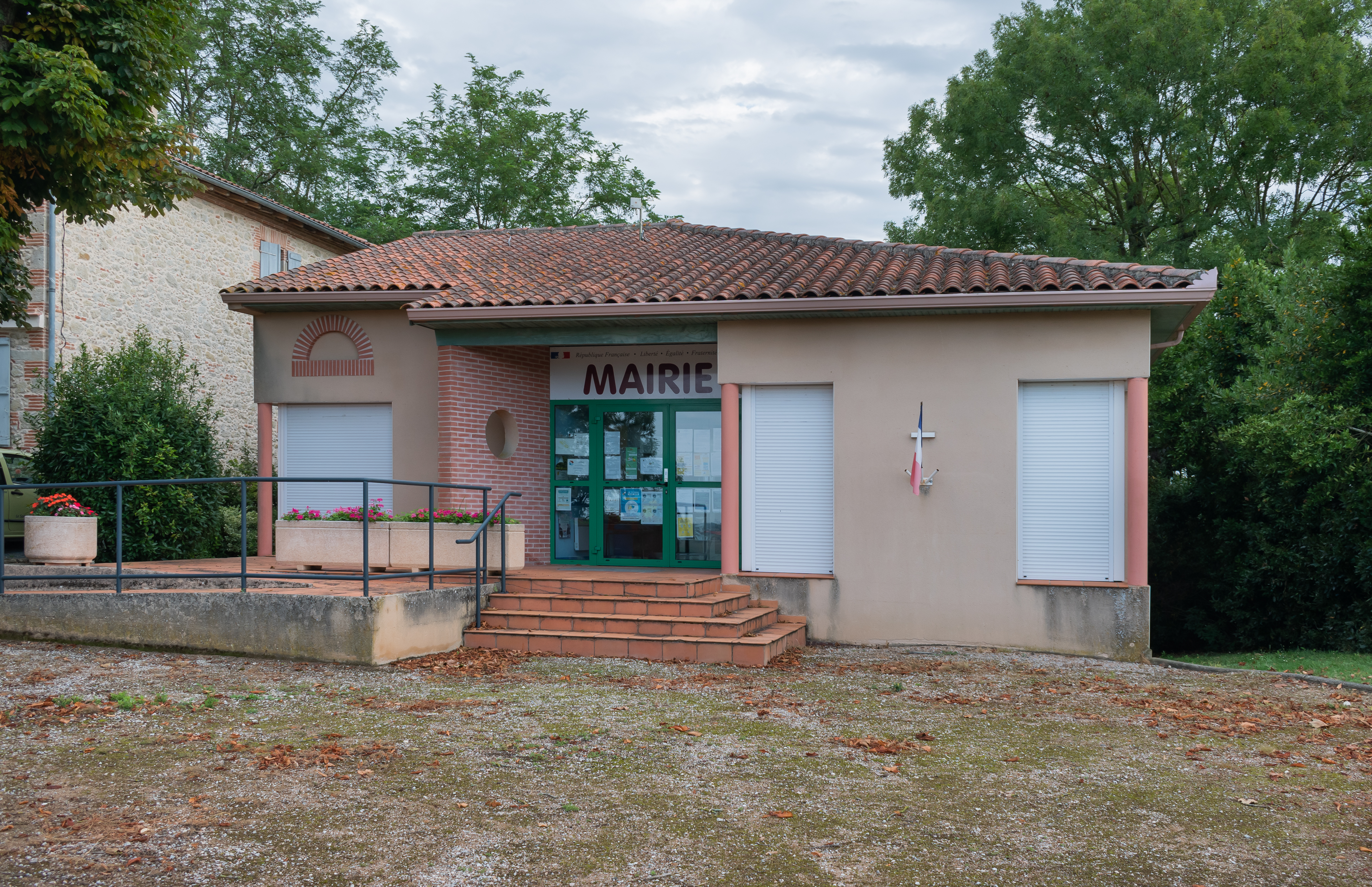
- Town hall of Bannières

- Coat of arms
- Location of Bannières
- Location within France Location within Occitanie
- Coordinates: 43°37′33″N 1°45′07″E
- Country: France
- Region: Occitania
- Department: Tarn
- Arrondissement: Castres
- Canton: Lavaur Cocagne
- Intercommunality: Tarn-Agout

Government
  - Mayor (2020–2026): Gérard Portes
- Area^{1}: 7.31 km^{2} (2.82 sq mi)
- Elevation: 250 m (820 ft)
- Highest elevation: 255 m (837 ft)
- Lowest elevation: 161 m (528 ft)
- Population (2023): 210
  - Density: 29/km^{2} (74/sq mi)
- Time zone: UTC+01:00 (CET)
  - Summer (DST): UTC+02:00 (CEST)
- INSEE/Postal code: 81022 /81500
- ^{1} French Land Register data, which excludes lakes, ponds, glaciers > 1 km^{2} (0.386 sq mi or 247 acres) and river estuaries.

Bannières (French pronunciation: [banjɛʁ]; Occitan: Banhièras) is a commune in the Tarn department and Occitanie region of southern France.

== See also ==
- Communes of the Tarn department
