= Algans =

- Commune
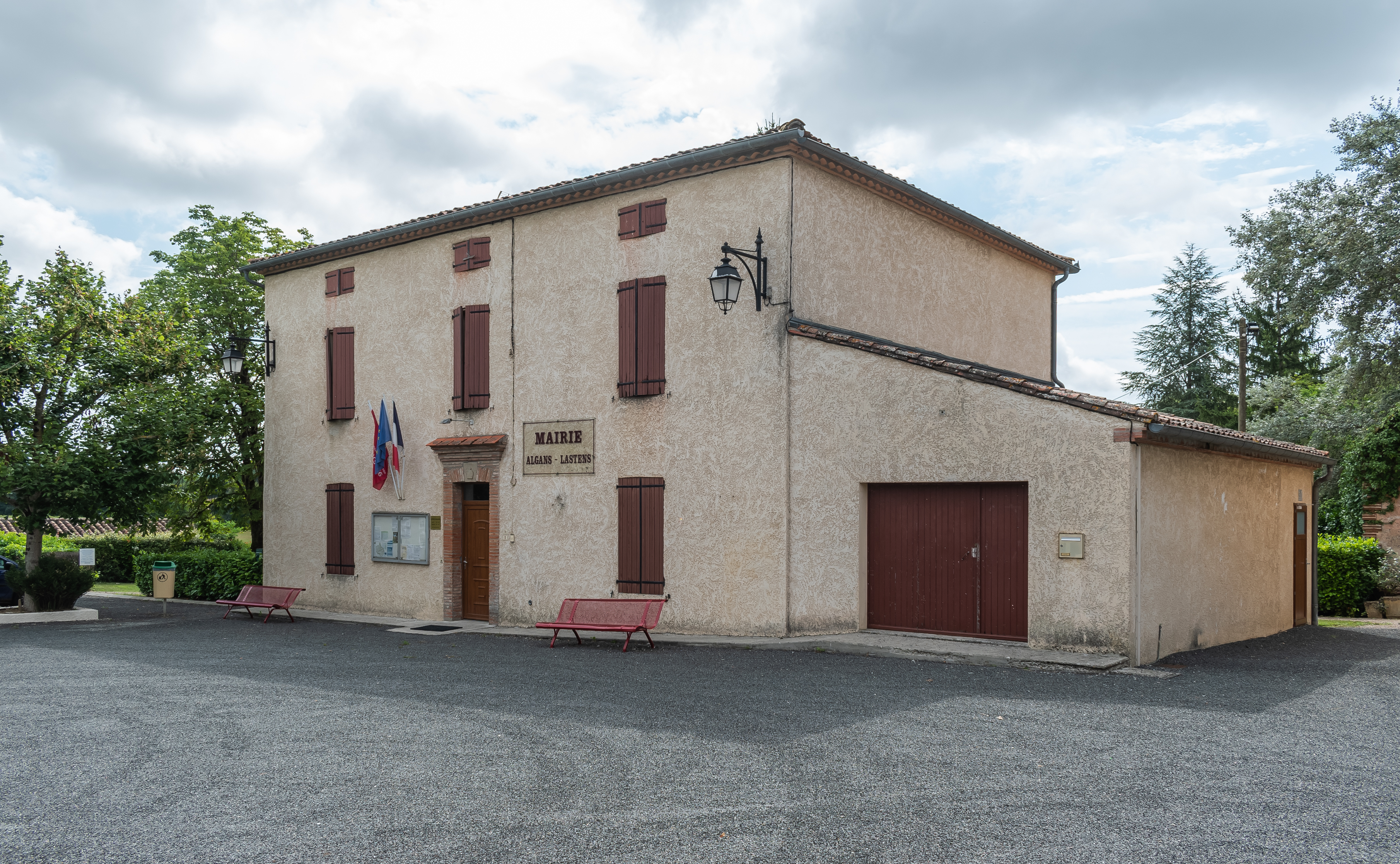
- Town hall of Algans

- Coat of arms
- Location of Algans
- Location within France Location within Occitanie
- Coordinates: 43°35′54″N 1°53′38″E
- Country: France
- Region: Occitania
- Department: Tarn
- Arrondissement: Castres
- Canton: Lavaur Cocagne
- Intercommunality: Sor et Agout

Government
  - Mayor (2020–2026): Roland Sabarthès
- Area^{1}: 14.43 km^{2} (5.57 sq mi)
- Elevation: 200 m (660 ft)
- Highest elevation: 312 m (1,024 ft)
- Lowest elevation: 191 m (627 ft)
- Population (2023): 223
  - Density: 15.5/km^{2} (40.0/sq mi)
- Time zone: UTC+01:00 (CET)
  - Summer (DST): UTC+02:00 (CEST)
- INSEE/Postal code: 81006 /81470
- ^{1} French Land Register data, which excludes lakes, ponds, glaciers > 1 km^{2} (0.386 sq mi or 247 acres) and river estuaries.

Algans is a commune of the Tarn department in southern France.

== Population ==
Historical population
Year	Pop.	±% p.a.
1968	217	—
1975	171	−3.35%
1982	161	−0.86%
1990	176	+1.12%
1999	200	+1.43%
2007	211	+0.67%
2012	211	+0.00%
2017	203	−0.77%
2023	223	+1.58%
Source: INSEE

== See also ==
- Communes of the Tarn department
