= Marzens =

- Commune
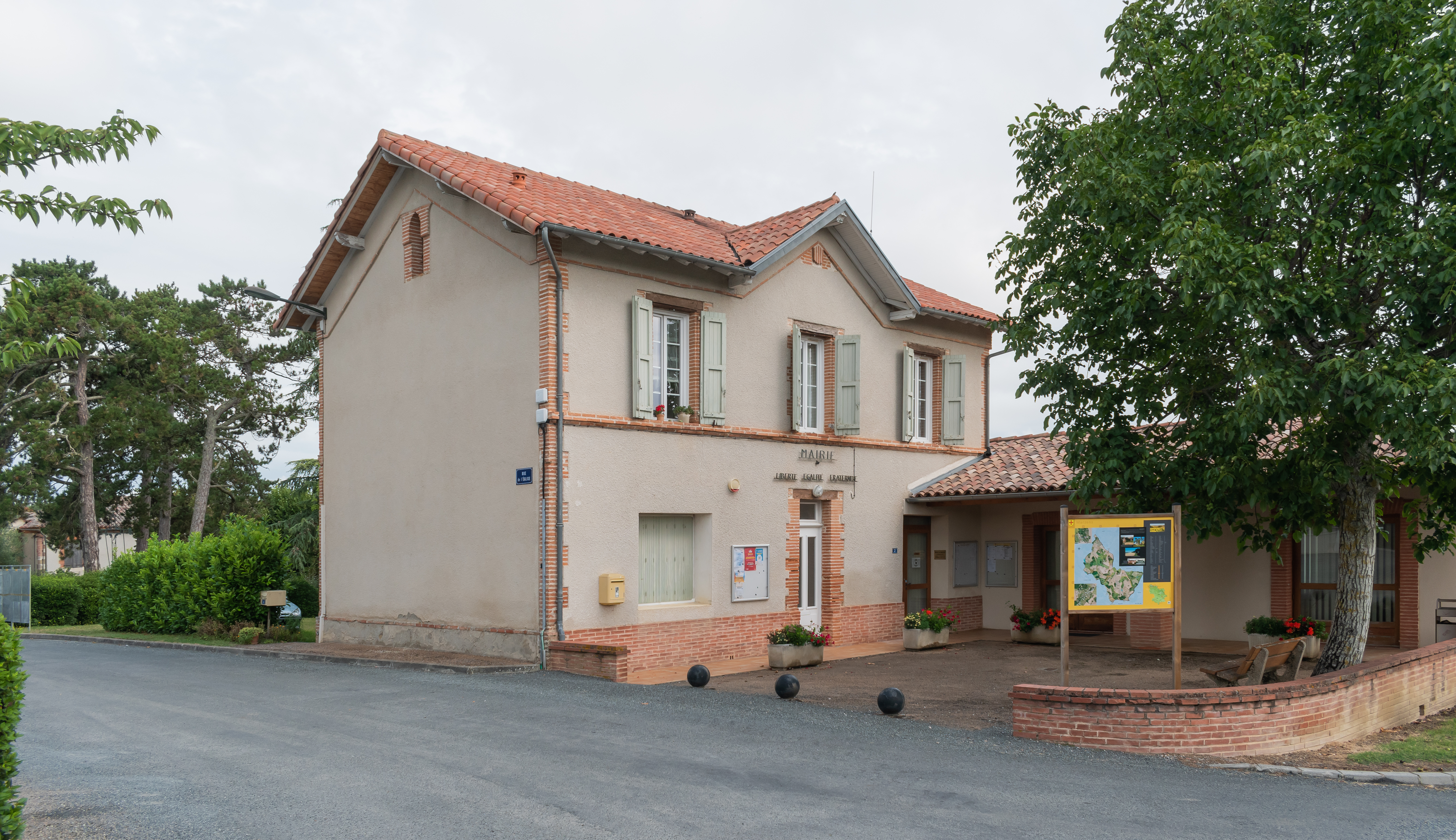
- Town hall of Marzens
- Location of Marzens
- Location within France Location within Occitanie
- Coordinates: 43°39′13″N 1°50′28″E
- Country: France
- Region: Occitania
- Department: Tarn
- Arrondissement: Castres
- Canton: Lavaur Cocagne

Government
  - Mayor (2020–2026): Didier Jeanjean
- Area^{1}: 11.26 km^{2} (4.35 sq mi)
- Elevation: 300 m (980 ft)
- Highest elevation: 301 m (988 ft)
- Lowest elevation: 139 m (456 ft)
- Population (2023): 311
  - Density: 27.6/km^{2} (71.5/sq mi)
- Time zone: UTC+01:00 (CET)
  - Summer (DST): UTC+02:00 (CEST)
- INSEE/Postal code: 81157 /81500
- ^{1} French Land Register data, which excludes lakes, ponds, glaciers > 1 km^{2} (0.386 sq mi or 247 acres) and river estuaries.

Marzens is a commune in the Tarn department in southern France.

== See also ==
- Communes of the Tarn department
