= Mouzens, Tarn =

Mouzens
- Commune
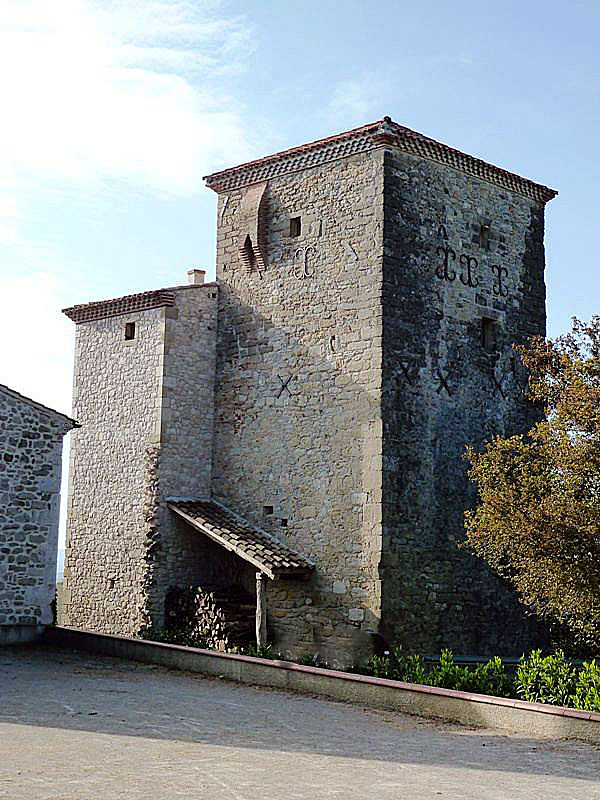

- Coat of arms
- Location of Mouzens
- Location within France Location within Occitanie
- Coordinates: 43°31′48″N 1°53′15″E
- Country: France
- Region: Occitania
- Department: Tarn
- Arrondissement: Castres
- Canton: Lavaur Cocagne

Government
  - Mayor (2020–2026): Christophe Bruno
- Area^{1}: 4.87 km^{2} (1.88 sq mi)
- Elevation: 290 m (950 ft)
- Highest elevation: 295 m (968 ft)
- Lowest elevation: 207 m (679 ft)
- Population (2023): 111
  - Density: 22.8/km^{2} (59.0/sq mi)
- Time zone: UTC+01:00 (CET)
  - Summer (DST): UTC+02:00 (CEST)
- INSEE/Postal code: 81189 /81470
- ^{1} French Land Register data, which excludes lakes, ponds, glaciers > 1 km^{2} (0.386 sq mi or 247 acres) and river estuaries.

Mouzens is a commune in the Tarn department and Occitanie region of southern France.

== See also ==
- Communes of the Tarn department
