= Veilhes =

- Commune
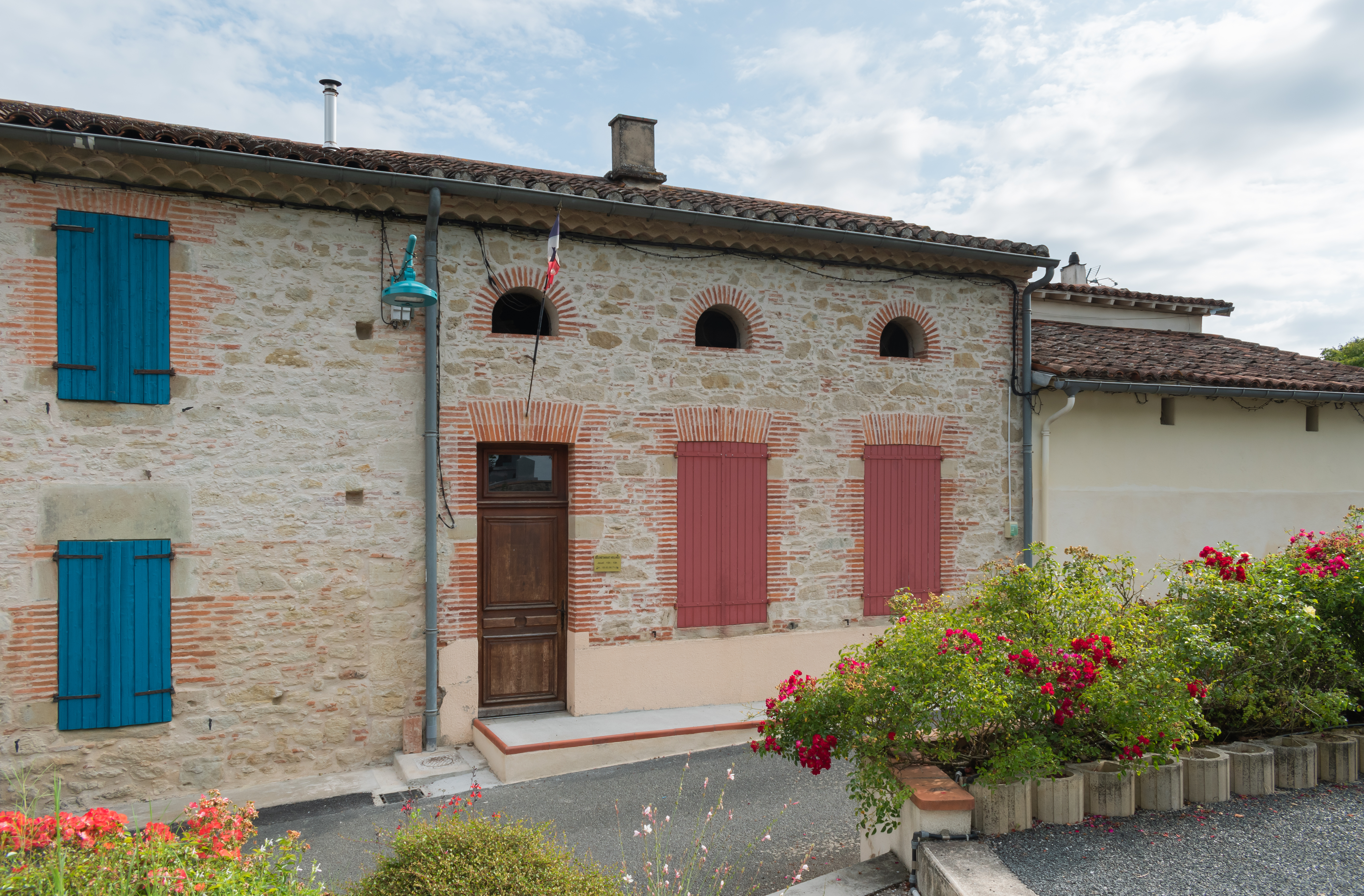
- Town hall of Veilhes

- Coat of arms
- Location of Veilhes
- Location within France Location within Occitanie
- Coordinates: 43°36′53″N 1°49′28″E
- Country: France
- Region: Occitania
- Department: Tarn
- Arrondissement: Castres
- Canton: Lavaur Cocagne

Government
  - Mayor (2020–2026): Benoît Catala
- Area^{1}: 5.59 km^{2} (2.16 sq mi)
- Highest elevation: 272 m (892 ft)
- Lowest elevation: 184 m (604 ft)
- Population (2023): 143
  - Density: 25.6/km^{2} (66.3/sq mi)
- Time zone: UTC+01:00 (CET)
  - Summer (DST): UTC+02:00 (CEST)
- INSEE/Postal code: 81310 /81500
- ^{1} French Land Register data, which excludes lakes, ponds, glaciers > 1 km^{2} (0.386 sq mi or 247 acres) and river estuaries.

Veilhes (French pronunciation: [vɛj]; Occitan: Velhas) is a commune in the Tarn department in southern France.

== See also ==
- Communes of the Tarn department
