= Maurens-Scopont =

- Commune
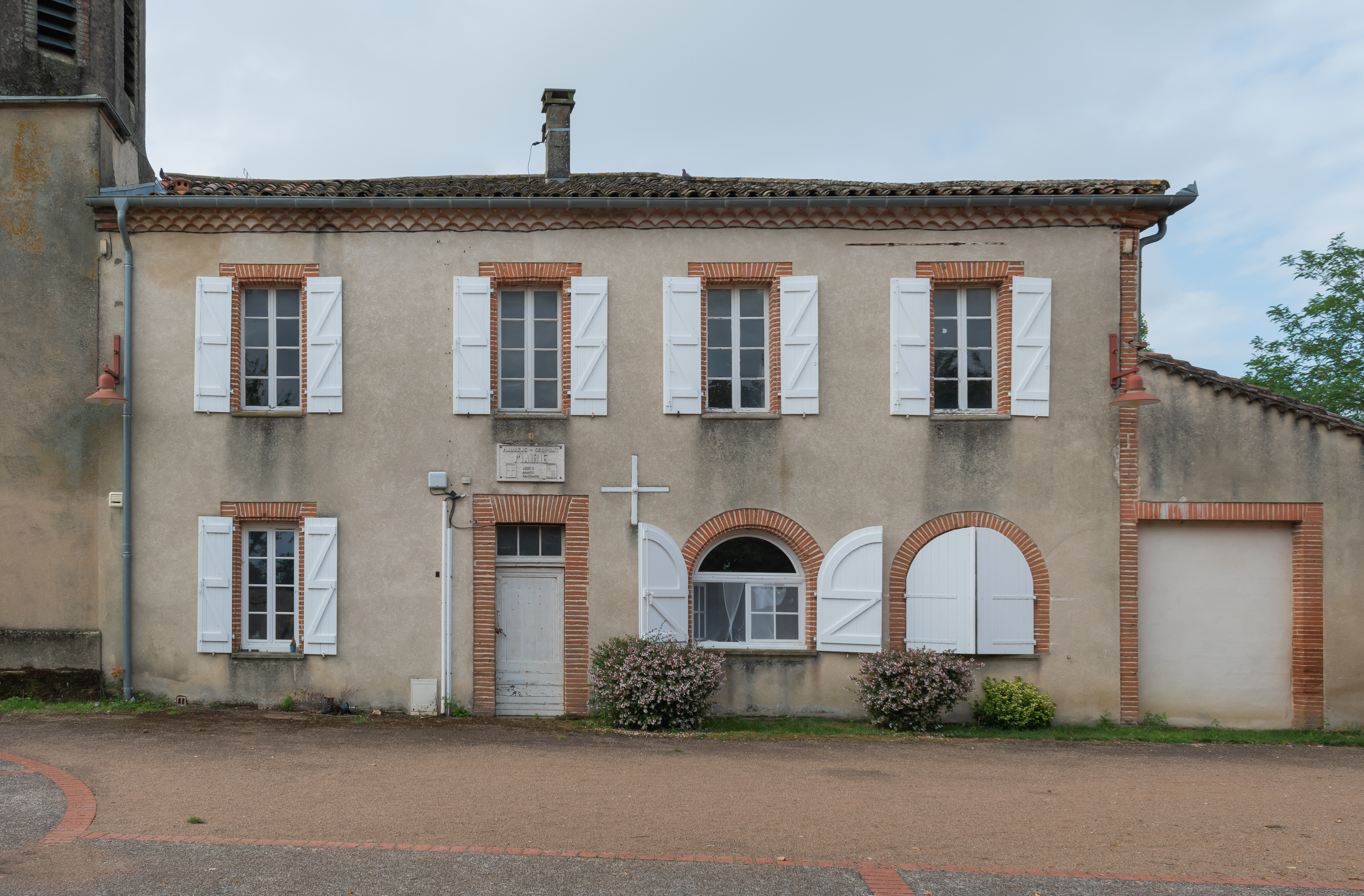
- Town hall of Maurens-Scopont

- Coat of arms
- Location of Maurens-Scopont
- Location within France Location within Occitanie
- Coordinates: 43°35′47″N 1°48′56″E
- Country: France
- Region: Occitania
- Department: Tarn
- Arrondissement: Castres
- Canton: Lavaur Cocagne

Government
  - Mayor (2020–2026): Claude Reilhes
- Area^{1}: 8.6 km^{2} (3.3 sq mi)
- Elevation: 247 m (810 ft)
- Highest elevation: 272 m (892 ft)
- Lowest elevation: 166 m (545 ft)
- Population (2023): 135
  - Density: 16/km^{2} (41/sq mi)
- Time zone: UTC+01:00 (CET)
  - Summer (DST): UTC+02:00 (CEST)
- INSEE/Postal code: 81162 /81470
- ^{1} French Land Register data, which excludes lakes, ponds, glaciers > 1 km^{2} (0.386 sq mi or 247 acres) and river estuaries.

Maurens-Scopont is a commune in the Tarn department in southern France.

== See also ==
- Communes of the Tarn department
