= Loupiac, Tarn =

Loupiac
- Commune
- Location of Loupiac
- Location within France Location within Occitanie
- Coordinates: 43°49′43″N 1°46′57″E
- Country: France
- Region: Occitania
- Department: Tarn
- Arrondissement: Albi
- Canton: Les Portes du Tarn
- Intercommunality: CA Gaillac-Graulhet

Government
  - Mayor (2024–2026): Laurent Estrada
- Area^{1}: 10.82 km^{2} (4.18 sq mi)
- Elevation: 121 m (397 ft)
- Highest elevation: 157 m (515 ft)
- Lowest elevation: 95 m (312 ft)
- Population (2023): 445
  - Density: 41.1/km^{2} (107/sq mi)
- Time zone: UTC+01:00 (CET)
  - Summer (DST): UTC+02:00 (CEST)
- INSEE/Postal code: 81149 /81800
- ^{1} French Land Register data, which excludes lakes, ponds, glaciers > 1 km^{2} (0.386 sq mi or 247 acres) and river estuaries.

Loupiac (French pronunciation: [lupjak]; Occitan: Lopiac) is a commune in the Tarn department in southern France.

== See also ==
- Communes of the Tarn department
