= Lavaur Cathedral =

Cathedral located in Tarn, in France

Coordinates: 43°41′57″N 1°49′18″E

Lavaur Cathedral Cathédrale Saint-Alain de Lavaur
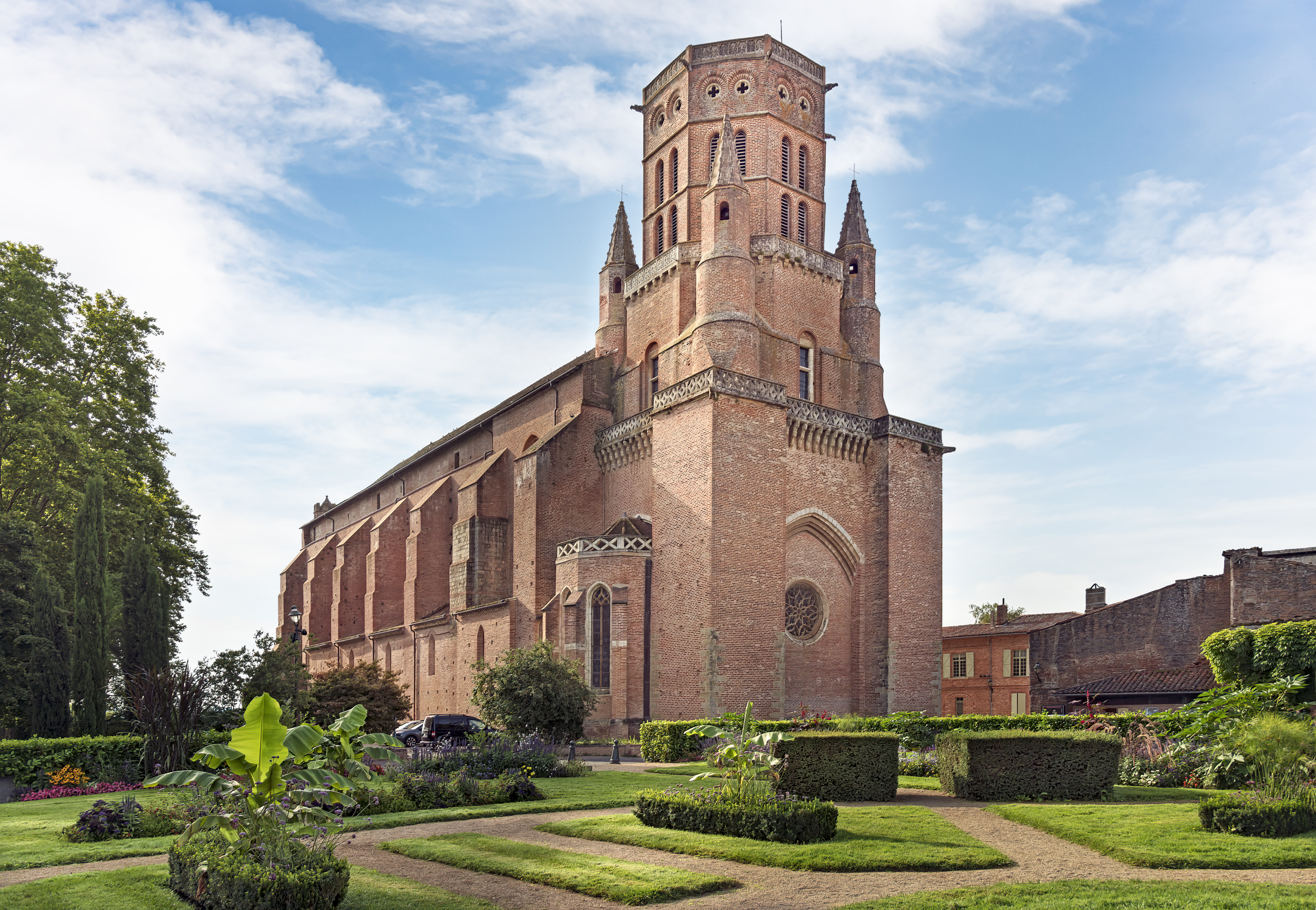
- Lavaur Cathedral

Religion
- Affiliation: Roman Catholic Church
- Province: Diocese of Lavaur
- Region: Tarn
- Rite: Roman Rite
- Ecclesiastical or organisational status: Cathedral
- Status: Active

Location
- Location: Lavaur, France
- Interactive map of Lavaur Cathedral; Cathédrale Saint-Alain de Lavaur

Architecture
- Type: church
- Style: Southern French Gothic
- Groundbreaking: 13th century
- Completed: 16th century

Lavaur Cathedral (French: Cathédrale Saint-Alain de Lavaur) is a Roman Catholic church and former cathedral located in the town of Lavaur, Tarn, France, and built from 1255 to 1300. The cathedral has been a national monument since 1911.

Inside, there is a Cavaillé-Coll organ from the XIX century. Each half-hour, a Jacquemart ring the bell on the top of a tower.

== Origines ==
The origine of Saint Alain of Lavaur honored in Lavaur still unknown, this is neither Alain de la Roche, nor the saint Alain one honored in Brittany.

The foundation of the priory of Saint Alain is attested by a charter from the 5 August 1098 when the bishop of Toulouse made a donation to the Benedictine monks of the abbey Saint-Pons-de-Thomières, provided for them to rebuild the Saint-Elan church of Lavaur, then in ruins, proving the cult of Saint Alain (Alan or Elan in Occitan) in Lavaur is clearly prior from this one date.

A roman Church was built from 1099 to 1211 by the Saint-Pons Benedictines, and destroyed in the crusade of the Albigeois during siege of the same year, 1211. The current church was built in the middle of the XIII° century, started around 1255, keeping the old roman tower of the Jacquemart. A pure Meridional Gothic style (H 23 m, L 13.60). This church from the XIII° century was only made of five bays closed by a wall. In 1317, the church become a Cathedral, starting a wave of construction at the initiation of the Bishops near the XVI° century.

Until the Concordat of 1801, this was the seat of the Diocese of Lavaur, now held by the Archbishop of Albi.

The cathedral is dedicated to Saint Alan of Lavaur. The present structure dates from the 13th, 14th and 15th centuries, and has an octagonal bell-tower. A second, smaller square tower contains a 16th-century jacquemart (a statue which strikes the hours with a hammer). In the bishop's garden is the statue of Emmanuel, comte de Las Cases, one of the companions of Napoleon on Saint Helena.

On 5 February 2019, teenagers vandalised parts of the cathedral, lighting a small fire and twisting the arm of a crucifix to make it appear that Christ was dabbing.
