= Teulat =

- Commune
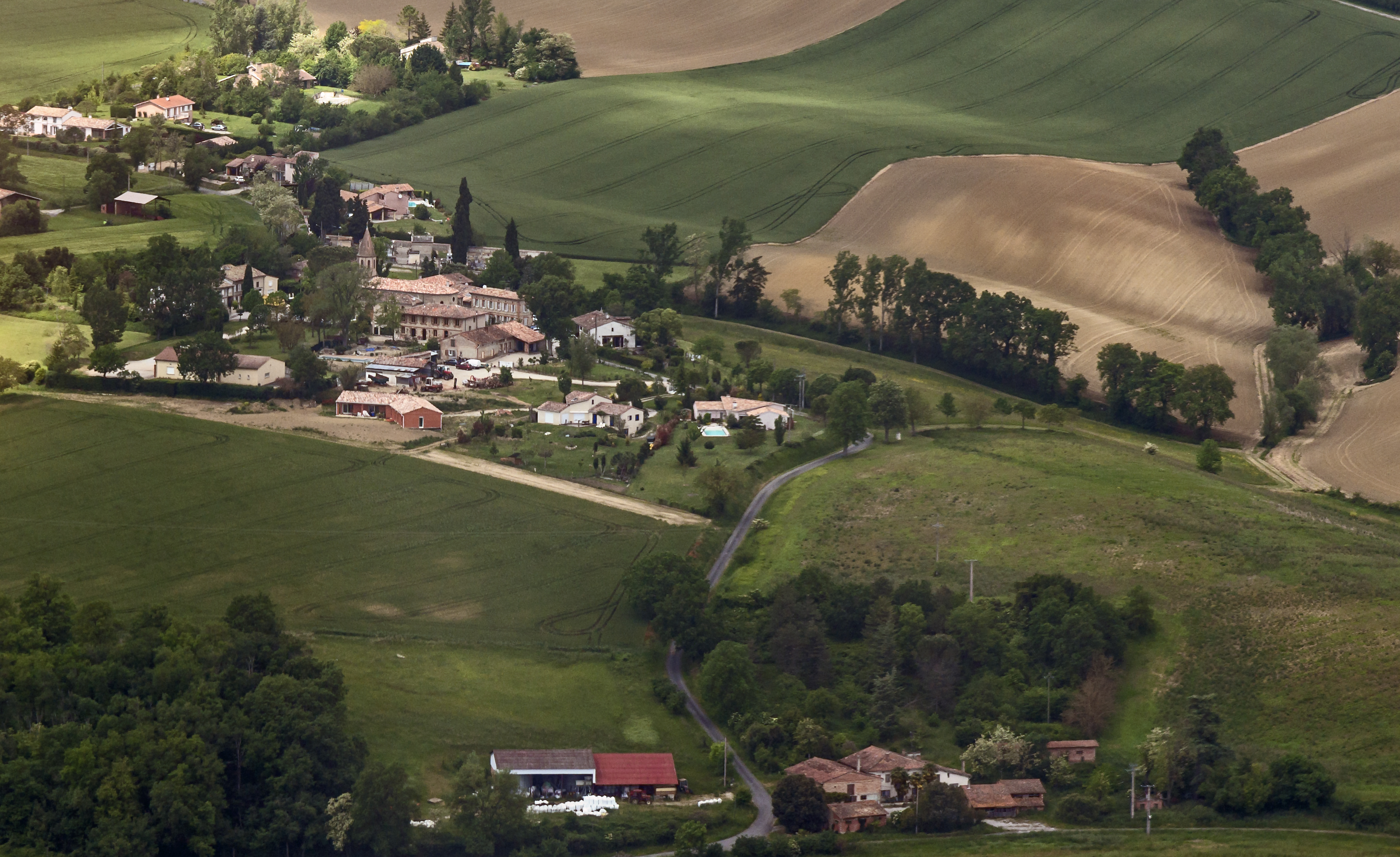

- Coat of arms
- Location of Teulat
- Location within France Location within Occitanie
- Coordinates: 43°38′11″N 1°41′58″E
- Country: France
- Region: Occitania
- Department: Tarn
- Arrondissement: Castres
- Canton: Lavaur Cocagne
- Intercommunality: CC Tarn-Agout

Government
  - Mayor (2020–2026): Sabine Mousson
- Area^{1}: 10.07 km^{2} (3.89 sq mi)
- Elevation: 180 m (590 ft)
- Highest elevation: 245 m (804 ft)
- Lowest elevation: 156 m (512 ft)
- Population (2023): 495
  - Density: 49.2/km^{2} (127/sq mi)
- Time zone: UTC+01:00 (CET)
  - Summer (DST): UTC+02:00 (CEST)
- INSEE/Postal code: 81298 /81500
- ^{1} French Land Register data, which excludes lakes, ponds, glaciers > 1 km^{2} (0.386 sq mi or 247 acres) and river estuaries.

Teulat (French pronunciation: [tøla]; Occitan: Taulat, meaning tiled roof) is a commune in the Tarn department in southern France.

== Monuments ==
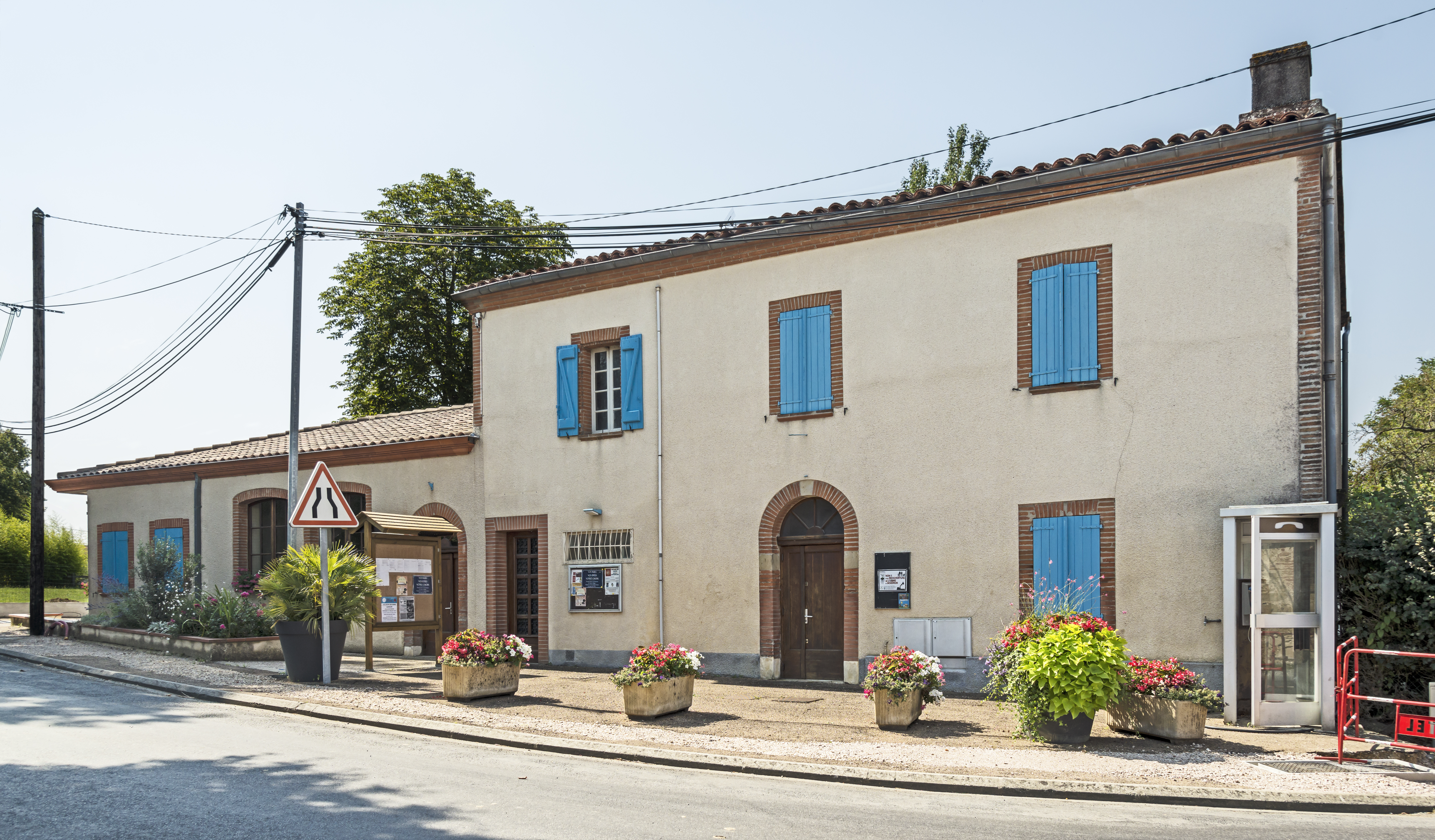
City hall

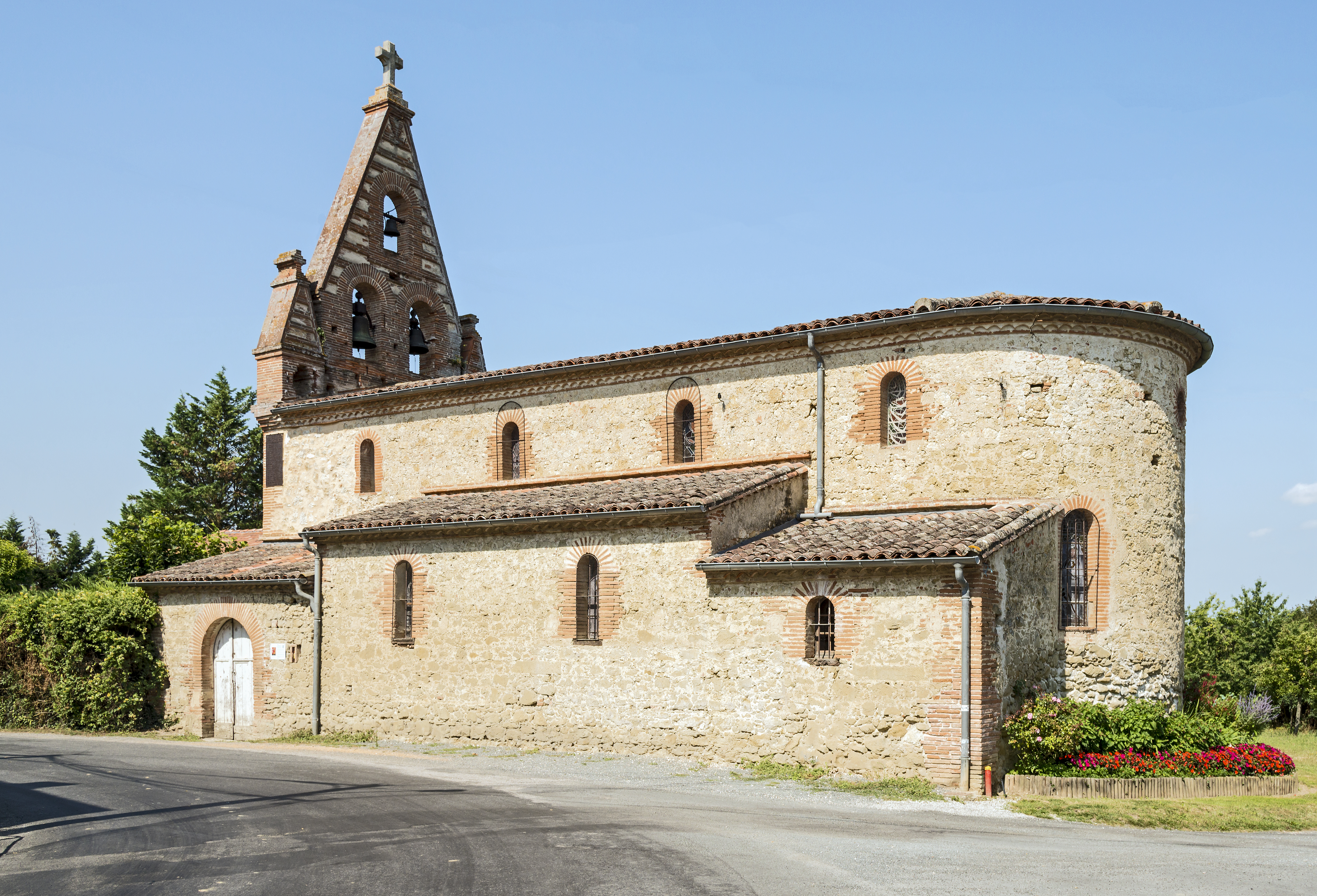
Chapel st.Marint

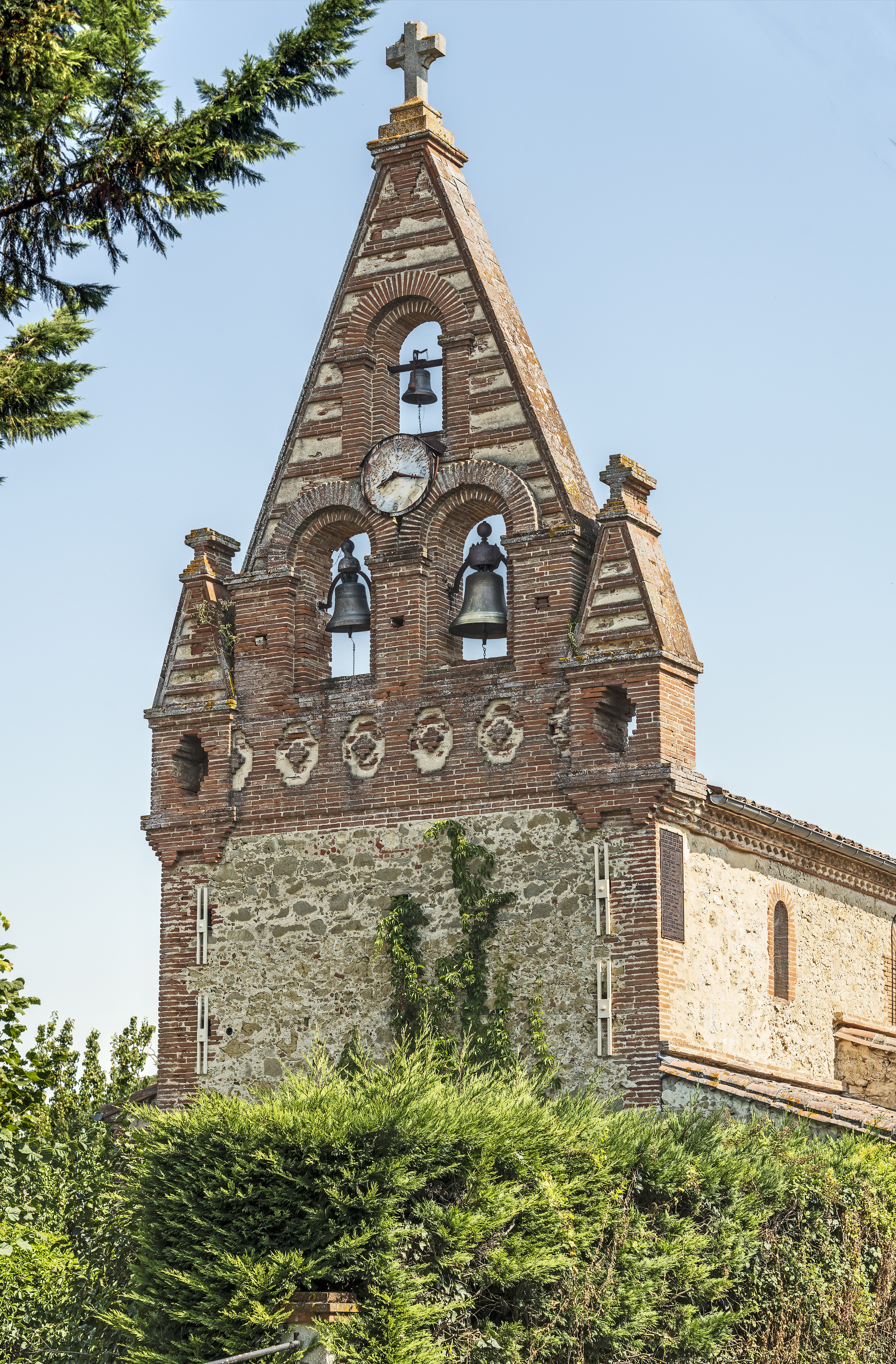
Bell gable

== See also ==
- Communes of the Tarn department
