= Cuq-Toulza =

- Commune
- Coat of arms
- Location of Cuq-Toulza
- Location within France Location within Occitanie
- Coordinates: 43°34′11″N 1°53′02″E
- Country: France
- Region: Occitania
- Department: Tarn
- Arrondissement: Castres
- Canton: Lavaur Cocagne
- Intercommunality: CC du Sor et de l'Agout

Government
  - Mayor (2020–2026): Jean-Claude Pinel
- Area^{1}: 23.05 km^{2} (8.90 sq mi)
- Elevation: 270 m (890 ft)
- Highest elevation: 296 m (971 ft)
- Lowest elevation: 182 m (597 ft)
- Population (2023): 702
  - Density: 30.5/km^{2} (78.9/sq mi)
- Time zone: UTC+01:00 (CET)
  - Summer (DST): UTC+02:00 (CEST)
- INSEE/Postal code: 81076 /81470
- ^{1} French Land Register data, which excludes lakes, ponds, glaciers > 1 km^{2} (0.386 sq mi or 247 acres) and river estuaries.

Cuq-Toulza (French pronunciation: [kyk tulza]; Occitan: Cuc Tolzan, meaning dark of Toulouse) is a commune in the Tarn department in southern France.

== See also ==
- Communes of the Tarn department
