= Saint-Agnan, Tarn =

Saint-Agnan
- Commune
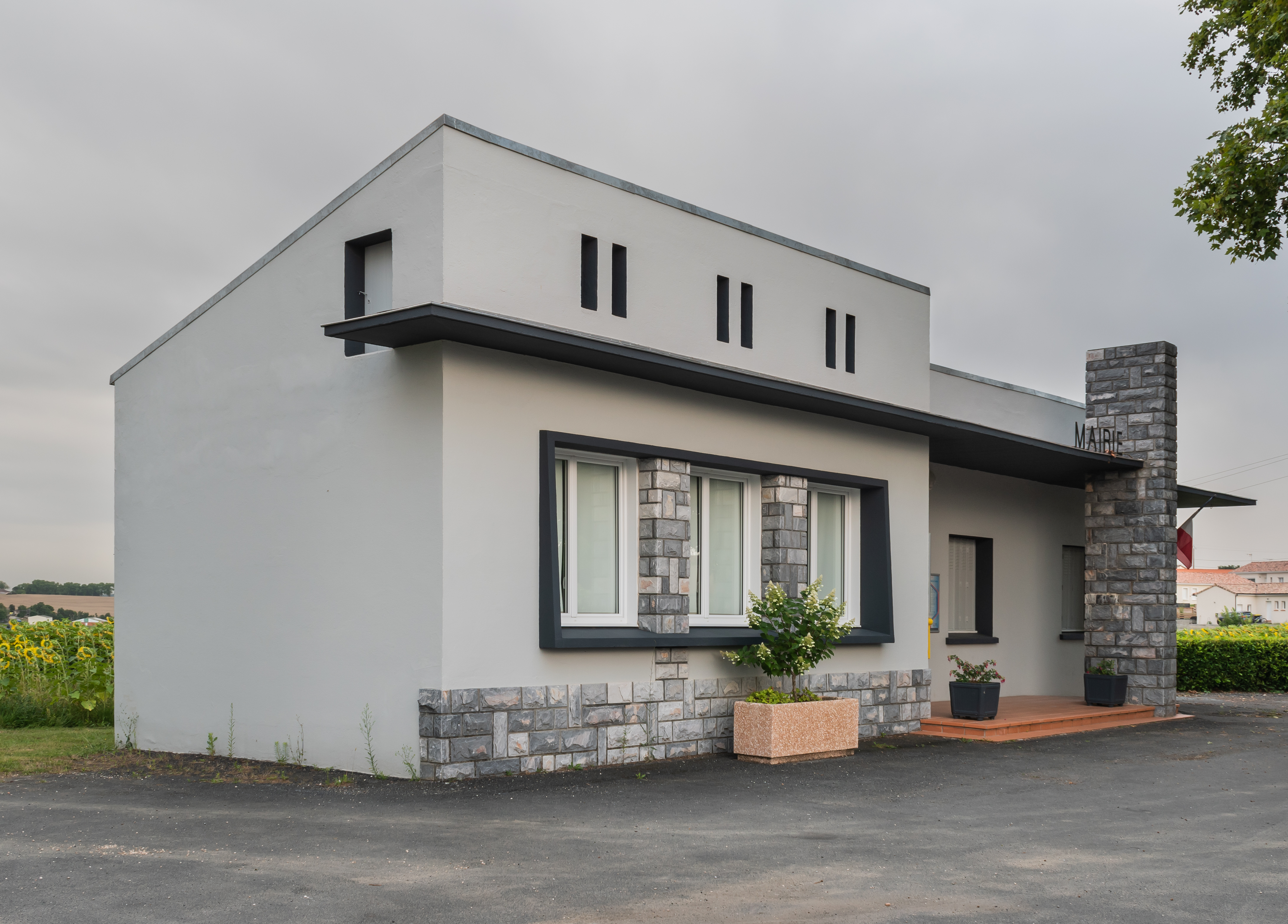
- Town hall of Saint-Agnan

- Coat of arms
- Location of Saint-Agnan
- Location within France Location within Occitanie
- Coordinates: 43°41′49″N 1°44′06″E
- Country: France
- Region: Occitania
- Department: Tarn
- Arrondissement: Castres
- Canton: Les Portes du Tarn
- Intercommunality: CC Tarn-Agout

Government
  - Mayor (2020–2026): Brigitte Aubert-Parayre
- Area^{1}: 6.88 km^{2} (2.66 sq mi)
- Elevation: 214 m (702 ft)
- Highest elevation: 243 m (797 ft)
- Lowest elevation: 155 m (509 ft)
- Population (2023): 304
  - Density: 44.2/km^{2} (114/sq mi)
- Time zone: UTC+01:00 (CET)
  - Summer (DST): UTC+02:00 (CEST)
- INSEE/Postal code: 81236 /81500
- ^{1} French Land Register data, which excludes lakes, ponds, glaciers > 1 km^{2} (0.386 sq mi or 247 acres) and river estuaries.

Saint-Agnan (French pronunciation: [sɛ̃.t‿aɲɑ̃]; Languedocien: Sanch Inhan) is a commune in the Tarn department in southern France.

== See also ==
- Communes of the Tarn department
