= Canton of Lavaur Cocagne =

Coordinates: 43.70°N 1.82°E

The canton of Lavaur Cocagne is an administrative division of the Tarn department, southern France. It was created at the French canton reorganisation which came into effect in March 2015. Its seat is in Lavaur.

It consists of the following communes:

1. Aguts
2. Algans
3. Bannières
4. Belcastel
5. Cambon-lès-Lavaur
6. Cuq-Toulza
7. Labastide-Saint-Georges
8. Lacougotte-Cadoul
9. Lacroisille
10. Lavaur
11. Marzens
12. Massac-Séran
13. Maurens-Scopont
14. Montcabrier
15. Montgey
16. Mouzens
17. Péchaudier
18. Puéchoursi
19. Roquevidal
20. Teulat
21. Veilhes
22. Villeneuve-lès-Lavaur
23. Viviers-lès-Lavaur
