= Saint-Jean-de-Rives =

- Commune
- Coat of arms
- Location of Saint-Jean-de-Rives
- Location within France Location within Occitanie
- Coordinates: 43°44′39″N 1°46′33″E
- Country: France
- Region: Occitania
- Department: Tarn
- Arrondissement: Castres
- Canton: Les Portes du Tarn
- Intercommunality: CC Tarn-Agout

Government
  - Mayor (2020–2026): Jean Sendra
- Area^{1}: 6.02 km^{2} (2.32 sq mi)
- Elevation: 125 m (410 ft)
- Highest elevation: 207 m (679 ft)
- Lowest elevation: 95 m (312 ft)
- Population (2023): 516
  - Density: 85.7/km^{2} (222/sq mi)
- Time zone: UTC+01:00 (CET)
  - Summer (DST): UTC+02:00 (CEST)
- INSEE/Postal code: 81255 /81500
- ^{1} French Land Register data, which excludes lakes, ponds, glaciers > 1 km^{2} (0.386 sq mi or 247 acres) and river estuaries.

Saint-Jean-de-Rives (French pronunciation: [sɛ̃ ʒɑ̃ də ʁiv]; Languedocien: Sant Joan de Ribas) is a commune in the Tarn department in southern France.

== See also ==
- Communes of the Tarn department
