= Garrigues, Tarn =

Garrigues
- Commune
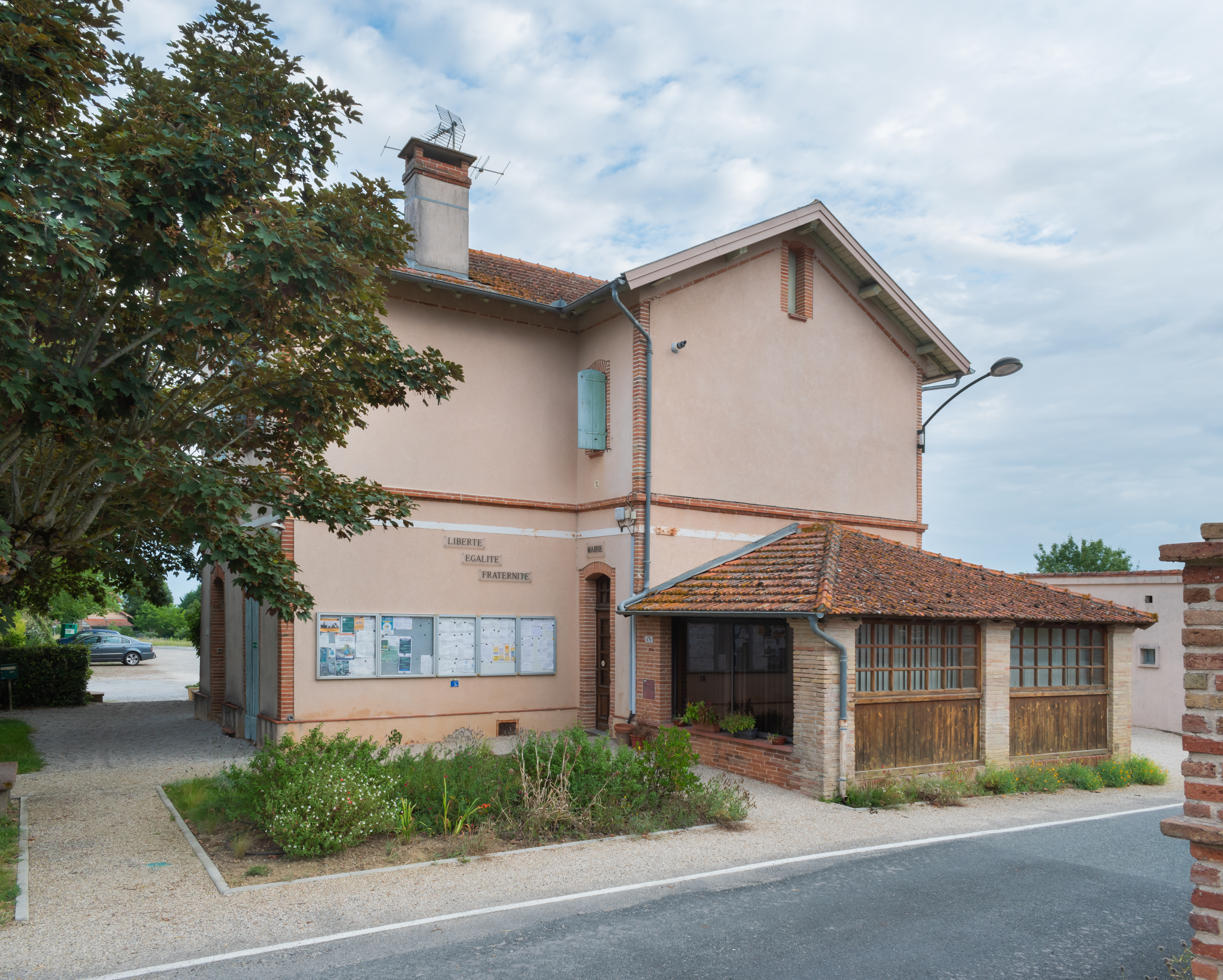
- Town hall of Garrigues

- Coat of arms
- Location of Garrigues
- Location within France Location within Occitanie
- Coordinates: 43°41′39″N 1°43′11″E
- Country: France
- Region: Occitania
- Department: Tarn
- Arrondissement: Castres
- Canton: Les Portes du Tarn
- Intercommunality: CC Tarn-Agout

Government
  - Mayor (2020–2026): Pierre Comoy
- Area^{1}: 10.51 km^{2} (4.06 sq mi)
- Elevation: 248 m (814 ft)
- Highest elevation: 244 m (801 ft)
- Lowest elevation: 148 m (486 ft)
- Population (2023): 333
  - Density: 31.7/km^{2} (82.1/sq mi)
- Time zone: UTC+01:00 (CET)
  - Summer (DST): UTC+02:00 (CEST)
- INSEE/Postal code: 81102 /81500
- ^{1} French Land Register data, which excludes lakes, ponds, glaciers > 1 km^{2} (0.386 sq mi or 247 acres) and river estuaries.

Garrigues (French pronunciation: [ɡaʁiɡ]; Languedocien: Garrigas) is a commune in the Tarn department in southern France.

== See also ==
- Communes of the Tarn department
