= Lacougotte-Cadoul =

- Commune
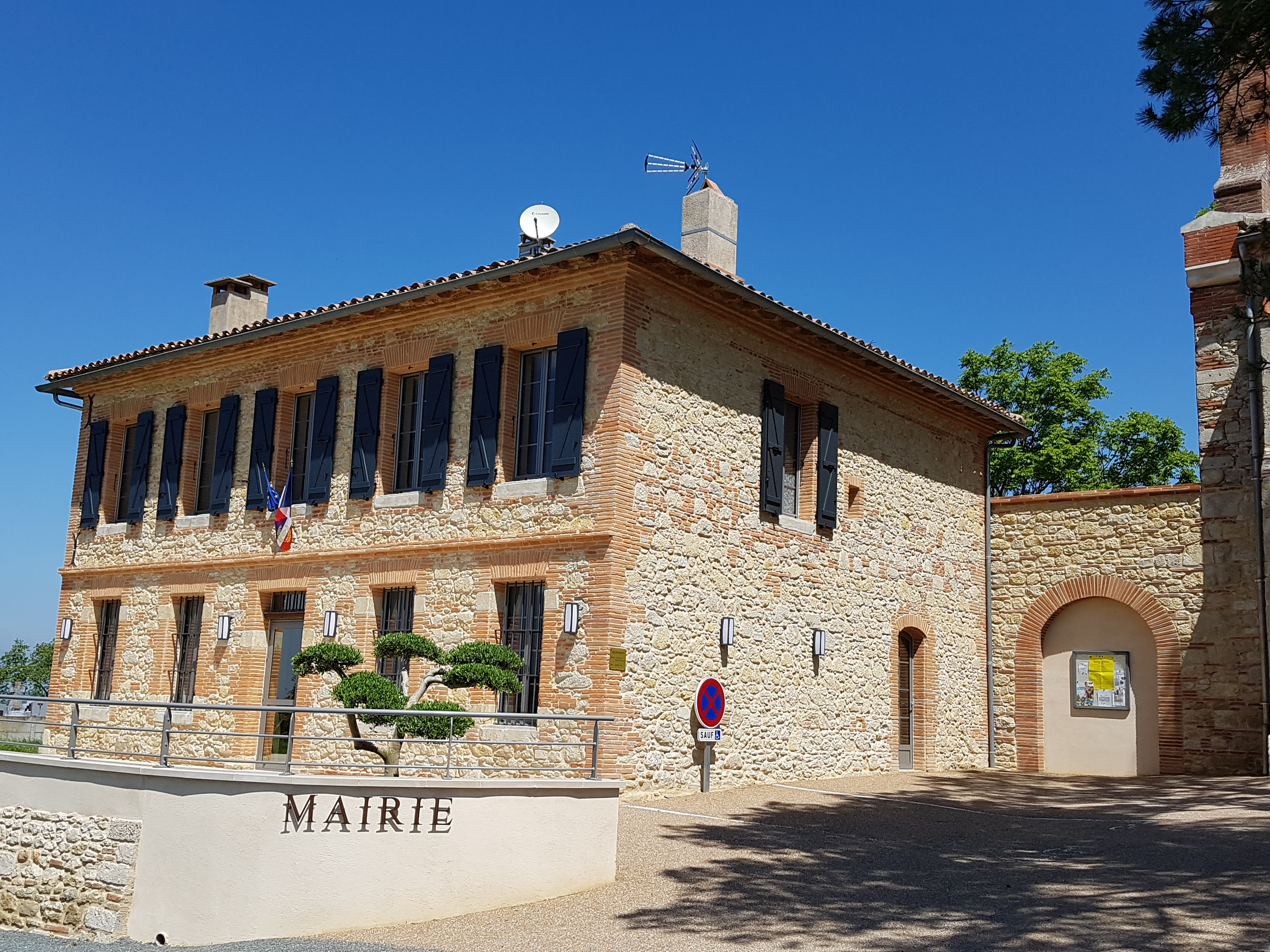
- Town hall

- Coat of arms
- Location of Lacougotte-Cadoul
- Location within France Location within Occitanie
- Coordinates: 43°38′30″N 1°49′42″E
- Country: France
- Region: Occitania
- Department: Tarn
- Arrondissement: Castres
- Canton: Lavaur Cocagne

Government
  - Mayor (2020–2026): Gérard Rex
- Area^{1}: 8.81 km^{2} (3.40 sq mi)
- Elevation: 285 m (935 ft)
- Highest elevation: 291 m (955 ft)
- Lowest elevation: 184 m (604 ft)
- Population (2023): 173
  - Density: 19.6/km^{2} (50.9/sq mi)
- Time zone: UTC+01:00 (CET)
  - Summer (DST): UTC+02:00 (CEST)
- INSEE/Postal code: 81126 /81500
- ^{1} French Land Register data, which excludes lakes, ponds, glaciers > 1 km^{2} (0.386 sq mi or 247 acres) and river estuaries.

Lacougotte-Cadoul (French pronunciation: [lakuɡɔt kadul]; Occitan: La Cogòta Cadol) is a commune in the Tarn department in southern France.

== See also ==
- Communes of the Tarn department
