= Ambres =

- Commune
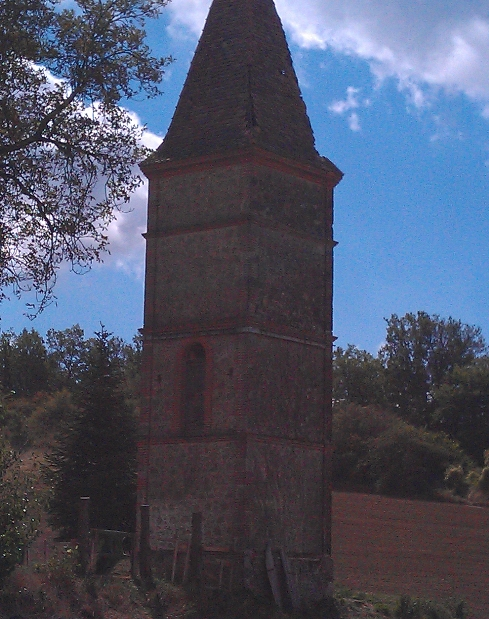
- The Montplaisir Dovecote, in Ambres

- Coat of arms
- Location of Ambres
- Location within France Location within Occitanie
- Coordinates: 43°43′58″N 1°48′51″E
- Country: France
- Region: Occitania
- Department: Tarn
- Arrondissement: Castres
- Canton: Les Portes du Tarn
- Intercommunality: CC Tarn-Agout

Government
  - Mayor (2023–2026): Bénédicte Portal
- Area^{1}: 19.11 km^{2} (7.38 sq mi)
- Elevation: 201 m (659 ft)
- Highest elevation: 225 m (738 ft)
- Lowest elevation: 100 m (330 ft)
- Population (2023): 1,033
  - Density: 54.06/km^{2} (140.0/sq mi)
- Time zone: UTC+01:00 (CET)
  - Summer (DST): UTC+02:00 (CEST)
- INSEE/Postal code: 81011 /81500
- ^{1} French Land Register data, which excludes lakes, ponds, glaciers > 1 km^{2} (0.386 sq mi or 247 acres) and river estuaries.

Ambres (French pronunciation: [ɑ̃bʁ]) is a commune in the Tarn department and Occitanie region of southern France.

== Geography ==
The river Dadou flows into the Agout in the commune.

== See also ==
- Communes of the Tarn department
