= Arrondissement of Castres =

Coordinates: 43°36′N 2°14′E

Castres
- Arrondissement
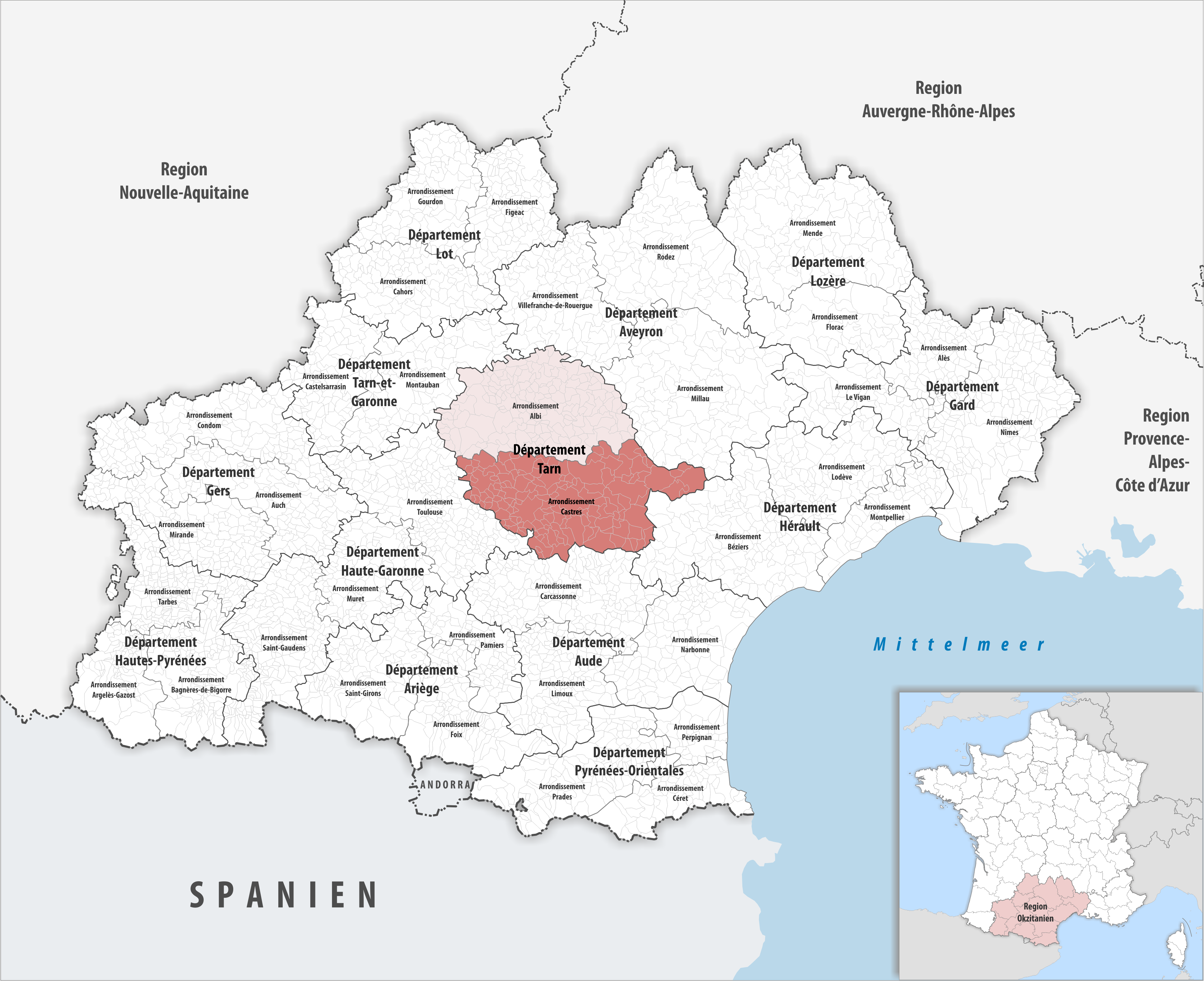
- Location within the region Occitanie
- Country: France
- Region: Occitania
- Department: Tarn
- No. of communes: {{{nbcomm}}}
- Area: 3,026.2 km^{2} (1,168.4 sq mi)
- Population (2023): 198,693
  - Density: 65.658/km^{2} (170.05/sq mi)
- INSEE code: 812

The arrondissement of Castres is an arrondissement of France in the Tarn department in the Occitanie region. Its INSEE code is 812 and its capital city is Castres. It has 151 communes. Its population is 198,088 (2021), and its area is 3,026.2 km^{2} (1,168.4 sq mi). It is the southernmost arrondissement of the department.

Castres is known for its Rugby Team Le Castres Olympique (CO).

== Geography ==
The arrondissement of Castres is bordered to the north by the arrondissement of Albi, to the northeast by the Aveyron department, to the east by the Hérault department, to the south by the Aude department and to the west by the Haute-Garonne department.

== Composition ==
The communes of the arrondissement of Castres, and their INSEE codes, are:

1. Aguts (81001)
2. Aiguefonde (81002)
3. Albine (81005)
4. Algans (81006)
5. Ambres (81011)
6. Anglès (81014)
7. Appelle (81015)
8. Arfons (81016)
9. Arifat (81017)
10. Aussillon (81021)
11. Bannières (81022)
12. Barre (81023)
13. Belcastel (81025)
14. Belleserre (81027)
15. Berlats (81028)
16. Bertre (81030)
17. Le Bez (81031)
18. Blan (81032)
19. Boissezon (81034)
20. Bout-du-Pont-de-Larn (81036)
21. Brassac (81037)
22. Briatexte (81039)
23. Brousse (81040)
24. Burlats (81042)
25. Busque (81043)
26. Cabanès (81044)
27. Cahuzac (81049)
28. Cambon-lès-Lavaur (81050)
29. Cambounès (81053)
30. Cambounet-sur-le-Sor (81054)
31. Les Cammazes (81055)
32. Carbes (81058)
33. Castres (81065)
34. Caucalières (81066)
35. Cuq (81075)
36. Cuq-Toulza (81076)
37. Damiatte (81078)
38. Dourgne (81081)
39. Durfort (81083)
40. Escoussens (81084)
41. Escroux (81085)
42. Espérausses (81086)
43. Fiac (81092)
44. Fontrieu (81062)
45. Fréjeville (81098)
46. Garrevaques (81100)
47. Garrigues (81102)
48. Gijounet (81103)
49. Giroussens (81104)
50. Graulhet (81105)
51. Guitalens-L'Albarède (81132)
52. Jonquières (81109)
53. Labastide-Rouairoux (81115)
54. Labastide-Saint-Georges (81116)
55. Laboulbène (81118)
56. Labruguière (81120)
57. Lacabarède (81121)
58. Lacaune (81124)
59. Lacaze (81125)
60. Lacougotte-Cadoul (81126)
61. Lacroisille (81127)
62. Lacrouzette (81128)
63. Lagardiolle (81129)
64. Lagarrigue (81130)
65. Lamontélarié (81134)
66. Lasfaillades (81137)
67. Lautrec (81139)
68. Lavaur (81140)
69. Lempaut (81142)
70. Lescout (81143)
71. Lugan (81150)
72. Magrin (81151)
73. Marzens (81157)
74. Le Masnau-Massuguiès (81158)
75. Massac-Séran (81159)
76. Massaguel (81160)
77. Maurens-Scopont (81162)
78. Mazamet (81163)
79. Missècle (81169)
80. Montcabrier (81173)
81. Montdragon (81174)
82. Montfa (81177)
83. Montgey (81179)
84. Montpinier (81181)
85. Montredon-Labessonnié (81182)
86. Mont-Roc (81183)
87. Moulayrès (81187)
88. Moulin-Mage (81188)
89. Mouzens (81189)
90. Murat-sur-Vèbre (81192)
91. Nages (81193)
92. Navès (81195)
93. Noailhac (81196)
94. Palleville (81200)
95. Payrin-Augmontel (81204)
96. Péchaudier (81205)
97. Peyregoux (81207)
98. Pont-de-Larn (81209)
99. Poudis (81210)
100. Prades (81212)
101. Pratviel (81213)
102. Puéchoursi (81214)
103. Puybegon (81215)
104. Puycalvel (81216)
105. Puylaurens (81219)
106. Rayssac (81221)
107. Le Rialet (81223)
108. Roquecourbe (81227)
109. Roquevidal (81229)
110. Rouairoux (81231)
111. Saint-Affrique-les-Montagnes (81235)
112. Saint-Agnan (81236)
113. Saint-Amancet (81237)
114. Saint-Amans-Soult (81238)
115. Saint-Amans-Valtoret (81239)
116. Saint-Avit (81242)
117. Saint-Gauzens (81248)
118. Saint-Genest-de-Contest (81250)
119. Saint-Germain-des-Prés (81251)
120. Saint-Germier (81252)
121. Saint-Jean-de-Rives (81255)
122. Saint-Jean-de-Vals (81256)
123. Saint-Julien-du-Puy (81258)
124. Saint-Lieux-lès-Lavaur (81261)
125. Saint-Paul-Cap-de-Joux (81266)
126. Saint-Pierre-de-Trivisy (81267)
127. Saint-Salvi-de-Carcavès (81268)
128. Saint-Salvy-de-la-Balme (81269)
129. Saint-Sernin-lès-Lavaur (81270)
130. Saint-Sulpice-la-Pointe (81271)
131. Saïx (81273)
132. Sauveterre (81278)
133. Sémalens (81281)
134. Senaux (81282)
135. Serviès (81286)
136. Sorèze (81288)
137. Soual (81289)
138. Teulat (81298)
139. Teyssode (81299)
140. Vabre (81305)
141. Valdurenque (81307)
142. Veilhes (81310)
143. Vénès (81311)
144. Verdalle (81312)
145. Viane (81314)
146. Vielmur-sur-Agout (81315)
147. Villeneuve-lès-Lavaur (81318)
148. Le Vintrou (81321)
149. Viterbe (81323)
150. Viviers-lès-Lavaur (81324)
151. Viviers-lès-Montagnes (81325)

== History ==
The arrondissement of Castres was created in 1800.

As a result of the reorganisation of the cantons of France which came into effect in 2015, the borders of the cantons are no longer related to the borders of the arrondissements. The cantons of the arrondissement of Castres were, as of January 2015:

1. Anglès
2. Brassac
3. Castres-Est
4. Castres-Nord
5. Castres-Ouest
6. Castres-Sud
7. Cuq-Toulza
8. Dourgne
9. Graulhet
10. Labruguière
11. Lacaune
12. Lautrec
13. Lavaur
14. Mazamet-Nord-Est
15. Mazamet-Sud-Ouest
16. Montredon-Labessonnié
17. Murat-sur-Vèbre
18. Puylaurens
19. Roquecourbe
20. Saint-Amans-Soult
21. Saint-Paul-Cap-de-Joux
22. Vabre
23. Vielmur-sur-Agout
