= Labastide-Saint-Georges =

- Commune
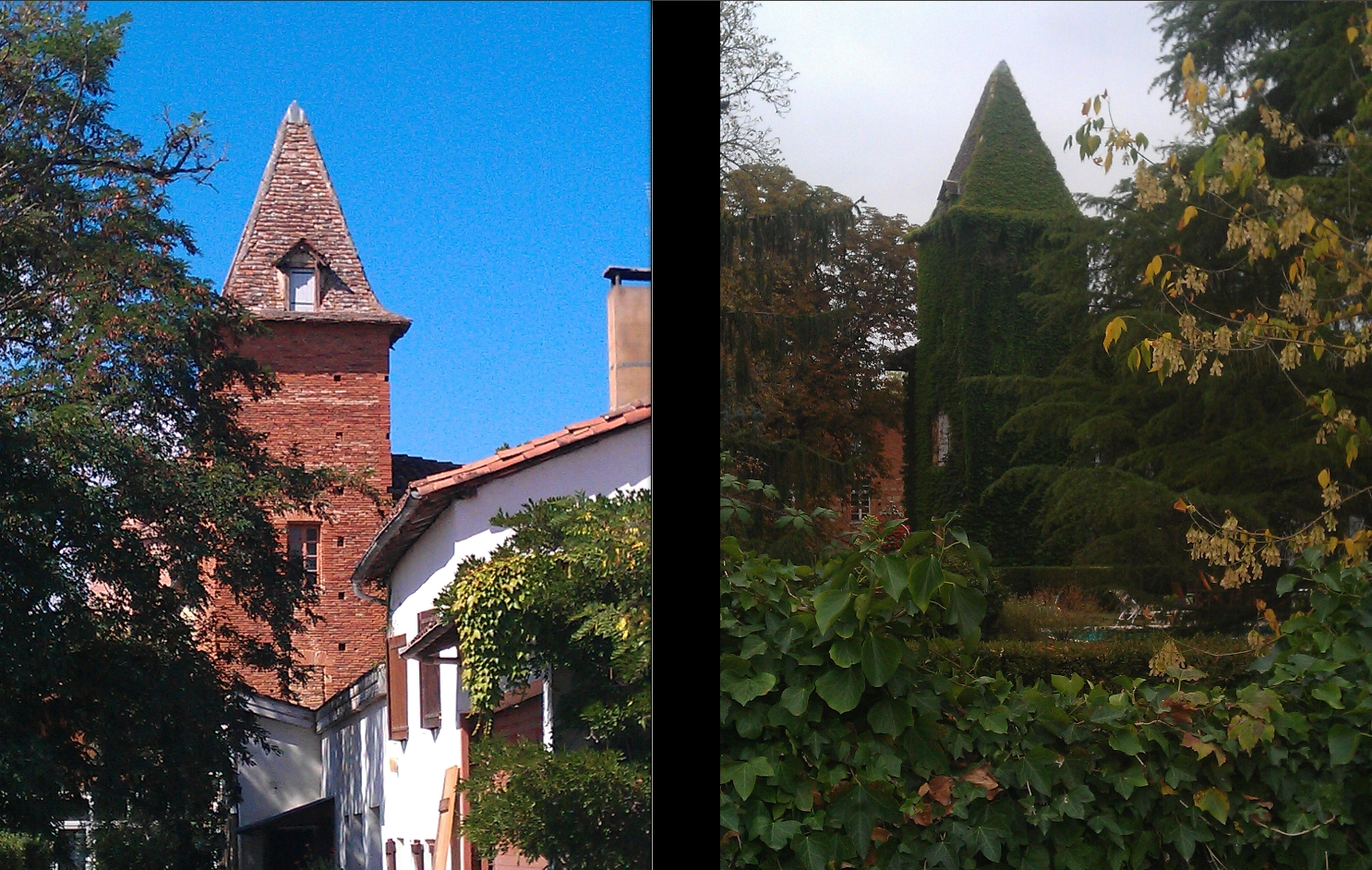
- Views of the chateau in Labastide-Saint-Georges

- Coat of arms
- Location of Labastide-Saint-Georges
- Location within France Location within Occitanie
- Coordinates: 43°42′04″N 1°50′43″E
- Country: France
- Region: Occitania
- Department: Tarn
- Arrondissement: Castres
- Canton: Lavaur Cocagne
- Intercommunality: Tarn-Agout

Government
  - Mayor (2020–2026): Emmanuel Joulié
- Area^{1}: 6,023 km^{2} (2,325 sq mi)
- Elevation: 145 m (476 ft)
- Highest elevation: 203 m (666 ft)
- Lowest elevation: 110 m (360 ft)
- Population (2023): 2,002
  - Density: 0.3324/km^{2} (0.8609/sq mi)
- Time zone: UTC+01:00 (CET)
  - Summer (DST): UTC+02:00 (CEST)
- INSEE/Postal code: 81116 /81500
- ^{1} French Land Register data, which excludes lakes, ponds, glaciers > 1 km^{2} (0.386 sq mi or 247 acres) and river estuaries.

Labastide-Saint-Georges (French pronunciation: [labastid sɛ̃ ʒɔʁʒ]; Occitan: La Bastida de Sant Jòrdi) is a commune in the Tarn department in southern France specifically the Occitania region.

== Population ==
Historical population
Year	Pop.	±% p.a.
1968	527	—
1975	872	+7.46%
1982	1,005	+2.05%
1990	1,063	+0.70%
1999	1,235	+1.68%
2007	1,627	+3.51%
2012	1,891	+3.05%
2017	1,929	+0.40%
2023	2,002	+0.62%
Source: INSEE

== See also ==
- Communes of the Tarn department
