= Roquevidal =

- Commune
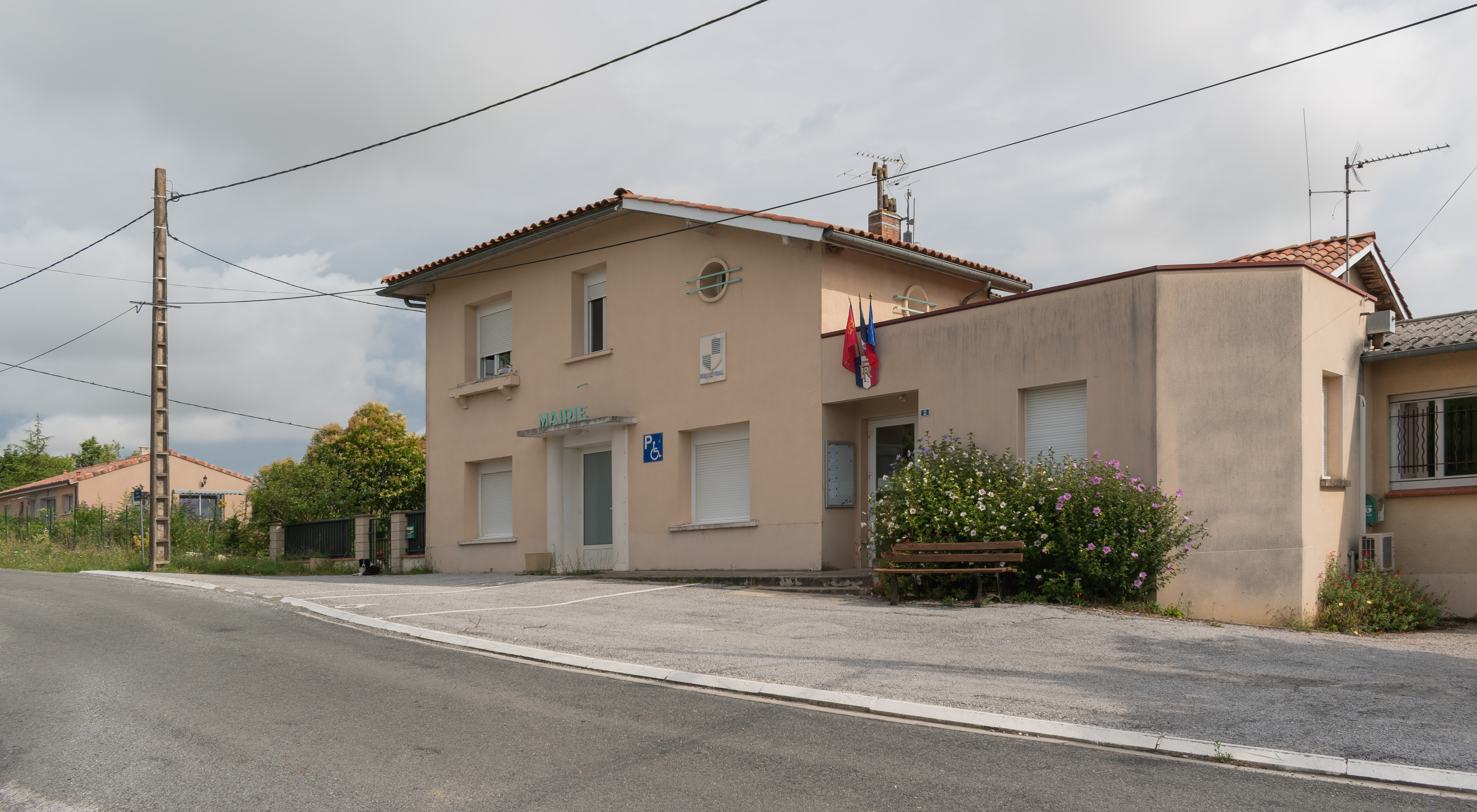
- Town hall of Roquevidal

- Coat of arms
- Location of Roquevidal
- Location within France Location within Occitanie
- Coordinates: 43°37′36″N 1°51′50″E
- Country: France
- Region: Occitania
- Department: Tarn
- Arrondissement: Castres
- Canton: Lavaur Cocagne

Government
  - Mayor (2020–2026): Jean-Marie Joulia
- Area^{1}: 7.71 km^{2} (2.98 sq mi)
- Elevation: 302 m (991 ft)
- Highest elevation: 306 m (1,004 ft)
- Lowest elevation: 206 m (676 ft)
- Population (2023): 141
  - Density: 18.3/km^{2} (47.4/sq mi)
- Time zone: UTC+01:00 (CET)
  - Summer (DST): UTC+02:00 (CEST)
- INSEE/Postal code: 81229 /81470
- ^{1} French Land Register data, which excludes lakes, ponds, glaciers > 1 km^{2} (0.386 sq mi or 247 acres) and river estuaries.

Roquevidal (French pronunciation: [ʁɔk(ə)vidal]; Occitan: Ròcavidal) is a commune in the Tarn department in southern France.

== See also ==
- Communes of the Tarn department
