= Canton of Les Portes du Tarn =

Coordinates: 43.77°N 1.68°E

The canton of Les Portes du Tarn is an administrative division of the Tarn department, southern France. It was created at the French canton reorganisation which came into effect in March 2015. Its seat is in Saint-Sulpice-la-Pointe.

It consists of the following communes:

1. Ambres
2. Coufouleux
3. Garrigues
4. Giroussens
5. Loupiac
6. Lugan
7. Saint-Agnan
8. Saint-Jean-de-Rives
9. Saint-Lieux-lès-Lavaur
10. Saint-Sulpice-la-Pointe
