= Aguts =

- Commune
- Coat of arms
- Location of Aguts
- Location within France Location within Occitanie
- Coordinates: 43°31′53″N 1°55′17″E
- Country: France
- Region: Occitania
- Department: Tarn
- Arrondissement: Castres
- Canton: Lavaur Cocagne
- Intercommunality: Sor et Agout

Government
  - Mayor (2020–2026): Francis Cescato
- Area^{1}: 9.79 km^{2} (3.78 sq mi)
- Elevation: 303 m (994 ft)
- Highest elevation: 320 m (1,050 ft)
- Lowest elevation: 182 m (597 ft)
- Population (2023): 238
  - Density: 24.3/km^{2} (63.0/sq mi)
- Time zone: UTC+01:00 (CET)
  - Summer (DST): UTC+02:00 (CEST)
- INSEE/Postal code: 81001 /81470
- ^{1} French Land Register data, which excludes lakes, ponds, glaciers > 1 km^{2} (0.386 sq mi or 247 acres) and river estuaries.

Aguts is a commune in the Tarn department and Occitanie region of southern France.

The name comes from the Latin acutus, meaning "pointed (summit)".

== Population ==
Historical population
Year	Pop.	±% p.a.
1968	217	—
1975	177	−2.87%
1982	193	+1.24%
1990	164	−2.01%
1999	187	+1.47%
2007	218	+1.94%
2012	229	+0.99%
2017	223	−0.53%
2023	238	+1.09%
Source: INSEE

== See also ==
- Communes of the Tarn department
