= Puéchoursi =

- Commune
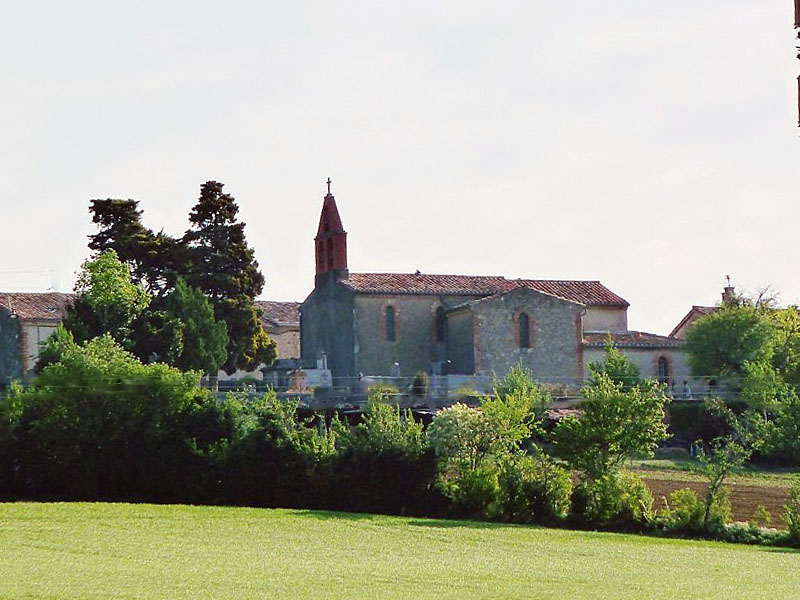

- Coat of arms
- Location of Puéchoursi
- Location within France Location within Occitanie
- Coordinates: 43°31′07″N 1°54′28″E
- Country: France
- Region: Occitania
- Department: Tarn
- Arrondissement: Castres
- Canton: Lavaur Cocagne
- Intercommunality: CC aux sources du Canal du Midi

Government
  - Mayor (2020–2026): Bertrand Géli
- Area^{1}: 3.55 km^{2} (1.37 sq mi)
- Elevation: 275 m (902 ft)
- Highest elevation: 322 m (1,056 ft)
- Lowest elevation: 206 m (676 ft)
- Population (2023): 114
  - Density: 32.1/km^{2} (83.2/sq mi)
- Time zone: UTC+01:00 (CET)
  - Summer (DST): UTC+02:00 (CEST)
- INSEE/Postal code: 81214 /81470
- ^{1} French Land Register data, which excludes lakes, ponds, glaciers > 1 km^{2} (0.386 sq mi or 247 acres) and river estuaries.

Puéchoursi (French pronunciation: [pɥeʃuʁsi]; Occitan: Puèch Orsin, meaning bear mountain) is a commune in the Tarn department in southern France.

== See also ==
- Communes of the Tarn department
