= Massac-Séran =

- Commune
- Coat of arms
- Location of Massac-Séran
- Location within France Location within Occitanie
- Coordinates: 43°39′47″N 1°51′40″E
- Country: France
- Region: Occitania
- Department: Tarn
- Arrondissement: Castres
- Canton: Lavaur Cocagne

Government
  - Mayor (2020–2026): Viviane Bonhomme
- Area^{1}: 8.52 km^{2} (3.29 sq mi)
- Elevation: 220 m (720 ft)
- Highest elevation: 274 m (899 ft)
- Lowest elevation: 147 m (482 ft)
- Population (2023): 523
  - Density: 61.4/km^{2} (159/sq mi)
- Time zone: UTC+01:00 (CET)
  - Summer (DST): UTC+02:00 (CEST)
- INSEE/Postal code: 81159 /81500
- ^{1} French Land Register data, which excludes lakes, ponds, glaciers > 1 km^{2} (0.386 sq mi or 247 acres) and river estuaries.

Massac-Séran (French pronunciation: [masak seʁɑ̃]; Occitan: Maçac) is a commune in the Tarn department in southern France.

== See also ==
- Communes of the Tarn department
