= Péchaudier =

- Commune
- Coat of arms
- Location of Péchaudier
- Location within France Location within Occitanie
- Coordinates: 43°32′45″N 1°56′45″E
- Country: France
- Region: Occitania
- Department: Tarn
- Arrondissement: Castres
- Canton: Lavaur Cocagne
- Intercommunality: CC du Sor et de l'Agout

Government
  - Mayor (2020–2026): Alain Rivals
- Area^{1}: 6.8 km^{2} (2.6 sq mi)
- Elevation: 220 m (720 ft)
- Highest elevation: 242 m (794 ft)
- Lowest elevation: 183 m (600 ft)
- Population (2023): 183
  - Density: 27/km^{2} (70/sq mi)
- Time zone: UTC+01:00 (CET)
  - Summer (DST): UTC+02:00 (CEST)
- INSEE/Postal code: 81205 /81470
- ^{1} French Land Register data, which excludes lakes, ponds, glaciers > 1 km^{2} (0.386 sq mi or 247 acres) and river estuaries.

Péchaudier (French pronunciation: [peʃodje]; Occitan: Puèjaudièr) is a commune in the Tarn department in southern France.

== See also ==
- Communes of the Tarn department
