= Belcastel, Tarn =

Belcastel
- Commune
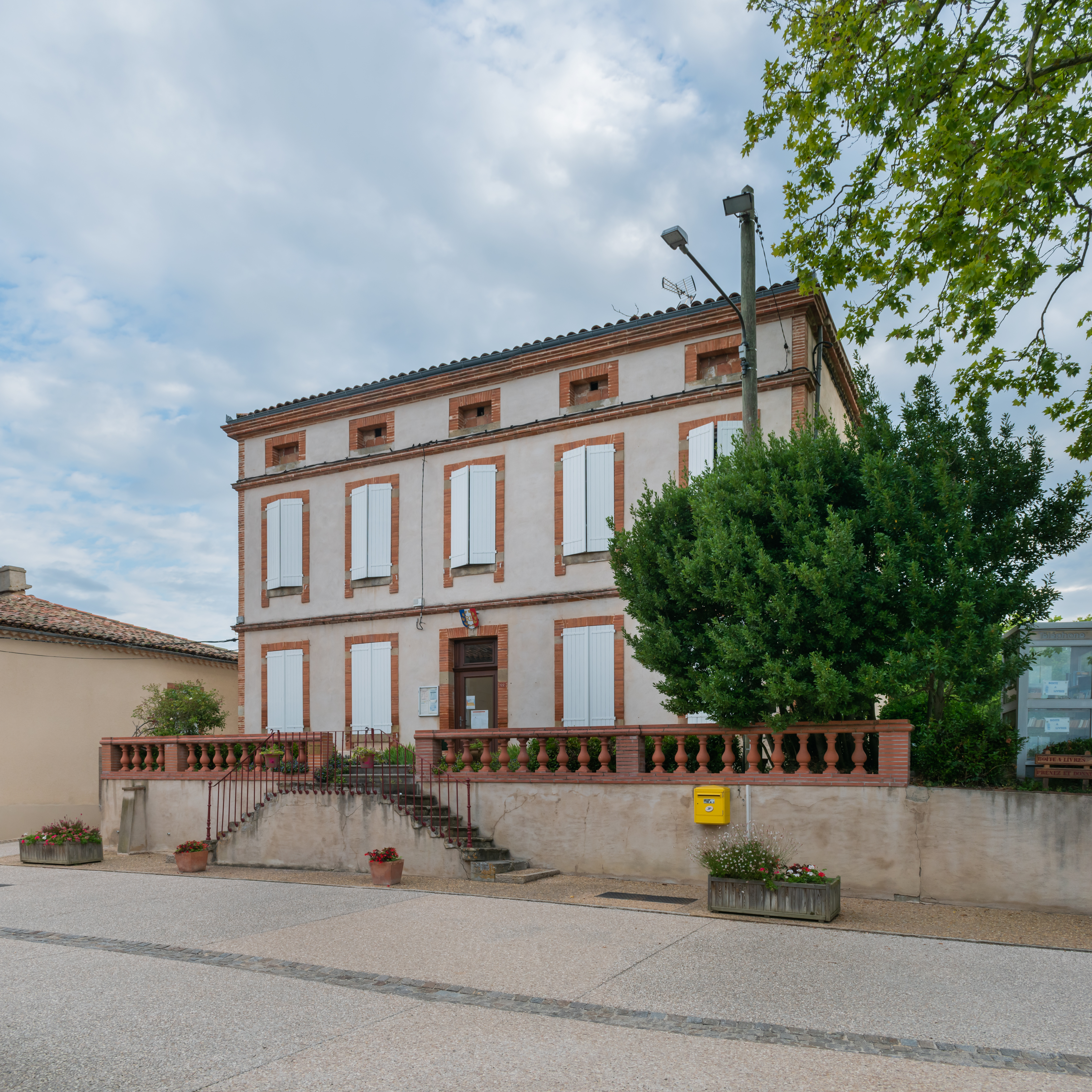
- Town hall of Belcastel

- Coat of arms
- Location of Belcastel
- Location within France Location within Occitanie
- Coordinates: 43°39′00″N 1°45′25″E
- Country: France
- Region: Occitania
- Department: Tarn
- Arrondissement: Castres
- Canton: Lavaur Cocagne

Government
  - Mayor (2020–2026): Christophe Esparbié
- Area^{1}: 10.81 km^{2} (4.17 sq mi)
- Elevation: 210 m (690 ft)
- Highest elevation: 271 m (889 ft)
- Lowest elevation: 173 m (568 ft)
- Population (2023): 216
  - Density: 20.0/km^{2} (51.8/sq mi)
- Time zone: UTC+01:00 (CET)
  - Summer (DST): UTC+02:00 (CEST)
- INSEE/Postal code: 81025 /81500
- ^{1} French Land Register data, which excludes lakes, ponds, glaciers > 1 km^{2} (0.386 sq mi or 247 acres) and river estuaries.

Belcastel (French pronunciation: [bɛlkastɛl]; Occitan: Bèl Castèl, meaning beautiful castle) is a commune of the Tarn department of southern France.

== See also ==
- Communes of the Tarn department
