= Lacroisille =

- Commune
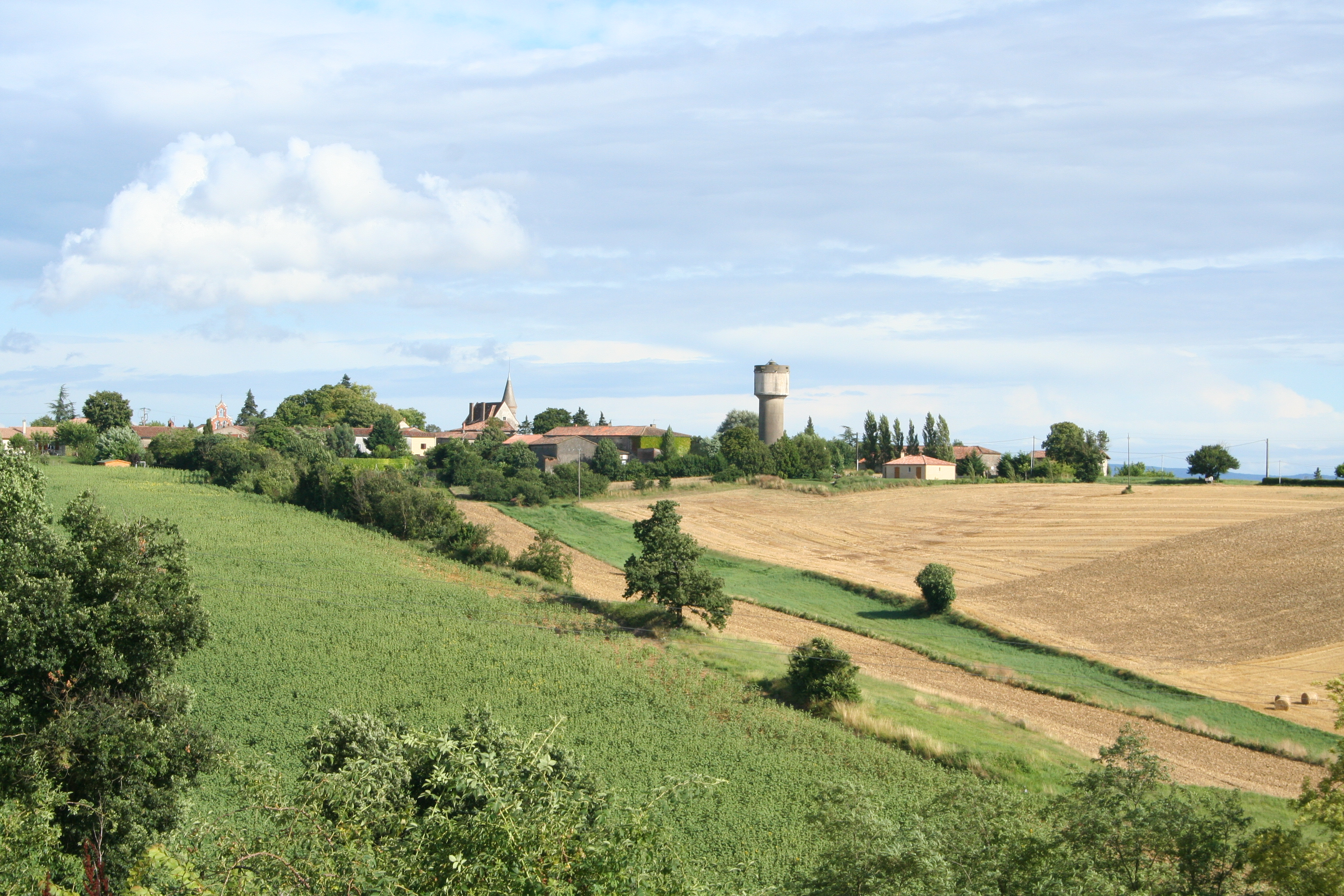
- A general view of Lacroisille

- Coat of arms
- Location of Lacroisille
- Location within France Location within Occitanie
- Coordinates: 43°35′04″N 1°55′52″E
- Country: France
- Region: Occitania
- Department: Tarn
- Arrondissement: Castres
- Canton: Lavaur Cocagne

Government
  - Mayor (2020–2026): Olivier Durand
- Area^{1}: 6.67 km^{2} (2.58 sq mi)
- Elevation: 320 m (1,050 ft)
- Highest elevation: 315 m (1,033 ft)
- Lowest elevation: 213 m (699 ft)
- Population (2023): 98
  - Density: 15/km^{2} (38/sq mi)
- Time zone: UTC+01:00 (CET)
  - Summer (DST): UTC+02:00 (CEST)
- INSEE/Postal code: 81127 /81470
- ^{1} French Land Register data, which excludes lakes, ponds, glaciers > 1 km^{2} (0.386 sq mi or 247 acres) and river estuaries.

Lacroisille (French pronunciation: [lakʁwazij]; Occitan: La Crosilha) is a commune in the Tarn department in southern France.

== See also ==
- Communes of the Tarn department
