= Cambon-lès-Lavaur =

- Commune
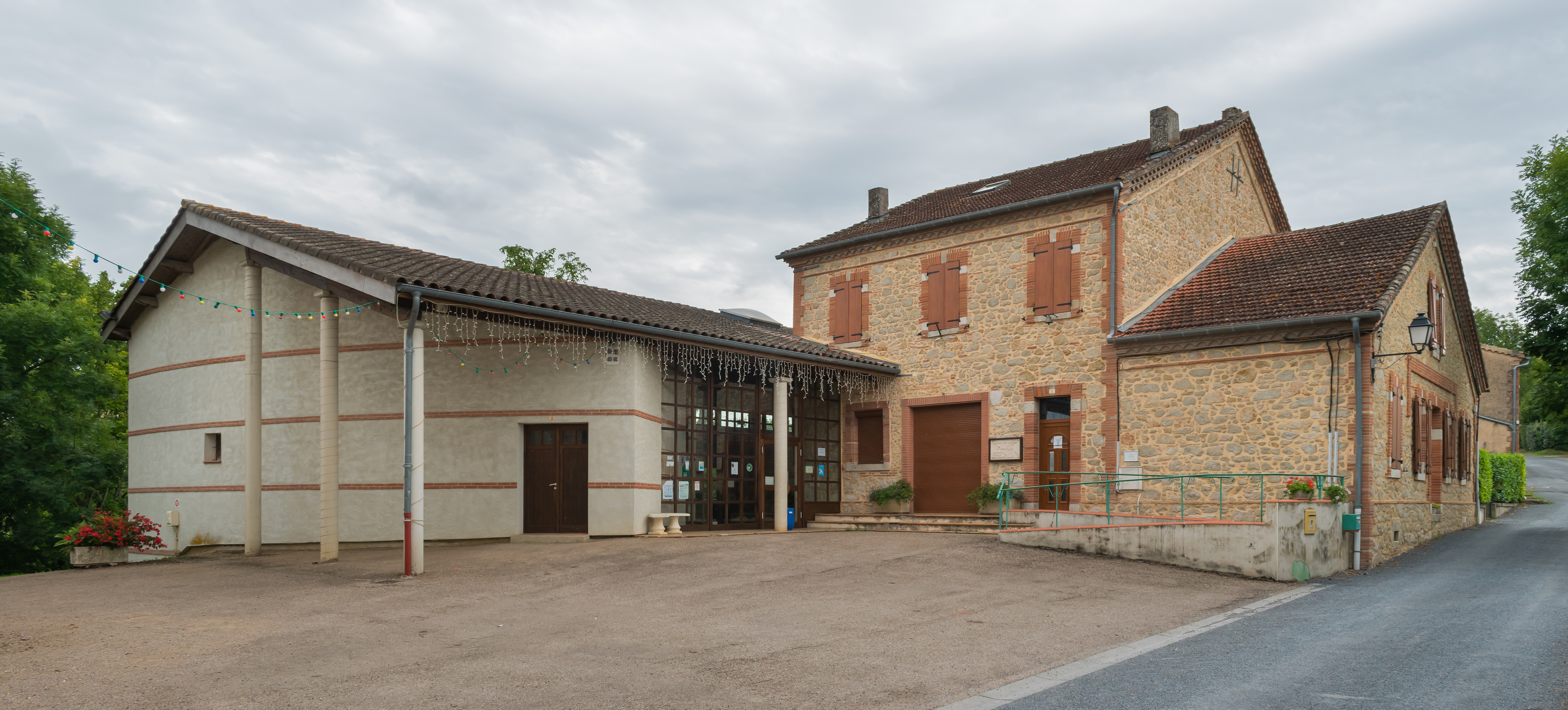
- Town hall

- Coat of arms
- Location of Cambon-lès-Lavaur
- Location within France Location within Occitanie
- Coordinates: 43°35′16″N 1°51′14″E
- Country: France
- Region: Occitania
- Department: Tarn
- Arrondissement: Castres
- Canton: Lavaur Cocagne
- Intercommunality: CC du Sor et de l'Agout

Government
  - Mayor (2020–2026): Pierre Virves
- Area^{1}: 12.14 km^{2} (4.69 sq mi)
- Elevation: 235 m (771 ft)
- Highest elevation: 272 m (892 ft)
- Lowest elevation: 176 m (577 ft)
- Population (2023): 362
  - Density: 29.8/km^{2} (77.2/sq mi)
- Time zone: UTC+01:00 (CET)
  - Summer (DST): UTC+02:00 (CEST)
- INSEE/Postal code: 81050 /81470
- ^{1} French Land Register data, which excludes lakes, ponds, glaciers > 1 km^{2} (0.386 sq mi or 247 acres) and river estuaries.

Cambon-lès-Lavaur (French pronunciation: [kɑ̃bɔ̃ lɛ lavɔʁ]; Occitan: Cambon de La Vaur) is a commune in the Tarn department in southern France.

== See also ==
- Communes of the Tarn department
