= Montcabrier, Tarn =

Montcabrier
- Commune
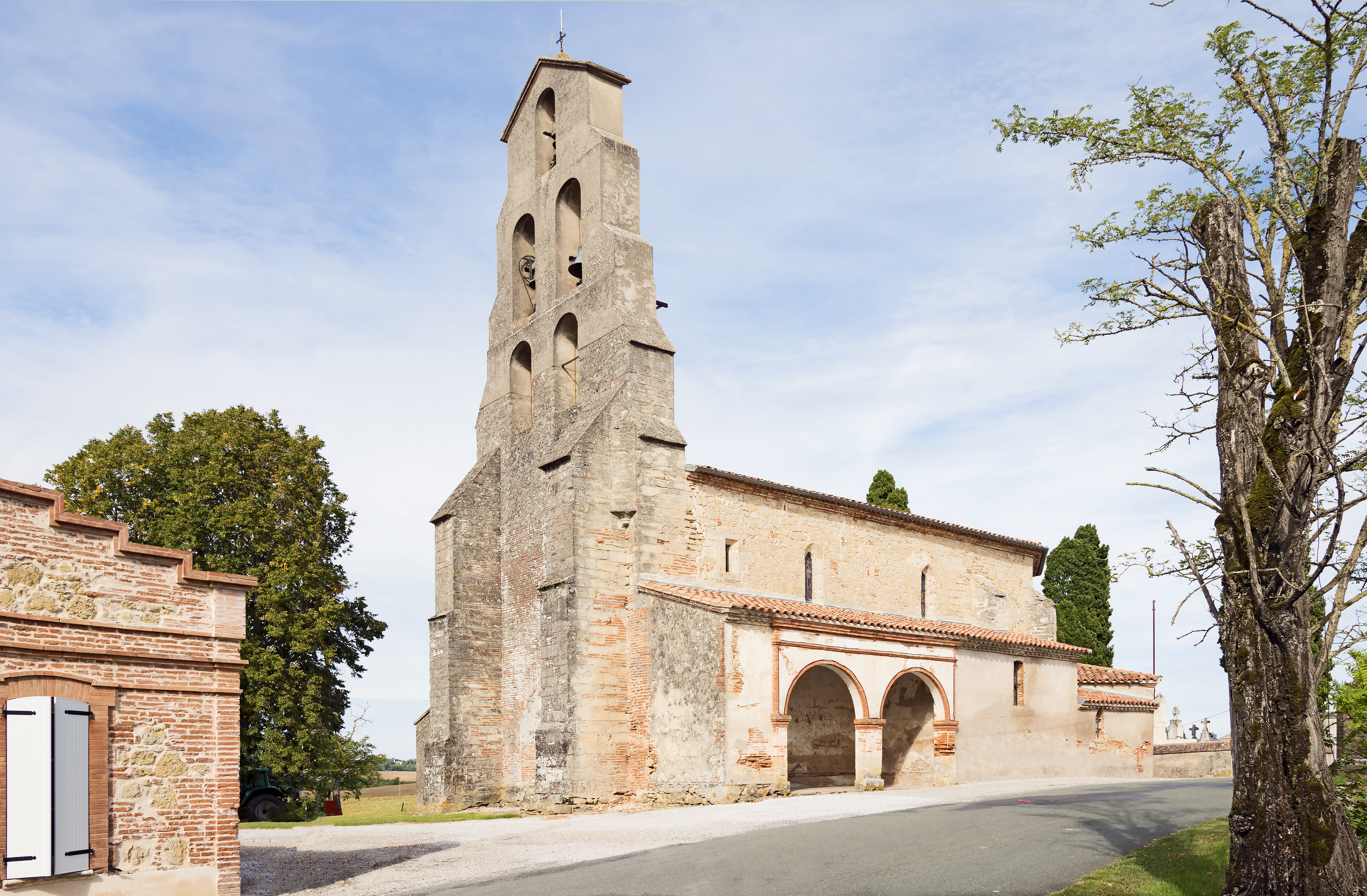
- The church in Montcabrier

- Coat of arms
- Location of Montcabrier
- Location within France Location within Occitanie
- Coordinates: 43°37′40″N 1°43′51″E
- Country: France
- Region: Occitania
- Department: Tarn
- Arrondissement: Castres
- Canton: Lavaur Cocagne

Government
  - Mayor (2020–2026): Didier Belaval
- Area^{1}: 5.43 km^{2} (2.10 sq mi)
- Elevation: 285 m (935 ft)
- Highest elevation: 254 m (833 ft)
- Lowest elevation: 158 m (518 ft)
- Population (2023): 304
  - Density: 56.0/km^{2} (145/sq mi)
- Time zone: UTC+01:00 (CET)
  - Summer (DST): UTC+02:00 (CEST)
- INSEE/Postal code: 81173 /81500
- ^{1} French Land Register data, which excludes lakes, ponds, glaciers > 1 km^{2} (0.386 sq mi or 247 acres) and river estuaries.

Montcabrier (French pronunciation: [mɔ̃kabʁije]; Occitan: Montcabrièr) is a commune in the Tarn department in southern France.

== Gallery ==
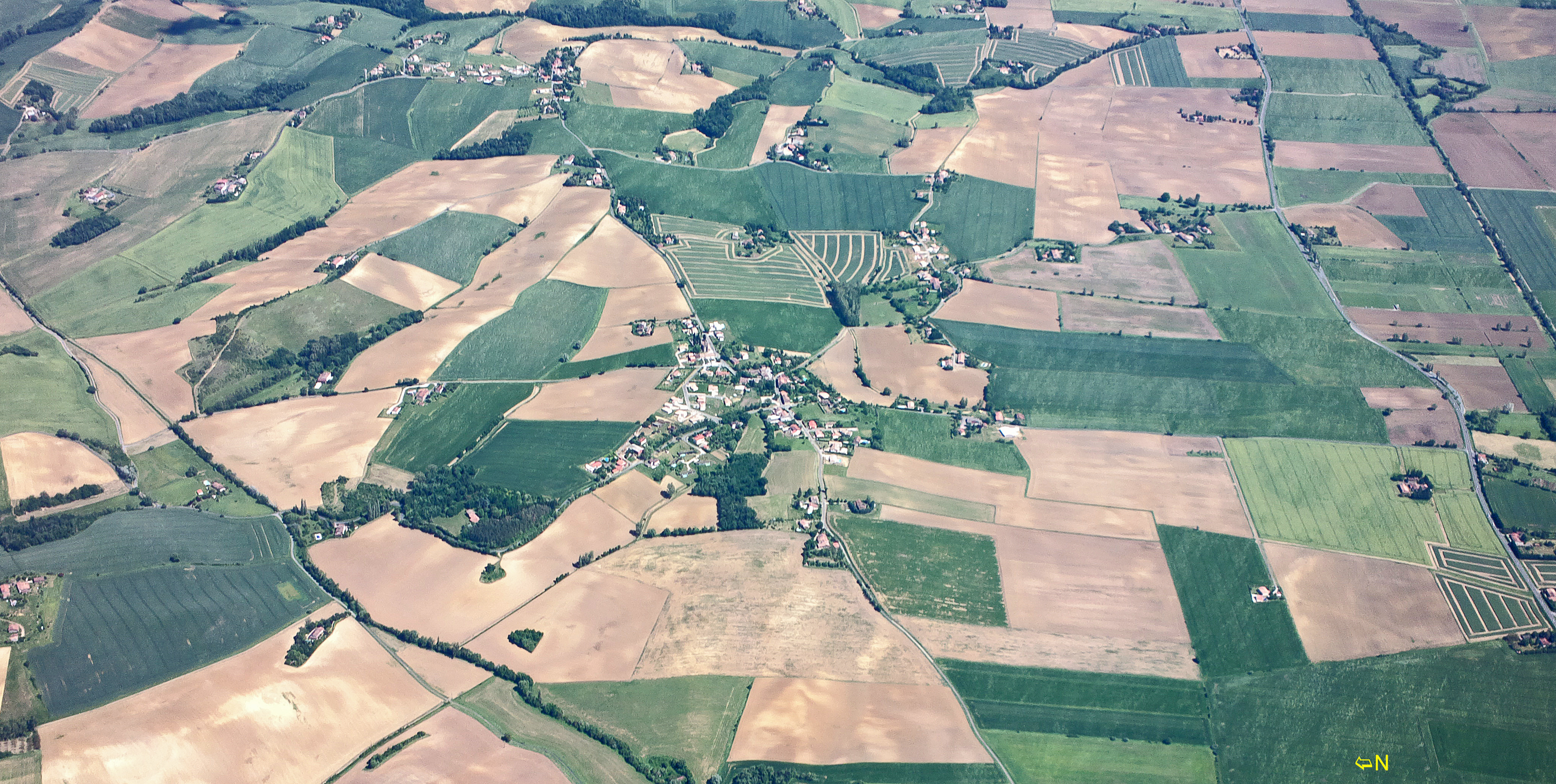
Montcabrier

== See also ==
- Communes of the Tarn department
