= Alan of Lavaur =

Saint Alan of Lavaur (French: Alain or Élan de Lavaur) is the saint to whom Lavaur Cathedral (Tarn, France) is dedicated. His feast day is 25 November.

Nothing is known of this saint, whose cult is attested to Lavaur. He is assumed to be a bishop and dated to the 7th century, but there is very little if any corroboration available, and it has been suggested that Alan of Lavaur may be nothing more than a pale reflection of the well-known Amand of Maastricht.

== Sources and external links ==
- Martyr-et-Saint.com: Alain de Lavaur (in French)
