= Lavaur, Tarn =

Lavaur
- Commune
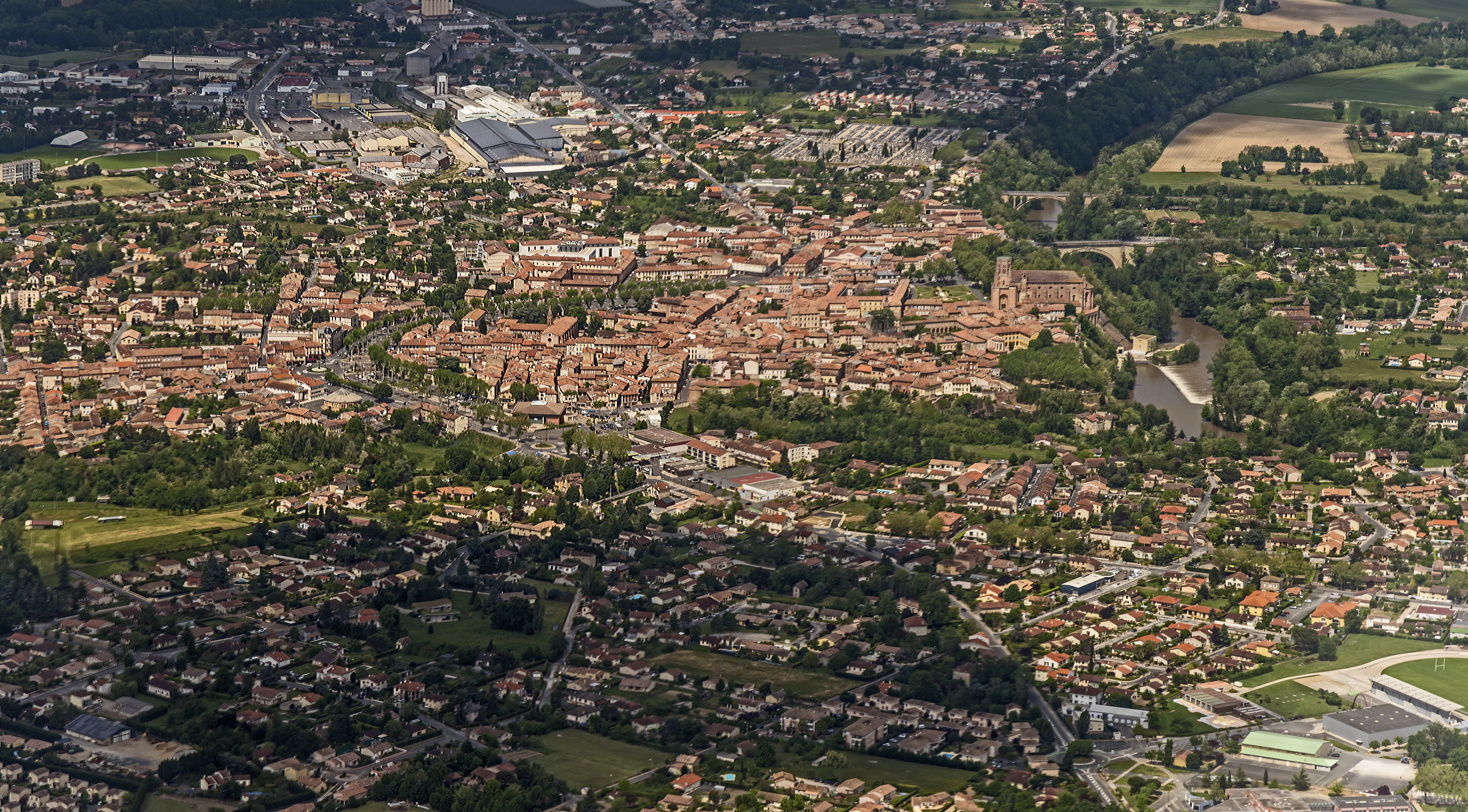
- An aerial view of Lavaur

- Coat of arms
- Location of Lavaur
- Location within France Location within Occitanie
- Coordinates: 43°41′59″N 1°49′11″E
- Country: France
- Region: Occitania
- Department: Tarn
- Arrondissement: Castres
- Canton: Lavaur Cocagne
- Intercommunality: CC Tarn-Agout

Government
  - Mayor (2020–2026): Bernard Carayon
- Area^{1}: 62.83 km^{2} (24.26 sq mi)
- Elevation: 141 m (463 ft)
- Highest elevation: 274 m (899 ft)
- Lowest elevation: 105 m (344 ft)
- Population (2023): 10,965
  - Density: 174.5/km^{2} (452.0/sq mi)
- Time zone: UTC+01:00 (CET)
  - Summer (DST): UTC+02:00 (CEST)
- INSEE/Postal code: 81140 /81500
- ^{1} French Land Register data, which excludes lakes, ponds, glaciers > 1 km^{2} (0.386 sq mi or 247 acres) and river estuaries.

Lavaur (French pronunciation: [lavɔʁ]; Occitan: La Vaur) is a commune in the Tarn department in southern France.

== History ==
Lavaur was taken in 1211 by Simon de Montfort during the wars of the Albigenses, a monument marking the site where Dame Giraude de Laurac (Lady of Lavaur) was killed, being thrown down a well and stoned to death. The town was also taken several times during the religious wars of the 16th century.

== Geography ==
Lavaur stands on the left bank of the Agout, which is here crossed by a railway-bridge and a fine stone bridge of the 1770s. It lies 36 km southwest of Albi and 32 km east of Toulouse.

== Demographics ==
Historical population
| Year | Pop. | ±% p.a. |
|---|---|---|
| 1968 | 7,665 | — |
| 1975 | 7,897 | +0.43% |
| 1982 | 7,972 | +0.14% |
| 1990 | 8,148 | +0.27% |
| 1999 | 8,537 | +0.52% |
| 2007 | 10,036 | +2.04% |
| 2012 | 10,242 | +0.41% |
| 2017 | 10,811 | +1.09% |
| 2023 | 10,965 | +0.24% |
Source: INSEE

== Sights ==
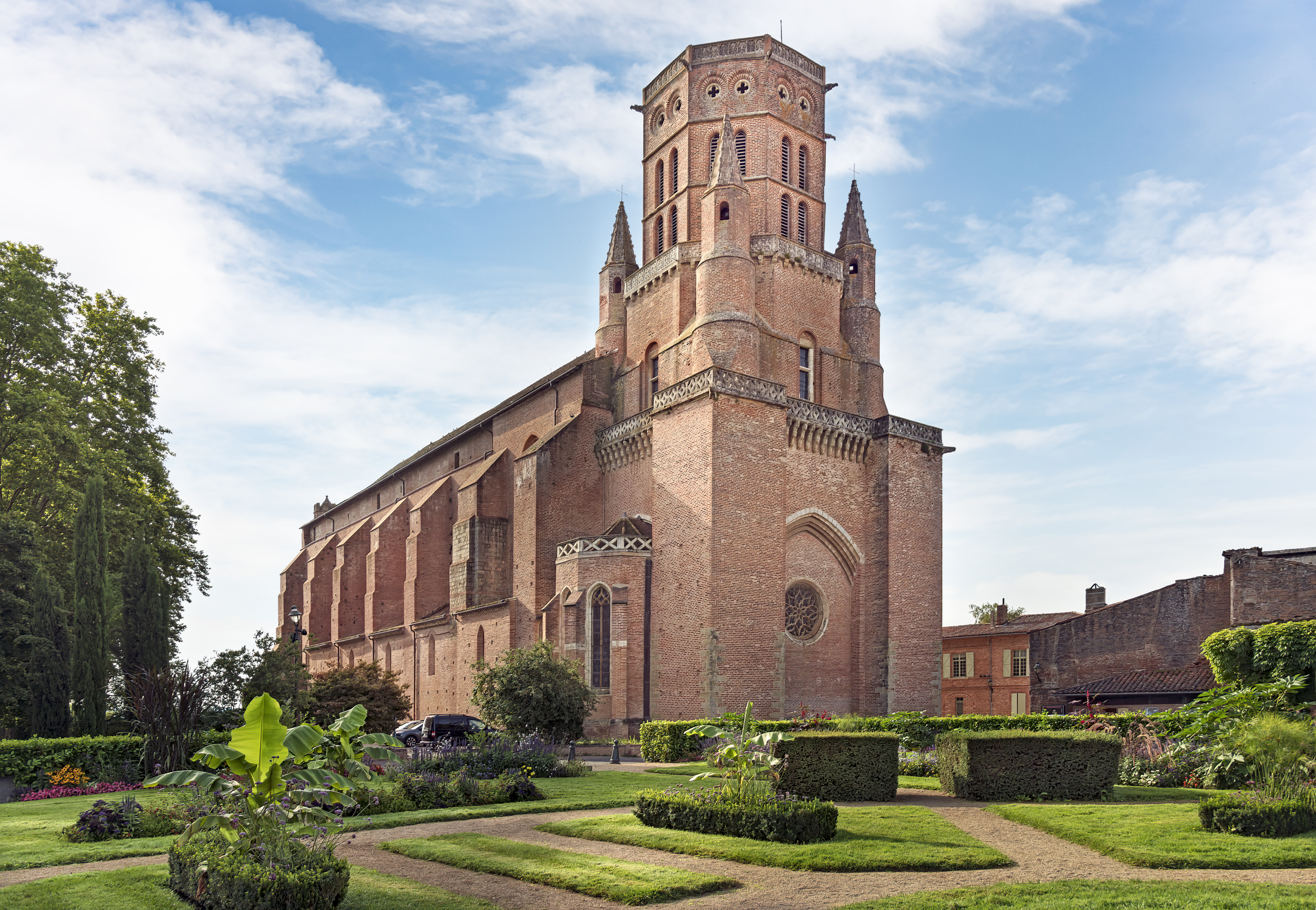
Lavaur Cathedral

- From 1317 until the French Revolution Lavaur was the seat of a bishopric; Lavaur Cathedral, dedicated to Saint Alan, was built for this purpose, dating from the 13th, 14th and 15th centuries, with an octagonal bell-tower. A second, smaller square tower contains a jaquemart (a statue which strikes the hours with a hammer) of the 16th century. In the bishops garden is the statue of Emmanuel, comte de Las Cases, one of the companions of Napoleon at Saint Helena. Historical monument since 1911.
- Church of Saint-François. (XIV c.). Historical monument since 1996.
- Tower of Rounds. (XIII c.) Historical monument since 1971.
- Viaduc de Lavaur. 1884. Engineer Paul Séjourné.
- Pont de Lavaur. Stone masonry road bridge over the Agout. Built between 1773 and 1791. Designed for the Estates of Languedoc by Joseph-Marie de Saget, known as De Saget elder.

== Economy ==
The town carries on distilling and flour-milling and the manufacture of brushes, plaster and wooden shoes.

== Notable residents ==
- Pierre Fabre, founder of Laboratoires Pierre Fabre
- Étienne de Voisins-Lavernière (1813–1898), French deputy and then senator for Tarn

== Miscellaneous ==
There is a subprefecture and a tribunal of first instance (a lower Court of Justice).

== Climate ==
Climate data for Lavaur, Tarn (1991–2020 normals, extremes 1985–present)
| Month | Jan | Feb | Mar | Apr | May | Jun | Jul | Aug | Sep | Oct | Nov | Dec | Year |
|---|---|---|---|---|---|---|---|---|---|---|---|---|---|
| Record high °C (°F) | 19.9 (67.8) | 23.9 (75.0) | 26.8 (80.2) | 30.1 (86.2) | 35.5 (95.9) | 40.4 (104.7) | 39.9 (103.8) | 42.6 (108.7) | 36.9 (98.4) | 35.3 (95.5) | 25.3 (77.5) | 20.7 (69.3) | 42.6 (108.7) |
| Mean daily maximum °C (°F) | 9.7 (49.5) | 11.5 (52.7) | 15.4 (59.7) | 18.3 (64.9) | 22.3 (72.1) | 26.3 (79.3) | 28.8 (83.8) | 29.1 (84.4) | 25.2 (77.4) | 20.2 (68.4) | 13.7 (56.7) | 10.3 (50.5) | 19.2 (66.6) |
| Daily mean °C (°F) | 5.7 (42.3) | 6.6 (43.9) | 9.6 (49.3) | 12.3 (54.1) | 16.2 (61.2) | 19.9 (67.8) | 22.0 (71.6) | 22.1 (71.8) | 18.4 (65.1) | 14.7 (58.5) | 9.4 (48.9) | 6.3 (43.3) | 13.6 (56.5) |
| Mean daily minimum °C (°F) | 1.8 (35.2) | 1.6 (34.9) | 3.8 (38.8) | 6.2 (43.2) | 10.1 (50.2) | 13.6 (56.5) | 15.2 (59.4) | 15.1 (59.2) | 11.7 (53.1) | 9.2 (48.6) | 5.1 (41.2) | 2.4 (36.3) | 8.0 (46.4) |
| Record low °C (°F) | −18.0 (−0.4) | −13.1 (8.4) | −10.3 (13.5) | −3.7 (25.3) | −0.6 (30.9) | 3.5 (38.3) | 7.1 (44.8) | 4.6 (40.3) | 3.5 (38.3) | −2.9 (26.8) | −8.0 (17.6) | −10.5 (13.1) | −18.0 (−0.4) |
| Average precipitation mm (inches) | 53.9 (2.12) | 44.6 (1.76) | 52.2 (2.06) | 72.0 (2.83) | 74.6 (2.94) | 67.5 (2.66) | 43.1 (1.70) | 47.8 (1.88) | 59.5 (2.34) | 64.3 (2.53) | 64.5 (2.54) | 57.8 (2.28) | 701.8 (27.63) |
| Average precipitation days (≥ 1.0 mm) | 10.2 | 9.0 | 8.3 | 9.9 | 9.2 | 7.4 | 5.8 | 5.8 | 6.8 | 8.5 | 10.4 | 9.9 | 101.1 |
Source: Meteociel

== See also ==
- Communes of the Tarn department
