= Lugan, Tarn =

Lugan
- Commune
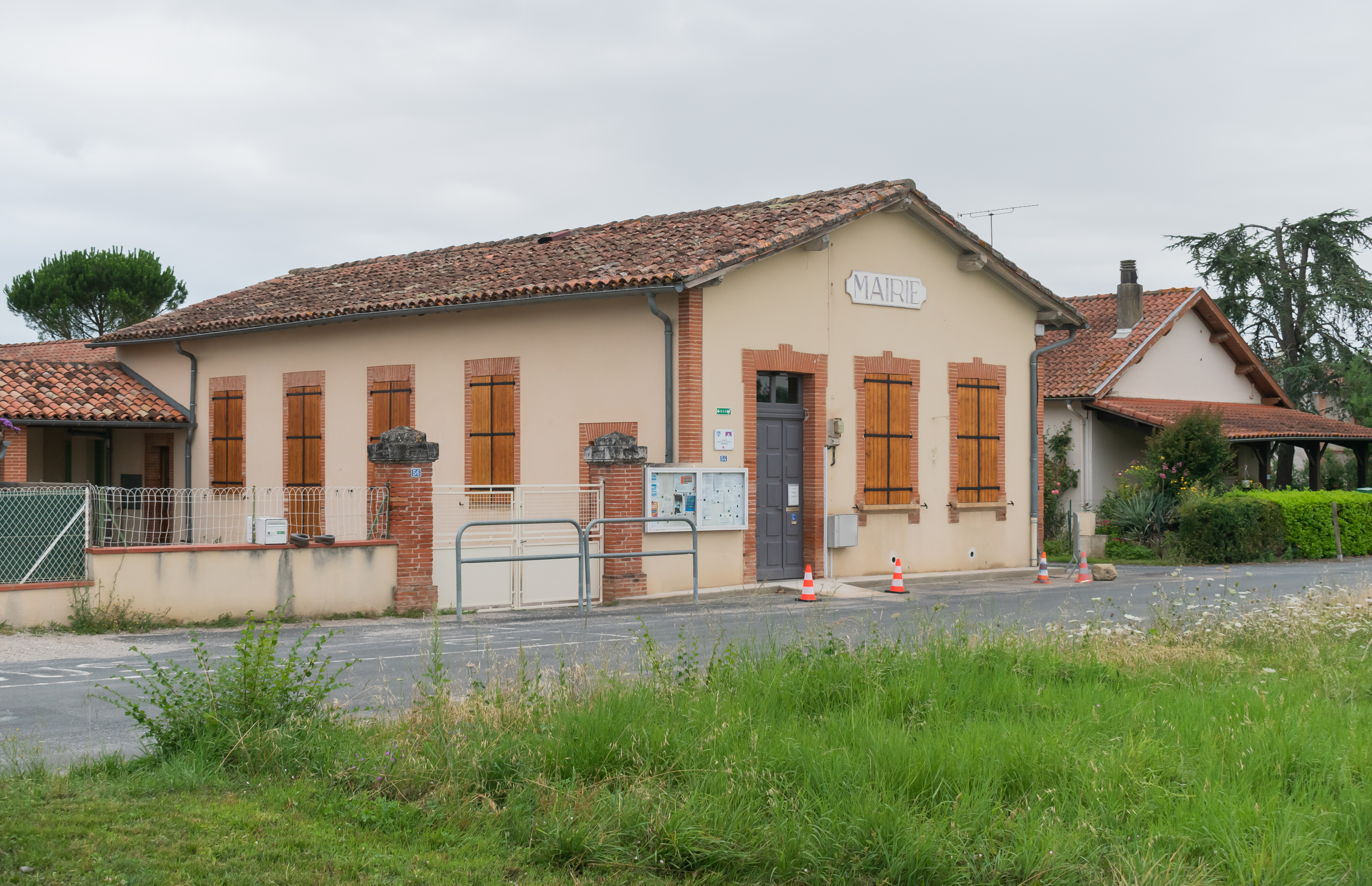
- Town hall of Lugan, Tarn

- Coat of arms
- Location of Lugan
- Location within France Location within Occitanie
- Coordinates: 43°43′56″N 1°43′06″E
- Country: France
- Region: Occitania
- Department: Tarn
- Arrondissement: Castres
- Canton: Les Portes du Tarn
- Intercommunality: CC Tarn-Agout

Government
  - Mayor (2020–2026): Xavier Crémoux
- Area^{1}: 10.13 km^{2} (3.91 sq mi)
- Elevation: 160 m (520 ft)
- Highest elevation: 231 m (758 ft)
- Lowest elevation: 129 m (423 ft)
- Population (2023): 419
  - Density: 41.4/km^{2} (107/sq mi)
- Time zone: UTC+01:00 (CET)
  - Summer (DST): UTC+02:00 (CEST)
- INSEE/Postal code: 81150 /81500
- ^{1} French Land Register data, which excludes lakes, ponds, glaciers > 1 km^{2} (0.386 sq mi or 247 acres) and river estuaries.

Lugan (Occitan: Lugarn, meaning the northern star) is a commune in the Tarn department in southern France.

== See also ==
- Communes of the Tarn department
