= Laprade =

Laprade or La Prade may refer to:

== Places ==
- Laprade, Aude, France
- Laprade, Charente, France
- LaPrade Valley, Columbus Hills, Antarctica

== People ==
- Albert Laprade (1883–1978), French architect
- Edgar Laprade (1919–2014), Canadian professional ice hockey centre
- Émile Pinet-Laprade (1822–1869), governor of Senegal
- Erik La Prade (fl. 1978–2018), U.S. journalist
- Robert F. LaPrade (fl. 1981–2013), U.S. surgeon
- Robert M. La Prade (born 1916), U.S. soldier
- Serge Laprade (born 1941), French Canadian singer and a radio and television host
- Victor de Laprade (1812–1883), French poet and critic

=== Fictional people ===
Teraï Laprade, geologist from three science fiction stories by French writer Francis Carsac

== Other uses ==
- USS La Prade, a U.S. World War II destroyer

== See also ==
- Prade, a settlement in the Littoral region of Slovenia
- Prades (disambiguation)
- Saint-Germain-Laprade, Haute-Loire, France
