= Brousse =

Brousse is the name or part of the name of the following communes in France:

- Brousse, Creuse, in the Creuse department
- Brousse (New Caledonia), a term referring to the rural areas outside Nouméa
- Brousse, Puy-de-Dôme, in the Puy-de-Dôme department
- Brousse, Tarn, in the Tarn department
- Brousse-le-Château, in the Aveyron department
- La Brousse, in the Charente-Maritime department

== See also ==
- Labrousse, a commune in France
- Brousses (disambiguation)
- Brousse, a kind of cheese
- Bursa, a city in Turkey known as Brousse in French
