= Prades =

Prades may refer to:

== Places ==
France

- Prades, Ardèche, in the Ardèche département, France
- Prades, Ariège, in the Ariège département, France
- Prades, Haute-Loire, in the Haute-Loire département, France
- Prades, Pyrénées-Orientales (Prada de Conflent in Catalan), in the Pyrénées-Orientales département, France
- Prades, Tarn, in the Tarn département, France
- Prades, in the commune of Sainte-Enimie, in the Lozère département, France
- Prades-d'Aubrac, in the Aveyron département, France
- Prades-le-Lez, in the Hérault département, France
- Prades-Salars, in the Aveyron département, France
- Prades-sur-Vernazobre, in the Hérault département, France
- Saint-Cirgues-de-Prades, in the Ardèche département, France
- Arrondissement of Prades, in the Pyrénées-Orientales département, France
- Canton of Prades, in the Pyrénées-Orientales département, France

Spain

- Prades, Baix Camp, a municipality in the Baix Camp comarca, in the province of Tarragona, Catalonia, Spain
- Vilanova de Prades, a municipality in the province of Tarragona, Catalonia, Spain
- Prades Mountains, near Prades, Spain

== People ==
- Eduard Pons Prades or Floreado Barsino (1920–2007), Spanish writer and historian
- Jean-Martin de Prades (c. 1720–1782), French theologian
- Josep Prades i Gallent (1689–1757), Spanish organist and composer
- Laurent Prades (born 1968), French tennis player
- Margaret of Prades (1388/95 – 1429), queen consort of King Martin I of Aragon
- Núria Pradas (born 1954), Spanish philologist and writer of children's and youth literature
- Prades Tavernier (late thirteenth–early fourteenth century), French weaver and Cathar Perfect

== See also ==
- Prade, Slovenia
- Laprade (disambiguation)
