= Roumégoux =

Roumégoux may refer to the following places in France:

- Roumégoux, Cantal, a commune in the Cantal department
- Roumégoux, Tarn, a commune in the Tarn department
