= Viterbe =

Viterbe may refer to:

- Viterbo, a comune (township) in the Lazio region of central Italy,
- Viterbe, a commune of the Tarn département, in France
