= Saint-Antonin =

Saint-Antonin may refer to the following places:

== In France ==
- Saint-Antonin, Alpes-Maritimes, in the Alpes-Maritimes département
- Saint-Antonin, Gers, in the Gers département
- Saint-Antonin-de-Lacalm, in the Tarn département
- Saint-Antonin-de-Sommaire, in the Eure département
- Saint-Antonin-du-Var, in the Var département
- Saint-Antonin-Noble-Val, in the Tarn-et-Garonne département
- Saint-Antonin-sur-Bayon, in the Bouches-du-Rhône département

== In Canada ==
- Saint-Antonin, Québec
