= Cuq =

Cuq or CUQ may refer to:

== Places ==
- Coen Airport, Queensland, Australia, by IATA code
- Cuq, Lot-et-Garonne, commune in the Lot-et-Garonne department, France
- Cuq, Tarn, commune in the Tarn department, France
- Cuq-Toulza, commune in the Tarn department, France

== People with the surname ==
- Henri Cuq (1942–2010), French politician
- Pierre Mondy (1925–2012), French actor, born Pierre Cuq

== Sports ==
- CUQ or Círculo Universitario de Quilmes, Argentine rugby union club based in Quilmes, Buenos Aires

== Languages ==
- Cun language (an ISO 639-3 language code: cuq)
