= Saint-Genest-de-Contest =

- Commune
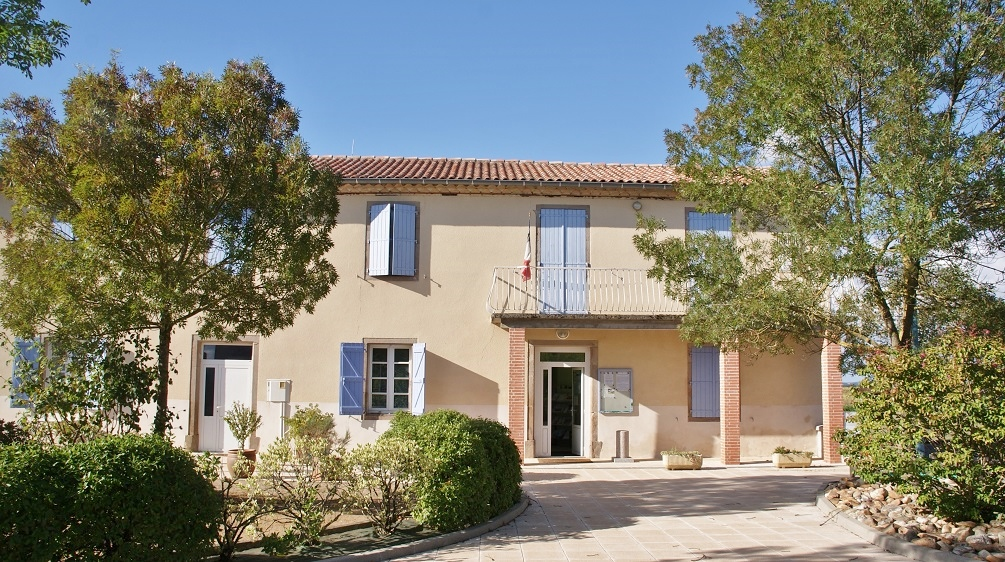
- Town hall

- Coat of arms
- Location of Saint-Genest-de-Contest
- Location within France Location within Occitanie
- Coordinates: 43°45′38″N 2°08′49″E
- Country: France
- Region: Occitania
- Department: Tarn
- Arrondissement: Castres
- Canton: Plaine de l'Agoût
- Intercommunality: Lautrécois-Pays d'Agout

Government
  - Mayor (2020–2026): Jean-Jacques Ayral
- Area^{1}: 13.71 km^{2} (5.29 sq mi)
- Elevation: 281 m (922 ft)
- Highest elevation: 321 m (1,053 ft)
- Lowest elevation: 177 m (581 ft)
- Population (2023): 282
  - Density: 20.6/km^{2} (53.3/sq mi)
- Time zone: UTC+01:00 (CET)
  - Summer (DST): UTC+02:00 (CEST)
- INSEE/Postal code: 81250 /81440
- ^{1} French Land Register data, which excludes lakes, ponds, glaciers > 1 km^{2} (0.386 sq mi or 247 acres) and river estuaries.

Saint-Genest-de-Contest (Languedocien: Sent Guinièis) is a commune in the Tarn department in southern France.

== Geography ==
The Dadou forms the commune's northern border.

== See also ==
- Communes of the Tarn department
