= Montpinier =

- Commune
- Coat of arms
- Location of Montpinier
- Location within France Location within Occitanie
- Coordinates: 43°40′43″N 2°12′11″E
- Country: France
- Region: Occitania
- Department: Tarn
- Arrondissement: Castres
- Canton: Plaine de l'Agoût

Government
  - Mayor (2020–2026): Georges Boutié
- Area^{1}: 7.6 km^{2} (2.9 sq mi)
- Elevation: 284 m (932 ft)
- Highest elevation: 301 m (988 ft)
- Lowest elevation: 193 m (633 ft)
- Population (2023): 182
  - Density: 24/km^{2} (62/sq mi)
- Time zone: UTC+01:00 (CET)
  - Summer (DST): UTC+02:00 (CEST)
- INSEE/Postal code: 81181 /81440
- ^{1} French Land Register data, which excludes lakes, ponds, glaciers > 1 km^{2} (0.386 sq mi or 247 acres) and river estuaries.

Montpinier (French pronunciation: [mɔ̃pinje]; Occitan: Montpinhièr) is a commune in the Tarn department in southern France.

== See also ==
- Communes of the Tarn department
