= Peyregoux =

- Commune
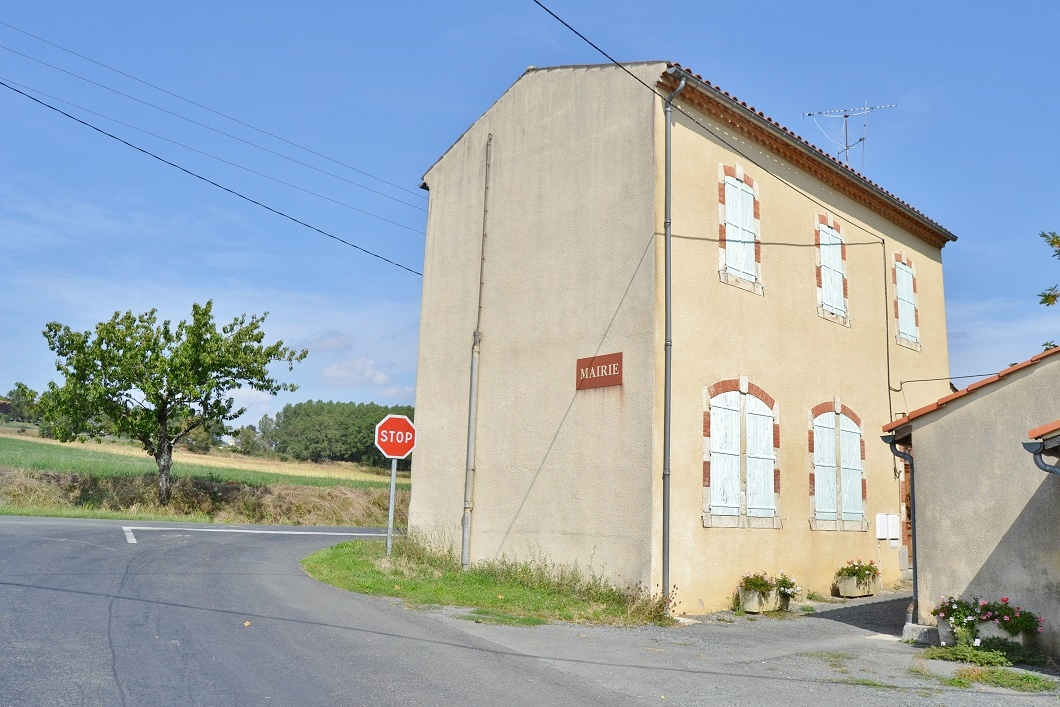
- Peyregoux Town hall

- Coat of arms
- Location of Peyregoux
- Location within France Location within Occitanie
- Coordinates: 43°42′12″N 2°12′16″E
- Country: France
- Region: Occitania
- Department: Tarn
- Arrondissement: Castres
- Canton: Plaine de l'Agoût

Government
  - Mayor (2020–2026): Christian Mazars
- Area^{1}: 4.5 km^{2} (1.7 sq mi)
- Elevation: 220 m (720 ft)
- Highest elevation: 289 m (948 ft)
- Lowest elevation: 199 m (653 ft)
- Population (2023): 86
  - Density: 19/km^{2} (49/sq mi)
- Time zone: UTC+01:00 (CET)
  - Summer (DST): UTC+02:00 (CEST)
- INSEE/Postal code: 81207 /81440
- ^{1} French Land Register data, which excludes lakes, ponds, glaciers > 1 km^{2} (0.386 sq mi or 247 acres) and river estuaries.

Peyregoux is a commune in the Tarn department in southern France.

== See also ==
- Communes of the Tarn department
