= Puycalvel =

- Commune
- Coat of arms
- Location of Puycalvel
- Location within France Location within Occitanie
- Coordinates: 43°40′51″N 2°05′32″E
- Country: France
- Region: Occitania
- Department: Tarn
- Arrondissement: Castres
- Canton: Plaine de l'Agoût
- Intercommunality: Lautrécois-Pays d'Agout

Government
  - Mayor (2020–2026): Michel Colombier
- Area^{1}: 12.27 km^{2} (4.74 sq mi)
- Elevation: 225 m (738 ft)
- Highest elevation: 341 m (1,119 ft)
- Lowest elevation: 182 m (597 ft)
- Population (2023): 217
  - Density: 17.7/km^{2} (45.8/sq mi)
- Time zone: UTC+01:00 (CET)
  - Summer (DST): UTC+02:00 (CEST)
- INSEE/Postal code: 81216 /81440
- ^{1} French Land Register data, which excludes lakes, ponds, glaciers > 1 km^{2} (0.386 sq mi or 247 acres) and river estuaries.

Puycalvel (French pronunciation: [pɥikalvɛl]; Occitan: Puègcalvèl) is a commune in the Tarn department in southern France.

== See also ==
- Communes of the Tarn department
