= Dadou =

River in southern France

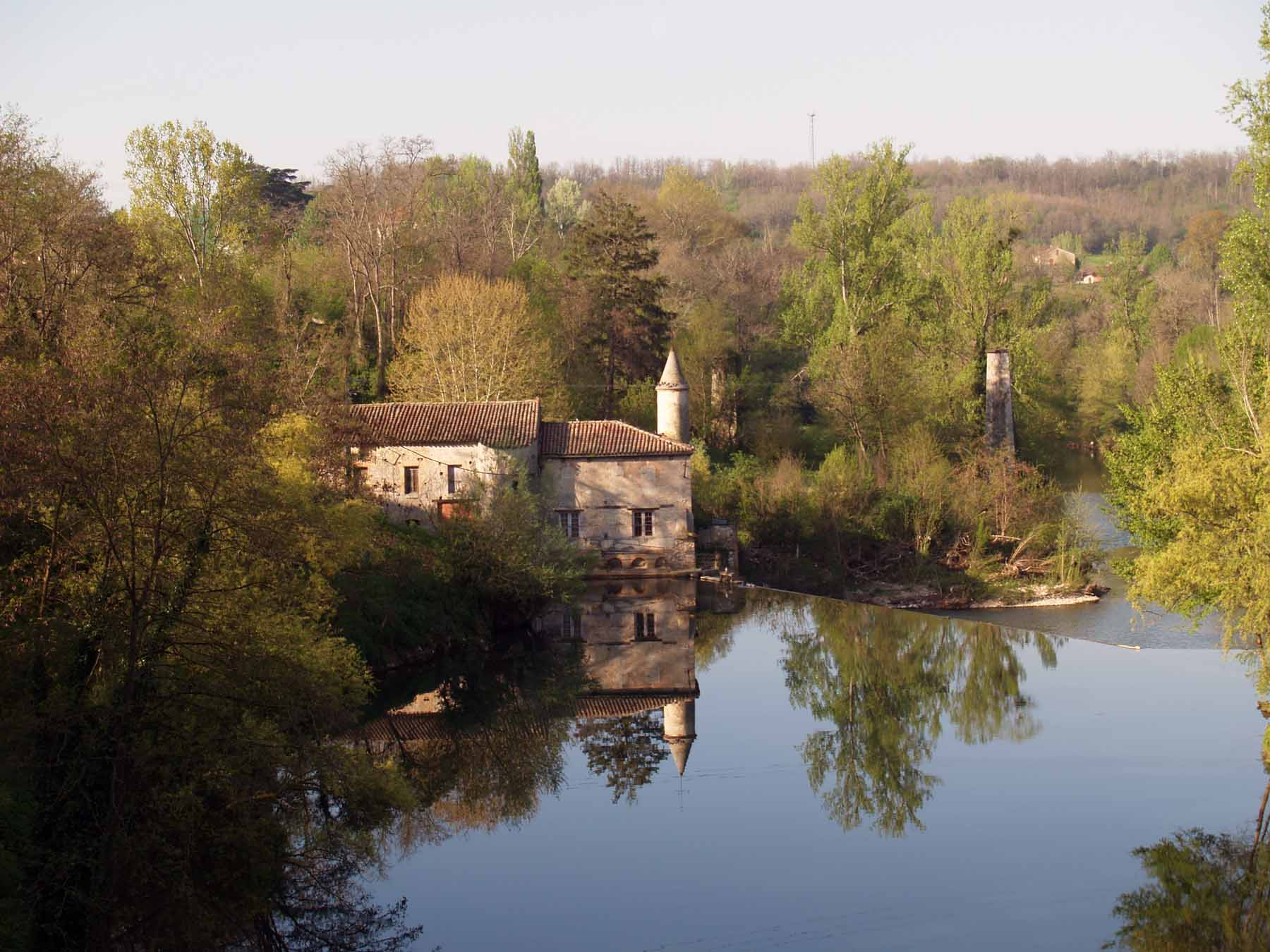
- The Dadou at Briatexte

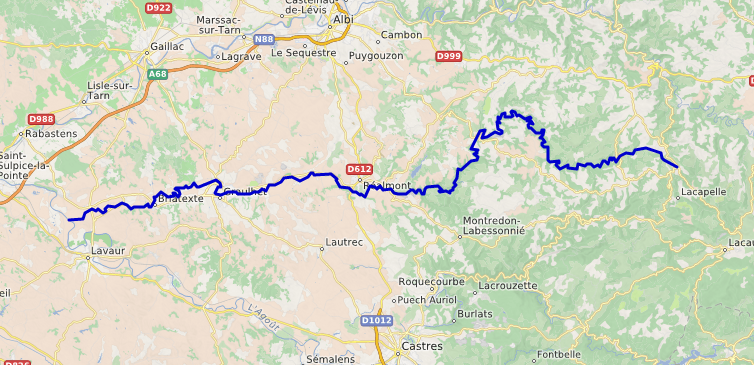

Location
- Country: France

Physical characteristics
- Source
  - location: Saint-Salvi-de-Carcavès
  - coordinates: 43°47′19″N 02°37′32″E
  - elevation: 860 m (2,820 ft)
- Mouth
  - location: Agout
  - coordinates: 43°44′11″N 01°47′24″E
  - elevation: 110 m (360 ft)
- Length: 115.8 km (72.0 mi)
- Basin size: 858 km^{2} (331 sq mi)
- Discharge
  - average: 12 m^{3}/s (420 cu ft/s)

Basin features
- Progression: Agout→ Tarn→ Garonne→ Gironde estuary→ Atlantic Ocean

The Dadou (French: le Dadou) is a 115.8 km (72.0 mi) long river in the Tarn department in southern France. Its source is near Saint-Salvi-de-Carcavès. It flows generally west. It is a right tributary of the Agout, into which it flows near Ambres.

== Communes along its course ==
The Dadou flows west, crossing the Tarn department, through the following communes, ordered from source to mouth:

- Saint-Salvi-de-Carcavès
- Le Masnau-Massuguiès
- Lacaze
- Paulinet
- Rayssac
- Mont-Roc
- Teillet
- Le Travet
- Arifat
- Saint-Antonin-de-Lacalm
- Montredon-Labessonnié
- Saint-Lieux-Lafenasse
- Vénès
- Réalmont
- Saint-Genest-de-Contest
- Lombers
- Laboutarie
- Montdragon
- Saint-Julien-du-Puy
- Graulhet
- Briatexte
- Saint-Gauzens
- Puybegon
- Giroussens
- Ambres
