= Ronel =

- Part of Terre-de-Bancalié
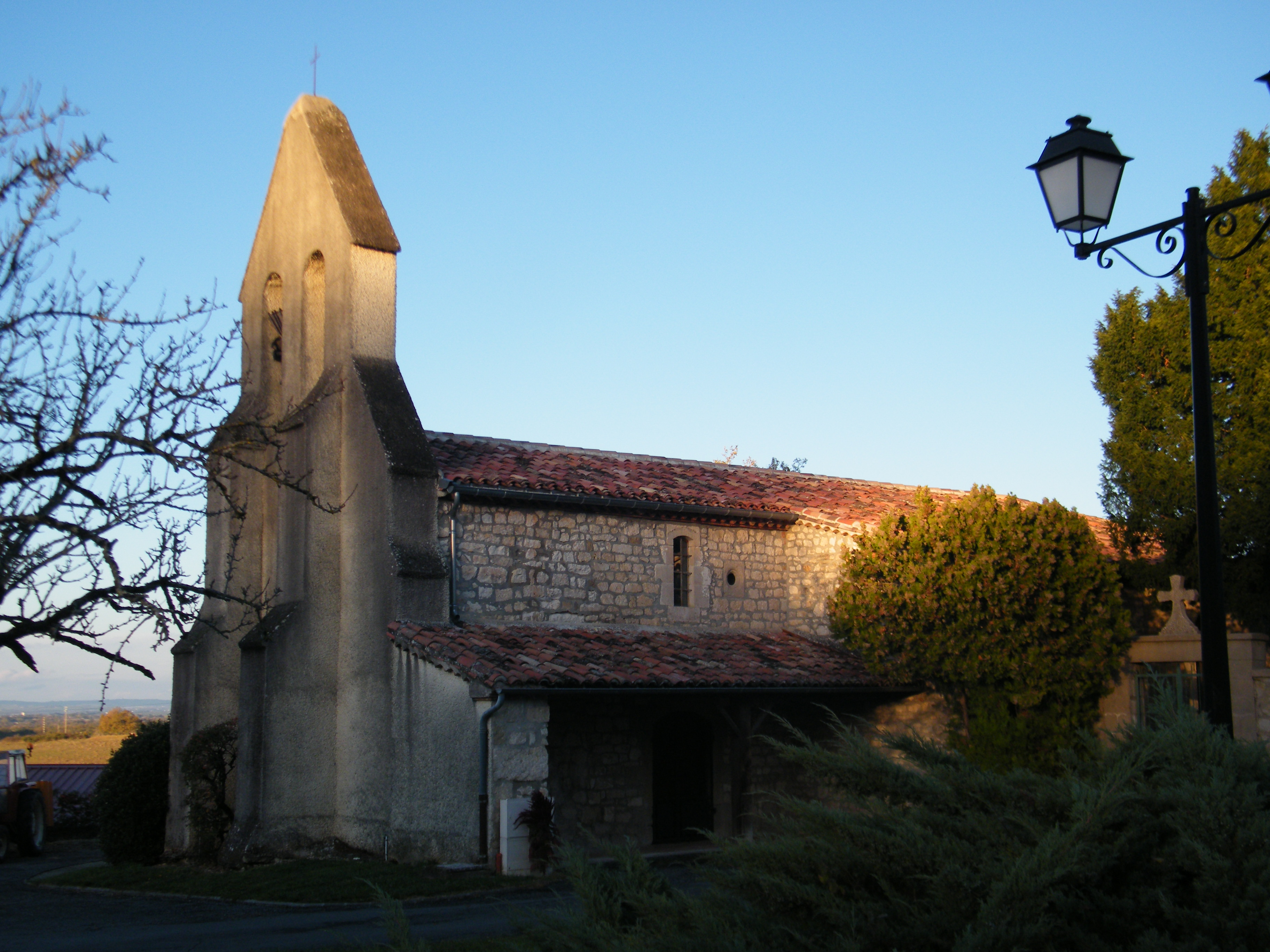
- The church in Ronel
- Location of Ronel
- Location within France Location within Occitanie
- Coordinates: 43°48′55″N 2°13′28″E
- Country: France
- Region: Occitania
- Department: Tarn
- Arrondissement: Albi
- Canton: Le Haut Dadou
- Commune: Terre-de-Bancalié
- Area^{1}: 9.89 km^{2} (3.82 sq mi)
- Elevation: 350 m (1,150 ft)
- Highest elevation: 370 m (1,210 ft)
- Lowest elevation: 235 m (771 ft)
- Population (2022): 367
  - Density: 37.1/km^{2} (96.1/sq mi)
- Time zone: UTC+01:00 (CET)
  - Summer (DST): UTC+02:00 (CEST)
- Postal code: 81120
- ^{1} French Land Register data, which excludes lakes, ponds, glaciers > 1 km^{2} (0.386 sq mi or 247 acres) and river estuaries.

Ronel (French pronunciation: [ʁɔnɛl]; Languedocien: Ronèl) is a former commune in the Tarn department and Occitanie region of southern France. On 1 January 2019, it was merged into the new commune Terre-de-Bancalié.

== See also ==
- Communes of the Tarn department
