= Teyssode =

- Commune
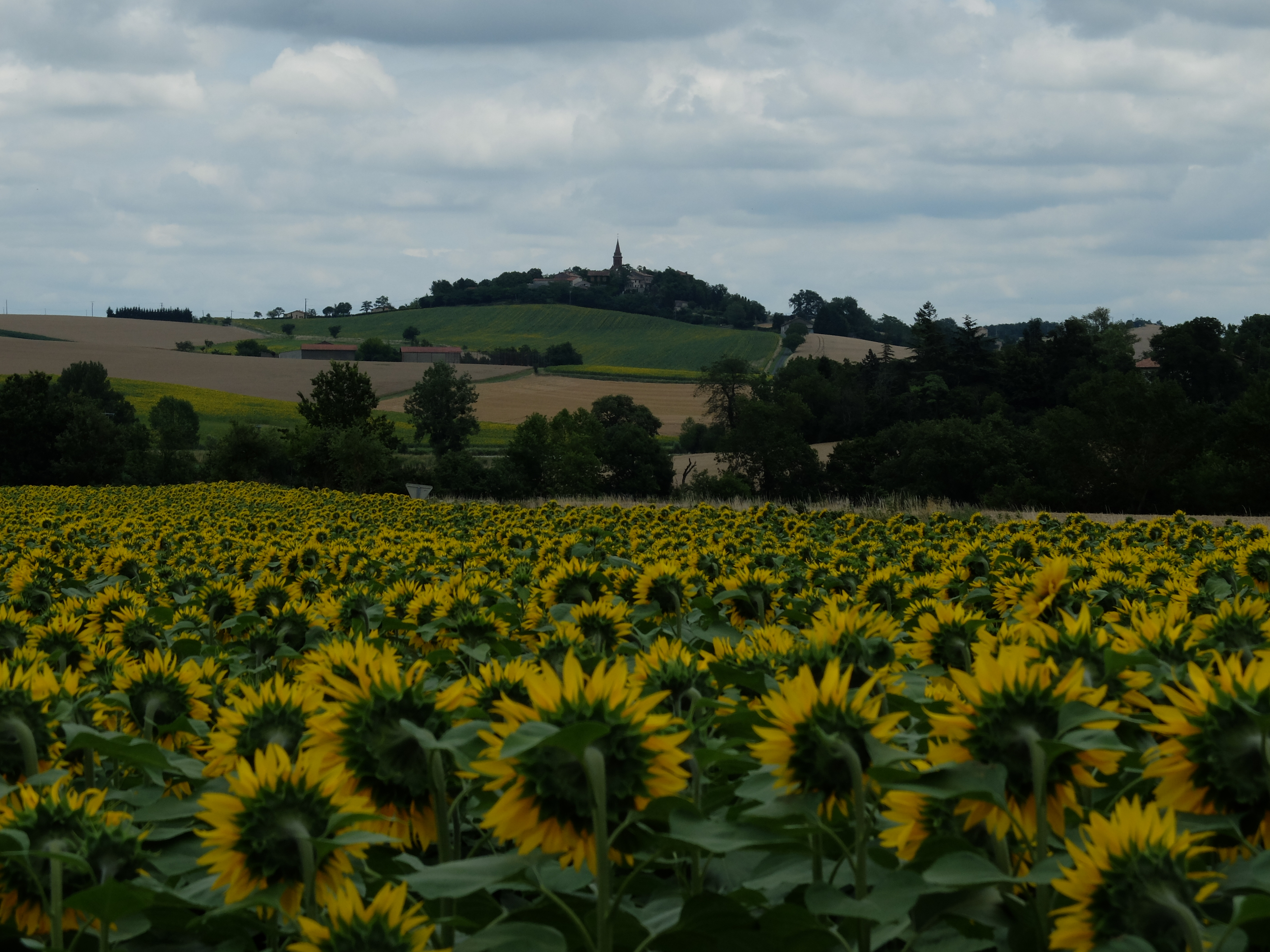
- Teyssode and its surroundings

- Coat of arms
- Location of Teyssode
- Location within France Location within Occitanie
- Coordinates: 43°39′02″N 1°56′08″E
- Country: France
- Region: Occitania
- Department: Tarn
- Arrondissement: Castres
- Canton: Plaine de l'Agoût
- Intercommunality: Lautrécois-Pays d'Agout

Government
  - Mayor (2020–2026): Francis Moulet
- Area^{1}: 22.88 km^{2} (8.83 sq mi)
- Elevation: 288 m (945 ft)
- Highest elevation: 327 m (1,073 ft)
- Lowest elevation: 127 m (417 ft)
- Population (2023): 382
  - Density: 16.7/km^{2} (43.2/sq mi)
- Time zone: UTC+01:00 (CET)
  - Summer (DST): UTC+02:00 (CEST)
- INSEE/Postal code: 81299 /81220
- ^{1} French Land Register data, which excludes lakes, ponds, glaciers > 1 km^{2} (0.386 sq mi or 247 acres) and river estuaries.

Teyssode (French pronunciation: [tɛsɔd]; Languedocien: Teissòde) is a commune in the Tarn department in southern France.

== Geography ==
=== Localisation ===
Teyssode is located south-east of Lavaur, the main town nearby.

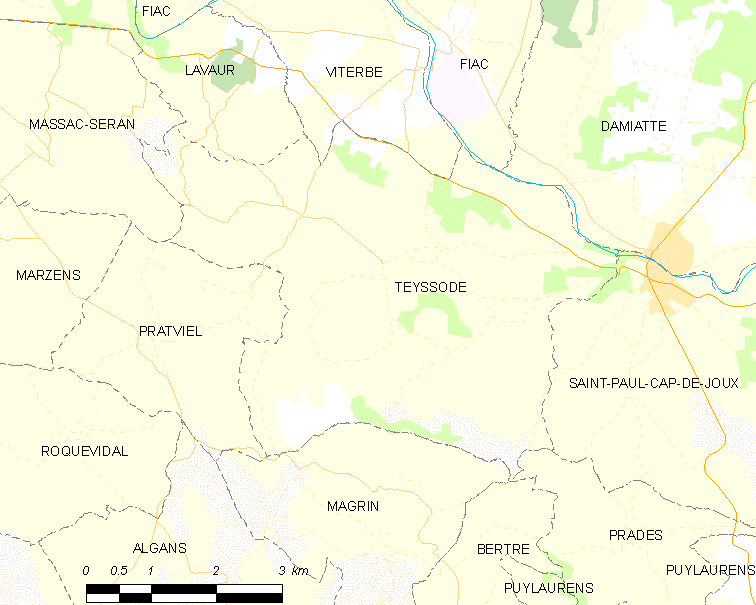
Map of Teyssode

== Toponymy ==
The name of Teyssode is of gallo-romance origin, from the word taxo meaning badger.

== History ==
Teyssode is located on a former Roman oppidum.

In 1824, Teyssode absorbed the neighbouring commune of Saint-Germier.

== See also ==
- Communes of the Tarn department
