= Terre-Clapier =

- Part of Terre-de-Bancalié
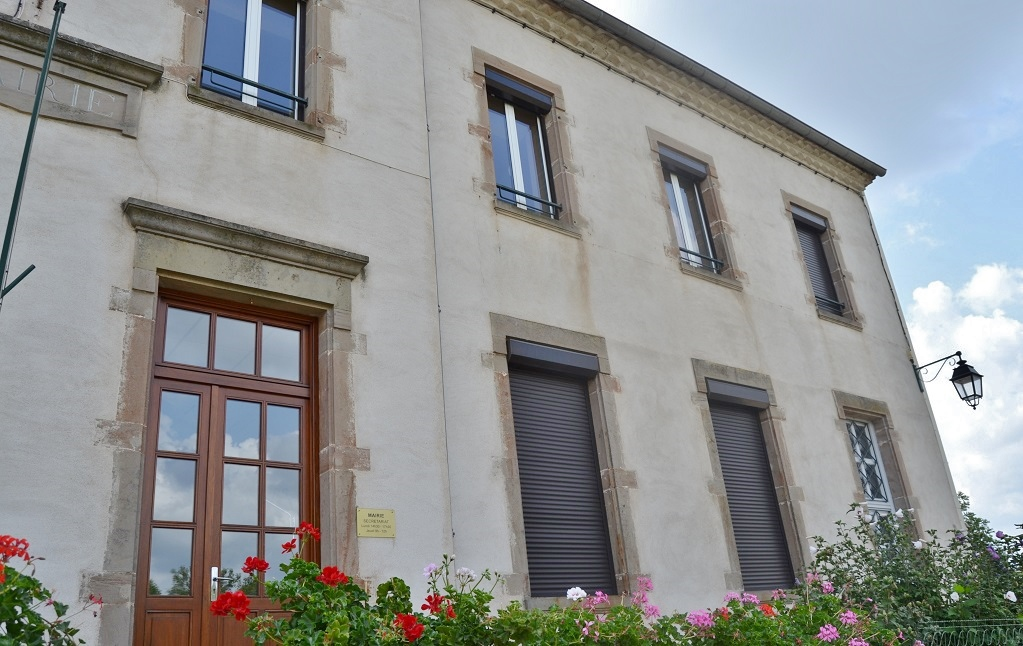
- Terre-Clapier Town hall
- Location of Terre-Clapier
- Location within France Location within Occitanie
- Coordinates: 43°51′20″N 2°18′03″E
- Country: France
- Region: Occitania
- Department: Tarn
- Arrondissement: Albi
- Canton: Le Haut Dadou
- Commune: Terre-de-Bancalié
- Area^{1}: 12.1 km^{2} (4.7 sq mi)
- Elevation: 347 m (1,138 ft)
- Highest elevation: 457 m (1,499 ft)
- Lowest elevation: 271 m (889 ft)
- Population (2022): 252
  - Density: 20.8/km^{2} (53.9/sq mi)
- Time zone: UTC+01:00 (CET)
  - Summer (DST): UTC+02:00 (CEST)
- Postal code: 81120
- ^{1} French Land Register data, which excludes lakes, ponds, glaciers > 1 km^{2} (0.386 sq mi or 247 acres) and river estuaries.

Terre-Clapier (French pronunciation: [tɛʁ klapje]; Languedocien: Tèrra Clapièr) is a former commune in the Tarn department in southern France. On 1 January 2019, it was merged into the new commune Terre-de-Bancalié.

== See also ==
- Communes of the Tarn department
