= Le Travet =

- Part of Terre-de-Bancalié
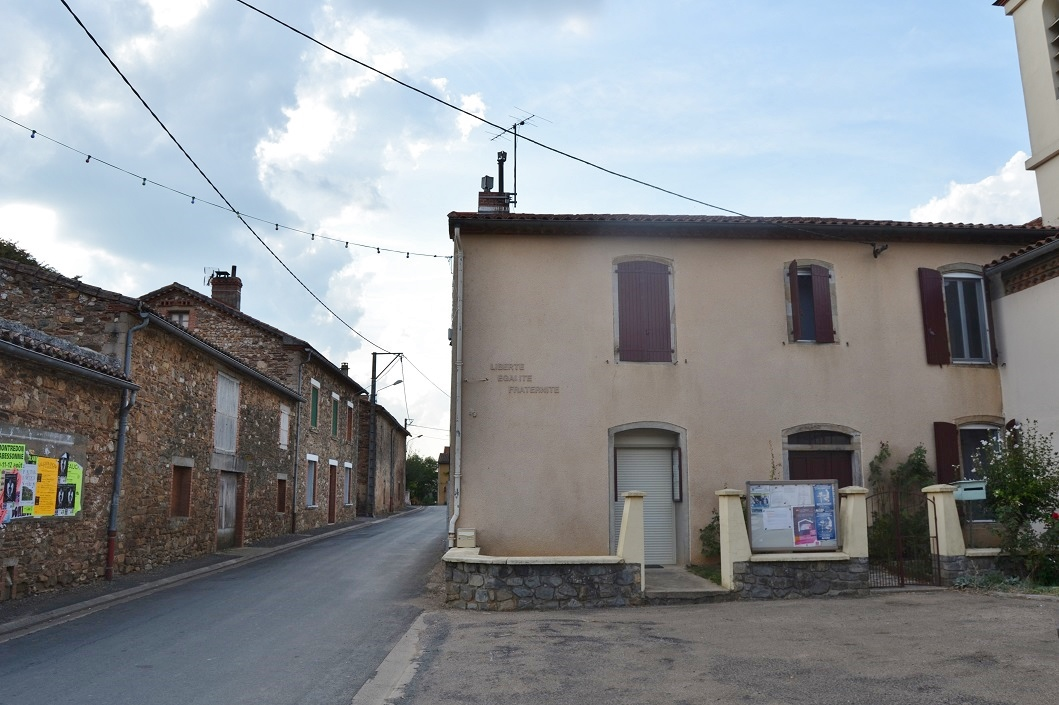
- Le Travet Town hall
- Location of Le Travet
- Location within France Location within Occitanie
- Coordinates: 43°48′31″N 2°19′53″E
- Country: France
- Region: Occitania
- Department: Tarn
- Arrondissement: Albi
- Canton: Le Haut Dadou
- Commune: Terre-de-Bancalié
- Area^{1}: 8.44 km^{2} (3.26 sq mi)
- Elevation: 470 m (1,540 ft)
- Highest elevation: 480 m (1,570 ft)
- Lowest elevation: 304 m (997 ft)
- Population (2022): 132
  - Density: 15.6/km^{2} (40.5/sq mi)
- Time zone: UTC+01:00 (CET)
  - Summer (DST): UTC+02:00 (CEST)
- Postal code: 81120
- ^{1} French Land Register data, which excludes lakes, ponds, glaciers > 1 km^{2} (0.386 sq mi or 247 acres) and river estuaries.

Le Travet (French pronunciation: [lə tʁavɛ]; Languedocien: Lo Travet) is a former commune in the Tarn department in southern France. On 1 January 2019, it was merged into the new commune Terre-de-Bancalié.

== Geography ==
The commune is traversed by the river Dadou.

== See also ==
- Communes of the Tarn department
