= Laboulbène =

- Commune
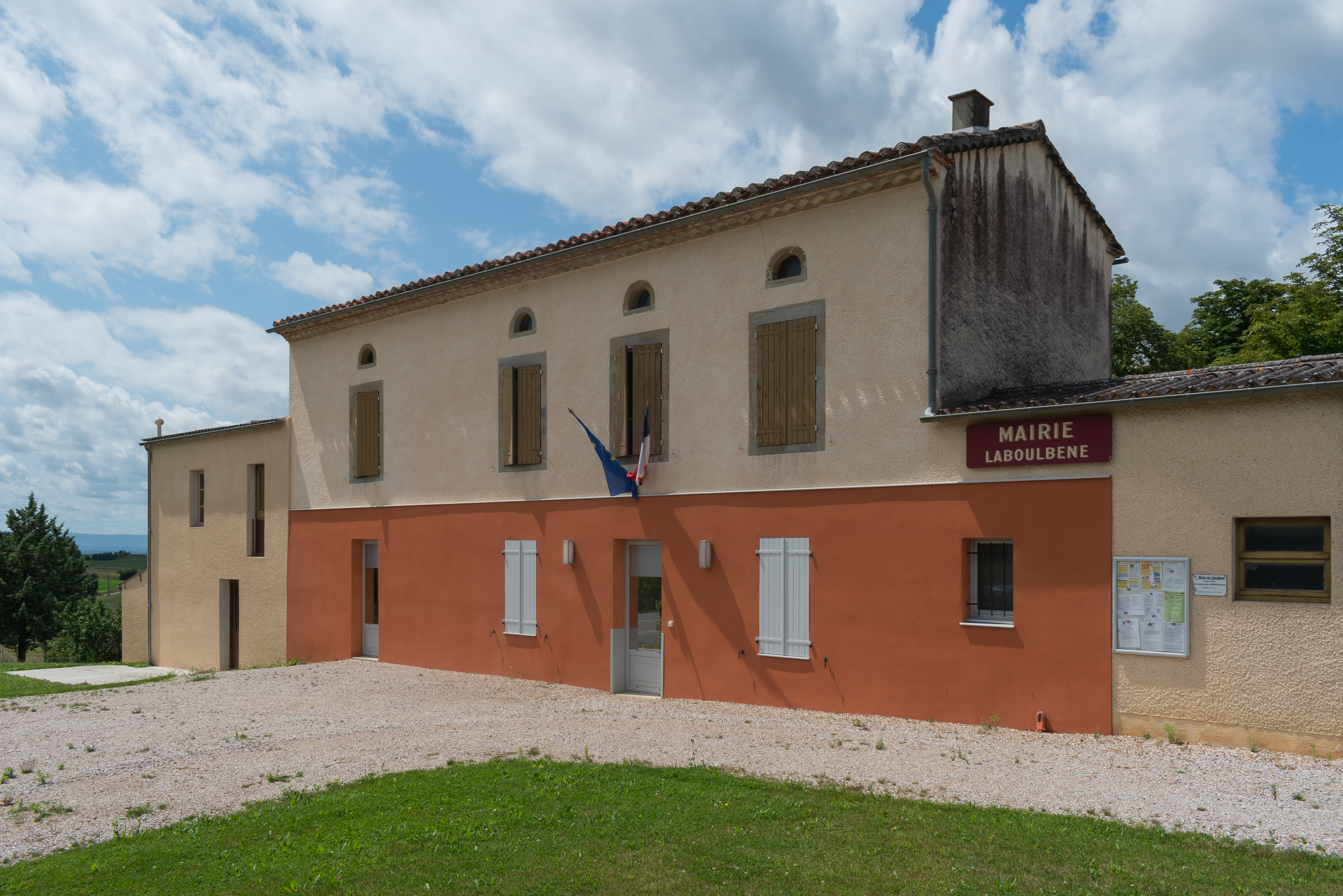
- Town hall of Laboulbene
- Location of Laboulbène
- Location within France Location within Occitanie
- Coordinates: 43°40′40″N 2°12′19″E
- Country: France
- Region: Occitania
- Department: Tarn
- Arrondissement: Castres
- Canton: Plaine de l'Agoût

Government
  - Mayor (2020–2026): Didier Viala
- Area^{1}: 4.65 km^{2} (1.80 sq mi)
- Elevation: 280 m (920 ft)
- Highest elevation: 292 m (958 ft)
- Lowest elevation: 214 m (702 ft)
- Population (2023): 172
  - Density: 37.0/km^{2} (95.8/sq mi)
- Time zone: UTC+01:00 (CET)
  - Summer (DST): UTC+02:00 (CEST)
- INSEE/Postal code: 81118 /81100
- ^{1} French Land Register data, which excludes lakes, ponds, glaciers > 1 km^{2} (0.386 sq mi or 247 acres) and river estuaries.

Laboulbène (French pronunciation: [labulbɛn]; Occitan: La Bolbena) is a commune in the Tarn department in southern France.

== See also ==
- Communes of the Tarn department
