= Saint-Salvi-de-Carcavès =

- Commune
- Coat of arms
- Location of Saint-Salvi-de-Carcavès
- Location within France Location within Occitanie
- Coordinates: 43°48′24″N 2°35′49″E
- Country: France
- Region: Occitania
- Department: Tarn
- Arrondissement: Castres
- Canton: Les Hautes Terres d'Oc
- Intercommunality: CC du Haut-Languedoc

Government
  - Mayor (2025–2026): Francis Remiot
- Area^{1}: 10.96 km^{2} (4.23 sq mi)
- Highest elevation: 931 m (3,054 ft)
- Lowest elevation: 594 m (1,949 ft)
- Population (2023): 84
  - Density: 7.7/km^{2} (20/sq mi)
- Time zone: UTC+01:00 (CET)
  - Summer (DST): UTC+02:00 (CEST)
- INSEE/Postal code: 81268 /81530
- ^{1} French Land Register data, which excludes lakes, ponds, glaciers > 1 km^{2} (0.386 sq mi or 247 acres) and river estuaries.

Saint-Salvi-de-Carcavès (French pronunciation: [sɛ̃ salvi də kaʁkavɛs]; Occitan: Sent Salvi de Carcavés) is a commune in the Tarn department in southern France.

== Geography ==
The river Dadou has its source in the commune.

== See also ==
- Communes of the Tarn department
