= Montredon-Labessonnié =

- Commune
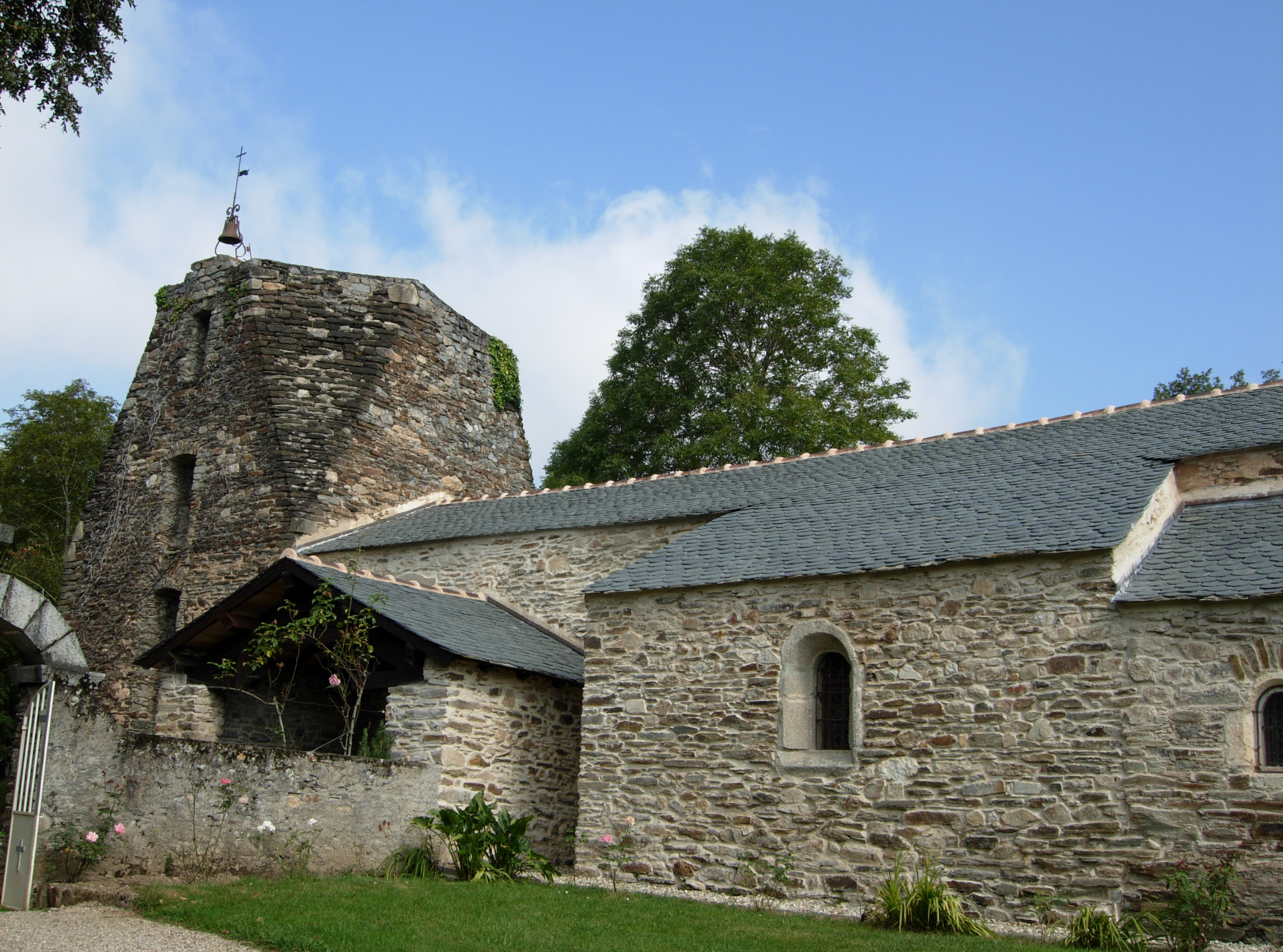
- The church in Montredon-Labessonié

- Coat of arms
- Location of Montredon-Labessonnié
- Location within France Location within Occitanie
- Coordinates: 43°43′16″N 2°19′38″E
- Country: France
- Region: Occitania
- Department: Tarn
- Arrondissement: Castres
- Canton: Le Haut Dadou

Government
  - Mayor (2020–2026): Jean-Paul Chamayou
- Area^{1}: 110.88 km^{2} (42.81 sq mi)
- Elevation: 570 m (1,870 ft)
- Highest elevation: 644 m (2,113 ft)
- Lowest elevation: 196 m (643 ft)
- Population (2023): 2,076
  - Density: 18.72/km^{2} (48.49/sq mi)
- Time zone: UTC+01:00 (CET)
  - Summer (DST): UTC+02:00 (CEST)
- INSEE/Postal code: 81182 /81360
- ^{1} French Land Register data, which excludes lakes, ponds, glaciers > 1 km^{2} (0.386 sq mi or 247 acres) and river estuaries.

Montredon-Labessonnie (French pronunciation: [mɔ̃tʁədɔ̃ labɛsɔnje]; Occitan: La Bessoniá de Montredond) is a commune in the Tarn department in southern France.

The commune has several shops, a planetarium, a cinema, a tourist information centre, a hotel, cafe-bars among other venues.

== Geography ==
The commune is traversed by the river Dadou.

== Population ==
Historical population
Year	Pop.	±% p.a.
1968	2,327	—
1975	2,058	−1.74%
1982	2,167	+0.74%
1990	2,111	−0.33%
1999	2,030	−0.43%
2007	2,058	+0.17%
2012	2,084	+0.25%
2017	2,004	−0.78%
2023	2,076	+0.59%
Source: INSEE

== See also ==
- Communes of the Tarn department
