= Terre-de-Bancalié =

- Commune
- Location of Terre-de-Bancalié
- Location within France Location within Occitanie
- Coordinates: 43°48′14″N 2°15′43″E
- Country: France
- Region: Occitania
- Department: Tarn
- Arrondissement: Albi
- Canton: Le Haut Dadou
- Intercommunality: Centre Tarn
- Area^{1}: 84.14 km^{2} (32.49 sq mi)
- Highest elevation: 529 m (1,736 ft)
- Lowest elevation: 230 m (750 ft)
- Population (2023): 1,725
  - Density: 20.50/km^{2} (53.10/sq mi)
- Time zone: UTC+01:00 (CET)
  - Summer (DST): UTC+02:00 (CEST)
- INSEE/Postal code: 81233 /81120
- ^{1} French Land Register data, which excludes lakes, ponds, glaciers > 1 km^{2} (0.386 sq mi or 247 acres) and river estuaries.

Terre-de-Bancalié (Languedocien: Tèrra de Bancaliá) is a commune in the Tarn department in southern France. It was established on 1 January 2019 by merger of the former communes of Roumégoux (the seat), Ronel, Saint-Antonin-de-Lacalm, Saint-Lieux-Lafenasse, Terre-Clapier and Le Travet.

== See also ==
- Communes of the Tarn department
