= Canton of Plaine de l'Agoût =

Coordinates: 43.59°N 2.11°E

The canton of Plaine de l'Agoût is an administrative division of the Tarn department, southern France. It was created at the French canton reorganisation which came into effect in March 2015. Its seat is in Sémalens.

It consists of the following communes:

1. Brousse
2. Cabanès
3. Carbes
4. Cuq
5. Damiatte
6. Fiac
7. Fréjeville
8. Jonquières
9. Laboulbène
10. Guitalens-L'Albarède
11. Lautrec
12. Magrin
13. Montdragon
14. Montpinier
15. Peyregoux
16. Prades
17. Pratviel
18. Puycalvel
19. Saint-Genest-de-Contest
20. Saint-Julien-du-Puy
21. Saint-Paul-Cap-de-Joux
22. Sémalens
23. Serviès
24. Teyssode
25. Vénès
26. Vielmur-sur-Agout
27. Viterbe
