= Carbes =

- Commune
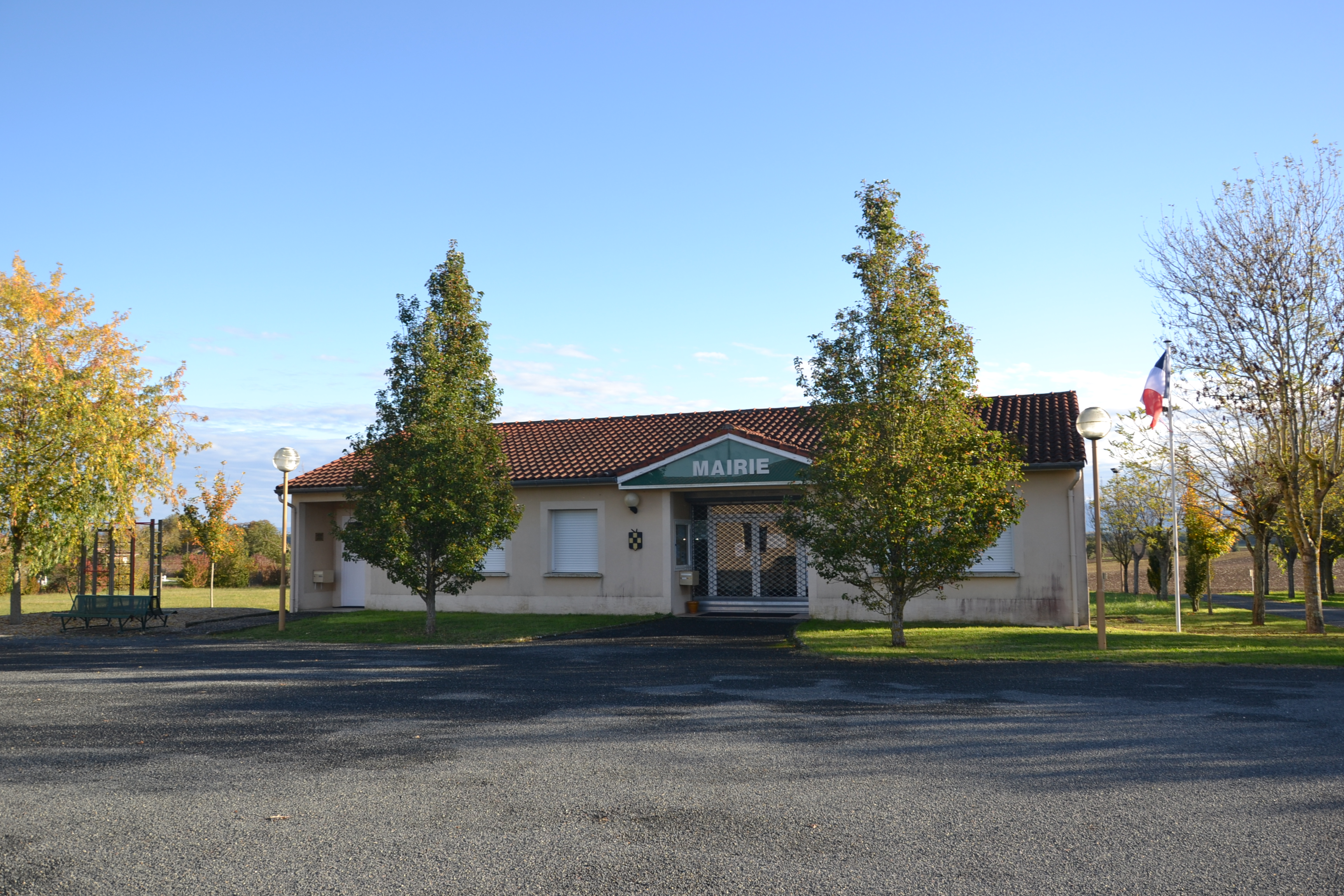
- Carbes Town hall

- Coat of arms
- Location of Carbes
- Location within France Location within Occitanie
- Coordinates: 43°38′33″N 2°09′24″E
- Country: France
- Region: Occitania
- Department: Tarn
- Arrondissement: Castres
- Canton: Plaine de l'Agoût
- Intercommunality: Lautrécois-Pays d'Agout

Government
  - Mayor (2020–2026): Jérôme Ourcet
- Area^{1}: 7.4 km^{2} (2.9 sq mi)
- Elevation: 200 m (660 ft)
- Highest elevation: 221 m (725 ft)
- Lowest elevation: 165 m (541 ft)
- Population (2023): 247
  - Density: 33/km^{2} (86/sq mi)
- Time zone: UTC+01:00 (CET)
  - Summer (DST): UTC+02:00 (CEST)
- INSEE/Postal code: 81058 /81570
- ^{1} French Land Register data, which excludes lakes, ponds, glaciers > 1 km^{2} (0.386 sq mi or 247 acres) and river estuaries.

Carbes (French pronunciation: [kaʁb]; Occitan: Carbas) is a commune in the Tarn department in southern France.

== See also ==
- Communes of the Tarn department
