= Serviès =

- Commune
- Coat of arms
- Location of Serviès
- Location within France Location within Occitanie
- Coordinates: 43°39′40″N 2°01′39″E
- Country: France
- Region: Occitania
- Department: Tarn
- Arrondissement: Castres
- Canton: Plaine de l'Agoût
- Intercommunality: Lautrécois-Pays d'Agout

Government
  - Mayor (2020–2026): Denis Barbera
- Area^{1}: 12.8 km^{2} (4.9 sq mi)
- Elevation: 140 m (460 ft)
- Highest elevation: 312 m (1,024 ft)
- Lowest elevation: 136 m (446 ft)
- Population (2023): 584
  - Density: 45.6/km^{2} (118/sq mi)
- Time zone: UTC+01:00 (CET)
  - Summer (DST): UTC+02:00 (CEST)
- INSEE/Postal code: 81286 /81220
- ^{1} French Land Register data, which excludes lakes, ponds, glaciers > 1 km^{2} (0.386 sq mi or 247 acres) and river estuaries.

Serviès (French pronunciation: [sɛʁvjɛs]; Occitan: Serviès) is a commune in the Tarn department in southern France.

== See also ==
- Communes of the Tarn department
