= Pratviel =

- Commune
- Coat of arms
- Location of Pratviel
- Location within France Location within Occitanie
- Coordinates: 43°38′21″N 1°53′05″E
- Country: France
- Region: Occitania
- Department: Tarn
- Arrondissement: Castres
- Canton: Plaine de l'Agoût
- Intercommunality: Lautrécois et Pays d'Agout

Government
  - Mayor (2020–2026): Pierre Bressolles
- Area^{1}: 7.11 km^{2} (2.75 sq mi)
- Elevation: 255 m (837 ft)
- Highest elevation: 311 m (1,020 ft)
- Lowest elevation: 167 m (548 ft)
- Population (2023): 91
  - Density: 13/km^{2} (33/sq mi)
- Time zone: UTC+01:00 (CET)
  - Summer (DST): UTC+02:00 (CEST)
- INSEE/Postal code: 81213 /81500
- ^{1} French Land Register data, which excludes lakes, ponds, glaciers > 1 km^{2} (0.386 sq mi or 247 acres) and river estuaries.

Pratviel (French pronunciation: [pʁatvjɛl]; Occitan: Pratvièlh) is a commune in the Tarn department and Occitanie region of southern France.

The name of the settlement – Prat Vièlh in Occitan – means "old meadow".

== See also ==
- Communes of the Tarn department
