= Laboutarie =

- Commune
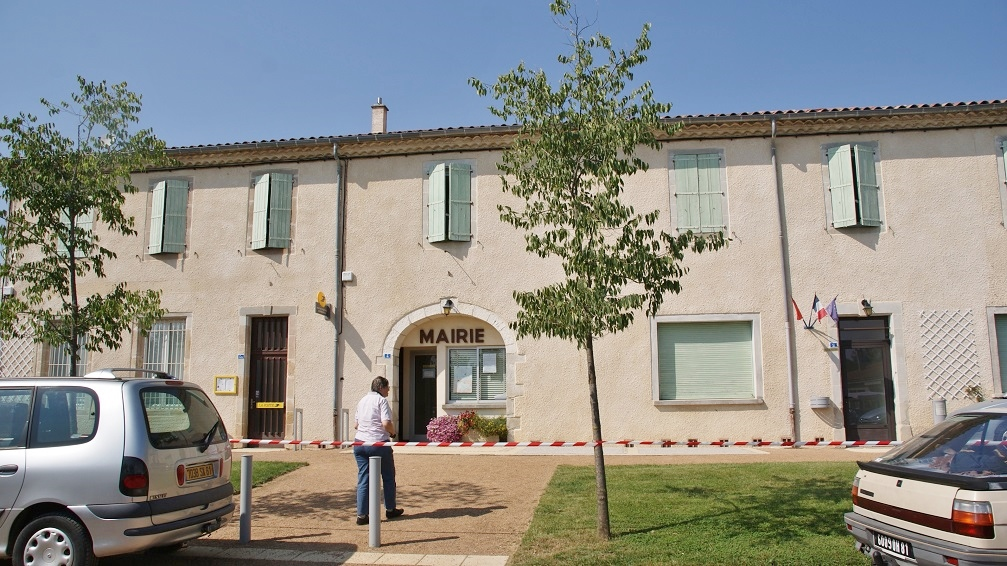
- Laboutarie Town hall
- Location of Laboutarie
- Location within France Location within Occitanie
- Coordinates: 43°47′02″N 2°07′08″E
- Country: France
- Region: Occitania
- Department: Tarn
- Arrondissement: Albi
- Canton: Le Haut Dadou

Government
  - Mayor (2020–2026): Serge Bourrel
- Area^{1}: 5.39 km^{2} (2.08 sq mi)
- Elevation: 175 m (574 ft)
- Highest elevation: 271 m (889 ft)
- Lowest elevation: 169 m (554 ft)
- Population (2023): 521
  - Density: 96.7/km^{2} (250/sq mi)
- Time zone: UTC+01:00 (CET)
  - Summer (DST): UTC+02:00 (CEST)
- INSEE/Postal code: 81119 /81120
- ^{1} French Land Register data, which excludes lakes, ponds, glaciers > 1 km^{2} (0.386 sq mi or 247 acres) and river estuaries.

Laboutarie (French pronunciation: [labutaʁi]; Occitan: La Botariá) is a commune in the Tarn department in southern France.

== Geography ==
The commune is traversed by the river Dadou.

== See also ==
- Communes of the Tarn department
