= Saint-Julien-du-Puy =

- Commune
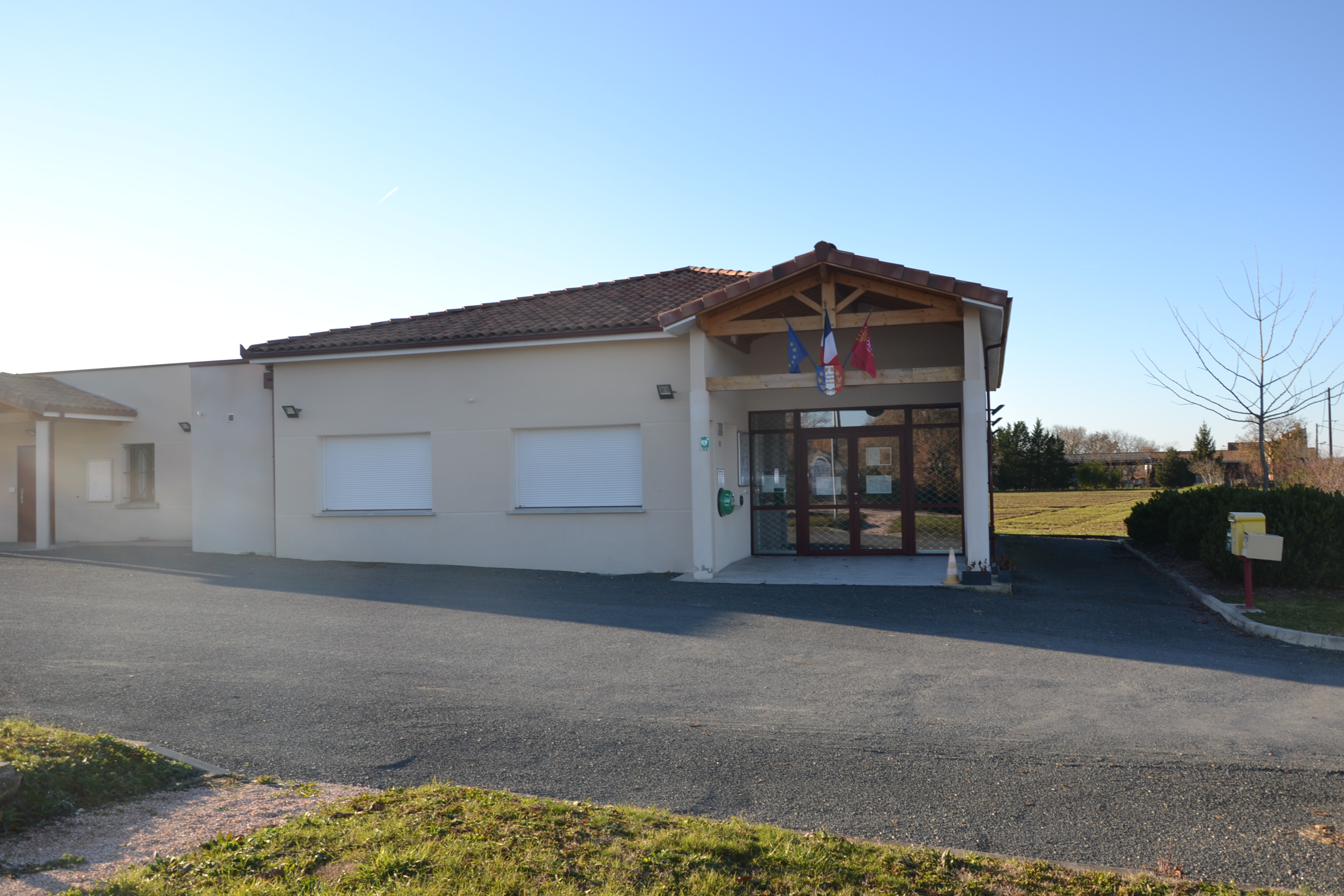
- Town hall

- Coat of arms
- Location of Saint-Julien-du-Puy
- Location within France Location within Occitanie
- Coordinates: 43°45′33″N 2°04′55″E
- Country: France
- Region: Occitania
- Department: Tarn
- Arrondissement: Castres
- Canton: Plaine de l'Agoût
- Intercommunality: Lautrécois et Pays d'Agout

Government
  - Mayor (2024–2026): Eric Mazars
- Area^{1}: 19.38 km^{2} (7.48 sq mi)
- Elevation: 230 m (750 ft)
- Highest elevation: 311 m (1,020 ft)
- Lowest elevation: 159 m (522 ft)
- Population (2023): 447
  - Density: 23.1/km^{2} (59.7/sq mi)
- Time zone: UTC+01:00 (CET)
  - Summer (DST): UTC+02:00 (CEST)
- INSEE/Postal code: 81258 /81440
- ^{1} French Land Register data, which excludes lakes, ponds, glaciers > 1 km^{2} (0.386 sq mi or 247 acres) and river estuaries.

Saint-Julien-du-Puy (French pronunciation: [sɛ̃ ʒyljɛ̃ dy pɥi]; Languedocien: Sant Julian dal Puòg) is a commune in the Tarn department and Occitanie region of southern France.

== Geography ==
The commune is traversed by the river Dadou.

== See also ==
- Communes of the Tarn department
