= Vénès =

- Commune
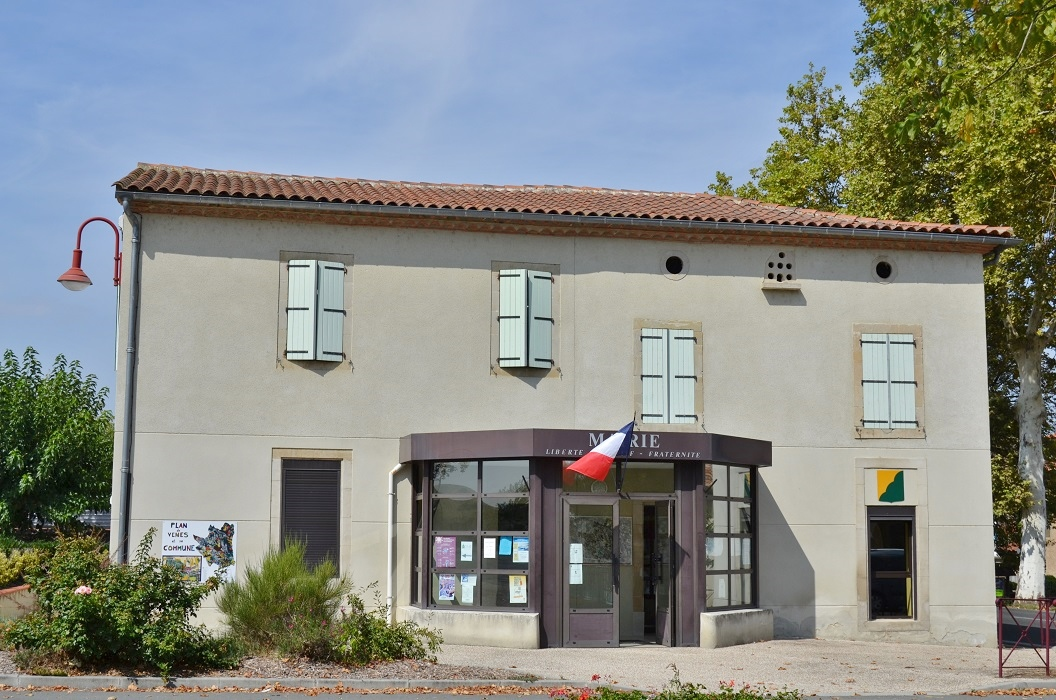
- Vénès Town hall

- Coat of arms
- Location of Vénès
- Location within France Location within Occitanie
- Coordinates: 43°43′43″N 2°11′34″E
- Country: France
- Region: Occitania
- Department: Tarn
- Arrondissement: Castres
- Canton: Plaine de l'Agoût

Government
  - Mayor (2020–2026): Christian Galzin
- Area^{1}: 27.42 km^{2} (10.59 sq mi)
- Elevation: 247 m (810 ft)
- Highest elevation: 328 m (1,076 ft)
- Lowest elevation: 184 m (604 ft)
- Population (2023): 718
  - Density: 26.2/km^{2} (67.8/sq mi)
- Time zone: UTC+01:00 (CET)
  - Summer (DST): UTC+02:00 (CEST)
- INSEE/Postal code: 81311 /81440
- ^{1} French Land Register data, which excludes lakes, ponds, glaciers > 1 km^{2} (0.386 sq mi or 247 acres) and river estuaries.

Vénès (French pronunciation: [venɛs]; Occitan: Venés) is a commune in the Tarn department in southern France.

== Geography ==
The commune is traversed by the river Dadou.

== See also ==
- Communes of the Tarn department
