= Guitalens-L'Albarède =

- Commune
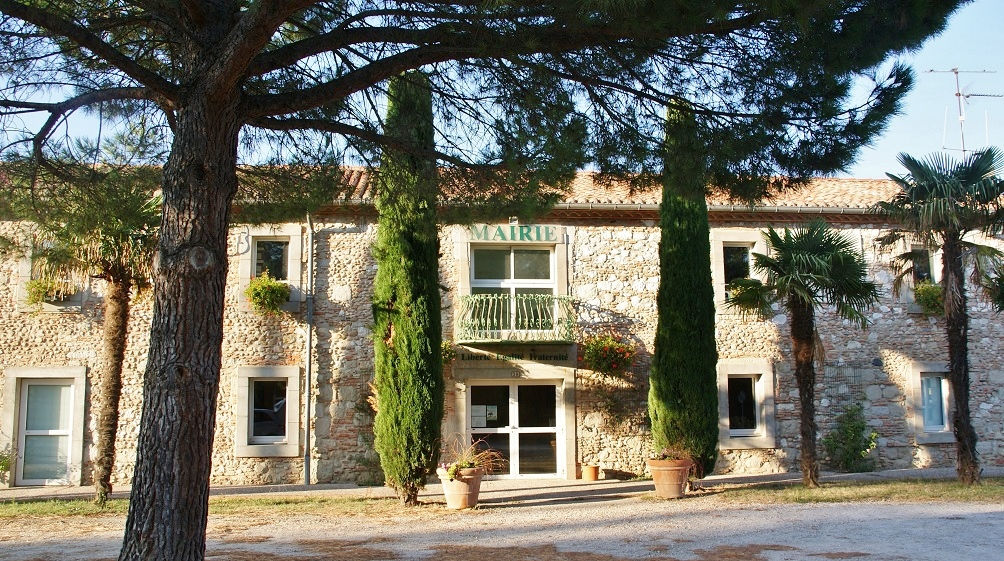
- Guitalens-L'Albarède Town hall

- Coat of arms
- Location of Guitalens-L'Albarède
- Location within France Location within Occitanie
- Coordinates: 43°38′38″N 2°02′17″E
- Country: France
- Region: Occitania
- Department: Tarn
- Arrondissement: Castres
- Canton: Plaine de l'Agoût
- Intercommunality: Lautrécois-Pays d'Agout

Government
  - Mayor (2020–2026): Raymond Gardelle
- Area^{1}: 5.65 km^{2} (2.18 sq mi)
- Elevation: 145 m (476 ft)
- Highest elevation: 290 m (950 ft)
- Lowest elevation: 139 m (456 ft)
- Population (2023): 871
  - Density: 154/km^{2} (399/sq mi)
- Time zone: UTC+01:00 (CET)
  - Summer (DST): UTC+02:00 (CEST)
- INSEE/Postal code: 81132 /81220
- ^{1} French Land Register data, which excludes lakes, ponds, glaciers > 1 km^{2} (0.386 sq mi or 247 acres) and river estuaries.

Guitalens-L'Albarède (French pronunciation: [ɡitalɛ̃s lalbaʁɛd]; Occitan: Guitalens e l'Albareda) is a commune in the Tarn department in southern France. On 29 June 2007, the commune was formed by the amalgamation of Guitalens and L'Albarède.

== See also ==
- Communes of the Tarn department
