= Sémalens =

- Commune
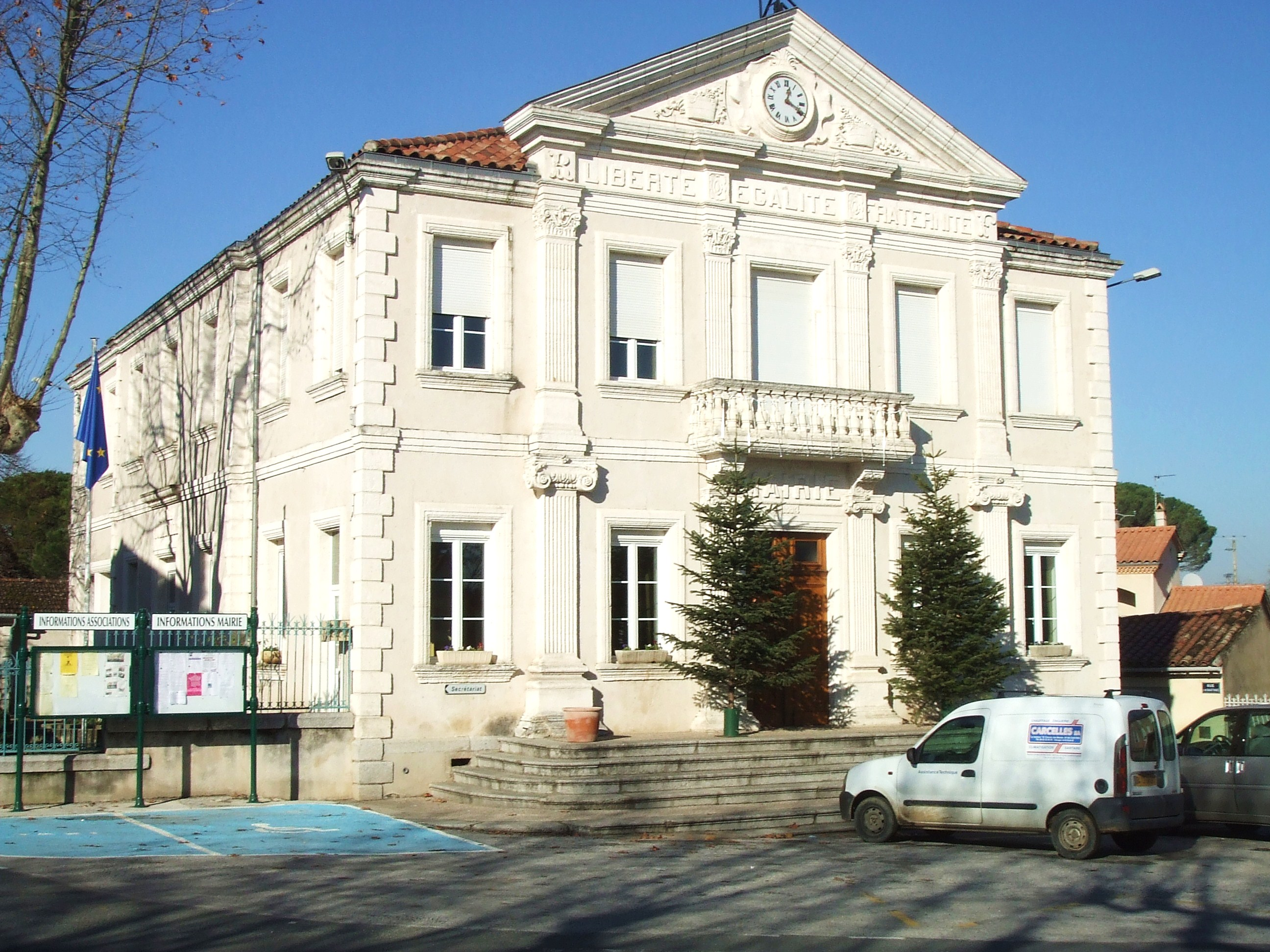
- The town hall in Sémalens

- Coat of arms
- Location of Sémalens
- Location within France Location within Occitanie
- Coordinates: 43°35′32″N 2°06′42″E
- Country: France
- Region: Occitania
- Department: Tarn
- Arrondissement: Castres
- Canton: Plaine de l'Agoût
- Intercommunality: CC du Sor et de l'Agout

Government
  - Mayor (2020–2026): Annette Veith
- Area^{1}: 11.12 km^{2} (4.29 sq mi)
- Elevation: 160 m (520 ft)
- Highest elevation: 280 m (920 ft)
- Lowest elevation: 146 m (479 ft)
- Population (2023): 2,020
  - Density: 182/km^{2} (470/sq mi)
- Time zone: UTC+01:00 (CET)
  - Summer (DST): UTC+02:00 (CEST)
- INSEE/Postal code: 81281 /81570
- ^{1} French Land Register data, which excludes lakes, ponds, glaciers > 1 km^{2} (0.386 sq mi or 247 acres) and river estuaries.

Sémalens (French pronunciation: [semalɛ̃s]; Occitan: Semalens) is a commune in the Tarn department in southern France.

== Population ==
Historical population
Year	Pop.	±% p.a.
1968	1,004	—
1975	1,232	+2.97%
1982	1,412	+1.97%
1990	1,651	+1.97%
1999	1,843	+1.23%
2007	1,999	+1.02%
2012	2,004	+0.05%
2017	2,013	+0.09%
2023	2,020	+0.06%
Source: INSEE

== See also ==
- Communes of the Tarn department
