= Brousses =

Brousses is part of the name of the following communes in France:

- Brousses-et-Villaret, in the Aude department
- Revest-des-Brousses, in the Alpes-de-Haute-Provence department
- Saint-Maurice-les-Brousses, in the Haute-Vienne department

== See also ==
- Brousse (disambiguation)
