= Fiac =

- Commune
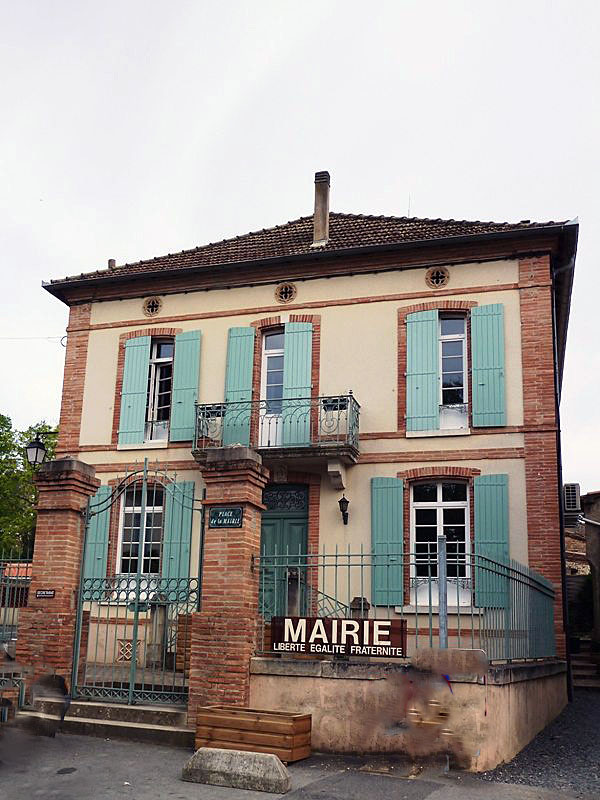
- Fiac Town hall

- Coat of arms
- Location of Fiac
- Location within France Location within Occitanie
- Coordinates: 43°42′09″N 1°54′28″E
- Country: France
- Region: Occitania
- Department: Tarn
- Arrondissement: Castres
- Canton: Plaine de l'Agoût
- Intercommunality: Lautrécois-Pays d'Agout

Government
  - Mayor (2023–2026): Judith Ajchenbaum
- Area^{1}: 25 km^{2} (9.7 sq mi)
- Elevation: 250 m (820 ft)
- Highest elevation: 252 m (827 ft)
- Lowest elevation: 115 m (377 ft)
- Population (2023): 930
  - Density: 37/km^{2} (96/sq mi)
- Time zone: UTC+01:00 (CET)
  - Summer (DST): UTC+02:00 (CEST)
- INSEE/Postal code: 81092 /81500
- ^{1} French Land Register data, which excludes lakes, ponds, glaciers > 1 km^{2} (0.386 sq mi or 247 acres) and river estuaries.

Fiac (French pronunciation: [fjak]) is a commune in the Tarn department in southern France.

== See also ==
- Communes of the Tarn department
