= Le Masnau-Massuguiès =

- Commune
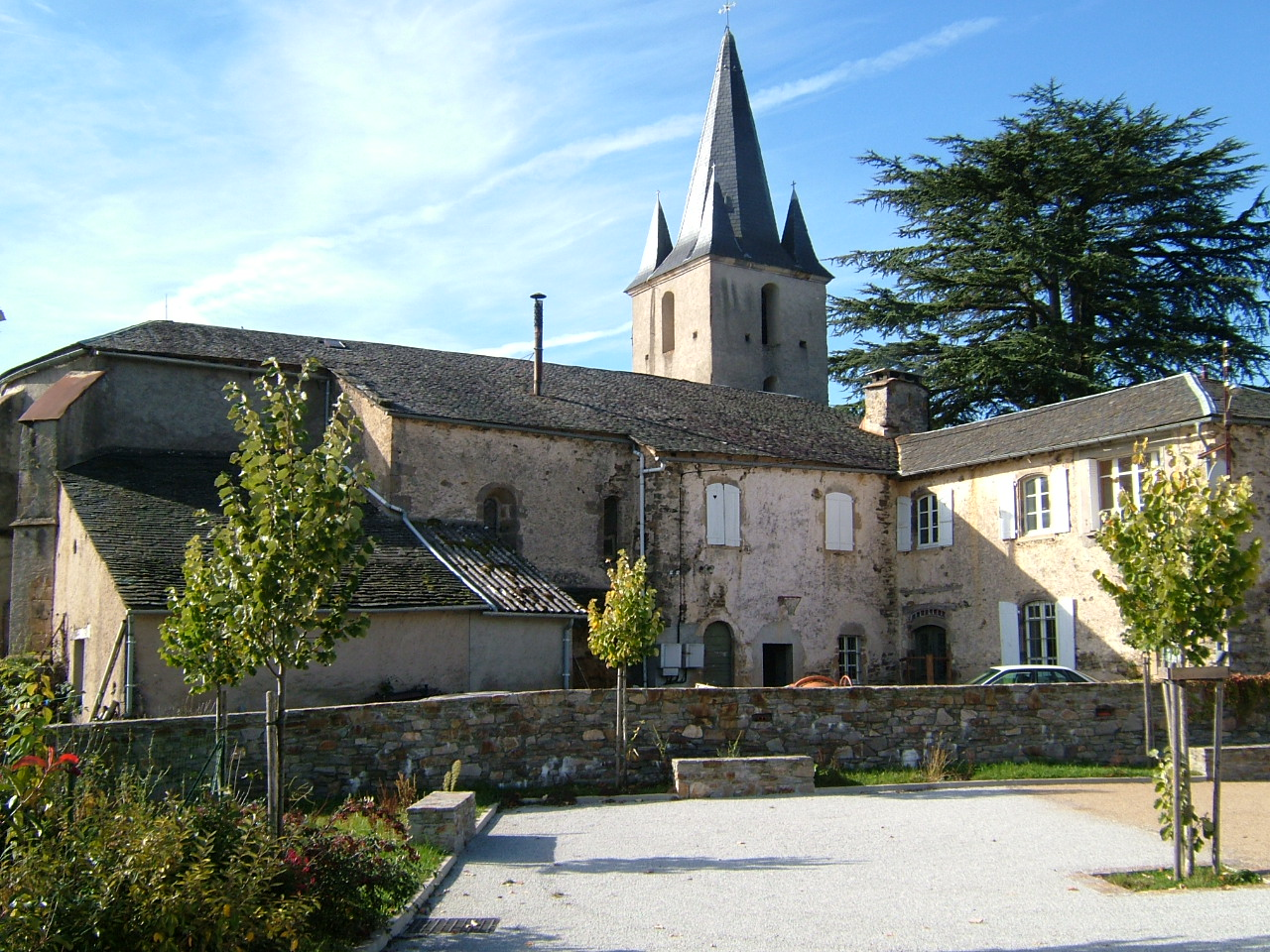
- The church in Le Masnau-Massuguiès

- Coat of arms
- Location of Le Masnau-Massuguiès
- Location within France Location within Occitanie
- Coordinates: 43°48′13″N 2°30′33″E
- Country: France
- Region: Occitania
- Department: Tarn
- Arrondissement: Castres
- Canton: Les Hautes Terres d'Oc
- Intercommunality: Sidobre Vals et Plateaux

Government
  - Mayor (2020–2026): Nicolas Alibert
- Area^{1}: 47.63 km^{2} (18.39 sq mi)
- Elevation: 650 m (2,130 ft)
- Highest elevation: 859 m (2,818 ft)
- Lowest elevation: 498 m (1,634 ft)
- Population (2023): 248
  - Density: 5.21/km^{2} (13.5/sq mi)
- Time zone: UTC+01:00 (CET)
  - Summer (DST): UTC+02:00 (CEST)
- INSEE/Postal code: 81158 /81530
- ^{1} French Land Register data, which excludes lakes, ponds, glaciers > 1 km^{2} (0.386 sq mi or 247 acres) and river estuaries.

Le Masnau-Massuguiès (French pronunciation: [lə masno masyɡjɛs]; Occitan: Lo Mas Nòu e Massuguièrs) is a commune in the Tarn department in southern France.

== Geography ==
The Dadou flows west-southwestward through the middle of the commune; it forms part of the commune's eastern and western borders.

== See also ==
- Communes of the Tarn department
