= Mont-Roc =

- Commune
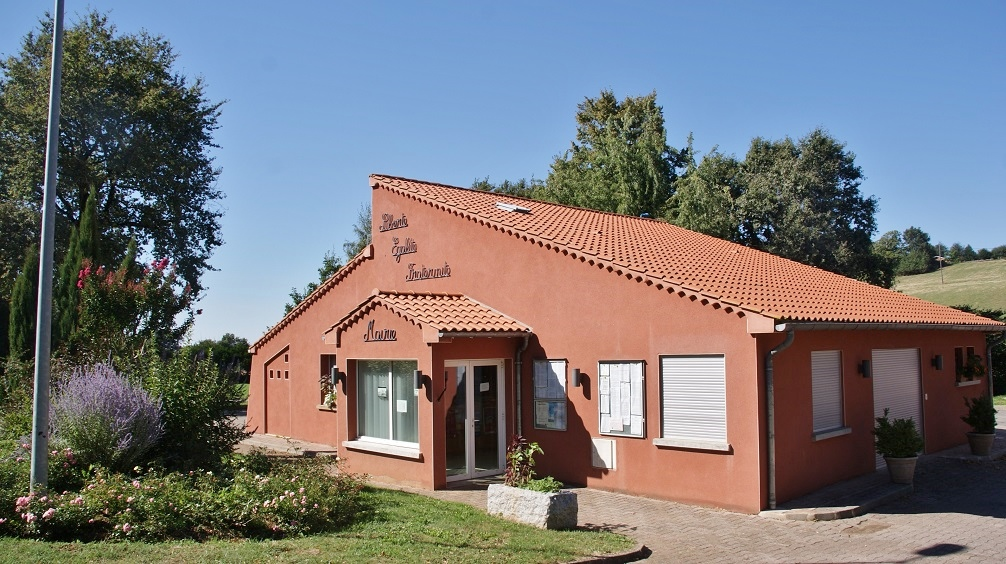
- Mont-Roc Town hall

- Coat of arms
- Location of Mont-Roc
- Location within France Location within Occitanie
- Coordinates: 43°48′11″N 2°22′12″E
- Country: France
- Region: Occitania
- Department: Tarn
- Arrondissement: Castres
- Canton: Le Haut Dadou

Government
  - Mayor (2020–2026): Alain Séverac
- Area^{1}: 14.18 km^{2} (5.47 sq mi)
- Elevation: 560 m (1,840 ft)
- Highest elevation: 625 m (2,051 ft)
- Lowest elevation: 319 m (1,047 ft)
- Population (2023): 198
  - Density: 14.0/km^{2} (36.2/sq mi)
- Time zone: UTC+01:00 (CET)
  - Summer (DST): UTC+02:00 (CEST)
- INSEE/Postal code: 81183 /81120
- ^{1} French Land Register data, which excludes lakes, ponds, glaciers > 1 km^{2} (0.386 sq mi or 247 acres) and river estuaries.

Mont-Roc (French pronunciation: [mɔ̃ ʁɔk]; Occitan: Montròc) is a commune in the Tarn department in southern France.

== Geography ==
The commune is traversed by the river Dadou.

== See also ==
- Communes of the Tarn department
