= Saint-Lieux-Lafenasse =

- Part of Terre-de-Bancalié
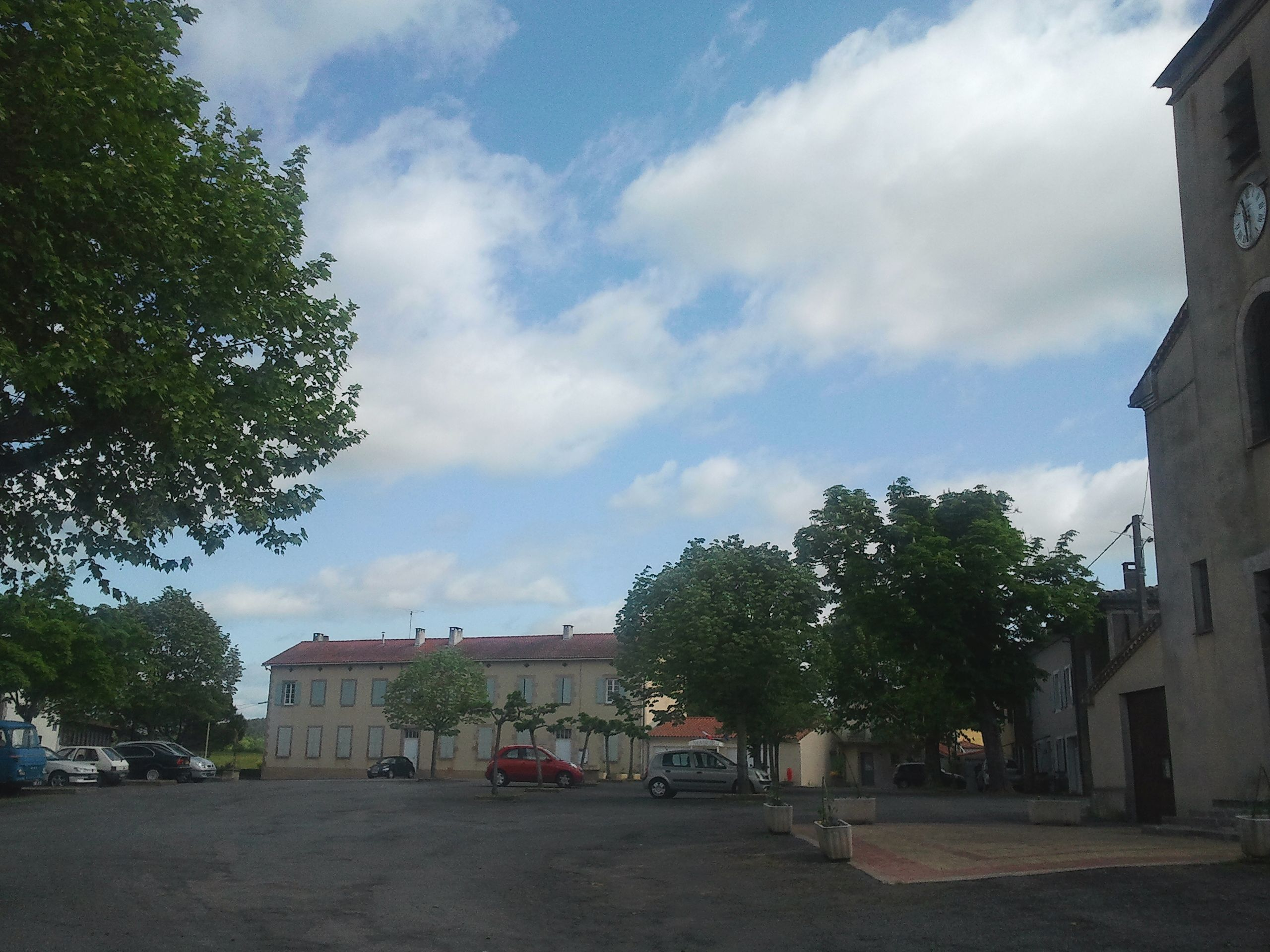
- The main plaza in Lafenasse

- Coat of arms
- Location of Saint-Lieux-Lafenasse
- Location within France Location within Occitanie
- Coordinates: 43°46′09″N 2°13′47″E
- Country: France
- Region: Occitania
- Department: Tarn
- Arrondissement: Albi
- Canton: Le Haut Dadou
- Commune: Terre-de-Bancalié
- Area^{1}: 12.19 km^{2} (4.71 sq mi)
- Elevation: 320 m (1,050 ft)
- Highest elevation: 365 m (1,198 ft)
- Lowest elevation: 197 m (646 ft)
- Population (2022): 445
  - Density: 36.5/km^{2} (94.5/sq mi)
- Time zone: UTC+01:00 (CET)
  - Summer (DST): UTC+02:00 (CEST)
- Postal code: 81120
- ^{1} French Land Register data, which excludes lakes, ponds, glaciers > 1 km^{2} (0.386 sq mi or 247 acres) and river estuaries.

Saint-Lieux-Lafenasse (Languedocien: Sant Lionçe La Fenassa) is a former commune in the Tarn department in southern France. On 1 January 2019, it was merged into the new commune Terre-de-Bancalié.

== Geography ==
The commune is traversed by the river Dadou.

== See also ==
- Communes of the Tarn department
