= Montdragon =

- Commune
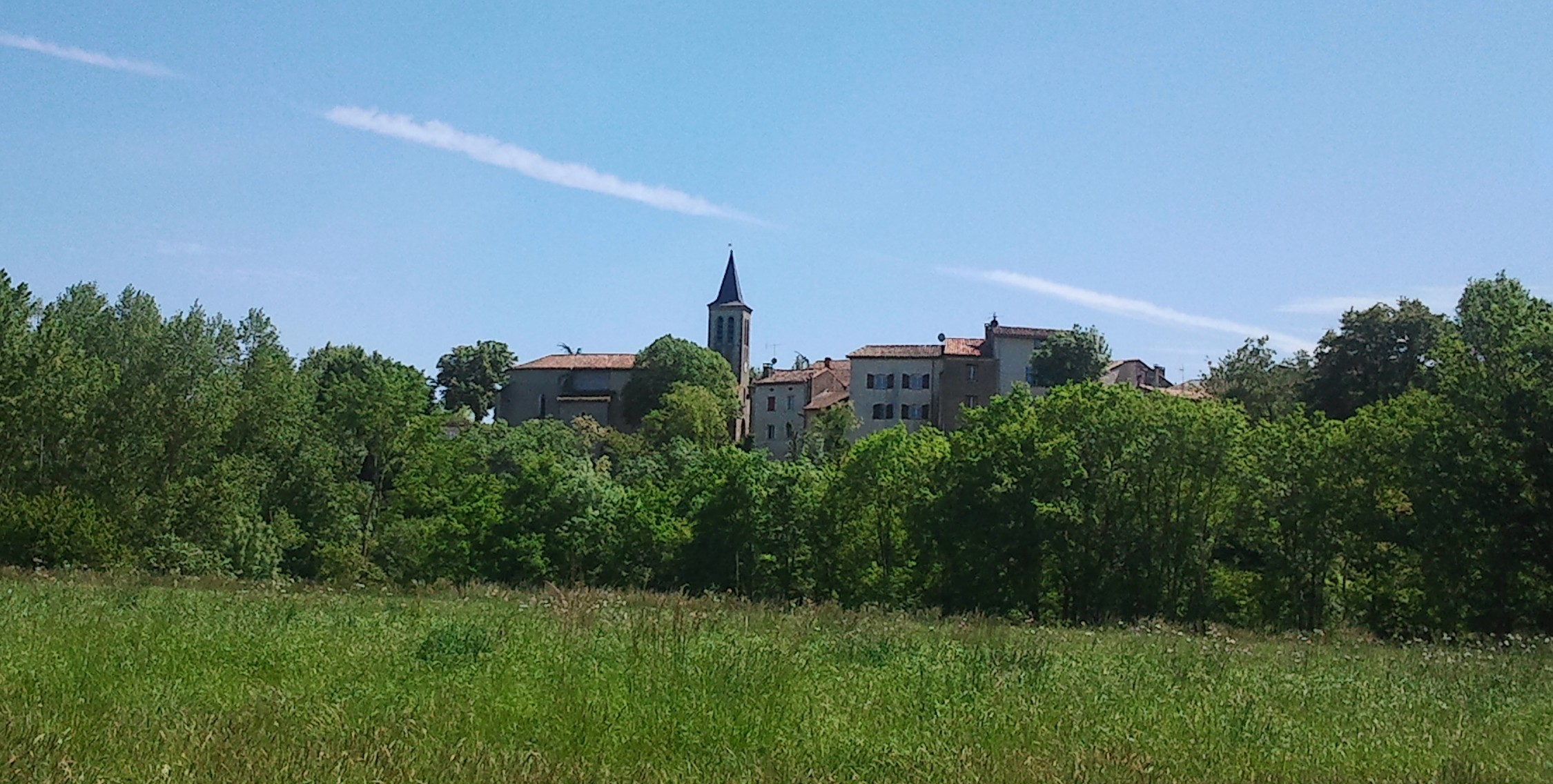
- Montdragon

- Coat of arms
- Location of Montdragon
- Location within France Location within Occitanie
- Coordinates: 43°46′30″N 2°06′13″E
- Country: France
- Region: Occitania
- Department: Tarn
- Arrondissement: Castres
- Canton: Plaine de l'Agoût
- Intercommunality: Lautrécois-Pays d'Agout

Government
  - Mayor (2020–2026): Gilbert Vernhes
- Area^{1}: 12.19 km^{2} (4.71 sq mi)
- Elevation: 190 m (620 ft)
- Highest elevation: 302 m (991 ft)
- Lowest elevation: 159 m (522 ft)
- Population (2023): 614
  - Density: 50.4/km^{2} (130/sq mi)
- Time zone: UTC+01:00 (CET)
  - Summer (DST): UTC+02:00 (CEST)
- INSEE/Postal code: 81174 /81440
- ^{1} French Land Register data, which excludes lakes, ponds, glaciers > 1 km^{2} (0.386 sq mi or 247 acres) and river estuaries.

Montdragon (French pronunciation: [mɔ̃dʁaɡɔ̃]) is a commune in the Tarn department in southern France.

== Geography ==
The commune is traversed by the river Dadou.

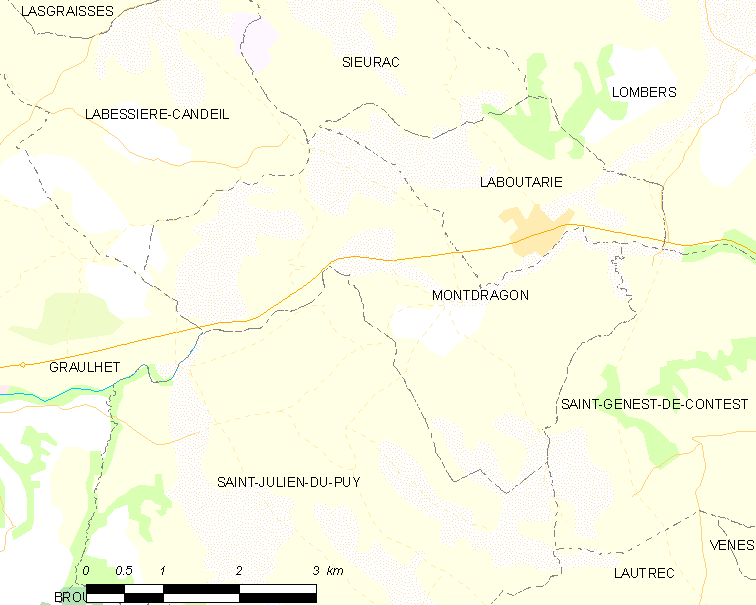
Map of Montdragon and its surrounding communes

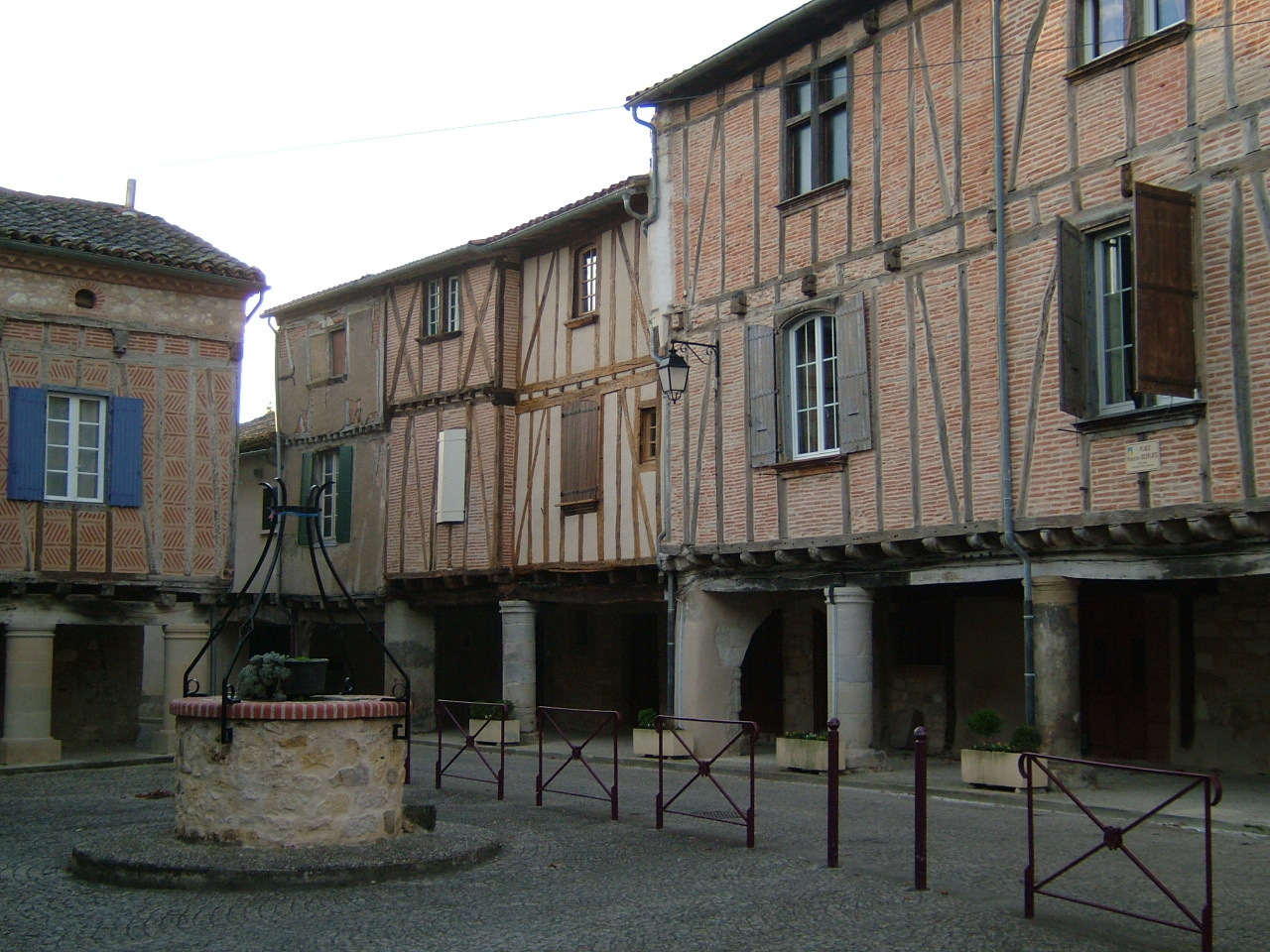
Timbered houses in the square

== See also ==
- Communes of the Tarn department
