= Fréjeville =

- Commune
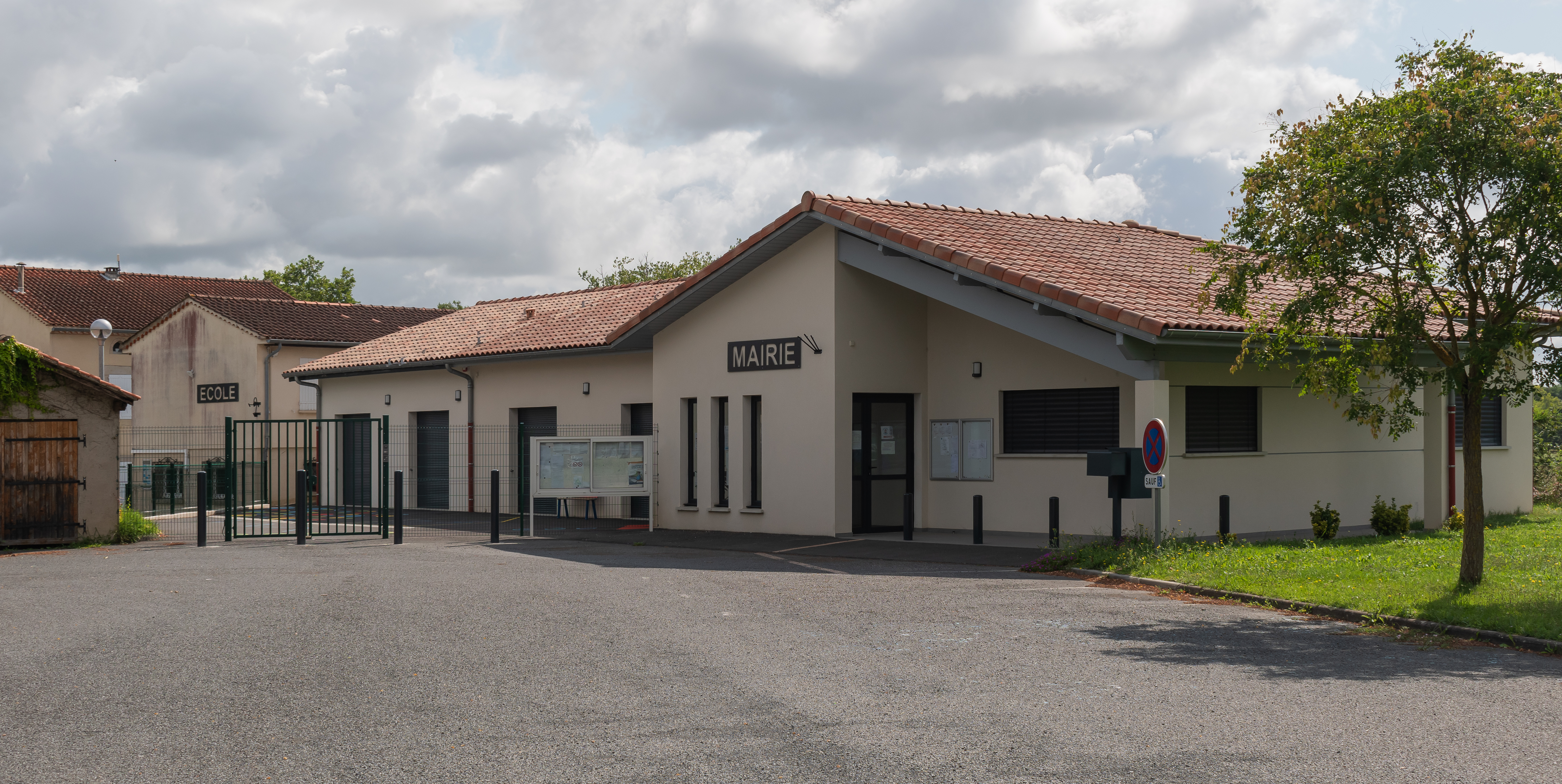
- Town hall of Frejeville

- Coat of arms
- Location of Fréjeville
- Location within France Location within Occitanie
- Coordinates: 43°36′38″N 2°08′30″E
- Country: France
- Region: Occitania
- Department: Tarn
- Arrondissement: Castres
- Canton: Plaine de l'Agoût
- Intercommunality: Lautrécois-Pays d'Agout

Government
  - Mayor (2021–2026): José Nunes
- Area^{1}: 9.48 km^{2} (3.66 sq mi)
- Elevation: 180 m (590 ft)
- Highest elevation: 231 m (758 ft)
- Lowest elevation: 145 m (476 ft)
- Population (2023): 712
  - Density: 75.1/km^{2} (195/sq mi)
- Time zone: UTC+01:00 (CET)
  - Summer (DST): UTC+02:00 (CEST)
- INSEE/Postal code: 81098 /81570
- ^{1} French Land Register data, which excludes lakes, ponds, glaciers > 1 km^{2} (0.386 sq mi or 247 acres) and river estuaries.

Fréjeville is a commune in the Tarn department in southern France.

== See also ==
- Communes of the Tarn department
