= Damiatte =

- Commune
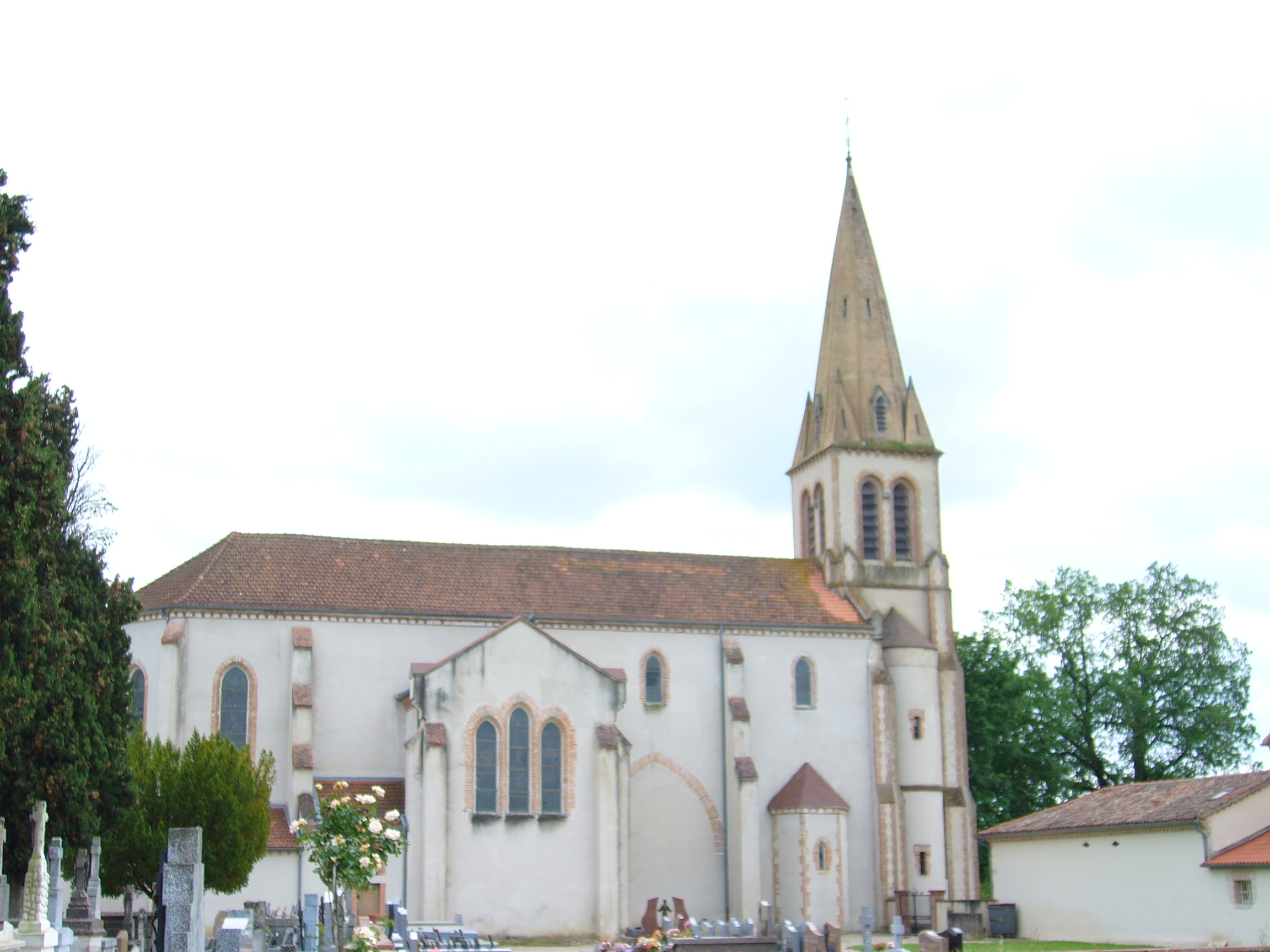
- The church in Damiatte

- Coat of arms
- Location of Damiatte
- Location within France Location within Occitanie
- Coordinates: 43°39′14″N 1°58′35″E
- Country: France
- Region: Occitania
- Department: Tarn
- Arrondissement: Castres
- Canton: Plaine de l'Agoût
- Intercommunality: Lautrécois-Pays d'Agout

Government
  - Mayor (2020–2026): Évelyne Faddi
- Area^{1}: 31.78 km^{2} (12.27 sq mi)
- Elevation: 145 m (476 ft)
- Highest elevation: 350 m (1,150 ft)
- Lowest elevation: 125 m (410 ft)
- Population (2023): 1,062
  - Density: 33.42/km^{2} (86.55/sq mi)
- Time zone: UTC+01:00 (CET)
  - Summer (DST): UTC+02:00 (CEST)
- INSEE/Postal code: 81078 /81220
- ^{1} French Land Register data, which excludes lakes, ponds, glaciers > 1 km^{2} (0.386 sq mi or 247 acres) and river estuaries.

Damiatte (French pronunciation: [damjat]; Occitan: Damiata) is a commune in the Tarn department in southern France.

== See also ==
- Communes of the Tarn department
