= Prades, Tarn =

Prades
- Commune
- Coat of arms
- Location of Prades
- Location within France Location within Occitanie
- Coordinates: 43°36′51″N 1°58′28″E
- Country: France
- Region: Occitania
- Department: Tarn
- Arrondissement: Castres
- Canton: Plaine de l'Agoût
- Intercommunality: Lautrécois-Pays d'Agout

Government
  - Mayor (2020–2026): Marc Curetti
- Area^{1}: 5.24 km^{2} (2.02 sq mi)
- Elevation: 230 m (750 ft)
- Highest elevation: 330 m (1,080 ft)
- Lowest elevation: 177 m (581 ft)
- Population (2023): 123
  - Density: 23.5/km^{2} (60.8/sq mi)
- Time zone: UTC+01:00 (CET)
  - Summer (DST): UTC+02:00 (CEST)
- INSEE/Postal code: 81212 /81220
- ^{1} French Land Register data, which excludes lakes, ponds, glaciers > 1 km^{2} (0.386 sq mi or 247 acres) and river estuaries.

Prades (French pronunciation: [pʁad]; Occitan: Pradas, meaning prairies) is a commune in the Tarn department in southern France.

== See also ==
- Communes of the Tarn department
