= USS La Prade =

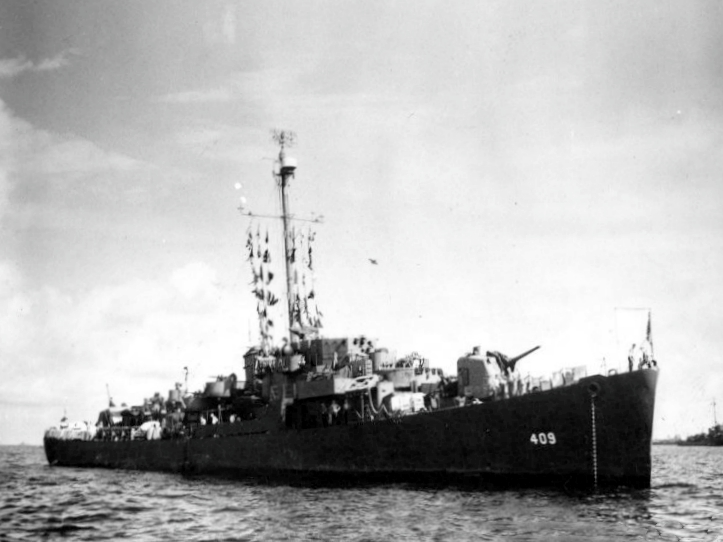
- USS La Prade (DE-409) at Ulithi atoll, c. 1945

History

United States
- Name: La Prade
- Namesake: Robert M. La Prade
- Builder: Brown Shipbuilding, Houston, Texas
- Laid down: 18 November 1943
- Launched: 31 December 1943
- Commissioned: 20 April 1944
- Decommissioned: 11 May 1946
- Stricken: 15 January 1972
- Fate: Sold for scrapping 15 January 1973

General characteristics
- Class & type: John C. Butler-class destroyer escort
- Displacement: 1,350 long tons (1,372 t)
- Length: 306 ft (93 m)
- Beam: 36 ft 8 in (11.18 m)
- Draft: 9 ft 5 in (2.87 m)
- Propulsion: 2 boilers, 2 geared turbine engines, 12,000 shp (8,900 kW); 2 propellers
- Speed: 24 knots (44 km/h)
- Range: 6,000 nautical miles (11,000 km) at 12 knots (22 km/h)
- Complement: 14 officers, 201 enlisted
- Armament: 2 × single 5 in (127 mm) guns; 2 × twin 40 mm (1.6 in) AA guns; 10 × single 20 mm (0.79 in) AA guns; 1 × triple 21 in (533 mm) torpedo tubes; 8 × depth charge throwers; 1 × Hedgehog ASW mortar; 2 × depth charge racks

USS La Prade (DE-409) was a John C. Butler-class destroyer escort in service with the United States Navy from 1944 to 1946. She was scrapped in 1973.

The ship was named in honor of USMC First Lieutenant Robert M. La Prade who was awarded the Navy Cross for bravery in action in the Guadalcanal Campaign.

== Namesake ==
Robert Maitland La Prade was born on 4 August 1916 at Kenedy, Texas. He received a Bachelor of Arts degree from Rice Institute on 1 June 1942.

He served in the United States Army prior to enlisting in the U.S. Marine Corps on 16 April 1940. Commissioned First Lieutenant on 1 January 1943 while serving in the Pacific campaign he died of wounds received in the action at Guadalcanal. He awarded the Navy Cross posthumously for action against enemy Japanese Forces at Guadalcanal on 20 January 1943. The medal citation reads in part:

Operating behind the enemy lines, Lieutenant La Prade, in command of a combat patrol which wiped out one enemy machinegun position, was critically wounded twice. . . . Despite his insistence that they leave him behind, he was carried back to our lines where he with unfaltering disregard for his own ebbing strength, continued to give directions and formation until he lost consciousness. His indomitable fighting spirit and inspiring devotion to the accomplishment of an important mission were in keeping with the highest traditions of the U.S. Naval Service...

== History ==
The destroyer escort's keel was laid down on 18 November 1943 by Brown Shipbuilding Co. at their yard in Houston, Texas. The ship was launched on 31 December 1943, sponsored by Mrs. J. T. La Prade, mother of the late Lieutenant La Prade, and commissioned on 20 April 1944.

=== World War II ===
Completing shakedown off Bermuda, La Prade departed Norfolk, Virginia on 27 June 1944 for the Pacific Ocean, arriving at Pearl Harbor on 25 July. The destroyer escort engaged in ASW, screening, and escort operations out of Pearl Harbor and departed 8 September for Eniwetok. Operating out of Eniwetok and Ulithi, La Prade continued escort and patrol services, sailing with a hunter-killer task group during the Palau Islands invasion. When the Palaus, needed as logistic bases for the Philippine Islands invasion, were secure, La Prade returned to Eniwetok 9 October and resumed escort and patrol duty.

While escorting the damaged cruiser USS Canberra to Manus on 12 November, La Prade was detached to aid a distressed PBM seaplane. The destroyer escort salvaged the portable equipment and stood guard until Onslow arrived to direct the rescue operations. From November 1944 until March 1945, La Prade escorted convoys to Leyte, Manus, and Ulithi. She also joined Casco in a joint attack on a Japanese midget submarine in the entrance to Kossol Roads Harbor, Palau Islands.

Departing Ulithi on 30 March, she steamed toward Okinawa to join the screen for oilers engaged in replenishing Vice Admiral Mitscher's fast carrier task force. With American troops struggling to establish a garrison next door to Japan, the oilers and their screening units played a vital role in keeping supplies moving into the embattled island. La Prade continued to support the campaign until Okinawa was declared secured on 26 June. La Prade performed escort and patrol operations for the rest of the war before joining the Japan occupation forces at Sasebo on 23 September.

== Decommissioning ==
The destroyer escort returned to Okinawa on 10 October and four days later headed home, arriving at San Diego, California on 5 November. La Prade remained at San Diego until 11 May 1946 when she commissioned and joined the Pacific Reserve Fleet. Stricken 15 January 1972, the vessel was sold for scrapping on 15 January 1973.

== Awards ==
La Prade received one battle star for World War II service.
