= Saint-Antonin-de-Lacalm =

- Part of Terre-de-Bancalié
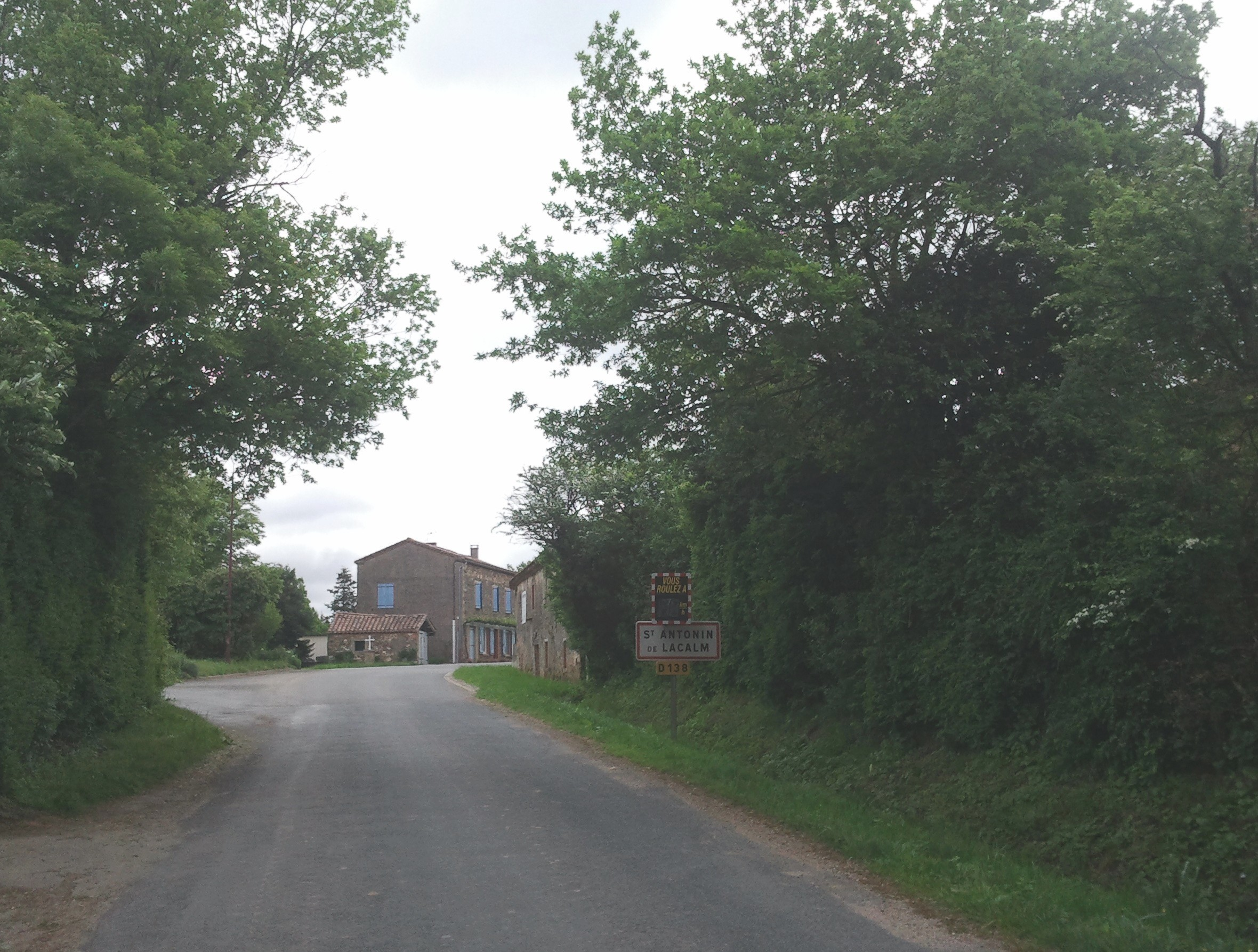
- The entrance of Saint-Antonin-de-Lacalm on the road D138

- Coat of arms
- Location of Saint-Antonin-de-Lacalm
- Location within France Location within Occitanie
- Coordinates: 43°47′13″N 2°18′22″E
- Country: France
- Region: Occitania
- Department: Tarn
- Arrondissement: Albi
- Canton: Le Haut Dadou
- Commune: Terre-de-Bancalié
- Area^{1}: 28.09 km^{2} (10.85 sq mi)
- Elevation: 455 m (1,493 ft)
- Highest elevation: 529 m (1,736 ft)
- Lowest elevation: 230 m (750 ft)
- Population (2023): 284
  - Density: 10.1/km^{2} (26.2/sq mi)
- Time zone: UTC+01:00 (CET)
  - Summer (DST): UTC+02:00 (CEST)
- Postal code: 81120
- ^{1} French Land Register data, which excludes lakes, ponds, glaciers > 1 km^{2} (0.386 sq mi or 247 acres) and river estuaries.

Saint-Antonin-de-Lacalm (Languedocien: Sent Antonin de la Calm) is a former commune in the Tarn department in southern France. On 1 January 2019, it was merged into the new commune Terre-de-Bancalié.

== Geography ==
The commune is traversed by the river Dadou.

== Population ==
Historical population
Year	Pop.	±% p.a.
1962	316	—
1968	356	+2.01%
1975	261	−4.34%
1982	255	−0.33%
1990	243	−0.60%
1999	237	−0.28%
2006	242	+0.30%
2023	284	+0.95%
Source: EHESS and INSEE (2023)

== See also ==
- Communes of the Tarn department
