= Brousse, Tarn =

Brousse
- Commune
- Location of Brousse
- Location within France Location within Occitanie
- Coordinates: 43°43′07″N 2°04′25″E
- Country: France
- Region: Occitania
- Department: Tarn
- Arrondissement: Castres
- Canton: Plaine de l'Agoût
- Intercommunality: Lautrécois-Pays d'Agout

Government
  - Mayor (2020–2026): Mathieu Fau
- Area^{1}: 14.77 km^{2} (5.70 sq mi)
- Elevation: 268 m (879 ft)
- Highest elevation: 371 m (1,217 ft)
- Lowest elevation: 196 m (643 ft)
- Population (2023): 438
  - Density: 29.7/km^{2} (76.8/sq mi)
- Time zone: UTC+01:00 (CET)
  - Summer (DST): UTC+02:00 (CEST)
- INSEE/Postal code: 81040 /81440
- ^{1} French Land Register data, which excludes lakes, ponds, glaciers > 1 km^{2} (0.386 sq mi or 247 acres) and river estuaries.

Brousse (French pronunciation: [bʁus]; Occitan: Brossa) is a commune in the Tarn department in southern France.

== See also ==
- Communes of the Tarn department
