= Robert F. LaPrade =

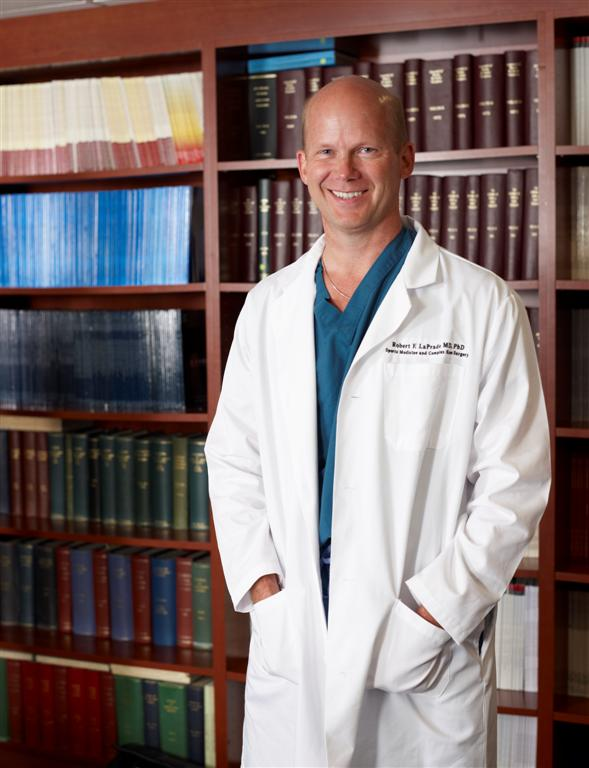
- Education: University of Oslo, (PhD); University of Illinois at Chicago, (MD)
- Medical career
- Profession: Orthopedic surgeon
- Field: Knee surgeon
- Institutions: Twin Cities Orthopedics, Edina, Minnesota
- Sub-specialties: posterolateral knee injuries
- Awards: 2013 OREF Clinical Research Award

Robert F. LaPrade is a knee surgeon, practicing at Twin Cities Orthopedics in Edina, Minnesota. He is a specialist in treating posterolateral knee injuries. He has received the 2013 OREF Clinical Research Award for his research in improving outcomes for these injuries, and is the author of a textbook on the subject.

== Education ==
LaPrade attended the University of Maine in Orono, ME and received his Bachelor of Science degree in Forest engineering in 1981. He completed his medical degree at the University of Illinois at Chicago in 1987 and his medical internship at Michigan State University in 1988. LaPrade's medical residency was also completed at Michigan State University/Kalamazoo Center for Medical Studies in Kalamazoo, MI from 1989 to 1993. Afterwards, he completed a fellowship at the Hughston Sports Medicine Clinic in Columbus, GA. LaPrade received a Doctor of Philosophy degree from the University of Oslo, in Oslo, Norway, in 2003 based on his thesis about Posterolateral Knee Injuries.

== Career ==
LaPrade currently practices as an orthopedic surgeon at the Edina and Eagan locations of Twin Cities Orthopedics in Minnesota. As one of the world's most celebrated complex knee surgeons and clinician scientists, Dr. LaPrade has published more than 300 peer-reviewed scientific manuscripts, 100 book chapters, and has given over 1000 professional presentations, symposia, grand rounds, and instructional course lectures. He has received many awards for his research, including the OREF Clinical Research Award, considered a Nobel Prize of Orthopaedics and his research team has been awarded the AOSSM Excellence in Research Award three times since 2009. In addition, he is the most published author in the top cited orthopaedic journal, The American Journal of Sports Medicine (AJSM), with over 115 articles in AJSM alone. He is also the sole author of the only comprehensive textbook on posterolateral knee injuries and has been the editor for several sports medicine textbooks. He is recognized as a pioneer in knee research, with many referrals from international and nationally recognized physicians due to his successful patient outcomes and his development of more effective surgical techniques for the reconstruction of complex knee injuries.

Additionally, he serves on the editorial boards of the American Journal of Sports Medicine and Knee Surgery, Sports Traumatology, Arthroscopy. Dr. LaPrade’s work focuses on clinical practice, research, and education in orthopaedic surgery. He has contributed to the diagnosis and treatment of complex knee injuries, including posterolateral knee injuries, posterior cruciate ligament (PCL) tears, knee dislocations, revision anterior cruciate ligament (ACL) reconstructions, meniscal transplantation, medial collateral ligament (MCL) injuries, knee osteotomies, osteochondral allografts, cartilage restoration procedures, and patellofemoral instability. He has treated athletes at various levels, including professional and collegiate athletes.

Dr. LaPrade has been recognized in listings as "One of the Best Doctors in America" and "One of the Most Compassionate Doctors". His work focuses on sport medicine injuries and he is known for his specialized surgical practices in knee reconstruction. As a clinical scientist, he has applied extensive research in sports medicine pathology to develop new surgical approaches for complex knee conditions. Several procedures he developed have been adopted internationally and are widely used in the treatment of knee injuries.

Dr. LaPrade is also recognized for his contributions to surgical education. He founded the Vail International Complex Knee Course, which has attracted sports medicine surgeons from around the world to observe his clinical examinations and surgical techniques. He has received multiple teaching awards, including three annual awards from fellows in the Steadman Clinic Sports Medicine Fellowship program.

=== Hockey ===
Additionally, he writes the "Hockey Doc" section of the Let's Play Hockey magazine, contributing articles about hockey injury prevention and treatment. LaPrade has treated injured athletes in all levels of competition, including professional and Olympic athletes, and was team physician for the University of Minnesota men's ice hockey team when they won two National Championships.
