= La Brousse =

- Commune
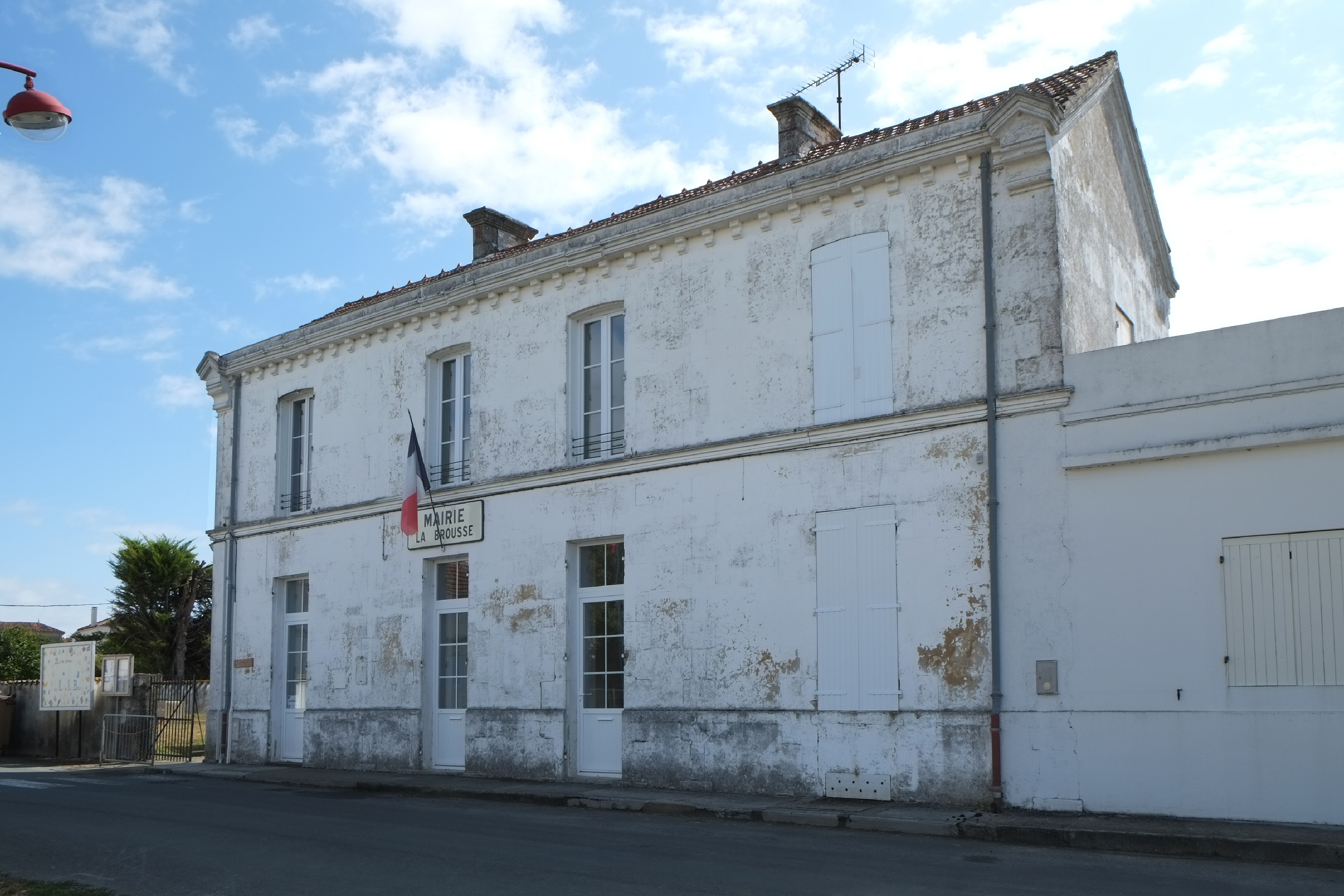
- The town hall in La Brousse
- Location of La Brousse
- Location within France Location within Nouvelle-Aquitaine
- Coordinates: 45°53′24″N 0°21′46″W
- Country: France
- Region: Nouvelle-Aquitaine
- Department: Charente-Maritime
- Arrondissement: Saint-Jean-d'Angély
- Canton: Matha

Government
  - Mayor (2020–2026): Serge Bernet
- Area^{1}: 18.84 km^{2} (7.27 sq mi)
- Elevation: 45 m (148 ft)
- Highest elevation: 78 m (256 ft)
- Lowest elevation: 34 m (112 ft)
- Population (2023): 516
  - Density: 27.4/km^{2} (70.9/sq mi)
- Time zone: UTC+01:00 (CET)
  - Summer (DST): UTC+02:00 (CEST)
- INSEE/Postal code: 17071 /17160
- ^{1} French Land Register data, which excludes lakes, ponds, glaciers > 1 km^{2} (0.386 sq mi or 247 acres) and river estuaries.

La Brousse (French pronunciation: [la bʁus]) is a commune in the Charente-Maritime department in the Nouvelle-Aquitaine region in southwestern France.

== Population ==
Historical population
Year	Pop.	±% p.a.
1968	576	—
1975	569	−0.17%
1982	530	−1.01%
1990	520	−0.24%
1999	477	−0.95%
2007	502	+0.64%
2012	521	+0.75%
2017	509	−0.46%
2023	516	+0.23%
Source: INSEE

== See also ==
- Communes of the Charente-Maritime department
