= Roumégoux, Tarn =

Roumégoux
- Part of Terre-de-Bancalié
- Coat of arms
- Location of Roumégoux
- Location within France Location within Occitanie
- Coordinates: 43°48′14″N 2°15′43″E
- Country: France
- Region: Occitania
- Department: Tarn
- Arrondissement: Albi
- Canton: Le Haut Dadou
- Commune: Terre-de-Bancalié
- Area^{1}: 13.43 km^{2} (5.19 sq mi)
- Elevation: 350 m (1,150 ft)
- Highest elevation: 390 m (1,280 ft)
- Lowest elevation: 249 m (817 ft)
- Population (2022): 248
  - Density: 18.5/km^{2} (47.8/sq mi)
- Time zone: UTC+01:00 (CET)
  - Summer (DST): UTC+02:00 (CEST)
- Postal code: 81120
- ^{1} French Land Register data, which excludes lakes, ponds, glaciers > 1 km^{2} (0.386 sq mi or 247 acres) and river estuaries.

Roumégoux (French pronunciation: [ʁumeɡu]; Languedocien: Romegós, meaning (land of the) brambles) is a former commune in the Tarn department in southern France. On 1 January 2019, it was merged into the new commune Terre-de-Bancalié.

== See also ==
- Communes of the Tarn department
