= Cuq, Tarn =

Cuq
- Commune
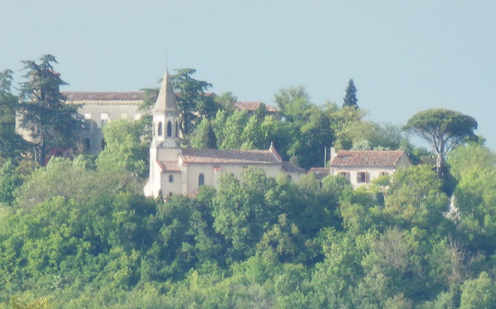
- The church in Cuq

- Coat of arms
- Location of Cuq
- Location within France Location within Occitanie
- Coordinates: 43°38′55″N 2°05′38″E
- Country: France
- Region: Occitania
- Department: Tarn
- Arrondissement: Castres
- Canton: Plaine de l'Agoût
- Intercommunality: Lautrécois-Pays d'Agout

Government
  - Mayor (2020–2026): Christian Montagné
- Area^{1}: 14.99 km^{2} (5.79 sq mi)
- Elevation: 200 m (660 ft)
- Highest elevation: 322 m (1,056 ft)
- Lowest elevation: 152 m (499 ft)
- Population (2023): 482
  - Density: 32.2/km^{2} (83.3/sq mi)
- Time zone: UTC+01:00 (CET)
  - Summer (DST): UTC+02:00 (CEST)
- INSEE/Postal code: 81075 /81570
- ^{1} French Land Register data, which excludes lakes, ponds, glaciers > 1 km^{2} (0.386 sq mi or 247 acres) and river estuaries.

Cuq (French pronunciation: [kyk]; Occitan: Cuc, meaning dark) is a commune in the Tarn department in southern France.

== See also ==
- Communes of the Tarn department
