= Viterbe, Tarn =

Viterbe
- Commune
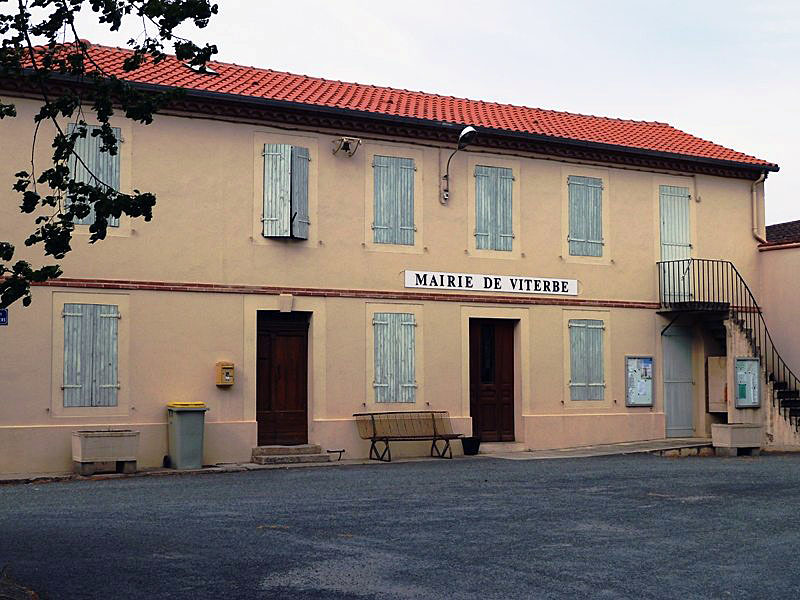
- Viterbe Town hall

- Coat of arms
- Location of Viterbe
- Location within France Location within Occitanie
- Coordinates: 43°40′43″N 1°55′51″E
- Country: France
- Region: Occitania
- Department: Tarn
- Arrondissement: Castres
- Canton: Plaine de l'Agoût
- Intercommunality: Lautrécois-Pays d'Agout

Government
  - Mayor (2020–2026): Martine Kazimierczak
- Area^{1}: 6.51 km^{2} (2.51 sq mi)
- Elevation: 140 m (460 ft)
- Highest elevation: 162 m (531 ft)
- Lowest elevation: 119 m (390 ft)
- Population (2023): 361
  - Density: 55.5/km^{2} (144/sq mi)
- Time zone: UTC+01:00 (CET)
  - Summer (DST): UTC+02:00 (CEST)
- INSEE/Postal code: 81323 /81220
- ^{1} French Land Register data, which excludes lakes, ponds, glaciers > 1 km^{2} (0.386 sq mi or 247 acres) and river estuaries.

Viterbe (French pronunciation: [vitɛʁb]; Occitan: Vitèrba) is a commune in the Tarn department in southern France.

The closest airport to Viterbe is Toulouse Airport (47 km).

== See also ==
- Communes of the Tarn department
