= Prade =

Prade Prada
- Location in Slovenia
- Coordinates: 45°32′17.64″N 13°46′29.84″E
- Country: Slovenia
- Traditional region: Littoral
- Statistical region: Coastal–Karst
- Municipality: Koper

Area
  - Total: 1.03 km^{2} (0.40 sq mi)
- Elevation: 71.9 m (236 ft)

Population (2002)
  - Total: 946

Prade (pronounced [ˈpɾaːdɛ]; Italian: Prada, Prade) is a settlement east of Koper in the Littoral region of Slovenia.

== History ==
Prade was a hamlet of Bertoki until 1989, when it was administratively separated and made a settlement in its own right.
