= Anne Veaute =

French textile manufacturer

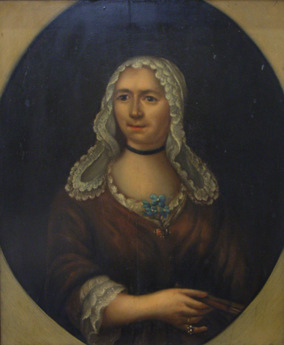
- Portrait of Anne Veaute
- Born: 1725; Brassac, Tarn, France
- Died: 1794 (aged 68–69); Castres, France
- Occupation: Textile manufacturer
- Known for: Starting a Textile Business in Castres.

Anne Veaute (1725-1794) was a French textile manufacturer. She created a woollen fabric production company in Castres in the 18th century. Her company gained recognition in producing such types of fabric as cuirs-laine, casimirs and castorines.

== Early life and career ==
Veaute was born in 1725 in Brassac, Tarn, to a Protestant family engaged in textile manufacture and trade. In 1744, she married Jacques Guibal and bore him five children. During her husband's service in the army in Chartres, she managed their family and participated in textile production.

Various dates of her birth have been indicated throughout history. Thus, according to an article of La Dépêche du Midi published in 2009, she was born in 1725, but there are also some dates assumed, including 1716 and 1717.

=== Textile business ===
In 1756, Veaute started to produce woollen cloth in Castres. As mentioned in the historical profile posted at the Museum of Protestantism, she borrowed money and bought two bales of wool for production and got them processed. Then, she invested all of the money into the company and created her own factory in proximity to the Agout, creating several stages of textile production.

The firm was referred to as the house of Anne Veaute and her sons. She engaged her sons Jean and Louis into the business, which gained a name locally and regionally. The firm offered a variety of products including cuirs-laine, woollen fabrics called casimirs used for making waistcoats, and castorines, which are light and silky woollen fabrics.

In an article published in 2009 in the publication “La Dépêche du Midi,” Veaute was portrayed as a renowned person in the textile industry in Castres, and it was mentioned that her firm had attained a leading position due to her products.

=== Succession and later developments ===
Veaute retired from business in 1790 and passed away in Castres in 1794. The business was carried on by her sons, and subsequent generations.

According to the Museum of Protestantism’s historical record, the introduction of mechanical processes for spinning cotton yarns and carding wool was credited to her son, instead of Veaute. Subsequent industrial development is linked to her grandson, Louis-David Guibal-Anneveaute (1781-1849).

== Legacy ==
The connection between Veaute and the establishment of textile production in Castres in the 18th century has been recognized through the displays and publications dealing with the industrial and social history of the region. An exhibition that took place in 2019 in the Centre national et musée Jean-Jaurès under the name Le textile à Castres, d'Anne Veaute à nos jours was dedicated to the history of textile production in the city starting from Veaute's business.
