= Alquier =

Alquier is a surname. Notable people with the surname include:

- Charles-Jean-Marie Alquier (1752–1826), French diplomat
- Jacqueline Alquier (born 1947), French politician
