= Gijou =

River in southern France

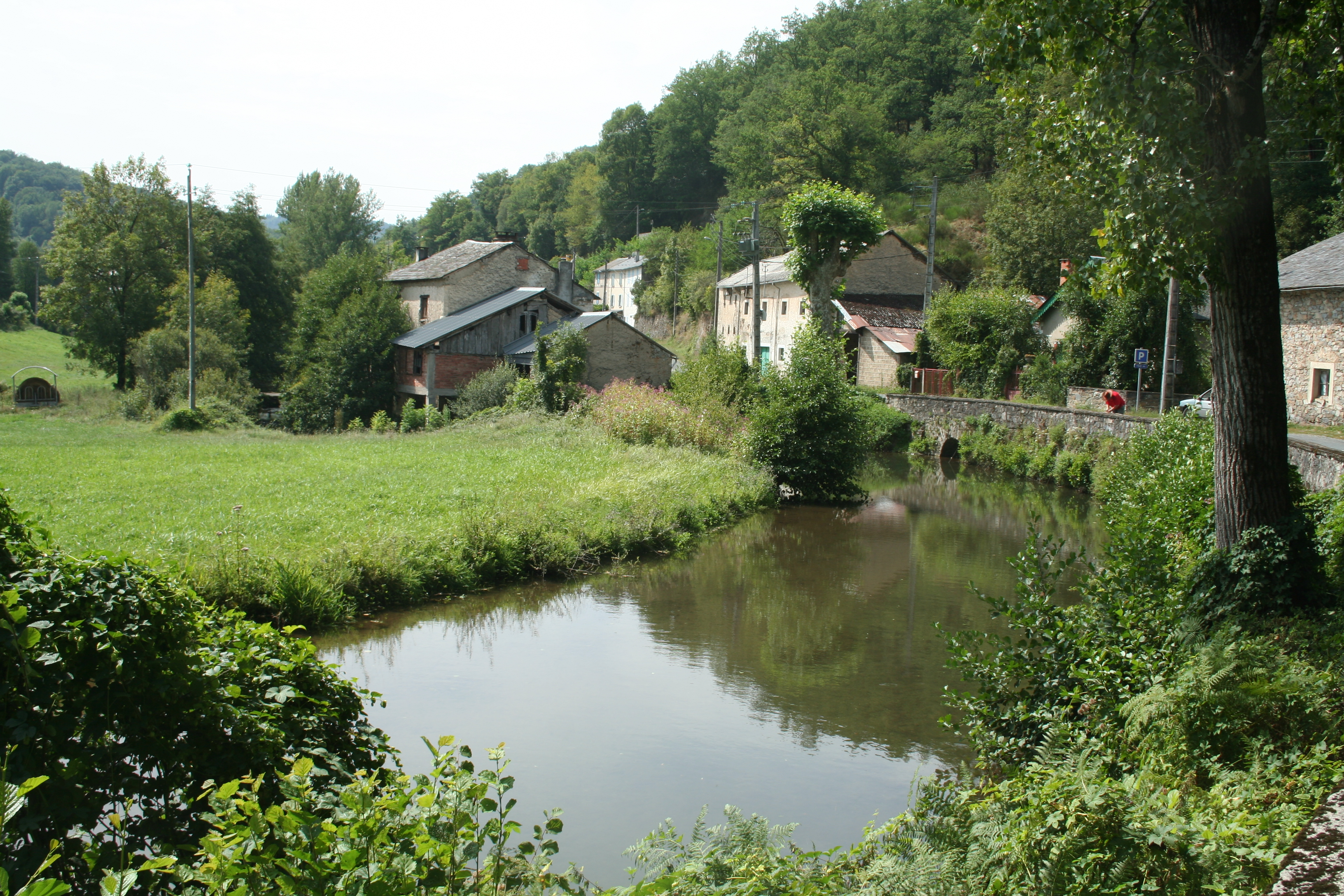

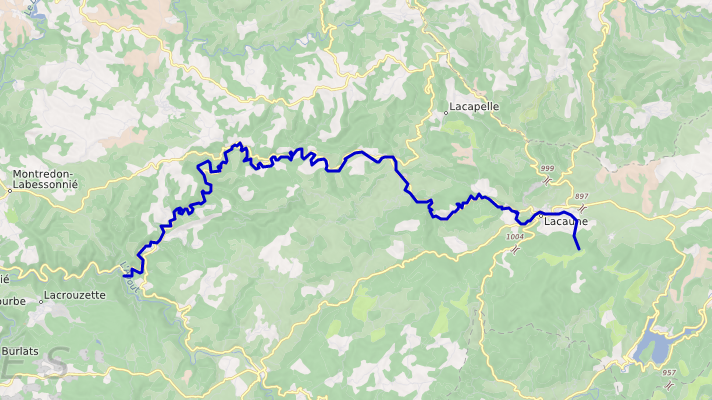

Location
- Country: France

Physical characteristics
- Source
  - location: Lacaune
  - coordinates: 43°42′33″N 02°40′26″E
  - elevation: 745 m (2,444 ft)
- Mouth
  - location: Agout
  - coordinates: 43°40′41″N 02°24′18″E
  - elevation: 285 m (935 ft)
- Length: 50.0 km (31.1 mi)
- Basin size: 208 km^{2} (80 sq mi)
- Discharge
  - average: 4.63 m^{3}/s (164 cu ft/s)

Basin features
- Progression: Agout→ Tarn→ Garonne→ Gironde estuary→ Atlantic Ocean

The Gijou (French pronunciation: [ʒiʒu]) is a 50.0 km (31.1 mi) long river in the Tarn department in southern France. Its source is at Lacaune. It flows generally west-southwest. It is a right tributary of the Agout, into which it flows at Vabre.

== Communes along its course ==
This list is ordered from source to mouth: Lacaune, Gijounet, Viane, Lacaze, Saint-Pierre-de-Trivisy, Vabre
