= Lacaune =

- Commune
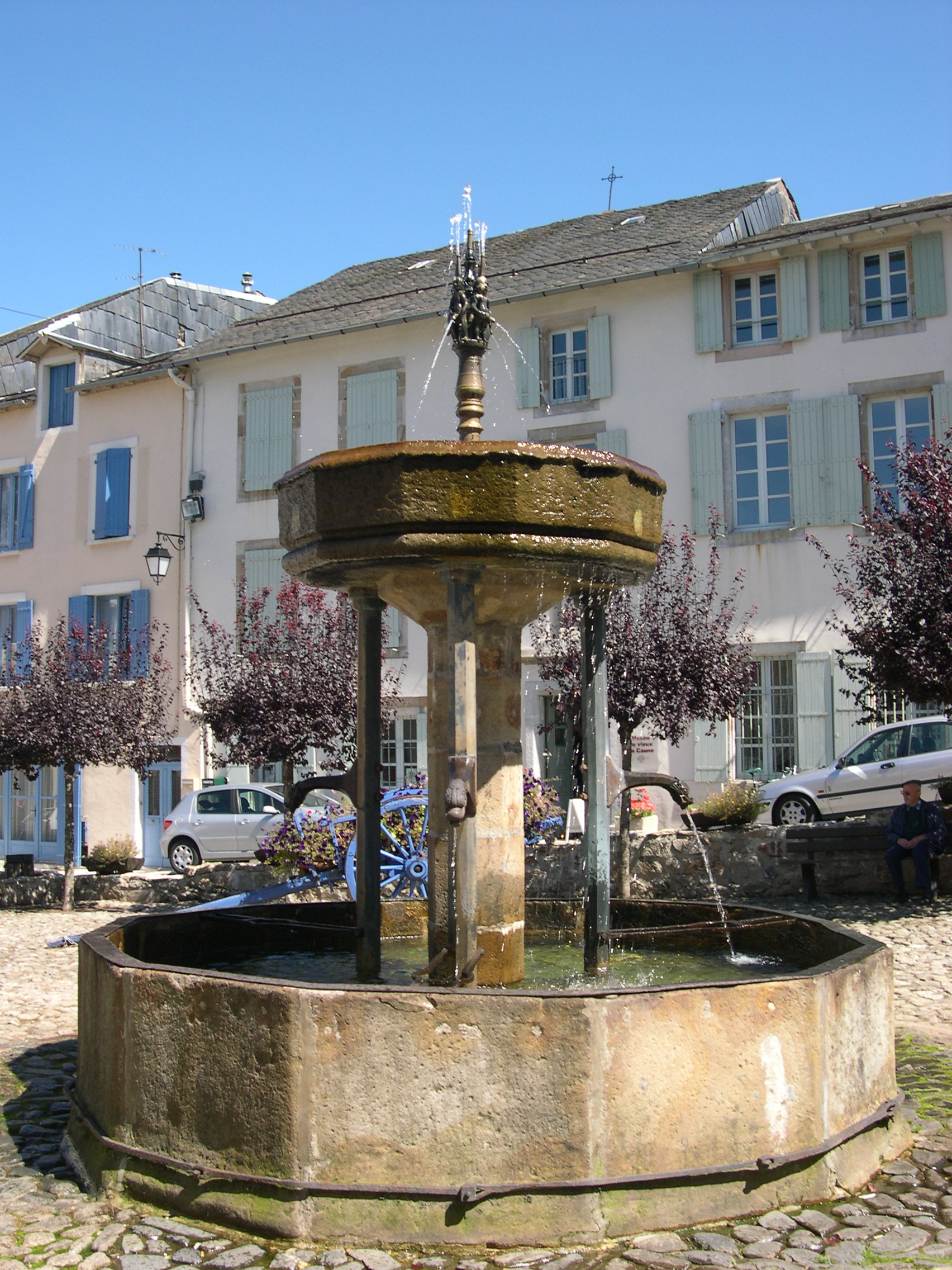
- The fountain in Lacaune

- Coat of arms
- Location of Lacaune
- Location within France Location within Occitanie
- Coordinates: 43°42′34″N 2°41′35″E
- Country: France
- Region: Occitania
- Department: Tarn
- Arrondissement: Castres
- Canton: Les Hautes Terres d'Oc
- Intercommunality: CC du Haut-Languedoc

Government
  - Mayor (2020–2026): Robert Bousquet
- Area^{1}: 91.36 km^{2} (35.27 sq mi)
- Elevation: 800 m (2,600 ft)
- Highest elevation: 1,274 m (4,180 ft)
- Lowest elevation: 598 m (1,962 ft)
- Population (2023): 2,464
  - Density: 26.97/km^{2} (69.85/sq mi)
- Time zone: UTC+01:00 (CET)
  - Summer (DST): UTC+02:00 (CEST)
- INSEE/Postal code: 81124 /81230
- ^{1} French Land Register data, which excludes lakes, ponds, glaciers > 1 km^{2} (0.386 sq mi or 247 acres) and river estuaries.

Lacaune (French pronunciation: [lakon]; Languedocien: La Cauna, meaning the cave) is a commune in the Tarn department in southern France.

== Geography ==
The river Gijou has its source in the commune.

== History ==
In 1797, the feral child Victor of Aveyron was looked after at Lacaune for a week after first being discovered in the woods, before running away.

== Population ==
Historical population
Year	Pop.	±% p.a.
1968	3,184	—
1975	3,260	+0.34%
1982	3,231	−0.13%
1990	3,089	−0.56%
1999	2,914	−0.65%
2007	2,763	−0.66%
2012	2,552	−1.58%
2017	2,492	−0.47%
2023	2,464	−0.19%
Source: INSEE

Its inhabitants are called Lacaunais in French and Cauneses in Occitan.

== Points of interest ==
- Arboretum de Calmels

== See also ==
- Communes of the Tarn department
- Tourism in Tarn
