= Lasfaillades =

- Commune
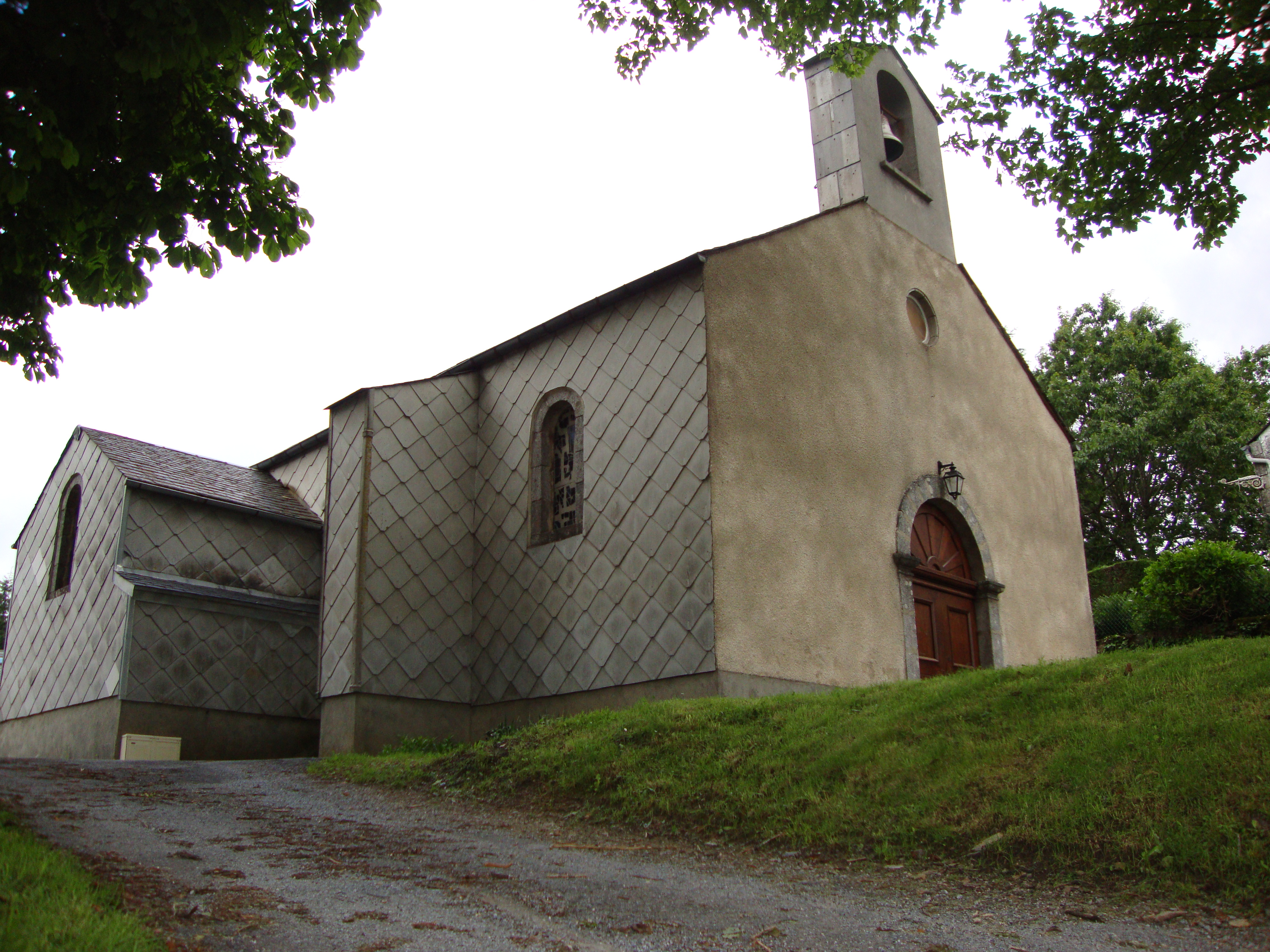
- Bouisset church, in Lasfaillades
- Location of Lasfaillades
- Location within France Location within Occitanie
- Coordinates: 43°34′33″N 2°29′40″E
- Country: France
- Region: Occitania
- Department: Tarn
- Arrondissement: Castres
- Canton: Les Hautes Terres d'Oc

Government
  - Mayor (2020–2026): Brigitte Pailhé-Fernandez
- Area^{1}: 8.32 km^{2} (3.21 sq mi)
- Elevation: 750 m (2,460 ft)
- Highest elevation: 826 m (2,710 ft)
- Lowest elevation: 668 m (2,192 ft)
- Population (2023): 84
  - Density: 10/km^{2} (26/sq mi)
- Time zone: UTC+01:00 (CET)
  - Summer (DST): UTC+02:00 (CEST)
- INSEE/Postal code: 81137 /81260
- ^{1} French Land Register data, which excludes lakes, ponds, glaciers > 1 km^{2} (0.386 sq mi or 247 acres) and river estuaries.

Lasfaillades (French pronunciation: [lasfajad]; Occitan: Las Falhadas) is a commune in the Tarn department in southern France.

== See also ==
- Communes of the Tarn department
