= Lamontélarié =

- Commune
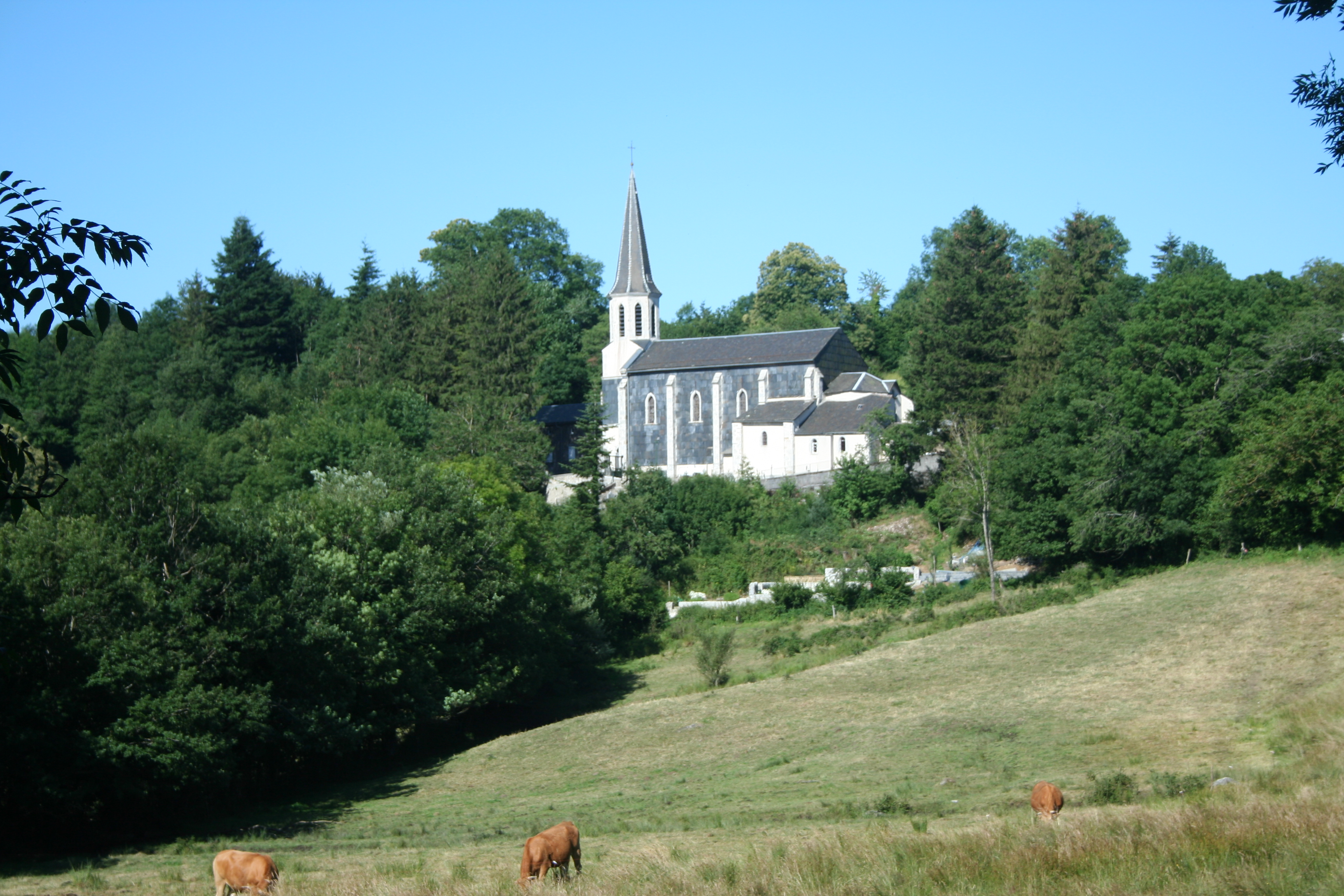
- The church and surroundings in Lamontélarié
- Location of Lamontélarié
- Location within France Location within Occitanie
- Coordinates: 43°37′29″N 2°36′11″E
- Country: France
- Region: Occitania
- Department: Tarn
- Arrondissement: Castres
- Canton: Les Hautes Terres d'Oc
- Intercommunality: CC du Haut-Languedoc

Government
  - Mayor (2020–2026): Pierre Escande
- Area^{1}: 21.58 km^{2} (8.33 sq mi)
- Elevation: 830 m (2,720 ft)
- Highest elevation: 1,111 m (3,645 ft)
- Lowest elevation: 600 m (2,000 ft)
- Population (2023): 58
  - Density: 2.7/km^{2} (7.0/sq mi)
- Time zone: UTC+01:00 (CET)
  - Summer (DST): UTC+02:00 (CEST)
- INSEE/Postal code: 81134 /81260
- ^{1} French Land Register data, which excludes lakes, ponds, glaciers > 1 km^{2} (0.386 sq mi or 247 acres) and river estuaries.

Lamontélarié (French pronunciation: [lamɔ̃telaʁje]; Occitan: La Montelariá) is a commune in the Tarn department in southern France.

== Geography ==
Lamontélarié is located at the limits of Hérault on the Monts de Lacaune. It is part of the Haut-Languedoc Regional Nature Park. It is about 1 hour and 35 minutes from Albi Castres.

== See also ==
- Communes of the Tarn department
