= Le Bez =

- Commune
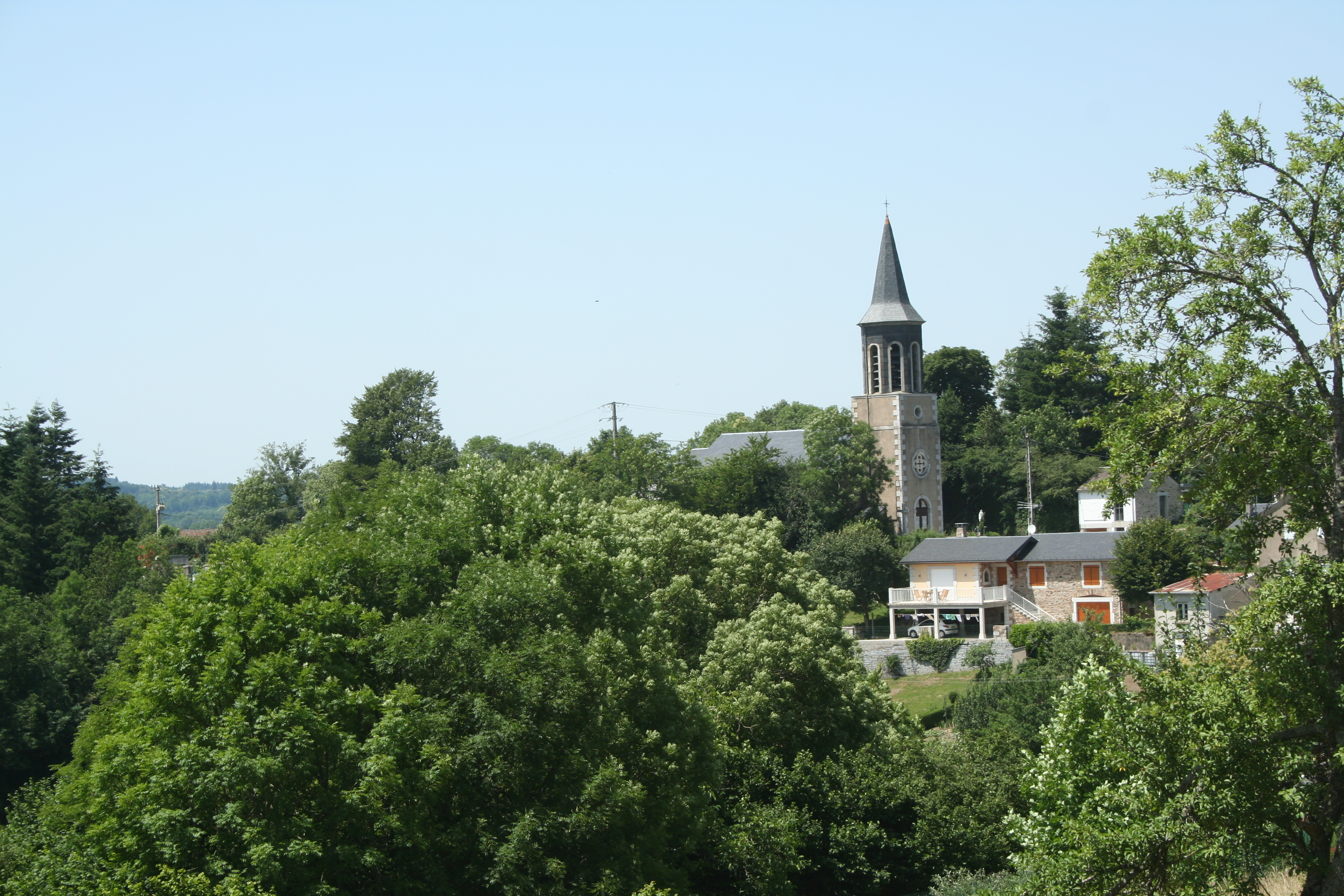
- The church in Le Bez

- Coat of arms
- Location of Le Bez
- Location within France Location within Occitanie
- Coordinates: 43°36′32″N 2°28′37″E
- Country: France
- Region: Occitania
- Department: Tarn
- Arrondissement: Castres
- Canton: Les Hautes Terres d'Oc
- Intercommunality: Sidobre Vals et Plateaux

Government
  - Mayor (2020–2026): Christine Bernot
- Area^{1}: 32.13 km^{2} (12.41 sq mi)
- Elevation: 650 m (2,130 ft)
- Highest elevation: 813 m (2,667 ft)
- Lowest elevation: 353 m (1,158 ft)
- Population (2023): 907
  - Density: 28.2/km^{2} (73.1/sq mi)
- Time zone: UTC+01:00 (CET)
  - Summer (DST): UTC+02:00 (CEST)
- INSEE/Postal code: 81031 /81260
- ^{1} French Land Register data, which excludes lakes, ponds, glaciers > 1 km^{2} (0.386 sq mi or 247 acres) and river estuaries.

Le Bez (Occitan: Lo Bèç, meaning the birch tree) is a commune in the Tarn department in southern France.

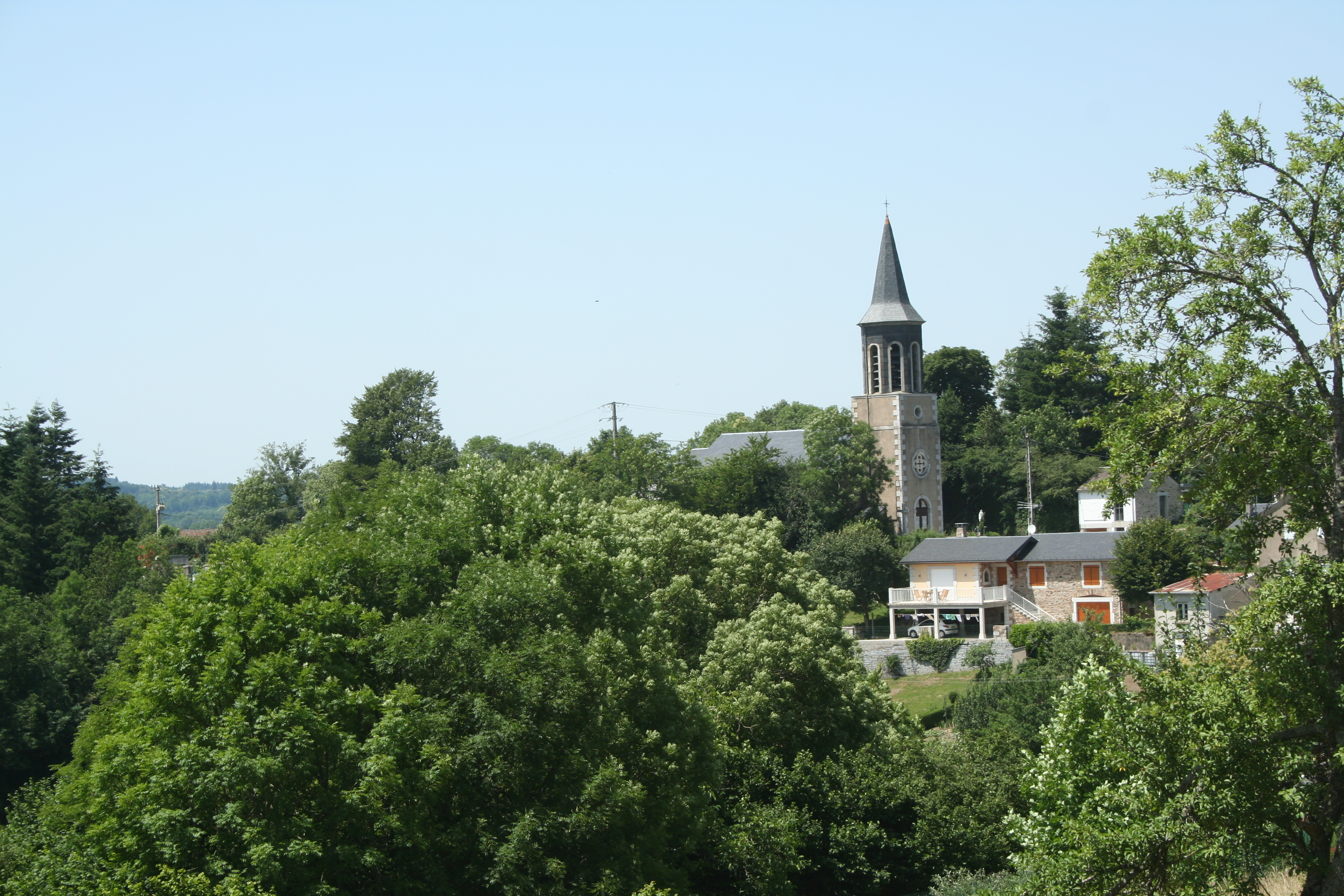
Church

== See also ==
- Communes of the Tarn department
