= Arboretum de Calmels =

Arboretum in Midi-Pyrénées, France

Coordinates: 43.7°N 2.695°E

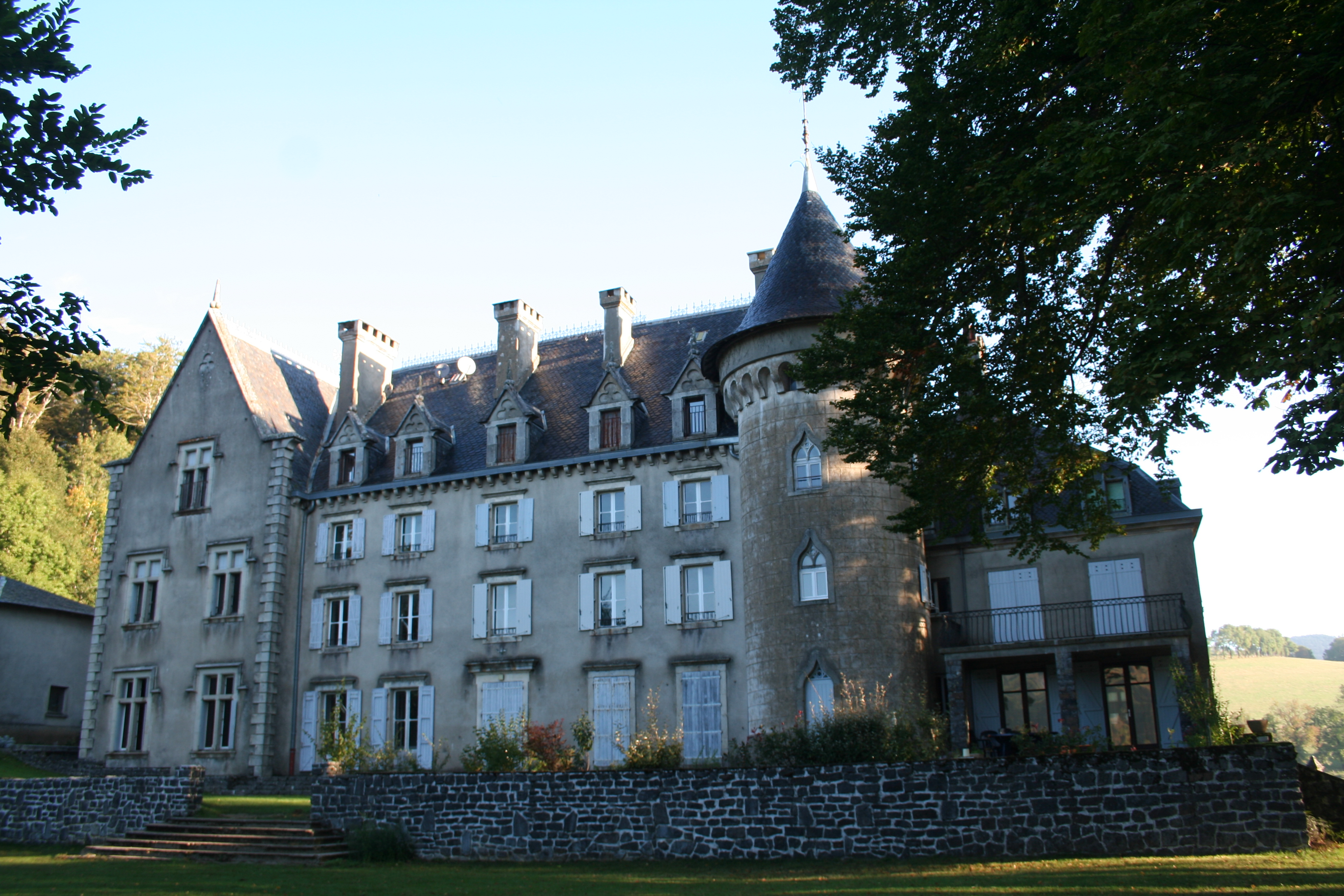
Arboretum de Calmels

The Arboretum de Calmels is a small arboretum located on the grounds of the 19th-century Château de Calmels in Lacaune, Tarn, Midi-Pyrénées, France. It contains regional trees such as Aesculus hippocastanum, Juglans regia, and Pinus strobus, as well as exotics including Larix leptolepis and Sequoiadendron.

== See also ==
- List of botanical gardens in France
