= Lacapelle-Escroux =

- Commune
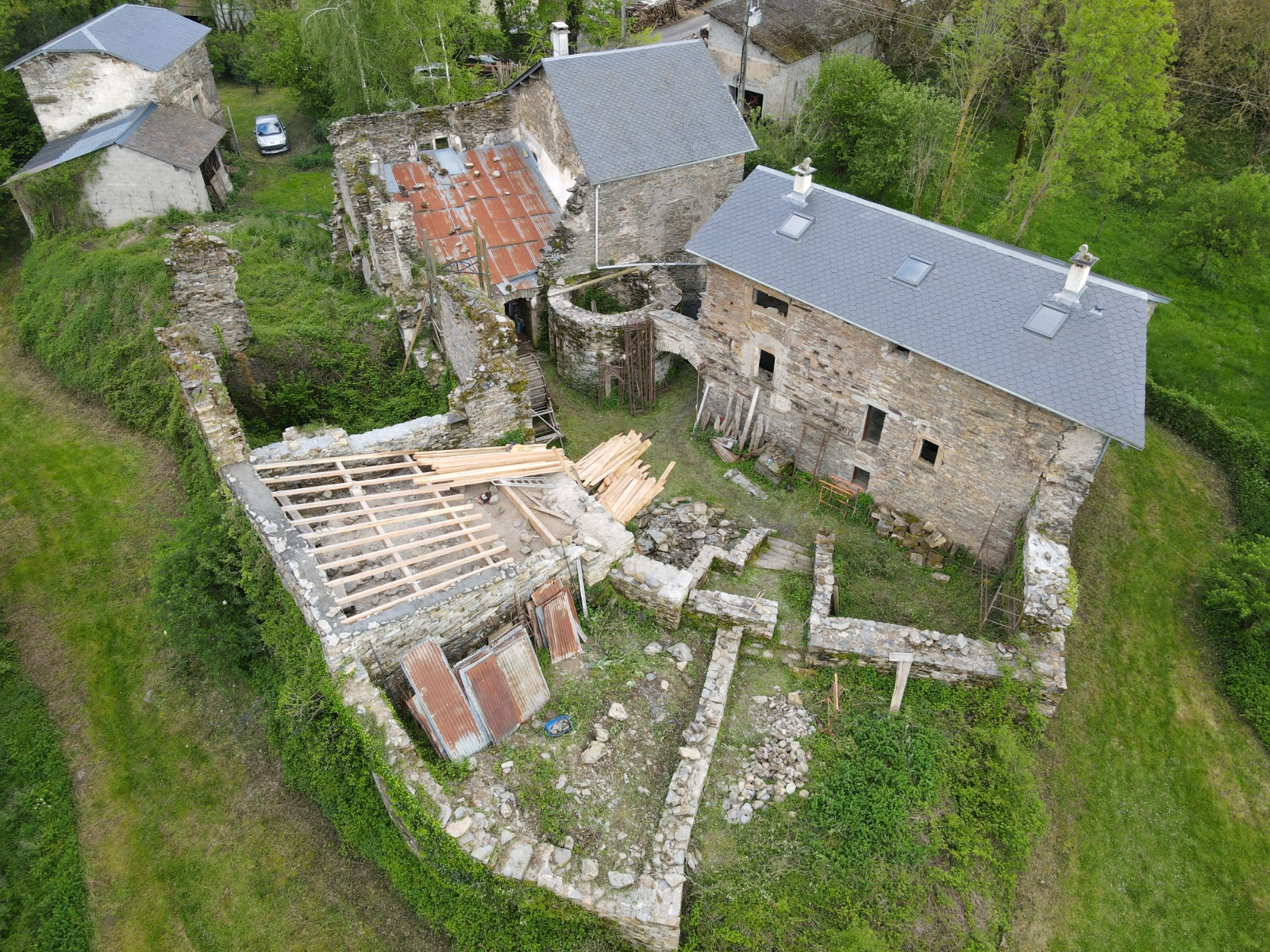

- Coat of arms
- Location of Lacapelle-Escroux
- Location within France Location within Occitanie
- Coordinates: 43°45′33″N 2°37′39″E
- Country: France
- Region: Occitania
- Department: Tarn
- Arrondissement: Castres
- Canton: Les Hautes Terres d'Oc
- Intercommunality: CC du Haut-Languedoc

Government
  - Mayor (2020–2026): Marie José Brousse
- Area^{1}: 10.24 km^{2} (3.95 sq mi)
- Elevation: 730 m (2,400 ft)
- Highest elevation: 906 m (2,972 ft)
- Lowest elevation: 570 m (1,870 ft)
- Population (2023): 48
  - Density: 4.7/km^{2} (12/sq mi)
- Time zone: UTC+01:00 (CET)
  - Summer (DST): UTC+02:00 (CEST)
- INSEE/Postal code: 81085 /81530
- ^{1} French Land Register data, which excludes lakes, ponds, glaciers > 1 km^{2} (0.386 sq mi or 247 acres) and river estuaries.

Lacapelle-Escroux (French pronunciation: [lakapɛl ɛskʁu], known as Escroux until 31 December 2022; Occitan: La Capèla d'Escrós) is a commune in the Tarn department and Occitanie region of southern France.

== See also ==
- Communes of the Tarn department
