= Lacaze =

- Commune
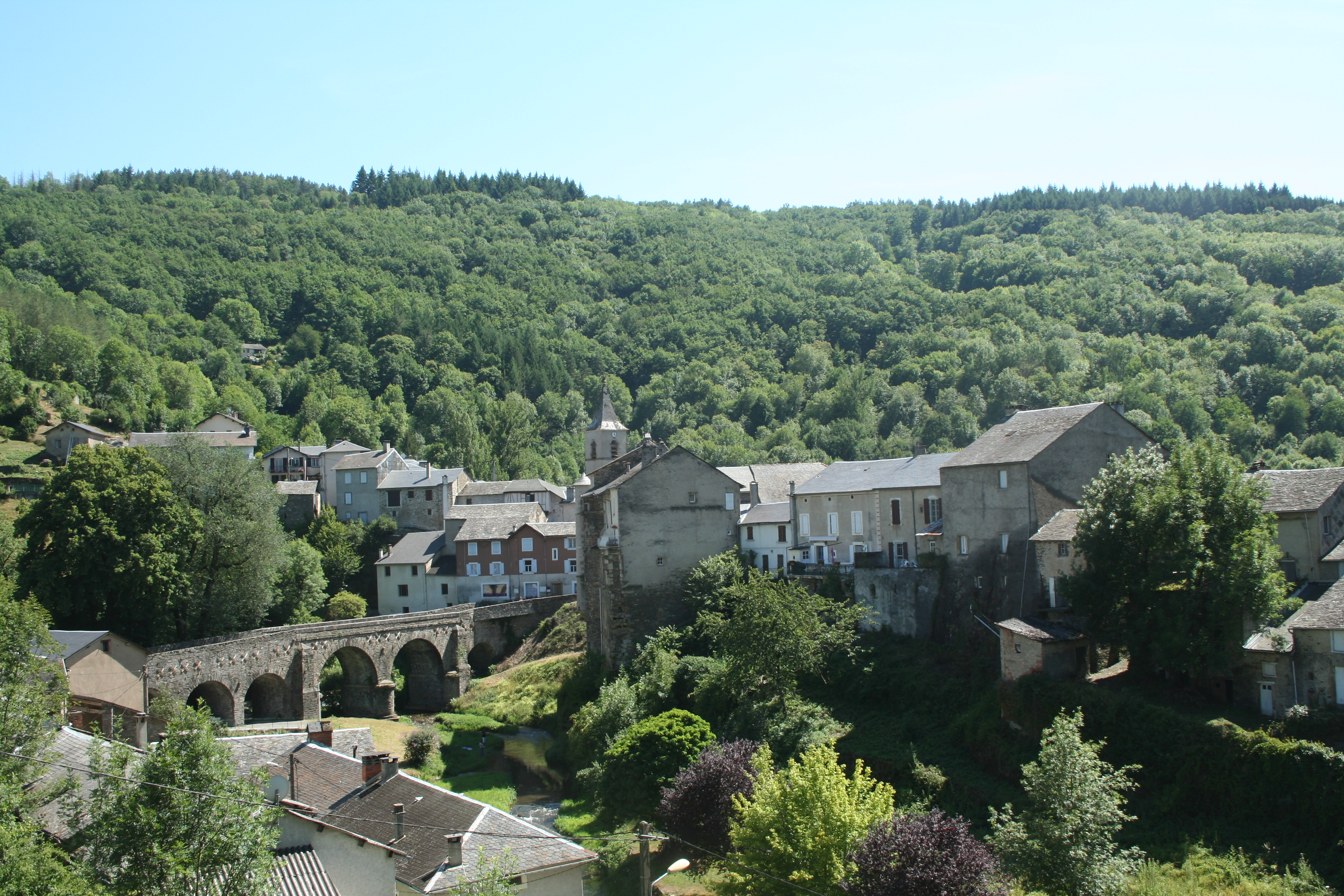
- A general view of Lacaze

- Coat of arms
- Location of Lacaze
- Location within France Location within Occitanie
- Coordinates: 43°44′21″N 2°31′15″E
- Country: France
- Region: Occitania
- Department: Tarn
- Arrondissement: Castres
- Canton: Les Hautes Terres d'Oc

Government
  - Mayor (2020–2026): Alain Ricard
- Area^{1}: 46.16 km^{2} (17.82 sq mi)
- Elevation: 450 m (1,480 ft)
- Highest elevation: 805 m (2,641 ft)
- Lowest elevation: 392 m (1,286 ft)
- Population (2023): 318
  - Density: 6.89/km^{2} (17.8/sq mi)
- Time zone: UTC+01:00 (CET)
  - Summer (DST): UTC+02:00 (CEST)
- INSEE/Postal code: 81125 /81330
- ^{1} French Land Register data, which excludes lakes, ponds, glaciers > 1 km^{2} (0.386 sq mi or 247 acres) and river estuaries.

Lacaze (French pronunciation: [lakaz]; Occitan: La Casa, meaning the house) is a commune in the Tarn department in southern France.

== Geography ==
The river Dadou forms part of the commune's northern border. The village lies on the banks of the Gijou, which flows westward through the commune, then forms most of its south-western border.

== See also ==
- Communes of the Tarn department
