= Espérausses =

- Commune
- Coat of arms
- Location of Espérausses
- Location within France Location within Occitanie
- Coordinates: 43°41′39″N 2°32′05″E
- Country: France
- Region: Occitania
- Department: Tarn
- Arrondissement: Castres
- Canton: Les Hautes Terres d'Oc
- Intercommunality: CC du Haut-Languedoc

Government
  - Mayor (2020–2026): Véronique Armengaud
- Area^{1}: 12.2 km^{2} (4.7 sq mi)
- Elevation: 563 m (1,847 ft)
- Highest elevation: 802 m (2,631 ft)
- Lowest elevation: 473 m (1,552 ft)
- Population (2023): 146
  - Density: 12.0/km^{2} (31.0/sq mi)
- Time zone: UTC+01:00 (CET)
  - Summer (DST): UTC+02:00 (CEST)
- INSEE/Postal code: 81086 /81260
- ^{1} French Land Register data, which excludes lakes, ponds, glaciers > 1 km^{2} (0.386 sq mi or 247 acres) and river estuaries.

Espérausses (French pronunciation: [ɛspeʁos]; Occitan: Esperauças) is a commune in the Tarn department in southern France.

== See also ==
- Communes of the Tarn department
