= Gijounet =

- Commune
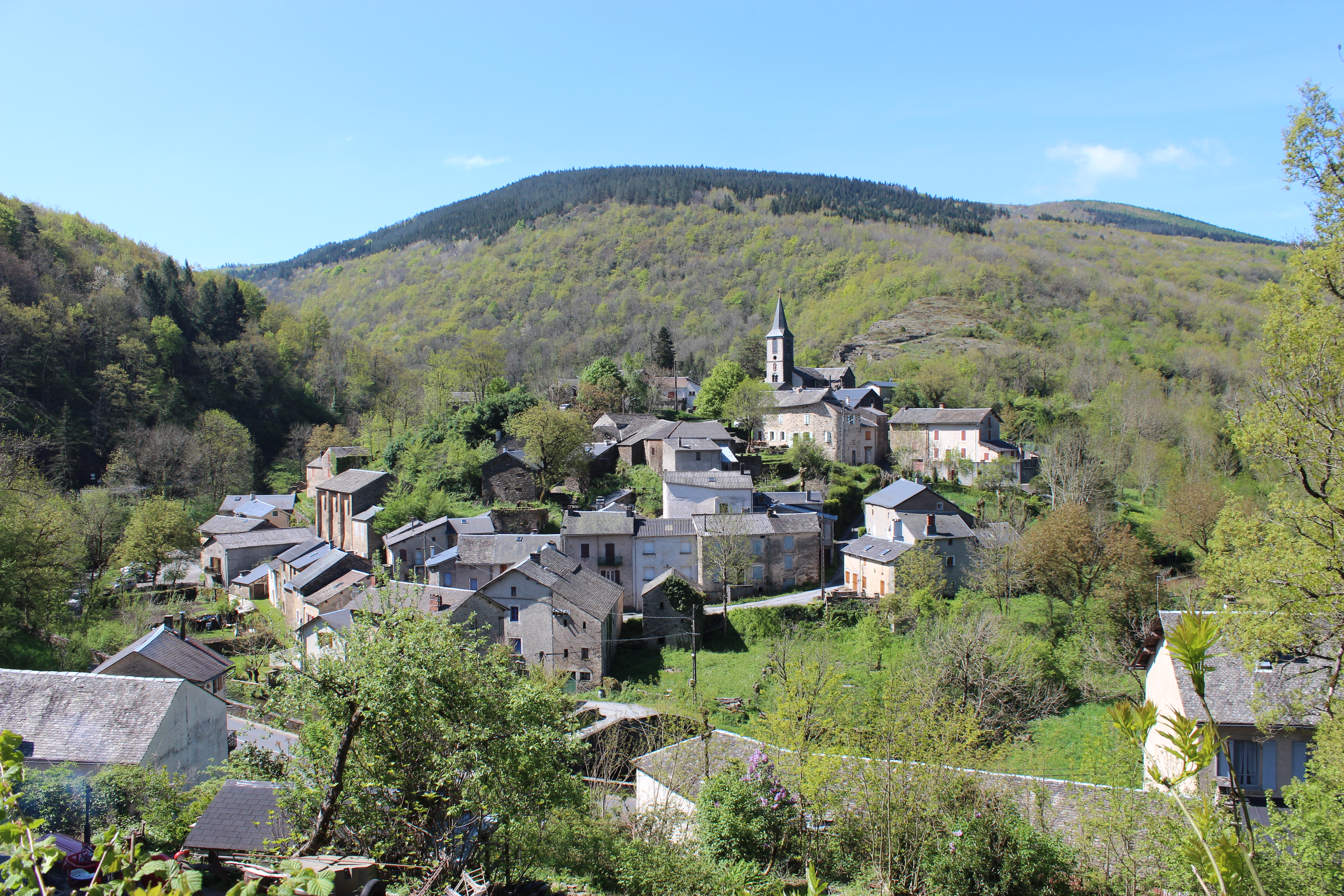
- A general view of Gijounet

- Coat of arms
- Location of Gijounet
- Location within France Location within Occitanie
- Coordinates: 43°42′55″N 2°36′59″E
- Country: France
- Region: Occitania
- Department: Tarn
- Arrondissement: Castres
- Canton: Les Hautes Terres d'Oc
- Intercommunality: CC du Haut-Languedoc

Government
  - Mayor (2020–2026): André Cabrol
- Area^{1}: 15.13 km^{2} (5.84 sq mi)
- Elevation: 550 m (1,800 ft)
- Highest elevation: 1,060 m (3,480 ft)
- Lowest elevation: 530 m (1,740 ft)
- Population (2023): 115
  - Density: 7.60/km^{2} (19.7/sq mi)
- Time zone: UTC+01:00 (CET)
  - Summer (DST): UTC+02:00 (CEST)
- INSEE/Postal code: 81103 /81530
- ^{1} French Land Register data, which excludes lakes, ponds, glaciers > 1 km^{2} (0.386 sq mi or 247 acres) and river estuaries.

Gijounet (French pronunciation: [ʒiʒunɛ]; Occitan: Gijonet) is a commune in the Tarn department in southern France.

== Geography ==
The river Gijou forms part of the commune's north-eastern border, then flows northwestward through the northern part of the commune.

== See also ==
- Communes of the Tarn department
