= Jacqueline Alquier =

French politician

Senator, French Senate
- In office 26 September 2004 – Incumbent
- Constituency: Tarn

Councillor, Regional Council of Midi-Pyrenees
- Constituency: Tarn

Personal details
- Born: July 29, 1947 (age 78) Vabre, France
- Party: Socialist

Jacqueline Lucienne Alquier (née Bardou; born 29 July 1947) is a French politician. She is a senator in the Senate of France, representing the Tarn department. She is a member of the Socialist Party. She is also a councillor on the Regional Council of Midi-Pyrénées, representing the Tarn department. From 1985 to 1986 and 1988 to 1993, she was a Deputy representing Tarn in the National Assembly.

== Early life ==
Alquier was born on 29 July 1947 in Vabre, Tarn, France. Her parents were Emile Bardou and Julia Bardou (née Loup). She married André Alquier in 1968, the same year that she got a job as a secretary.

== Political career ==
Alquier became a deputy mayor in 1977 and departmental councillor for 1979 for Labruguière. She served as the vice chair of the Departmental Council for Tarn between 1982 and 1985.

Remaining chief magistrate and general councillor, she lost the mayoralty in 1995 and gave up her departmental mandate to return to the regional hemicycle, where she chairs the environment and tourism commission.

On September 26, 2004, she became senator for the Tarn department following a break-up of the right-wing party, a position she held until 2014. In the upper house, she is a member of the Social Affairs Committee.

== Bibliography ==
- Page on the Senate website
