= Senaux =

- Commune
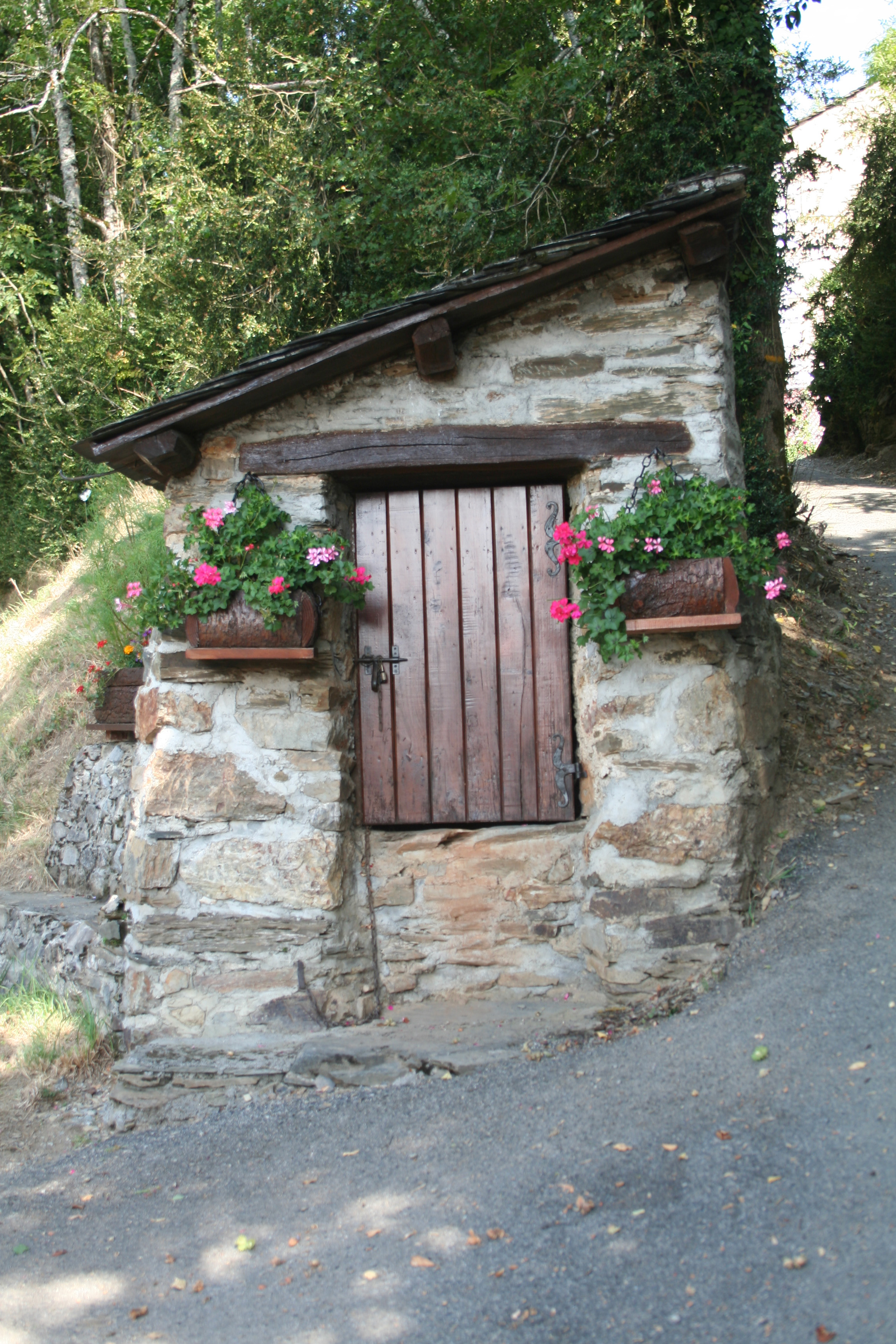
- The Senaux well

- Coat of arms
- Location of Senaux
- Location within France Location within Occitanie
- Coordinates: 43°45′31″N 2°37′08″E
- Country: France
- Region: Occitania
- Department: Tarn
- Arrondissement: Castres
- Canton: Les Hautes Terres d'Oc
- Intercommunality: CC du Haut-Languedoc
- Area^{1}: 4.73 km^{2} (1.83 sq mi)
- Elevation: 600 m (2,000 ft)
- Highest elevation: 896 m (2,940 ft)
- Lowest elevation: 551 m (1,808 ft)
- Population (2023): 39
  - Density: 8.2/km^{2} (21/sq mi)
- Time zone: UTC+01:00 (CET)
  - Summer (DST): UTC+02:00 (CEST)
- INSEE/Postal code: 81282 /81530
- ^{1} French Land Register data, which excludes lakes, ponds, glaciers > 1 km^{2} (0.386 sq mi or 247 acres) and river estuaries.

Senaux is a commune in the Tarn department in southern France.

== See also ==
- Communes of the Tarn department
