= Cambounès =

- Commune
- Coat of arms
- Location of Cambounès
- Location within France Location within Occitanie
- Coordinates: 43°35′14″N 2°26′28″E
- Country: France
- Region: Occitania
- Department: Tarn
- Arrondissement: Castres
- Canton: Les Hautes Terres d'Oc
- Intercommunality: Sidobre Vals et Plateaux

Government
  - Mayor (2020–2026): Jean-Marie Dessens
- Area^{1}: 22.58 km^{2} (8.72 sq mi)
- Elevation: 510 m (1,670 ft)
- Highest elevation: 785 m (2,575 ft)
- Lowest elevation: 333 m (1,093 ft)
- Population (2023): 339
  - Density: 15.0/km^{2} (38.9/sq mi)
- Time zone: UTC+01:00 (CET)
  - Summer (DST): UTC+02:00 (CEST)
- INSEE/Postal code: 81053 /81260
- ^{1} French Land Register data, which excludes lakes, ponds, glaciers > 1 km^{2} (0.386 sq mi or 247 acres) and river estuaries.

Cambounès (French pronunciation: [kɑ̃bunɛs]; Occitan: Cambonés, [kamˈbunes]) is a commune in the Tarn department, Occitania, southern France.

== See also ==
- Communes of the Tarn department
