= Agout =

River in southern France

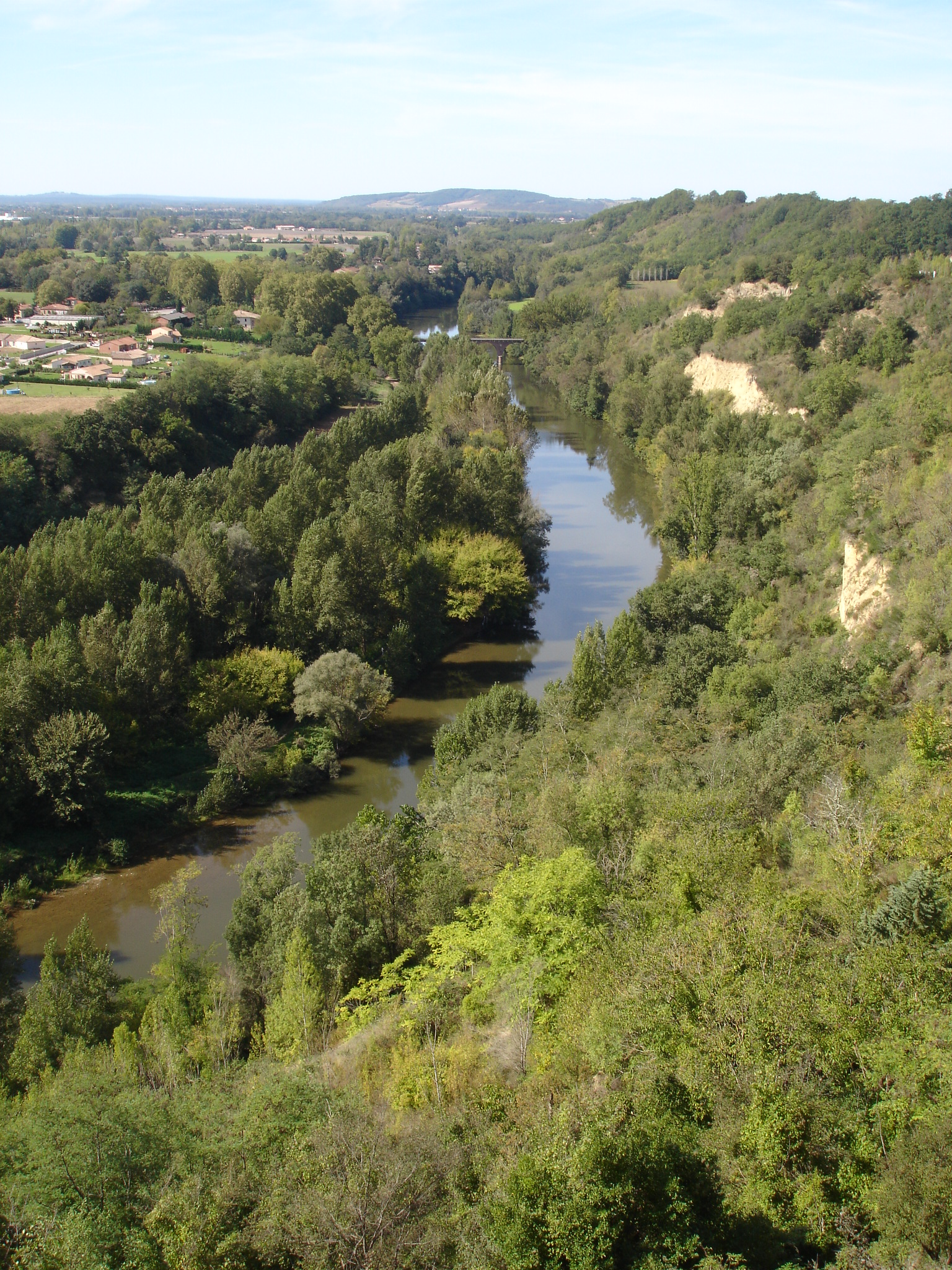

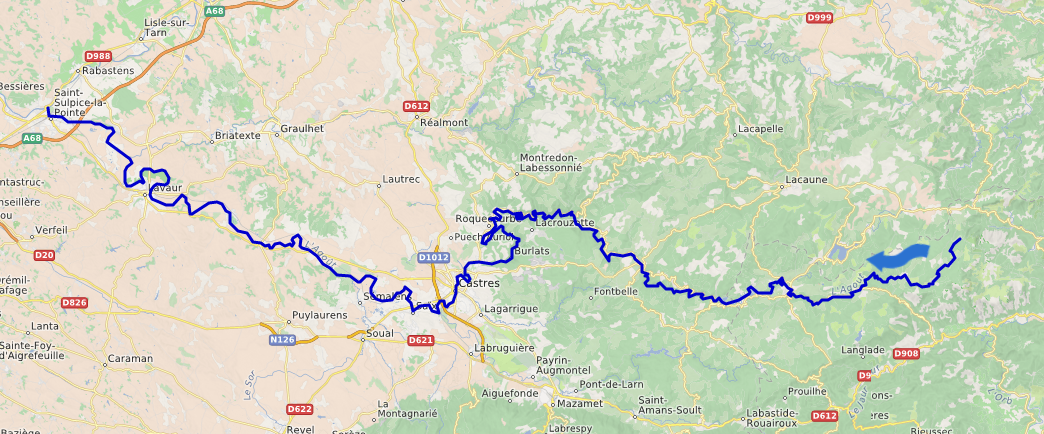

Location
- Country: France

Physical characteristics
- Source
  - location: Massif Central
- Mouth
  - location: Tarn
  - coordinates: 43°47′4″N 1°41′1″E
- Length: 194.4 km (120.8 mi)
- Basin size: 3,500 km^{2} (1,400 mi^{2})
- Discharge
  - average: 55 m^{3}/s (1,900 cu ft/s)

Basin features
- Progression: Tarn→ Garonne→ Gironde estuary→ Atlantic Ocean

The Agout or Agoût (French pronunciation: [aɡu(t)]; Occitan: Agot) is a 194.4-kilometre (120.8 mi) long river in south-western France. It is a left tributary of the Tarn. Its source is in the southern Massif Central, in the Haut-Languedoc Regional Nature Park. It flows generally west through the following department and towns:

- Hérault: La Salvetat-sur-Agout
- Tarn: Brassac, Castres, Lavaur, Saint-Sulpice

The Agout flows into the Tarn at Saint-Sulpice.

Among its tributaries are the Dadou, the Gijou and the Thoré.

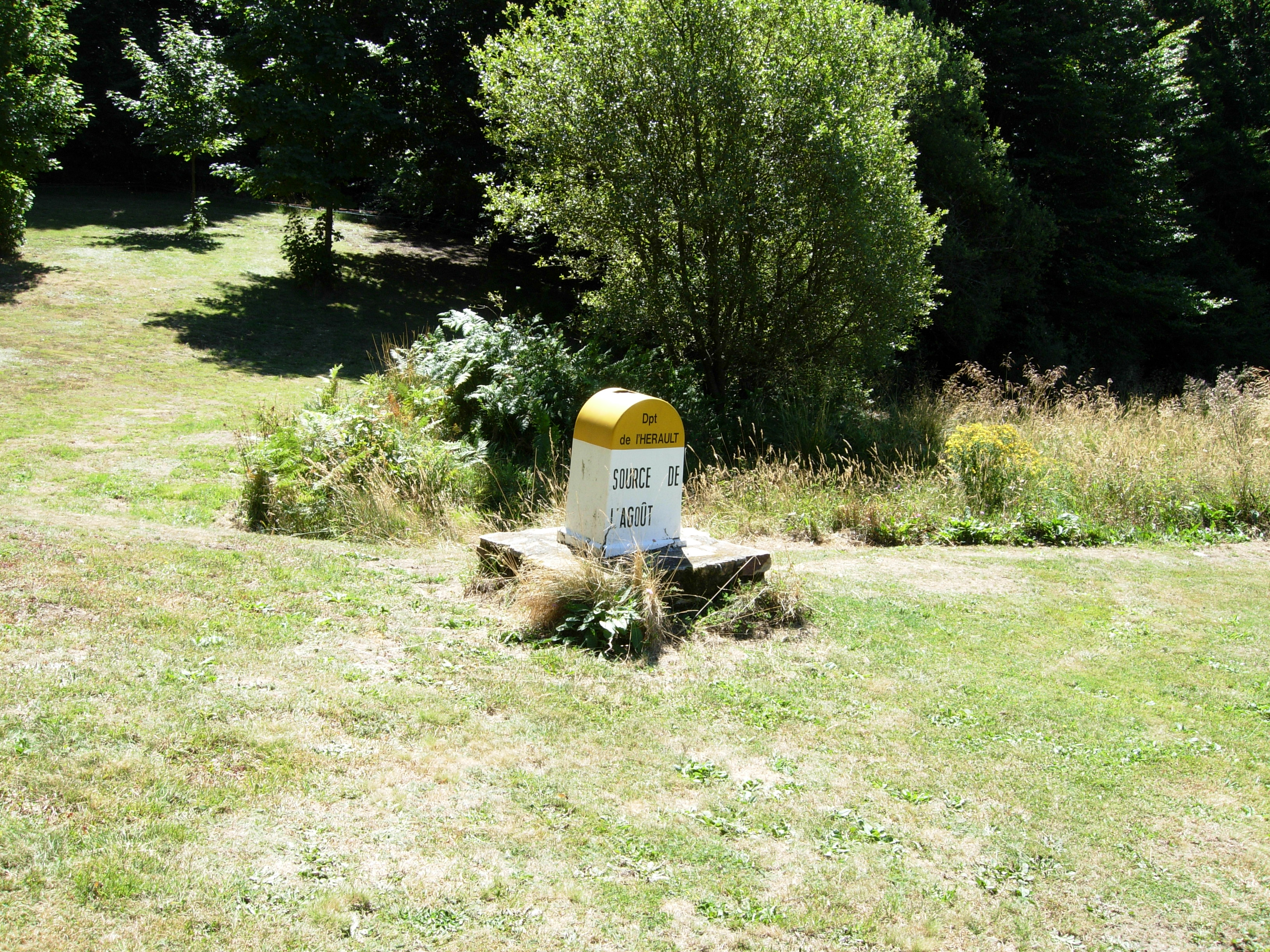
Cambon-et-Salvergues

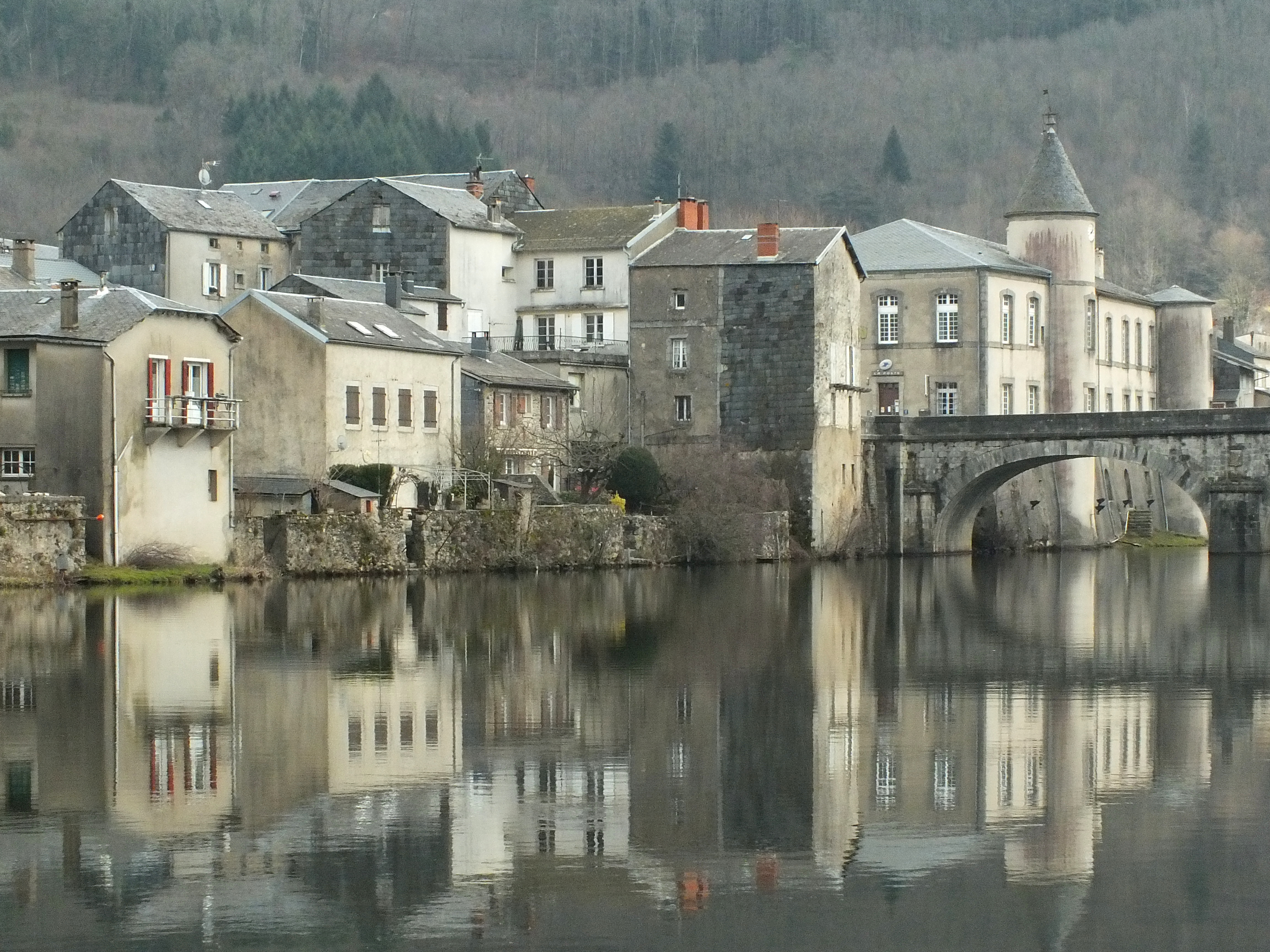
Brassac

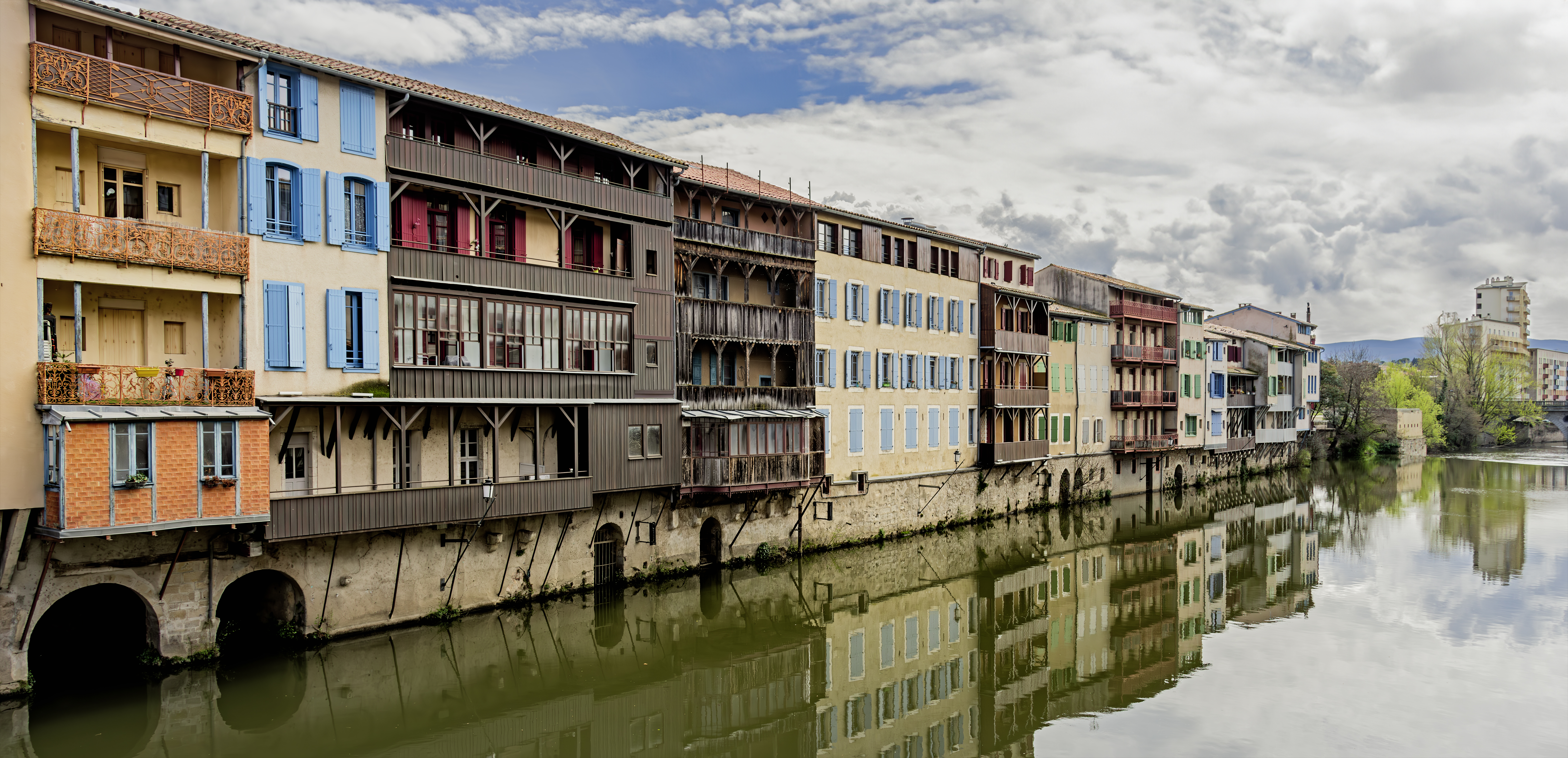
Castres

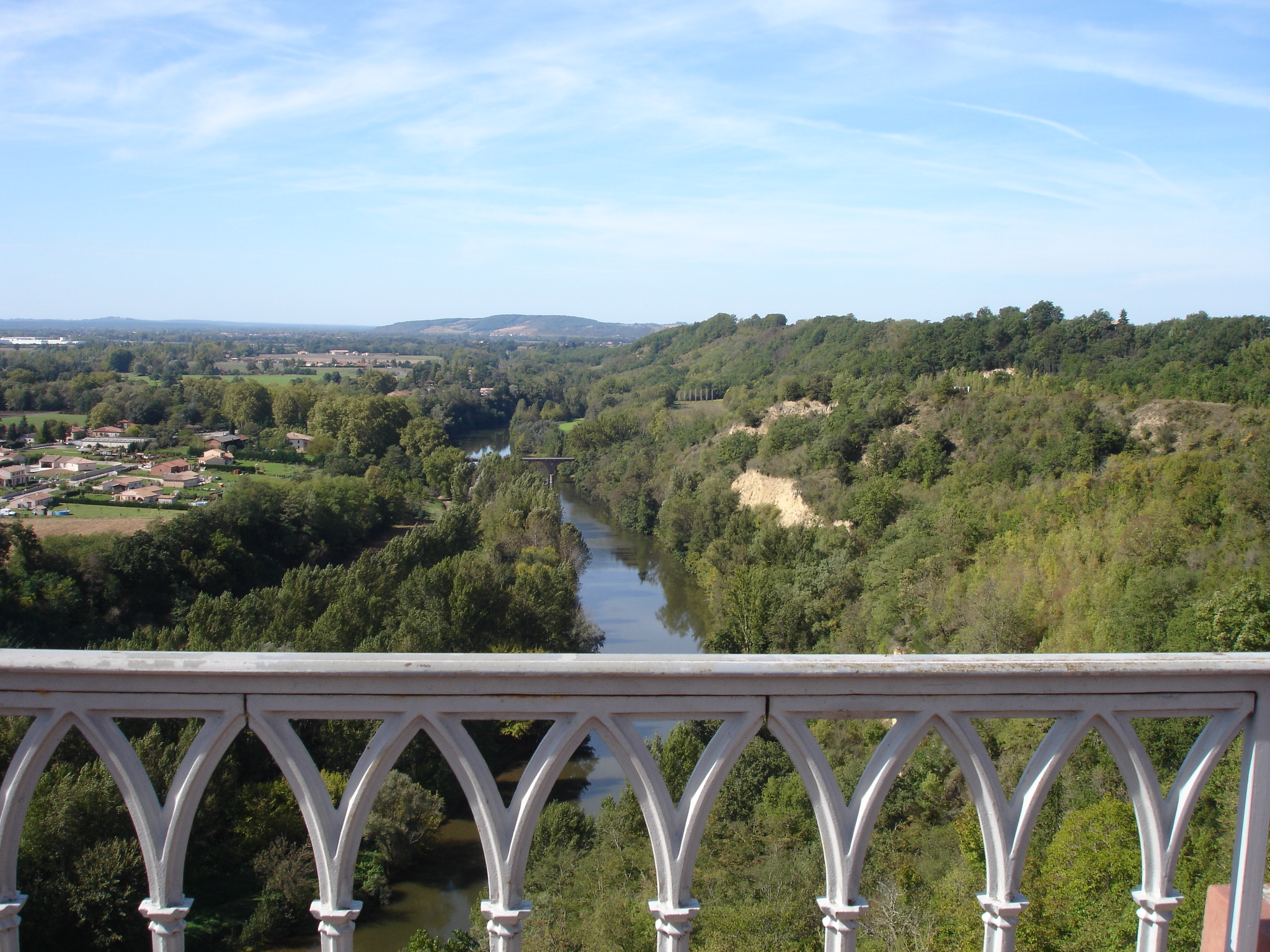
Giroussens

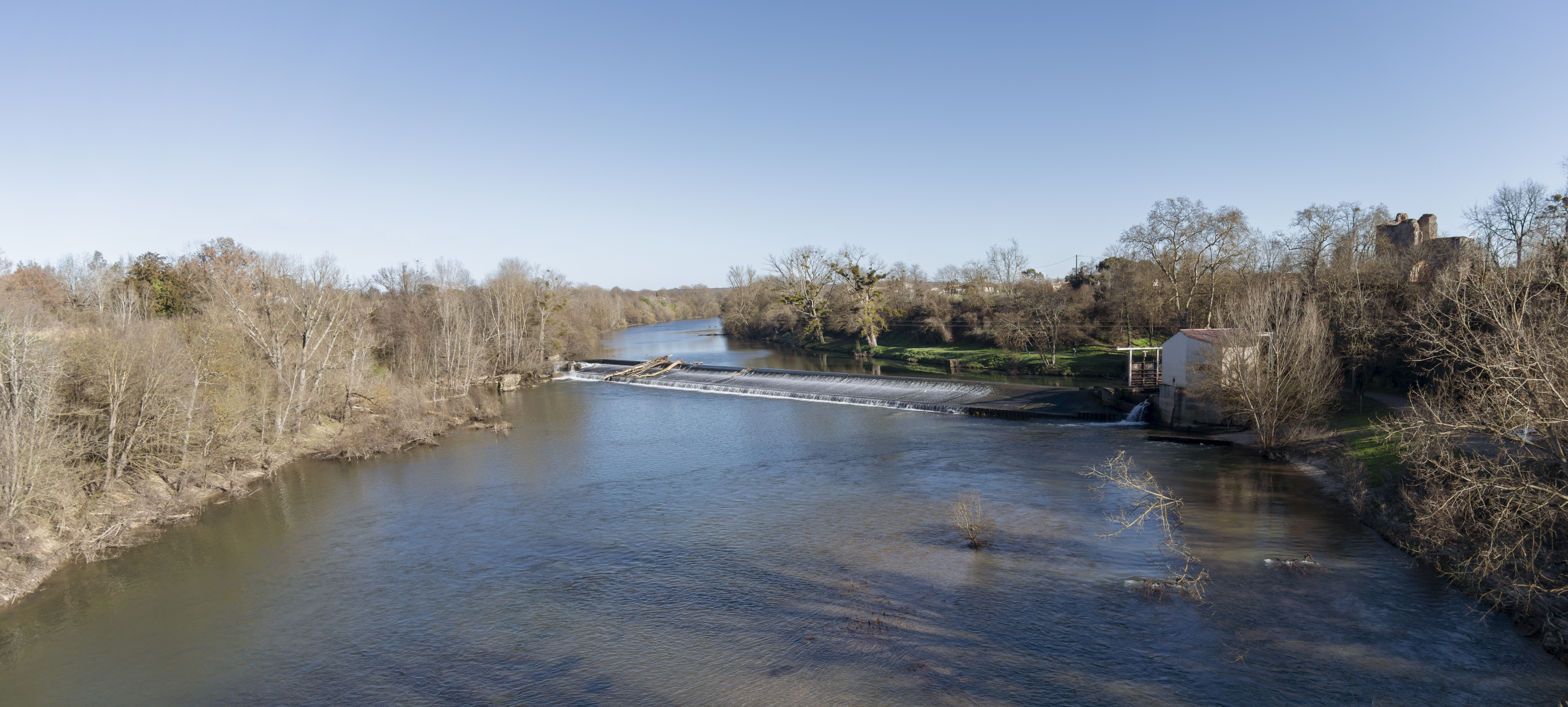
Saint-Sulpice-la-Pointe
