= Barre, Tarn =

Barre
- Commune
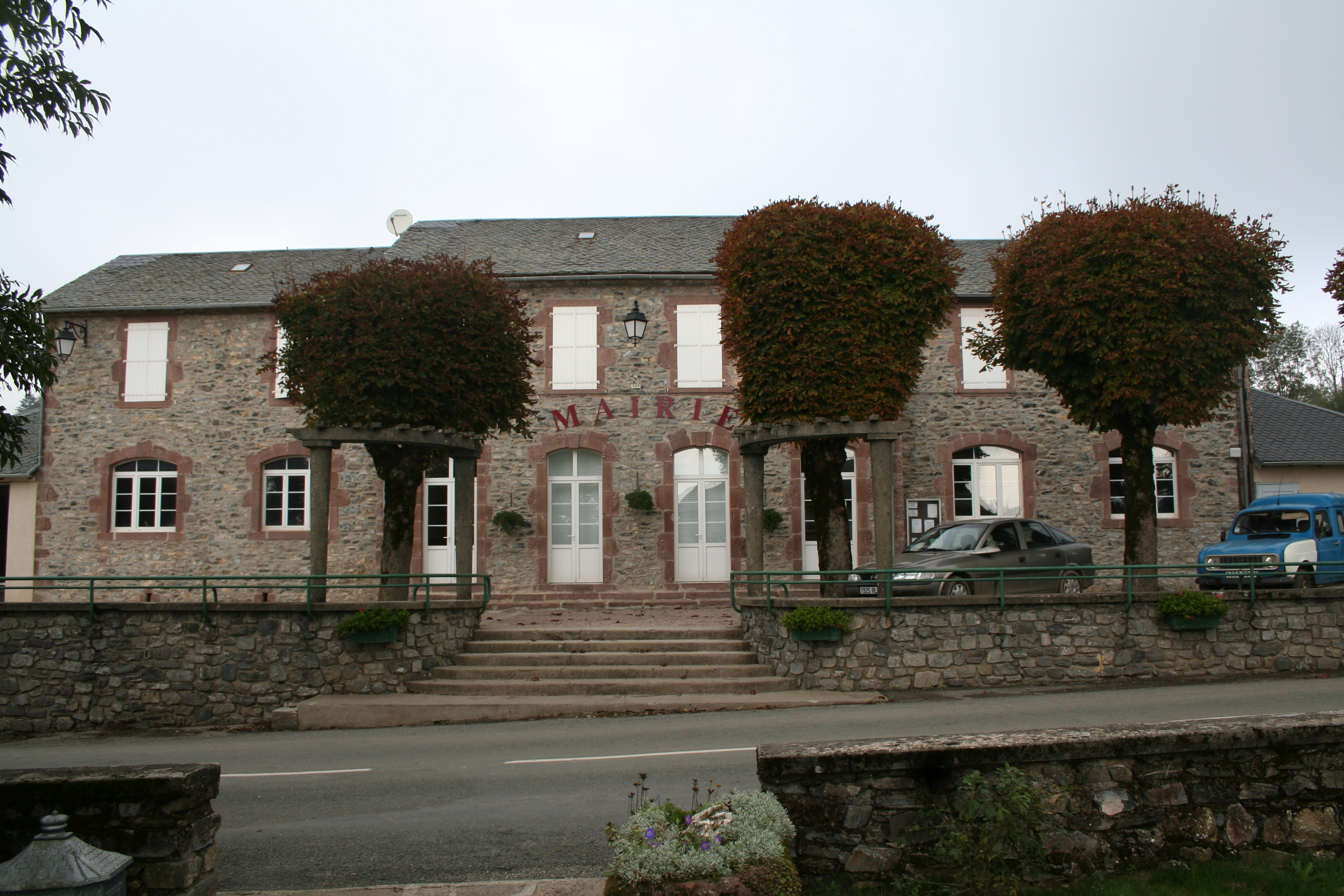
- The town hall and school in Barre
- Location of Barre
- Location within France Location within Occitanie
- Coordinates: 43°45′10″N 2°49′37″E
- Country: France
- Region: Occitania
- Department: Tarn
- Arrondissement: Castres
- Canton: Les Hautes Terres d'Oc
- Intercommunality: CC du Haut-Languedoc

Government
  - Mayor (2022–2026): Vincent Vidal
- Area^{1}: 15.07 km^{2} (5.82 sq mi)
- Elevation: 930 m (3,050 ft)
- Highest elevation: 1,065 m (3,494 ft)
- Lowest elevation: 857 m (2,812 ft)
- Population (2023): 203
  - Density: 13.5/km^{2} (34.9/sq mi)
- Time zone: UTC+01:00 (CET)
  - Summer (DST): UTC+02:00 (CEST)
- INSEE/Postal code: 81023 /81320
- ^{1} French Land Register data, which excludes lakes, ponds, glaciers > 1 km^{2} (0.386 sq mi or 247 acres) and river estuaries.

Barre (French pronunciation: [baʁ(ə)]) is a commune of the Tarn department of southern France.

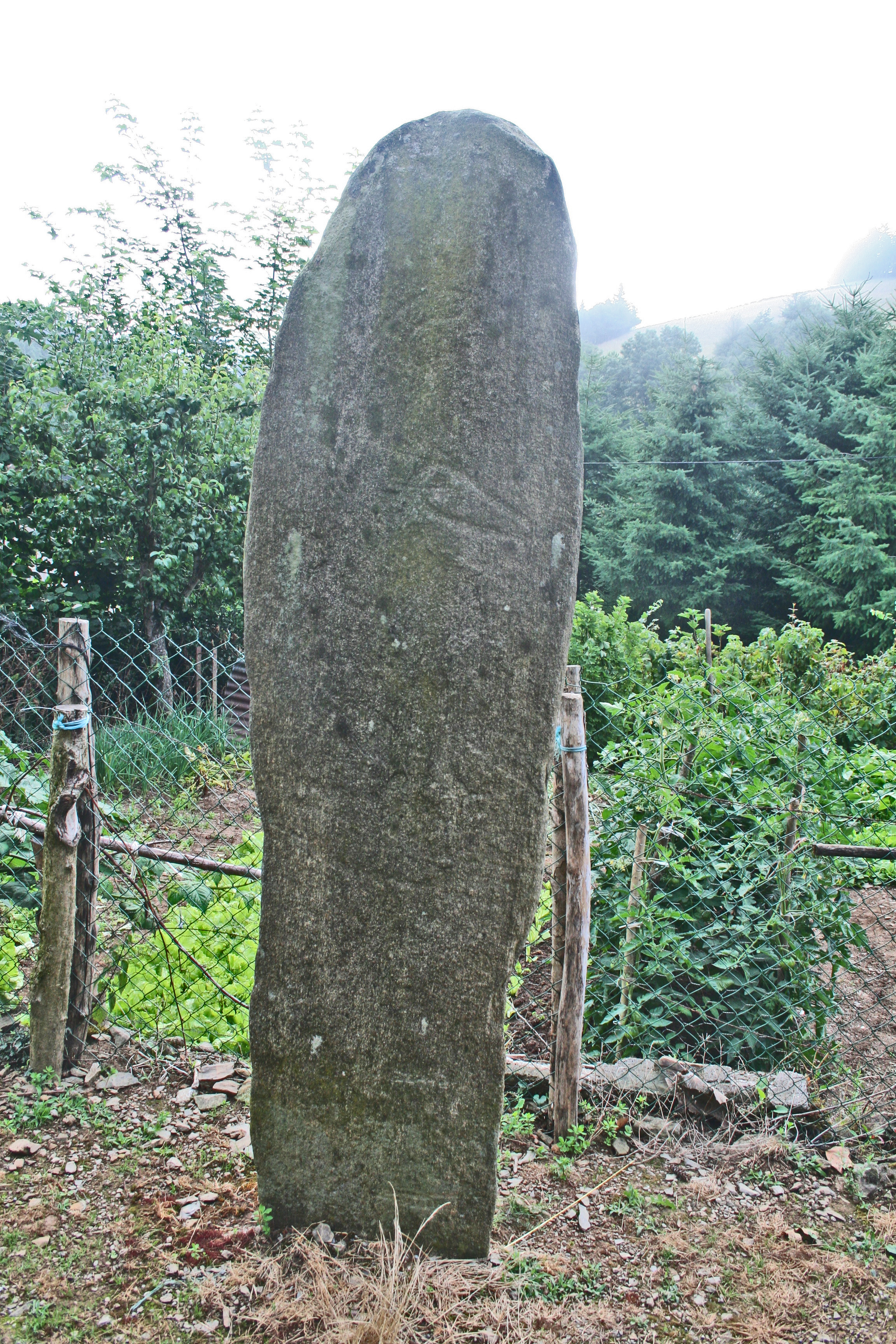
Statue menhir of Cantoul

== See also ==
- Communes of the Tarn department
