= Nages =

- Commune
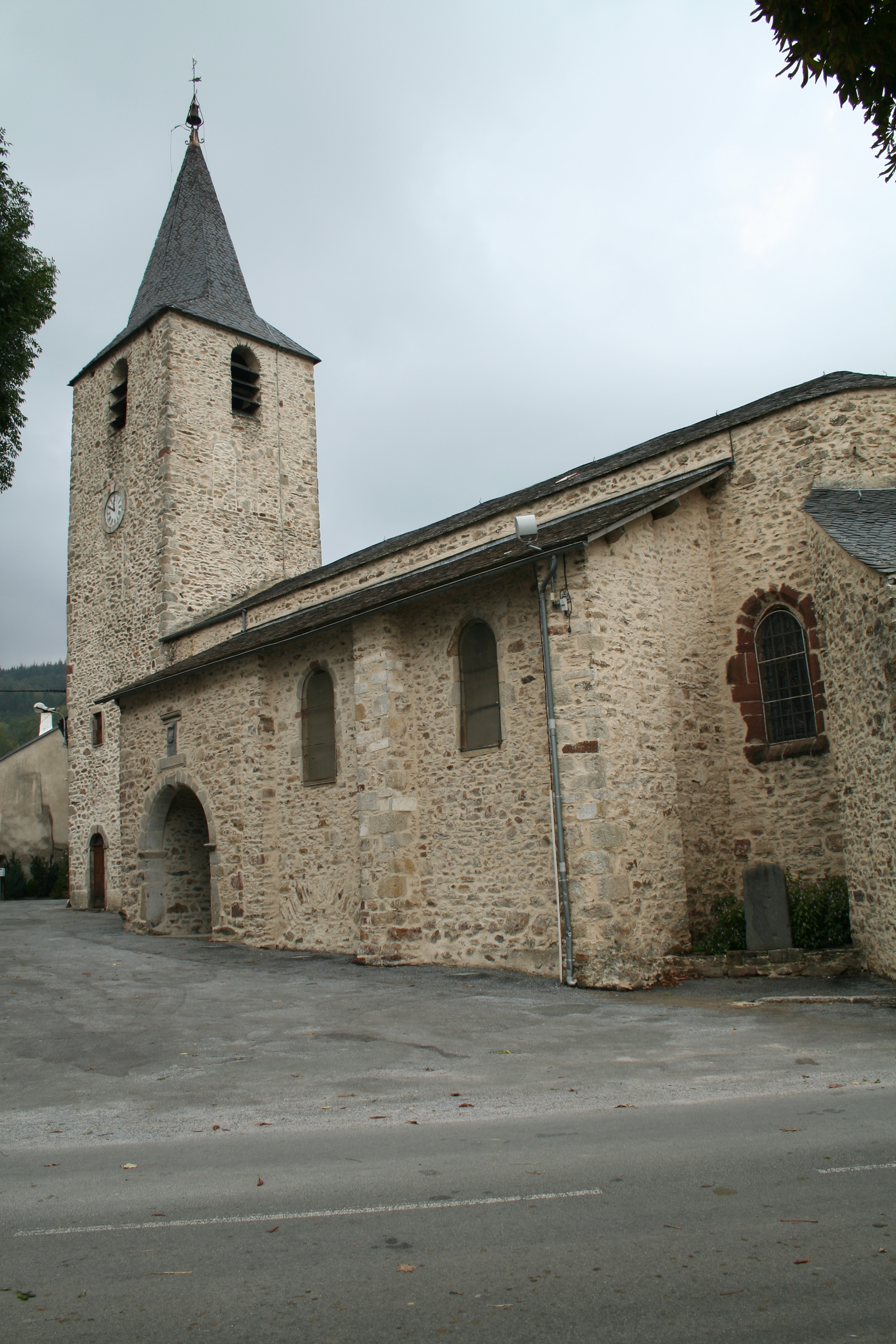
- The church in Nages

- Coat of arms
- Location of Nages
- Location within France Location within Occitanie
- Coordinates: 43°40′37″N 2°46′49″E
- Country: France
- Region: Occitania
- Department: Tarn
- Arrondissement: Castres
- Canton: Les Hautes Terres d'Oc
- Intercommunality: CC du Haut-Languedoc

Government
  - Mayor (2020–2026): Alain Cabrol
- Area^{1}: 47.11 km^{2} (18.19 sq mi)
- Elevation: 800 m (2,600 ft)
- Highest elevation: 1,181 m (3,875 ft)
- Lowest elevation: 700 m (2,300 ft)
- Population (2023): 352
  - Density: 7.47/km^{2} (19.4/sq mi)
- Time zone: UTC+01:00 (CET)
  - Summer (DST): UTC+02:00 (CEST)
- INSEE/Postal code: 81193 /81320
- ^{1} French Land Register data, which excludes lakes, ponds, glaciers > 1 km^{2} (0.386 sq mi or 247 acres) and river estuaries.

Nages (French pronunciation: [naʒ]; Occitan: Najas) is a commune in the Tarn department in southern France.

== Population ==
Historical population
Year	Pop.	±% p.a.
1968	494	—
1975	387	−3.43%
1982	330	−2.25%
1990	321	−0.35%
1999	330	+0.31%
2007	340	+0.37%
2012	330	−0.60%
2017	333	+0.18%
2023	352	+0.93%
Source: INSEE

== See also ==
- Communes of the Tarn department
