= Lacrouzette =

- Commune
- Coat of arms
- Location of Lacrouzette
- Location within France Location within Occitanie
- Coordinates: 43°39′54″N 2°20′56″E
- Country: France
- Region: Occitania
- Department: Tarn
- Arrondissement: Castres
- Canton: Les Hautes Terres d'Oc

Government
  - Mayor (2020–2026): François Bono
- Area^{1}: 28.77 km^{2} (11.11 sq mi)
- Elevation: 550 m (1,800 ft)
- Highest elevation: 700 m (2,300 ft)
- Lowest elevation: 193 m (633 ft)
- Population (2023): 1,540
  - Density: 53.5/km^{2} (139/sq mi)
- Time zone: UTC+01:00 (CET)
  - Summer (DST): UTC+02:00 (CEST)
- INSEE/Postal code: 81128 /81210
- ^{1} French Land Register data, which excludes lakes, ponds, glaciers > 1 km^{2} (0.386 sq mi or 247 acres) and river estuaries.

Lacrouzette (French pronunciation: [lakʁuzɛt]; Occitan: La Croseta) is a commune in the Tarn department in southern France.

== See also ==
- Communes of the Tarn department
