= Moulin-Mage =

- Commune
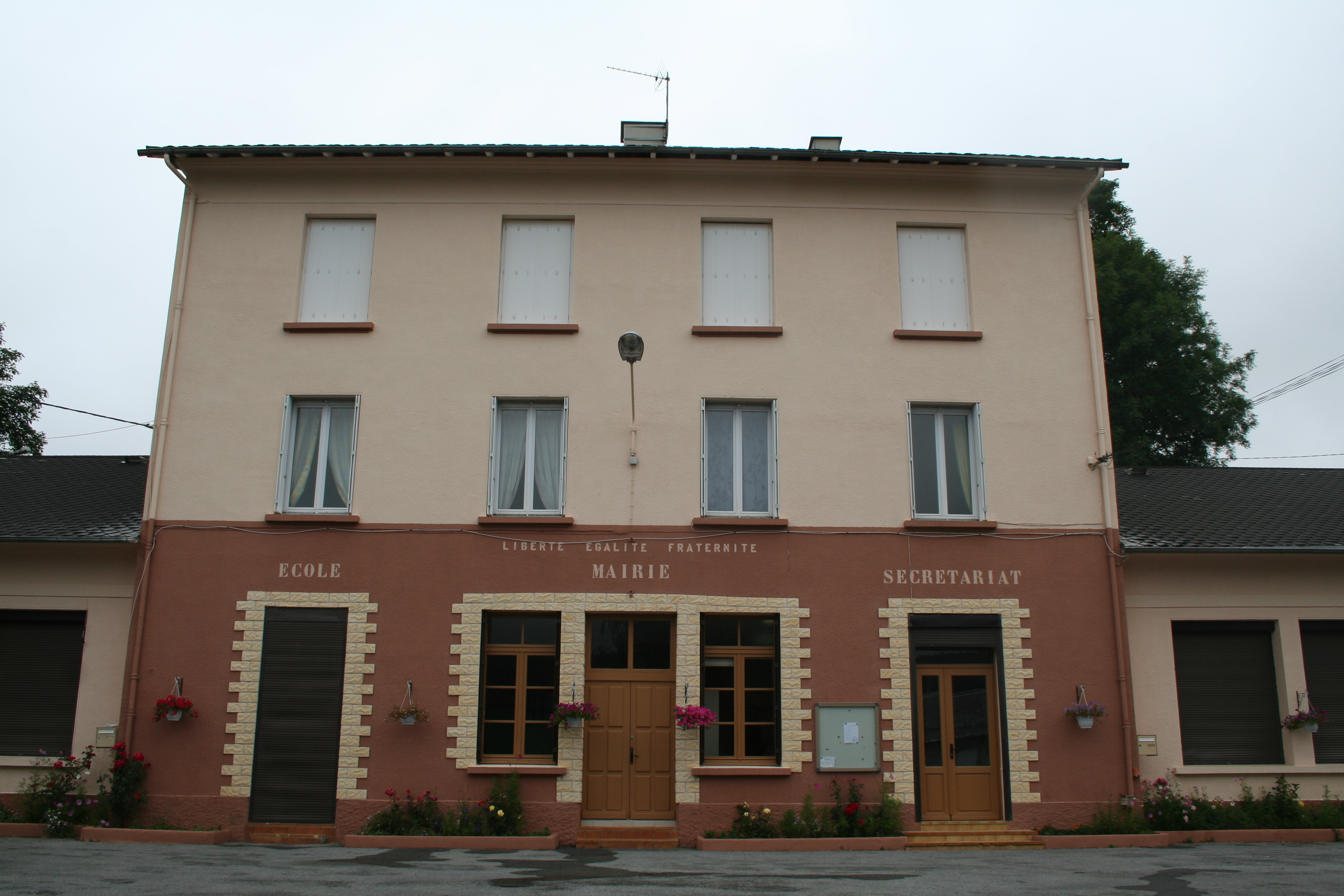
- The mairie in Moulin-Mage

- Coat of arms
- Location of Moulin-Mage
- Location within France Location within Occitanie
- Coordinates: 43°42′46″N 2°48′21″E
- Country: France
- Region: Occitania
- Department: Tarn
- Arrondissement: Castres
- Canton: Les Hautes Terres d'Oc
- Intercommunality: CC du Haut-Languedoc

Government
  - Mayor (2020–2026): Isabelle Calvet
- Area^{1}: 15.06 km^{2} (5.81 sq mi)
- Elevation: 880 m (2,890 ft)
- Highest elevation: 1,022 m (3,353 ft)
- Lowest elevation: 834 m (2,736 ft)
- Population (2023): 295
  - Density: 19.6/km^{2} (50.7/sq mi)
- Time zone: UTC+01:00 (CET)
  - Summer (DST): UTC+02:00 (CEST)
- INSEE/Postal code: 81188 /81320
- ^{1} French Land Register data, which excludes lakes, ponds, glaciers > 1 km^{2} (0.386 sq mi or 247 acres) and river estuaries.

Moulin-Mage (French pronunciation: [mulɛ̃ maʒ]; Occitan: Lo Molin Màger) is a commune in the Tarn department and Occitanie region of southern France.

The name of the settlement – Molin Màger in Occitan – means "main mill".

The population of the commune was 316 at the 2007 census, with a density of 21 people per km^{2}. The city hall is situated at an altitude of 852 meters above sea level. The current elected mayor is Madame Isabelle CALVET, chosen for a 6-year mandate ( 2020-2026 ).

== See also ==
- Communes of the Tarn department
