= Viane, Tarn =

Viane
- Commune
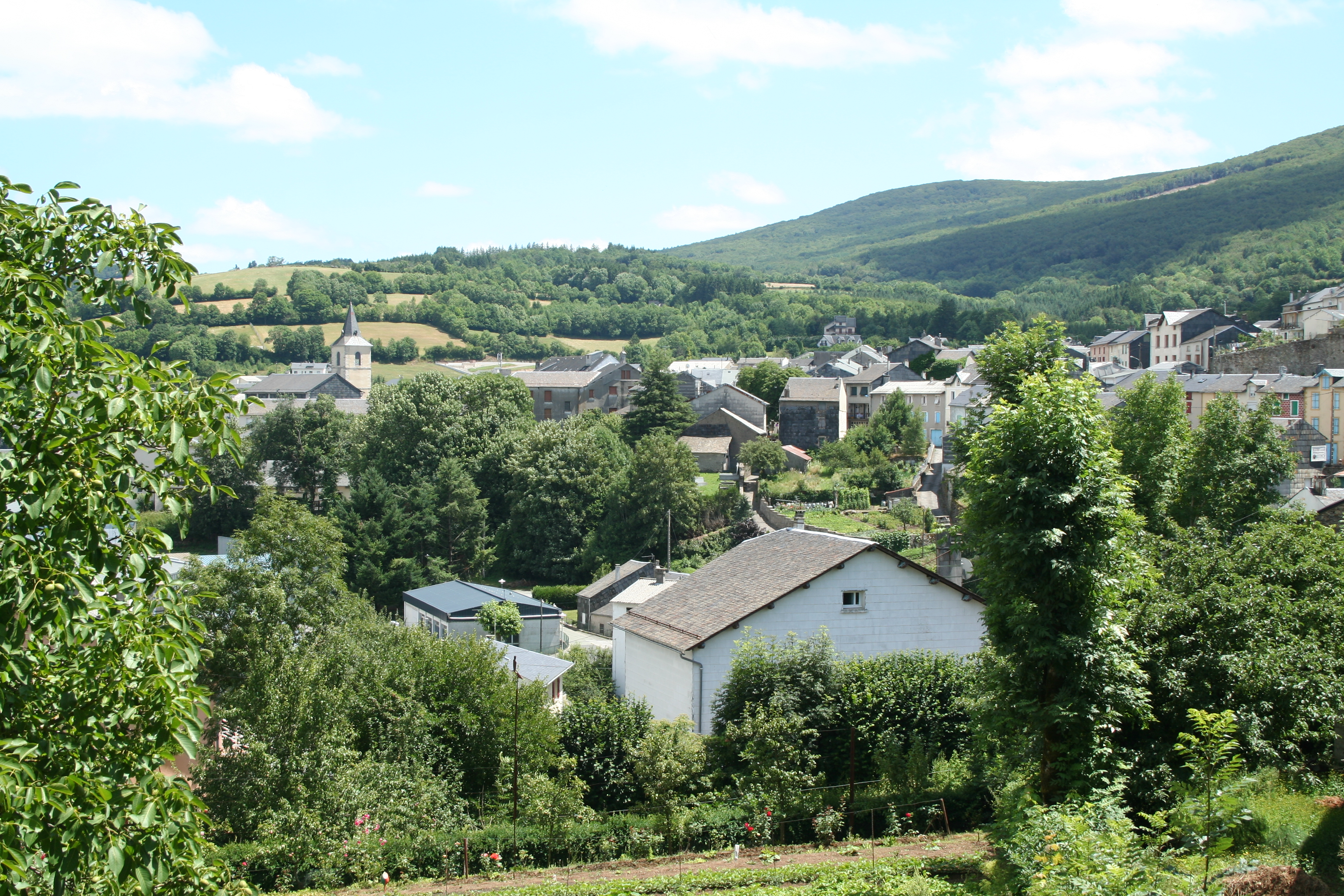
- A general view of Viane

- Coat of arms
- Location of Viane
- Location within France Location within Occitanie
- Coordinates: 43°44′16″N 2°35′02″E
- Country: France
- Region: Occitania
- Department: Tarn
- Arrondissement: Castres
- Canton: Les Hautes Terres d'Oc
- Intercommunality: CC du Haut-Languedoc

Government
  - Mayor (2020–2026): Denis Maffre
- Area^{1}: 38.37 km^{2} (14.81 sq mi)
- Highest elevation: 904 m (2,966 ft)
- Lowest elevation: 475 m (1,558 ft)
- Population (2023): 528
  - Density: 13.8/km^{2} (35.6/sq mi)
- Time zone: UTC+01:00 (CET)
  - Summer (DST): UTC+02:00 (CEST)
- INSEE/Postal code: 81314 /81530
- ^{1} French Land Register data, which excludes lakes, ponds, glaciers > 1 km^{2} (0.386 sq mi or 247 acres) and river estuaries.

Viane (French pronunciation: [vjan]; Occitan: Viana) is a commune in the Tarn department in southern France.

== Geography ==
The river Gijou flows westward through the southern part of the commune and crosses the village.

== See also ==
- Communes of the Tarn department
