= Canton of Les Hautes Terres d'Oc =

Coordinates: 43.71°N 2.69°E

The canton of Les Hautes Terres d'Oc is an administrative division of the Tarn department, southern France. It was created at the French canton reorganisation which came into effect in March 2015. Its seat is in Lacaune.

It consists of the following communes:

1. Anglès
2. Barre
3. Berlats
4. Le Bez
5. Brassac
6. Cambounès
7. Escroux
8. Espérausses
9. Fontrieu
10. Gijounet
11. Lacaune
12. Lacaze
13. Lacrouzette
14. Lamontélarié
15. Lasfaillades
16. Le Masnau-Massuguiès
17. Moulin-Mage
18. Murat-sur-Vèbre
19. Nages
20. Saint-Pierre-de-Trivisy
21. Saint-Salvi-de-Carcavès
22. Senaux
23. Vabre
24. Viane
