= Berlats =

- Commune
- Coat of arms
- Location of Berlats
- Location within France Location within Occitanie
- Coordinates: 43°41′51″N 2°33′56″E
- Country: France
- Region: Occitania
- Department: Tarn
- Arrondissement: Castres
- Canton: Les Hautes Terres d'Oc
- Intercommunality: CC du Haut-Languedoc

Government
  - Mayor (2020–2026): Michel Farenc
- Area^{1}: 10.45 km^{2} (4.03 sq mi)
- Elevation: 570 m (1,870 ft)
- Highest elevation: 896 m (2,940 ft)
- Lowest elevation: 556 m (1,824 ft)
- Population (2023): 119
  - Density: 11.4/km^{2} (29.5/sq mi)
- Time zone: UTC+01:00 (CET)
  - Summer (DST): UTC+02:00 (CEST)
- INSEE/Postal code: 81028 /81260
- ^{1} French Land Register data, which excludes lakes, ponds, glaciers > 1 km^{2} (0.386 sq mi or 247 acres) and river estuaries.

Berlats is a commune of the Tarn department of southern France.

== See also ==
- Communes of the Tarn department
