= Vabre =

- Commune
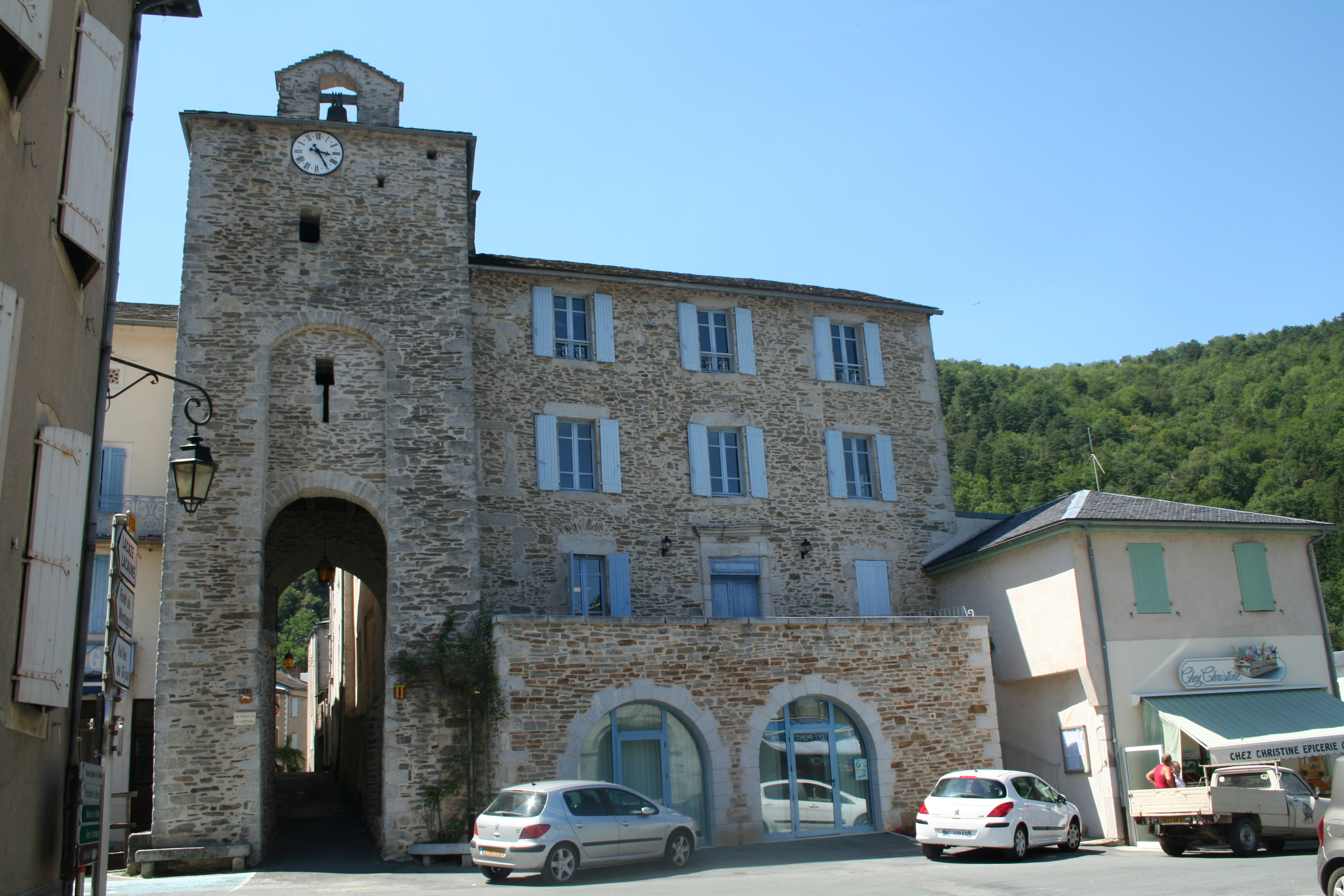
- The fortified gate in Vabre

- Coat of arms
- Location of Vabre
- Location within France Location within Occitanie
- Coordinates: 43°41′38″N 2°25′38″E
- Country: France
- Region: Occitania
- Department: Tarn
- Arrondissement: Castres
- Canton: Les Hautes Terres d'Oc
- Intercommunality: Sidobre Vals et Plateaux

Government
  - Mayor (2020–2026): Françoise Pons
- Area^{1}: 28.43 km^{2} (10.98 sq mi)
- Elevation: 370 m (1,210 ft)
- Highest elevation: 668 m (2,192 ft)
- Lowest elevation: 274 m (899 ft)
- Population (2023): 726
  - Density: 25.5/km^{2} (66.1/sq mi)
- Time zone: UTC+01:00 (CET)
  - Summer (DST): UTC+02:00 (CEST)
- INSEE/Postal code: 81305 /81330
- ^{1} French Land Register data, which excludes lakes, ponds, glaciers > 1 km^{2} (0.386 sq mi or 247 acres) and river estuaries.

Vabre (French pronunciation: [vabʁ]) is a commune in the Tarn department in southern France.

== Geography ==
The village lies on the left bank of the Gijou, which flows southwestward through the southern part of the commune, then flows into the Agout.

== Population ==
Historical population
Year	Pop.	±% p.a.
1968	1,285	—
1975	1,119	−1.96%
1982	1,062	−0.74%
1990	927	−1.69%
1999	810	−1.49%
2007	825	+0.23%
2012	804	−0.51%
2017	774	−0.76%
2023	726	−1.06%
Source: INSEE

== See also ==
- Communes of the Tarn department
