= Saint-Pierre-de-Trivisy =

- Commune
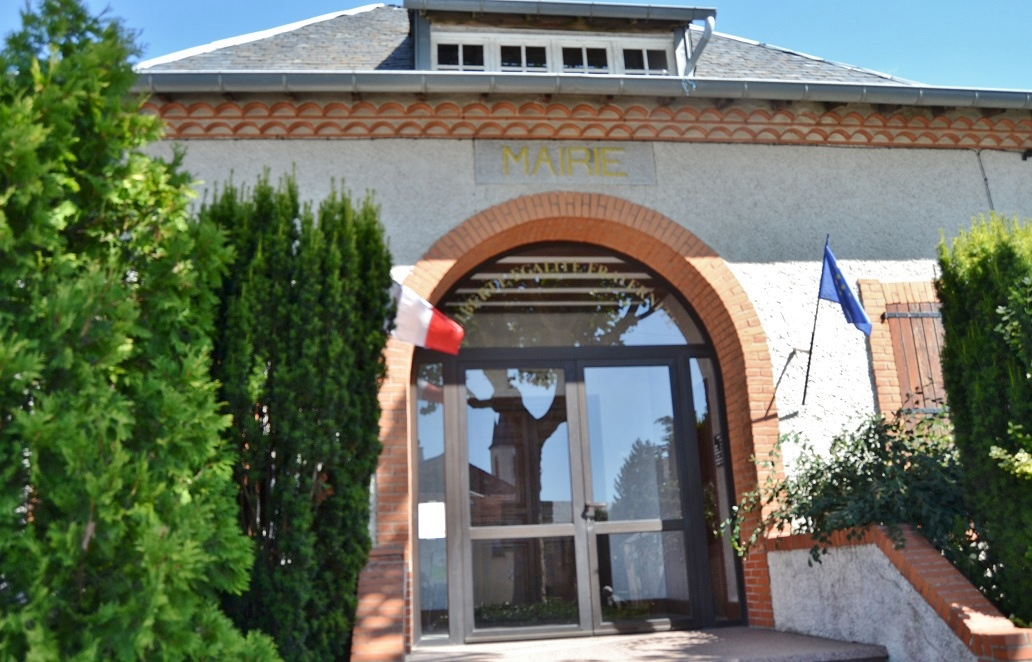
- Town hall

- Coat of arms
- Location of Saint-Pierre-de-Trivisy
- Location within France Location within Occitanie
- Coordinates: 43°45′43″N 2°26′08″E
- Country: France
- Region: Occitania
- Department: Tarn
- Arrondissement: Castres
- Canton: Les Hautes Terres d'Oc
- Intercommunality: Sidobre Vals et Plateaux

Government
  - Mayor (2020–2026): Pascal Cavailles
- Area^{1}: 36.09 km^{2} (13.93 sq mi)
- Elevation: 618 m (2,028 ft)
- Highest elevation: 769 m (2,523 ft)
- Lowest elevation: 373 m (1,224 ft)
- Population (2023): 619
  - Density: 17.2/km^{2} (44.4/sq mi)
- Time zone: UTC+01:00 (CET)
  - Summer (DST): UTC+02:00 (CEST)
- INSEE/Postal code: 81267 /81330
- ^{1} French Land Register data, which excludes lakes, ponds, glaciers > 1 km^{2} (0.386 sq mi or 247 acres) and river estuaries.

Saint-Pierre-de-Trivisy (French pronunciation: [sɛ̃ pjɛʁ də tʁivizi]; Languedocien: Sent Pèire de Trevesi) is a commune in the Tarn department in southern France.

== Geography ==
The commune has an average elevation of 618 metres (2,028 ft) and an area of 36.09 square kilometres (13.93 sq mi). Its population in 2018 was 621.

== See also ==
- Communes of the Tarn department
