= Brassac, Tarn =

Brassac
- Commune
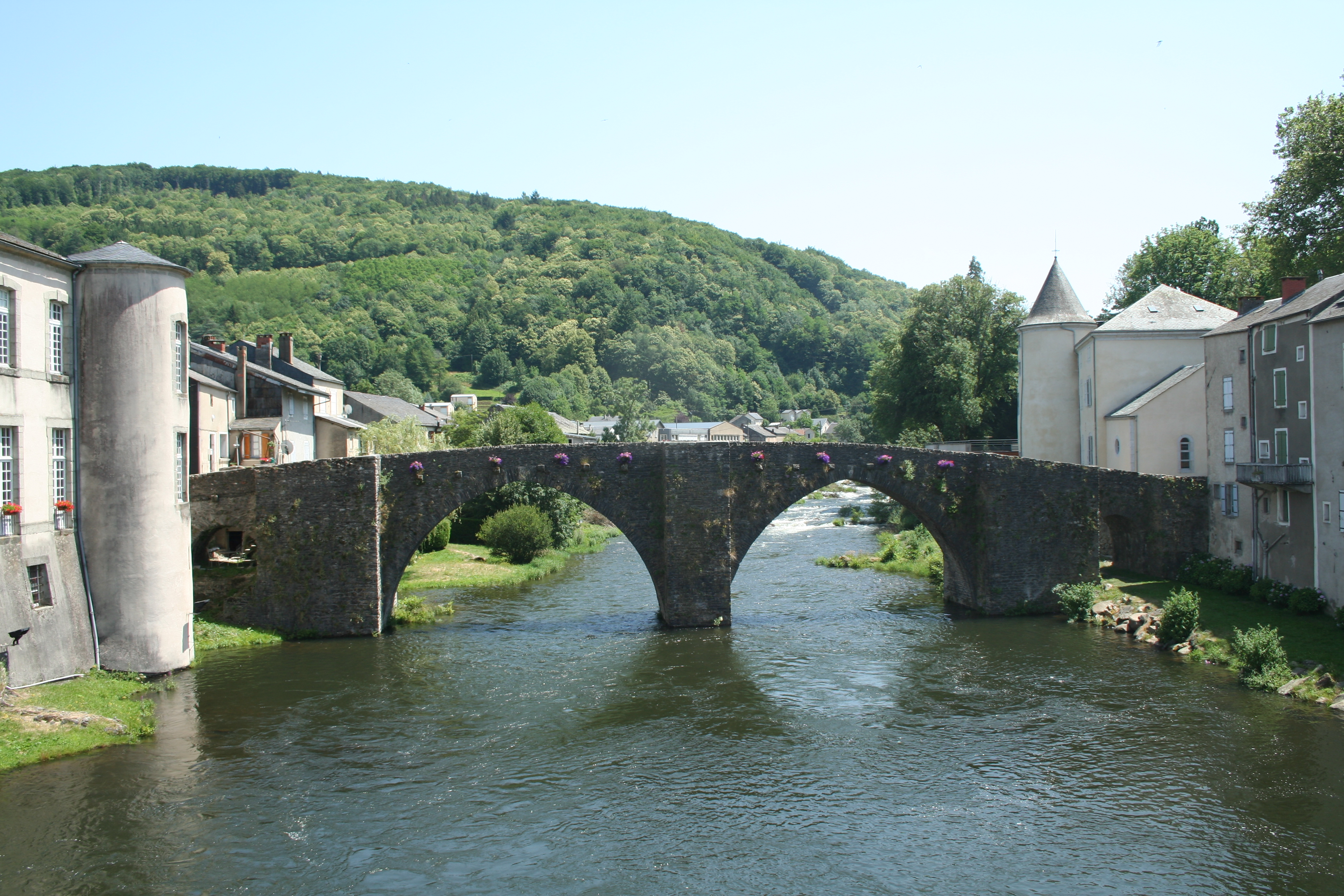
- Bridge

- Coat of arms
- Location of Brassac
- Location within France Location within Occitanie
- Coordinates: 43°37′50″N 2°29′58″E
- Country: France
- Region: Occitania
- Department: Tarn
- Arrondissement: Castres
- Canton: Les Hautes Terres d'Oc
- Intercommunality: Sidobre Vals et Plateaux

Government
  - Mayor (2020–2026): Jean-Claude Guiraud
- Area^{1}: 23.87 km^{2} (9.22 sq mi)
- Highest elevation: 828 m (2,717 ft)
- Lowest elevation: 463 m (1,519 ft)
- Population (2023): 1,289
  - Density: 54.00/km^{2} (139.9/sq mi)
- Time zone: UTC+01:00 (CET)
  - Summer (DST): UTC+02:00 (CEST)
- INSEE/Postal code: 81037 /81260
- ^{1} French Land Register data, which excludes lakes, ponds, glaciers > 1 km^{2} (0.386 sq mi or 247 acres) and river estuaries.

Brassac (French pronunciation: [bʁasak]; Occitan: Braçac) is a commune in the Tarn department in southern France.

== Geography ==
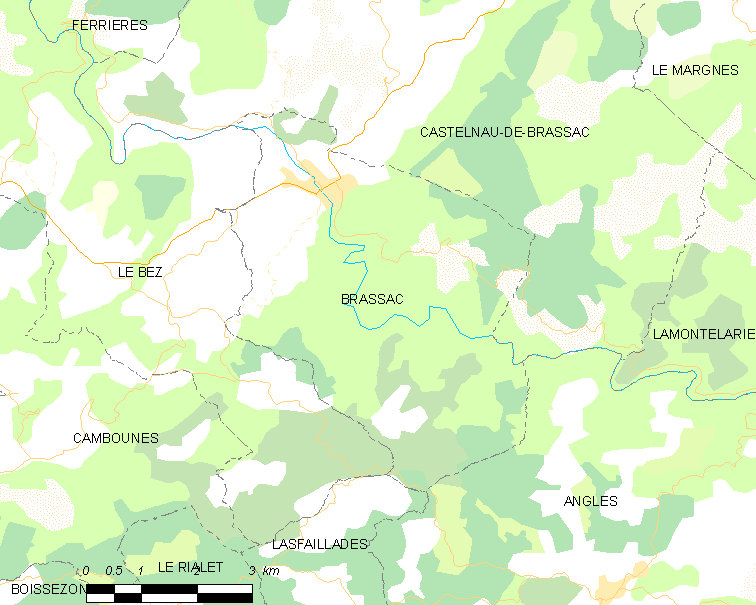
Map

== Gallery ==
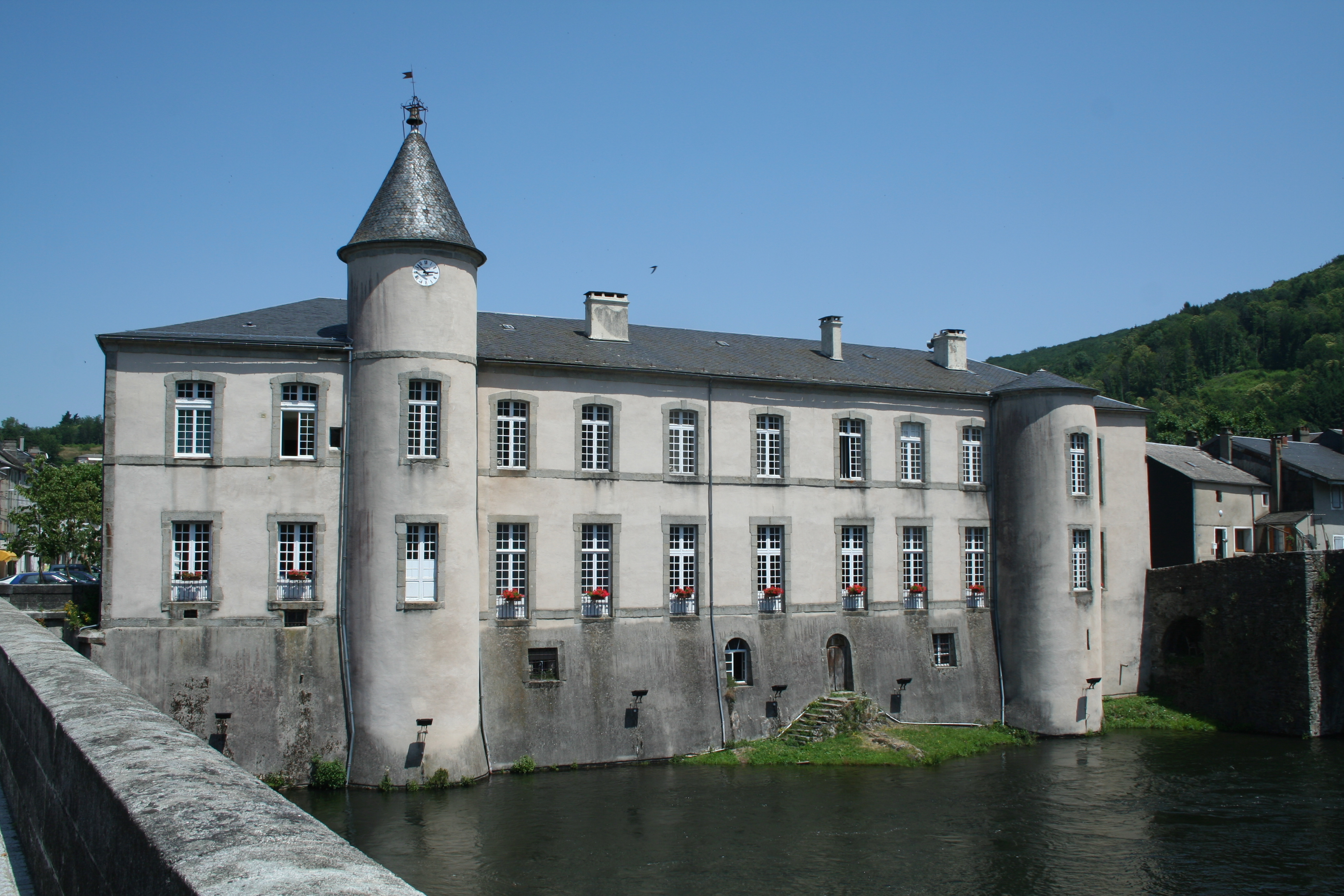
Castle - town hall.

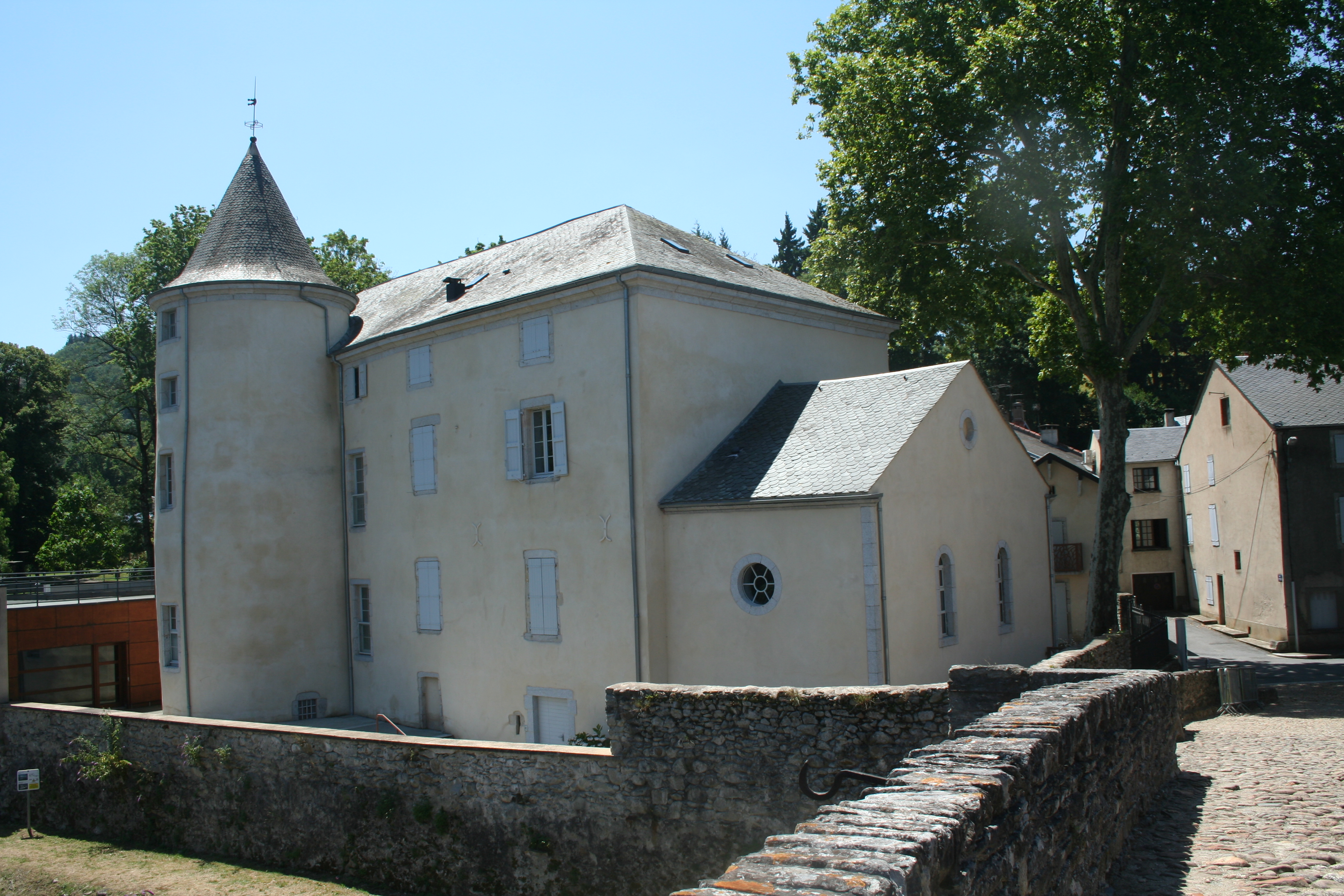
Castle.

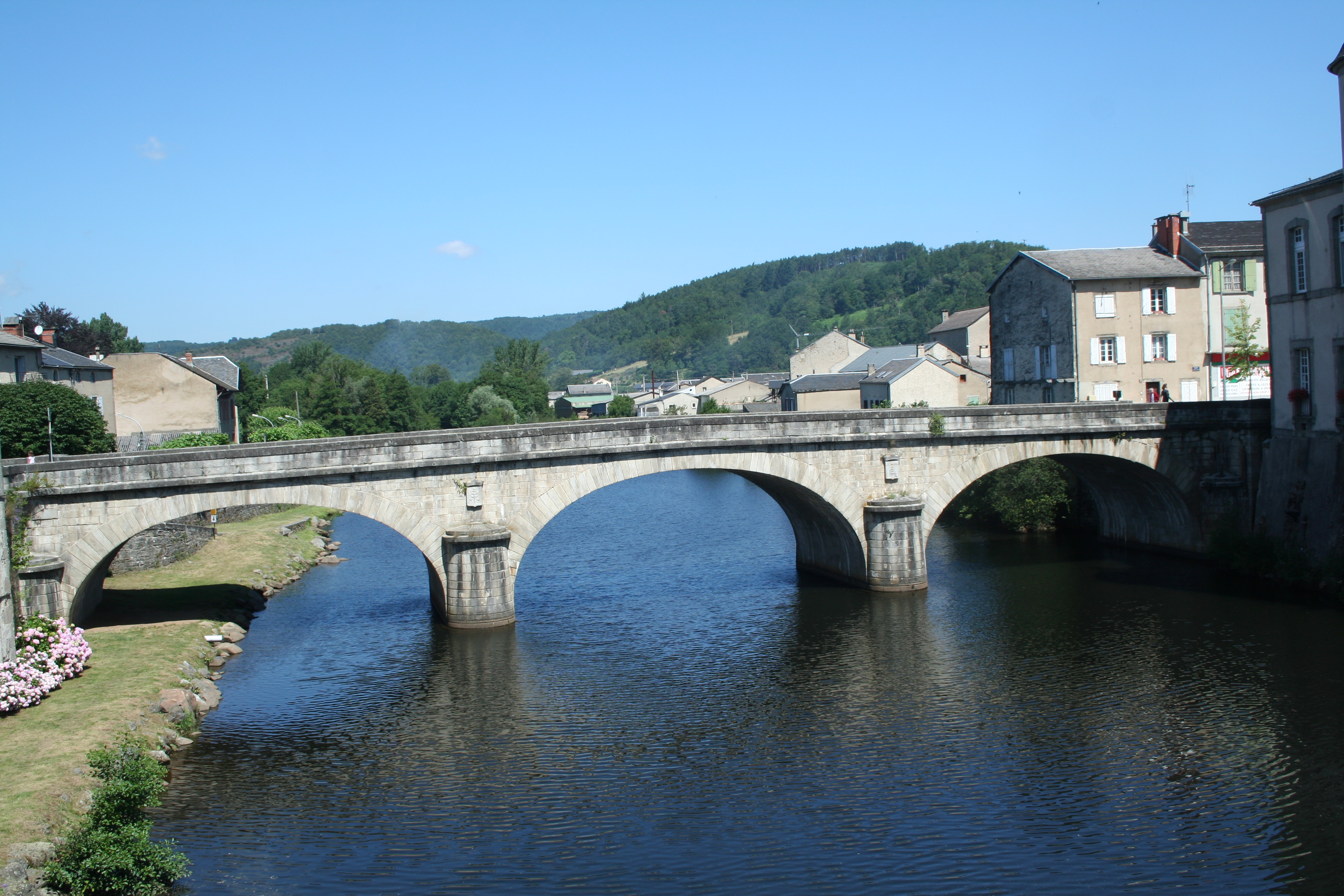
Bridge.

== See also ==
- Communes of the Tarn department
