= Boitard =

Boitard is a surname. Notable people with the surname include:

- François Boitard (1670–c. 1715), French artist
- Louis Peter Boitard, French engraver and designer
- Louise Boitard (1907–2001), French resistance member
- Pierre Boitard (1787–1857), French botanist and geologist
