= Marc Arcis =

French sculptor (1655-1739)

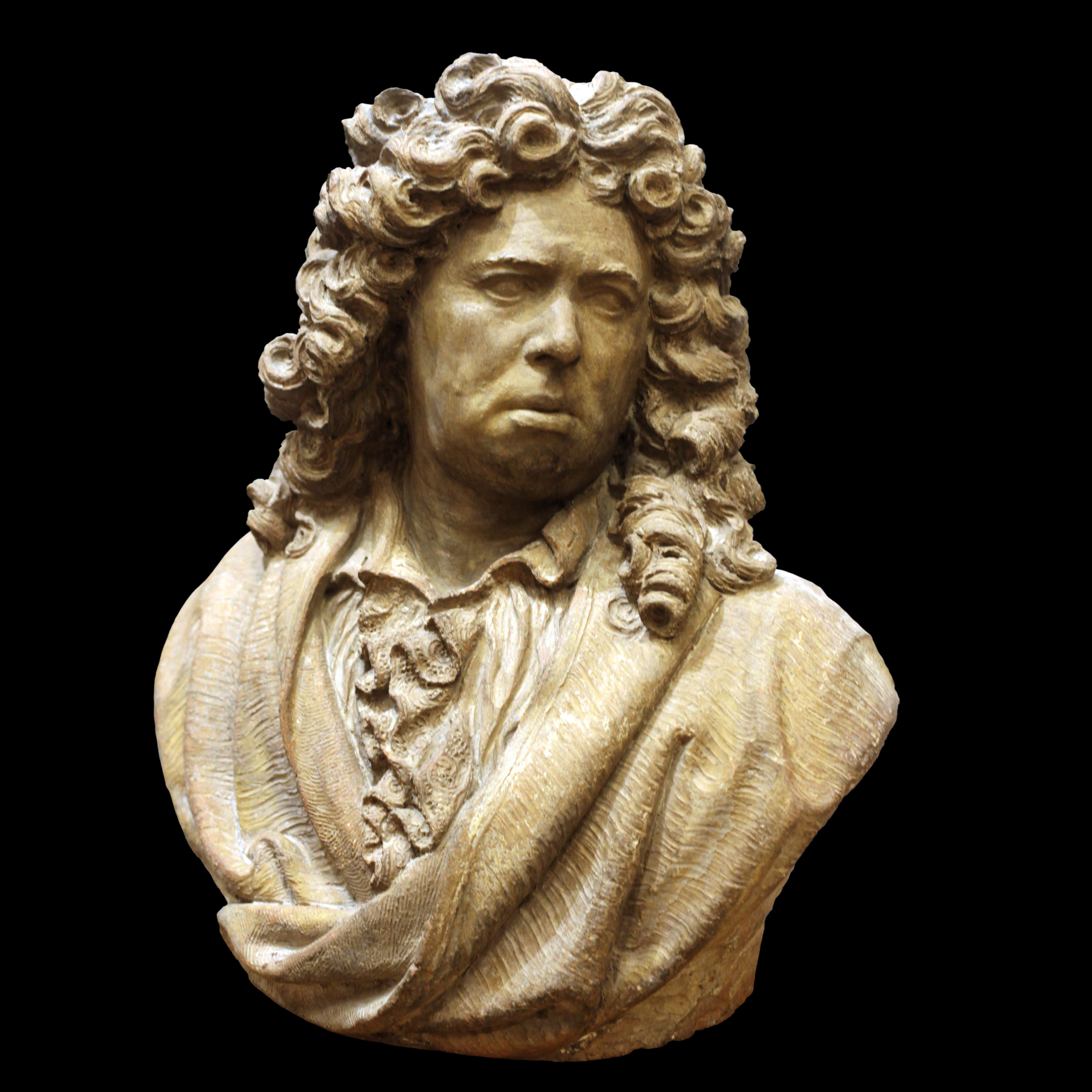
- Self-portrait in the Musée des Augustins
- Born: 1655; Mouzens, Languedoc, France
- Died: October 26, 1739 (aged 83–84); Toulouse
- Spouse: Jeanne Blanc (m. 1691; died 1712)
- Children: 9

Marc Arcis (1655 – 26 October 1739) was a French sculptor. Born in the countryside around Toulouse, Arcis was trained in the city and very early on produced busts for the Hall of the Illustrious between 1674 and 1677. In Paris, he took part in the interior decoration of the église de la Sorbonne and produced works for Versailles. After 1690, he based himself in Toulouse, decorating several chapels and the churches of Saint-Sernin and Saint-Étienne there.

Arcis was particularly skilled in clay and stucco. This made his works much cheaper as stucco, when varnished in a certain way, looked similar to marble but at a fraction of the cost. This allowed him to attain many contacts, particularly with churches. Arcis also had a talent for drawing that allowed him to excel in the magnitude of objects, and he went on to produce many alter pieces for high alters.

== Biography ==
=== Early life ===
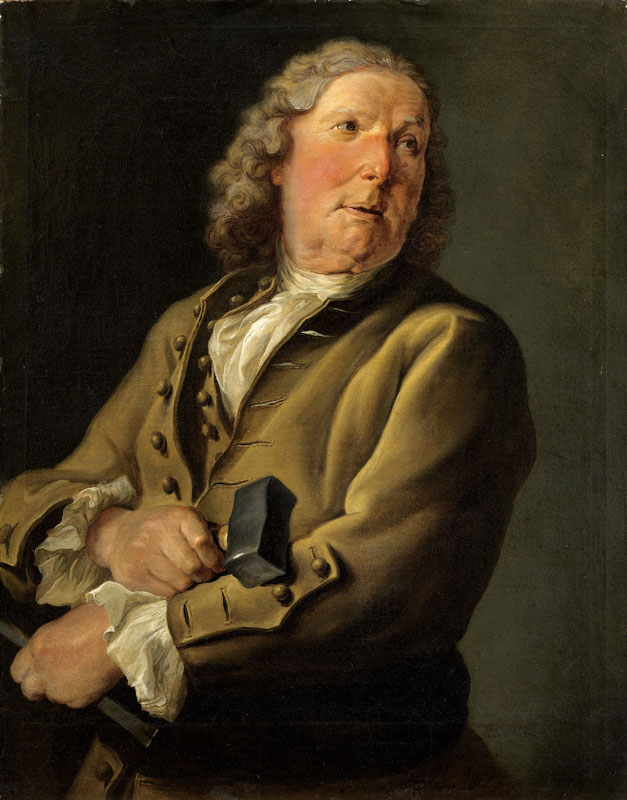
Portrait of Arcis by Antoine Rivalz, who was a student of Arcis and the son of Arcis' teacher Jean-Pierre Rivalz. Made between 1726 and 1735.

Arcis was born in 1655 in Mouzens, located in modern-day Tarn department within the countryside of the Lauragais in the southern French region of Occitania. Since the parish books of Mouzens only begin in 1680, there are no records of the exact date of his baptism or birth. Arcis came from a family of masons. His grandfather Bernard Arcis was a master mason from Labécède-Lauragais in Aude, southeast of Mouzens. He married Jeanne Escoffre and had a son called Jean, born in 1624 in Labécède, who also became a mason. Jean likely moved to Mouzens to work on the reconstruction of the village's church. He married Isabeau Olivier, daughter of a blacksmith, on 1 January 1650 and together they had three children: Marc (the eldest), Suzanne and Jean. Jean became a stonemason and later a sculptor who frequently worked with his older brother on projects, particularly those around Toulouse and Pau. Their father Jean later remarried to Antoinette Bosc and had three more children - Suzanne, Marc Antoine and Jeanne - before dying in 1704.

Little is known of Arcis' childhood or how he managed to study sculpting in Toulouse. However, it seems he processed a precocious sense of talent that was noticed by the Foucaud family who owned a private mansion in the city. They arranged for Arcis to be brought from the countryside and recommended him to local artists they knew. He subsequently became a student of the architect and painter Jean-Pierre Rivalz, and sculptor Gervais Drouet.

When Arcis was 23-years old in 1674, he began his first major project when he was commissioned to create a series of thirty terracotta busts of famous people from Toulouse to decorate the Salle des Illustres (Hall of the Illustrious) when work was being done on the town hall at the Capitole de Toulouse. This included a bust of King Louis XIV. Arcis completed the project in 1677. He earned 20 livres per bust and 60 livres for the king's bust. Louis XIV's bust may have been modelled off a bust created by Gian Lorenzo Bernini as Drouet had worked with Bernini and may have had a replica of Bernini's bust. The king is depicted with a large wig and raised chin. The bust originally had a light bronze colour with a green patina, but in 1677 it was made gilded to pay homage the Louis XIV's title of the "sun king". The busts were arranged on three walls in the room, placed in gilded niches. Arcis also produced other elements of the room, such as a stucco and stone bas-relief to accompany the portrait of Louis XIV.

=== In Paris ===
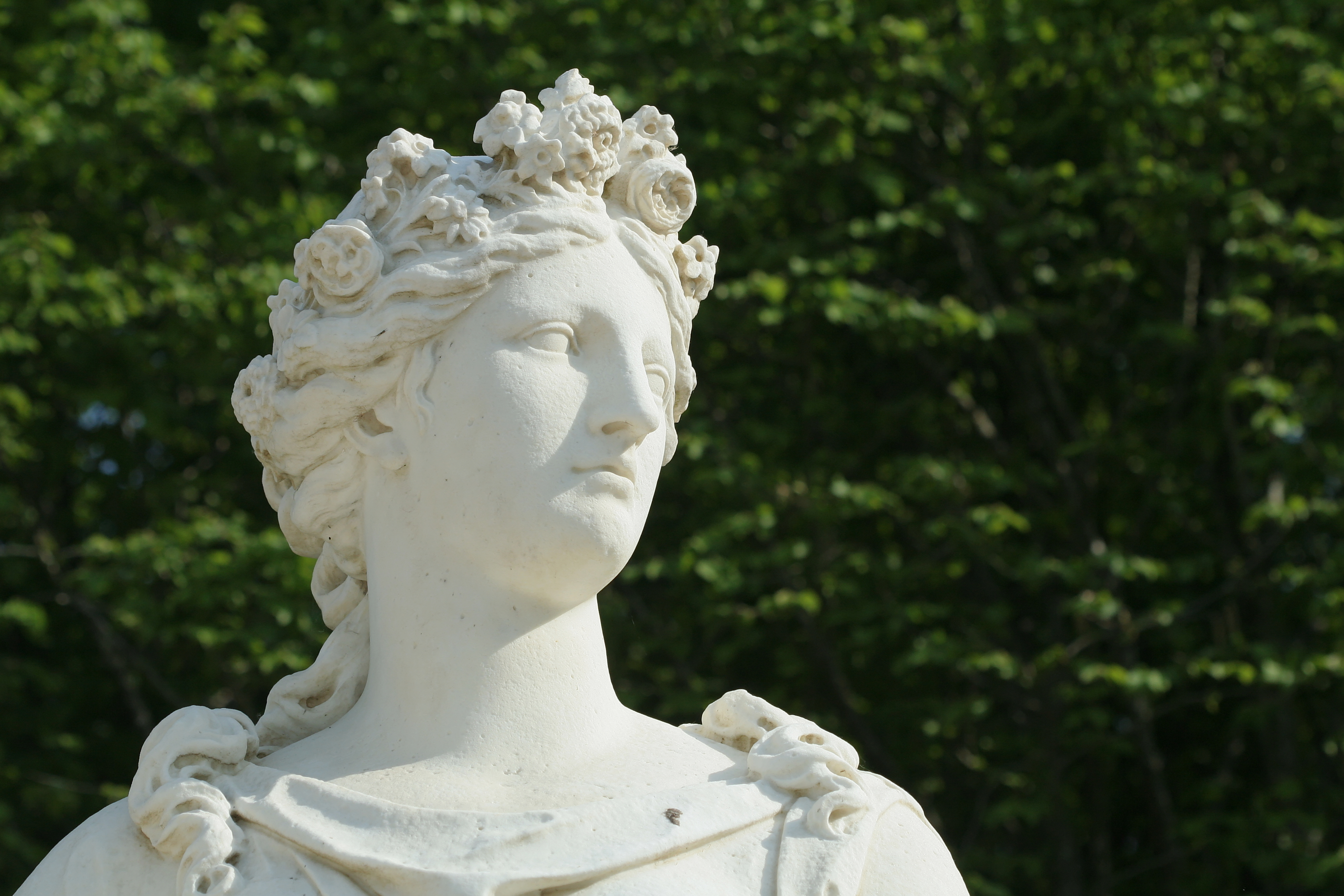
Sculpture of Apollo at the Palace of Versailles, made from marble in 1688 by Arcis and Simon Mazière.

After completing the series of busts, Arcis decided to relocate to Paris in 1677 given the opportunities presented by the construction of the Palace of Versailles. Initially, for several years, he worked for private individuals. This included a cousin of Gaspard de Fieubet, a magistrate who served as president of the Parlement of Toulouse, who spoke positively about Arcis to de Fieubet. After less than two years in Paris, Arcis made a request to the city officials of Toulouse for financial assistance so that he could "improve himself in the art of sculpture" and " put himself in a position to repay the city with his services in a few years, with more benefit and advantage". The city agreed and Arics would undertake several tasks in Paris on behalf of Toulouse. In 1684, he helped make contact with Parisian artists, such as Jean Jouvenet and Antoine Coypel, to work on the continued renovations on the Capitole. The following year Arcis was admitted to the Royal Academy of Painting and Sculpture. This opened Arcis to working at the Palace of Versailles, he helped decorate the gardens by sculpting vases. He also decorated the trumeau of the overdoors of the royal apartments. Additionally, he made ornaments for high-ranking members of the royal Court. His role at Versailles ended in 1687 and shortly thereafter he returned to southern France. At Versailles, Arcis occupied mainly a secondary position and there were less opportunities for him there then in the provinces. Also, the financial difficulties of France at the time meant artist were sometimes paid late. In 1717, Arcis received 1,800 livres for the Vase of Sunflowers on the Royal Alley, 30-years after it had been commissioned.

=== Return to Southern France ===
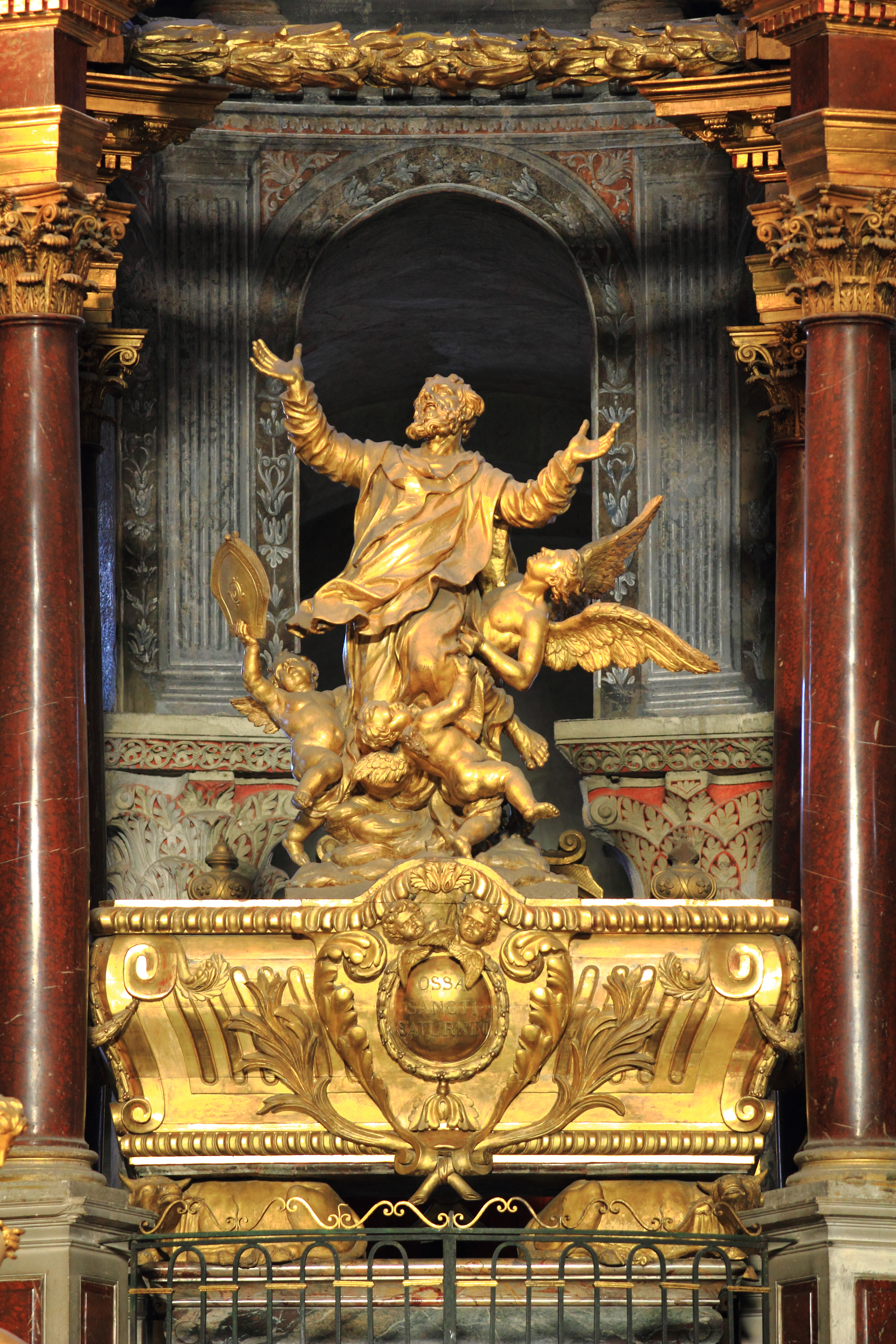
The altar piece at the Basilica of Saint-Sernin. Arcis' work on Saint-Sernin was his last major project before his death in 1739.

After Paris, Arcis arrived in Pau in October 1688 to create a full statue of Louis XIV out of marble after Françoise Girardon had made a design. The difficulties brought on trying to supply marble to Pau caused much disappointment for Arics. France had been trying to locally produce marble to reduce its reliance on marble imported from Italy and marble had been discovered in the Pyrenees around 1676. Marble for the statue was meant to come from the Ossau Valley. When Arcis arrived in Saint-Béat, he found that the marble were in the upper parts of the quarry and had to be thrown from the top, where upon they broke once they struck the ground. Pau officials were forced in June 1690 to change the statue's material to bronze. Arics used the marble from Saint-Béat again when he made a bust of François de Nupces around 1708. There, he admitted the marble had "a fatter grain than that of Genoa" and was of a lower than its Italian counterparts. Although in Arcis' career he mainly sculpted with clay, plaster or stucco, he used marble again in 1712 when he worked on the marble mausoleum of Hector de Gélas de Voisins, Marquis of Ambres, by creating a life-size sculpture of Hector kneeling on a prie-dieu.

Whilst working in Pau, he would receive orders from clients in Toulouse. One such client was Gabriel Vendages de Malepeïre, a member of the Acadèmia dels Jòcs Florals, who commissioned Arcis to finish decorating the chapel of Notre-Dame du Mont-Carmel for the Grands Carmes (Carmelites) in Toulouse. In 1701, Arcis returned to working on the town hall of Toulouse after work on the third gallery had been abandoned for several years. He decorated the trumeau located above where the large paintings would be hang and he finished his work by 1706. In parallel to his work on the Capitole, Arcis worked for the Church of Our Lady of the Assumption in Grenada-sur-Garonne where he designed the figures of Saint Sebastian and Saint Roch as side niches for the alter. In 1705, White Penitents in Toulouse commissioned Arcis to embellish their chapel with six trumeau with sculpted images of prophets and a half relief of two angels. In 1717, he designed the high alter for the Tarbes Cathedral in Tarbes, southwest of Toulouse. The conventual church of the Grands Augustins signed a contract with Arics in 1722 for him to create a large stucco bas-relief of Saint Augustine in ecstasy as based on a painting by Anthony van Dyck. In 1725, the Pénitents Bleus commissioned him to design ten large stucco bas-reliefs for their chapel to represent the three theological virtues, four cardinal virtues, and three moral virtues of the brotherhood. The Saint-Étienne Cathedral (Toulouse Cathedral) in 1727 had Arcis create statues of Saint Mark and Saint Luke.

Arcis' last major project started in 1718 and continued intermittently to his death in 1738. It concerned the renovation of the choir of the Basilica of Saint-Sernin. He designed a bas-relief made from lead and gilded tin to represent the martyrdom of Saint Saturninus and also an altar with moulded edges made from Caunes-Minervois marble. Work on the church resumed in 1736 when Arcis replaced the Gothic baldachin with a modern version and to redesign the canopy above the reliquary of Saint Sernin. Arcis died on 26 October 1739.

== Personal life ==
Whilst working on a statue of Louis XIV for the city of Pau in 1691, Arcis married Jeanne Blanc and their marriage contact was registered in Toulouse on 7 December. Jeanne was the daughter of Bernard Blanc, a sculptor and architect working in Toulouse, and Marie de Brun. Arcis often went back and forth between Pau and Toulouse until the birth of three of his children - Marie-Anne, Bernard, and Louise - in Pau where he resided for several years. From 1696, he lived in Toulouse as his other six children - Pierre Marc, Jean, Jacques, Antoine, Marc and Marie-Françoise - were born there and baptised at Saint-Étienne Cathedral (Toulouse Cathedral). Arcis outlived Jeanne who died around 14 April 1712. Two of his sons, Antoine and Marc, became sculptors themselves and worked in Toulouse.

After 1703, Arcis bought a home on Rue Peyras in Toulouse. He often mingled with some of his clients, including the poet Jean-Galbert de Campistron who Arics made a bust for in 1723 for the Hall of the Illustrious. He was also friends with fellow sculptor Louis Capela. He helped train Antoine Rivalz, son of Arcis' former teacher Jean-Pierre, along with his Antoine's father and Raymond Lafage.

== Sculptures ==
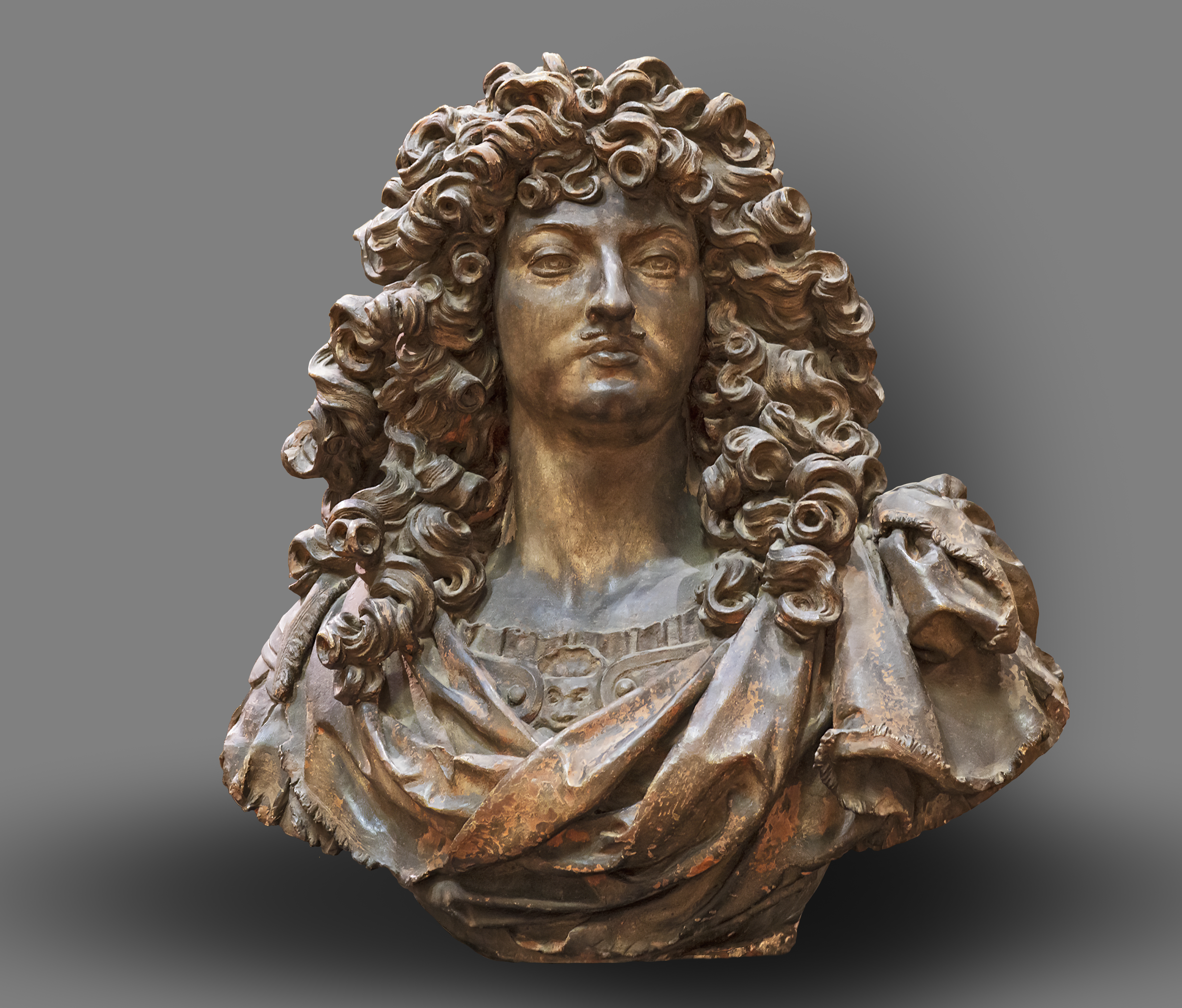
Louis XIV, 1674, for the Hall of Illustrious.

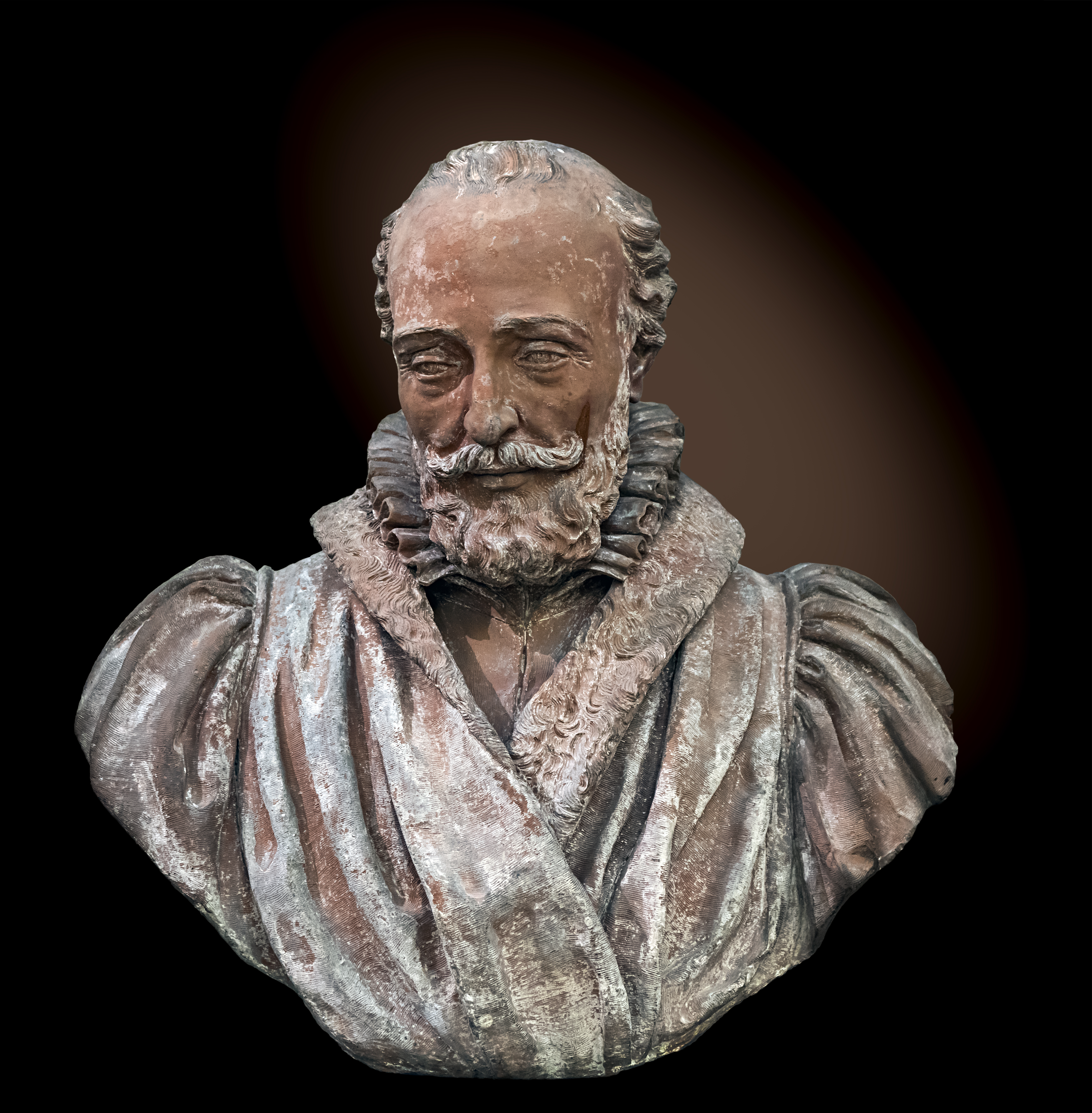
Auger Ferrier, c. 1674, for the Hall of Illustrious.

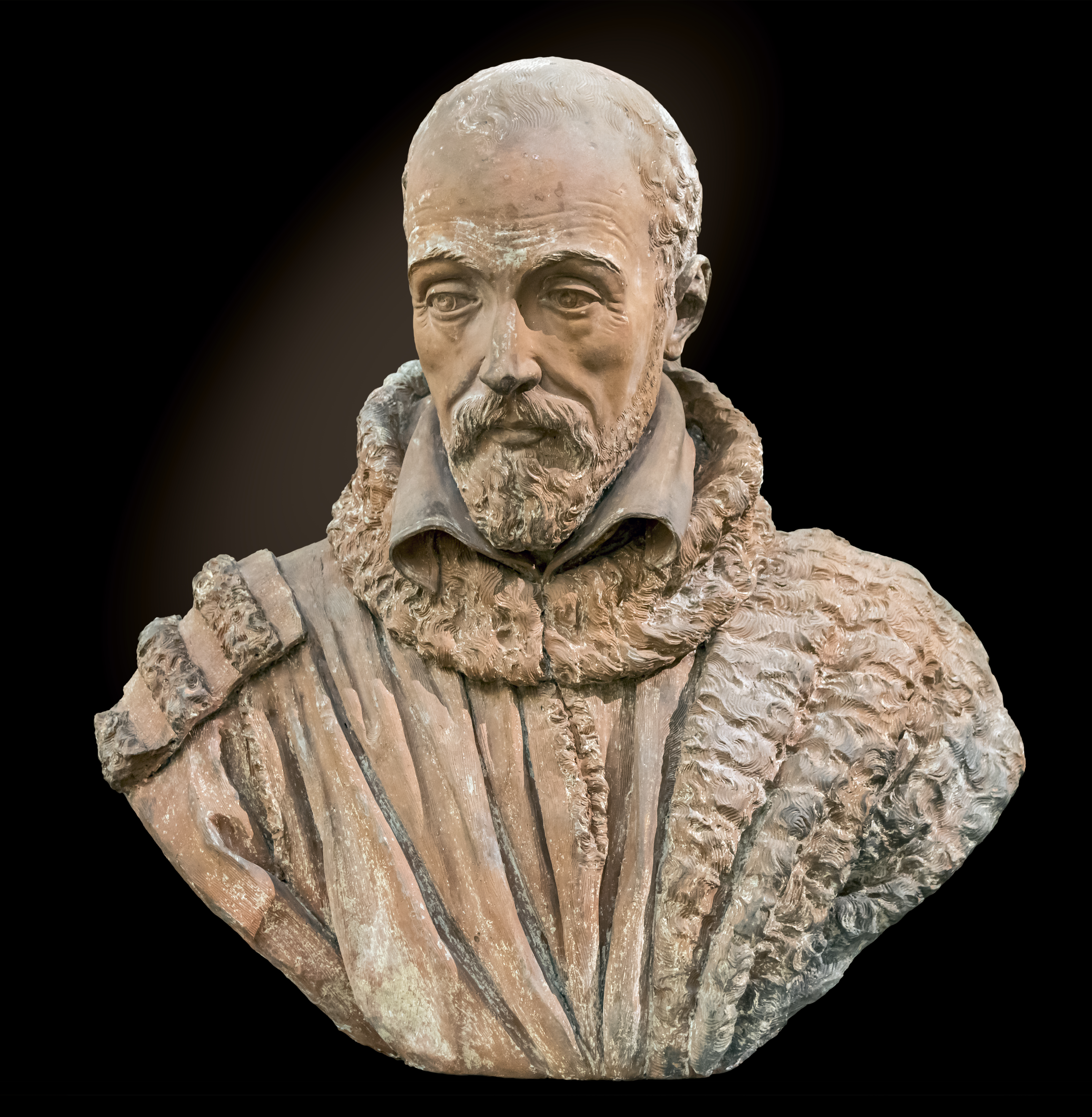
Philippe de Bertier, c. 1674, for the Hall of Illustrious.

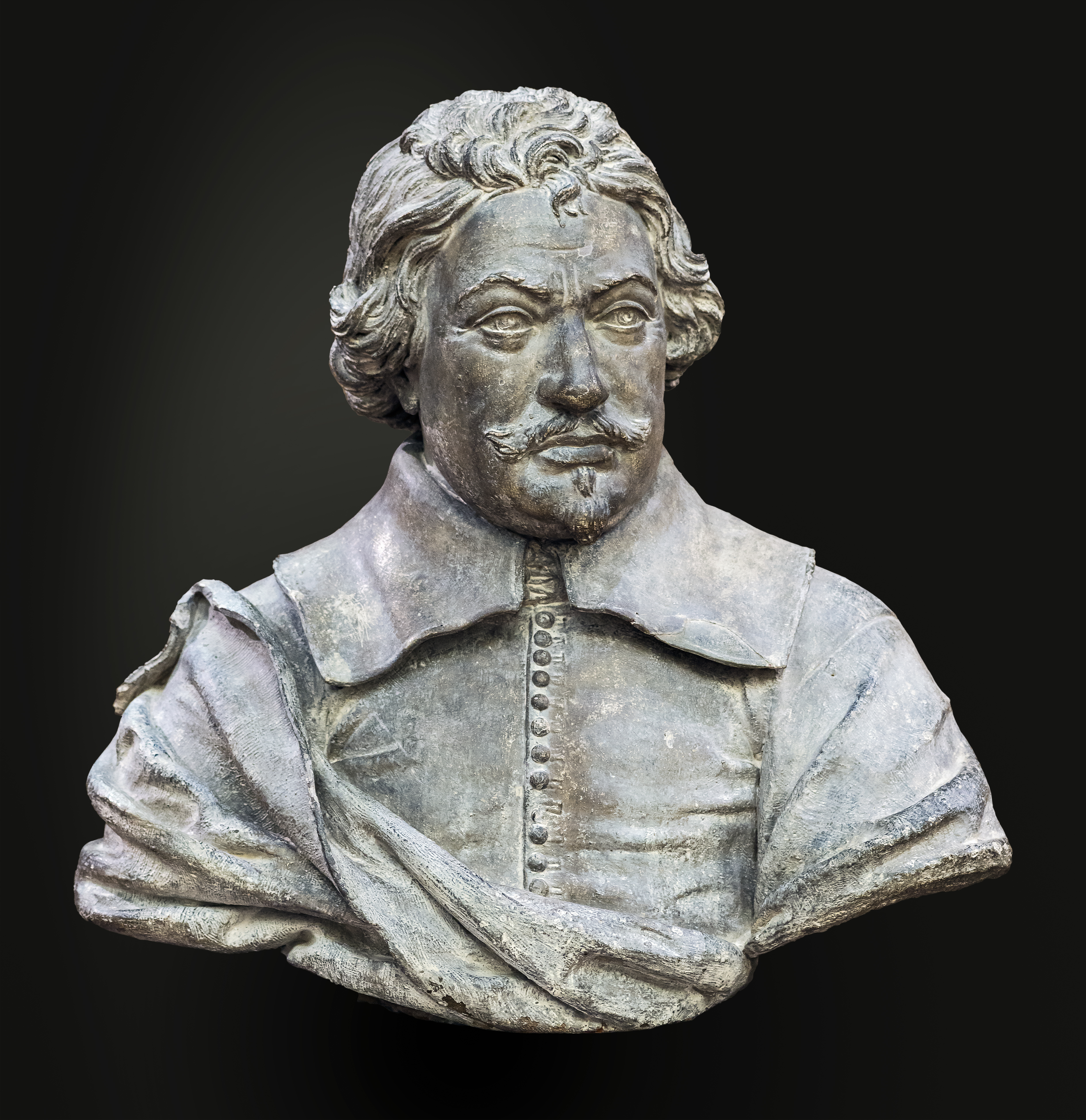
Pèire Godolin, made between 1674 and 1677 for the Hall of Illustrious.

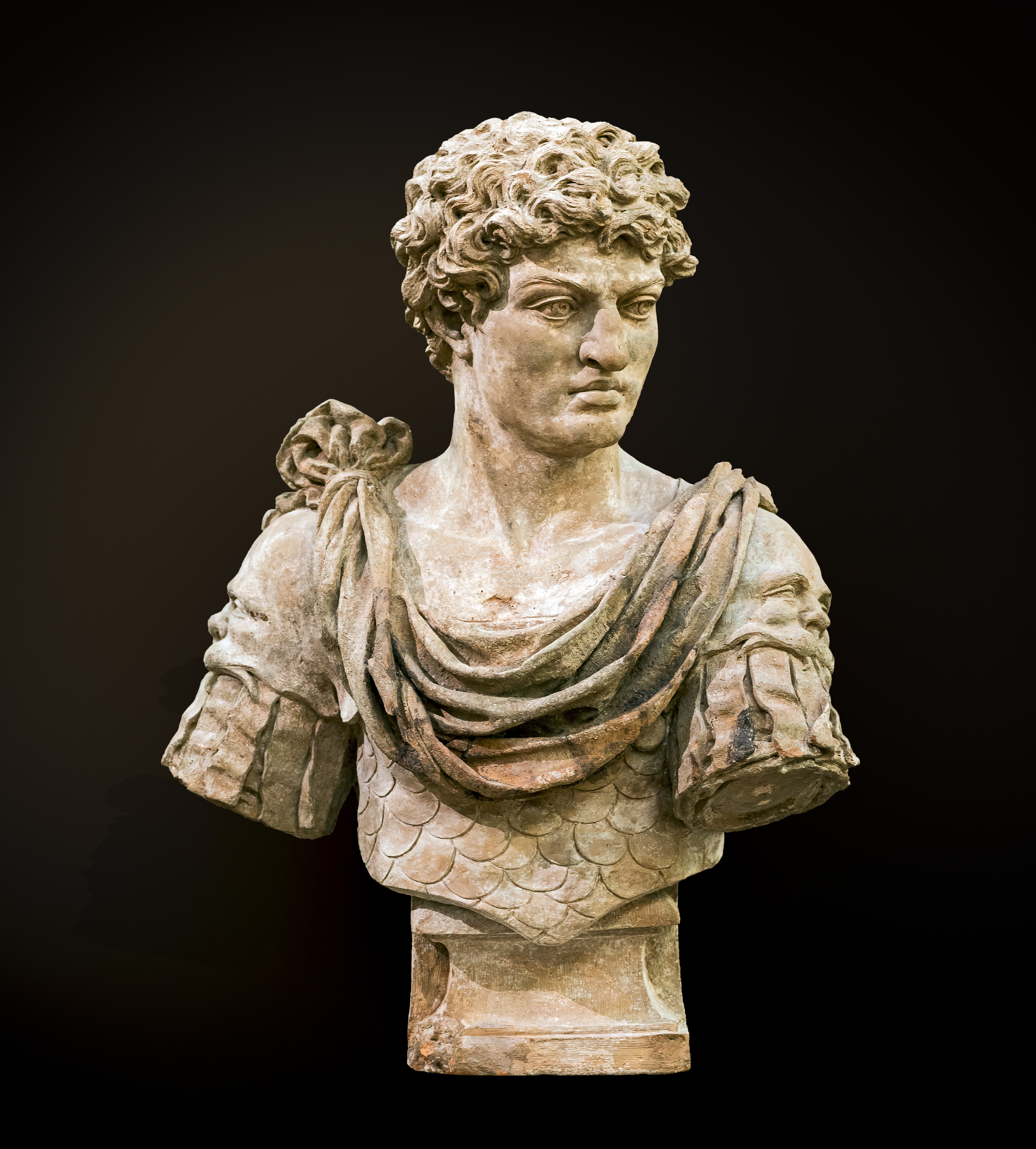
Marcus Antonius Primus, made between 1674 and 1677 for the Hall of Illustrious.

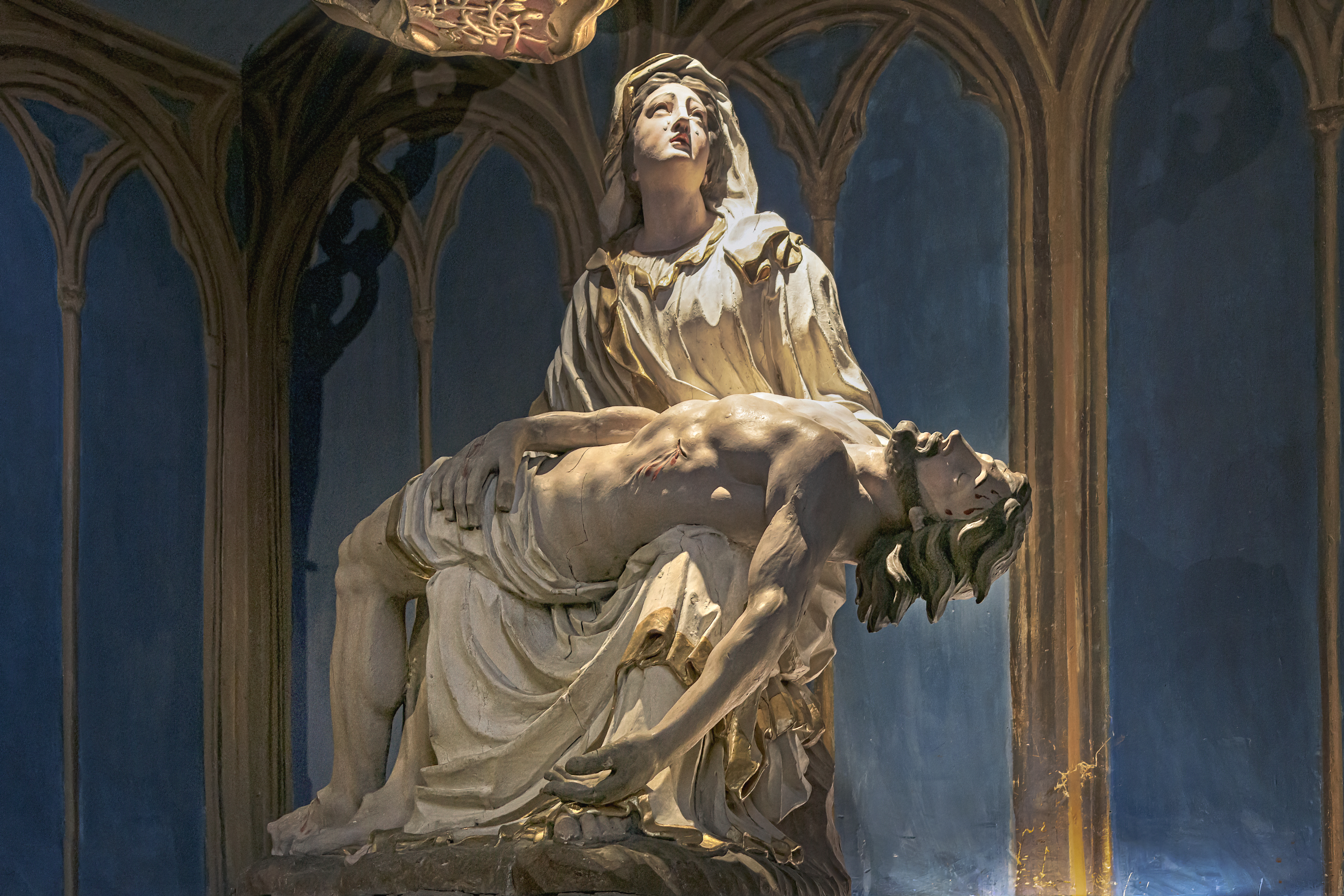
At the Cathédrale Saint-Alain de Lavaur.

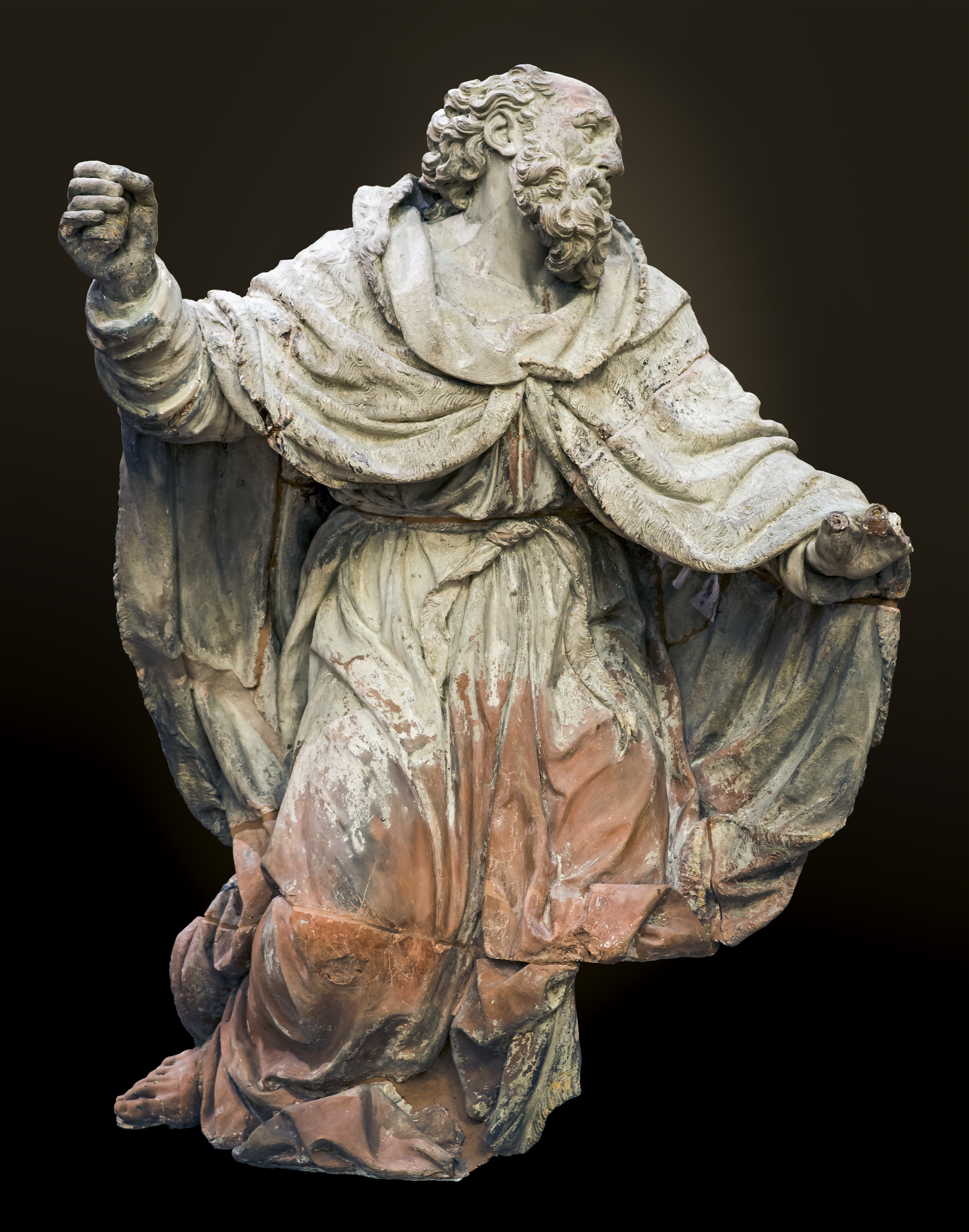
Elijah, c. 1690 for Notre-Dame du Mont-Carmel.

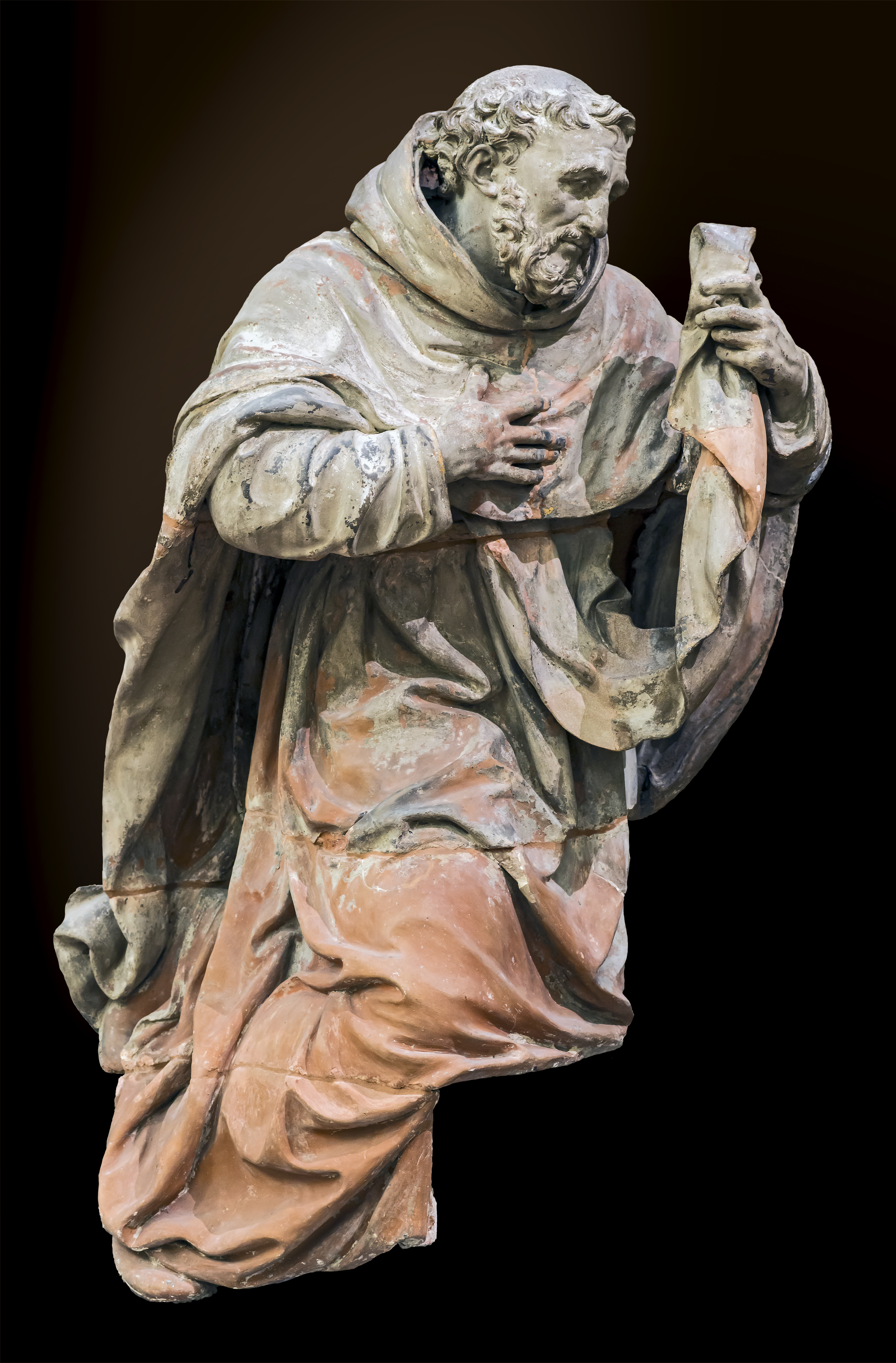
Simon Stock, c. 1690 for Notre-Dame du Mont-Carmel.

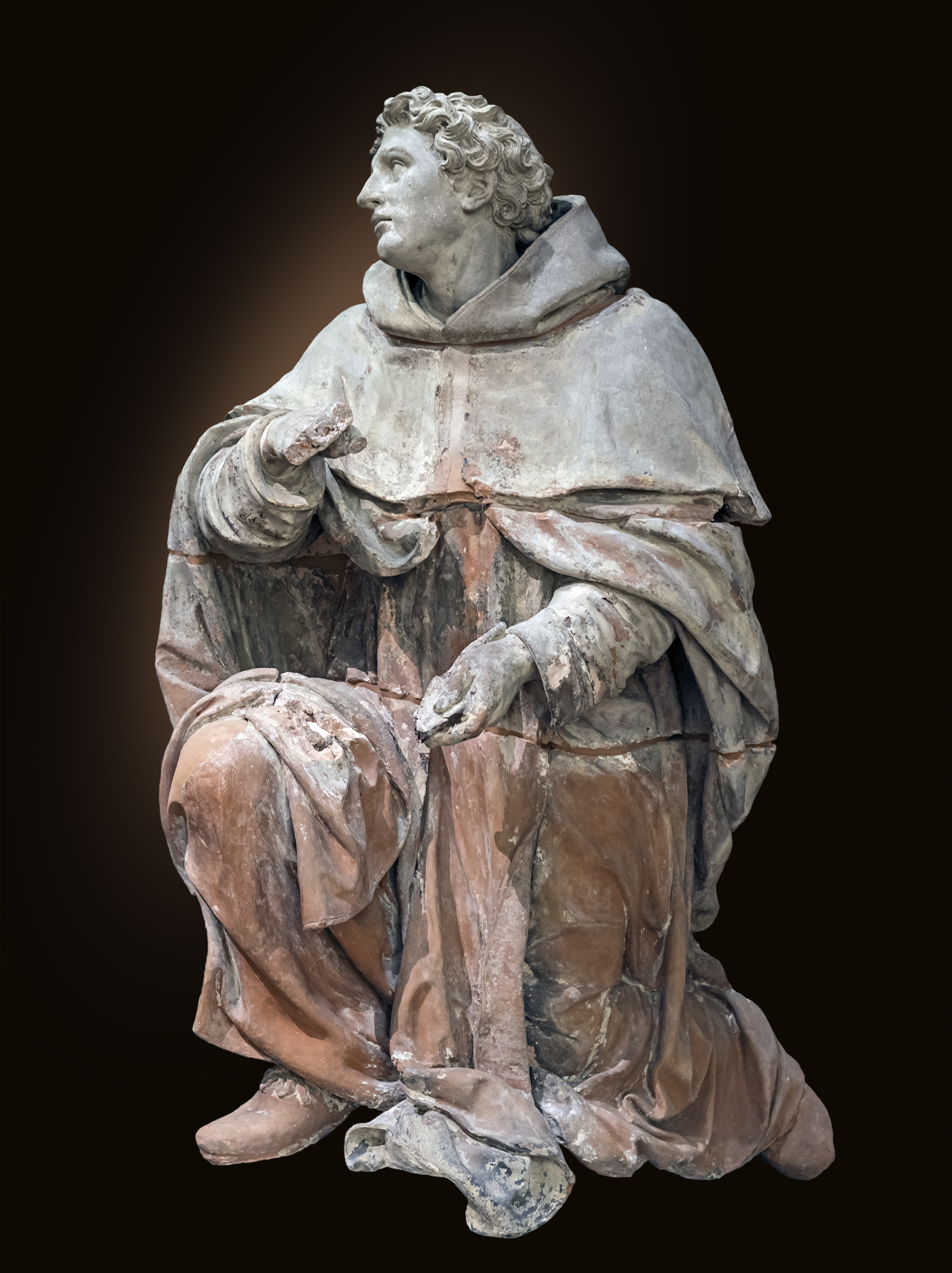
Agabus, c. 1690 for Notre-Dame du Mont-Carmel.

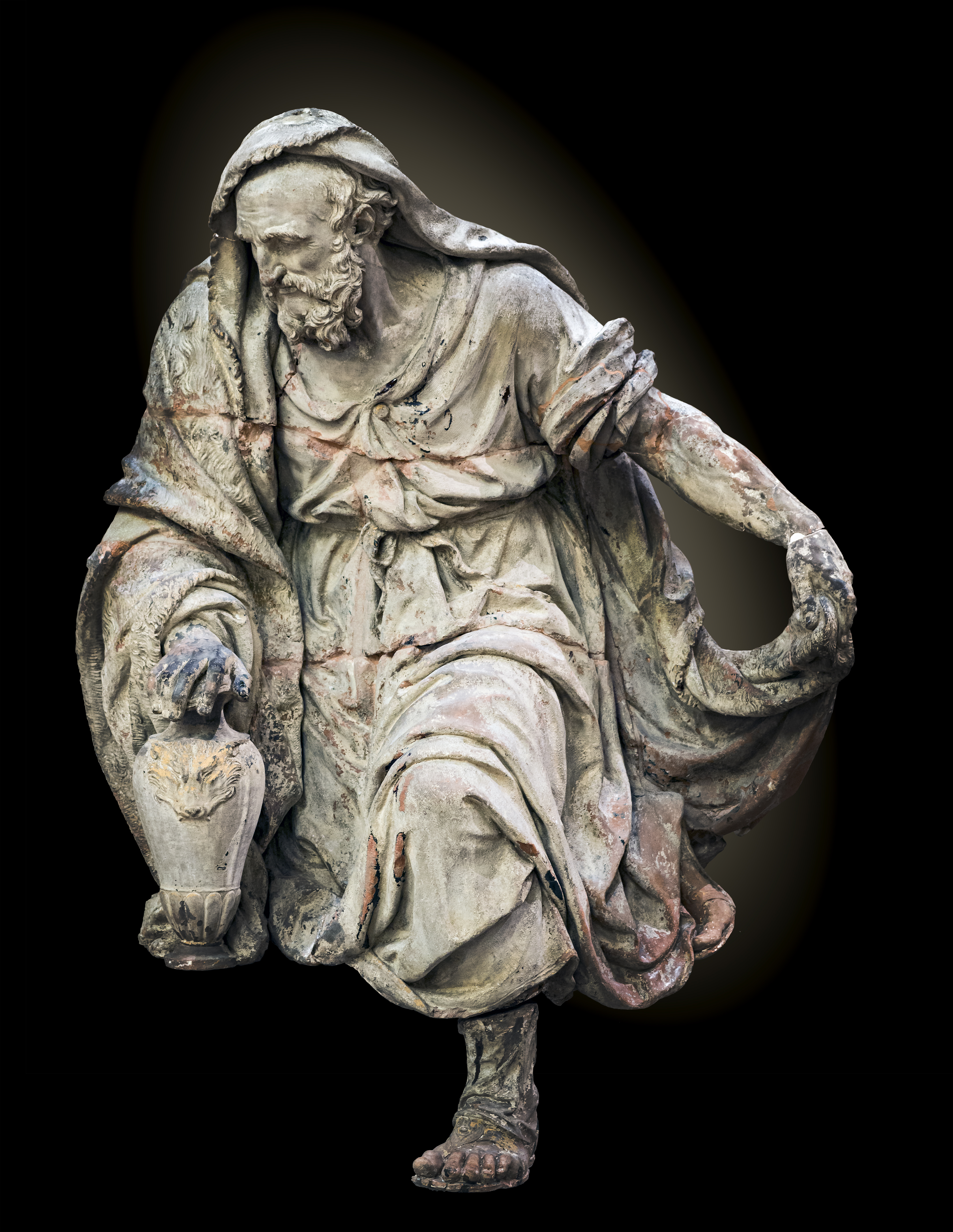
Elisha, c. 1690 for Notre-Dame du Mont-Carmel.

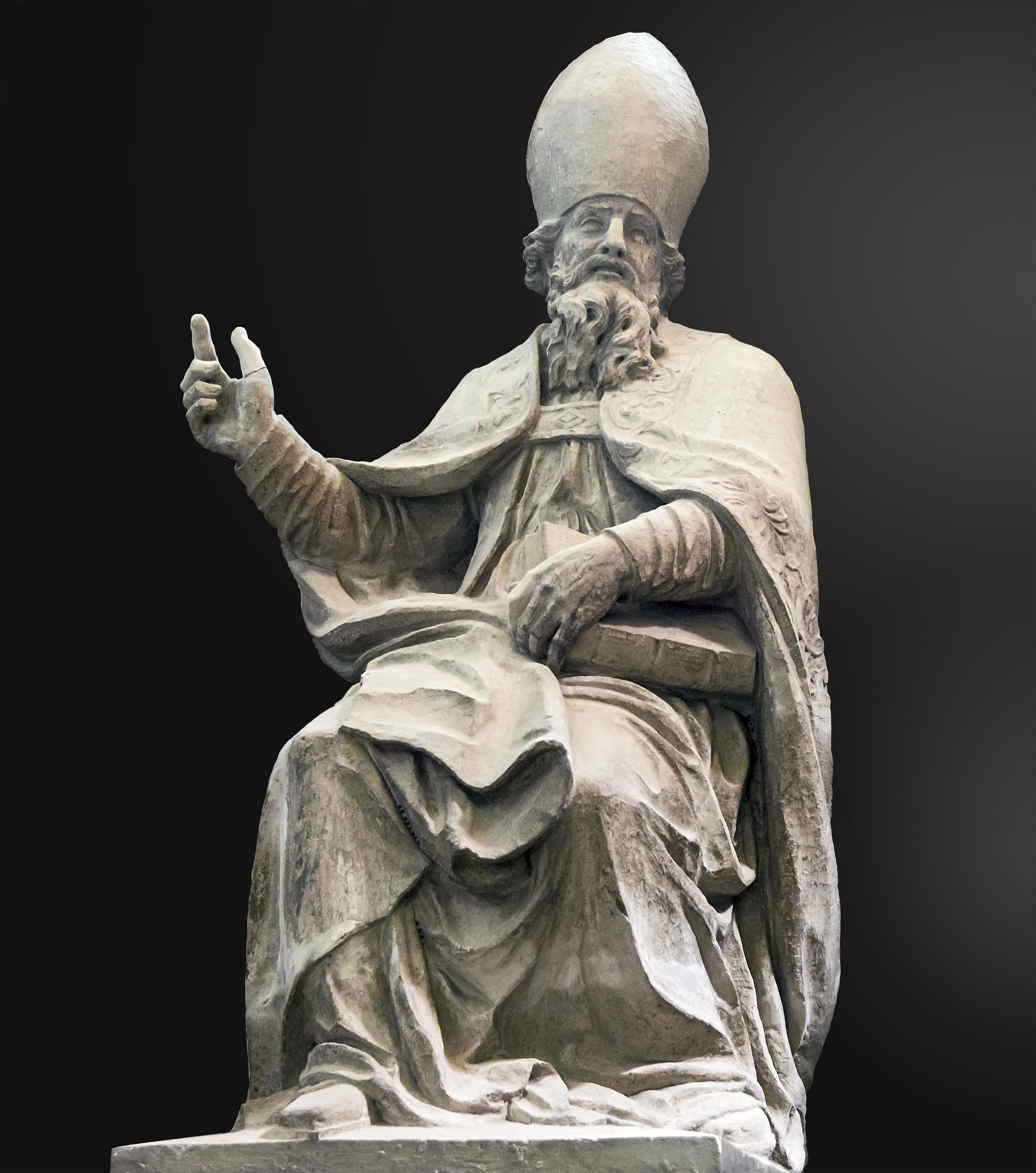
Ambrose, Montauban Cathedral.

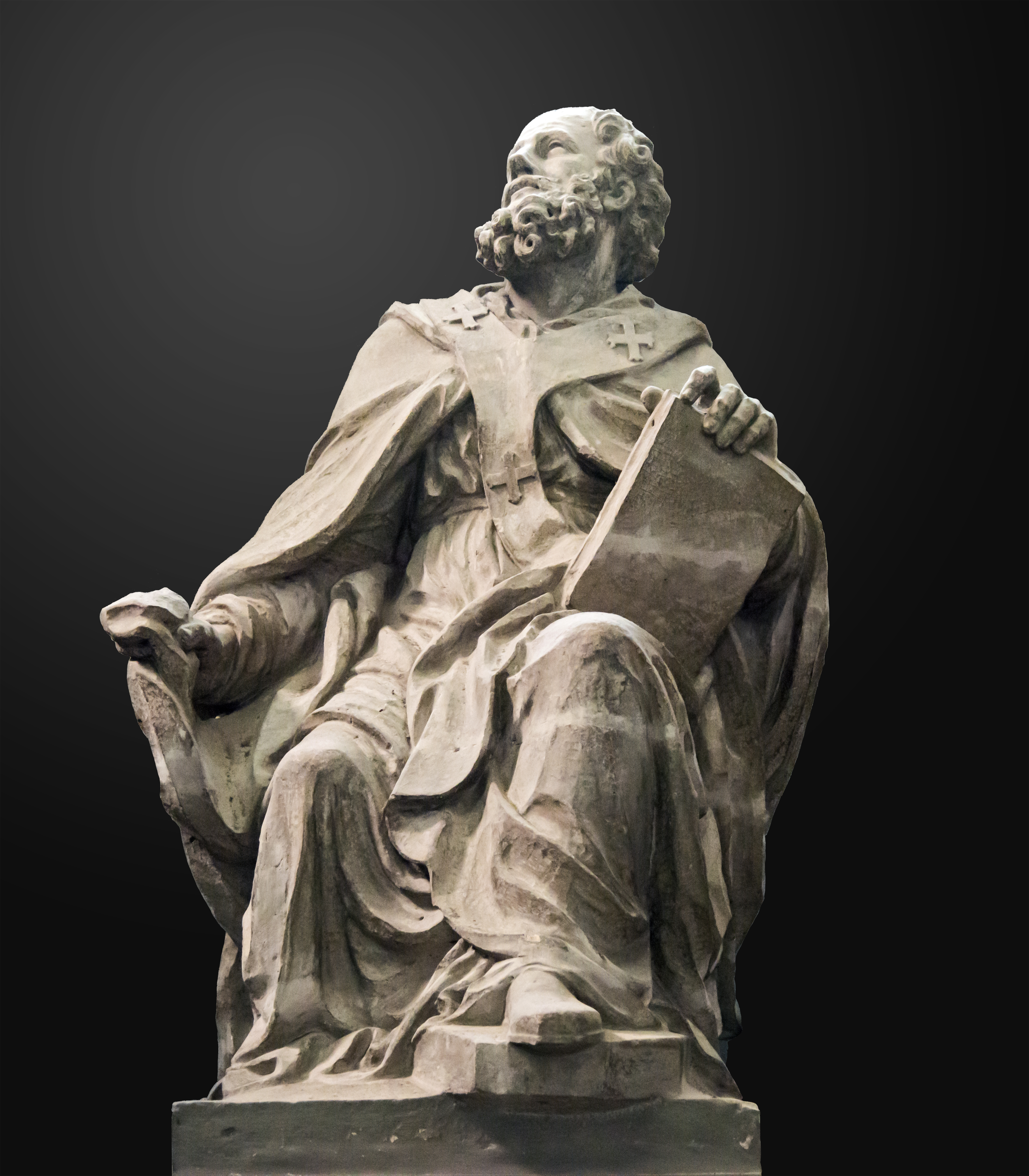
Augustine, Montauban Cathedral.
