= Joannes van der Brugghen =

Flemish painter, engraver, art dealer and publisher

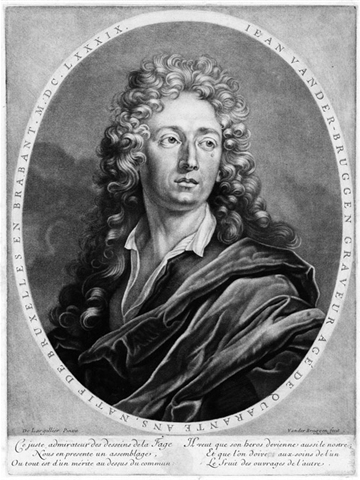
Portrait of Joannes van der Brugghen, engraved by himself after a painting by Nicolas de Largillière (1689).

Joannes van der Brugghen, known in French as Jean vander Bruggen, (1639 – c. 1740) was a Flemish painter, engraver, art dealer and publisher who was active in Antwerp and Paris.

== Life ==
Joannes van der Brugghen engraved a self-portrait printed in Paris in 1689. The print states (natif de Bruxelles en Brabant, M.D.C.XXXIX) that he was born in 1639 in Brussels. It is not clear with whom he trained, but he is registered as a master in the Antwerp Guild of St. Luke in 1679. In 1681 he moved to Paris, open a shop rue Saint-Jacques, where he was active as an engraver, dealer and publisher.

The artist was a great admirer of Raymond Lafage, a French artist who is notable for his mythological prints and drawings. This admiration is expressed in a poem at the bottom of his engraved self-portrait. The poem was written (in part) by the famous French author Jean de La Fontaine. The self-portrait was made after a painting by Nicolas de Largillière. It was part of a set of prints after designs by Lafage that van der Brugghen published that year in memory of Lafage and sold from his house in Paris. The title of the work was Recueil des meilleurs desseins de Raimond La Fage gravé par cinq des plus habiles graveurs : Et mis en lumière par les soins de Vander-Bruggen (Collection of the best designs of Raimond La Fage engraved by five of the most skilled engravers: And published through the efforts of Vander-Bruggen).

It is not known when or where the artist died. The time of his death is estimated to be some time after 1693.
