= Antoine Rivalz =

French painter (1667–1735)

- Born: 1667; Toulouse, Languedoc
- Died: December 11, 1735 (aged 67–68)
- Occupation: Painter
- Father: Jean-Pierre Rivalz

Antoine Rivalz (1667 – 11 December 1735) was a French painter. Born in Toulouse, Languedoc, the son of Jean-Pierre Rivalz (who painted and designed the city's hôtel de ville), Antoine became the town's official painter, and was a talented portraitist of the society of the city in the 18th century. He also produced a large number of drawings.

== Life ==
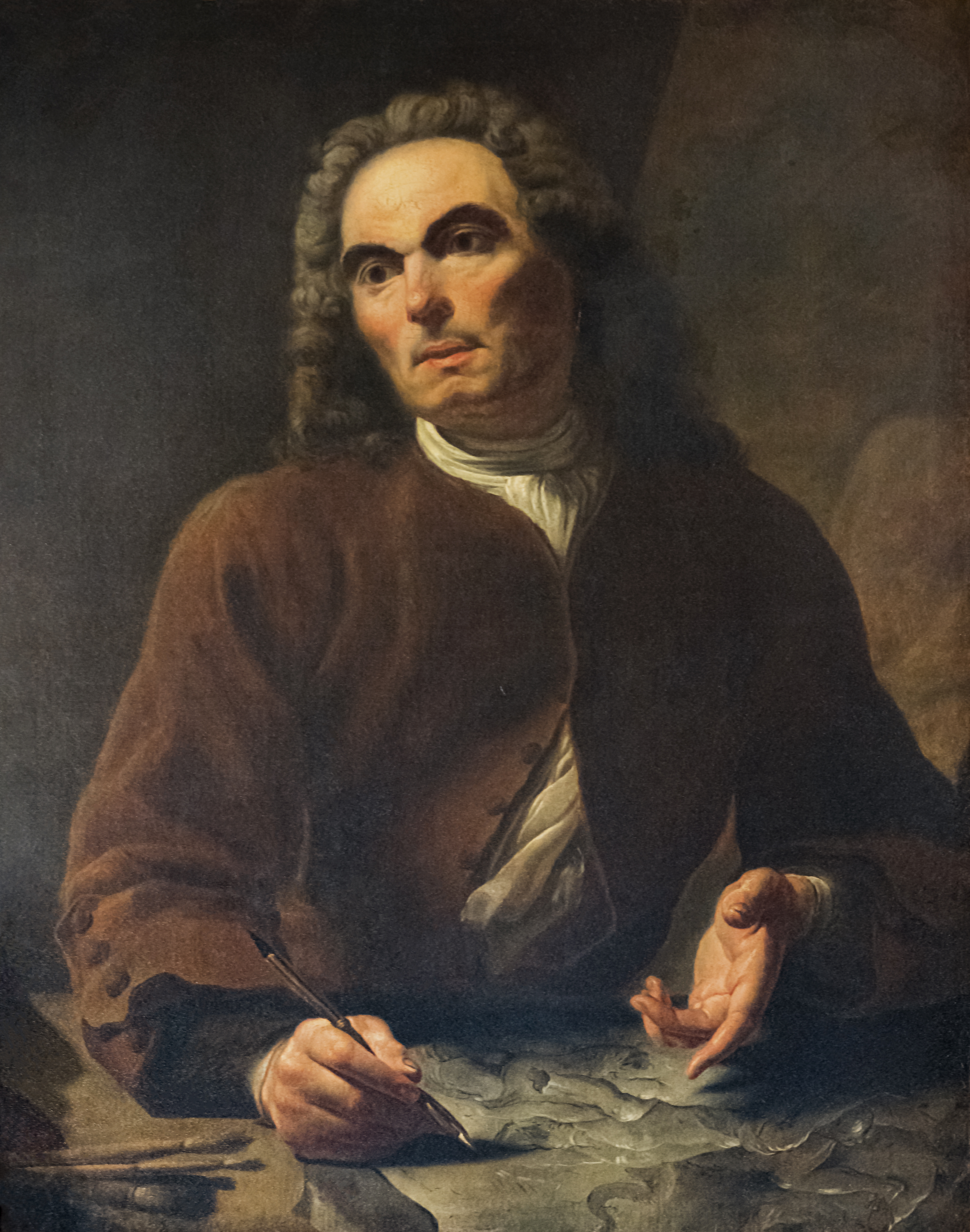
Self-portrait in 1721

Antoine Rivalz began his training in the studios of his father Jean-Pierre, the sculptor Marc Arcis and the artist Raymond Lafage. In his training, he was particularly interested in studying classical works and the Baroque Italian masters. From 1685 to 1687 he trained at the Académie royale de peinture et de sculpture in Paris. On his return to Toulouse he received his first two commissions. In 1687 he set out for Rome, where he stayed for more than ten years. In 1694 he won second prize at the Accademia di San Luca with a drawing of The fall of the giants, with first prize going to Antonio Balestra and Felice Nardi. In Rome he became friends with other artists such as Carlo Maratta, Luigi Garzi and Benedetto Luti, and was more and more in demand for commissions from families in both Rome and Toulouse.

In 1703, he returned to Toulouse and was made painter of the city's hôtel de ville, a post he held until his death. Supported by an important studio, he received a large number of commissions – commemorative paintings, paintings of ordinance and armour, architectural projects, restorations. This post, however, allowed him above all to forge productive relations with the city's upper classes and benefit from a near-monopoly on public, religious and private commissions in the city.

He married his first cousin Louise Rivalz, with whom he had six children, including the future artist Pierre Rivalz, known as the "chevalier Rivalz". In 1726 he set up Toulouse's first art school and in 1750 letters patent from Louis XV turned it into the Académie royale de peinture et de sculpture de Toulouse, the only one in France (after that in Paris) to be allowed to bear that title.

== His œuvre ==
Rich from the varied training he had received in Toulouse, Paris and Rome, he created an original and varied style influenced by Baroque painting, classical art, 17th-century painting styles and the inheritance of the Italian masters. For instance, his work on the door of a Pharmacy presents the same subject of the Italian "Pestapepe", usually referred to Melozzo da Forlì. He produced a personal synthesis of them and revived the artistic life of Toulouse, choosing an aesthetic that was resolutely turned towards the 17th century, and resisted the innovations of Parisian painting. His influence and his official position allowed him to influence a whole generation of 18th-century artists, creating an artistic unity which left a mark on the Toulouse painting school. After his death, his work and style was perpetuated by students such as Guillaume Cammas and Pierre Subleyras, but at the start of the 19th century his work became fell out of fashion for more than a hundred years, only being fully rediscovered from the 1940s onwards.

=== Selected works ===
- Six monumental canvases from a grand history cycle on the history of Toulouse
  - King Antiochus defeated by the Tectosages
  - Raymond of Saint-Gilles taking the cross
  - Defeat of Henry Plantagenet before the walls of Toulouse
  - Expulsion of the Huguenots
- Two landscapes :
  - Birth of the duke of Brittany
  - Foundation of Ancyre
- Two views
  - La Naissance du duc de Bretagne
  - Foundation of Ankara
- La chute des anges rebelles in Narbonne
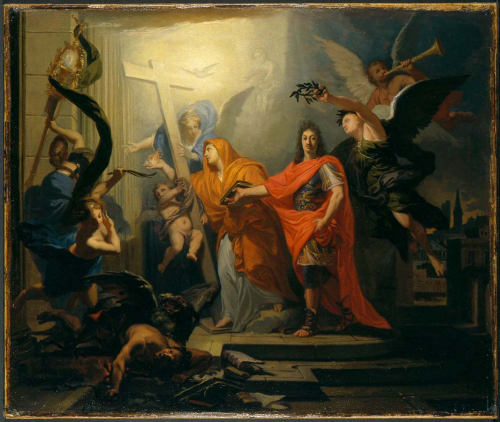
Antoine Rivalz, Peace of Utrecht, ca. 1714, oil on canvas. Metropolitan Museum of Art, New York

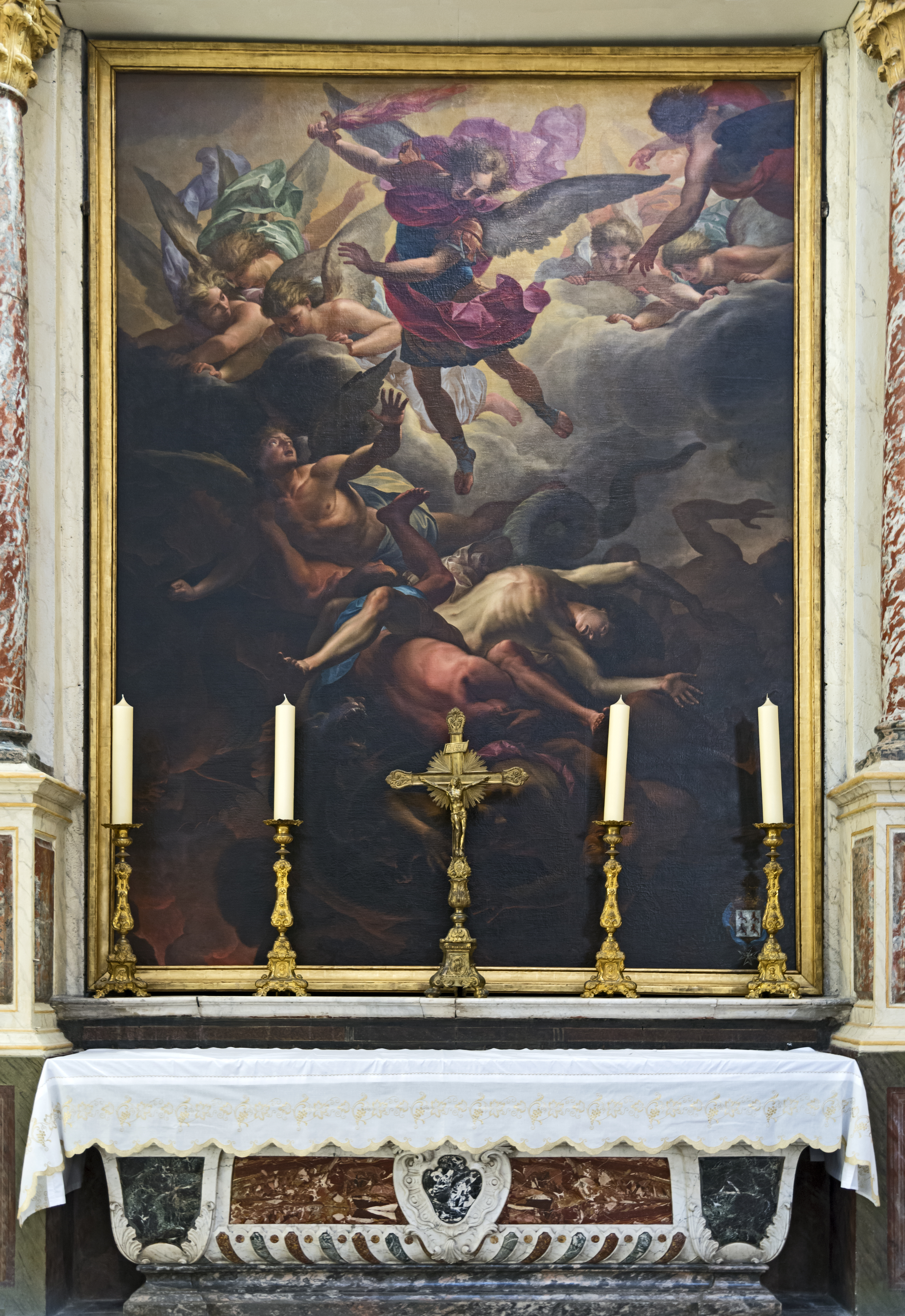
La chute des anges rebelles Narbonne

== Sources ==
- (in French) Thesis on the maps school by Valérie Néouze
