= Auger Ferrier =

French astrologer

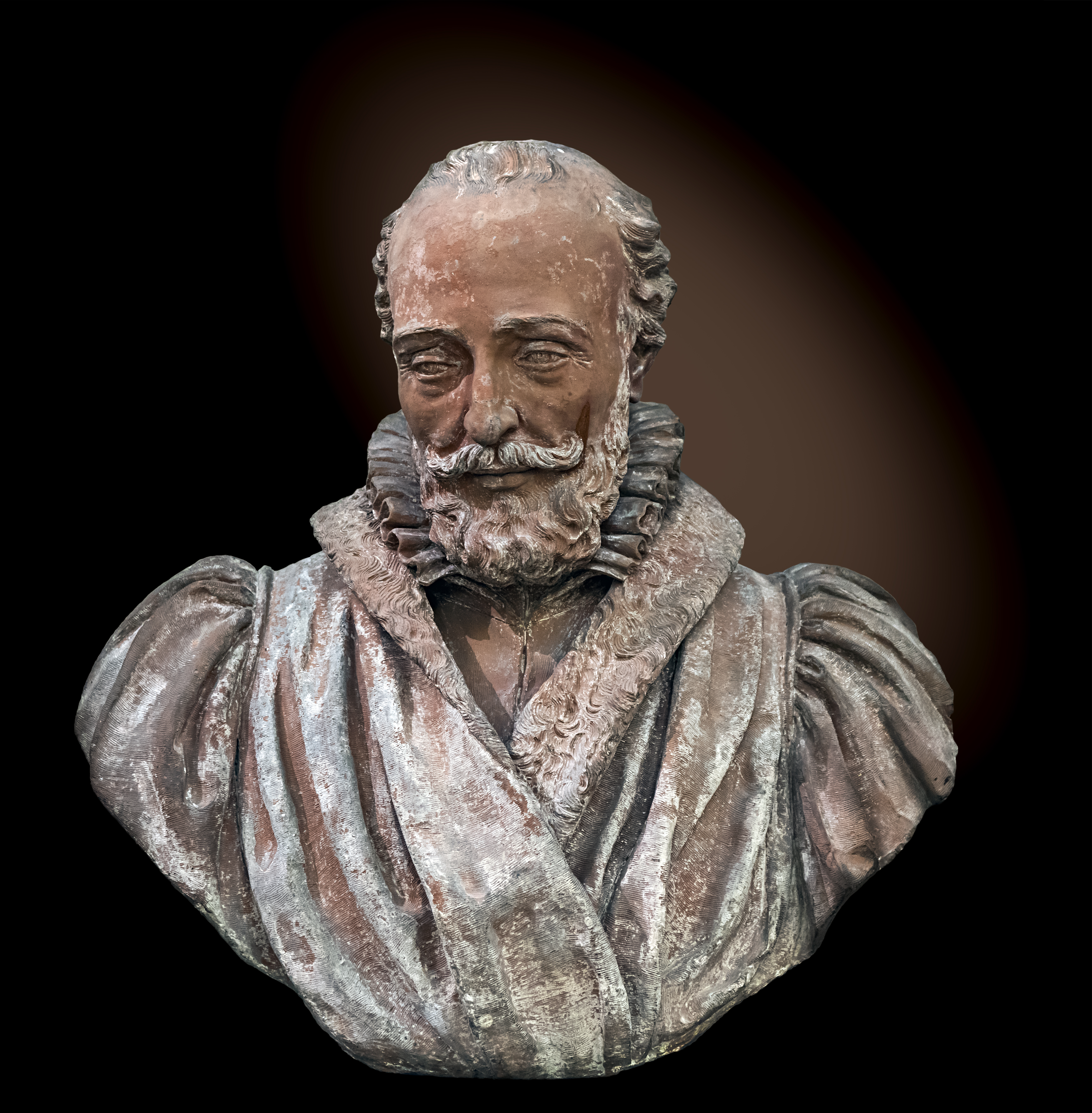
Auger Ferrier by Marc Arcis

Auger Ferrier (1513–1588) was a French physician, known also as an astrologer, poet, and interpreter of dreams.

== Life ==
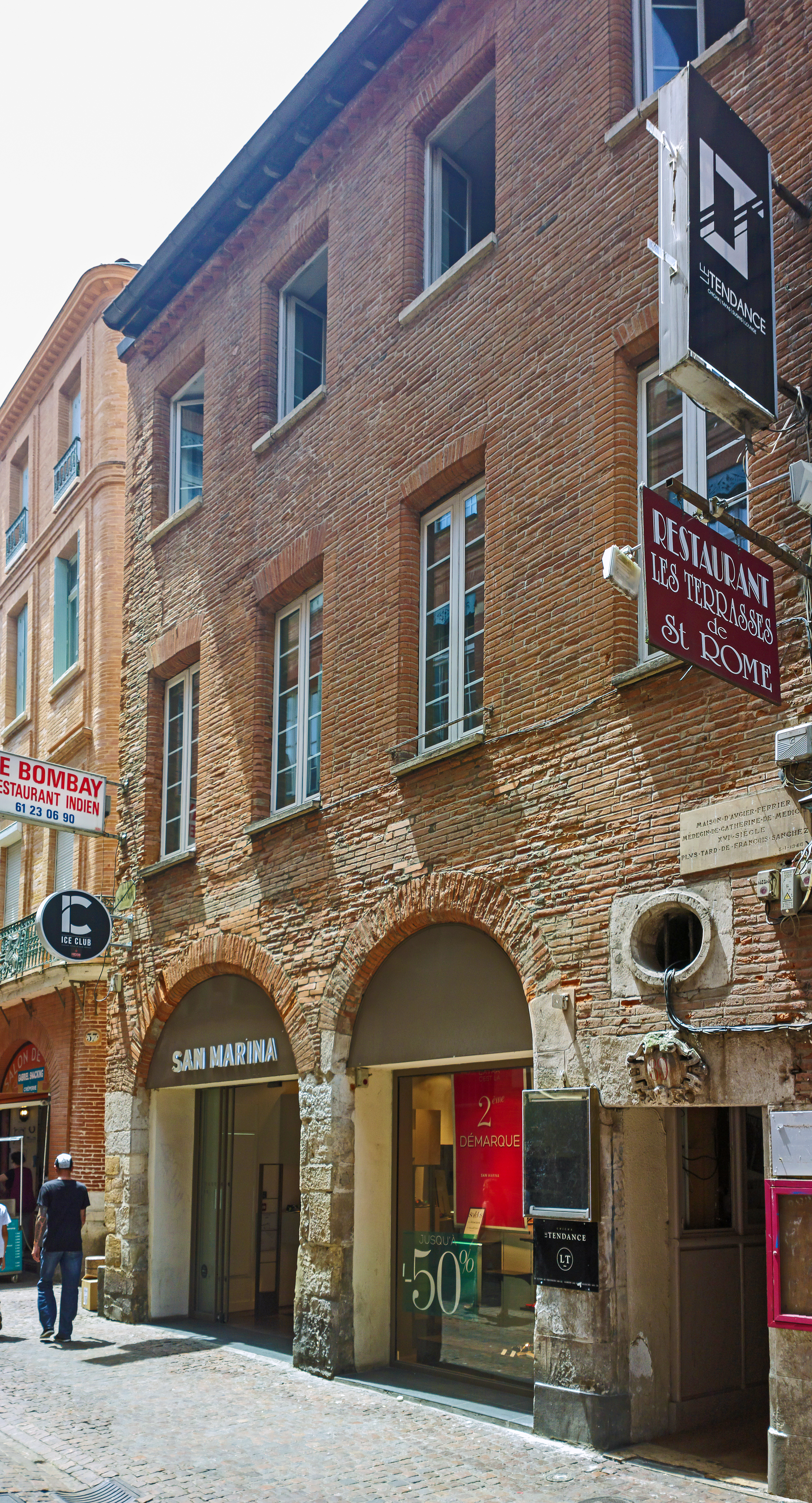
This house in Toulouse

He was born near Toulouse, and educated by his father, a surgeon. He studied medicine with the law and mathematics. He took a medical degree at the University of Montpellier in 1540, under Jean Schyron. He was particularly interested in judicial astrology.

He went to Paris, where he made his way rapidly. Cardinal Bertrand presented him to Catherine de Medici, who made him physician in ordinary. He was a success in Rome, also, and befriended Julius Caesar Scaliger.

Settling finally in Toulouse, Ferrier fell into a sharp controversy with Jean Bodin, over his Six Livres de la République, when Ferrier answered a slight in Avertissement à Jean Bodin sur le quatrième livre de sa République. Aged 75, he died of an intestinal complaint.

== Works ==
- De diebus decretoriis secundum Pythagoricam doctrinam et astronomicam observationem, Leyden, 1541, 1549, in-16; reproduced on microfilm in the 1549 edition, Cambridge (Mass.), Omnisys, 1990, 153 p.
- Remèdes préservatifs et curatifs de la peste, Lyon, 1548, 93 p.
- Liber de Somniis, Leyden, 1549, in-16, with treatises of Hippocrates, Galen and Synesius on insomnia; republished in Toulouse, no date, 95 p. This was the longest treatment of dreams, in the Western European tradition, since Albertus Magnus.
- Jugements astronomiques sur les nativités, Lyon, 1550, 220 p.; Rouen, 1583, 248 p.
- De Pudendagra, lue Hispanica, libri duo, Toulouse, 1553, in-12, often reprinted; De Lue hispanica sive morbo gallico, Paris, 1564, 122 p. On syphilis.
- De radice chinœ liber, quo probatur diversam esse ab apio, Toulouse, 1554, in-8°.
- Vera medendi methodus, duobus libris comprehensa. Castigationes medicinæ, Toulouse, 1557, in-8°; Leyde; 1574, 1602, in-8°.
- Advertissemens à M. Jean Bodin sur le quatriesme livre de sa République, Paris, 1580, in-8°, 71 p.
