= Louis Peter Boitard =

French engraver and designer

Louis Philippe Boitard (fl. 1733–1767) was a French engraver and designer, who worked in London.

== Life ==
He was probably born in France, and was a pupil of Raymond Lafage. His father François Boitard (1667–1719) brought him to England. The date of Louis Philippe Boitard's death is unknown, being stated by some authorities as 1758, by others as after 1760 or 1767. The earlier date seems much less likely. Indeed, a Louis Boitard was buried 30 September 1758 in the church of St Martin-in-the-Fields, London, but it is not known whether he has any relationship with the engraver.

== Works ==
He made engravings after Canaletto, Christophe Huet, Giovanni Paolo Pannini, and others. One of his best-known plates represents the Rotunda at Ranelagh Gardens, after Pannini. In 1747, he supplied forty-one large plates for Joseph Spence's Polymetis. He engraved the illustrations to John Gilbert Cooper's Life of Socrates (1749), Robert Paltock's The Life and Adventures of Peter Wilkins, a Cornish Man (1750), and Richard Owen Cambridge's Scribleriad (1751).

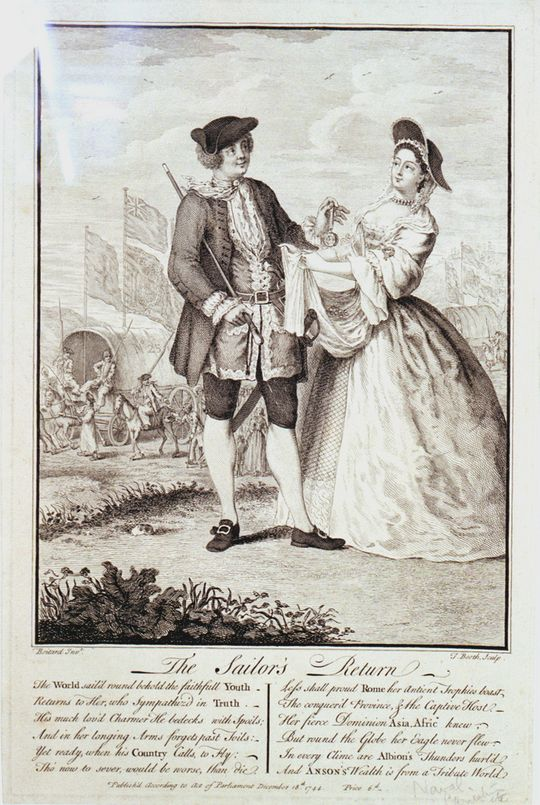
The Sailor's Return, 1744.

He executed many vignettes, designs, and portraits, among those one of Elizabeth Canning; and he is said to have been a humorist and a member of the Artists' Club.

== Family ==
His wife was English; and he had a son of the same name and profession.

== Notes ==
Attribution

This article incorporates text from a publication now in the public domain: Dobson, Henry Austin (1886). "Boitard, Louis Peter". In Stephen, Leslie (ed.). Dictionary of National Biography. Vol. 5. London: Smith, Elder & Co..
