= Charles Louis Simonneau =

French engraver

- Judith with the Head of Holofernes, engraved by Simonneau after Antoine Coypel, 1694, Rijksmuseum, Amsterdam
- Born: August 1645; Orléans, Kingdom of France
- Died: 22 March 1728 (aged 82); Paris, Kingdom of France
- Education: Noël Coypel; Guillaume Chasteau
- Occupation: Engraver

Charles Louis Simonneau (baptised 3 August 1645, Orléans, Orléanais – 22 March 1728, Paris), was a French painter and engraver.

== Biography ==
The first of a dynasty of engravers from Orléans, Charles Simonneau is known as Simonneau the Elder (or L'Ancien) to distinguish him from his younger brother, Louis. He began his apprenticeship in the studio of Noël Coypel, and from 1667 to 1671 he completed his studies under Guillaume Chasteau, engraver to the King and a member of the Académie des Beaux-Arts. Simonneau was admitted to the Académie des Beaux-Arts on 28 June 1710 with a portrait of Jules Hardouin-Mansart based on a painting by François de Troy. Shortly thereafter, he was appointed graveur ordinaire du Cabinet du Roi. Most of his engravings are based on works by renowned contemporary artists such as Charles Le Brun, Élisabeth Sophie Chéron, and Antoine Coypel. His style was greatly influenced by Sébastien Leclerc and Claude Duflos.

Simonneau's body of work is highly diverse. In collaboration with Bernard Picart, he produced an engraving of the funerary monument of Cardinal Richelieu in the Sorbonne Chapel in Paris, based on a design by François Girardon. He produced numerous frontispieces, notably for Marin Marais' Pièces en trio (1692), as well as vignettes, some of which he composed himself. He also contributed to the Recueil Crozat and the Recueil de la Galerie du Luxembourg. He also created engravings based on portraits by Hyacinthe Rigaud, including those of Antoine Anselme, Jean-Paul Bignon and Nicolas Mesnager. During his visit to France in 1717, Peter the Great commissioned Simonneau an engraving of the Battle of Lesnaya based on a painting by Pierre-Denis Martin. Simonneau was a great admirer of Raymond Lafage and collaborated to the Effigies Raymundi la Fage, a collection of prints and engravings dedicated to the French artist published in Paris in 1689..

== Gallery ==
The Continence of Scipio, engraved by Simonneau after Elisabeth Sophie Chéron, Rijksmuseum, Amsterdam

The Angel appearing to Hagar, engraved by Simonneau after Andrea Sacchi, 1700–28, Metropolitan Museum of Art, New York

Lot and his Daughters, engraved by Simonneau after Noël Coypel, Rijksmuseum, Amsterdam

The Virgin with Child, Elizabeth John the Baptist, engraved by Simonneau after Raphael, Rijksmuseum, Amsterdam

Ecce Homo, engraved by Simonneau after Antoine Coypel, 1700–28, National Gallery of Art, Washington, D.C.

Holy Face of Jesus, engraved by Simonneau after Domenico Fetti, Bibliothèque nationale de France, Paris

Funerary monument of Cardinal Richelieu, engraved by Simonneau after François Girardon, Rijksmuseum, Amsterdam

The Triumph of Galatea, engraved by Simonneau after Antoine Coypel, 1695, Rijksmuseum, Amsterdam
