= Jean-Pierre Rivalz =

French painter (1625–1706)

- Born: c. 1625; Labastide-d'Anjou, Saint-Papoul, France
- Died: May 17, 1706 (aged 80–81); Toulouse, France
- Known for: Painting
- Spouse: Perette de Caillavel
- Children: 10 (including Antoine Rivalz)

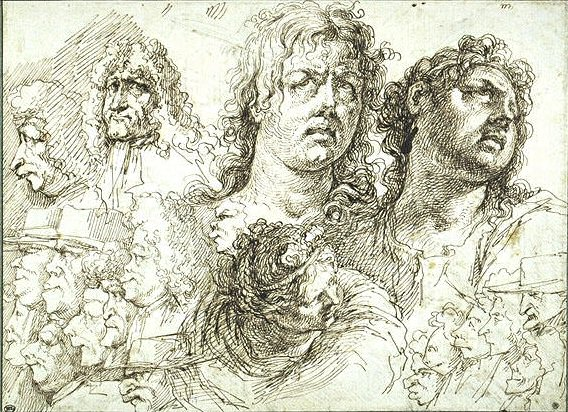
Caricatures and studies of heads, Musée du Louvre

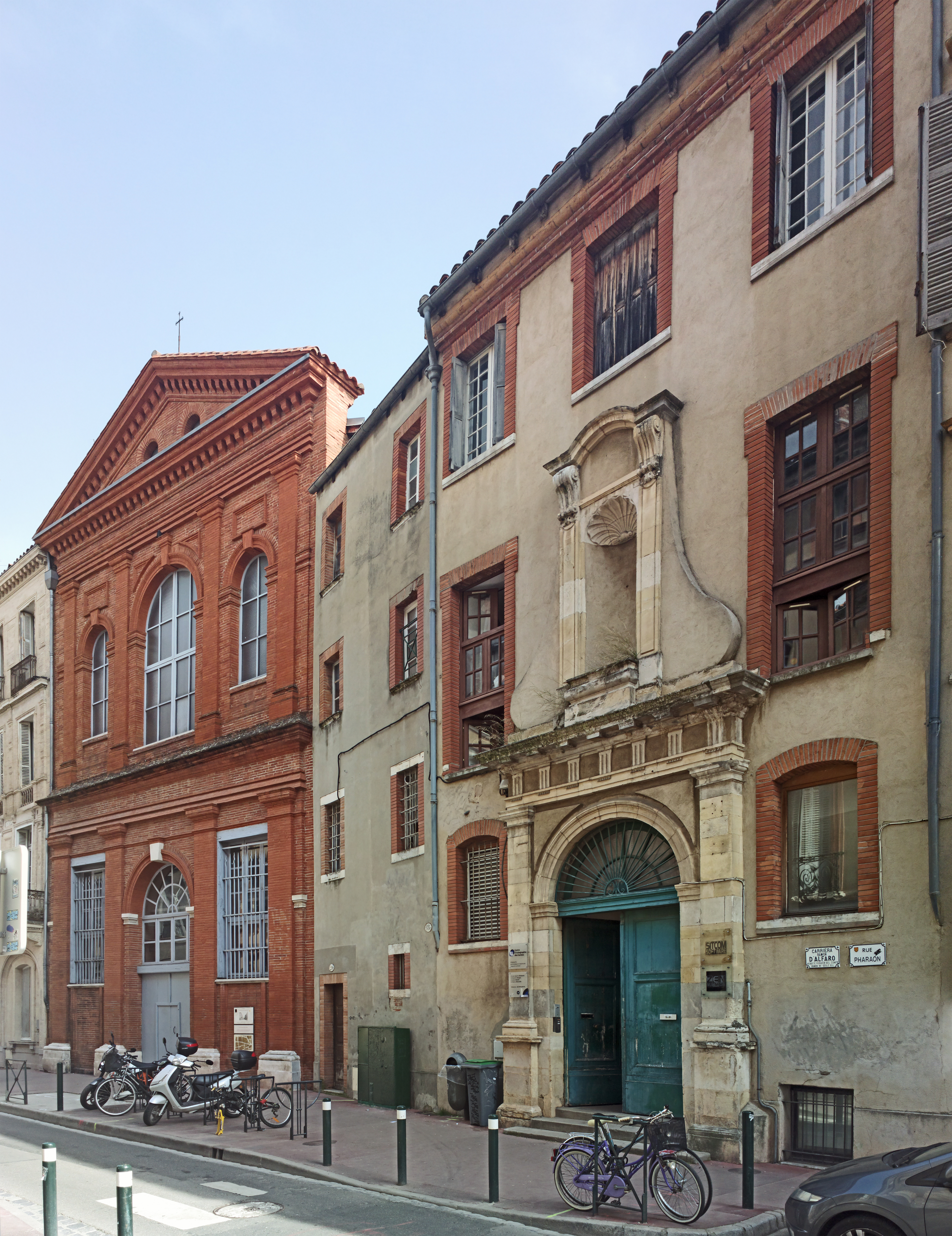
Ancien couvent des religieux de Saint-Antoine-du-Salin Toulouse

Jean-Pierre Rivalz (c. 1625 – 17 May 1706) was a French painter.

Rivalz was born in Labastide-d'Anjou, in the diocese of Saint-Papoul. A pupil of Ambroise Frédeau, in 1667 he was made an architect to the city of Toulouse. In 1666 he married Perette de Caillavel, by whom he had ten children, including the painter Antoine Rivalz. His pupil was the painter Raymond Lafage, who later taught his son Antoine. Rivalz died in Toulouse.

== Works ==
- Carmelite chapel in Toulouse : wall and ceiling painting
- Foundation of Ankara by the Tectosages – a mural ruined by humidity and saltpetre, his son Antoine was commissioned to repaint it in 1723
- Communion of the Virgin – painted for the church of the city's Carthusian monastery and now in the église Saint-Sernin de Toulouse.
- Allegorical portrait, Montpellier, musée Atger.
- Profiles, Paris, musée du Louvre.

== Architecture ==
- Ancien couvent des religieux de Saint-Antoine-du-Salin 18,20 rue Pharaon in Toulouse

== Bibliography ==
- (in French) Jean Penant, Antoine Rivalz, catalogue of the exhibition Antoine Rivalz, Toulouse, musée des Augustins, 2002.
