= François Boitard =

French artist

- Born: 1670; Toulouse, Languedoc, France
- Died: 1715 (aged 44–45); Amsterdam, Netherlands
- Occupation: Artist
- Movement: Baroque
- Children: Louis Peter Boitard

François Boitard (1670 – c.1715) was a French Baroque artist.

== Biography ==
Boitard was born in Toulouse, Languedoc. According to Houbraken he was a pupil of Raymond Lafage who later followed his style of making drawings and prints. He was able to attract a crowd in a tavern with his ingenious method of drawing a complicated version of the Pharaoh entering the Red Sea in two hours, from what appeared to be random scratches on a piece of paper. He copied this trick from Lafage, and Houbraken witnessed it himself in a tavern in London in 1709.

According to the RKD he lived in Rome during the 1680s and is registered in London in 1709. He drew many book illustrations and was the teacher of Jacques André Joseph Camellot Aved. The engraver Louis Peter Boitard was his son. He died in Amsterdam.
