= Raymond Lafage =

French artist

- Born: 1656; Lisle-sur-Tarn, France
- Died: 1684 (aged 27–28); Toulouse, France
- Occupation: Artist
- Known for: Mythological prints and drawings
- Movement: Baroque

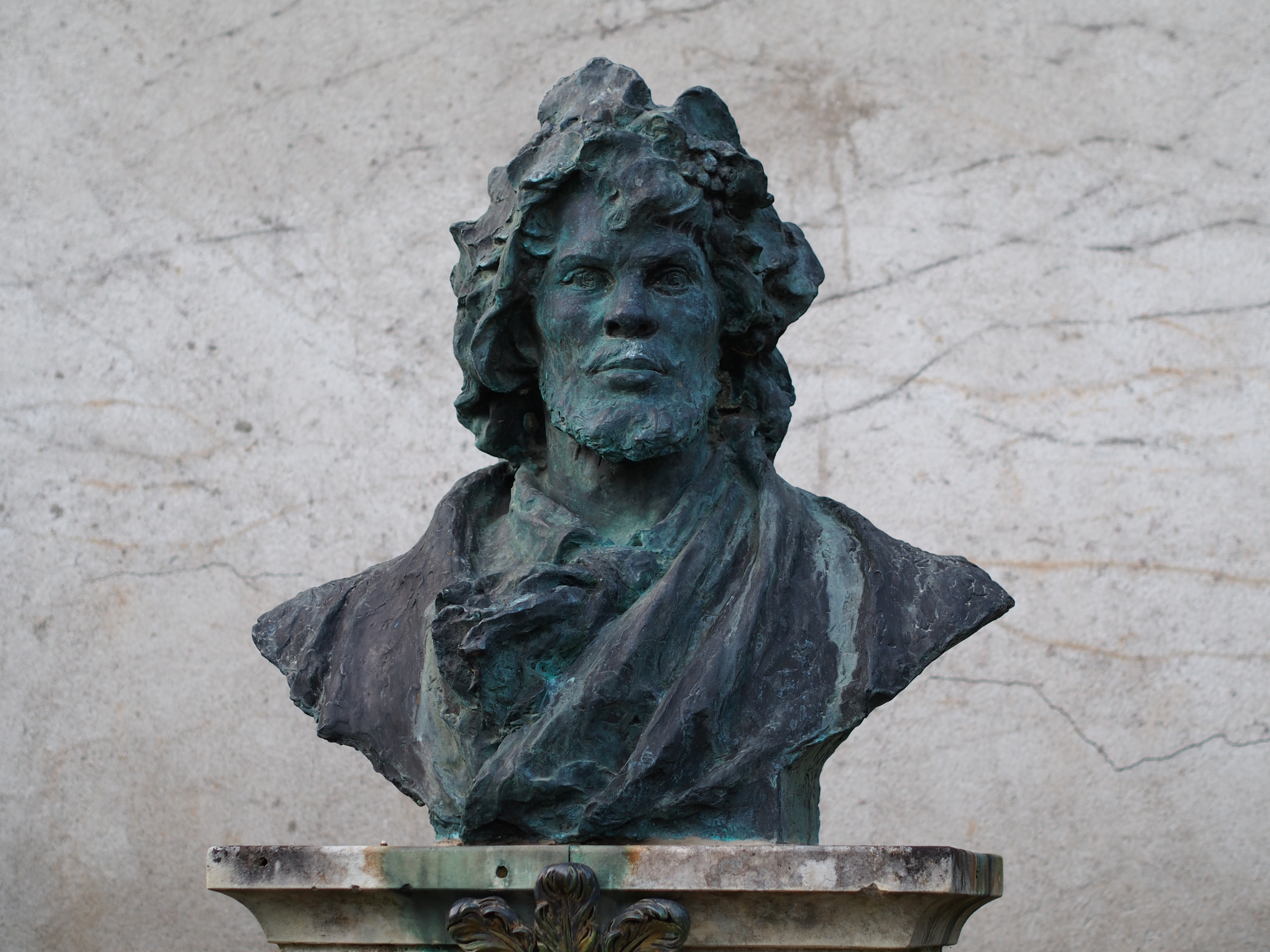
Bust of Raymond Lafage by Jan van der Brugge at Lisle-sur-Tarn.

Raymond Lafage (1656–1684) was a Baroque French artist, notable for his mythological prints and drawings.

== Biography ==
According to the RKD he was a student of Jean-Pierre Rivalz, and in turn he taught that painter's son Antoine Rivalz, and the painter François Boitard. He travelled to Italy to make drawings after Italian masters, and is registered as having worked in Toulouse. He planned a second sojourn in Italy, but died en route in Lyon.

According to Houbraken he was able to draw a crowd in a tavern with his ingenious method of drawing a complicated version of the Pharaoh entering the red sea in two hours, from what appeared to be random scratches on a piece of paper. His student Boitard could repeat this trick, but not quite as well. Houbraken became familiar with his other work through the prints published by Jan van der Brugge, who made a series titled "Effigies Raymundi la Fage" with engravings by Cornelis Vermeulen, Gérard Audran, Franz Ertinger, and Charles Louis Simonneau. This series was later published in Amsterdam in 1785 by Jacob Yntema.
