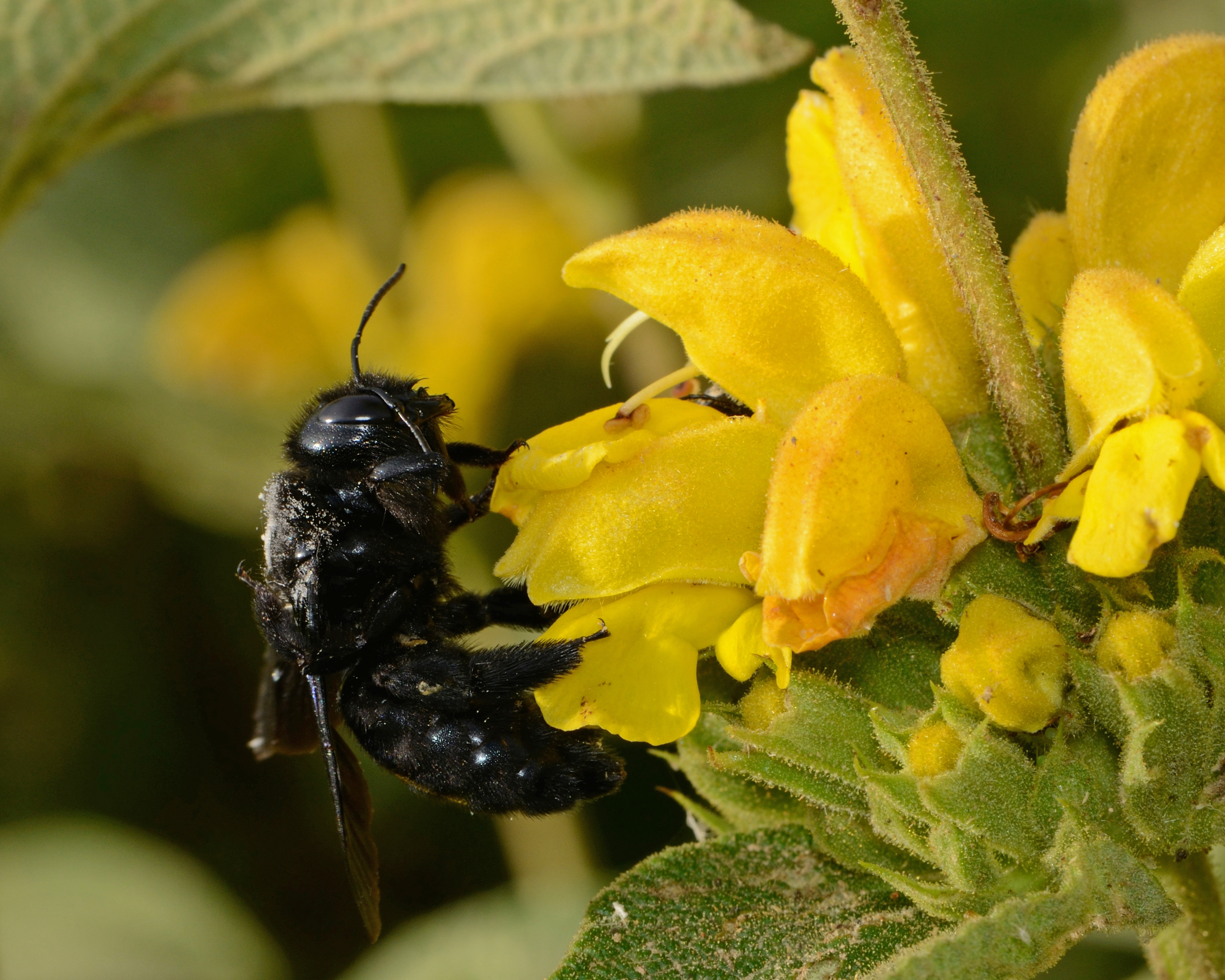
- Female X. violacea on Phlomis viscosa

Scientific classification
- Kingdom: Animalia
- Phylum: Arthropoda
- Clade: Pancrustacea
- Class: Insecta
- Order: Hymenoptera
- Family: Apidae
- Genus: Xylocopa
- Species: X. violacea

Binomial name
- Xylocopa violacea (Linnaeus, 1758)

Synonyms
- Apis insubrica Müller, 1766; Xylocopa femorata Fabricius, 1804

= Xylocopa violacea =

Species of bee

Xylocopa violacea, the violet carpenter bee, is the common European species of carpenter bee, and one of the largest bees in Europe. It is also native to Asia.

Like most members of the genus Xylocopa, it makes its nests in dead wood. It is not particularly aggressive, and will attack only if forced to.

== Distribution ==
The range of Xylocopa violacea extends from Europe eastward across Asia as far as central China, restricted to latitudes above 30 degrees.

In 2006, Xylocopa violacea was reported from Cardigan, Wales. In 2007, it was found breeding for the first time in England, in Leicestershire. This follows a northwards expansion of its range in France, Germany, and the Channel Islands. In 2010 it was recorded in Northamptonshire and Worcestershire.

In India, any all-black species of Xylocopa are referred to by the common name "bhanvra" (or "bhomora" – ভোমোৰা – in Assamese), and reports and sightings of bhanvra are commonly misattributed to this species. However, this species is found only in the northern regions of Jammu and Kashmir and Punjab. Most reported sightings refer to any of several other common black Xylocopa, such as X. nasalis, X. tenuiscapa, or X. tranquebarorum.

== Description ==
Violet carpenter bees hibernate over winter and they emerge in the spring, usually around April or May. Hibernation is undertaken by the adults in wood where there are abandoned nest tunnels. In the late spring or early summer, they may be seen around searching for mates and suitable nesting sites. After mating, the gravid females bore tunnels in dead wood, which is where the name "carpenter bee" comes from, although old nest tunnels may be used.

Like other solitary bees, the female creates the nest alone. The eggs are laid within a series of small cells, each of which is supplied with a pollen ball for the larvae to feed upon. The adults emerge in late summer then hibernate until the following year.

== Gallery ==
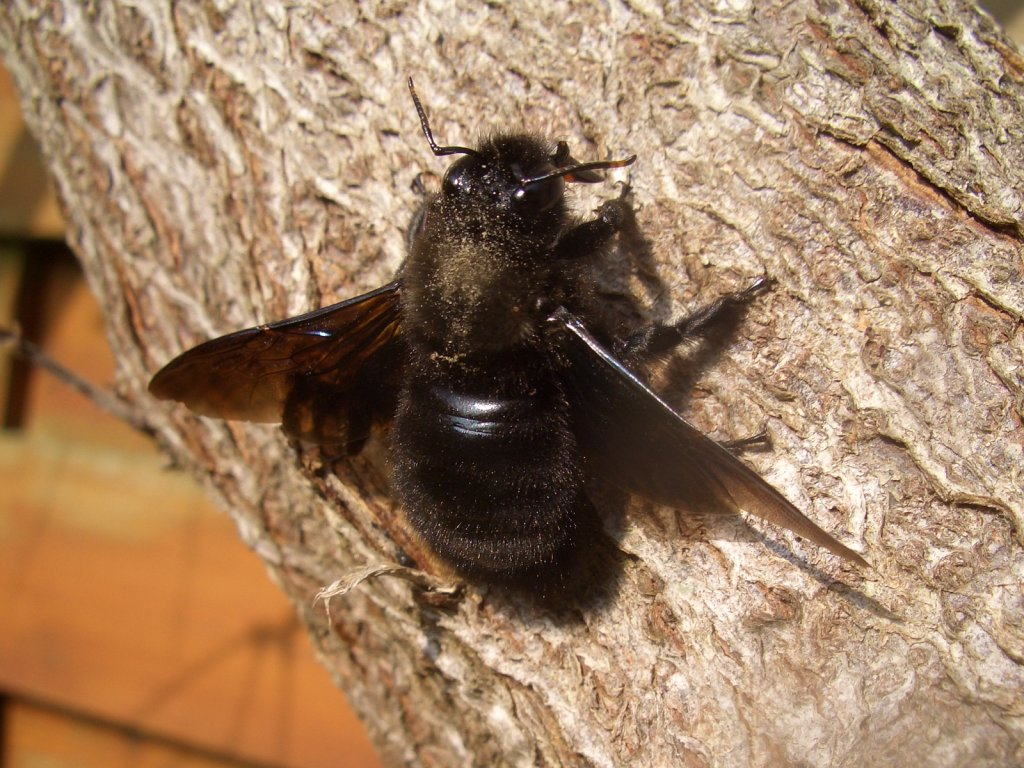
Male European carpenter bee

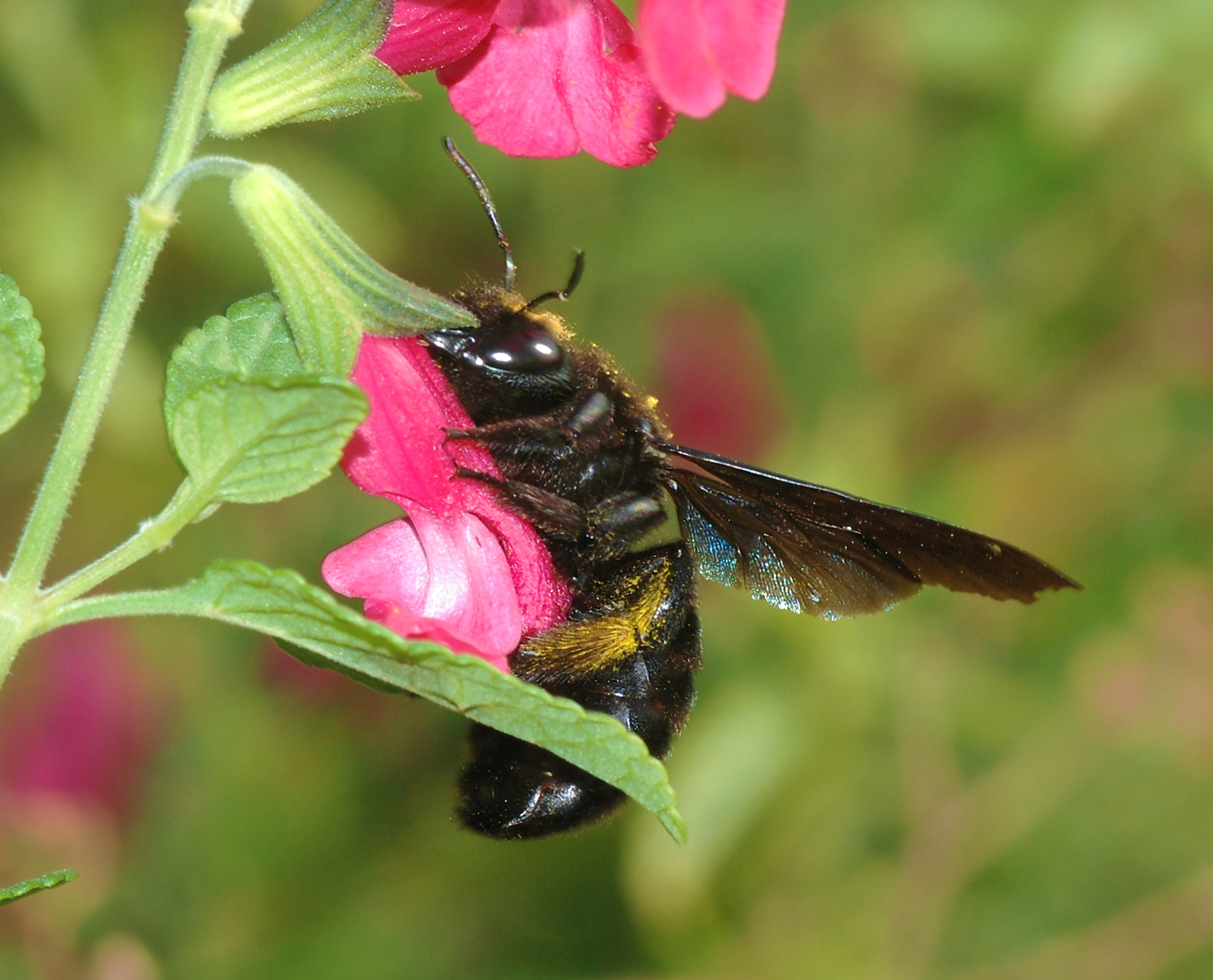
Female European carpenter bee

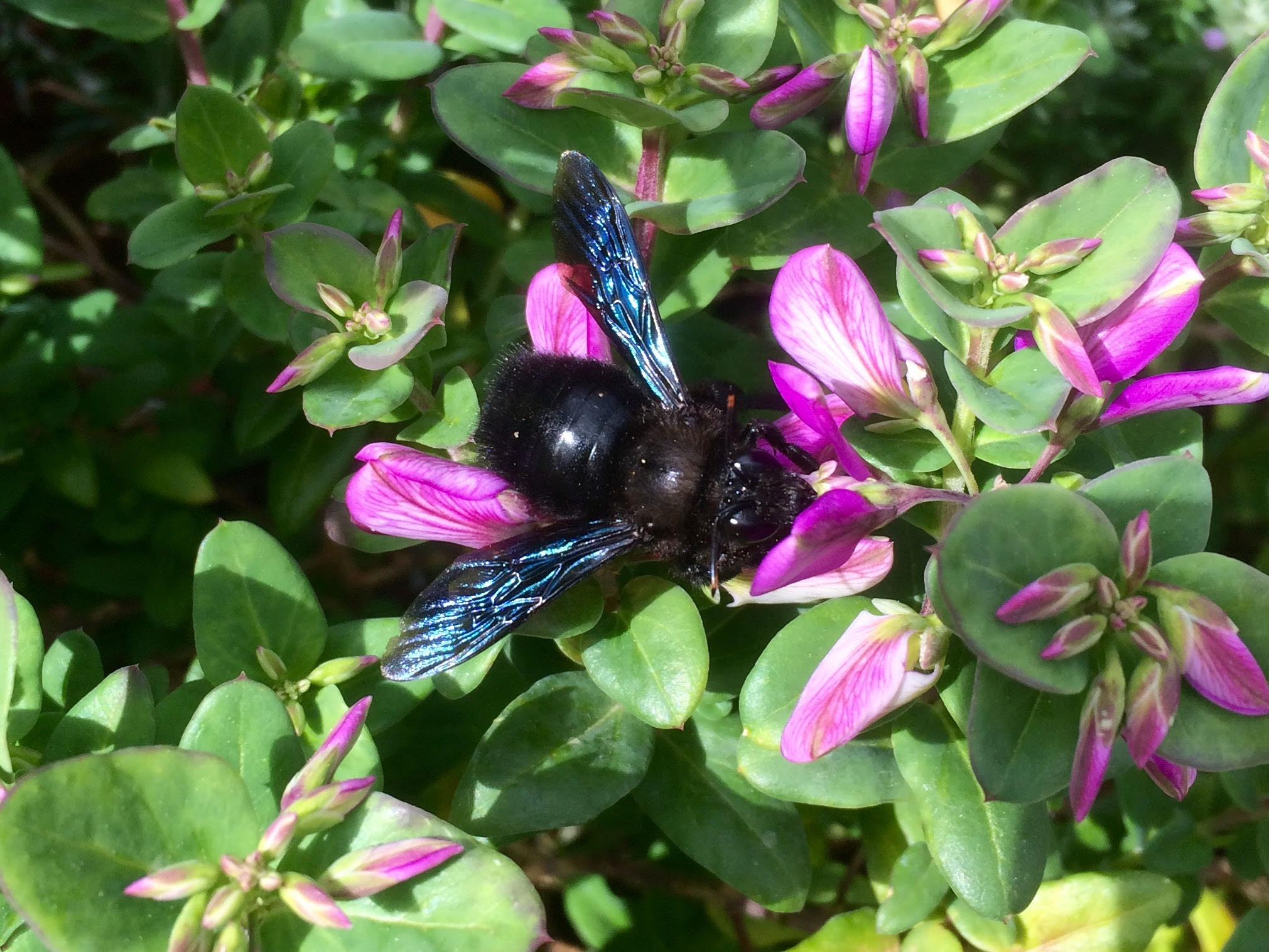
In Barcelona

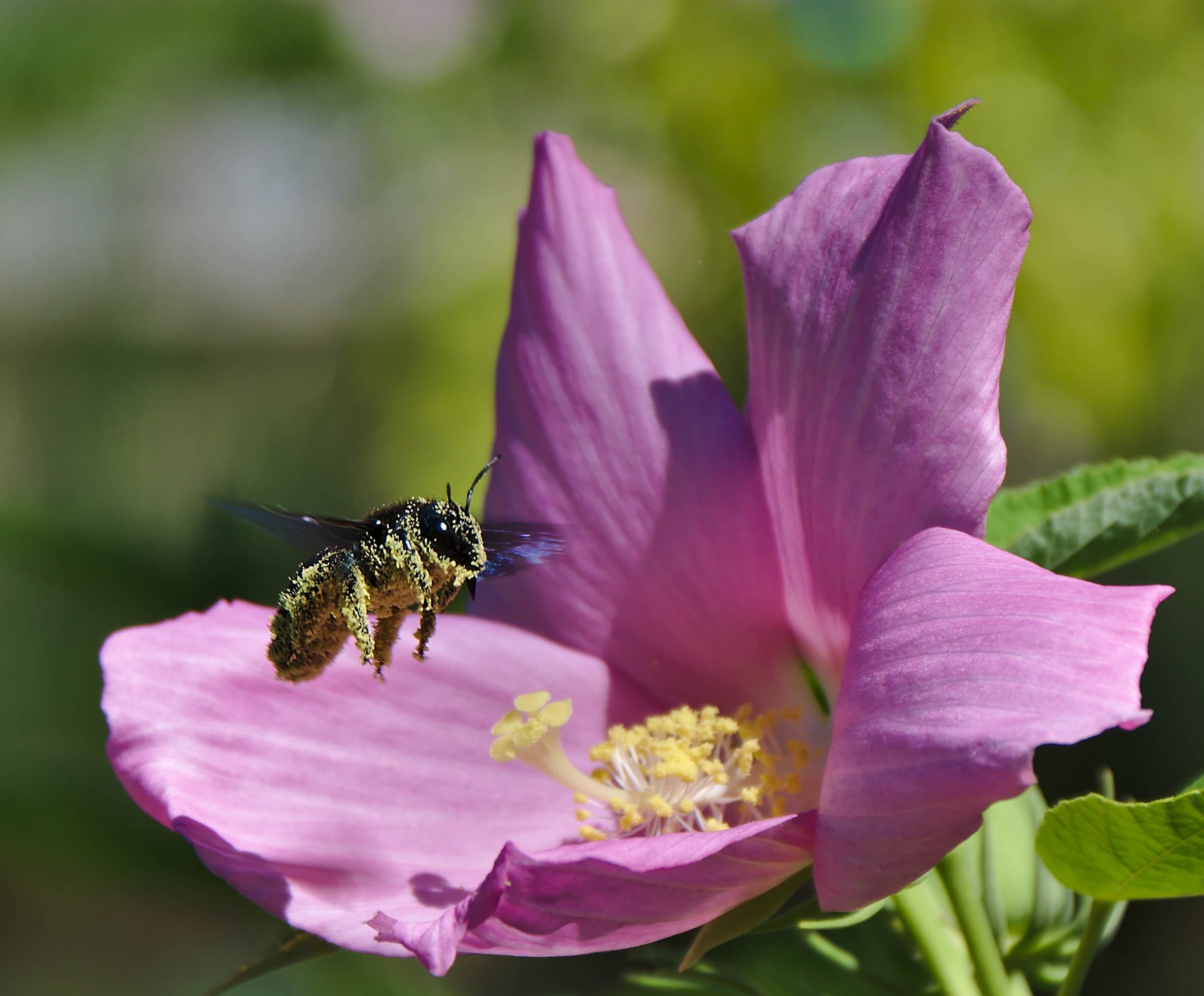
In Jardins des Martels, France

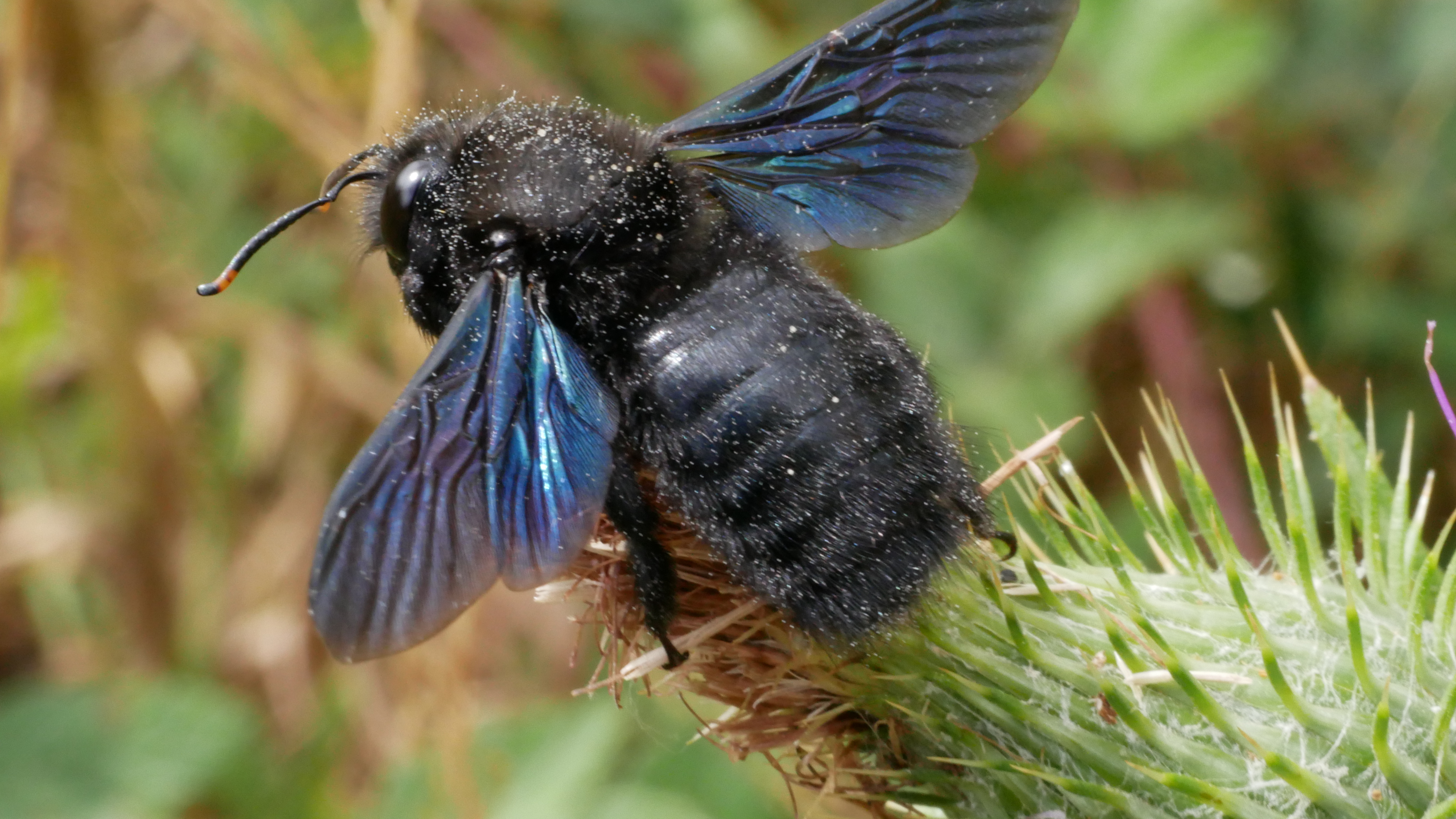
On a wild thistle in the Cévennes National Park, France

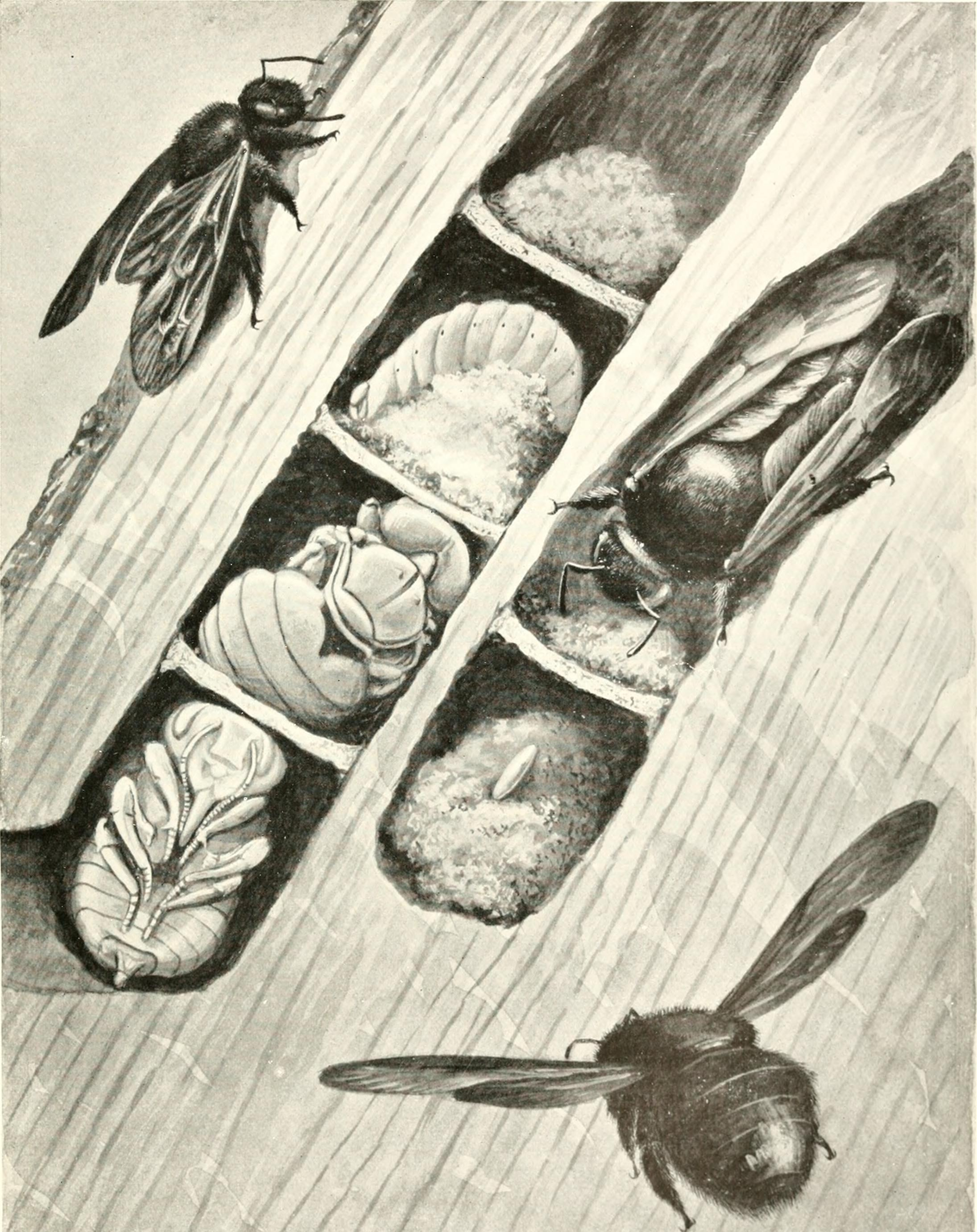
Cross-section of brood chambers

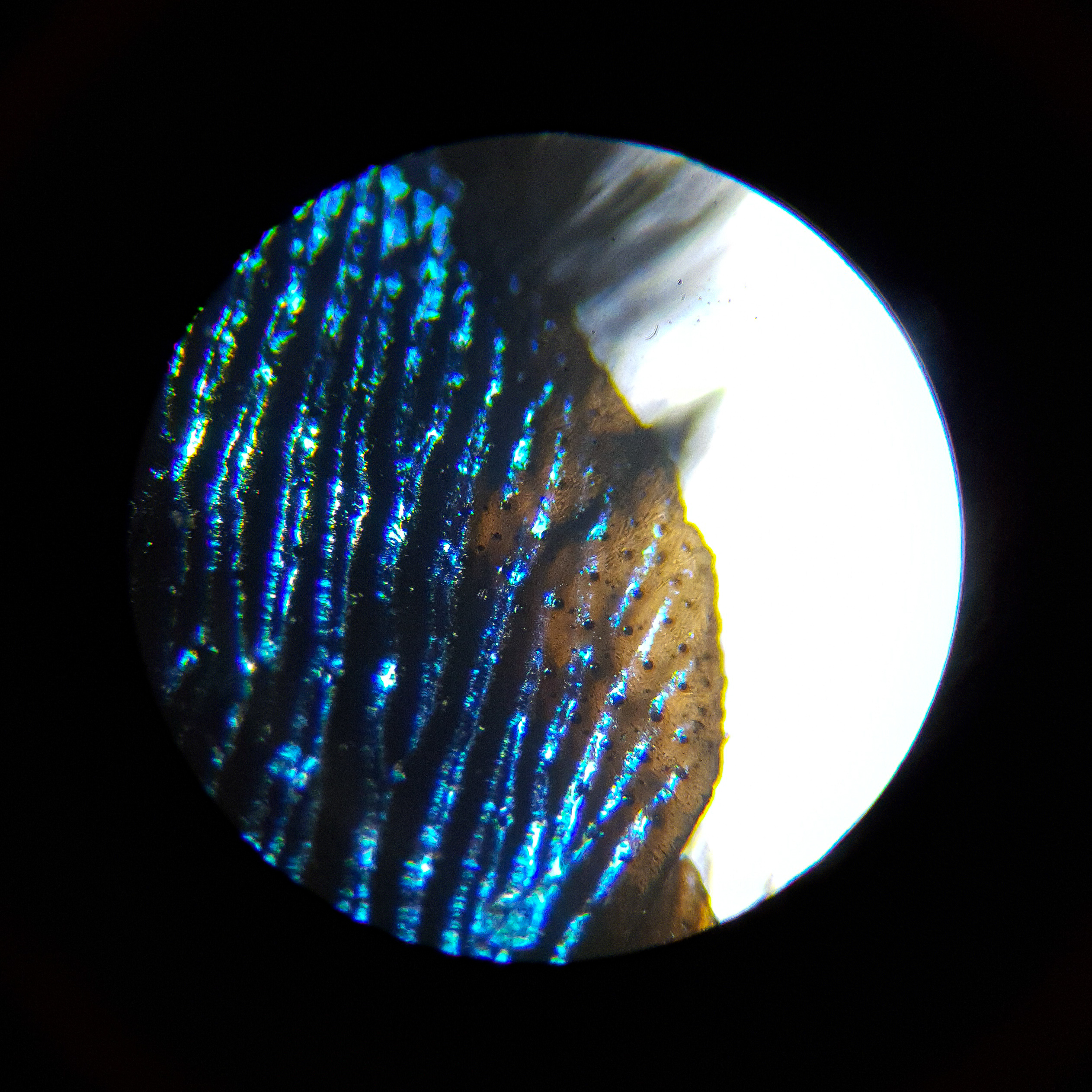
Wing of the violet carpenter bee under microscope

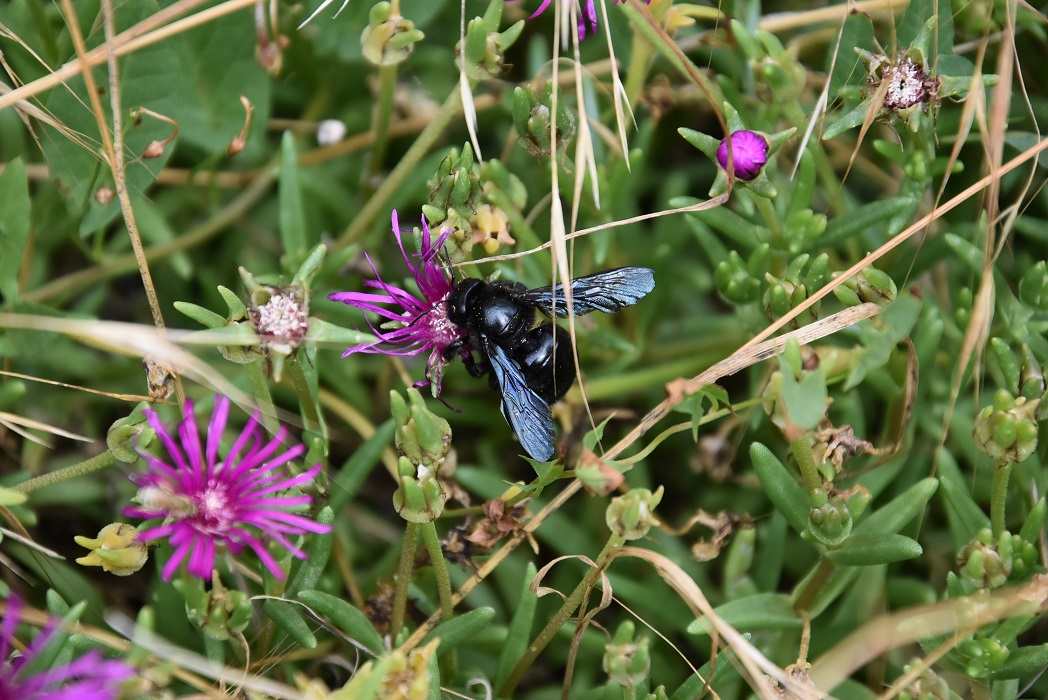
Gathering nectar from an aster, France

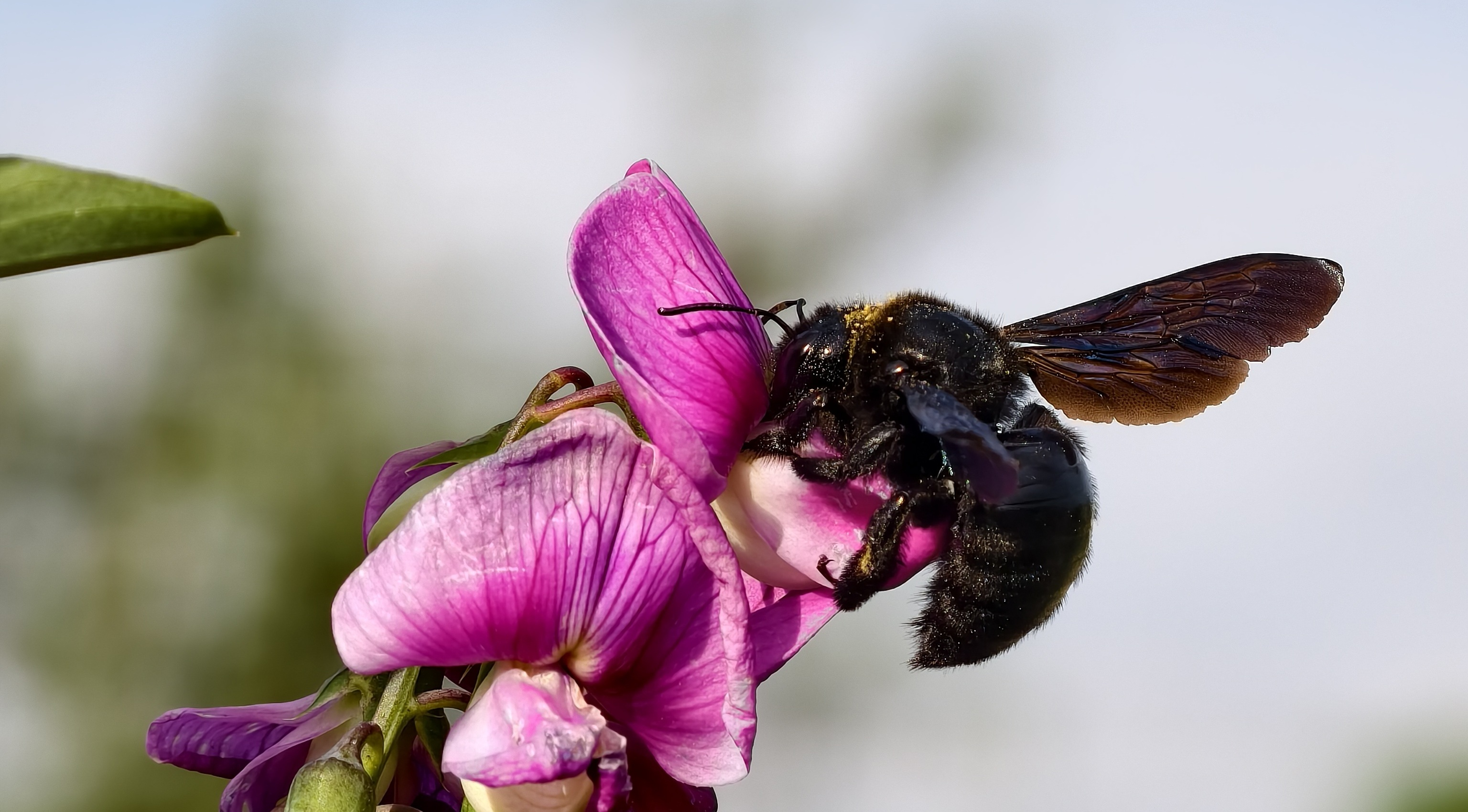
Violet carpenter bee (Xylocopa violacea). Wrocław, Poland

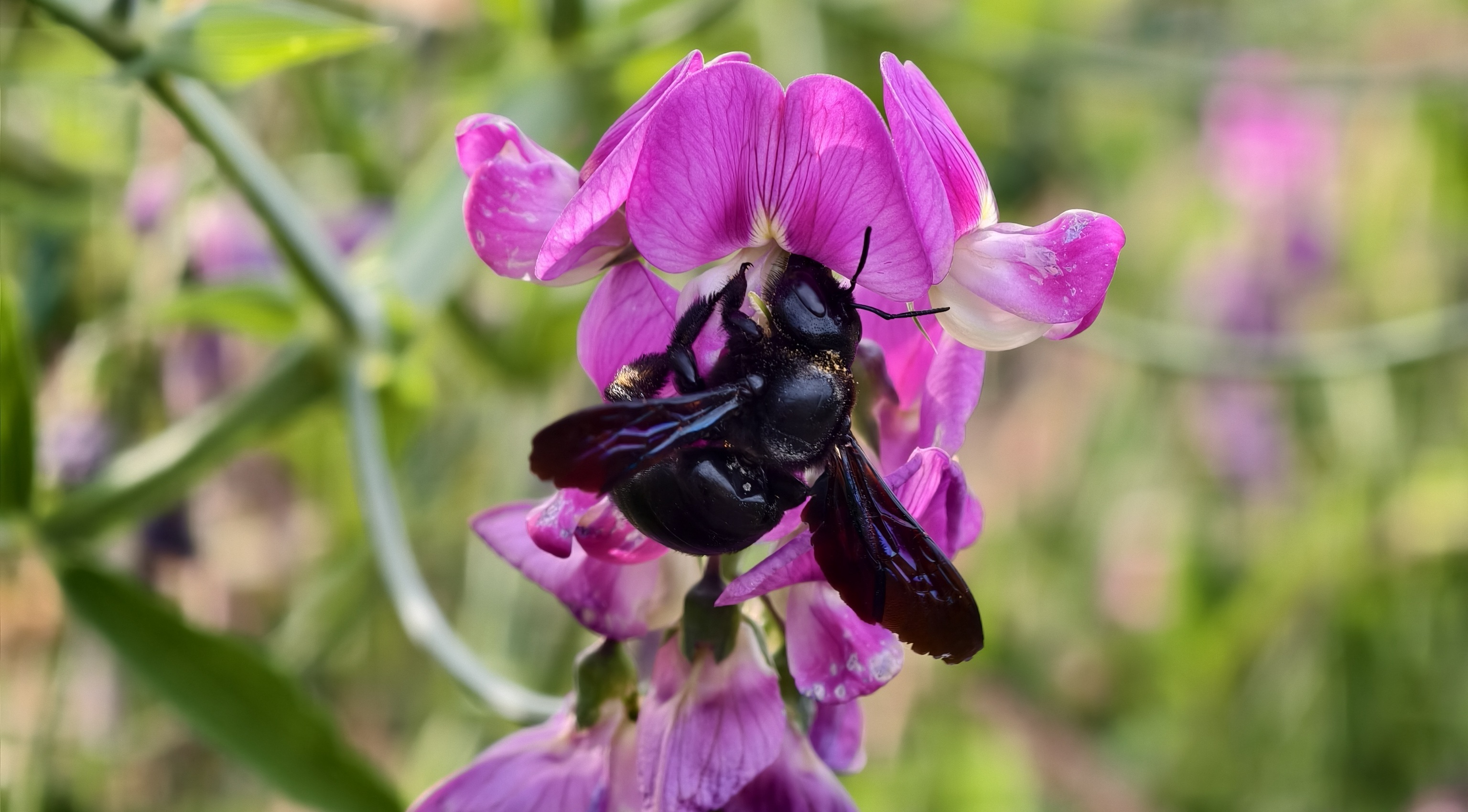
Violet carpenter bee (Xylocopa violacea) collecting pollen from a sweet pea flower. Wrocław, Poland

Violet carpenter bee (Xylocopa violacea). Wrocław, Poland
