= Lucie Bouniol =

French sculptor and painter (1896–1988)

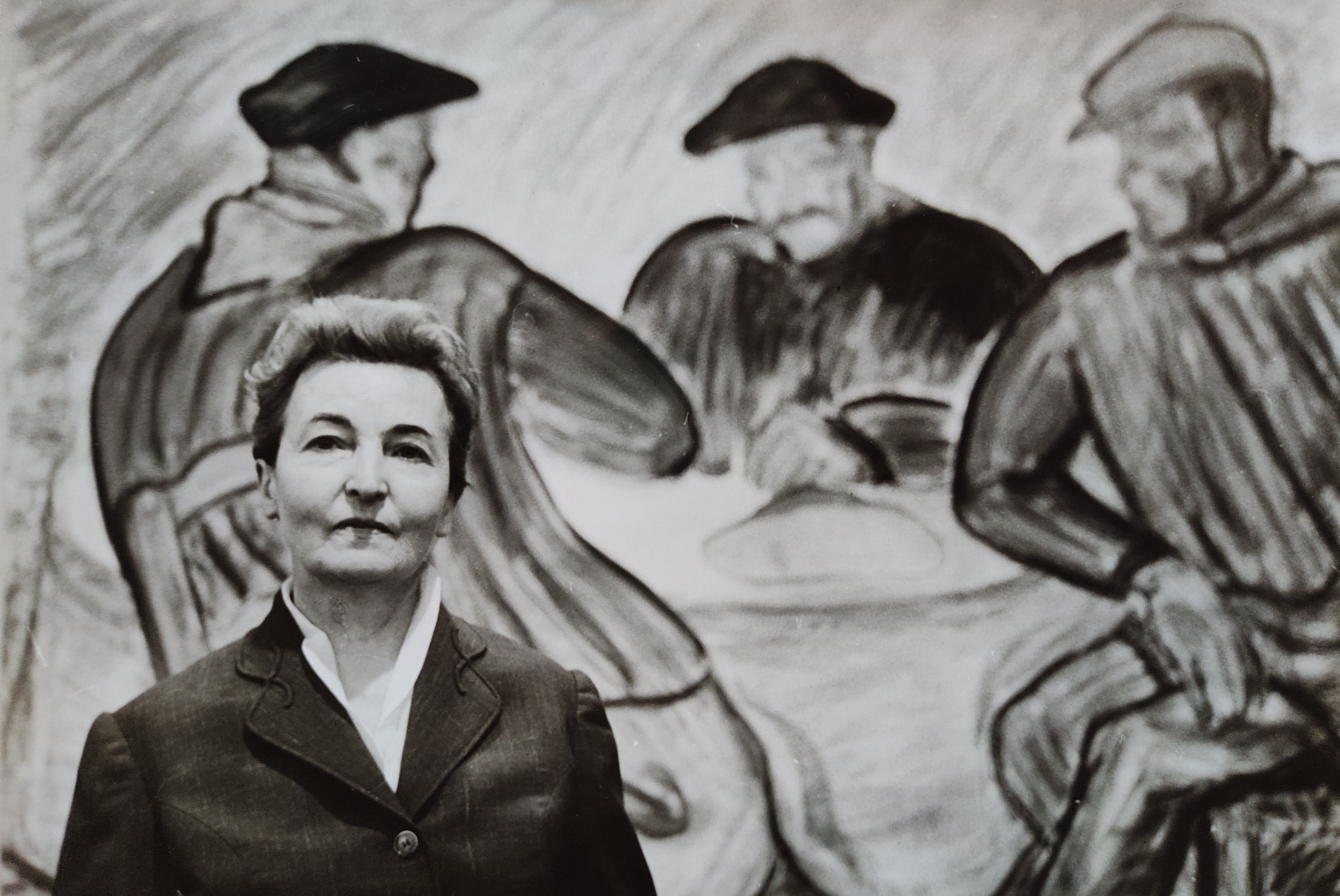
- Born: 16 December 1896; Giroussens, France
- Died: 31 January 1988 (aged 92); Giroussens, France
- Education: Ecole des Beaux-Arts, Paris
- Occupations: Sculptor and painter
- Children: 2

Lucie Bouniol (16 December 1896 – 31 January 1988) was a French sculptor and painter from the department of Tarn in southern France, who exhibited widely throughout the 20th century.

== Biography ==
Bouniol was born in the family chateau in Giroussens; her father was a physician and her mother a pianist. She studied art in Marseille and then at Ecole des Beaux-Arts in Paris. She was also known to be a student of sculptors Antoine Bourdelle and Paul Landowski at their Paris studios. During this period, she prepared a sculpture for the Rome Prize competition, but when academics suggested that she retouch it to make it more acceptable, she refused and withdrew it from consideration.

=== War monuments ===
After World War I ended, she sculpted three monuments dedicated to the war dead: one in Trémont-sur-Saulx (Meuse), a second in Robert-Espagne, also in the Meuse region, and the third at Duravel (Lot). For the Exposition Universelle in Paris in 1937, she carved a fountain. She also sculpted many busts that were commissioned by private collectors.

Her work appeared on exhibit in Paris at the Salon des Artistes Français, of which she became a member. She received an award from the Society in 1921. She also exhibited drawings and sculptures at the Salon d'Automne from 1930 to 1935. In 1932, she exhibited at the Paris salon held in 1932 by the Société des Artistes Indépendants. In addition, she participated in group exhibitions in Tarn as well as in other countries including Greece, Athens, England, Turkey, Italy, Germany and Spain.

Bouniol's work was the subject of two 1982 solo exhibits at the Musée d'Amiens in Paris and in Cordes (Tarn). In 1991, shortly after her death at Giroussens, her work was on display at two other exhibitions held in Théron-Périé, Castres and Moulins Albigeois, Albi. In 2019, she was the subject of a conference titled, "Lucie Bouniol, a Tarn woman at the Palais Royal" held in Lisle-Sur-Tarn (near Albi).

=== Awards and honors ===
- Bouniol received numerous awards, including the Chenavard prize.
- For a time, she chaired the art section of the International Women's Leisure and Sports Club and used her position to promote art by other female artists.
- Place Lucie Bouniol is a square in Giroussens named in her honor. The village has housed a permanent collection of her artwork since 2000.

=== Collette connection ===
According to Canonica, Bouniol was a long-time friend of the writer Colette. The two exchanged letters for many years and Colette "contributed to the awakening of her feminist consciousness." Canonica remarks that "throughout [Bouniol's] life and her artistic career, this great Lady has been interested in the emancipation of women and made her contribution to it in her own way."

== Published book ==
- Colette, and Lucie Bouniol. Les Petits Mots De Colette, Les Dessins De Lucie: [exposition, Giroussens, Maison De La Céramique Contemporaine, 26 Juin-31 Octobre 2004]. Giroussens (Place Lucie-Bouniol, 81500: Maison de la céramique contemporaine, 2004. Print.
