= Giroussens =

- Commune
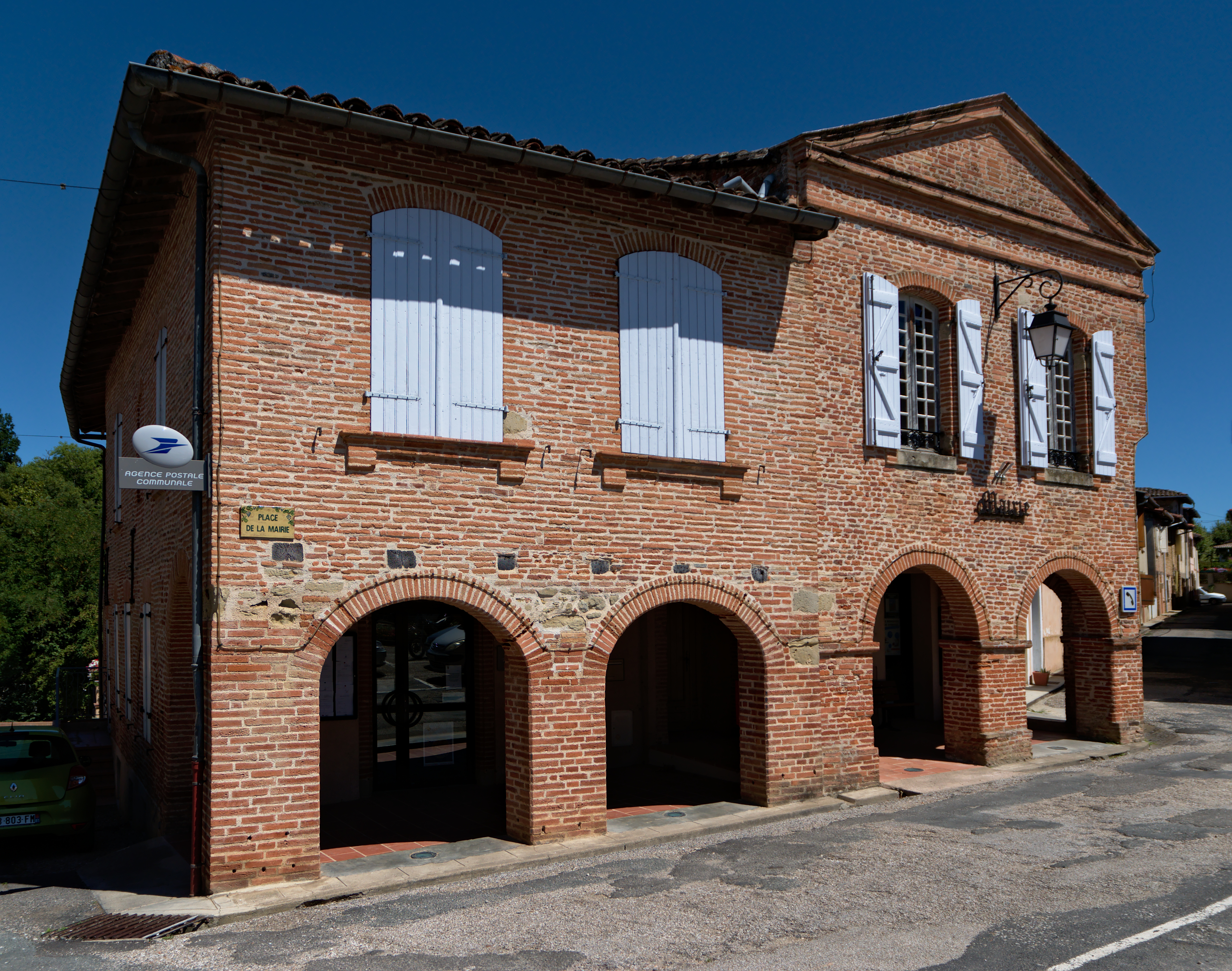
- The town hall in Giroussens.

- Coat of arms
- Location of Giroussens
- Location within France Location within Occitanie
- Coordinates: 43°45′47″N 1°46′37″E
- Country: France
- Region: Occitania
- Department: Tarn
- Arrondissement: Castres
- Canton: Les Portes du Tarn
- Intercommunality: CA Gaillac-Graulhet

Government
  - Mayor (2020–2026): Gilles Turlan
- Area^{1}: 41.67 km^{2} (16.09 sq mi)
- Elevation: 175 m (574 ft)
- Highest elevation: 272 m (892 ft)
- Lowest elevation: 95 m (312 ft)
- Population (2023): 1,571
  - Density: 37.70/km^{2} (97.65/sq mi)
- Time zone: UTC+01:00 (CET)
  - Summer (DST): UTC+02:00 (CEST)
- INSEE/Postal code: 81104 /81500
- ^{1} French Land Register data, which excludes lakes, ponds, glaciers > 1 km^{2} (0.386 sq mi or 247 acres) and river estuaries.

Giroussens is a commune in the department of Tarn in southern France. It is particularly famous for its market of European pottery that attracts many tourists in the spring.

== Geography ==
The commune is traversed by the river Dadou.

== Notable personalities ==
- Lucie Bouniol (1896-1988), sculptor, painter, born at the castle of Belbèze.

== Points of interest ==
- Jardins des Martels

== See also ==
- Communes of the Tarn department
