= Jardins des Martels =

Commercial botanical garden and flower park in Giroussens, Tarn, Occitanie, France

Coordinates: 43.7496°N 1.78634°E

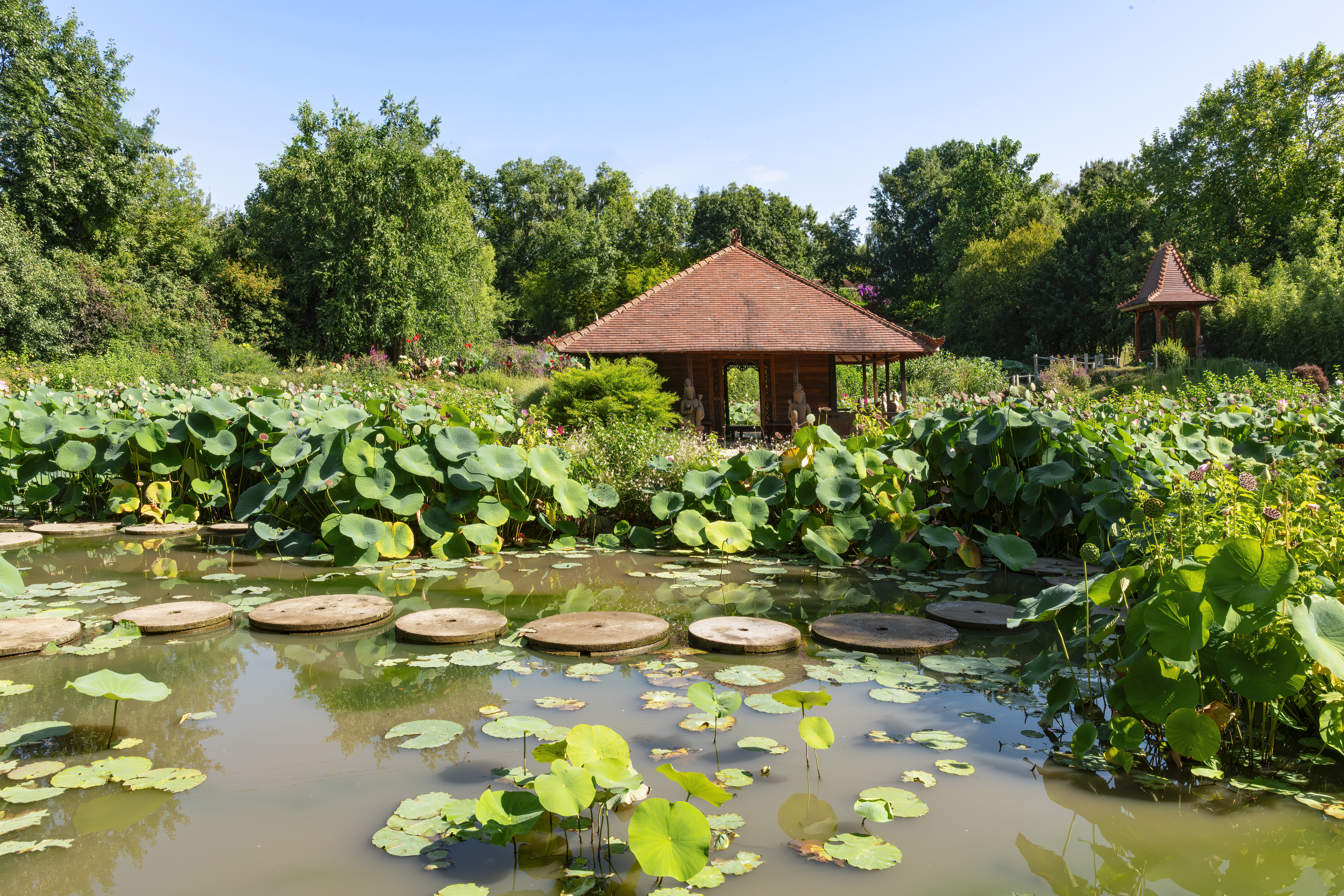
- Location: Giroussens, Tarn, Midi-Pyrénées, France
- Area: 3.5 hectares (8.6 acres)

The Jardins des Martels is a 3.5-hectare (8.6-acre) commercial botanical garden and flower park located in Giroussens, Tarn, Occitanie, France. It is open daily in the warmer months; an admission fee is charged.

The gardens were created by Marie-Thérèse and André Reynier in the late 1960s, as a private garden on their farm, and after considerable development opened to the public in 1994. Today the garden is set upon a well-landscaped terrain of numerous pools and hills, and features more than 2500 plant varieties from five continents, as well as a greenhouse of aquatic plants and a mini-farm with about 150 animals such as sheep, goats, ponies, ducks, and so forth.

== See also ==
- List of botanical gardens in France
