= Grazac =

Grazac may refer to:

- Grazac, Haute-Garonne, in the Haute-Garonne department
- Grazac, Haute-Loire, in the Haute-Loire department
- Grazac, Tarn, in the Tarn department
