= Saint-Urcisse =

Saint-Urcisse may refer to the following places in France:

- Saint-Urcisse, Lot-et-Garonne, a commune in the Lot-et-Garonne department
- Saint-Urcisse, Tarn, a commune in the Tarn department
