= Maurice de Guérin =

French poet

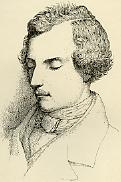
- Born: Georges-Maurice de Guérin; 4 August 1810; Andillac, Tarn, France
- Died: 19 July 1839 (aged 28); Andillac, Tarn, France
- Education: Collège Stanislas de Paris
- Occupation: Poet

Georges-Maurice de Guérin (4 August 1810 – 19 July 1839) was a French poet. His works were imbued with a passion for nature whose intensity reached almost to worship and was enriched by pagan elements. According to Sainte-Beuve, no French poet or painter rendered "the feeling for nature, the feeling for the origin of things and the sovereign principle of life" as well as Guérin.

== Biography ==
Descended from nobility, Maurice de Guérin was born at the château of Le Cayla in Andillac, Tarn. He was raised in a strict Roman Catholic family and educated at a religious seminary in Toulouse before attending the Collège Stanislas de Paris, where he met lifelong friend Jules Barbey d'Aurevilly.

After graduating from Collége Stanislas in 1831, Guérin decided against a traditional religious life and instead went to Brittany to enter a radical Christian socialist society founded by Hugues Felicité Robert de Lamennais. However, Lamennais came into conflict with the Holy See in 1833 and the society was disbanded, with Lamennais and Guérin severing their ties altogether with Christianity. Guérin then moved to Paris, where he composed his two major works, La Bacchante and Le Centaure, but became sick in 1837. He partially recovered from his illness in 1838 and in November of that year agreed to an arranged marriage with Caroline de Gervain, a noble lady of some fortune. However, he soon fell ill again and died of consumption in July 1839 at the young age of 28. None of his works had been published. He destroyed many of his poems before his death.

== Dissemination ==
Guérin's remaining works were spread between family and acquaintances all over France. His journal went with one of his friends to Louisiana and Alabama and came back to Caen, where it survived the bombings of 1944.

In 1840, a memorial of Maurice de Guérin was published in the Revue des deux Mondes by George Sand, to which she added two fragments of his writings—one a composition in prose, and the other a short poem. Reliquiae, a work which included Guérin's Le Centaure in addition to his journal and a number of his letters and several poems, was edited by G. S. Trébutien, accompanied with a biographical and critical notice by Charles Augustin Sainte-Beuve and published in 1861. A new edition, titled Journal, lettres et poèmes, followed in 1862, and an English translation of the latter was published by Leypoldt and Holt in 1867. Guérin's sister, Eugénie, also published some of his works after his death.
