= Labastide-de-Lévis =

- Commune
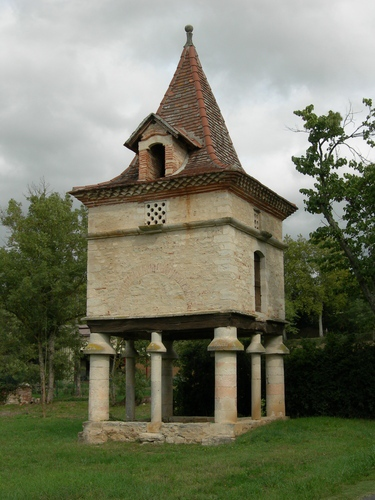
- The dovecote in Labastide-de-Lévis

- Coat of arms
- Location of Labastide-de-Lévis
- Location within France Location within Occitanie
- Coordinates: 43°55′39″N 2°00′42″E
- Country: France
- Region: Occitania
- Department: Tarn
- Arrondissement: Albi
- Canton: Les Deux Rives
- Intercommunality: CA Gaillac-Graulhet
- Area^{1}: 14.29 km^{2} (5.52 sq mi)
- Elevation: 151 m (495 ft)
- Highest elevation: 220 m (720 ft)
- Lowest elevation: 135 m (443 ft)
- Population (2023): 971
  - Density: 67.9/km^{2} (176/sq mi)
- Time zone: UTC+01:00 (CET)
  - Summer (DST): UTC+02:00 (CEST)
- INSEE/Postal code: 81112 /81150
- ^{1} French Land Register data, which excludes lakes, ponds, glaciers > 1 km^{2} (0.386 sq mi or 247 acres) and river estuaries.

Labastide-de-Lévis is a commune in the Tarn department in southern France.

== See also ==
- Communes of the Tarn department
