= Rivières, Tarn =

Rivières
- Commune
- Coat of arms
- Location of Rivières
- Location within France Location within Occitanie
- Coordinates: 43°54′54″N 1°57′48″E
- Country: France
- Region: Occitania
- Department: Tarn
- Arrondissement: Albi
- Canton: Les Deux Rives
- Intercommunality: CA Gaillac-Graulhet

Government
  - Mayor (2020–2026): Christophe Herin
- Area^{1}: 9.57 km^{2} (3.69 sq mi)
- Elevation: 140 m (460 ft)
- Highest elevation: 158 m (518 ft)
- Lowest elevation: 115 m (377 ft)
- Population (2023): 1,061
  - Density: 111/km^{2} (287/sq mi)
- Time zone: UTC+01:00 (CET)
  - Summer (DST): UTC+02:00 (CEST)
- INSEE/Postal code: 81225 /81600
- ^{1} French Land Register data, which excludes lakes, ponds, glaciers > 1 km^{2} (0.386 sq mi or 247 acres) and river estuaries.

Rivières (French pronunciation: [ʁivjɛʁ]; Occitan: Ribièiras) is a commune in the Tarn department in southern France.

== See also ==
- Communes of the Tarn department
