= Canton of Graulhet =

Coordinates: 43.76°N 1.99°E

The canton of Graulhet is an administrative division of the Tarn department, southern France. Its borders were not modified at the French canton reorganisation which came into effect in March 2015. Its seat is in Graulhet.

It consists of the following communes:

1. Briatexte
2. Busque
3. Graulhet
4. Missècle
5. Moulayrès
6. Puybegon
7. Saint-Gauzens
