= Beauvais-sur-Tescou =

- Commune
- Coat of arms
- Location of Beauvais-sur-Tescou
- Location within France Location within Occitanie
- Coordinates: 43°54′39″N 1°34′14″E
- Country: France
- Region: Occitania
- Department: Tarn
- Arrondissement: Albi
- Canton: Vignobles et Bastides
- Intercommunality: CA Gaillac-Graulhet

Government
  - Mayor (2020–2026): Bernard Eguiluz
- Area^{1}: 12.1 km^{2} (4.7 sq mi)
- Elevation: 140 m (460 ft)
- Highest elevation: 230 m (750 ft)
- Lowest elevation: 128 m (420 ft)
- Population (2023): 379
  - Density: 31.3/km^{2} (81.1/sq mi)
- Time zone: UTC+01:00 (CET)
  - Summer (DST): UTC+02:00 (CEST)
- INSEE/Postal code: 81024 /81630
- ^{1} French Land Register data, which excludes lakes, ponds, glaciers > 1 km^{2} (0.386 sq mi or 247 acres) and river estuaries.

Beauvais-sur-Tescou (French pronunciation: [bovɛ syʁ tɛsku], literally Beauvais on Tescou; Occitan: Biuvais de Tescon) is a commune in the Tarn department of southern France.

== See also ==
- Communes of the Tarn department
