= Roquemaure, Tarn =

Roquemaure
- Commune
- Coat of arms
- Location of Roquemaure
- Location within France Location within Occitanie
- Coordinates: 43°48′51″N 1°37′28″E
- Country: France
- Region: Occitania
- Department: Tarn
- Arrondissement: Albi
- Canton: Vignobles et Bastides
- Intercommunality: CA Gaillac-Graulhet

Government
  - Mayor (2020–2026): Claude Soulies
- Area^{1}: 15.77 km^{2} (6.09 sq mi)
- Elevation: 215 m (705 ft)
- Highest elevation: 231 m (758 ft)
- Lowest elevation: 108 m (354 ft)
- Population (2023): 465
  - Density: 29.5/km^{2} (76.4/sq mi)
- Time zone: UTC+01:00 (CET)
  - Summer (DST): UTC+02:00 (CEST)
- INSEE/Postal code: 81228 /81800
- ^{1} French Land Register data, which excludes lakes, ponds, glaciers > 1 km^{2} (0.386 sq mi or 247 acres) and river estuaries.

Roquemaure (French pronunciation: [ʁɔkmɔʁ]; Occitan: Ròcamaura, meaning brown rock) is a commune in the Tarn department in southern France.

== See also ==
- Communes of the Tarn department
