= Florentin, Tarn =

Florentin
- Commune
- Coat of arms
- Location of Florentin
- Location within France Location within Occitanie
- Coordinates: 43°53′19″N 2°02′03″E
- Country: France
- Region: Occitania
- Department: Tarn
- Arrondissement: Albi
- Canton: Les Deux Rives
- Intercommunality: CA Gaillac-Graulhet

Government
  - Mayor (2020–2026): Jean-Marc Duboë
- Area^{1}: 12.62 km^{2} (4.87 sq mi)
- Elevation: 200 m (660 ft)
- Highest elevation: 250 m (820 ft)
- Lowest elevation: 153 m (502 ft)
- Population (2023): 762
  - Density: 60.4/km^{2} (156/sq mi)
- Time zone: UTC+01:00 (CET)
  - Summer (DST): UTC+02:00 (CEST)
- INSEE/Postal code: 81093 /81150
- ^{1} French Land Register data, which excludes lakes, ponds, glaciers > 1 km^{2} (0.386 sq mi or 247 acres) and river estuaries.

Florentin is a commune in the Tarn department in southern France.

== See also ==
- Communes of the Tarn department
