= Labessière-Candeil =

- Commune
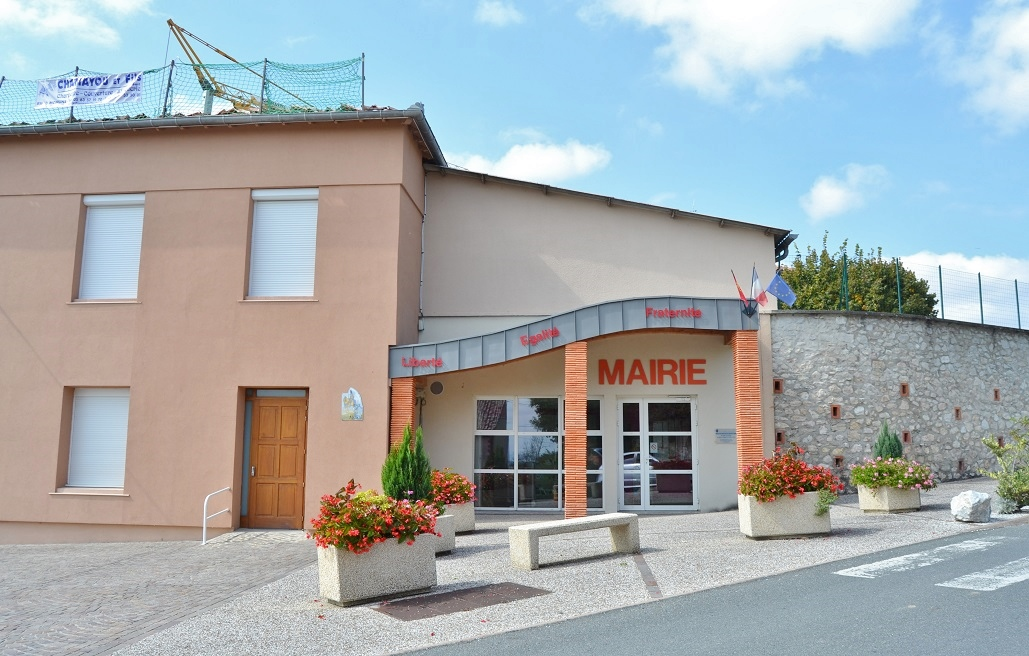
- Labessière-Candeil Town hall

- Coat of arms
- Location of Labessière-Candeil
- Location within France Location within Occitanie
- Coordinates: 43°48′08″N 2°00′21″E
- Country: France
- Region: Occitania
- Department: Tarn
- Arrondissement: Albi
- Canton: Les Deux Rives
- Intercommunality: CA Gaillac-Graulhet

Government
  - Mayor (2020–2026): Francis Monsarrat
- Area^{1}: 21.98 km^{2} (8.49 sq mi)
- Elevation: 265 m (869 ft)
- Highest elevation: 290 m (950 ft)
- Lowest elevation: 167 m (548 ft)
- Population (2023): 710
  - Density: 32/km^{2} (84/sq mi)
- Time zone: UTC+01:00 (CET)
  - Summer (DST): UTC+02:00 (CEST)
- INSEE/Postal code: 81117 /81300
- ^{1} French Land Register data, which excludes lakes, ponds, glaciers > 1 km^{2} (0.386 sq mi or 247 acres) and river estuaries.

Labessière-Candeil (French pronunciation: [labesjɛʁ kɑ̃dɛj]; Occitan: La Becièira de Candelh) is a commune in the Tarn department in southern France.

== See also ==
- Communes of the Tarn department
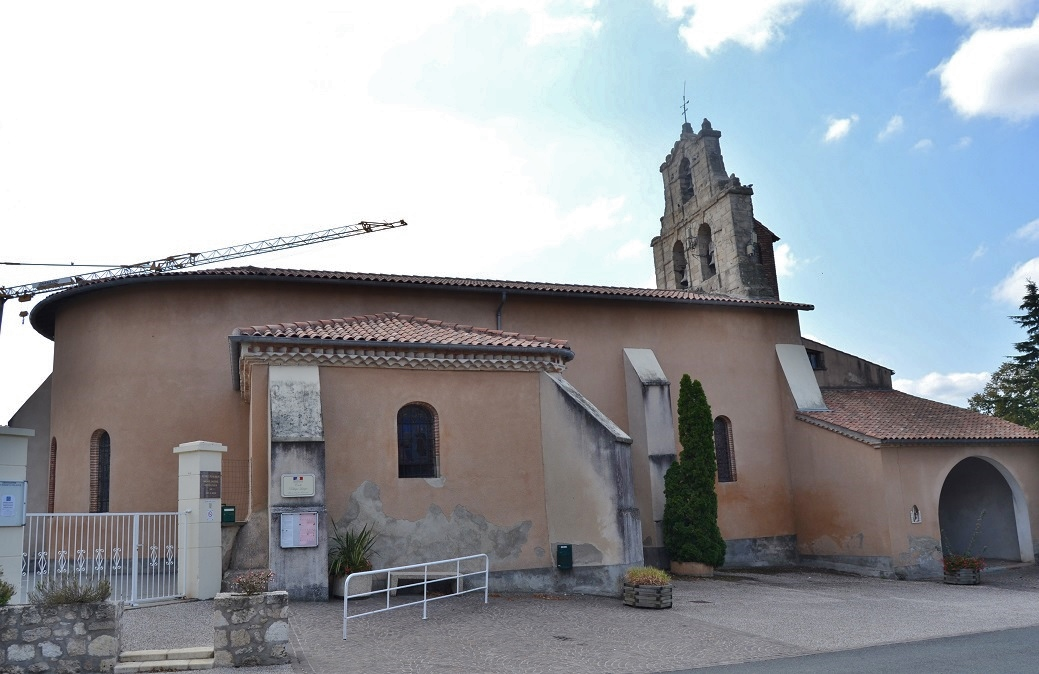
Church Sainte-Anne.

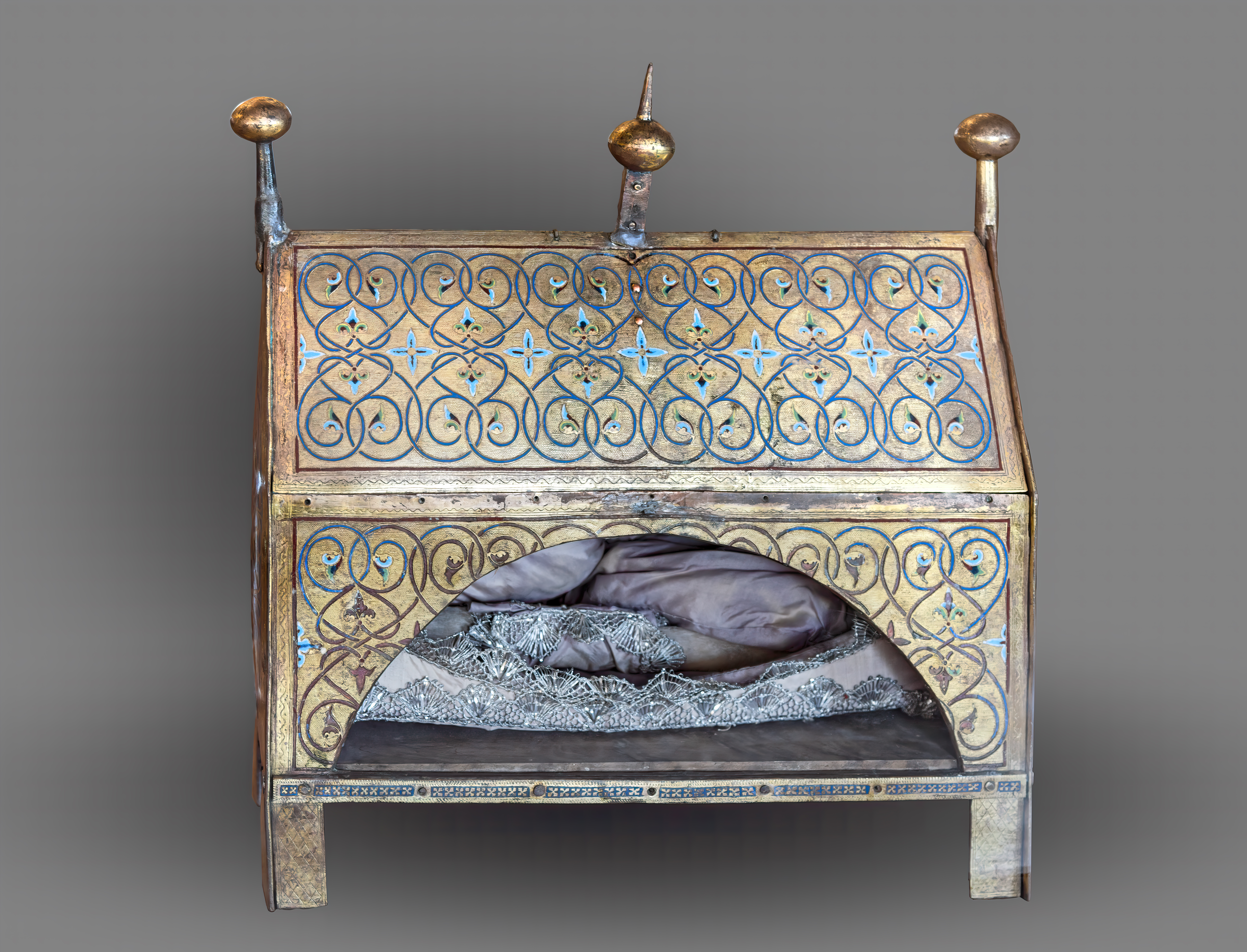
Shrine as of Labessière-Candeil

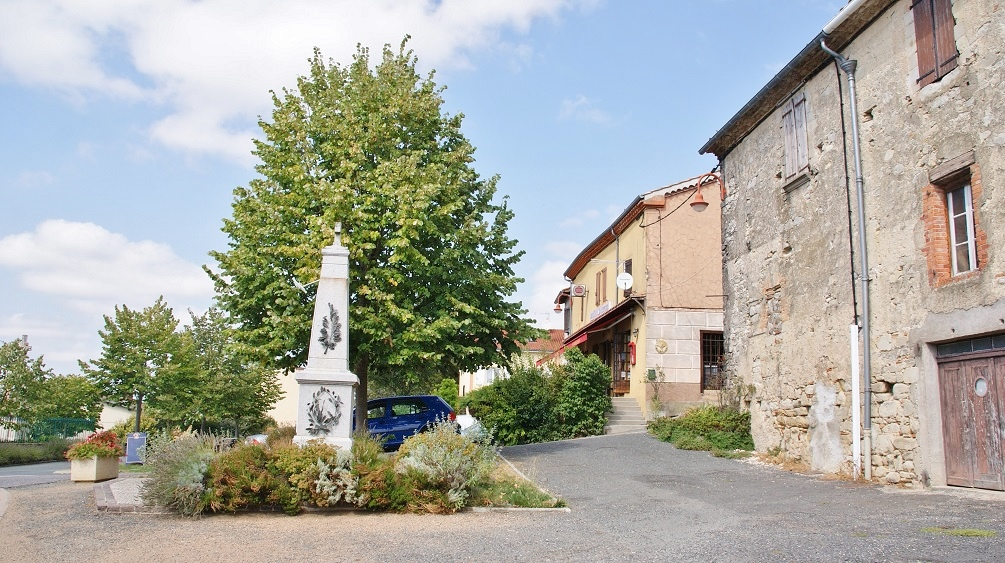
War memorial
