= Canton of Vignobles et Bastides =

Coordinates: 43.82°N 1.72°E

The canton of Vignobles et Bastides is an administrative division within the southern French department of Tarn. It was created during a cantonal reorganisation that came into effect in March 2015. Its seat is in Rabastens.

It consists of the following communes:

1. Alos
2. Andillac
3. Beauvais-sur-Tescou
4. Cahuzac-sur-Vère
5. Campagnac
6. Castelnau-de-Montmiral
7. Grazac
8. Larroque
9. Lisle-sur-Tarn
10. Mézens
11. Montdurausse
12. Montels
13. Montgaillard
14. Montvalen
15. Puycelsi
16. Rabastens
17. Roquemaure
18. Saint-Beauzile
19. Sainte-Cécile-du-Cayrou
20. Saint-Urcisse
21. Salvagnac
22. La Sauzière-Saint-Jean
23. Tauriac
24. Le Verdier
25. Vieux
