= La Sauzière-Saint-Jean =

- Commune
- Coat of arms
- Location of La Sauzière-Saint-Jean
- Location within France Location within Occitanie
- Coordinates: 43°58′15″N 1°37′47″E
- Country: France
- Region: Occitania
- Department: Tarn
- Arrondissement: Albi
- Canton: Vignobles et Bastides
- Intercommunality: CA Gaillac-Graulhet

Government
  - Mayor (2020–2026): Francis Pradier
- Area^{1}: 15.82 km^{2} (6.11 sq mi)
- Elevation: 225 m (738 ft)
- Highest elevation: 245 m (804 ft)
- Lowest elevation: 138 m (453 ft)
- Population (2023): 254
  - Density: 16.1/km^{2} (41.6/sq mi)
- Time zone: UTC+01:00 (CET)
  - Summer (DST): UTC+02:00 (CEST)
- INSEE/Postal code: 81279 /81630
- ^{1} French Land Register data, which excludes lakes, ponds, glaciers > 1 km^{2} (0.386 sq mi or 247 acres) and river estuaries.

La Sauzière-Saint-Jean (French pronunciation: [la sozjɛʁ sɛ̃ ʒɑ̃]; Languedocien: La Sausièra e Sant Joan) is a commune in the Tarn department in southern France.

== See also ==
- Communes of the Tarn department
