= Cestayrols =

- Commune
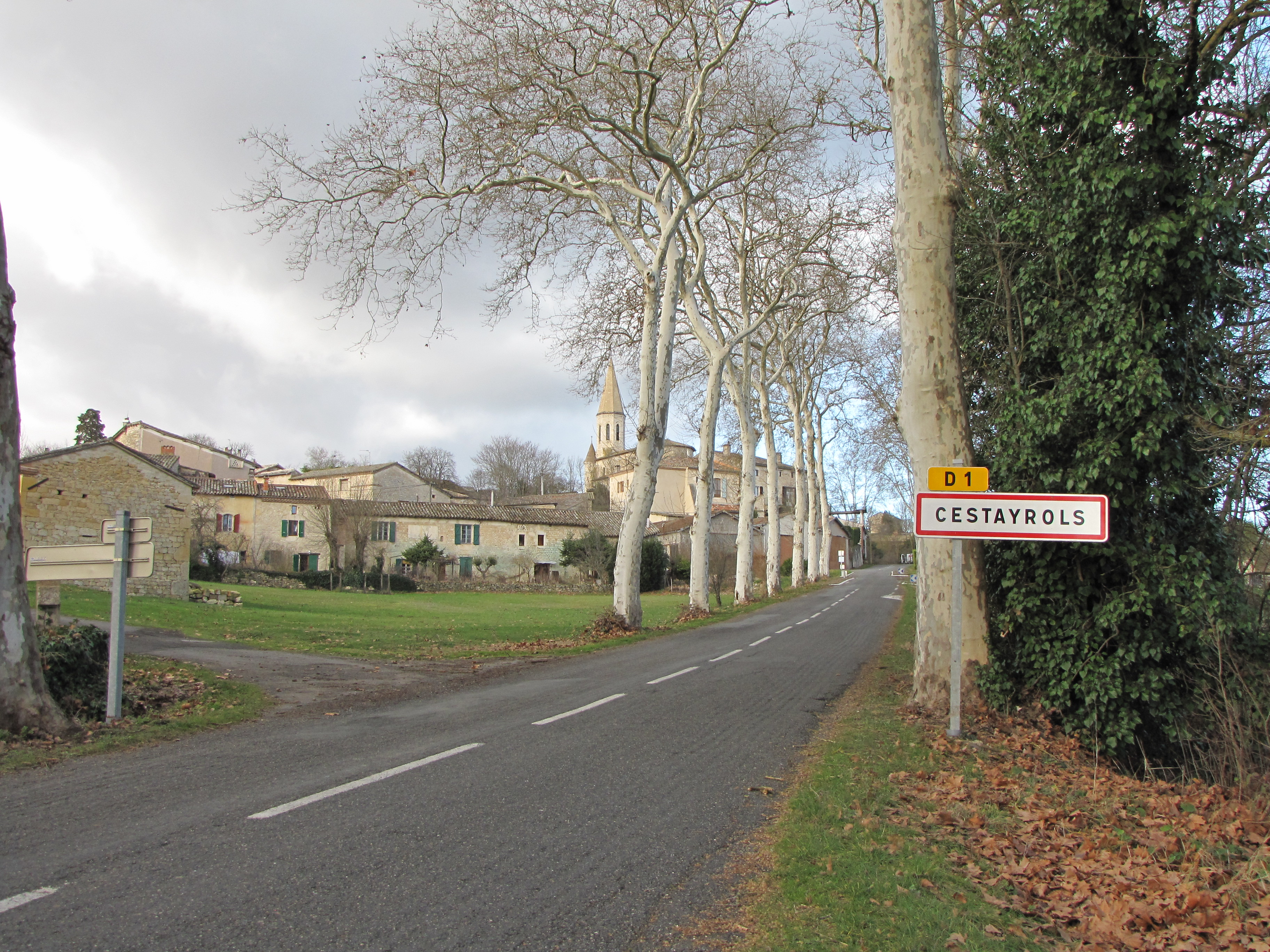
- The road into Cestayrols

- Coat of arms
- Location of Cestayrols
- Location within France Location within Occitanie
- Coordinates: 43°58′52″N 1°59′07″E
- Country: France
- Region: Occitania
- Department: Tarn
- Arrondissement: Albi
- Canton: Les Deux Rives
- Intercommunality: CA Gaillac-Graulhet
- Area^{1}: 17.03 km^{2} (6.58 sq mi)
- Elevation: 240 m (790 ft)
- Highest elevation: 282 m (925 ft)
- Lowest elevation: 188 m (617 ft)
- Population (2023): 455
  - Density: 26.7/km^{2} (69.2/sq mi)
- Time zone: UTC+01:00 (CET)
  - Summer (DST): UTC+02:00 (CEST)
- INSEE/Postal code: 81067 /81150
- ^{1} French Land Register data, which excludes lakes, ponds, glaciers > 1 km^{2} (0.386 sq mi or 247 acres) and river estuaries.

Cestayrols is a commune in the Tarn department in southern France.

== Geography ==
The Vère flows southwestward through the northern part of the commune.

== See also ==
- Communes of the Tarn department
