= Missècle =

- Commune
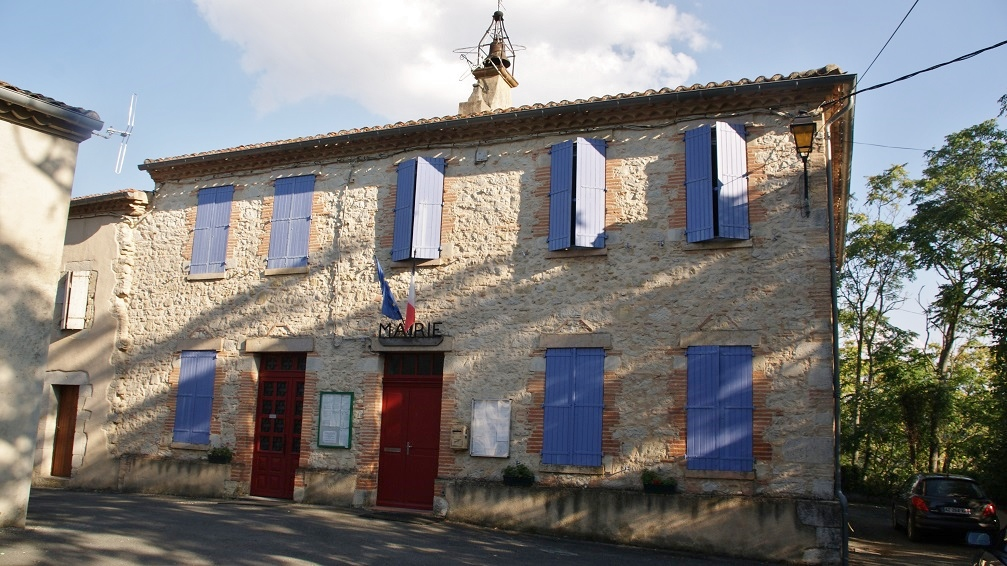
- Town hall

- Coat of arms
- Location of Missècle
- Location within France Location within Occitanie
- Coordinates: 43°43′04″N 1°59′34″E
- Country: France
- Region: Occitania
- Department: Tarn
- Arrondissement: Castres
- Canton: Graulhet

Government
  - Mayor (2020–2026): Laurent Ricard
- Area^{1}: 5.77 km^{2} (2.23 sq mi)
- Elevation: 315 m (1,033 ft)
- Highest elevation: 371 m (1,217 ft)
- Lowest elevation: 215 m (705 ft)
- Population (2023): 93
  - Density: 16/km^{2} (42/sq mi)
- Time zone: UTC+01:00 (CET)
  - Summer (DST): UTC+02:00 (CEST)
- INSEE/Postal code: 81169 /81300
- ^{1} French Land Register data, which excludes lakes, ponds, glaciers > 1 km^{2} (0.386 sq mi or 247 acres) and river estuaries.

Missècle (French pronunciation: [misɛkl]; Occitan: Missegle) is a commune in the Tarn department in southern France.

== See also ==
- Communes of the Tarn department
