= Graulhet =

- Commune
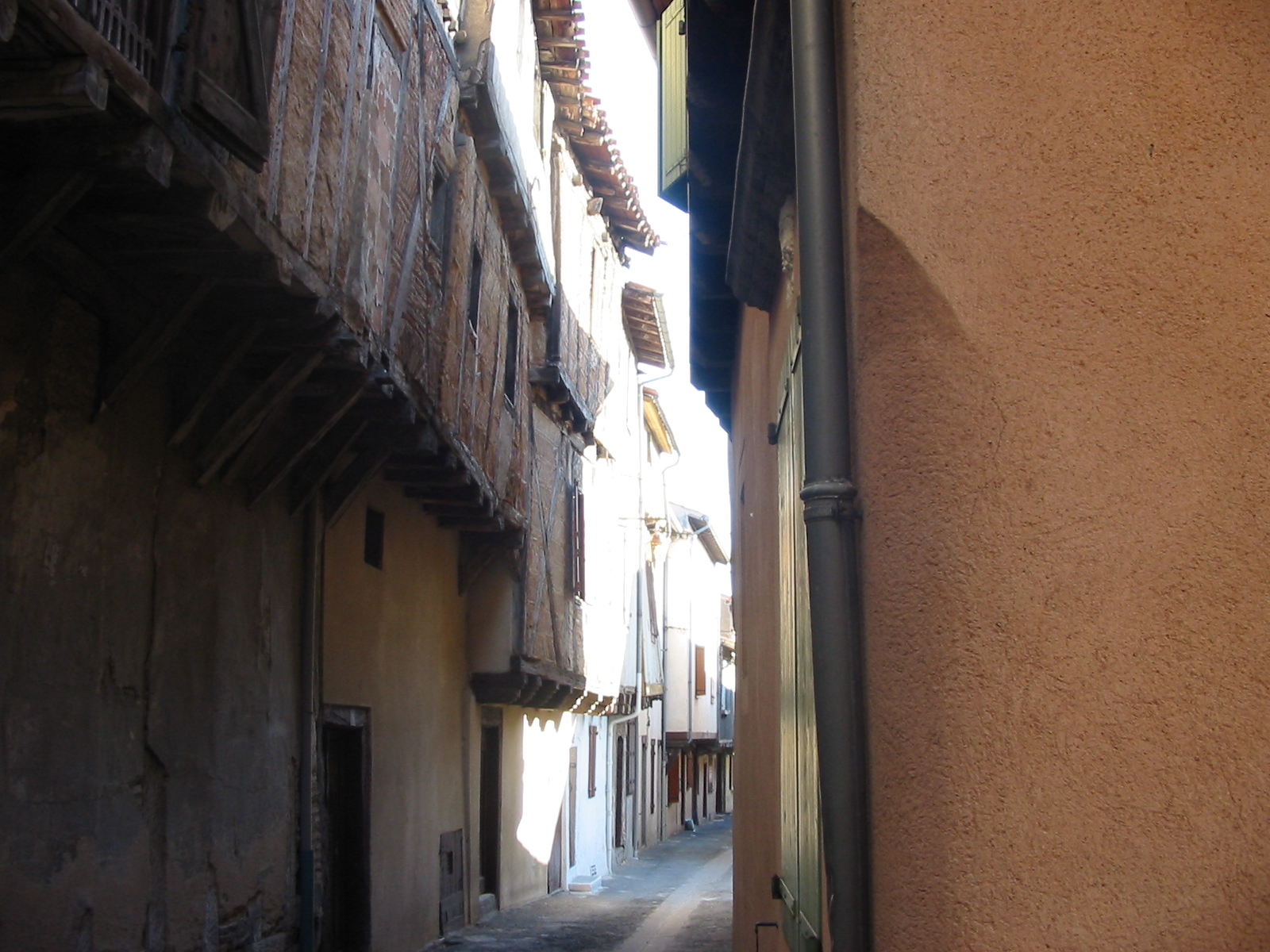
- An alleyway near the chateau, in Graulhet

- Coat of arms
- Location of Graulhet
- Location within France Location within Occitanie
- Coordinates: 43°45′42″N 1°59′21″E
- Country: France
- Region: Occitania
- Department: Tarn
- Arrondissement: Castres
- Canton: Graulhet
- Intercommunality: CA Gaillac-Graulhet

Government
  - Mayor (2020–2026): Blaise Aznar
- Area^{1}: 56.75 km^{2} (21.91 sq mi)
- Elevation: 160 m (520 ft)
- Highest elevation: 373 m (1,224 ft)
- Lowest elevation: 126 m (413 ft)
- Population (2023): 13,129
  - Density: 231.3/km^{2} (599.2/sq mi)
- Demonym: Graulhétois
- Time zone: UTC+01:00 (CET)
  - Summer (DST): UTC+02:00 (CEST)
- INSEE/Postal code: 81105 /81300
- ^{1} French Land Register data, which excludes lakes, ponds, glaciers > 1 km^{2} (0.386 sq mi or 247 acres) and river estuaries.

Graulhet (French pronunciation: [ɡʁojɛ]) is a commune in the Tarn department in southern France.

It is a centre of tanning. Leather was the main activity before this industry largely relocated to China. Graulhet is crossed by the river Dadou. Graulhet is also one of the last remaining places in the Midi where Mesturets are made traditionally.

The leading physician Marthe Condat was born here in 1886. She became the first woman to be a Professor of Medicine in France.

== Population ==
Historical population
Year	Pop.	±% p.a.
1968	12,073	—
1975	14,097	+2.24%
1982	13,543	−0.57%
1990	13,523	−0.02%
1999	12,663	−0.73%
2007	12,009	−0.66%
2012	11,890	−0.20%
2017	12,618	+1.20%
2023	13,129	+0.66%
Source: INSEE

== See also ==
- Communes of the Tarn department
