= Fayssac =

- Commune
- Coat of arms
- Location of Fayssac
- Location within France Location within Occitanie
- Coordinates: 43°57′19″N 1°58′23″E
- Country: France
- Region: Occitania
- Department: Tarn
- Arrondissement: Albi
- Canton: Les Deux Rives
- Intercommunality: CA Gaillac-Graulhet

Government
  - Mayor (2023–2026): Stéphanie Nadaï-Puech
- Area^{1}: 7.62 km^{2} (2.94 sq mi)
- Elevation: 210 m (690 ft)
- Highest elevation: 261 m (856 ft)
- Lowest elevation: 168 m (551 ft)
- Population (2023): 354
  - Density: 46.5/km^{2} (120/sq mi)
- Time zone: UTC+01:00 (CET)
  - Summer (DST): UTC+02:00 (CEST)
- INSEE/Postal code: 81087 /81150
- ^{1} French Land Register data, which excludes lakes, ponds, glaciers > 1 km^{2} (0.386 sq mi or 247 acres) and river estuaries.

Fayssac (French pronunciation: [fɛsak]; Occitan: Faiçac) is a commune in the Tarn department in southern France.

== See also ==
- Communes of the Tarn department
