= Salvagnac =

- Commune
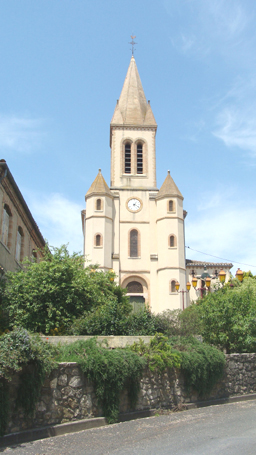
- The church in Salvagnac

- Coat of arms
- Location of Salvagnac
- Location within France Location within Occitanie
- Coordinates: 43°54′23″N 1°41′19″E
- Country: France
- Region: Occitania
- Department: Tarn
- Arrondissement: Albi
- Canton: Vignobles et Bastides
- Intercommunality: CA Gaillac-Graulhet

Government
  - Mayor (2020–2026): Barnard Miramond
- Area^{1}: 33.41 km^{2} (12.90 sq mi)
- Elevation: 234 m (768 ft)
- Highest elevation: 280 m (920 ft)
- Lowest elevation: 139 m (456 ft)
- Population (2023): 1,237
  - Density: 37.02/km^{2} (95.89/sq mi)
- Time zone: UTC+01:00 (CET)
  - Summer (DST): UTC+02:00 (CEST)
- INSEE/Postal code: 81276 /81630
- ^{1} French Land Register data, which excludes lakes, ponds, glaciers > 1 km^{2} (0.386 sq mi or 247 acres) and river estuaries.

Salvagnac (French pronunciation: [salvaɲak]; Occitan: Salvanhac) is a commune in the Tarn department in southern France.

== See also ==
- Communes of the Tarn department
