= Castanet, Tarn =

Castanet
- Commune
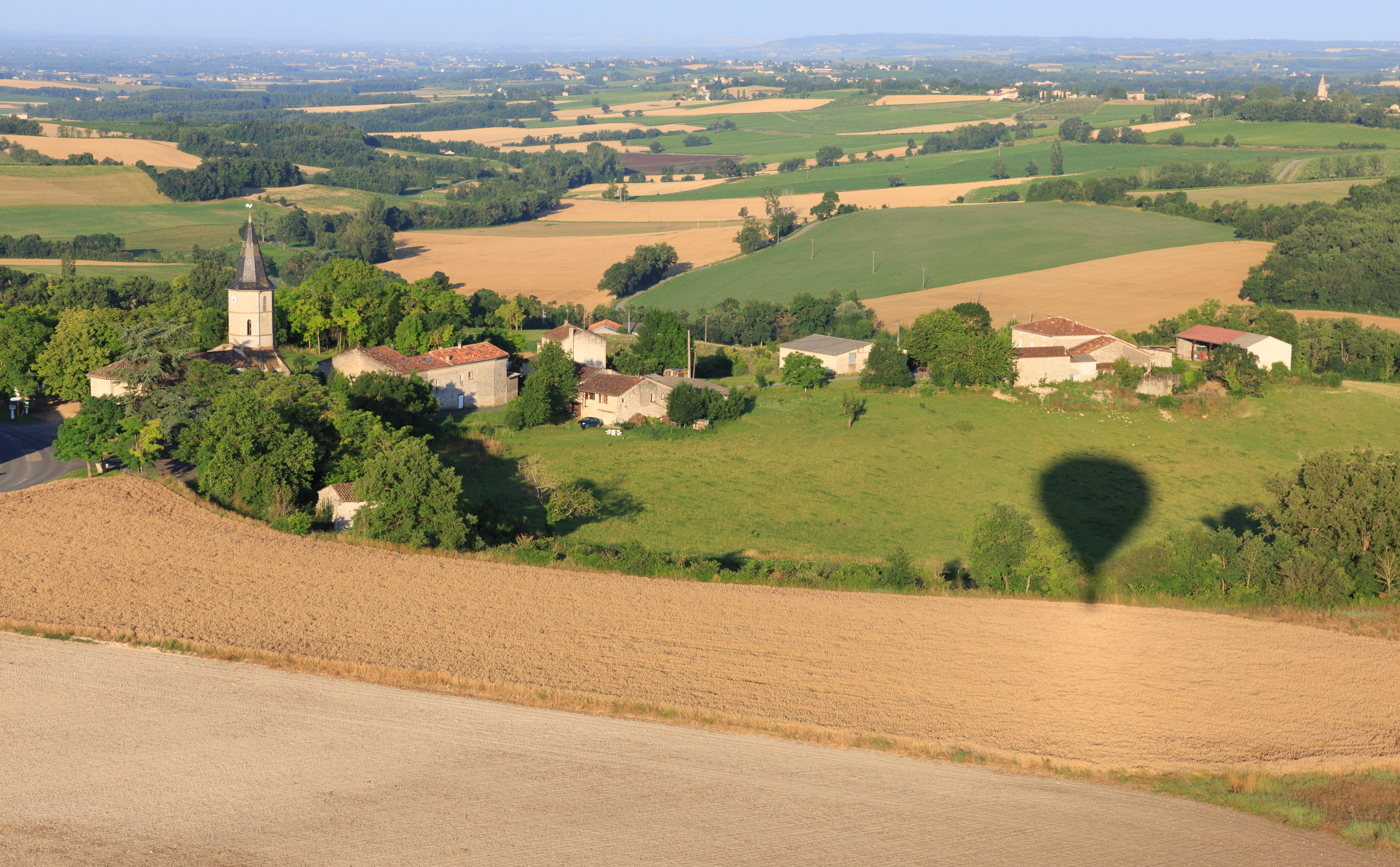
- Saint-André Church in Castanet
- Location of Castanet
- Location within France Location within Occitanie
- Coordinates: 43°58′33″N 2°01′49″E
- Country: France
- Region: Occitania
- Department: Tarn
- Arrondissement: Albi
- Canton: Les Deux Rives
- Intercommunality: CA Gaillac-Graulhet

Government
  - Mayor (2020–2026): Max Escaffre
- Area^{1}: 7.21 km^{2} (2.78 sq mi)
- Elevation: 270 m (890 ft)
- Highest elevation: 302 m (991 ft)
- Lowest elevation: 188 m (617 ft)
- Population (2023): 210
  - Density: 29/km^{2} (75/sq mi)
- Time zone: UTC+01:00 (CET)
  - Summer (DST): UTC+02:00 (CEST)
- INSEE/Postal code: 81061 /81150
- ^{1} French Land Register data, which excludes lakes, ponds, glaciers > 1 km^{2} (0.386 sq mi or 247 acres) and river estuaries.

Castanet is a commune in the Tarn department in southern France.

== See also ==
- Communes of the Tarn department
