= Rabastens =

- Commune
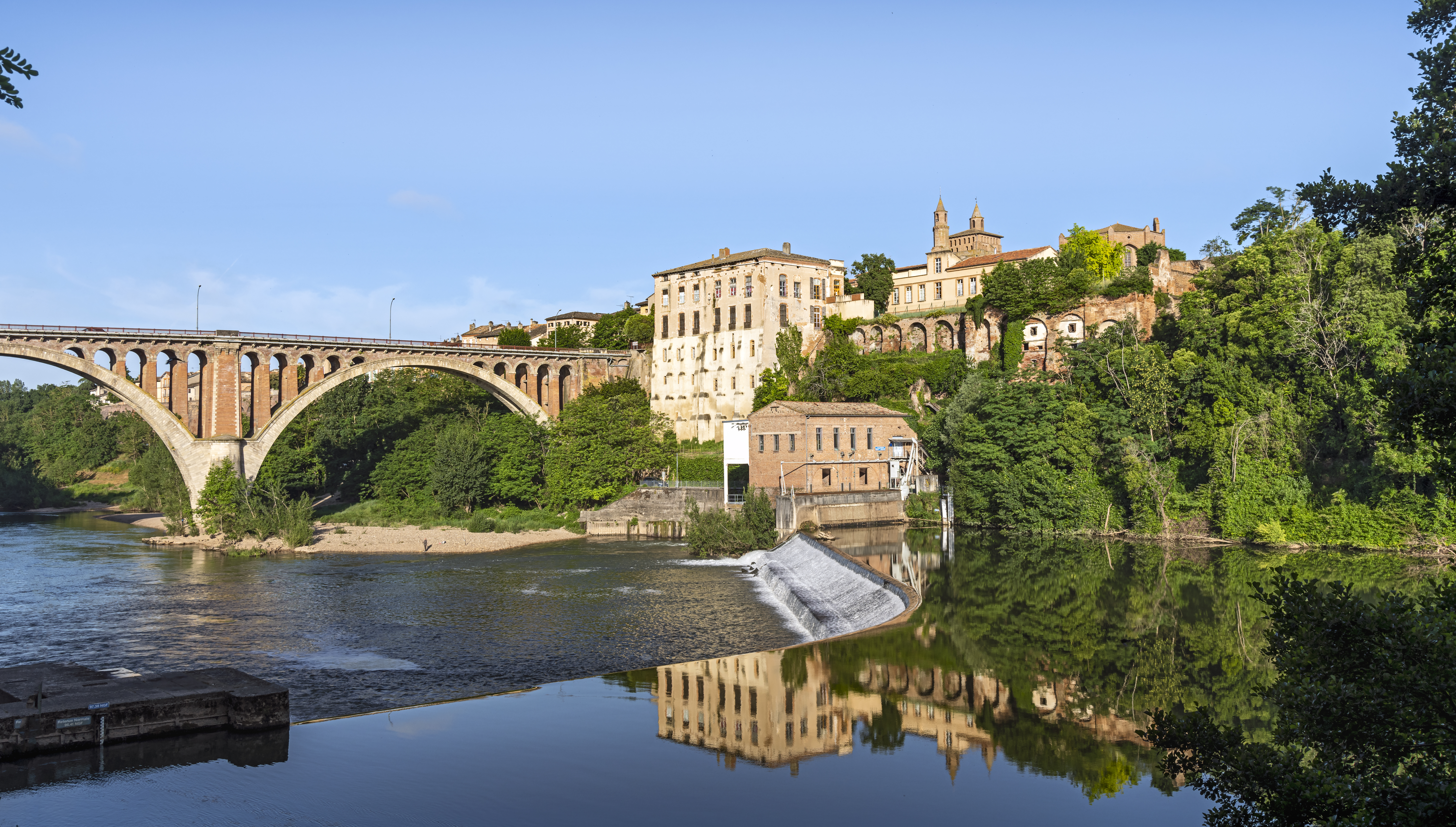
- Rabastens on the River Tarn

- Coat of arms
- Location of Rabastens
- Location within France Location within Occitanie
- Coordinates: 43°49′23″N 1°43′33″E
- Country: France
- Region: Occitania
- Department: Tarn
- Arrondissement: Albi
- Canton: Vignobles et Bastides
- Intercommunality: CA Gaillac-Graulhet

Government
  - Mayor (2020–2026): Nicolas Géraud
- Area^{1}: 66.29 km^{2} (25.59 sq mi)
- Elevation: 117 m (384 ft)
- Highest elevation: 252 m (827 ft)
- Lowest elevation: 95 m (312 ft)
- Population (2023): 5,867
  - Density: 88.51/km^{2} (229.2/sq mi)
- Time zone: UTC+01:00 (CET)
  - Summer (DST): UTC+02:00 (CEST)
- INSEE/Postal code: 81220 /81800
- ^{1} French Land Register data, which excludes lakes, ponds, glaciers > 1 km^{2} (0.386 sq mi or 247 acres) and river estuaries.

Rabastens (French pronunciation: [ʁabastɛ̃s]) is a commune in the southern French department of Tarn. The historian Gustave de Clausade (1815–1888) was born in Rabastens of which he became mayor in 1848.

On 23 July 1570, during the French Wars of Religion, the troops of Blaise de Montluc took the town and massacred most of the Protestant garrison.

== Population ==
Historical population
| Year | Pop. | ±% p.a. |
|---|---|---|
| 1968 | 4,307 | — |
| 1975 | 4,182 | −0.42% |
| 1982 | 3,806 | −1.34% |
| 1990 | 3,825 | +0.06% |
| 1999 | 4,176 | +0.98% |
| 2007 | 4,819 | +1.81% |
| 2012 | 5,187 | +1.48% |
| 2017 | 5,620 | +1.62% |
| 2023 | 5,867 | +0.72% |
Source: INSEE

== Transport ==
Rabastens-Couffouleux station has rail connections to Toulouse, Albi and Rodez.

== See also ==
- Communes of the Tarn department
- Constance de Rabastens
