= Tauriac, Tarn =

Tauriac
- Commune
- Coat of arms
- Location of Tauriac
- Location within France Location within Occitanie
- Coordinates: 43°53′05″N 1°35′34″E
- Country: France
- Region: Occitania
- Department: Tarn
- Arrondissement: Albi
- Canton: Vignobles et Bastides
- Intercommunality: CA Gaillac-Graulhet

Government
  - Mayor (2020–2026): Marie Granel
- Area^{1}: 9.92 km^{2} (3.83 sq mi)
- Elevation: 215 m (705 ft)
- Highest elevation: 231 m (758 ft)
- Lowest elevation: 124 m (407 ft)
- Population (2023): 413
  - Density: 41.6/km^{2} (108/sq mi)
- Time zone: UTC+01:00 (CET)
  - Summer (DST): UTC+02:00 (CEST)
- INSEE/Postal code: 81293 /81630
- ^{1} French Land Register data, which excludes lakes, ponds, glaciers > 1 km^{2} (0.386 sq mi or 247 acres) and river estuaries.

Tauriac (French pronunciation: [toʁjak]) is a commune in the Tarn department in southern France.

== See also ==
- Communes of the Tarn department
