= Moulayrès =

- Commune
- Coat of arms
- Location of Moulayrès
- Location within France Location within Occitanie
- Coordinates: 43°41′51″N 2°01′49″E
- Country: France
- Region: Occitania
- Department: Tarn
- Arrondissement: Castres
- Canton: Graulhet

Government
  - Mayor (2020–2026): Laurent Bazart
- Area^{1}: 8.85 km^{2} (3.42 sq mi)
- Elevation: 150 m (490 ft)
- Highest elevation: 375 m (1,230 ft)
- Lowest elevation: 205 m (673 ft)
- Population (2023): 217
  - Density: 24.5/km^{2} (63.5/sq mi)
- Time zone: UTC+01:00 (CET)
  - Summer (DST): UTC+02:00 (CEST)
- INSEE/Postal code: 81187 /81300
- ^{1} French Land Register data, which excludes lakes, ponds, glaciers > 1 km^{2} (0.386 sq mi or 247 acres) and river estuaries.

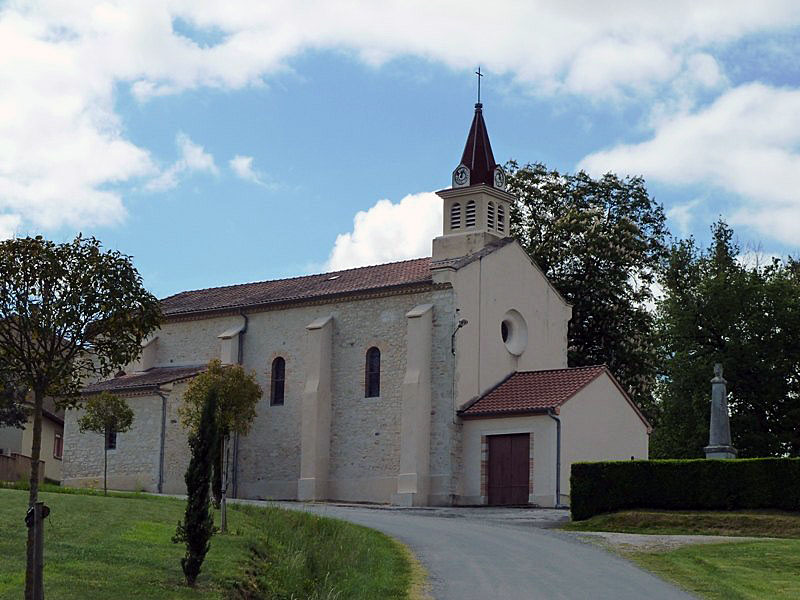
Church in Moulayrès

Moulayrès (French pronunciation: [mulɛʁɛs]; Occitan: Molairés) is a commune in the Tarn department in southern France.

== See also ==
- Communes of the Tarn department
