= Puybegon =

- Commune
- Coat of arms
- Location of Puybegon
- Location within France Location within Occitanie
- Coordinates: 43°47′28″N 1°53′46″E
- Country: France
- Region: Occitania
- Department: Tarn
- Arrondissement: Castres
- Canton: Graulhet
- Intercommunality: CA Gaillac-Graulhet

Government
  - Mayor (2020–2026): Robert Cinq
- Area^{1}: 19.01 km^{2} (7.34 sq mi)
- Elevation: 285 m (935 ft)
- Highest elevation: 322 m (1,056 ft)
- Lowest elevation: 117 m (384 ft)
- Population (2023): 661
  - Density: 34.8/km^{2} (90.1/sq mi)
- Time zone: UTC+01:00 (CET)
  - Summer (DST): UTC+02:00 (CEST)
- INSEE/Postal code: 81215 /81390
- ^{1} French Land Register data, which excludes lakes, ponds, glaciers > 1 km^{2} (0.386 sq mi or 247 acres) and river estuaries.

Puybegon (French pronunciation: [pɥibəɡɔ̃]; Occitan: Puègbegon) is a commune in the Tarn department in southern France.

== Geography ==
The commune is traversed by the river Dadou.

== See also ==
- Communes of the Tarn department
