= Lasgraisses =

Lasgraïsses
- Commune
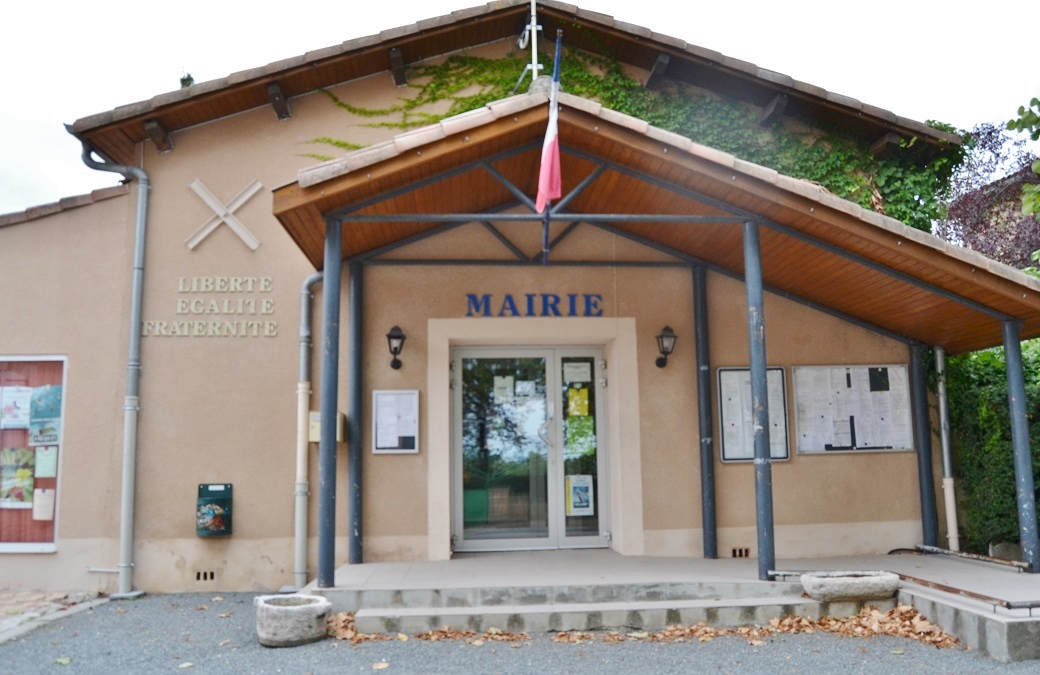
- Lasgraïsses Town hall

- Coat of arms
- Location of Lasgraïsses
- Location within France Location within Occitanie
- Coordinates: 43°49′16″N 2°02′19″E
- Country: France
- Region: Occitania
- Department: Tarn
- Arrondissement: Albi
- Canton: Les Deux Rives
- Intercommunality: CA Gaillac-Graulhet

Government
  - Mayor (2020–2026): Alain Assié
- Area^{1}: 12.22 km^{2} (4.72 sq mi)
- Elevation: 280 m (920 ft)
- Highest elevation: 270 m (890 ft)
- Lowest elevation: 182 m (597 ft)
- Population (2023): 559
  - Density: 45.7/km^{2} (118/sq mi)
- Time zone: UTC+01:00 (CET)
  - Summer (DST): UTC+02:00 (CEST)
- INSEE/Postal code: 81138 /81300
- ^{1} French Land Register data, which excludes lakes, ponds, glaciers > 1 km^{2} (0.386 sq mi or 247 acres) and river estuaries.

Lasgraisses (French pronunciation: [lasɡʁɛs]; Occitan: Las Graissas) is a commune in the Tarn department and Occitanie region of southern France.

== See also ==
- Communes of the Tarn department
