= Communauté d'agglomération Gaillac-Graulhet =

Gaillac-Graulhet
- Communauté d'agglomération
- Interactive map of Gaillac-Graulhet
- Coordinates: 43°53′N 01°51′E
- Country: France
- Region: Occitania
- Department: Tarn
- No. of communes: {{{nbcomm}}}
- Established: 2017
- Area: 1,148.9 km^{2} (443.6 sq mi)
- Population (2020): 74,383
  - Density: 64.743/km^{2} (167.68/sq mi)
- Website: www.gaillac-graulhet.fr

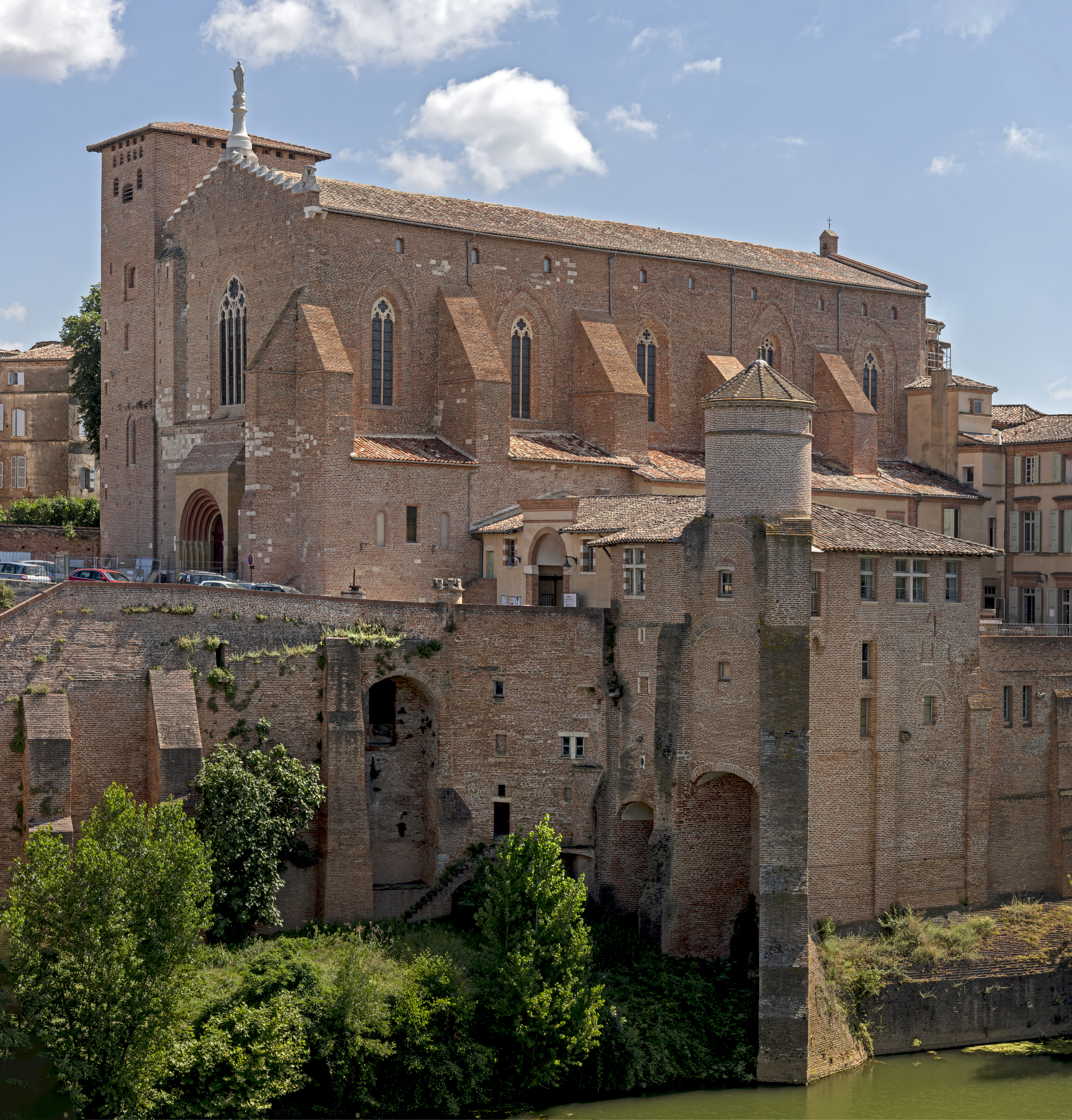
Building classed as a historical monument

Communauté d'agglomération Gaillac-Graulhet is the communauté d'agglomération, an intercommunal structure, centred on the towns of Gaillac and Graulhet. It is located in the Tarn department, in the Occitania region, southern France. Created in 2017, its seat is in Gaillac. In January 2023 the communes Amarens, Donnazac and Frausseilles left Gaillac-Graulhet and joined the Communauté de communes du Cordais et du Causse. Its area is 1148.9 km^{2}. Its population was 74,383 in 2020.

== Composition ==
The communauté d'agglomération consists of the following 56 communes:

1. Alos
2. Andillac
3. Aussac
4. Beauvais-sur-Tescou
5. Bernac
6. Brens
7. Briatexte
8. Broze
9. Busque
10. Cadalen
11. Cahuzac-sur-Vère
12. Campagnac
13. Castanet
14. Castelnau-de-Montmiral
15. Cestayrols
16. Coufouleux
17. Fayssac
18. Fénols
19. Florentin
20. Gaillac
21. Giroussens
22. Graulhet
23. Grazac
24. Itzac
25. Labastide-de-Lévis
26. Labessière-Candeil
27. Lagrave
28. Larroque
29. Lasgraisses
30. Lisle-sur-Tarn
31. Loupiac
32. Mézens
33. Montans
34. Montdurausse
35. Montels
36. Montgaillard
37. Montvalen
38. Parisot
39. Peyrole
40. Puybegon
41. Puycelsi
42. Rabastens
43. Rivières
44. Roquemaure
45. Saint-Beauzile
46. Sainte-Cécile-du-Cayrou
47. Saint-Gauzens
48. Saint-Urcisse
49. Salvagnac
50. La Sauzière-Saint-Jean
51. Senouillac
52. Tauriac
53. Técou
54. Tonnac
55. Le Verdier
56. Vieux
