= Constance de Rabastens =

French visionary

Constance de Rabastens (13??–1386) was one of the female visionaries who concerned herself with politics in the late fourteenth century. Many visionaries emerged in the late fourteenth century who predicted the future of the Church. Visionaries often claimed that their visions came from God and that the Church should listen to what is being told. Unlike Catherine of Siena and Marie Robine, other visionaries of the Great Schism, Constance was denied any official recognition and Constance at one point she had to extract herself from an inquisitorial interrogation only with great difficulty. During the Great Schism there were multiple popes, the pope and the antipope, and Constance's denial of any official recognition was because she endorsed the "wrong" pope through her divinely inspired prophetic pronouncements. Little is known about Constance's life as her confessor, Raymond de Sabanac (law professor at the University of Toulouse), decided not to write about her life and decided to only write about her visions. Although not much is known about Constance's life, there are documents about her visions and the letters she wrote to the inquisitor of Toulouse that are preserved in a Catalan translation in the Bibliothèque nationale de France. Most of Constance's visions were put together by her confessor, Raymond de Sabanac, but some series of visions were transmitted to Raymond by Constance's son.

== Personal life ==
Constance de Rabastens was from a small town about half-way between Toulouse and Albi. She had a series of dramatic visions between 1384 and 1386 and attempted to intervene in the politics of her time. The turning point of Constance's life was when she took a trip to Toulouse. Leaving Rabastens and taking a trip to Toulouse made herself known to the ecclesiastical authorities that became aware of her visionary activities. Unfortunately, there are no traces of herself other than her visions and the letters she wrote to the inquisitor of Toulouse. There are no documents mentioning her and there are no traces of her in the works of other authors. The little we know about Constance is that she had a daughter, a son who is a Benedictine monk in Toulouse, and a husband. Constance became a widow as she lost her husband during her early forties and, at one point, she was in prison. There is nothing more heard of Constance after 1386.

One aspect of Constance's life is the relationship with her confessor, Raimond de Sabanac. Raimond was who put together all of Constance's visions as he transcribed the visions for her. At one point in their relationship, Raimond stopped transcribing for Constance. Constance articulated this problem in one of her letters to the inquisitor of Toulouse as she asked for a secretary that can transcribe her visions. As Constance's visions became more public and known to the authorities of the church, they were ordered to cease the visions and the transcriptions. Despite Raimond's best efforts, Constance refused to be the perfect visionary and her headstrong support of the "wrong" pope, Pope Urban VI, could not be considered orthodox. Searching for an answer, Raimond asked God for a sign whether he should write or not, such as taking away his eyesight. Raimond only resumed to write for Constance as he was struck by an illness that the Voice identified as a sign from God.

=== Education ===
There seems to have been no information about Constance's education or background but according to the visions she had, she admitted to not knowing the Book of Revelation. Constance never indicated she did any particular reading and any literacy Constance admits seems to have been of miraculous origin. Most of the thirteenth-century saintly women often claimed ignorance and often professed unlearnedness to emphasize that the source of the visions was divine and not human.

=== Politics ===
Constance became involved with politics during the Great Schism. Constance claimed she was called upon to proclaim that archbishop of Toulouse backed the wrong pope in the Great Schism and will go to hell. The Great Schism of the Western Church began as the French cardinals voted Pope Urban VI and retracted their vote in order to replace him with Antipope Clement VII. This created chaos as the church had created both the pope and the antipope. Compared to Marie Robine and Catherine of Siena, Constance's intervention in politics did not go well because she supported the "wrong" pope of her region as she supported the Pope Urban VI instead of Antipope Clement VII. Also, her convictions were contradictory as she was loyal to the French king, who supported Clement VII, and she worshiped Gaston III, Count of Foix, who remained neutral in most conflicts. As Constance's voice became more public, Guillaume de Luc, a master of the archbishop's entourage, has forbidden Raimond de Sabanac in writing down Constance's visions. Although Constance was consulted by highly placed people, she was still accused of being crazy and she did not have the kind of support Catherine of Siena had. Although Christ chose her to explain the Holy Scriptures, according to her visions, it was not enough to confirm the divine origin of her visions to the inquisitor of Toulouse as they took it as a challenge to the authority. In 1385, Constance was taken in chains to the inquisitor of Toulouse, forbidden to publish her visions, and imprisoned. Constance was imprisoned for publicizing a series of apocalyptic revelations, and in one of the letter Constance notes that she was accused of "having a demon in her body," though predictably she claimed direct inspiration from God. A couple of instances of official queries displayed Constance's presence in the public arena. The first instance was when a baron of the Bordelais asked her about Saracens who came to France looking for some sort of treasure. Constance informed him that the Saracens are the disciples of the Antichrist who sought to defeat the Christians. The second instance was when a clerk wanted to know from her whether the death of the Duke of Anjou is advantageous for the cause of the Church.

== The Visions ==
Constance's visions started in 1384 as her husband faced death. Her first vision was a crowd of dead people accompanied by the voice with great mortality and her husband died shortly afterwards. Constance is called as "a sinful woman" by Christ but despite the sinfulness and her inability to read, she interpreted the scriptures to learned men as she received divine interventions. Most of Constance's visions were Christ appearing and encouraging her to preach and to urge the French nobility to stand against the English. Overall, Constance's visions cover her personal experience of Christ and intimate identification with Christ's pain. Constance uses her visions to accomplish her rather well defined and urgent political missions. After the initial vision, Constance's visions were mostly of an auditory nature. Instead of interpreting complicated visions, the Voices provided a ready-made script and allowed the mystics to supersede the authority, which required support of respected confessors and the orthodox church in order to speak the voice of God outside of the convent. In one of her vision, Christ appears as a man dressed in satin to assure her that he is in her heart. After another vision, Constance wonders whether the visions and the Voices are truly from God as the Voice presents the Book of Revelation.

Constance defined her political mission as she was commanded by the Voice. The Voice commanded Constance to send a letter to the King's Council in Toulouse to stop the support for the pope at Avignon, Clement VII. Following the Voice's command, Constance used strong terms and colorful images in her denunciation that leaves no doubts about the nature of her political intervention

She saw, for instance, the Avignon pope Clement VII in a temple filled with smoke, being menaced by a sword-wielding angel; or as a limping man bringing down the ship of the Church.

— Rubin, Miri, Medieval Christianity in Practice. p. 294.

In Constance's visions, the French cardinals who elected Clement VII are compared to false prophets who knew well that the election of the pope of Avignon was done against God's will. To counteract the false prophets, she stated that the red beast, the pope of Rome, will rise. The red beast was spoken by John in the Book of Revelation and the color red signifies the fire of justice. Constance also designated the cardinals as “anticardonals” who surround the “antipapal” of Avignon. Constance presented this pope in many unpleasant ways: She saw a temple full of smoke and darkness and the pope of Avignon was inside. Later, she also saw three ships which two signified the world and the church. She stated that a limping man entered one of the former and made the ship instantly sink to the bottom of the sea. This limping man represented the Pope of Avignon. She also saw an angel holding a bloody sword above the pope as if he were about to kill him.

Around the same time period, similar to Constance's vision, Honoré Bonet's exegesis of the Apocalypse displayed smoke rising from the pit and covering up the sun of the church (representing the pope). Although Blumenfeld-Kosinski states, "people in different time periods and areas created imagery and depicted emotions that were quite similar and that expressed their anguish and uncertainty in the face of multiple popes" during 1384–1386, when Constance had her visions, Bonet spent time in Constance's region composing a history of the Count of Foix, including Constance's savior figure, Gaston III, Count of Foix. No acquaintance between Constance and Bonet can be made but there are certain coincidences in the images portrayed by them.

Ultimately, what Constance saw as her primary mission is articulated by the voice as it told her "do not doubt, for I tell you that the time has come for the Son of Man to show his power and it will be shown in you. For you are a woman and through woman was the faith preserved and through woman it will be revealed; and that woman is you." Most of Constance's visions and prophecies were never fulfilled except for one, when she predicted the madness of Charles VI of France in 1385.

== The Letters to the Inquisitor ==
The six letters to the inquisitor were written early on in her visionary career (1384), when Raimond stopped writing for her due to fear and restrictions. In these letters, Constance showed her desire for safety as there was urgency in her voice. Constance, aware of the riskiness of her proclamations, warned the inquisitor that the voice promised divine vengeance on Toulouse for any harm done to her. She insisted that this threat came from the voice and not from her. She wrote that she will abide by their counsel but insisted that she will not cease her visions. Since Raimond was not writing for her, Constance even asked the inquisitor for secretaries who would record and disseminate her visions. Constance even warned the inquisitor of his impending death and insisted that an accurate transcript of the trial be made but no transcript of the trial was ever found.

=== Letter One ===
Constance stated that her confessor, Raimond, will not write anything for her except for the letter. She stated in her letter that she was told by God to write to the inquisitor because he did not want to believe the things that he sent through Constance. During Constance's conversation with God, she tells him that no one will believe her but God insists saying, “I command you once, twice, three times to tell them, so they will have no excuses. And you are not the one who is speaking, but it is the Holy Spirit that speaks in you.” She told the inquisitor to hold a council regarding God's commands or she fears that God will avenge himself on those who meddled in on the choosing of Clement VII. She also told the inquisitor that she was afraid sending this letter because of the things told by her confessor but God told her not to be afraid because it is time the bad seeds should be thrown out for the good ones.

=== Letter Two ===
Constance wrote again to notify the inquisitor of the things happening to her as she was having more visions than before. In the letter, she stated that her confessor does not want to write her visions down. She told the inquisitor that she was told by God to write to him but because he took it badly, he should put his heart to guarding his sheep as the bad days are coming. She told the inquisitor of the voice that spoke to her, “tell the inquisitor that before long he will be interrogated and that he should not fear death, and that the trial did not take place for nothing, and that he should watch that the record corresponds to what was said at the trial, and that God tells him that he will have to render an account of the trial and the record.”

=== Letter Three ===
In this letter, Constance stated that she is writing this letter because she is afraid that God will reprimand her for negligence if she does not write. Constance stated that the voice told her, “write to the inquisitor that he should preach the misfortunes that are prepared for the evil ones, for the days of trembling are approaching. For this reason, he should take care of the souls for it is his responsibility that, if the people of God is deceived out of ignorance, they will receive their punishment.” She also told the story of her conversation about how she told God that no one will believe her but God told her that because she carried his seal, Holy Scriptures, people should receive her well. Constance told the inquisitor more stories of the conversation between her and God and that the inquisitor should have prayers said to God and arrange processions, considering what she has seen.

=== Letter Four ===
As she continued to write to the inquisitor, Constance stated that the more she resisted the visions and revelations, the more they continued and more than before. Constance spoke about the vision she had which consisted of three cardinals that was in great torment and pain and one of them being more tormented compared to the other two. She revealed that the cardinal who was tormented the most was Sir Pierre de la Barriere and that she told this to her confessor. Constance stated that the confessor told her to reject the vision because it was untrue since he knew no one of the first name Pierre and that de la Barriere is a good person. Contradicting her confessor, Constance had a vision which told her that, “you should know that what you have seen is true, no matter what your confessor says. Know that his first name is really Pierre and that he can be compared to a stone, that is, the stone that brought the worst destruction to the path, and the stone on which the good seed fell but could not flourish. He preached lies and false errors before the king. He is not content with his own damnation, but wants to pull others into damnation with him. He is called la Barriere because he established a barrier between me and himself.” She stated that she was told to notify the inquisitor of these things completely and at length. Constance continued to describe her visions in this letter of Pierre being punished and also that she is afraid their failure to publish her visions will result in Christian faith falling into disgrace. Constance told the inquisitor that she is prepared to die for God's honor and the salvation of the people. As she closed out the letter, she cried out for the inquisitor's trust in her visions and requested for an answer. There was an urgency in Constance's voice, to convince the inquisitor that her visions are indeed real, as she tried to prove herself by stating that she is explaining the Holy Scriptures to him when she does not know them.

=== Letter Five ===
Constance sent this letter to the inquisitor, the collector, and to the Lord Yncart in 1384. Constance stated that because she has been told not to reveal her visions other than to her confessor and the inquisitor, she has been withholding them but she is worried because the visions are showing many revelations that concern the damnation of the community. She told the inquisitor that it will be hers and his fault if her revelations are true and the great damnation comes. Constance demanded for secretaries, as her confessor does not want to write for her, that can write down her revelations because she had been ordered to tell, shout, and trumpet her revelations by God.

=== Letter Six ===
In the final letter, Constance talked about the visions that has been revealed to her about the two men sent to English, that made league with the English, by the price of the realm of France. Constance stated that, “They have sworn and denied God and his power and accepted the demon as their lord. And he will give all his help and support to the English king against the young tree, that is the French king, and if he can he will destroy the king and his realm, just as Pilate, when he was governor of Jerusalem, did not recognize our God who was from Jerusalem.” Constance also stated that the “crane with a vimilion head” will come and destroy the prince and that there will be a great alliance between the French king and the crane. Constance wished that all of her revelations are transmitted to the inquisitor so he knows who is the prince in question.

== Bibliography ==
- Barstow, Anne Llewellyn. "Mystical Experience as a Feminist Weapon: Joan of Arc." Women's Studies Quarterly, (1985): 26. Accessed March 28, 2016. https://www.jstor.org/stable/40003571.
- Blumenfeld-Kosinski, Renate. "Constance de Rabastens: Politics and Visionary Experience in the Time of the Great Schism." Mystics Quarterly, (1999): 147. Accessed March 25, 2016. https://www.jstor.org/stable/20717381.
- Blumenfeld-Kosinski, Renate. Poets, Saints, and Visionaries of the Great Schism, 1378–1417. University Park, PA: Pennsylvania State University Press, 2006.
- Caciola, Nancy. "Mystics, Demoniacs, and the Physiology of Spirit Possession in Medieval Europe." Comparative Studies in Society and History, (2000): 268. Accessed March 28, 2016. https://www.jstor.org/stable/2696607.
- Rubin, Miri. Medieval Christianity in Practice. Princeton, NJ: Princeton University Press, 2009.
- Venarde, Bruce L., Renate Blumenfeld-Kosinski, Simone Zanacchi, and Raymond De Sabanac. Two Women of the Great Schism. Toronto: Iter Inc., 2010.
