= Montels, Tarn =

Montels
- Commune
- Location of Montels
- Location within France Location within Occitanie
- Coordinates: 43°57′48″N 1°53′40″E
- Country: France
- Region: Occitania
- Department: Tarn
- Arrondissement: Albi
- Canton: Vignobles et Bastides
- Intercommunality: CA Gaillac-Graulhet

Government
  - Mayor (2020–2026): Ludovic Rau
- Area^{1}: 3.23 km^{2} (1.25 sq mi)
- Elevation: 230 m (750 ft)
- Highest elevation: 285 m (935 ft)
- Lowest elevation: 219 m (719 ft)
- Population (2023): 110
  - Density: 34/km^{2} (88/sq mi)
- Time zone: UTC+01:00 (CET)
  - Summer (DST): UTC+02:00 (CEST)
- INSEE/Postal code: 81176 /81140
- ^{1} French Land Register data, which excludes lakes, ponds, glaciers > 1 km^{2} (0.386 sq mi or 247 acres) and river estuaries.

Montels is a commune in the Tarn department in southern France.

== See also ==
- Communes of the Tarn department
