= Lagrave =

- Commune
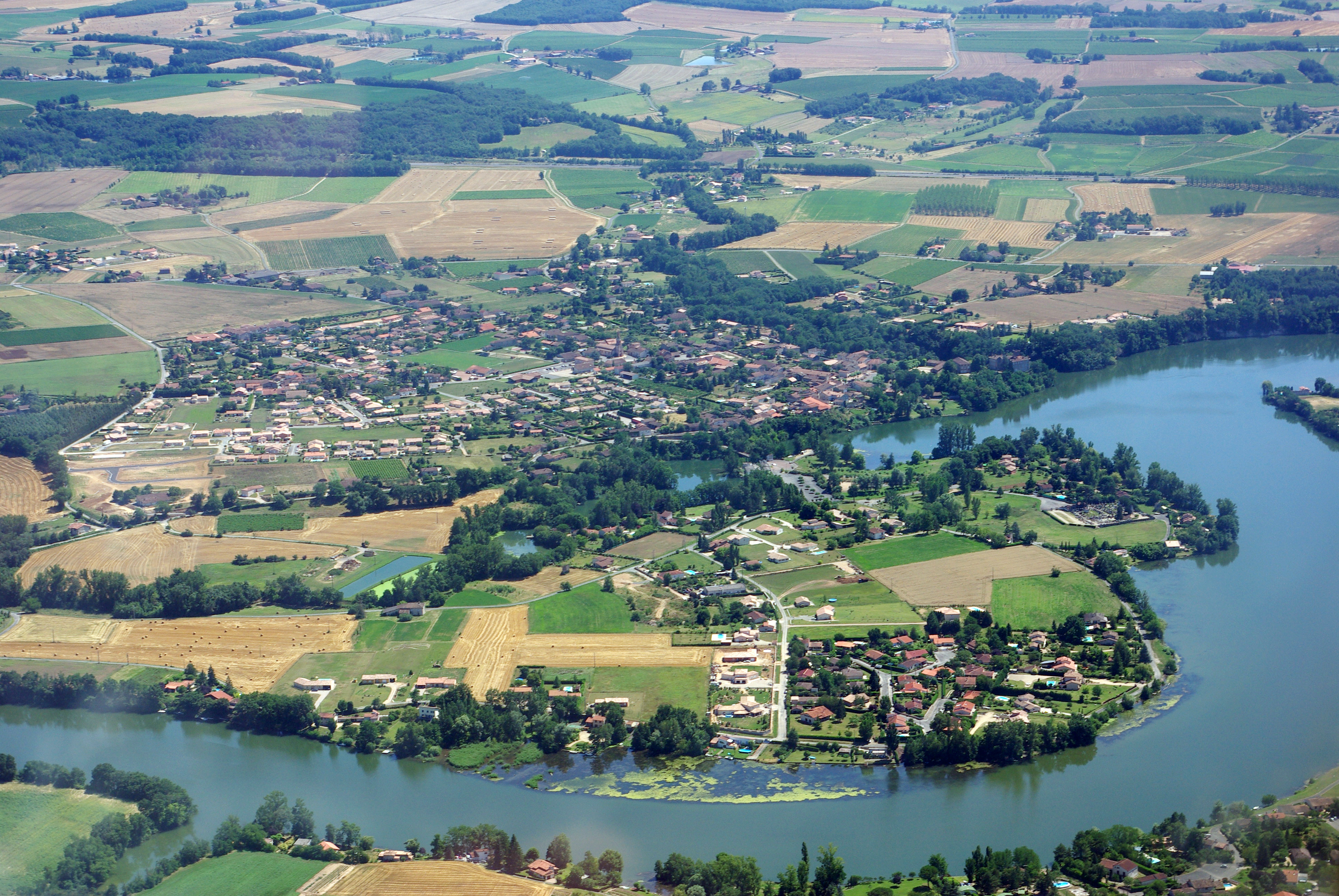
- An aerial view of Lagrave

- Coat of arms
- Location of Lagrave
- Location within France Location within Occitanie
- Coordinates: 43°53′55″N 1°59′35″E
- Country: France
- Region: Occitania
- Department: Tarn
- Arrondissement: Albi
- Canton: Les Deux Rives
- Intercommunality: CA Gaillac-Graulhet

Government
  - Mayor (2020–2026): Max Moulis
- Area^{1}: 9.46 km^{2} (3.65 sq mi)
- Elevation: 155 m (509 ft)
- Highest elevation: 205 m (673 ft)
- Lowest elevation: 135 m (443 ft)
- Population (2023): 2,305
  - Density: 244/km^{2} (631/sq mi)
- Time zone: UTC+01:00 (CET)
  - Summer (DST): UTC+02:00 (CEST)
- INSEE/Postal code: 81131 /81150
- ^{1} French Land Register data, which excludes lakes, ponds, glaciers > 1 km^{2} (0.386 sq mi or 247 acres) and river estuaries.

Lagrave (French pronunciation: [laɡʁav]; Occitan: La Grava) is a commune in the Tarn department in the Occitania region of southern France.

== History ==
The terraces which surround the plain of the village have known human occupation since the most remote times. The places called Nareille, Las Peyrouses, Les Ganelles, Les Gounelles are known for their prehistoric resort.

The Romans under Julius Caesar conquered what is now the Tarn department in the 1st century BC. The Roman occupation lasted five centuries during which time Rome imposed its laws and language on the region. Their presence in Lagrave is attested by the discovery of medals and coins minted under the Roman emperors Claudius, Titus, Trajan, Septimius Severus and Augustus.

== Population ==
Historical population
Year	Pop.	±% p.a.
1968	618	—
1975	630	+0.28%
1982	816	+3.76%
1990	940	+1.78%
1999	1,264	+3.35%
2007	1,718	+3.91%
2012	1,952	+2.59%
2017	2,140	+1.86%
2023	2,305	+1.25%
Source: INSEE

== See also ==
- Communes of the Tarn department
