= Montgaillard, Tarn =

Montgaillard
- Commune
- Coat of arms
- Location of Montgaillard
- Location within France Location within Occitanie
- Coordinates: 43°54′37″N 1°35′47″E
- Country: France
- Region: Occitania
- Department: Tarn
- Arrondissement: Albi
- Canton: Vignobles et Bastides
- Intercommunality: CA Gaillac-Graulhet

Government
  - Mayor (2020–2026): Jean-Claude Bourgeade
- Area^{1}: 14.95 km^{2} (5.77 sq mi)
- Elevation: 148 m (486 ft)
- Highest elevation: 235 m (771 ft)
- Lowest elevation: 127 m (417 ft)
- Population (2023): 362
  - Density: 24.2/km^{2} (62.7/sq mi)
- Time zone: UTC+01:00 (CET)
  - Summer (DST): UTC+02:00 (CEST)
- INSEE/Postal code: 81178 /81630
- ^{1} French Land Register data, which excludes lakes, ponds, glaciers > 1 km^{2} (0.386 sq mi or 247 acres) and river estuaries.

Montgaillard (French pronunciation: [mɔ̃ɡajaʁ]; Occitan: Montgalhard) is a commune in the Tarn department in southern France.

== See also ==
- Communes of the Tarn department
