= Briatexte =

- Commune
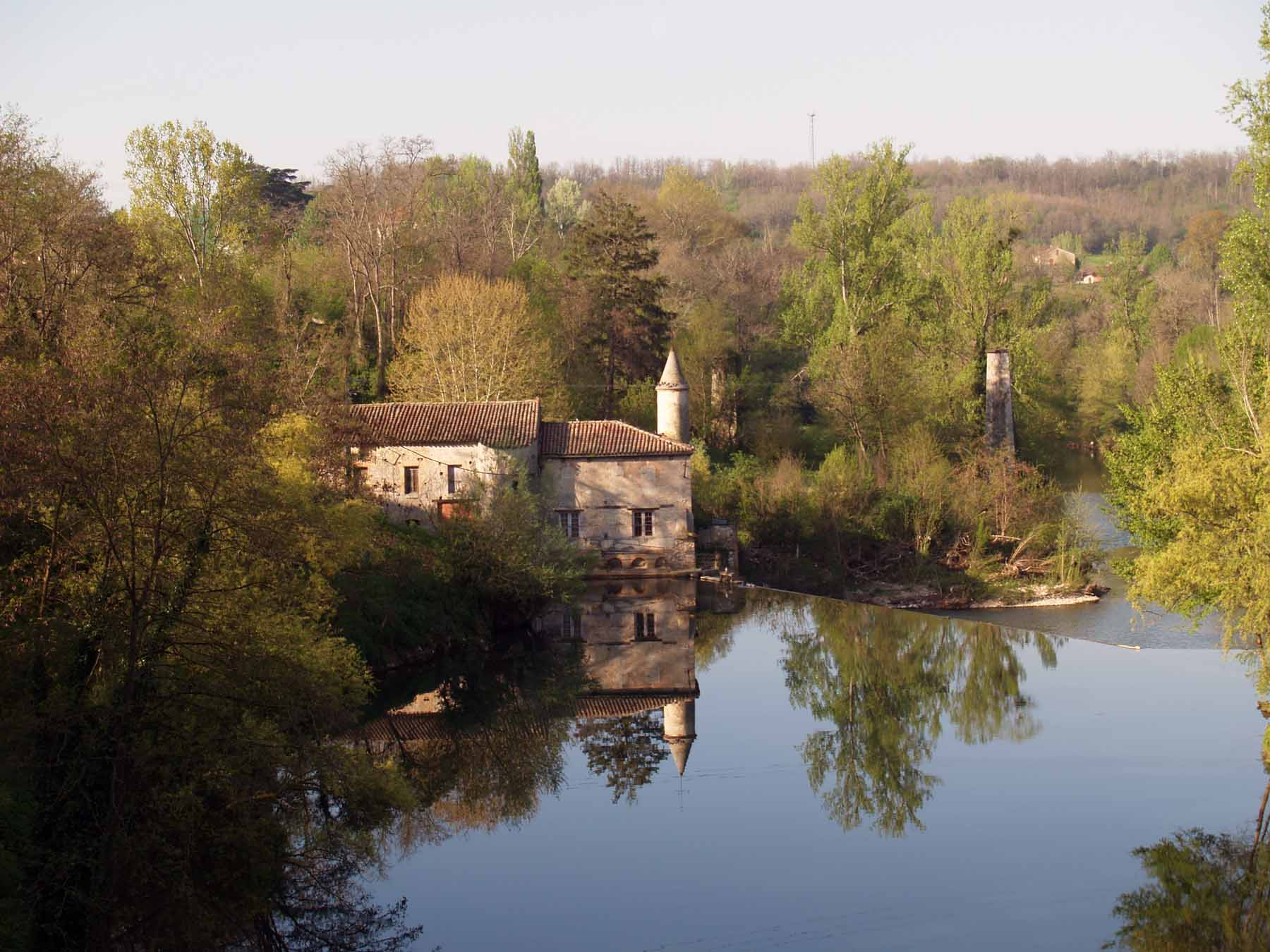
- The Dadou

- Coat of arms
- Location of Briatexte
- Location within France Location within Occitanie
- Coordinates: 43°45′07″N 1°54′31″E
- Country: France
- Region: Occitania
- Department: Tarn
- Arrondissement: Castres
- Canton: Graulhet
- Intercommunality: CA Gaillac-Graulhet

Government
  - Mayor (2020–2026): Alain Glade
- Area^{1}: 15 km^{2} (5.8 sq mi)
- Elevation: 150 m (490 ft)
- Highest elevation: 294 m (965 ft)
- Lowest elevation: 119 m (390 ft)
- Population (2023): 1,938
  - Density: 130/km^{2} (330/sq mi)
- Time zone: UTC+01:00 (CET)
  - Summer (DST): UTC+02:00 (CEST)
- INSEE/Postal code: 81039 /81390
- ^{1} French Land Register data, which excludes lakes, ponds, glaciers > 1 km^{2} (0.386 sq mi or 247 acres) and river estuaries.

Briatexte (French pronunciation: [bʁijatɛkst]; Occitan: Britèsta) is a commune in the Tarn department in southern France.

== Geography ==
The river Dadou flows westward through the northern part of the commune and crosses the village.

== Population ==
Historical population
Year	Pop.	±% p.a.
1968	1,546	—
1975	1,791	+2.12%
1982	1,865	+0.58%
1990	1,800	−0.44%
1999	1,662	−0.88%
2007	1,770	+0.79%
2012	2,008	+2.56%
2017	2,016	+0.08%
2023	1,938	−0.66%
Source: INSEE

== See also ==
- Communes of the Tarn department
