= Parisot, Tarn =

Parisot
- Commune
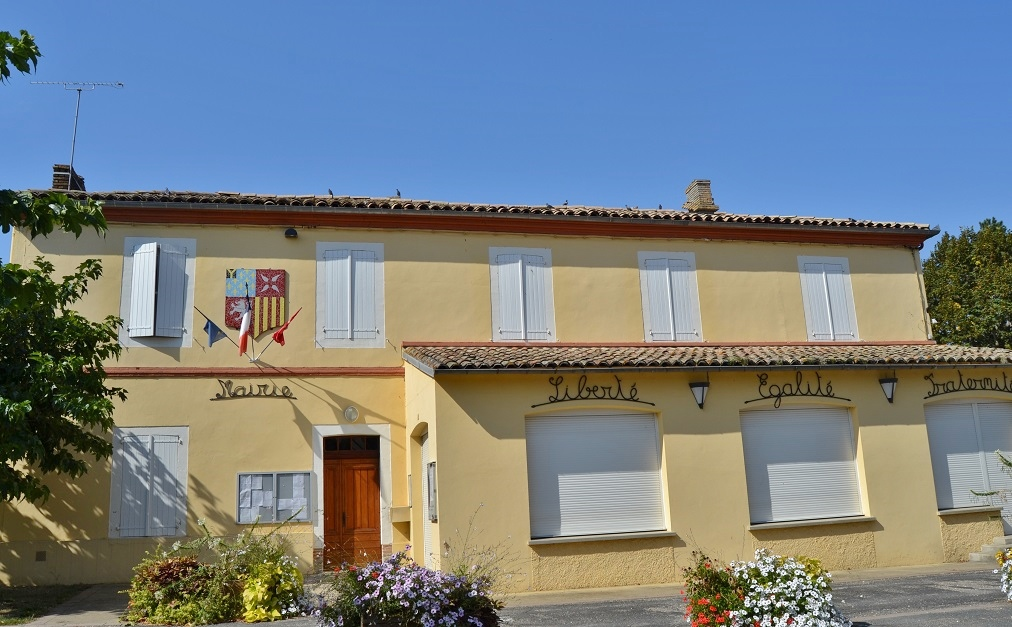
- The town hall in Parisot

- Coat of arms
- Location of Parisot
- Location within France Location within Occitanie
- Coordinates: 43°47′59″N 1°49′58″E
- Country: France
- Region: Occitania
- Department: Tarn
- Arrondissement: Albi
- Canton: Les Deux Rives
- Intercommunality: CA Gaillac-Graulhet

Government
  - Mayor (2020–2026): Sébastien Charruyer
- Area^{1}: 28.99 km^{2} (11.19 sq mi)
- Elevation: 206 m (676 ft)
- Highest elevation: 296 m (971 ft)
- Lowest elevation: 115 m (377 ft)
- Population (2023): 1,033
  - Density: 35.63/km^{2} (92.29/sq mi)
- Time zone: UTC+01:00 (CET)
  - Summer (DST): UTC+02:00 (CEST)
- INSEE/Postal code: 81202 /81310
- ^{1} French Land Register data, which excludes lakes, ponds, glaciers > 1 km^{2} (0.386 sq mi or 247 acres) and river estuaries.

Parisot (French pronunciation: [paʁizo]; Occitan: Parisòt) is a commune in the Tarn department in southern France.

== See also ==
- Communes of the Tarn department
