= Montans =

- Commune
- Coat of arms
- Location of Montans
- Location within France Location within Occitanie
- Coordinates: 43°52′02″N 1°53′10″E
- Country: France
- Region: Occitania
- Department: Tarn
- Arrondissement: Albi
- Canton: Les Deux Rives
- Intercommunality: CA Gaillac-Graulhet

Government
  - Mayor (2020–2026): Gilles Crouzet
- Area^{1}: 32.43 km^{2} (12.52 sq mi)
- Elevation: 106 m (348 ft)
- Highest elevation: 209 m (686 ft)
- Lowest elevation: 95 m (312 ft)
- Population (2023): 1,558
  - Density: 48.04/km^{2} (124.4/sq mi)
- Time zone: UTC+01:00 (CET)
  - Summer (DST): UTC+02:00 (CEST)
- INSEE/Postal code: 81171 /81600
- ^{1} French Land Register data, which excludes lakes, ponds, glaciers > 1 km^{2} (0.386 sq mi or 247 acres) and river estuaries.

Montans (French pronunciation: [mɔ̃tɑ̃s]) is a commune in the Tarn department and Occitanie region of southern France.

== Geography ==
Situated between Lisle-sur-Tarn and Gaillac, near the A68 autoroute, the village stands at the end of a terrace overlooking the River Tarn. The locality produces wine with the appellation Gaillac AOC.

== Name ==
The name of the settlement is derived from the Occitan word montant, meaning "steep".

== History ==
The site of Montans was occupied by a Gallic oppidum. Already, the Gauls were producing pottery on the site since the environment was favorable with the alluvium covering the terrace containing pockets of clay. Following the Roman occupation, the site became in the beginning of AD one of the most important centers of pottery production in the Gallo-Roman world. The pottery was exported, mostly by water down the Tarn and Garonne rivers all the way to places like Brittany and Great Britain.

== Tourism ==
L'Archéosite is a museum and documentation center, with an exhibition of pottery from Antiquity and a reconstitution of a Gallo-Roman street and shops leading to the potter's house.

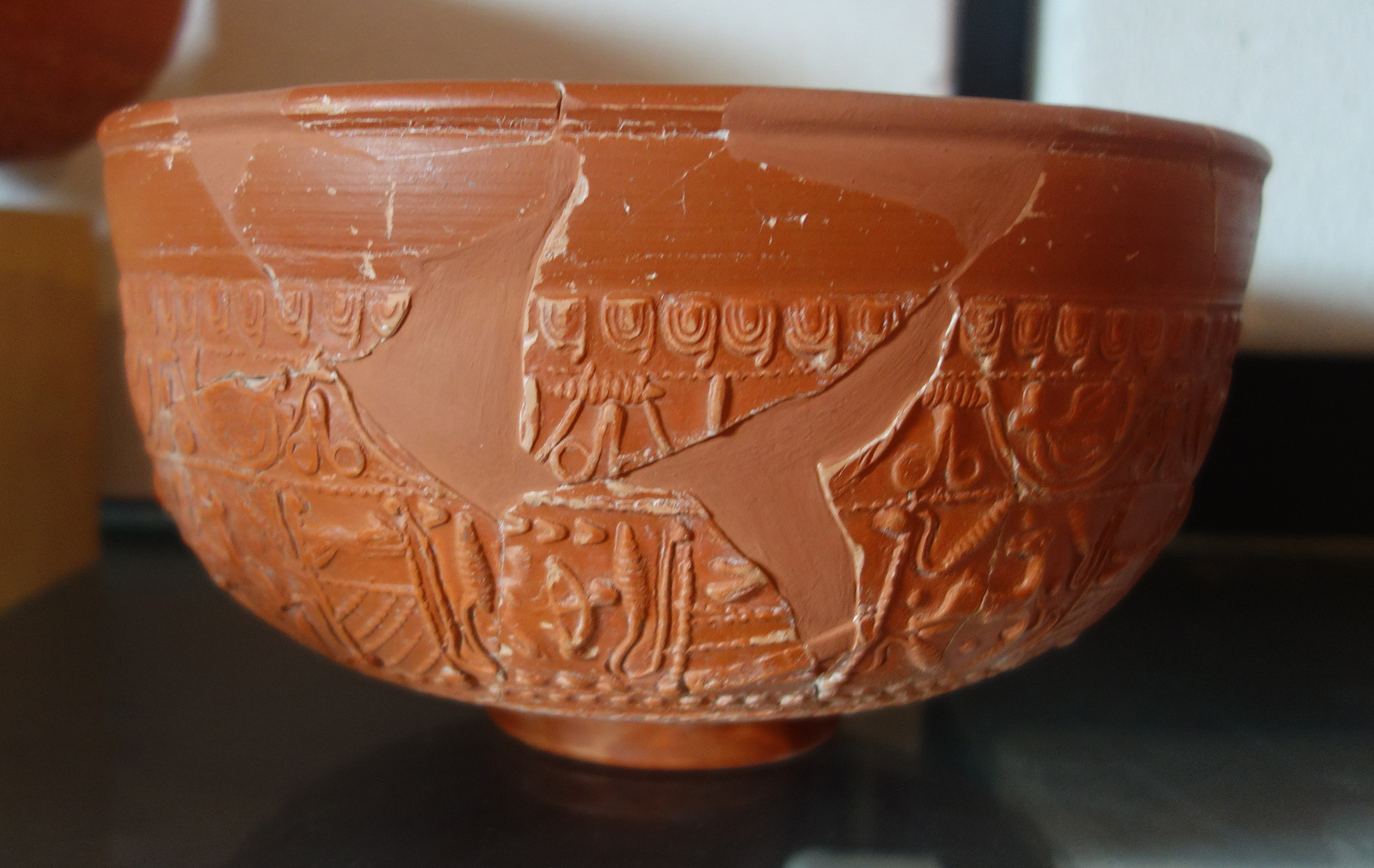
Roman Samian ware (terra sigillata) bowl, manufactured at Montans, and photographed in the Montans 'Archeosite' museum

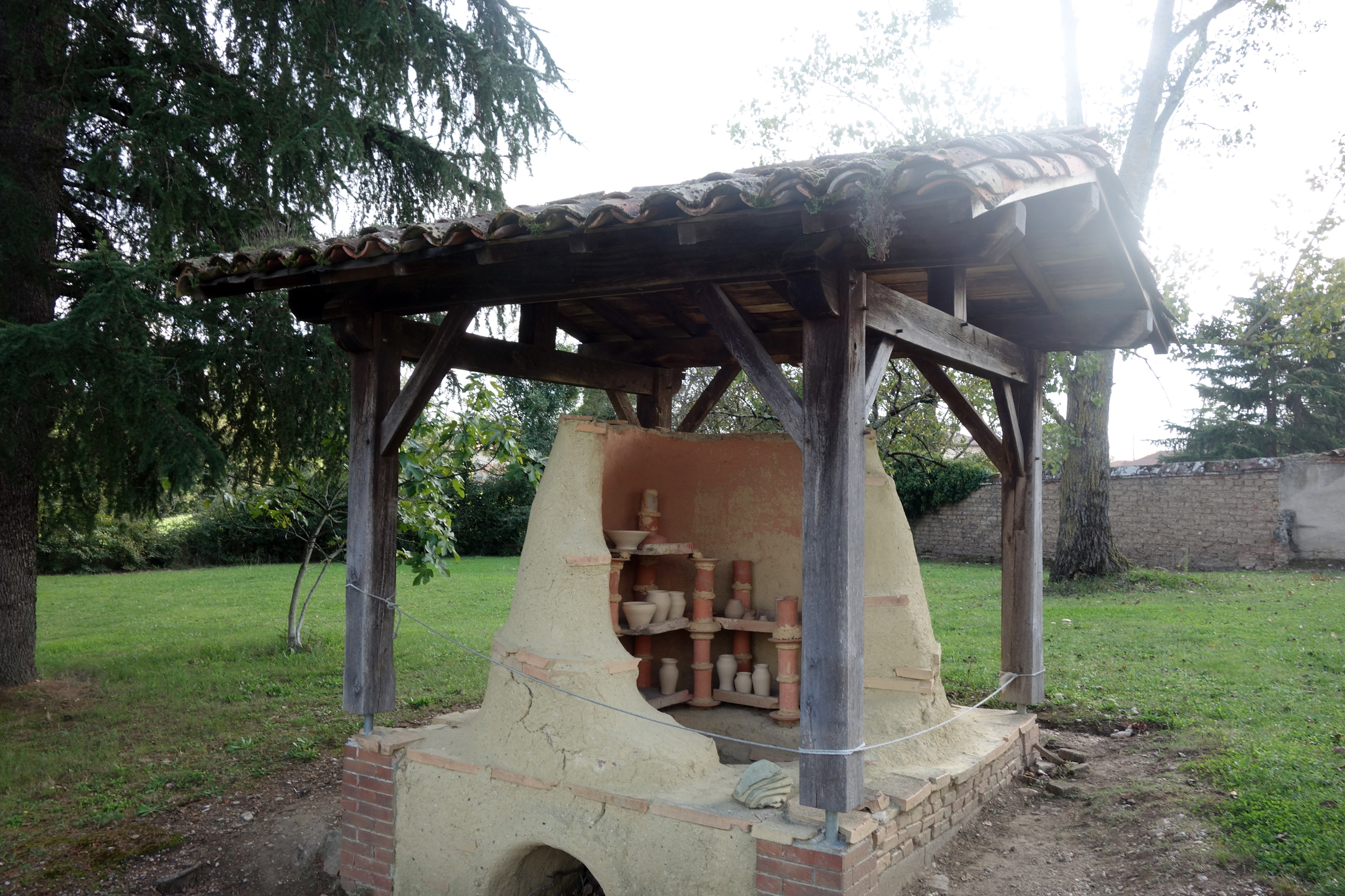
Roman pottery kiln, as reconstructed in the Montans archeosite museum in France

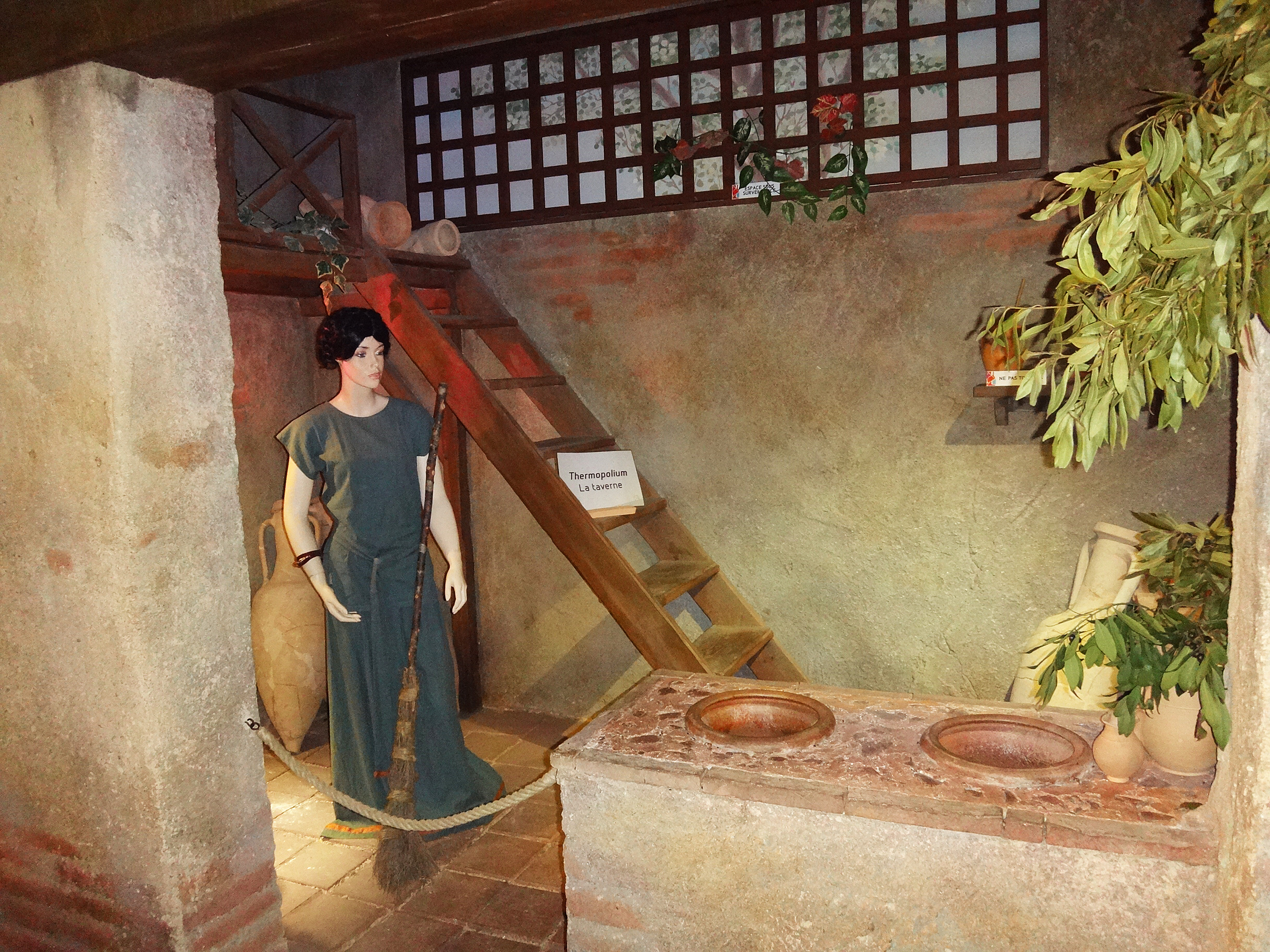
Roman fast-food shop, Pompeii style, as reconstructed in the Montans archeosite museum, in France.

== See also ==
- Communes of the Tarn department
- Tourism in Tarn
