= Busque =

- Commune
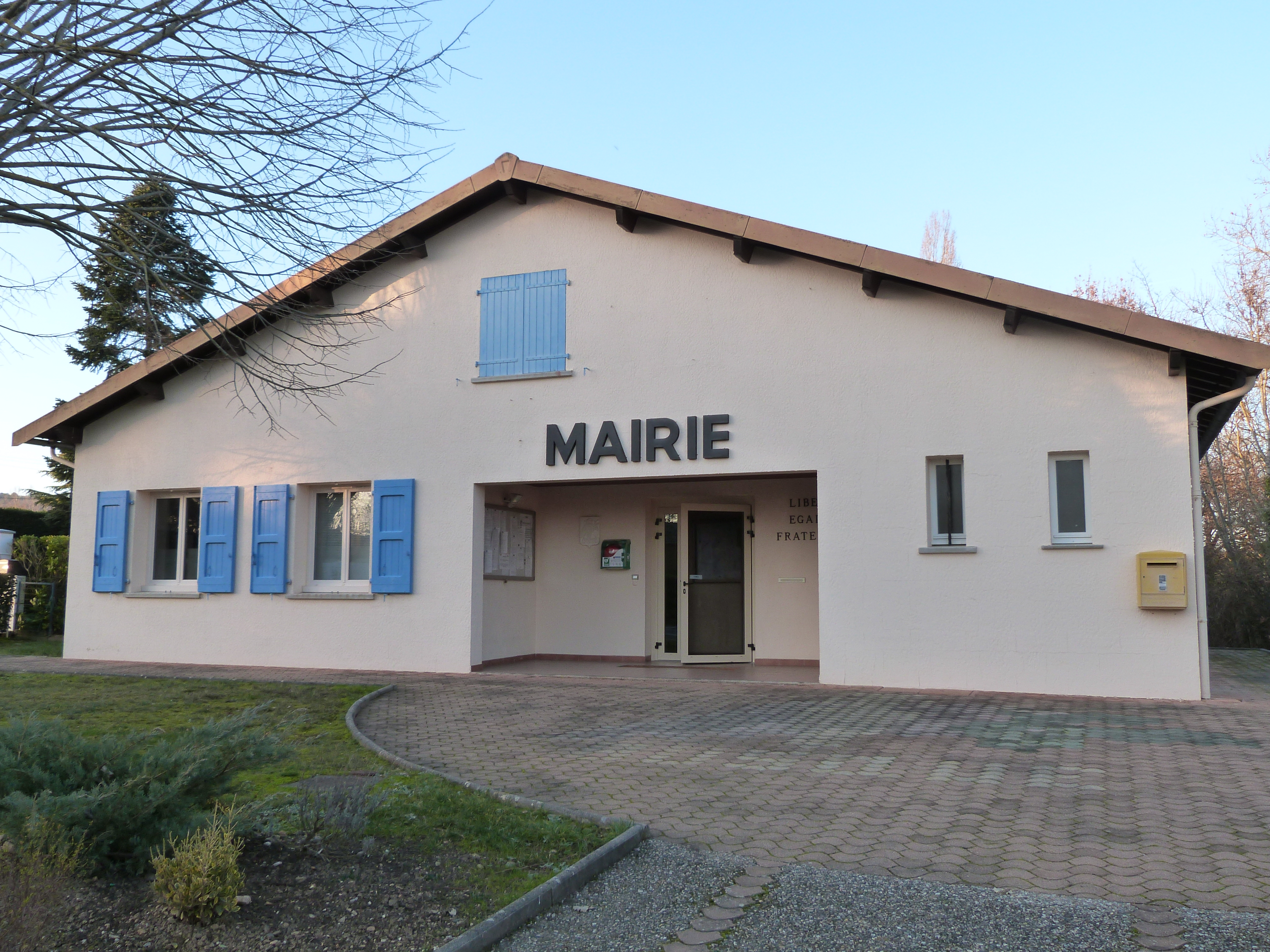
- Busque Town hall
- Location of Busque
- Location within France Location within Occitanie
- Coordinates: 43°47′01″N 1°57′32″E
- Country: France
- Region: Occitania
- Department: Tarn
- Arrondissement: Castres
- Canton: Graulhet
- Intercommunality: CA Gaillac-Graulhet

Government
  - Mayor (2020–2026): Bertrand Bouyssie
- Area^{1}: 8.38 km^{2} (3.24 sq mi)
- Elevation: 150 m (490 ft)
- Highest elevation: 332 m (1,089 ft)
- Lowest elevation: 136 m (446 ft)
- Population (2023): 715
  - Density: 85.3/km^{2} (221/sq mi)
- Time zone: UTC+01:00 (CET)
  - Summer (DST): UTC+02:00 (CEST)
- INSEE/Postal code: 81043 /81300
- ^{1} French Land Register data, which excludes lakes, ponds, glaciers > 1 km^{2} (0.386 sq mi or 247 acres) and river estuaries.

Busque (French pronunciation: [bysk]; Occitan: Buscas) is a commune in the Tarn department in southern France.

== See also ==
- Communes of the Tarn department
