= Alos, Tarn =

Alos
- Commune
- Location of Alos
- Location within France Location within Occitanie
- Coordinates: 44°01′30″N 1°52′41″E
- Country: France
- Region: Occitania
- Department: Tarn
- Arrondissement: Albi
- Canton: Vignobles et Bastides
- Intercommunality: CA Gaillac-Graulhet

Government
  - Mayor (2020–2026): Alain Cauderan
- Area^{1}: 6.32 km^{2} (2.44 sq mi)
- Elevation: 230 m (750 ft)
- Highest elevation: 286 m (938 ft)
- Lowest elevation: 198 m (650 ft)
- Population (2023): 93
  - Density: 15/km^{2} (38/sq mi)
- Time zone: UTC+01:00 (CET)
  - Summer (DST): UTC+02:00 (CEST)
- INSEE/Postal code: 81007 /81140
- ^{1} French Land Register data, which excludes lakes, ponds, glaciers > 1 km^{2} (0.386 sq mi or 247 acres) and river estuaries.

Alos is a commune of the Tarn department in southern France.

== See also ==
- Communes of the Tarn department
