= Saint-Beauzile =

- Commune
- Coat of arms
- Location of Saint-Beauzile
- Location within France Location within Occitanie
- Coordinates: 44°01′19″N 1°49′53″E
- Country: France
- Region: Occitania
- Department: Tarn
- Arrondissement: Albi
- Canton: Vignobles et Bastides
- Intercommunality: CA Gaillac-Graulhet

Government
  - Mayor (2020–2026): Philippe Baptiste
- Area^{1}: 9.23 km^{2} (3.56 sq mi)
- Elevation: 262 m (860 ft)
- Highest elevation: 466 m (1,529 ft)
- Lowest elevation: 192 m (630 ft)
- Population (2023): 125
  - Density: 13.5/km^{2} (35.1/sq mi)
- Time zone: UTC+01:00 (CET)
  - Summer (DST): UTC+02:00 (CEST)
- INSEE/Postal code: 81243 /81140
- ^{1} French Land Register data, which excludes lakes, ponds, glaciers > 1 km^{2} (0.386 sq mi or 247 acres) and river estuaries.

Saint-Beauzile (French pronunciation: [sɛ̃ bozil]; Occitan: Sant Bausèli) is a commune in the Tarn department in southern France.

== See also ==
- Communes of the Tarn department
