= Aussac =

- Commune
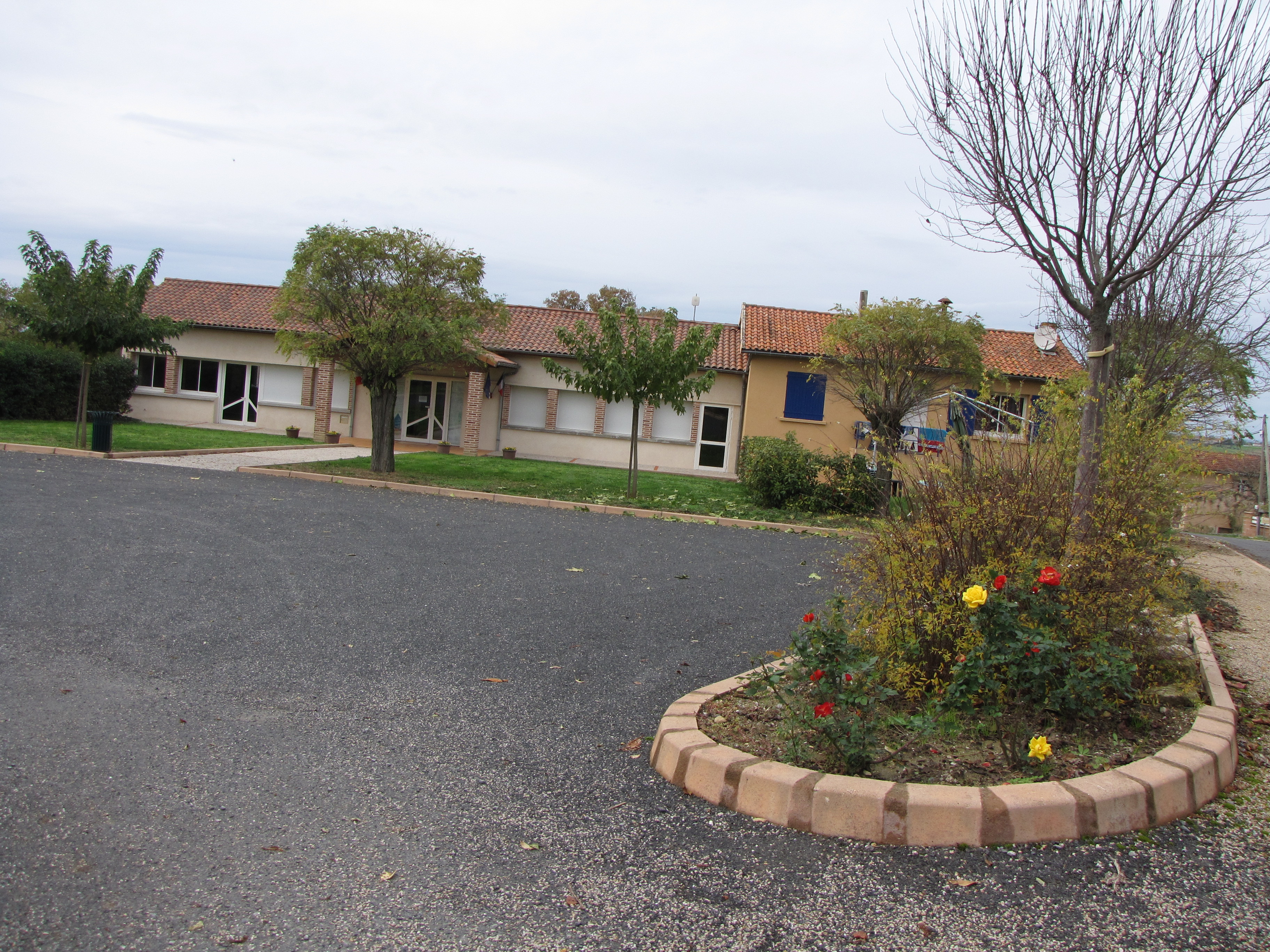
- The town hall in Aussac

- Coat of arms
- Location of Aussac
- Location within France Location within Occitanie
- Coordinates: 43°51′57″N 2°02′28″E
- Country: France
- Region: Occitania
- Department: Tarn
- Arrondissement: Albi
- Canton: Les Deux Rives
- Intercommunality: CA Gaillac-Graulhet

Government
  - Mayor (2023–2026): Benoit Tragne
- Area^{1}: 6.06 km^{2} (2.34 sq mi)
- Elevation: 200 m (660 ft)
- Highest elevation: 233 m (764 ft)
- Lowest elevation: 165 m (541 ft)
- Population (2023): 255
  - Density: 42.1/km^{2} (109/sq mi)
- Time zone: UTC+01:00 (CET)
  - Summer (DST): UTC+02:00 (CEST)
- INSEE/Postal code: 81020 /81600
- ^{1} French Land Register data, which excludes lakes, ponds, glaciers > 1 km^{2} (0.386 sq mi or 247 acres) and river estuaries.

Aussac (French pronunciation: [osak]; Occitan: Auçac) is a commune of the Tarn department in southern France.

== See also ==
- Communes of the Tarn department
