= Senouillac =

- Commune
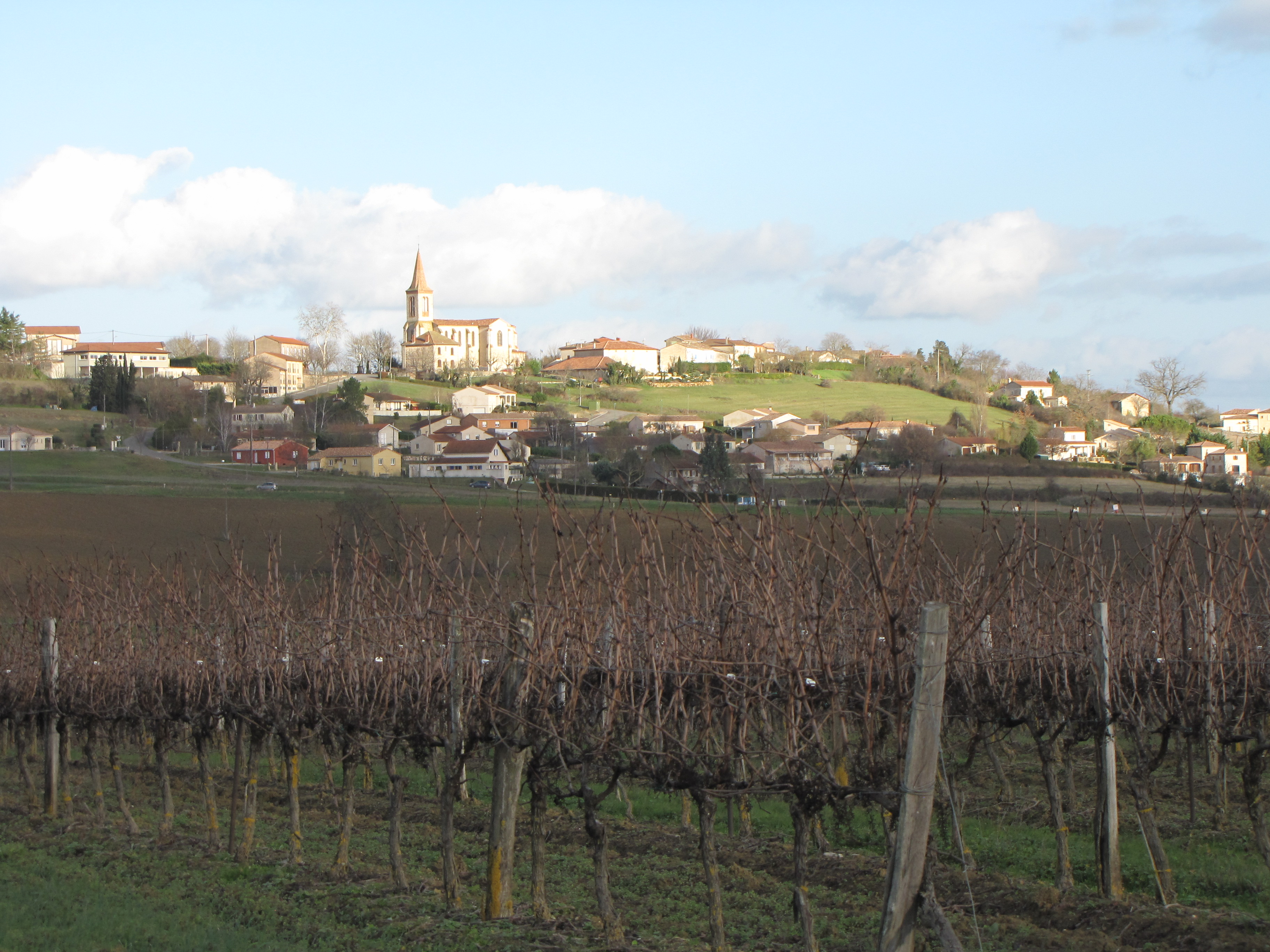
- The Gaillac Vineyard with Senouillac beyond

- Coat of arms
- Location of Senouillac
- Location within France Location within Occitanie
- Coordinates: 43°56′33″N 1°57′03″E
- Country: France
- Region: Occitania
- Department: Tarn
- Arrondissement: Albi
- Canton: Les Deux Rives
- Intercommunality: CA Gaillac-Graulhet

Government
  - Mayor (2020–2026): Bernard Ferret
- Area^{1}: 15.01 km^{2} (5.80 sq mi)
- Elevation: 216 m (709 ft)
- Highest elevation: 245 m (804 ft)
- Lowest elevation: 147 m (482 ft)
- Population (2023): 1,123
  - Density: 74.82/km^{2} (193.8/sq mi)
- Time zone: UTC+01:00 (CET)
  - Summer (DST): UTC+02:00 (CEST)
- INSEE/Postal code: 81283 /81600
- ^{1} French Land Register data, which excludes lakes, ponds, glaciers > 1 km^{2} (0.386 sq mi or 247 acres) and river estuaries.

Senouillac (French pronunciation: [sənujak]; Occitan: Senolhac) is a commune in the Tarn department in southern France.

== See also ==
- Communes of the Tarn department
