= Fénols =

- Commune
- Coat of arms
- Location of Fénols
- Location within France Location within Occitanie
- Coordinates: 43°50′52″N 2°03′13″E
- Country: France
- Region: Occitania
- Department: Tarn
- Arrondissement: Albi
- Canton: Les Deux Rives
- Intercommunality: CA Gaillac-Graulhet

Government
  - Mayor (2020–2026): Jean-Marc Molle
- Area^{1}: 6 km^{2} (2.3 sq mi)
- Elevation: 200 m (660 ft)
- Highest elevation: 225 m (738 ft)
- Lowest elevation: 174 m (571 ft)
- Population (2023): 244
  - Density: 41/km^{2} (110/sq mi)
- Time zone: UTC+01:00 (CET)
  - Summer (DST): UTC+02:00 (CEST)
- INSEE/Postal code: 81090 /81600
- ^{1} French Land Register data, which excludes lakes, ponds, glaciers > 1 km^{2} (0.386 sq mi or 247 acres) and river estuaries.

Fénols (French pronunciation: [fenɔl]; Occitan: Fenòls) is a commune in the Tarn department in southern France.

== See also ==
- Communes of the Tarn department
