= Canton of Les Deux Rives =

Coordinates: 43.90°N 2.00°E

The canton of Les Deux Rives is an administrative division of the Tarn department, southern France. It was created at the French canton reorganisation which came into effect in March 2015. Its seat is in Lagrave.

It consists of the following communes:

1. Aussac
2. Bernac
3. Cadalen
4. Castanet
5. Cestayrols
6. Fayssac
7. Fénols
8. Florentin
9. Labastide-de-Lévis
10. Labessière-Candeil
11. Lagrave
12. Lasgraisses
13. Montans
14. Parisot
15. Peyrole
16. Rivières
17. Senouillac
18. Técou
