= Campagnac, Tarn =

Campagnac
- Commune
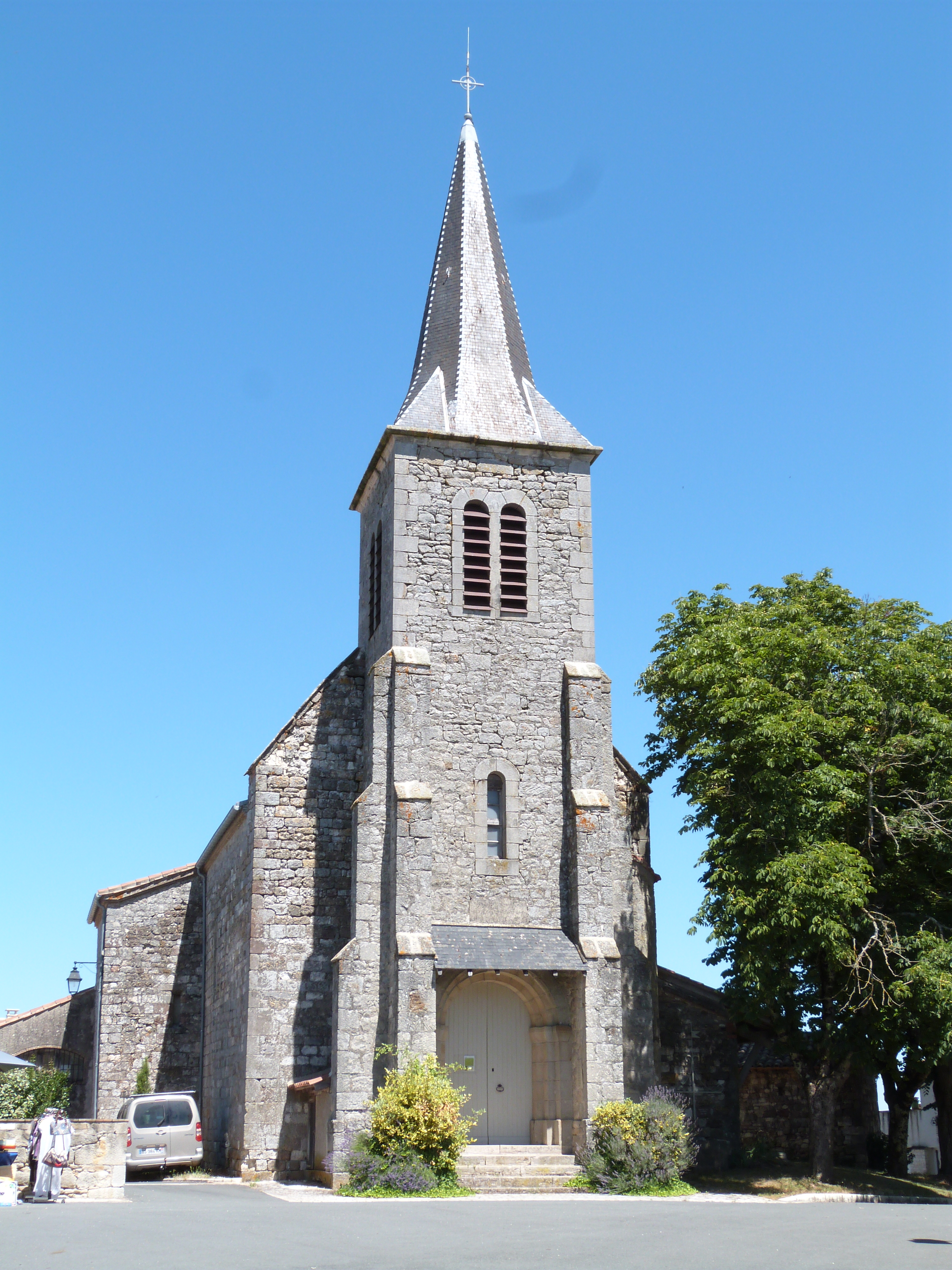
- Church of St. Eusebe

- Coat of arms
- Location of Campagnac
- Location within France Location within Occitanie
- Coordinates: 44°01′54″N 1°50′45″E
- Country: France
- Region: Occitania
- Department: Tarn
- Arrondissement: Albi
- Canton: Vignobles et Bastides
- Intercommunality: CA Gaillac-Graulhet

Government
  - Mayor (2020–2026): Jean-Louis Bouloc
- Area^{1}: 7.43 km^{2} (2.87 sq mi)
- Elevation: 323 m (1,060 ft)
- Highest elevation: 371 m (1,217 ft)
- Lowest elevation: 206 m (676 ft)
- Population (2023): 157
  - Density: 21.1/km^{2} (54.7/sq mi)
- Time zone: UTC+01:00 (CET)
  - Summer (DST): UTC+02:00 (CEST)
- INSEE/Postal code: 81056 /81140
- ^{1} French Land Register data, which excludes lakes, ponds, glaciers > 1 km^{2} (0.386 sq mi or 247 acres) and river estuaries.

Campagnac (French pronunciation: [kɑ̃paɲak]; Occitan: Campanhac) is a commune in the Tarn department in southern France.

== See also ==
- Communes of the Tarn department
