= Saint-Gauzens =

- Commune
- Coat of arms
- Location of Saint-Gauzens
- Location within France Location within Occitanie
- Coordinates: 43°44′56″N 1°54′00″E
- Country: France
- Region: Occitania
- Department: Tarn
- Arrondissement: Castres
- Canton: Graulhet
- Intercommunality: CA Gaillac-Graulhet

Government
  - Mayor (2020–2026): Paul Boulvrais
- Area^{1}: 18.42 km^{2} (7.11 sq mi)
- Elevation: 150 m (490 ft)
- Highest elevation: 284 m (932 ft)
- Lowest elevation: 109 m (358 ft)
- Population (2023): 905
  - Density: 49.1/km^{2} (127/sq mi)
- Time zone: UTC+01:00 (CET)
  - Summer (DST): UTC+02:00 (CEST)
- INSEE/Postal code: 81248 /81.90
- ^{1} French Land Register data, which excludes lakes, ponds, glaciers > 1 km^{2} (0.386 sq mi or 247 acres) and river estuaries.

Saint-Gauzens is a commune in the Tarn department in southern France.

== Geography ==
The commune is traversed by the river Dadou.

== See also ==
- Communes of the Tarn department
