= Peyrole =

- Commune
- Coat of arms
- Location of Peyrole
- Location within France Location within Occitanie
- Coordinates: 43°48′19″N 1°53′57″E
- Country: France
- Region: Occitania
- Department: Tarn
- Arrondissement: Albi
- Canton: Les Deux Rives
- Intercommunality: CA Gaillac-Graulhet
- Area^{1}: 20.59 km^{2} (7.95 sq mi)
- Elevation: 340 m (1,120 ft)
- Highest elevation: 325 m (1,066 ft)
- Lowest elevation: 154 m (505 ft)
- Population (2023): 545
  - Density: 26.5/km^{2} (68.6/sq mi)
- Time zone: UTC+01:00 (CET)
  - Summer (DST): UTC+02:00 (CEST)
- INSEE/Postal code: 81208 /81310
- ^{1} French Land Register data, which excludes lakes, ponds, glaciers > 1 km^{2} (0.386 sq mi or 247 acres) and river estuaries.

Peyrole (French pronunciation: [peʁɔl]; Occitan: Peiròla) is a commune in the Tarn department in southern France.

== See also ==
- Communes of the Tarn department
