= Técou =

- Commune
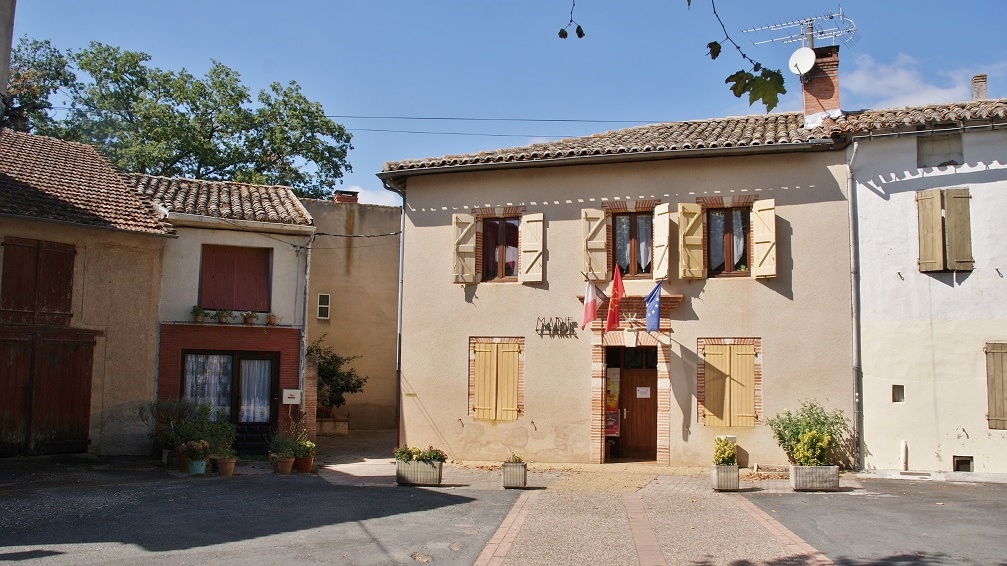
- Town hall

- Coat of arms
- Location of Técou
- Location within France Location within Occitanie
- Coordinates: 43°50′39″N 1°57′02″E
- Country: France
- Region: Occitania
- Department: Tarn
- Arrondissement: Albi
- Canton: Les Deux Rives
- Intercommunality: CA Gaillac-Graulhet

Government
  - Mayor (2020–2026): Jean-François Baulès
- Area^{1}: 19.40 km^{2} (7.49 sq mi)
- Elevation: 240 m (790 ft)
- Highest elevation: 325 m (1,066 ft)
- Lowest elevation: 160 m (520 ft)
- Population (2023): 1,103
  - Density: 56.86/km^{2} (147.3/sq mi)
- Time zone: UTC+01:00 (CET)
  - Summer (DST): UTC+02:00 (CEST)
- INSEE/Postal code: 81294 /81600
- ^{1} French Land Register data, which excludes lakes, ponds, glaciers > 1 km^{2} (0.386 sq mi or 247 acres) and river estuaries.

Técou (French pronunciation: [teku]; Occitan: Tecon, meaning salmon) is a commune in the Tarn department in southern France.

== See also ==
- Communes of the Tarn department
