= Cadalen =

- Commune
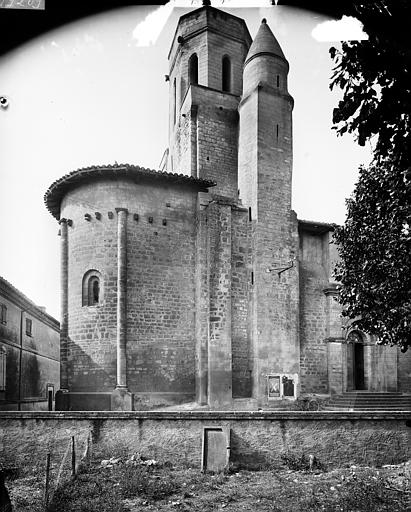
- The church in Cadalen

- Coat of arms
- Location of Cadalen
- Location within France Location within Occitanie
- Coordinates: 43°51′03″N 1°58′57″E
- Country: France
- Region: Occitania
- Department: Tarn
- Arrondissement: Albi
- Canton: Les Deux Rives
- Intercommunality: CA Gaillac-Graulhet

Government
  - Mayor (2020–2026): Sébastien Braylé
- Area^{1}: 40.41 km^{2} (15.60 sq mi)
- Elevation: 199 m (653 ft)
- Highest elevation: 325 m (1,066 ft)
- Lowest elevation: 163 m (535 ft)
- Population (2023): 1,547
  - Density: 38.28/km^{2} (99.15/sq mi)
- Time zone: UTC+01:00 (CET)
  - Summer (DST): UTC+02:00 (CEST)
- INSEE/Postal code: 81046 /81600
- ^{1} French Land Register data, which excludes lakes, ponds, glaciers > 1 km^{2} (0.386 sq mi or 247 acres) and river estuaries.

Cadalen (French pronunciation: [kadalɛ̃]; Occitan: Cadaluènh) is a commune in the Tarn department in southern France.

== See also ==
- Communes of the Tarn department
