= Bernac, Tarn =

Bernac
- Commune
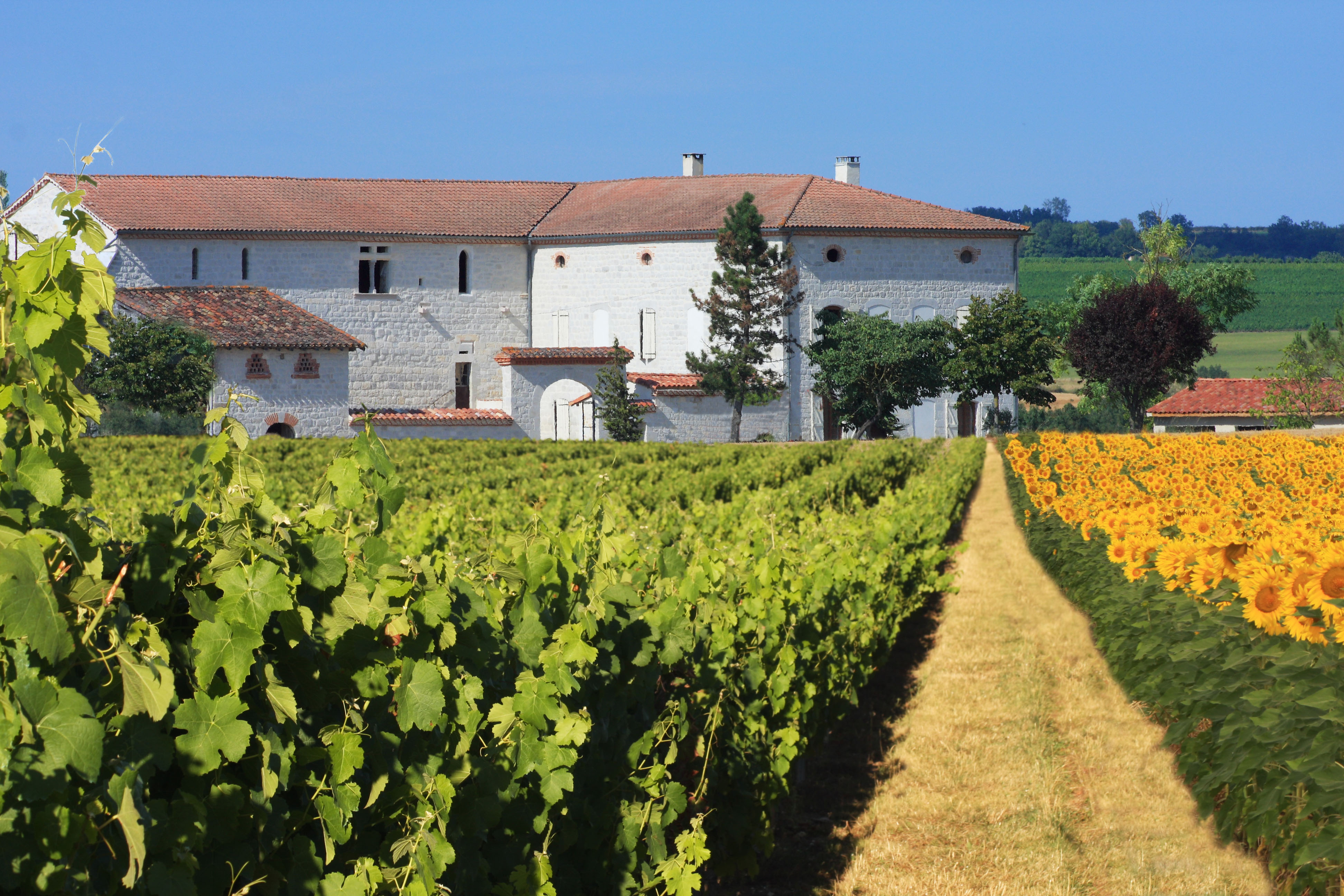
- The Cistercian Grange in Bernac

- Coat of arms
- Location of Bernac
- Location within France Location within Occitanie
- Coordinates: 43°57′33″N 2°01′32″E
- Country: France
- Region: Occitania
- Department: Tarn
- Arrondissement: Albi
- Canton: Les Deux Rives
- Intercommunality: CA Gaillac-Graulhet

Government
  - Mayor (2020–2026): Pascal Hebrard
- Area^{1}: 5.54 km^{2} (2.14 sq mi)
- Highest elevation: 225 m (738 ft)
- Lowest elevation: 174 m (571 ft)
- Population (2023): 186
  - Density: 33.6/km^{2} (87.0/sq mi)
- Time zone: UTC+01:00 (CET)
  - Summer (DST): UTC+02:00 (CEST)
- INSEE/Postal code: 81029 /81150
- ^{1} French Land Register data, which excludes lakes, ponds, glaciers > 1 km^{2} (0.386 sq mi or 247 acres) and river estuaries.

Bernac (French pronunciation: [bɛʁnak]) is a commune in the Tarn département in southern France. It has 189 inhabitants in 2013.

== See also ==
- Communes of the Tarn department
