= Montvalen =

- Commune
- Coat of arms
- Location of Montvalen
- Location within France Location within Occitanie
- Coordinates: 43°51′55″N 1°35′27″E
- Country: France
- Region: Occitania
- Department: Tarn
- Arrondissement: Albi
- Canton: Vignobles et Bastides
- Intercommunality: CA Gaillac-Graulhet

Government
  - Mayor (2020–2026): Elisabeth Loyer
- Area^{1}: 11.73 km^{2} (4.53 sq mi)
- Elevation: 198 m (650 ft)
- Highest elevation: 223 m (732 ft)
- Lowest elevation: 116 m (381 ft)
- Population (2023): 243
  - Density: 20.7/km^{2} (53.7/sq mi)
- Time zone: UTC+01:00 (CET)
  - Summer (DST): UTC+02:00 (CEST)
- INSEE/Postal code: 81185 /81630
- ^{1} French Land Register data, which excludes lakes, ponds, glaciers > 1 km^{2} (0.386 sq mi or 247 acres) and river estuaries.

Montvalen is a commune in the Tarn department in southern France.

== See also ==
- Communes of the Tarn department
