= Mézens =

- Commune
- Coat of arms
- Location of Mézens
- Location within France Location within Occitanie
- Coordinates: 43°47′20″N 1°40′15″E
- Country: France
- Region: Occitania
- Department: Tarn
- Arrondissement: Albi
- Canton: Vignobles et Bastides
- Intercommunality: CA Gaillac-Graulhet

Government
  - Mayor (2020–2026): Jacques Tisserand
- Area^{1}: 5.9 km^{2} (2.3 sq mi)
- Elevation: 120 m (390 ft)
- Highest elevation: 247 m (810 ft)
- Lowest elevation: 97 m (318 ft)
- Population (2023): 536
  - Density: 91/km^{2} (240/sq mi)
- Time zone: UTC+01:00 (CET)
  - Summer (DST): UTC+02:00 (CEST)
- INSEE/Postal code: 81164 /81800
- ^{1} French Land Register data, which excludes lakes, ponds, glaciers > 1 km^{2} (0.386 sq mi or 247 acres) and river estuaries.

Mézens (Languedocien: Mesens) is a commune in the Tarn department in southern France.

== See also ==
- Communes of the Tarn department
