= Saint-Urcisse, Tarn =

Saint-Urcisse
- Commune
- Coat of arms
- Location of Saint-Urcisse
- Location within France Location within Occitanie
- Coordinates: 43°56′26″N 1°36′56″E
- Country: France
- Region: Occitania
- Department: Tarn
- Arrondissement: Albi
- Canton: Vignobles et Bastides
- Intercommunality: CA Gaillac-Graulhet

Government
  - Mayor (2020–2026): Marie-Claire Mate
- Area^{1}: 12.05 km^{2} (4.65 sq mi)
- Elevation: 225 m (738 ft)
- Highest elevation: 226 m (741 ft)
- Lowest elevation: 135 m (443 ft)
- Population (2023): 230
  - Density: 19/km^{2} (49/sq mi)
- Time zone: UTC+01:00 (CET)
  - Summer (DST): UTC+02:00 (CEST)
- INSEE/Postal code: 81272 /81630
- ^{1} French Land Register data, which excludes lakes, ponds, glaciers > 1 km^{2} (0.386 sq mi or 247 acres) and river estuaries.

Saint-Urcisse (French pronunciation: [sɛ̃.t‿yʁsis]; Languedocien: Sent Orsesi) is a commune in the Tarn department in southern France.

== See also ==
- Communes of the Tarn department
