= Grazac, Tarn =

Grazac
- Commune
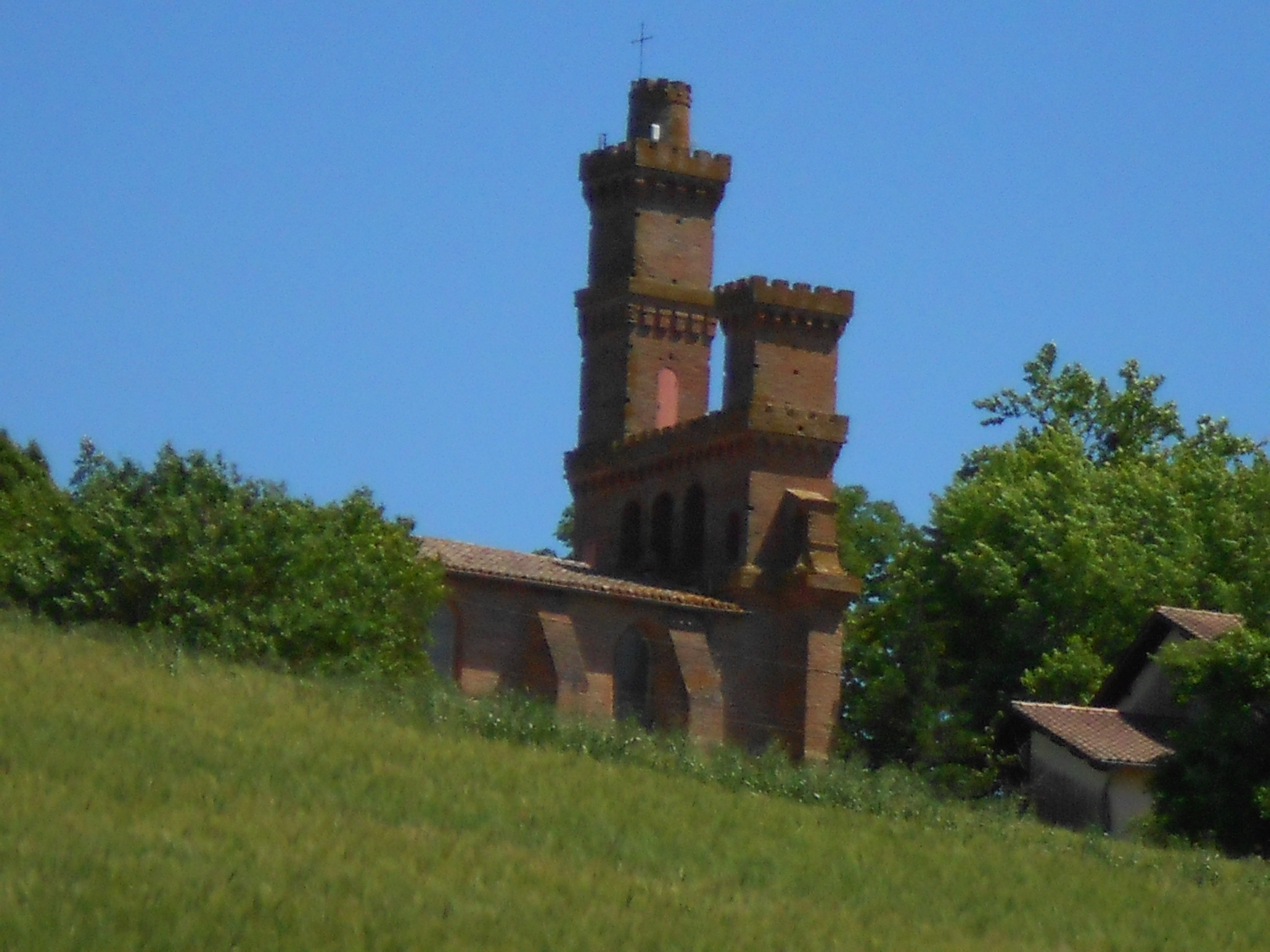
- A view within Grazac

- Coat of arms
- Location of Grazac
- Location within France Location within Occitanie
- Coordinates: 43°50′37″N 1°39′31″E
- Country: France
- Region: Occitania
- Department: Tarn
- Arrondissement: Albi
- Canton: Vignobles et Bastides
- Intercommunality: CA Gaillac-Graulhet

Government
  - Mayor (2020–2026): Christophe Gourmanel
- Area^{1}: 32.02 km^{2} (12.36 sq mi)
- Elevation: 225 m (738 ft)
- Highest elevation: 235 m (771 ft)
- Lowest elevation: 117 m (384 ft)
- Population (2023): 650
  - Density: 20/km^{2} (53/sq mi)
- Time zone: UTC+01:00 (CET)
  - Summer (DST): UTC+02:00 (CEST)
- INSEE/Postal code: 81106 /81800
- ^{1} French Land Register data, which excludes lakes, ponds, glaciers > 1 km^{2} (0.386 sq mi or 247 acres) and river estuaries.

Grazac (French pronunciation: [ɡʁazak]; Occitan: Grasac) is a commune in the Tarn department in southern France.

== See also ==
- Communes of the Tarn department
