= Andillac =

- Commune
- Location of Andillac
- Location within France Location within Occitanie
- Coordinates: 44°00′00″N 1°53′30″E
- Country: France
- Region: Occitania
- Department: Tarn
- Arrondissement: Albi
- Canton: Vignobles et Bastides
- Intercommunality: CA Gaillac-Graulhet

Government
  - Mayor (2020–2026): Jacques Bros
- Area^{1}: 5.44 km^{2} (2.10 sq mi)
- Elevation: 240 m (790 ft)
- Highest elevation: 283 m (928 ft)
- Lowest elevation: 189 m (620 ft)
- Population (2023): 127
  - Density: 23.3/km^{2} (60.5/sq mi)
- Time zone: UTC+01:00 (CET)
  - Summer (DST): UTC+02:00 (CEST)
- INSEE/Postal code: 81012 /81140
- ^{1} French Land Register data, which excludes lakes, ponds, glaciers > 1 km^{2} (0.386 sq mi or 247 acres) and river estuaries.

Andillac (French pronunciation: [ɑ̃dijak]; Occitan: Andilhac) is a commune of the Tarn department in southern France.

== See also ==
- Communes of the Tarn department
