= Montirat =

Montirat may refer to the following places in France:

- Montirat, Aude, a commune in the Aude department
- Montirat, Tarn, a commune in the Tarn department
