= Bournazel =

Bournazel is the name of the following communes in France:

- Bournazel, Aveyron, in the Aveyron department
- Bournazel, Tarn, in the Tarn department

== People with the surname ==
- Pierre-Yves Bournazel (born 1977), French politician
