= Combefa =

- Commune
- Location of Combefa
- Location within France Location within Occitanie
- Coordinates: 44°03′21″N 2°05′49″E
- Country: France
- Region: Occitania
- Department: Tarn
- Arrondissement: Albi
- Canton: Carmaux-2 Vallée du Cérou
- Intercommunality: Carmausin-Ségala

Government
  - Mayor (2020–2026): Jean-Michel Sibra
- Area^{1}: 2.93 km^{2} (1.13 sq mi)
- Elevation: 240 m (790 ft)
- Highest elevation: 330 m (1,080 ft)
- Lowest elevation: 213 m (699 ft)
- Population (2023): 206
  - Density: 70.3/km^{2} (182/sq mi)
- Time zone: UTC+01:00 (CET)
  - Summer (DST): UTC+02:00 (CEST)
- INSEE/Postal code: 81068 /81640
- ^{1} French Land Register data, which excludes lakes, ponds, glaciers > 1 km^{2} (0.386 sq mi or 247 acres) and river estuaries.

Combefa (French pronunciation: [kɔ̃bfa]; Occitan: Combafan) is a commune in the Tarn department in southern France.

It has an old ruined castle, the "Château de Combefa", former summer residence of the bishops of Albi. The chapel of the castle contained a 15th-century sculpture group representing the Entombment of Christ. The sculpture group was moved to the hospital of Monestiés in 1774.

== See also ==
- Communes of the Tarn department
