= Communes of the Tarn department =

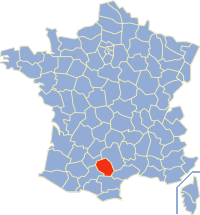

The following is a list of the 314 communes of the Tarn department of France.

The communes cooperate in the following intercommunalities (as of 2025):

- Communauté d'agglomération de l'Albigeois
- Communauté d'agglomération de Castres Mazamet
- Communauté d'agglomération Gaillac-Graulhet
- Communauté de communes Carmausin-Ségala
- Communauté de communes Centre Tarn
- Communauté de communes du Cordais et du Causse
- Communauté de communes du Haut-Languedoc (partly)
- Communauté de communes du Lautrécois-Pays d'Agout
- Communauté de communes des Monts d'Alban et du Villefranchois
- Communauté de communes du Quercy Rouergue et des gorges de l'Aveyron (partly)
- Communauté de communes Sidobre Vals et Plateaux
- Communauté de communes du Sor et de l'Agout
- Communauté de communes aux sources du Canal du Midi (partly)
- Communauté de communes Tarn-Agout (partly)
- Communauté de communes Thoré Montagne Noire
- Communauté de communes Val 81

INSEE code	Postal code	Commune
81001	81470	Aguts
81002	81200	Aiguefonde
81003	81250	Alban
81004	81000	Albi
81005	81240	Albine
81006	81470	Algans
81008	81190	Almayrac
81007	81140	Alos
81009	81170	Amarens
81010	81430	Ambialet
81011	81500	Ambres
81012	81140	Andillac
81013	81350	Andouque
81014	81260	Anglès
81015	81700	Appelle
81016	81110	Arfons
81017	81360	Arifat
81018	81160	Arthès
81019	81340	Assac
81020	81600	Aussac
81021	81200	Aussillon
81022	81500	Bannières
81023	81320	Barre
81024	81630	Beauvais-sur-Tescou
81025	81500	Belcastel
81026	81430	Bellegarde-Marsal
81027	81540	Belleserre
81028	81260	Berlats
81029	81150	Bernac
81030	81700	Bertre
81031	81260	Le Bez
81032	81700	Blan
81033	81400	Blaye-les-Mines
81034	81490	Boissezon
81035	81170	Bournazel
81036	81660	Bout-du-Pont-de-Larn
81037	81260	Brassac
81038	81600	Brens
81039	81390	Briatexte
81040	81440	Brousse
81041	81600	Broze
81042	81100	Burlats
81043	81300	Busque
81044	81500	Cabanès
81045	81170	Les Cabannes
81046	81600	Cadalen
81047	81340	Cadix
81048	81130	Cagnac-les-Mines
81049	81540	Cahuzac
81051	81140	Cahuzac-sur-Vère
81052	81990	Cambon
81050	81470	Cambon-lès-Lavaur
81053	81260	Cambounès
81054	81580	Cambounet-sur-le-Sor
81055	81540	Les Cammazes
81056	81140	Campagnac
81058	81570	Carbes
81059	81990	Carlus
81060	81400	Carmaux
81061	81150	Castanet
81063	81150	Castelnau-de-Lévis
81064	81140	Castelnau-de-Montmiral
81065	81100	Castres
81066	81200	Caucalières
81067	81150	Cestayrols
81068	81640	Combefa
81069	81170	Cordes-sur-Ciel
81070	81800	Coufouleux
81071	81340	Courris
81072	81350	Crespin
81073	81350	Crespinet
81074	81990	Cunac
81075	81570	Cuq
81076	81470	Cuq-Toulza
81077	81250	Curvalle
81078	81220	Damiatte
81079	81120	Dénat
81080	81170	Donnazac
81081	81110	Dourgne
81082	81340	Le Dourn
81083	81540	Durfort
81084	81290	Escoussens
81085	81530	Escroux
81086	81260	Espérausses
81088	81120	Fauch
81089	81340	Faussergues
81087	81150	Fayssac
81090	81600	Fénols
81092	81500	Fiac
81093	81150	Florentin
81062	81260	Fontrieu
81094	81340	Fraissines
81095	81170	Frausseilles
81096	81430	Le Fraysse
81097	81990	Fréjairolles
81098	81570	Fréjeville
81099	81600	Gaillac
81100	81700	Garrevaques
81101	81450	Le Garric
81102	81500	Garrigues
81103	81530	Gijounet
81104	81500	Giroussens
81105	81300	Graulhet
81106	81800	Grazac
81108	81170	Itzac
81109	81440	Jonquières
81110	81190	Jouqueviel
81111	81170	Labarthe-Bleys
81112	81150	Labastide-de-Lévis
81114	81400	Labastide-Gabausse
81115	81270	Labastide-Rouairoux
81116	81500	Labastide-Saint-Georges
81117	81300	Labessière-Candeil
81118	81100	Laboulbène
81119	81120	Laboutarie
81120	81290	Labruguière
81121	81240	Lacabarède
81122	81340	Lacapelle-Pinet
81123	81170	Lacapelle-Ségalar
81124	81230	Lacaune
81125	81330	Lacaze
81126	81500	Lacougotte-Cadoul
81127	81470	Lacroisille
81128	81210	Lacrouzette
81129	81110	Lagardiolle
81130	81090	Lagarrigue
81131	81150	Lagrave
81132	81220	Guitalens-L'Albarède
81133	81120	Lamillarié
81134	81260	Lamontélarié
81135	81640	Laparrouquial
81136	81140	Larroque
81137	81260	Lasfaillades
81138	81300	Lasgraisses
81139	81440	Lautrec
81140	81500	Lavaur
81141	81340	Lédas-et-Penthiès
81142	81700	Lempaut
81143	81110	Lescout
81144	81380	Lescure-d'Albigeois
81145	81310	Lisle-sur-Tarn
81146	81170	Livers-Cazelles
81147	81120	Lombers
81148	81170	Loubers
81149	81800	Loupiac
81150	81500	Lugan
81151	81220	Magrin
81152	81130	Mailhoc
81154	81170	Marnaves
81156	81150	Marssac-sur-Tarn
81157	81500	Marzens
81158	81530	Le Masnau-Massuguiès
81159	81500	Massac-Séran
81160	81110	Massaguel
81161	81250	Massals
81162	81470	Maurens-Scopont
81163	81200	Mazamet
81164	81800	Mézens
81165	81170	Milhars

INSEE code	Postal code	Commune
81166	81130	Milhavet
81167	81250	Miolles
81168	81190	Mirandol-Bourgnounac
81169	81300	Missècle
81170	81640	Monestiés
81171	81600	Montans
81172	81190	Montauriol
81173	81500	Montcabrier
81174	81440	Montdragon
81175	81630	Montdurausse
81176	81140	Montels
81177	81210	Montfa
81178	81630	Montgaillard
81179	81470	Montgey
81180	81190	Montirat
81181	81440	Montpinier
81182	81360	Montredon-Labessonnié
81183	81120	Mont-Roc
81184	81170	Montrosier
81185	81630	Montvalen
81186	81190	Moularès
81187	81300	Moulayrès
81188	81320	Moulin-Mage
81189	81470	Mouzens
81191	81170	Mouzieys-Panens
81190	81430	Mouzieys-Teulet
81192	81320	Murat-sur-Vèbre
81193	81320	Nages
81195	81710	Navès
81196	81490	Noailhac
81197	81170	Noailles
81198	81120	Orban
81199	81340	Padiès
81200	81700	Palleville
81201	81190	Pampelonne
81202	81310	Parisot
81203	81250	Paulinet
81204	81660	Payrin-Augmontel
81205	81470	Péchaudier
81206	81140	Penne
81207	81440	Peyregoux
81208	81310	Peyrole
81209	81660	Pont-de-Larn
81210	81700	Poudis
81211	81120	Poulan-Pouzols
81212	81220	Prades
81213	81500	Pratviel
81214	81470	Puéchoursi
81215	81390	Puybegon
81216	81440	Puycalvel
81217	81140	Puycelsi
81218	81990	Puygouzon
81219	81700	Puylaurens
81220	81800	Rabastens
81221	81330	Rayssac
81222	81120	Réalmont
81223	81240	Le Rialet
81224	81170	Le Riols
81225	81600	Rivières
81227	81210	Roquecourbe
81228	81800	Roquemaure
81229	81470	Roquevidal
81230	81400	Rosières
81231	81240	Rouairoux
81232	81150	Rouffiac
81234	81140	Roussayrolles
81235	81290	Saint-Affrique-les-Montagnes
81236	81500	Saint-Agnan
81237	81110	Saint-Amancet
81238	81240	Saint-Amans-Soult
81239	81240	Saint-Amans-Valtoret
81240	81250	Saint-André
81242	81110	Saint-Avit
81243	81140	Saint-Beauzile
81244	81400	Saint-Benoît-de-Carmaux
81245	81190	Saint-Christophe
81247	81340	Saint-Cirgue
81246	81140	Sainte-Cécile-du-Cayrou
81326	81150	Sainte-Croix
81249	81190	Sainte-Gemme
81248	81390	Saint-Gauzens
81250	81440	Saint-Genest-de-Contest
81251	81700	Saint-Germain-des-Prés
81252	81210	Saint-Germier
81253	81350	Saint-Grégoire
81254	81350	Saint-Jean-de-Marcel
81255	81500	Saint-Jean-de-Rives
81256	81210	Saint-Jean-de-Vals
81257	81160	Saint-Juéry
81258	81440	Saint-Julien-du-Puy
81259	81340	Saint-Julien-Gaulène
81261	81500	Saint-Lieux-lès-Lavaur
81262	81170	Saint-Marcel-Campes
81263	81170	Saint-Martin-Laguépie
81265	81140	Saint-Michel-de-Vax
81264	81340	Saint-Michel-Labadié
81266	81220	Saint-Paul-Cap-de-Joux
81267	81330	Saint-Pierre-de-Trivisy
81268	81530	Saint-Salvi-de-Carcavès
81269	81490	Saint-Salvy-de-la-Balme
81270	81700	Saint-Sernin-lès-Lavaur
81271	81370	Saint-Sulpice-la-Pointe
81272	81630	Saint-Urcisse
81273	81710	Saïx
81274	81990	Saliès
81275	81640	Salles
81276	81630	Salvagnac
81277	81350	Saussenac
81278	81240	Sauveterre
81279	81630	La Sauzière-Saint-Jean
81280	81640	Le Ségur
81281	81570	Sémalens
81282	81530	Senaux
81283	81600	Senouillac
81284	81990	Le Sequestre
81285	81350	Sérénac
81286	81220	Serviès
81287	81120	Sieurac
81288	81540	Sorèze
81289	81580	Soual
81290	81170	Souel
81291	81130	Taïx
81292	81190	Tanus
81293	81630	Tauriac
81294	81600	Técou
81295	81120	Teillet
81233	81120	Terre-de-Bancalié
81297	81150	Terssac
81298	81500	Teulat
81299	81220	Teyssode
81300	81170	Tonnac
81302	81190	Tréban
81303	81340	Trébas
81304	81190	Trévien
81305	81330	Vabre
81306	81350	Valderiès
81307	81090	Valdurenque
81308	81340	Valence-d'Albigeois
81309	81140	Vaour
81310	81500	Veilhes
81311	81440	Vénès
81312	81110	Verdalle
81313	81140	Le Verdier
81314	81530	Viane
81315	81570	Vielmur-sur-Agout
81316	81140	Vieux
81317	81430	Villefranche-d'Albigeois
81318	81500	Villeneuve-lès-Lavaur
81319	81130	Villeneuve-sur-Vère
81320	81170	Vindrac-Alayrac
81321	81240	Le Vintrou
81322	81640	Virac
81323	81220	Viterbe
81324	81500	Viviers-lès-Lavaur
81325	81290	Viviers-lès-Montagnes
