= Roussayrolles =

- Commune
- Coat of arms
- Location of Roussayrolles
- Location within France Location within Occitanie
- Coordinates: 44°06′08″N 1°50′03″E
- Country: France
- Region: Occitania
- Department: Tarn
- Arrondissement: Albi
- Canton: Carmaux-2 Vallée du Cérou
- Intercommunality: CC du Cordais et du Causse

Government
  - Mayor (2020–2026): Laurent Vaurs
- Area^{1}: 5.38 km^{2} (2.08 sq mi)
- Elevation: 410 m (1,350 ft)
- Highest elevation: 497 m (1,631 ft)
- Lowest elevation: 240 m (790 ft)
- Population (2023): 81
  - Density: 15/km^{2} (39/sq mi)
- Time zone: UTC+01:00 (CET)
  - Summer (DST): UTC+02:00 (CEST)
- INSEE/Postal code: 81234 /81140
- ^{1} French Land Register data, which excludes lakes, ponds, glaciers > 1 km^{2} (0.386 sq mi or 247 acres) and river estuaries.

Roussayrolles (French pronunciation: [ʁuseʁɔl]; Occitan: Rossairòlas [rusajˈɾɔlɔs]) is a commune in the Tarn department in southern France.

== See also ==
- Communes of the Tarn department
