= Montrosier =

- Commune
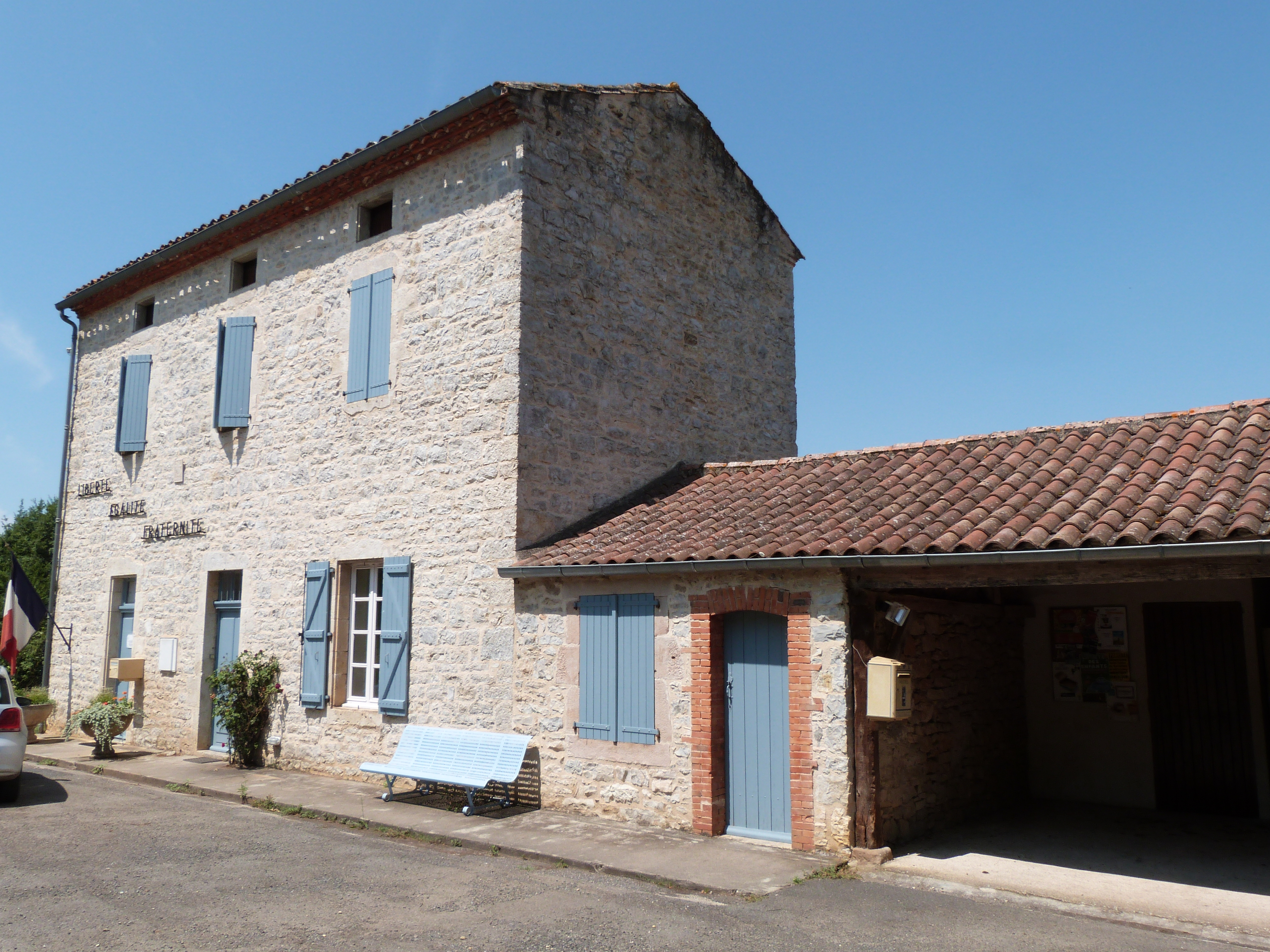
- Montrosier Town hall
- Location of Montrosier
- Location within France Location within Occitanie
- Coordinates: 44°08′20″N 1°50′15″E
- Country: France
- Region: Occitania
- Department: Tarn
- Arrondissement: Albi
- Canton: Carmaux-2 Vallée du Cérou

Government
  - Mayor (2020–2026): Thierry Gautier
- Area^{1}: 3.39 km^{2} (1.31 sq mi)
- Elevation: 137 m (449 ft)
- Highest elevation: 394 m (1,293 ft)
- Lowest elevation: 110 m (360 ft)
- Population (2023): 33
  - Density: 9.7/km^{2} (25/sq mi)
- Time zone: UTC+01:00 (CET)
  - Summer (DST): UTC+02:00 (CEST)
- INSEE/Postal code: 81184 /81170
- ^{1} French Land Register data, which excludes lakes, ponds, glaciers > 1 km^{2} (0.386 sq mi or 247 acres) and river estuaries.

Montrosier is a commune in the Tarn department in southern France.

== See also ==
- Communes of the Tarn department
