= Lacapelle-Ségalar =

- Commune
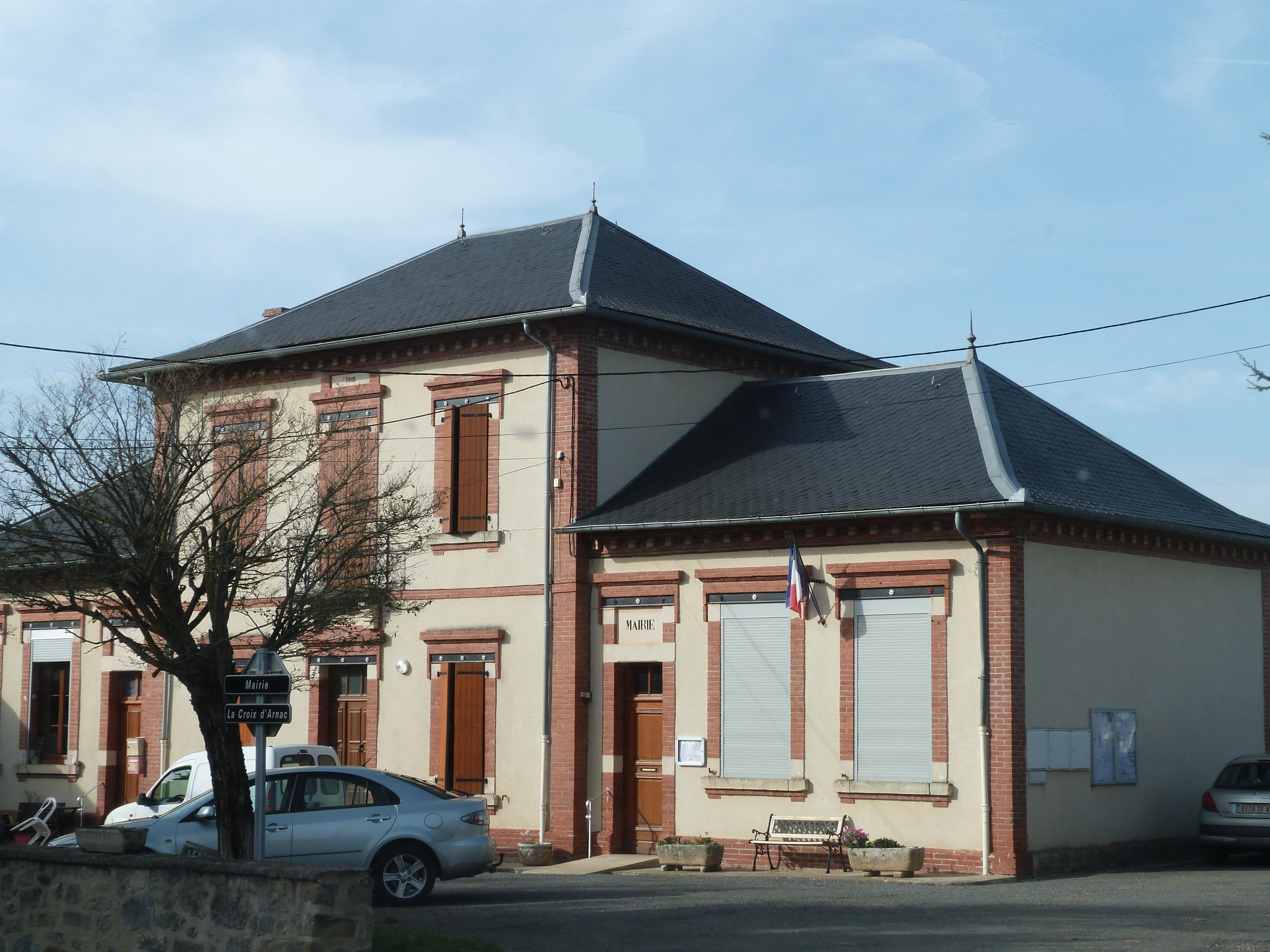
- The mairie in Lacapelle-Ségalar
- Location of Lacapelle-Ségalar
- Location within France Location within Occitanie
- Coordinates: 44°06′59″N 1°59′35″E
- Country: France
- Region: Occitania
- Department: Tarn
- Arrondissement: Albi
- Canton: Carmaux-2 Vallée du Cérou
- Intercommunality: Cordais et Causse

Government
  - Mayor (2020–2026): Frédéric Ichard
- Area^{1}: 6.83 km^{2} (2.64 sq mi)
- Elevation: 289 m (948 ft)
- Highest elevation: 446 m (1,463 ft)
- Lowest elevation: 204 m (669 ft)
- Population (2023): 89
  - Density: 13/km^{2} (34/sq mi)
- Time zone: UTC+01:00 (CET)
  - Summer (DST): UTC+02:00 (CEST)
- INSEE/Postal code: 81123 /81170
- ^{1} French Land Register data, which excludes lakes, ponds, glaciers > 1 km^{2} (0.386 sq mi or 247 acres) and river estuaries.

Lacapelle-Ségalar is a commune in the Tarn department and Occitanie region of southern France.

== See also ==
- Communes of the Tarn department
