= Arrondissement of Albi =

Coordinates: 43°56′N 2°08′E

Albi
- Arrondissement
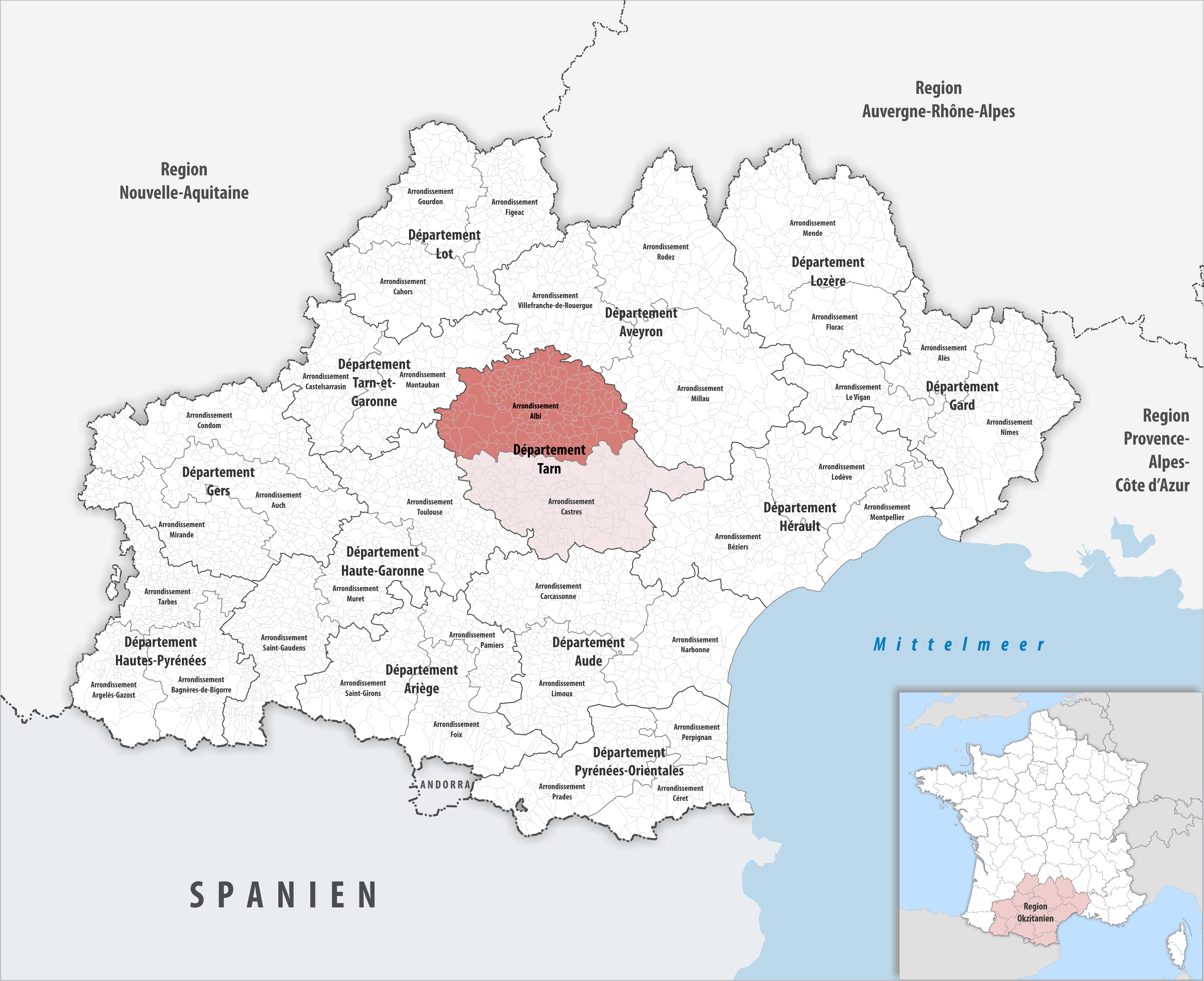
- Location within the region Occitanie
- Country: France
- Region: Occitania
- Department: Tarn
- No. of communes: {{{nbcomm}}}
- Area: 2,731.7 km^{2} (1,054.7 sq mi)
- Population (2023): 198,659
  - Density: 72.724/km^{2} (188.35/sq mi)
- INSEE code: 811

The arrondissement of Albi is an arrondissement of France in the Tarn department in the Occitanie region. Its INSEE code is 811 and its capital city is Albi. It has 163 communes. Its population is 195,484 (2021), and its area is 2,731.7 km^{2} (1,054.7 sq mi). It is the northernmost of the arrondissements of the department.

The main cities, with more than 5,000 inhabitants in 2012, in the arrondissement are Albi (49,231 inhabitants), Gaillac (13,820 inhabitants), Carmaux (9,774 inhabitants), Saint-Juéry (6,715 inhabitants) and Rabastens (5,187 inhabitants).

== Geography ==
The arrondissement of Albi is bordered to the north by the Tarn-et-Garonne (Occitanie) department, to the west by the Aveyron (Occitanie) department, to the south by the arrondissement of Castres and to the south by the Haute-Garonne (Occitanie) department.

== Composition ==
The communes of the arrondissement of Albi, and their INSEE codes, are:

1. Alban (81003)
2. Albi (81004)
3. Almayrac (81008)
4. Alos (81007)
5. Amarens (81009)
6. Ambialet (81010)
7. Andillac (81012)
8. Andouque (81013)
9. Arthès (81018)
10. Assac (81019)
11. Aussac (81020)
12. Beauvais-sur-Tescou (81024)
13. Bellegarde-Marsal (81026)
14. Bernac (81029)
15. Blaye-les-Mines (81033)
16. Bournazel (81035)
17. Brens (81038)
18. Broze (81041)
19. Les Cabannes (81045)
20. Cadalen (81046)
21. Cadix (81047)
22. Cagnac-les-Mines (81048)
23. Cahuzac-sur-Vère (81051)
24. Cambon (81052)
25. Campagnac (81056)
26. Carlus (81059)
27. Carmaux (81060)
28. Castanet (81061)
29. Castelnau-de-Lévis (81063)
30. Castelnau-de-Montmiral (81064)
31. Cestayrols (81067)
32. Combefa (81068)
33. Cordes-sur-Ciel (81069)
34. Coufouleux (81070)
35. Courris (81071)
36. Crespin (81072)
37. Crespinet (81073)
38. Cunac (81074)
39. Curvalle (81077)
40. Dénat (81079)
41. Donnazac (81080)
42. Le Dourn (81082)
43. Fauch (81088)
44. Faussergues (81089)
45. Fayssac (81087)
46. Fénols (81090)
47. Florentin (81093)
48. Fraissines (81094)
49. Frausseilles (81095)
50. Le Fraysse (81096)
51. Fréjairolles (81097)
52. Gaillac (81099)
53. Le Garric (81101)
54. Grazac (81106)
55. Itzac (81108)
56. Jouqueviel (81110)
57. Labarthe-Bleys (81111)
58. Labastide-de-Lévis (81112)
59. Labastide-Gabausse (81114)
60. Labessière-Candeil (81117)
61. Laboutarie (81119)
62. Lacapelle-Pinet (81122)
63. Lacapelle-Ségalar (81123)
64. Lagrave (81131)
65. Lamillarié (81133)
66. Laparrouquial (81135)
67. Larroque (81136)
68. Lasgraisses (81138)
69. Lédas-et-Penthiès (81141)
70. Lescure-d'Albigeois (81144)
71. Lisle-sur-Tarn (81145)
72. Livers-Cazelles (81146)
73. Lombers (81147)
74. Loubers (81148)
75. Loupiac (81149)
76. Mailhoc (81152)
77. Marnaves (81154)
78. Marssac-sur-Tarn (81156)
79. Massals (81161)
80. Mézens (81164)
81. Milhars (81165)
82. Milhavet (81166)
83. Miolles (81167)
84. Mirandol-Bourgnounac (81168)
85. Monestiés (81170)
86. Montans (81171)
87. Montauriol (81172)
88. Montdurausse (81175)
89. Montels (81176)
90. Montgaillard (81178)
91. Montirat (81180)
92. Montrosier (81184)
93. Montvalen (81185)
94. Moularès (81186)
95. Mouzieys-Panens (81191)
96. Mouzieys-Teulet (81190)
97. Noailles (81197)
98. Orban (81198)
99. Padiès (81199)
100. Pampelonne (81201)
101. Parisot (81202)
102. Paulinet (81203)
103. Penne (81206)
104. Peyrole (81208)
105. Poulan-Pouzols (81211)
106. Puycelsi (81217)
107. Puygouzon (81218)
108. Rabastens (81220)
109. Réalmont (81222)
110. Le Riols (81224)
111. Rivières (81225)
112. Roquemaure (81228)
113. Rosières (81230)
114. Rouffiac (81232)
115. Roussayrolles (81234)
116. Saint-André (81240)
117. Saint-Beauzile (81243)
118. Saint-Benoît-de-Carmaux (81244)
119. Saint-Christophe (81245)
120. Saint-Cirgue (81247)
121. Sainte-Cécile-du-Cayrou (81246)
122. Sainte-Croix (81326)
123. Sainte-Gemme (81249)
124. Saint-Grégoire (81253)
125. Saint-Jean-de-Marcel (81254)
126. Saint-Juéry (81257)
127. Saint-Julien-Gaulène (81259)
128. Saint-Marcel-Campes (81262)
129. Saint-Martin-Laguépie (81263)
130. Saint-Michel-de-Vax (81265)
131. Saint-Michel-Labadié (81264)
132. Saint-Urcisse (81272)
133. Saliès (81274)
134. Salles (81275)
135. Salvagnac (81276)
136. Saussenac (81277)
137. La Sauzière-Saint-Jean (81279)
138. Le Ségur (81280)
139. Senouillac (81283)
140. Le Sequestre (81284)
141. Sérénac (81285)
142. Sieurac (81287)
143. Souel (81290)
144. Taïx (81291)
145. Tanus (81292)
146. Tauriac (81293)
147. Técou (81294)
148. Teillet (81295)
149. Terre-de-Bancalié (81233)
150. Terssac (81297)
151. Tonnac (81300)
152. Tréban (81302)
153. Trébas (81303)
154. Trévien (81304)
155. Valderiès (81306)
156. Valence-d'Albigeois (81308)
157. Vaour (81309)
158. Le Verdier (81313)
159. Vieux (81316)
160. Villefranche-d'Albigeois (81317)
161. Villeneuve-sur-Vère (81319)
162. Vindrac-Alayrac (81320)
163. Virac (81322)

== History ==
The arrondissement of Albi was created in 1800.

As a result of the reorganisation of the cantons of France which came into effect in 2015, the borders of the cantons are no longer related to the borders of the arrondissements. The cantons of the arrondissement of Albi were, as of January 2015:

1. Alban
2. Albi-Centre
3. Albi-Est
4. Albi-Nord-Est
5. Albi-Nord-Ouest
6. Albi-Ouest
7. Albi-Sud
8. Cadalen
9. Carmaux-Nord
10. Carmaux-Sud
11. Castelnau-de-Montmiral
12. Cordes-sur-Ciel
13. Gaillac
14. Lisle-sur-Tarn
15. Monestiés
16. Pampelonne
17. Rabastens
18. Réalmont
19. Salvagnac
20. Valderiès
21. Valence-d'Albigeois
22. Vaour
23. Villefranche-d'Albigeois
