= Loubers =

- Commune
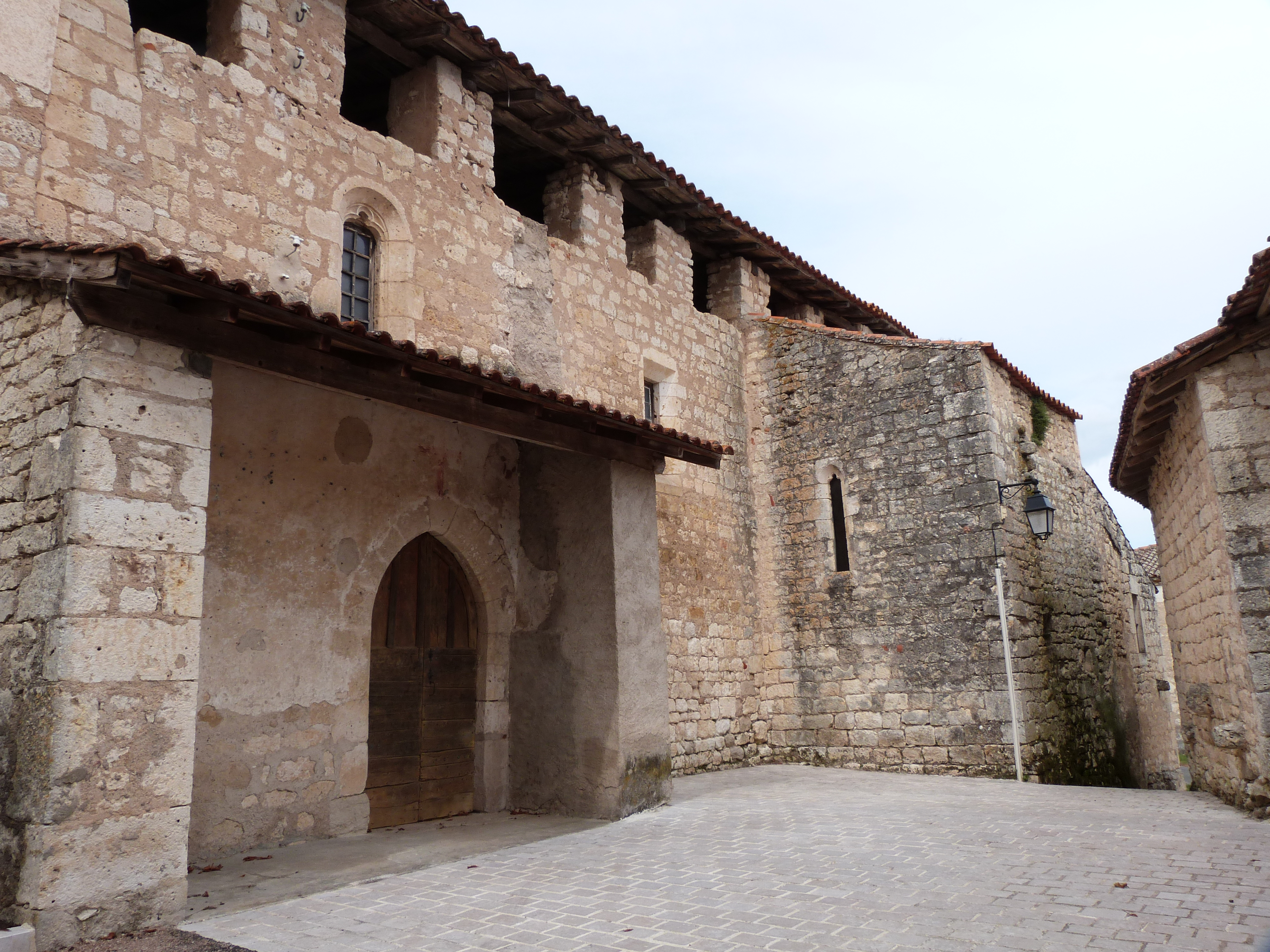
- The entrance to the church in Loubers
- Location of Loubers
- Location within France Location within Occitanie
- Coordinates: 44°02′37″N 1°53′43″E
- Country: France
- Region: Occitania
- Department: Tarn
- Arrondissement: Albi
- Canton: Carmaux-2 Vallée du Cérou

Government
  - Mayor (2020–2026): Claude Geniey
- Area^{1}: 4.23 km^{2} (1.63 sq mi)
- Elevation: 285 m (935 ft)
- Highest elevation: 294 m (965 ft)
- Lowest elevation: 184 m (604 ft)
- Population (2023): 95
  - Density: 22/km^{2} (58/sq mi)
- Time zone: UTC+01:00 (CET)
  - Summer (DST): UTC+02:00 (CEST)
- INSEE/Postal code: 81148 /81170
- ^{1} French Land Register data, which excludes lakes, ponds, glaciers > 1 km^{2} (0.386 sq mi or 247 acres) and river estuaries.

Loubers is a commune in the Tarn department and Occitanie region of southern France.

== See also ==
- Communes of the Tarn department
