= Virac, Tarn =

Virac
- Commune
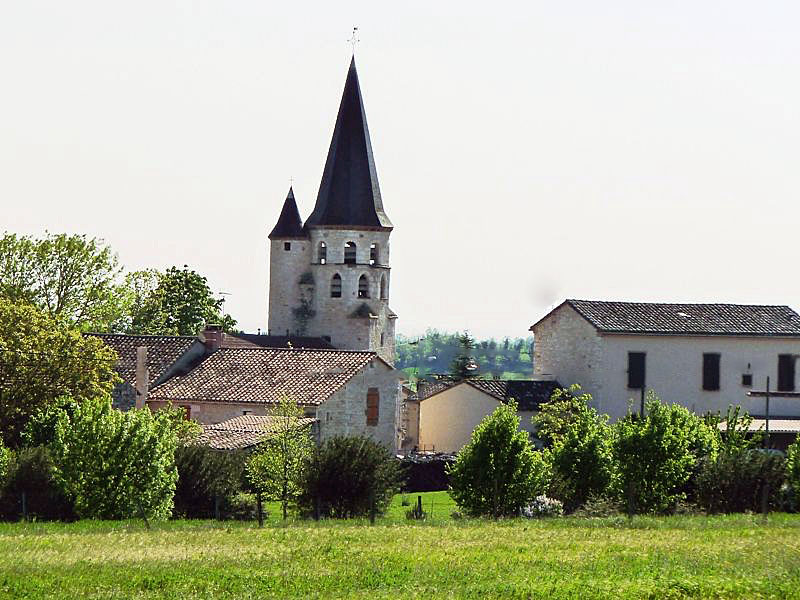
- White church bell tower topped with a slate spire, round turret attached.

- Coat of arms
- Location of Virac
- Location within France Location within Occitanie
- Coordinates: 44°02′51″N 2°02′44″E
- Country: France
- Region: Occitania
- Department: Tarn
- Arrondissement: Albi
- Canton: Carmaux-2 Vallée du Cérou

Government
  - Mayor (2020–2026): Aline Redo
- Area^{1}: 11.44 km^{2} (4.42 sq mi)
- Elevation: 320 m (1,050 ft)
- Highest elevation: 340 m (1,120 ft)
- Lowest elevation: 200 m (660 ft)
- Population (2023): 252
  - Density: 22.0/km^{2} (57.1/sq mi)
- Time zone: UTC+01:00 (CET)
  - Summer (DST): UTC+02:00 (CEST)
- INSEE/Postal code: 81322 /81640
- ^{1} French Land Register data, which excludes lakes, ponds, glaciers > 1 km^{2} (0.386 sq mi or 247 acres) and river estuaries.

Virac (French pronunciation: [viʁak]) is a commune in the Tarn department and Occitanie region of southern France.

== Etymology ==
The old forms are Viragio, towards 1100, Virag, in 1135, and according to Negre, Virac comes from the Latin name of man Virius with the suffix -acu-, Latinization of the Welsh suffix -āco(n). Virac was therefore perhaps an old great ancient property that had for teacher Virius. The choice of Black supposes the absorption of the second -i- by -r-. Always with -acum, Dauzat and Rostaing consider that the name of person is a Welsh name of man, *Viros, choice that is not far from that of Xavier Delamarre, Vīrios (from the adjective vīro-, "fair, true", different from viro-, "man"); for Delamarre, the name of origin would be Uīriācon (this also supposes the later absorption of the second -i-, a phenomenon that, always for Delamarre, does not seem automatic: the same etime leads according to him to Viriat and Virieu, Arpitan places).

== See also ==
- Communes of the Tarn department
