= Le Fraysse =

- Commune
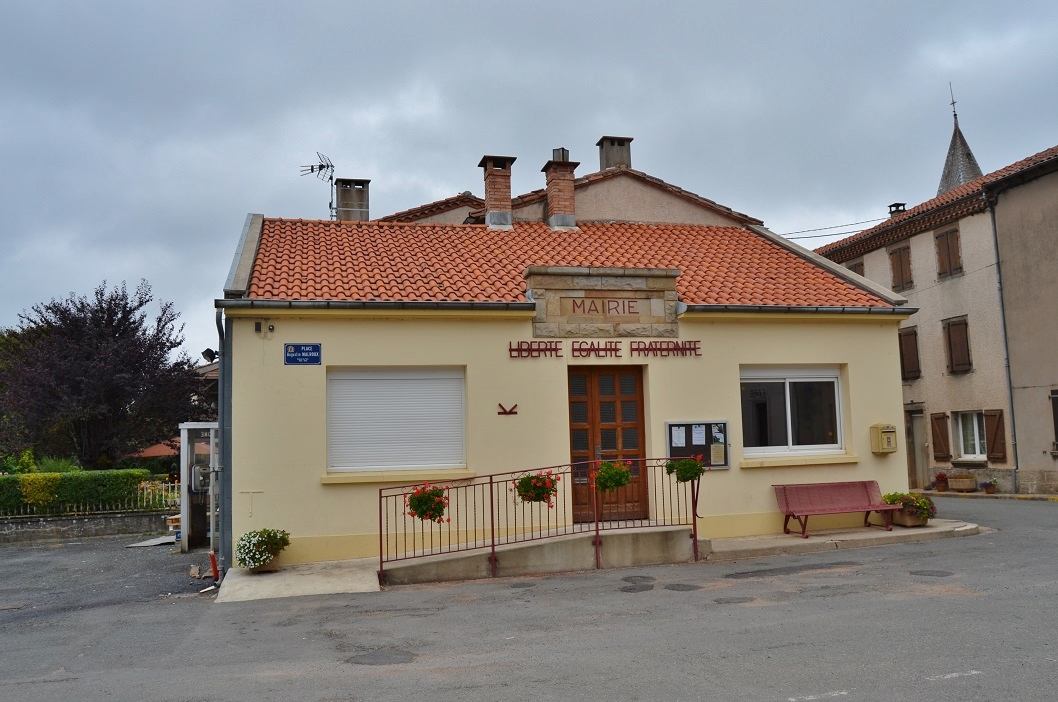
- Le Fraysse Town hall

- Coat of arms
- Location of Le Fraysse
- Location within France Location within Occitanie
- Coordinates: 43°53′55″N 2°25′17″E
- Country: France
- Region: Occitania
- Department: Tarn
- Arrondissement: Albi
- Canton: Le Haut Dadou
- Intercommunality: CC Monts d'Alban et Villefranchois

Government
  - Mayor (2020–2026): Jean-Louis Puech
- Area^{1}: 29.63 km^{2} (11.44 sq mi)
- Elevation: 550 m (1,800 ft)
- Highest elevation: 631 m (2,070 ft)
- Lowest elevation: 239 m (784 ft)
- Population (2023): 421
  - Density: 14.2/km^{2} (36.8/sq mi)
- Time zone: UTC+01:00 (CET)
  - Summer (DST): UTC+02:00 (CEST)
- INSEE/Postal code: 81096 /81430
- ^{1} French Land Register data, which excludes lakes, ponds, glaciers > 1 km^{2} (0.386 sq mi or 247 acres) and river estuaries.

Le Fraysse (French pronunciation: [lə fʁɛs]; Occitan: Lo Fraisse, meaning the ash tree) is a commune in the Tarn department in southern France.

== See also ==
- Communes of the Tarn department
