= Saint-Christophe, Tarn =

Saint-Christophe
- Commune
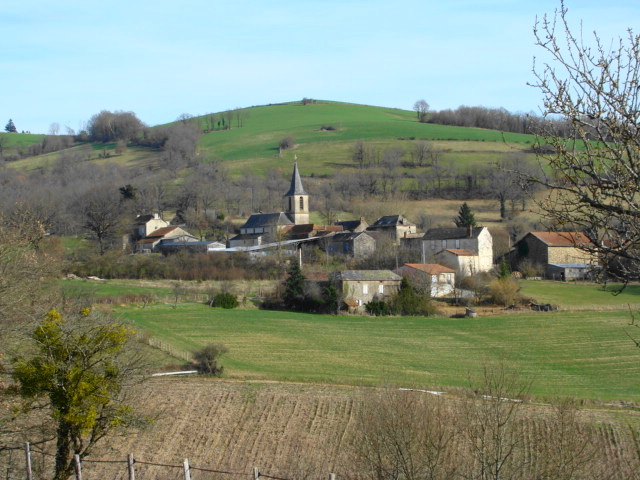
- The church and surrounding buildings in Saint-Christophe
- Location of Saint-Christophe
- Location within France Location within Occitanie
- Coordinates: 44°09′09″N 2°02′56″E
- Country: France
- Region: Occitania
- Department: Tarn
- Arrondissement: Albi
- Canton: Carmaux-2 Vallée du Cérou
- Intercommunality: Carmausin-Ségala

Government
  - Mayor (2020–2026): Thierry Maliet
- Area^{1}: 14.47 km^{2} (5.59 sq mi)
- Elevation: 400 m (1,300 ft)
- Highest elevation: 484 m (1,588 ft)
- Lowest elevation: 156 m (512 ft)
- Population (2023): 137
  - Density: 9.47/km^{2} (24.5/sq mi)
- Time zone: UTC+01:00 (CET)
  - Summer (DST): UTC+02:00 (CEST)
- INSEE/Postal code: 81245 /81190
- ^{1} French Land Register data, which excludes lakes, ponds, glaciers > 1 km^{2} (0.386 sq mi or 247 acres) and river estuaries.

Saint-Christophe (French pronunciation: [sɛ̃ kʁistɔf]; Languedocien: Sant Cristòfol) is a commune in the Tarn department in southern France. In 1973 it absorbed the former commune Narthoux.

== See also ==
- Communes of the Tarn department
