= Livers-Cazelles =

- Commune
- Location of Livers-Cazelles
- Location within France Location within Occitanie
- Coordinates: 44°03′11″N 1°59′56″E
- Country: France
- Region: Occitania
- Department: Tarn
- Arrondissement: Albi
- Canton: Carmaux-2 Vallée du Cérou

Government
  - Mayor (2020–2026): Bernard Bouvier
- Area^{1}: 13.05 km^{2} (5.04 sq mi)
- Elevation: 315 m (1,033 ft)
- Highest elevation: 325 m (1,066 ft)
- Lowest elevation: 191 m (627 ft)
- Population (2023): 239
  - Density: 18.3/km^{2} (47.4/sq mi)
- Time zone: UTC+01:00 (CET)
  - Summer (DST): UTC+02:00 (CEST)
- INSEE/Postal code: 81146 /81170
- ^{1} French Land Register data, which excludes lakes, ponds, glaciers > 1 km^{2} (0.386 sq mi or 247 acres) and river estuaries.

Livers-Cazelles is a commune in the Tarn department in southern France.

== See also ==
- Communes of the Tarn department
