= Fauch =

- Commune
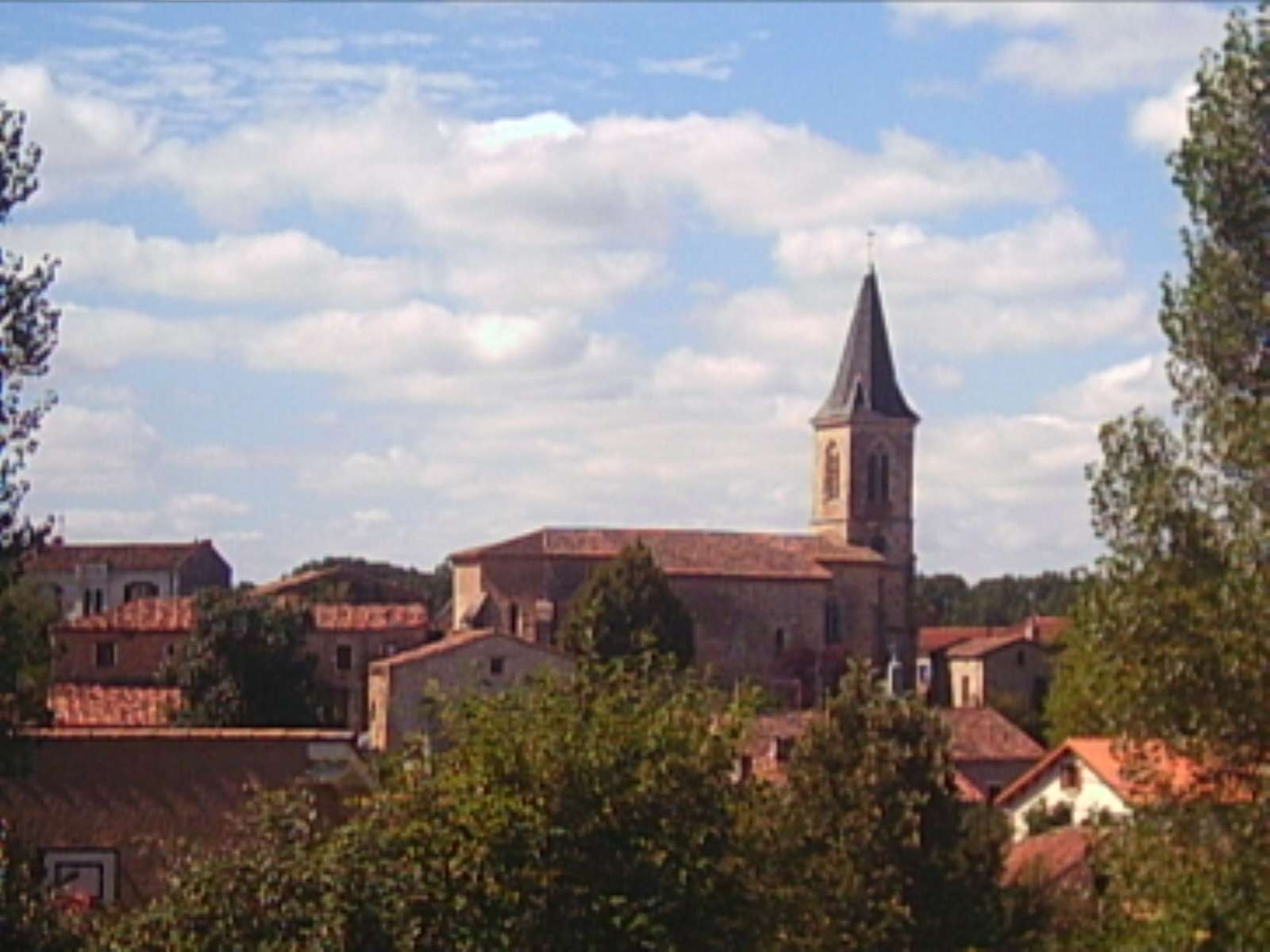
- The church and surroundings in Fauch

- Coat of arms
- Location of Fauch
- Location within France Location within Occitanie
- Coordinates: 43°49′58″N 2°15′16″E
- Country: France
- Region: Occitania
- Department: Tarn
- Arrondissement: Albi
- Canton: Le Haut Dadou

Government
  - Mayor (2020–2026): Robert Roumegoux
- Area^{1}: 17.32 km^{2} (6.69 sq mi)
- Elevation: 330 m (1,080 ft)
- Highest elevation: 391 m (1,283 ft)
- Lowest elevation: 236 m (774 ft)
- Population (2023): 619
  - Density: 35.7/km^{2} (92.6/sq mi)
- Time zone: UTC+01:00 (CET)
  - Summer (DST): UTC+02:00 (CEST)
- INSEE/Postal code: 81088 /81120
- ^{1} French Land Register data, which excludes lakes, ponds, glaciers > 1 km^{2} (0.386 sq mi or 247 acres) and river estuaries.

Fauch is a commune in the Tarn department in southern France.

== See also ==
- Communes of the Tarn department
