= Saint-Martin-Laguépie =

- Commune
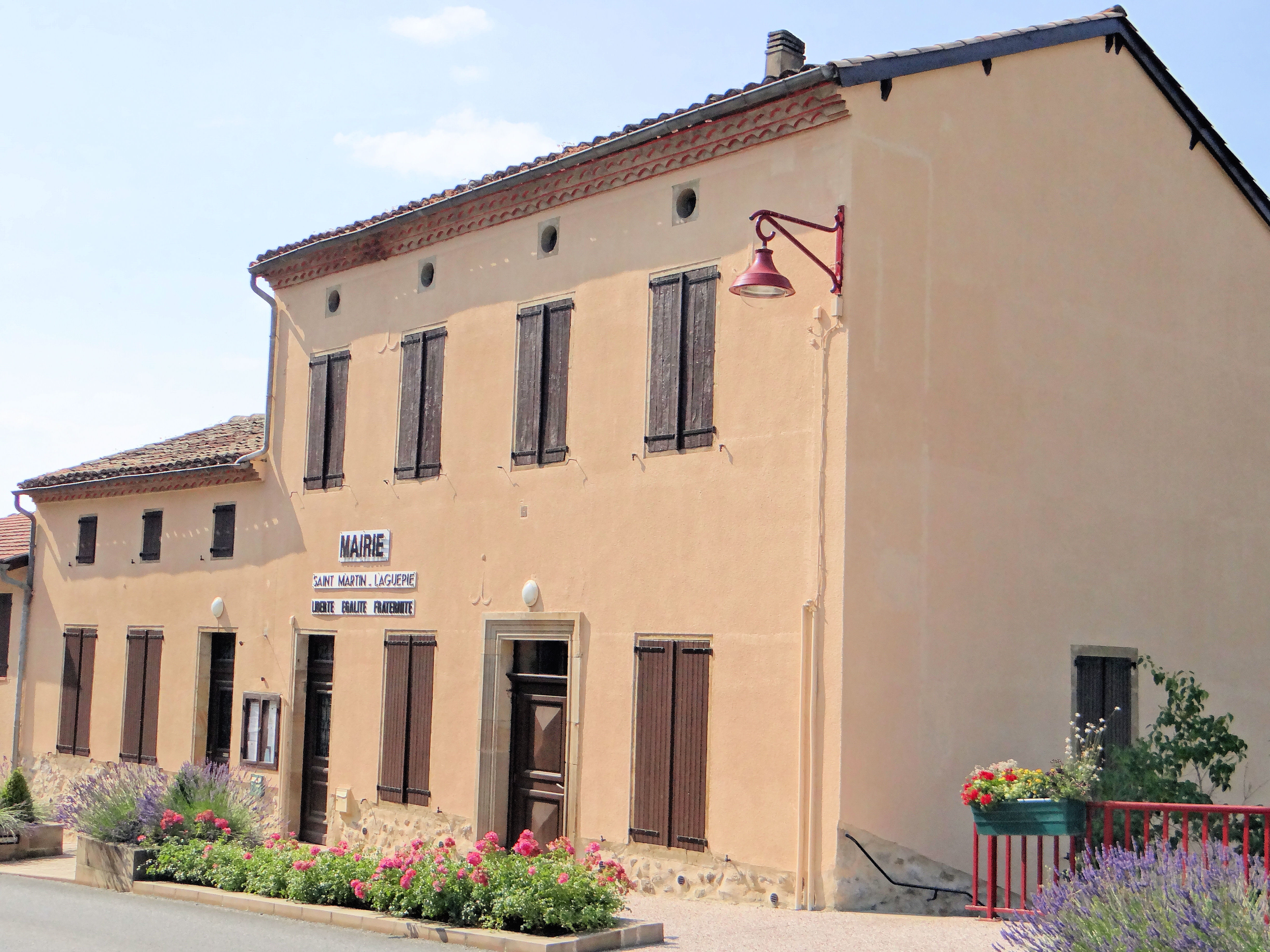
- The town hall in Saint-Martin-Laguépie

- Coat of arms
- Location of Saint-Martin-Laguépie
- Location within France Location within Occitanie
- Coordinates: 44°08′35″N 1°58′28″E
- Country: France
- Region: Occitania
- Department: Tarn
- Arrondissement: Albi
- Canton: Carmaux-2 Vallée du Cérou

Government
  - Mayor (2020–2026): Jean-Christophe Cayre
- Area^{1}: 21.51 km^{2} (8.31 sq mi)
- Elevation: 180 m (590 ft)
- Highest elevation: 344 m (1,129 ft)
- Lowest elevation: 133 m (436 ft)
- Population (2023): 400
  - Density: 19/km^{2} (48/sq mi)
- Time zone: UTC+01:00 (CET)
  - Summer (DST): UTC+02:00 (CEST)
- INSEE/Postal code: 81263 /81170
- ^{1} French Land Register data, which excludes lakes, ponds, glaciers > 1 km^{2} (0.386 sq mi or 247 acres) and river estuaries.

Saint-Martin-Laguépie (French pronunciation: [sɛ̃ maʁtɛ̃ laɡepi]; Languedocien: Sent Martin de la Guépia) is a commune in the Tarn department in southern France.

== See also ==
- Communes of the Tarn department
