= Courris =

- Commune
- Coat of arms
- Location of Courris
- Location within France Location within Occitanie
- Coordinates: 43°57′32″N 2°24′29″E
- Country: France
- Region: Occitania
- Department: Tarn
- Arrondissement: Albi
- Canton: Carmaux-1 Le Ségala
- Intercommunality: Val 81

Government
  - Mayor (2020–2026): Nicole Baysse
- Area^{1}: 9.42 km^{2} (3.64 sq mi)
- Elevation: 231 m (758 ft)
- Highest elevation: 458 m (1,503 ft)
- Lowest elevation: 183 m (600 ft)
- Population (2023): 80
  - Density: 8.5/km^{2} (22/sq mi)
- Time zone: UTC+01:00 (CET)
  - Summer (DST): UTC+02:00 (CEST)
- INSEE/Postal code: 81071 /81340
- ^{1} French Land Register data, which excludes lakes, ponds, glaciers > 1 km^{2} (0.386 sq mi or 247 acres) and river estuaries.

Courris is a commune in the Tarn department in southern France.

== See also ==
- Communes of the Tarn department
