= Miolles =

- Commune
- Coat of arms
- Location of Miolles
- Location within France Location within Occitanie
- Coordinates: 43°53′22″N 2°32′52″E
- Country: France
- Region: Occitania
- Department: Tarn
- Arrondissement: Albi
- Canton: Le Haut Dadou
- Intercommunality: CC Monts d'Alban et Villefranchois

Government
  - Mayor (2020–2026): Thierry Vieules
- Area^{1}: 12.1 km^{2} (4.7 sq mi)
- Elevation: 530 m (1,740 ft)
- Highest elevation: 821 m (2,694 ft)
- Lowest elevation: 310 m (1,020 ft)
- Population (2023): 108
  - Density: 8.93/km^{2} (23.1/sq mi)
- Time zone: UTC+01:00 (CET)
  - Summer (DST): UTC+02:00 (CEST)
- INSEE/Postal code: 81167 /81250
- ^{1} French Land Register data, which excludes lakes, ponds, glaciers > 1 km^{2} (0.386 sq mi or 247 acres) and river estuaries.

Miolles (French pronunciation: [mjɔl]; Occitan: Muòlas) is a commune in the Tarn department in southern France.

== See also ==
- Communes of the Tarn department
