= Trévien =

- Commune
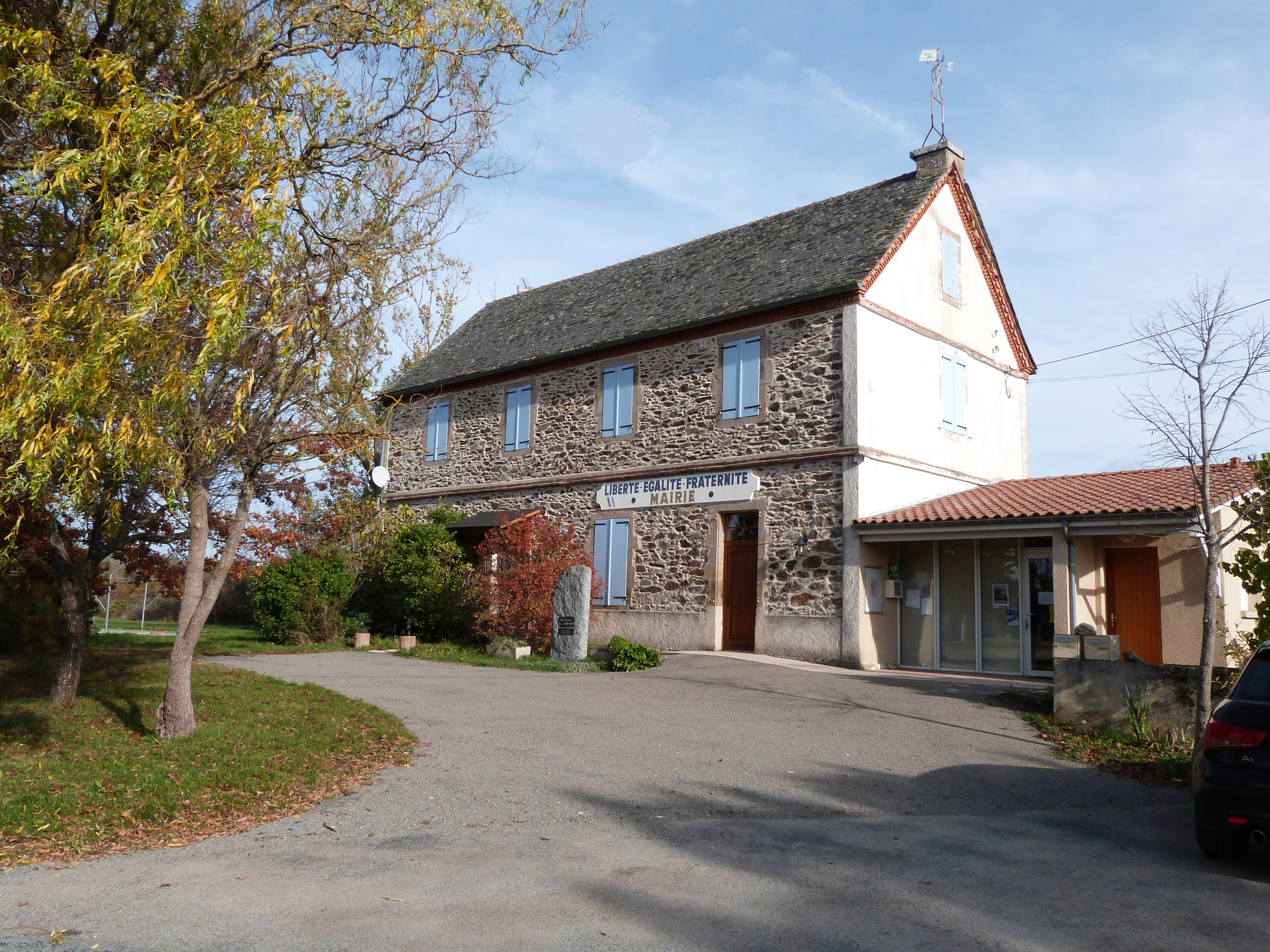
- The town hall in Trévien
- Location of Trévien
- Location within France Location within Occitanie
- Coordinates: 44°06′41″N 2°07′28″E
- Country: France
- Region: Occitania
- Department: Tarn
- Arrondissement: Albi
- Canton: Carmaux-2 Vallée du Cérou
- Intercommunality: Carmausin-Ségala

Government
  - Mayor (2020–2026): Fabienne Bex
- Area^{1}: 16.26 km^{2} (6.28 sq mi)
- Elevation: 310 m (1,020 ft)
- Highest elevation: 466 m (1,529 ft)
- Lowest elevation: 219 m (719 ft)
- Population (2023): 202
  - Density: 12.4/km^{2} (32.2/sq mi)
- Time zone: UTC+01:00 (CET)
  - Summer (DST): UTC+02:00 (CEST)
- INSEE/Postal code: 81304 /81190
- ^{1} French Land Register data, which excludes lakes, ponds, glaciers > 1 km^{2} (0.386 sq mi or 247 acres) and river estuaries.

Trévien (French pronunciation: [tʁevjɛ̃]; Occitan: Trevièn) is a commune in the Tarn department in southern France.

== See also ==
- Communes of the Tarn department
