= Saint-Michel-de-Vax =

- Commune
- Location of Saint-Michel-de-Vax
- Location within France Location within Occitanie
- Coordinates: 44°06′28″N 1°47′59″E
- Country: France
- Region: Occitania
- Department: Tarn
- Arrondissement: Albi
- Canton: Carmaux-2 Vallée du Cérou
- Intercommunality: CC du Cordais et du Causse

Government
  - Mayor (2020–2026): Emma Delpeyrou
- Area^{1}: 5.9 km^{2} (2.3 sq mi)
- Elevation: 400 m (1,300 ft)
- Highest elevation: 413 m (1,355 ft)
- Lowest elevation: 158 m (518 ft)
- Population (2023): 79
  - Density: 13/km^{2} (35/sq mi)
- Time zone: UTC+01:00 (CET)
  - Summer (DST): UTC+02:00 (CEST)
- INSEE/Postal code: 81265 /81140
- ^{1} French Land Register data, which excludes lakes, ponds, glaciers > 1 km^{2} (0.386 sq mi or 247 acres) and river estuaries.

Saint-Michel-de-Vax is a rural commune and hamlet in the Tarn department in southern France.

The hamlet is located on a largely wooded Causse just east of the road between the small towns of Saint-Antonin-Noble-Val and Cordes. The hamlet has no local amenities and consists of about 30 houses, a church and a partially ruined chateau.

== See also ==
- Communes of the Tarn department
