= Labastide-Gabausse =

- Commune
- Coat of arms
- Location of Labastide-Gabausse
- Location within France Location within Occitanie
- Coordinates: 44°02′22″N 2°05′50″E
- Country: France
- Region: Occitania
- Department: Tarn
- Arrondissement: Albi
- Canton: Carmaux-2 Vallée du Cérou
- Intercommunality: Carmausin-Ségala

Government
  - Mayor (2020–2026): Rolland Mercier
- Area^{1}: 12.18 km^{2} (4.70 sq mi)
- Elevation: 250 m (820 ft)
- Highest elevation: 345 m (1,132 ft)
- Lowest elevation: 230 m (750 ft)
- Population (2023): 547
  - Density: 44.9/km^{2} (116/sq mi)
- Time zone: UTC+01:00 (CET)
  - Summer (DST): UTC+02:00 (CEST)
- INSEE/Postal code: 81114 /81400
- ^{1} French Land Register data, which excludes lakes, ponds, glaciers > 1 km^{2} (0.386 sq mi or 247 acres) and river estuaries.

Labastide-Gabausse (French pronunciation: [labastid ɡabos]; Occitan: La Bastida Gavaussa) is a commune in the Tarn department and Occitanie region of southern France.

== See also ==
- Communes of the Tarn department
