= Laparrouquial =

- Commune
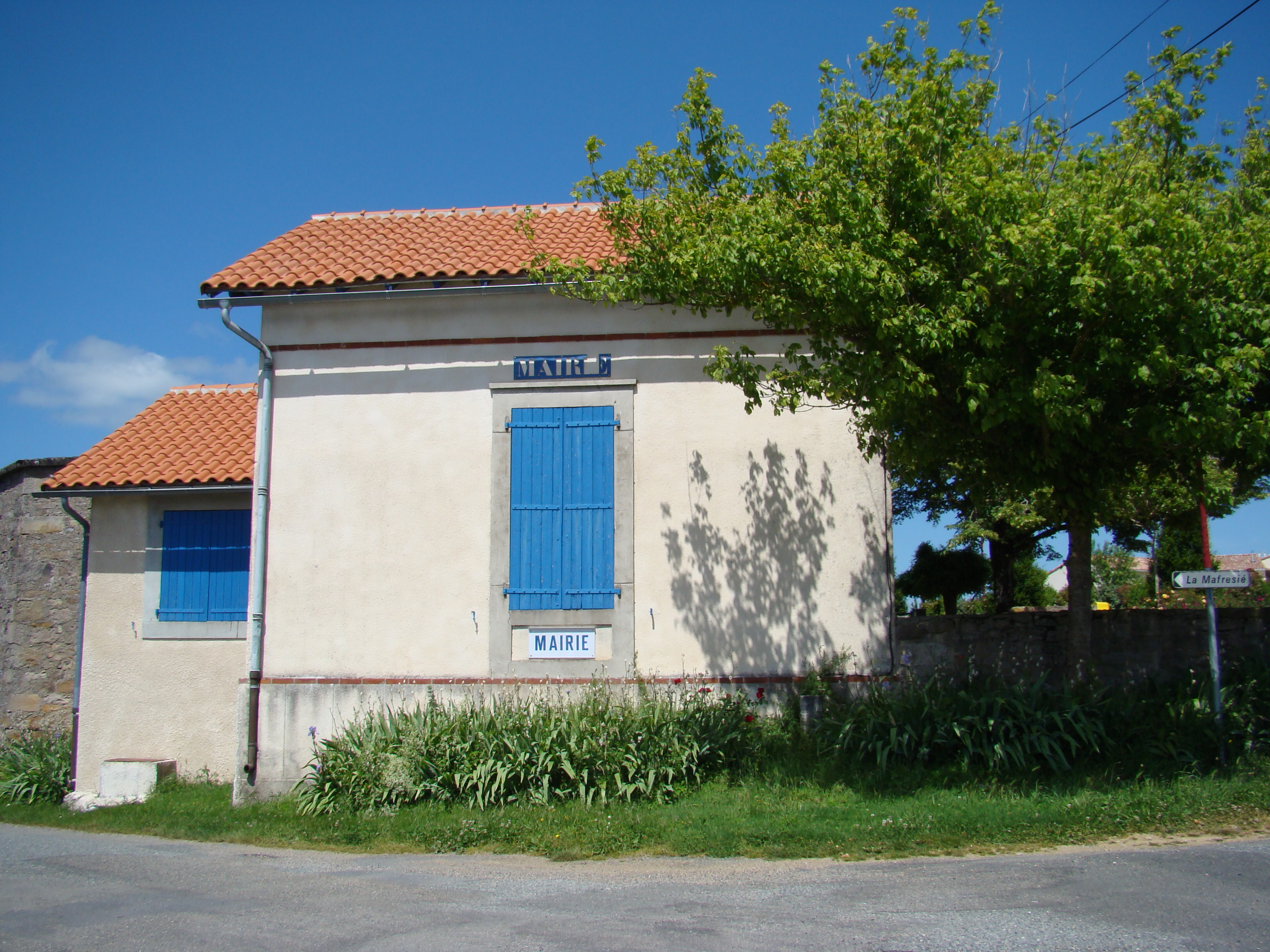
- Town hall
- Location of Laparrouquial
- Location within France Location within Occitanie
- Coordinates: 44°06′50″N 2°01′34″E
- Country: France
- Region: Occitania
- Department: Tarn
- Arrondissement: Albi
- Canton: Carmaux-2 Vallée du Cérou
- Intercommunality: CC du Cordais et du Causse

Government
  - Mayor (2020–2026): Laurent Deshayes
- Area^{1}: 8.43 km^{2} (3.25 sq mi)
- Elevation: 407 m (1,335 ft)
- Highest elevation: 502 m (1,647 ft)
- Lowest elevation: 181 m (594 ft)
- Population (2023): 91
  - Density: 11/km^{2} (28/sq mi)
- Time zone: UTC+01:00 (CET)
  - Summer (DST): UTC+02:00 (CEST)
- INSEE/Postal code: 81135 /81640
- ^{1} French Land Register data, which excludes lakes, ponds, glaciers > 1 km^{2} (0.386 sq mi or 247 acres) and river estuaries.

Laparrouquial (French pronunciation: [lapaʁukjal]; Occitan: La Parroquial, meaning the parish (land)) is a commune in the Tarn department in southern France.

== See also ==
- Communes of the Tarn department
