= Crespinet =

- Commune
- Coat of arms
- Location of Crespinet
- Location within France Location within Occitanie
- Coordinates: 43°57′20″N 2°18′20″E
- Country: France
- Region: Occitania
- Department: Tarn
- Arrondissement: Albi
- Canton: Carmaux-1 Le Ségala
- Intercommunality: Val 81

Government
  - Mayor (2020–2026): Bernard Miot
- Area^{1}: 9.15 km^{2} (3.53 sq mi)
- Elevation: 375 m (1,230 ft)
- Highest elevation: 385 m (1,263 ft)
- Lowest elevation: 160 m (520 ft)
- Population (2023): 182
  - Density: 19.9/km^{2} (51.5/sq mi)
- Time zone: UTC+01:00 (CET)
  - Summer (DST): UTC+02:00 (CEST)
- INSEE/Postal code: 81073 /81350
- ^{1} French Land Register data, which excludes lakes, ponds, glaciers > 1 km^{2} (0.386 sq mi or 247 acres) and river estuaries.

Crespinet (French pronunciation: [kʁɛspinɛ]) is a commune in the Tarn department and Occitanie region of southern France.

== See also ==
- Communes of the Tarn department
