= Souel =

- Commune
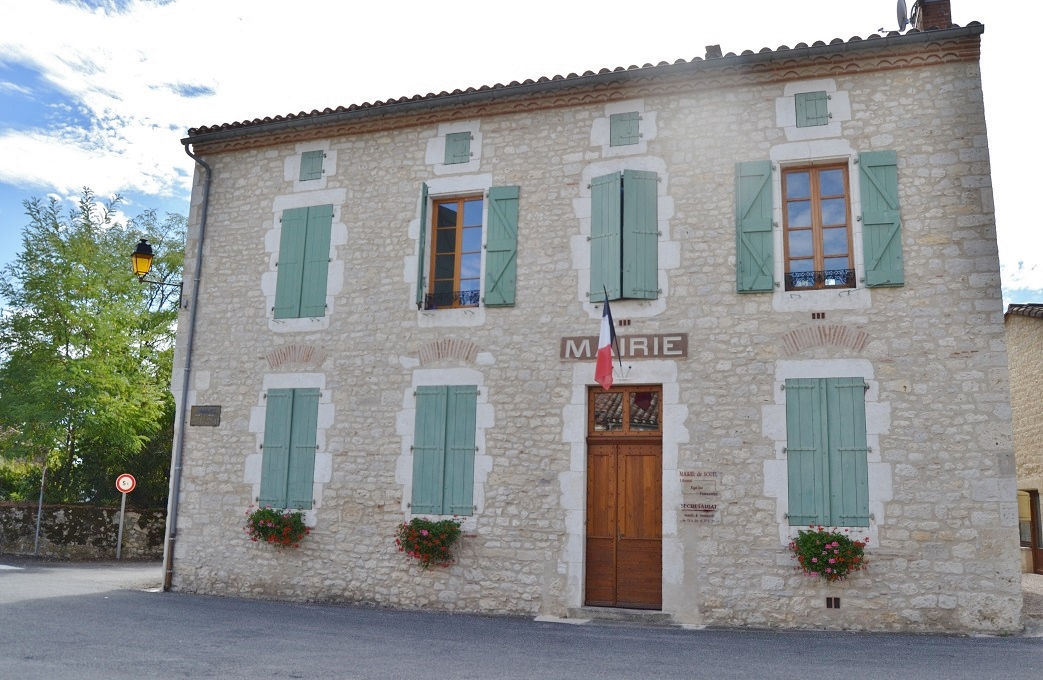
- Souel Town hall
- Location of Souel
- Location within France Location within Occitanie
- Coordinates: 44°01′52″N 1°57′22″E
- Country: France
- Region: Occitania
- Department: Tarn
- Arrondissement: Albi
- Canton: Carmaux-2 Vallée du Cérou

Government
  - Mayor (2020–2026): Frank Cebak
- Area^{1}: 9.7 km^{2} (3.7 sq mi)
- Elevation: 298 m (978 ft)
- Highest elevation: 306 m (1,004 ft)
- Lowest elevation: 184 m (604 ft)
- Population (2023): 175
  - Density: 18/km^{2} (47/sq mi)
- Time zone: UTC+01:00 (CET)
  - Summer (DST): UTC+02:00 (CEST)
- INSEE/Postal code: 81290 /81170
- ^{1} French Land Register data, which excludes lakes, ponds, glaciers > 1 km^{2} (0.386 sq mi or 247 acres) and river estuaries.

Souel (French pronunciation: [swɛl]; Occitan: Soelh) is a commune in the Tarn department and Occitanie region of southern France.

== See also ==
- Communes of the Tarn department
