= Le Riols =

- Commune
- Location of Le Riols
- Location within France Location within Occitanie
- Coordinates: 44°09′08″N 1°54′39″E
- Country: France
- Region: Occitania
- Department: Tarn
- Arrondissement: Albi
- Canton: Carmaux-2 Vallée du Cérou

Government
  - Mayor (2020–2026): Serge Besombes
- Area^{1}: 5.01 km^{2} (1.93 sq mi)
- Elevation: 150 m (490 ft)
- Highest elevation: 280 m (920 ft)
- Lowest elevation: 130 m (430 ft)
- Population (2023): 98
  - Density: 20/km^{2} (51/sq mi)
- Time zone: UTC+01:00 (CET)
  - Summer (DST): UTC+02:00 (CEST)
- INSEE/Postal code: 81224 /81170
- ^{1} French Land Register data, which excludes lakes, ponds, glaciers > 1 km^{2} (0.386 sq mi or 247 acres) and river estuaries.

Le Riols (French pronunciation: [lə ʁjɔl]; Occitan: Lo Riòl) is a commune in the Tarn department in southern France.

== See also ==
- Communes of the Tarn department
