= Sieurac =

- Commune
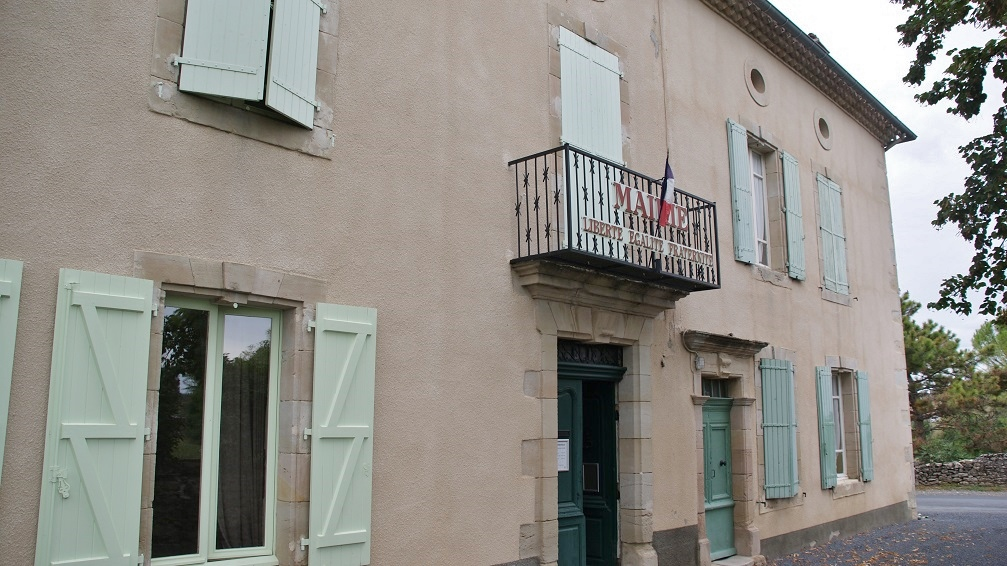
- Sieurac town hall

- Coat of arms
- Location of Sieurac
- Location within France Location within Occitanie
- Coordinates: 43°48′21″N 2°06′11″E
- Country: France
- Region: Occitania
- Department: Tarn
- Arrondissement: Albi
- Canton: Le Haut Dadou

Government
  - Mayor (2020–2026): Fabrice Marcuzzo
- Area^{1}: 8.72 km^{2} (3.37 sq mi)
- Elevation: 240 m (790 ft)
- Highest elevation: 265 m (869 ft)
- Lowest elevation: 195 m (640 ft)
- Population (2023): 256
  - Density: 29.4/km^{2} (76.0/sq mi)
- Time zone: UTC+01:00 (CET)
  - Summer (DST): UTC+02:00 (CEST)
- INSEE/Postal code: 81287 /81120
- ^{1} French Land Register data, which excludes lakes, ponds, glaciers > 1 km^{2} (0.386 sq mi or 247 acres) and river estuaries.

Sieurac (French pronunciation: [sjœʁak]; Occitan: Siurac) is a commune in the Tarn department in southern France.

== See also ==
- Communes of the Tarn department
