= Assac =

- Commune
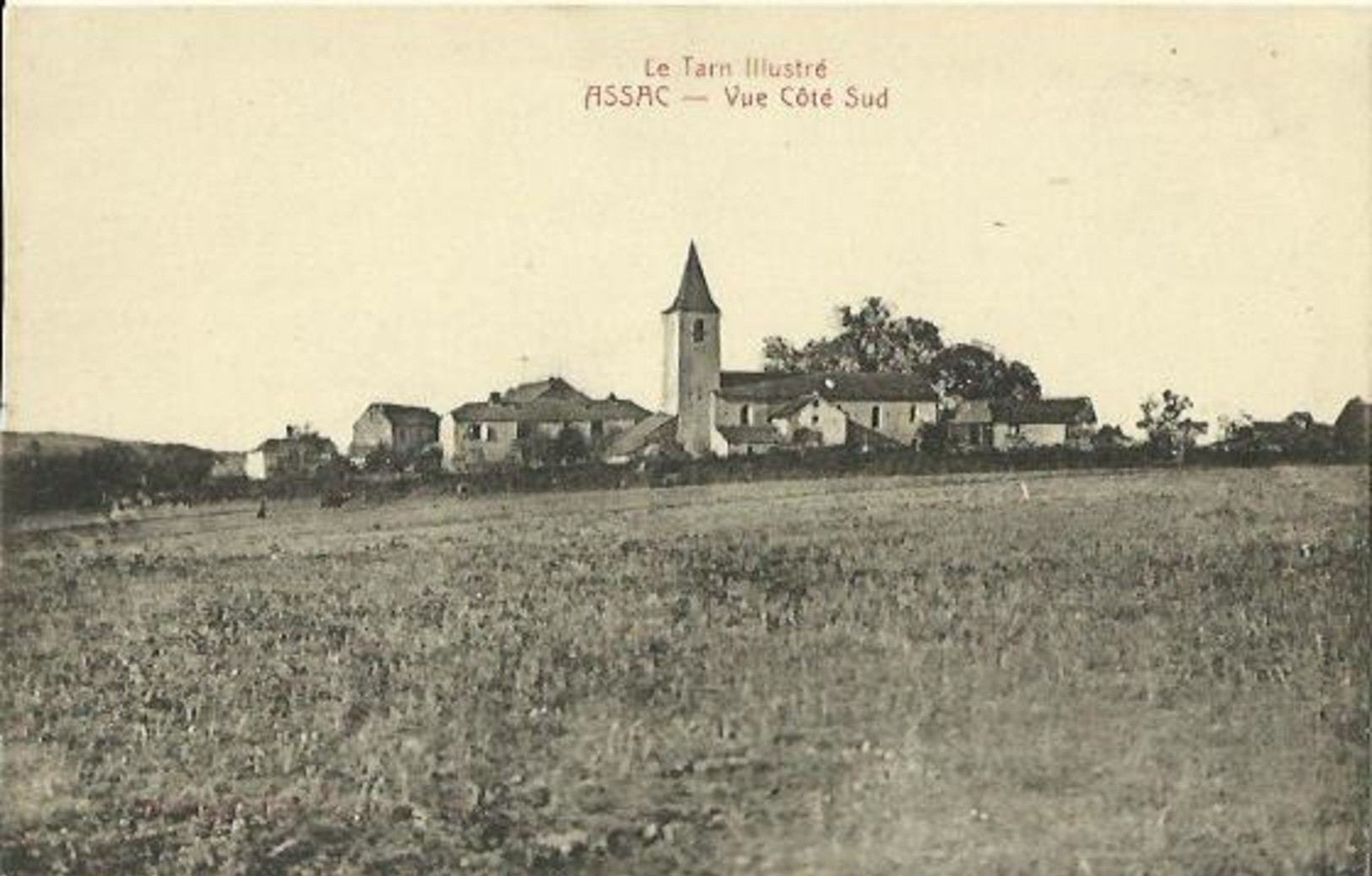

- Coat of arms
- Location of Assac
- Location within France Location within Occitanie
- Coordinates: 43°58′34″N 2°26′25″E
- Country: France
- Region: Occitania
- Department: Tarn
- Arrondissement: Albi
- Canton: Carmaux-1 Le Ségala
- Intercommunality: CC Val 81

Government
  - Mayor (2020–2026): Myriam Vigroux
- Area^{1}: 15.06 km^{2} (5.81 sq mi)
- Elevation: 451 m (1,480 ft)
- Highest elevation: 525 m (1,722 ft)
- Lowest elevation: 200 m (660 ft)
- Population (2023): 151
  - Density: 10.0/km^{2} (26.0/sq mi)
- Time zone: UTC+01:00 (CET)
  - Summer (DST): UTC+02:00 (CEST)
- INSEE/Postal code: 81019 /81340
- ^{1} French Land Register data, which excludes lakes, ponds, glaciers > 1 km^{2} (0.386 sq mi or 247 acres) and river estuaries.

Assac (French pronunciation: [asak]; Occitan: Açac) is a commune of the Tarn department in southern France.

== See also ==
- Communes of the Tarn department
