= Frausseilles =

- Commune
- Coat of arms
- Location of Frausseilles
- Location within France Location within Occitanie
- Coordinates: 44°01′45″N 1°55′51″E
- Country: France
- Region: Occitania
- Department: Tarn
- Arrondissement: Albi
- Canton: Carmaux-2 Vallée du Cérou
- Intercommunality: CC du Cordais et du Causse

Government
  - Mayor (2021–2026): Arielle Brun
- Area^{1}: 5.87 km^{2} (2.27 sq mi)
- Elevation: 280 m (920 ft)
- Highest elevation: 301 m (988 ft)
- Lowest elevation: 205 m (673 ft)
- Population (2023): 75
  - Density: 13/km^{2} (33/sq mi)
- Time zone: UTC+01:00 (CET)
  - Summer (DST): UTC+02:00 (CEST)
- INSEE/Postal code: 81095 /81170
- ^{1} French Land Register data, which excludes lakes, ponds, glaciers > 1 km^{2} (0.386 sq mi or 247 acres) and river estuaries.

Frausseilles (French pronunciation: [fʁosɛj]) is a commune in the Tarn department in southern France.

== See also ==
- Communes of the Tarn department
