= Lamillarié =

- Commune
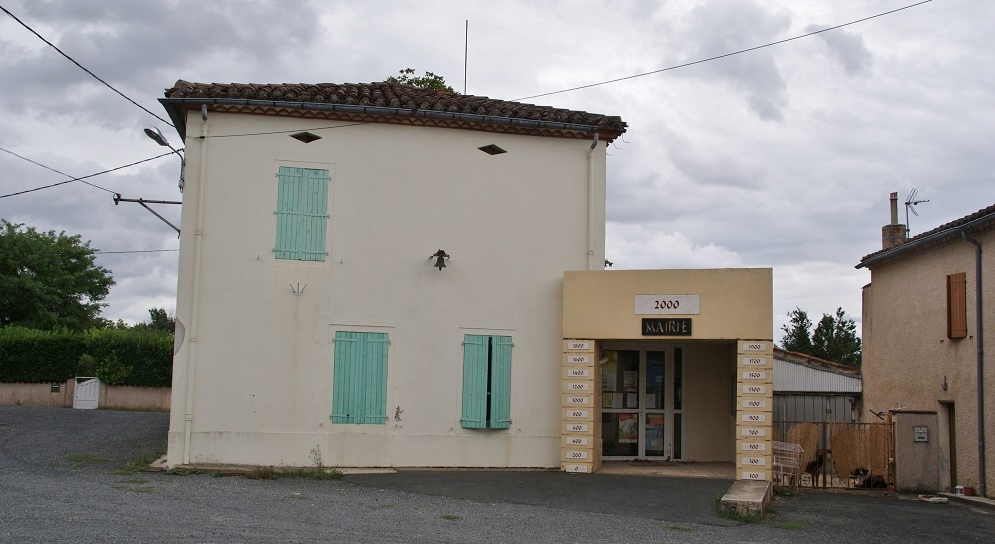
- Lamillarié Town hall
- Location of Lamillarié
- Location within France Location within Occitanie
- Coordinates: 43°50′54″N 2°09′34″E
- Country: France
- Region: Occitania
- Department: Tarn
- Arrondissement: Albi
- Canton: Le Haut Dadou

Government
  - Mayor (2020–2026): Hervé Boulade
- Area^{1}: 13.95 km^{2} (5.39 sq mi)
- Elevation: 340 m (1,120 ft)
- Highest elevation: 307 m (1,007 ft)
- Lowest elevation: 209 m (686 ft)
- Population (2023): 517
  - Density: 37.1/km^{2} (96.0/sq mi)
- Time zone: UTC+01:00 (CET)
  - Summer (DST): UTC+02:00 (CEST)
- INSEE/Postal code: 81133 /81120
- ^{1} French Land Register data, which excludes lakes, ponds, glaciers > 1 km^{2} (0.386 sq mi or 247 acres) and river estuaries.

Lamillarié (Occitan: La Milhariá, meaning the corn mills) is a commune in the Tarn department in southern France.

== See also ==
- Communes of the Tarn department
