= Tonnac =

- Commune
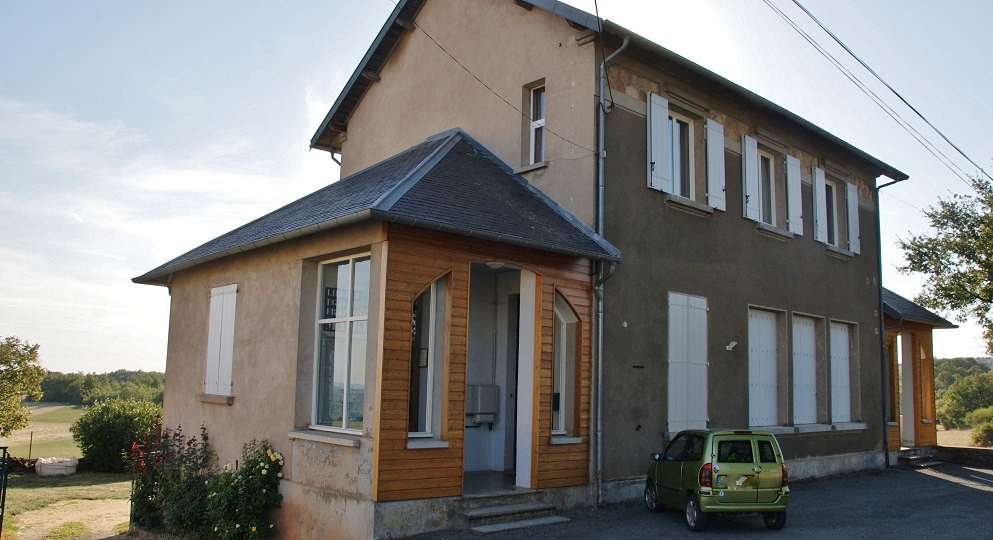
- Tonnac Town hall
- Location of Tonnac
- Location within France Location within Occitanie
- Coordinates: 44°03′53″N 1°52′07″E
- Country: France
- Region: Occitania
- Department: Tarn
- Arrondissement: Albi
- Canton: Carmaux-2 Vallée du Cérou
- Intercommunality: CA Gaillac-Graulhet

Government
  - Mayor (2020–2026): Jean-Paul Lalande
- Area^{1}: 11.23 km^{2} (4.34 sq mi)
- Elevation: 320 m (1,050 ft)
- Highest elevation: 523 m (1,716 ft)
- Lowest elevation: 230 m (750 ft)
- Population (2023): 113
  - Density: 10.1/km^{2} (26.1/sq mi)
- Time zone: UTC+01:00 (CET)
  - Summer (DST): UTC+02:00 (CEST)
- INSEE/Postal code: 81300 /81170
- ^{1} French Land Register data, which excludes lakes, ponds, glaciers > 1 km^{2} (0.386 sq mi or 247 acres) and river estuaries.

Tonnac (French pronunciation: [tɔnak]; Occitan: Totnac) is a commune in the Tarn department in southern France.

== See also ==
- Communes of the Tarn department
