= Canton of Carmaux-2 Vallée du Cérou =

Coordinates: 44.05°N 2.16°E

The canton of Carmaux-2 Vallée du Cérou is an administrative division of the Tarn department, southern France. It was created at the French canton reorganisation which came into effect in March 2015. Its seat is in Carmaux.

It consists of the following communes:

1. Amarens
2. Blaye-les-Mines
3. Bournazel
4. Les Cabannes
5. Carmaux (partly)
6. Combefa
7. Cordes-sur-Ciel
8. Donnazac
9. Frausseilles
10. Itzac
11. Labarthe-Bleys
12. Labastide-Gabausse
13. Lacapelle-Ségalar
14. Laparrouquial
15. Livers-Cazelles
16. Loubers
17. Marnaves
18. Milhars
19. Monestiés
20. Montirat
21. Montrosier
22. Mouzieys-Panens
23. Noailles
24. Penne
25. Le Riols
26. Roussayrolles
27. Saint-Benoît-de-Carmaux
28. Saint-Christophe
29. Saint-Marcel-Campes
30. Saint-Martin-Laguépie
31. Saint-Michel-de-Vax
32. Salles
33. Le Ségur
34. Souel
35. Taïx
36. Tonnac
37. Trévien
38. Vaour
39. Vindrac-Alayrac
40. Virac
