= Itzac =

- Commune
- Location of Itzac
- Location within France Location within Occitanie
- Coordinates: 44°02′33″N 1°51′36″E
- Country: France
- Region: Occitania
- Department: Tarn
- Arrondissement: Albi
- Canton: Carmaux-2 Vallée du Cérou
- Intercommunality: CA Gaillac-Graulhet

Government
  - Mayor (2020–2026): Christian Lonqueu
- Area^{1}: 11.24 km^{2} (4.34 sq mi)
- Elevation: 240 m (790 ft)
- Highest elevation: 466 m (1,529 ft)
- Lowest elevation: 220 m (720 ft)
- Population (2023): 178
  - Density: 15.8/km^{2} (41.0/sq mi)
- Time zone: UTC+01:00 (CET)
  - Summer (DST): UTC+02:00 (CEST)
- INSEE/Postal code: 81108 /81170
- ^{1} French Land Register data, which excludes lakes, ponds, glaciers > 1 km^{2} (0.386 sq mi or 247 acres) and river estuaries.

Itzac is a commune in the Tarn department in southern France.

== See also ==
- Communes of the Tarn department
