= Penne, Tarn =

Penne Pena (Occitan)
- Commune
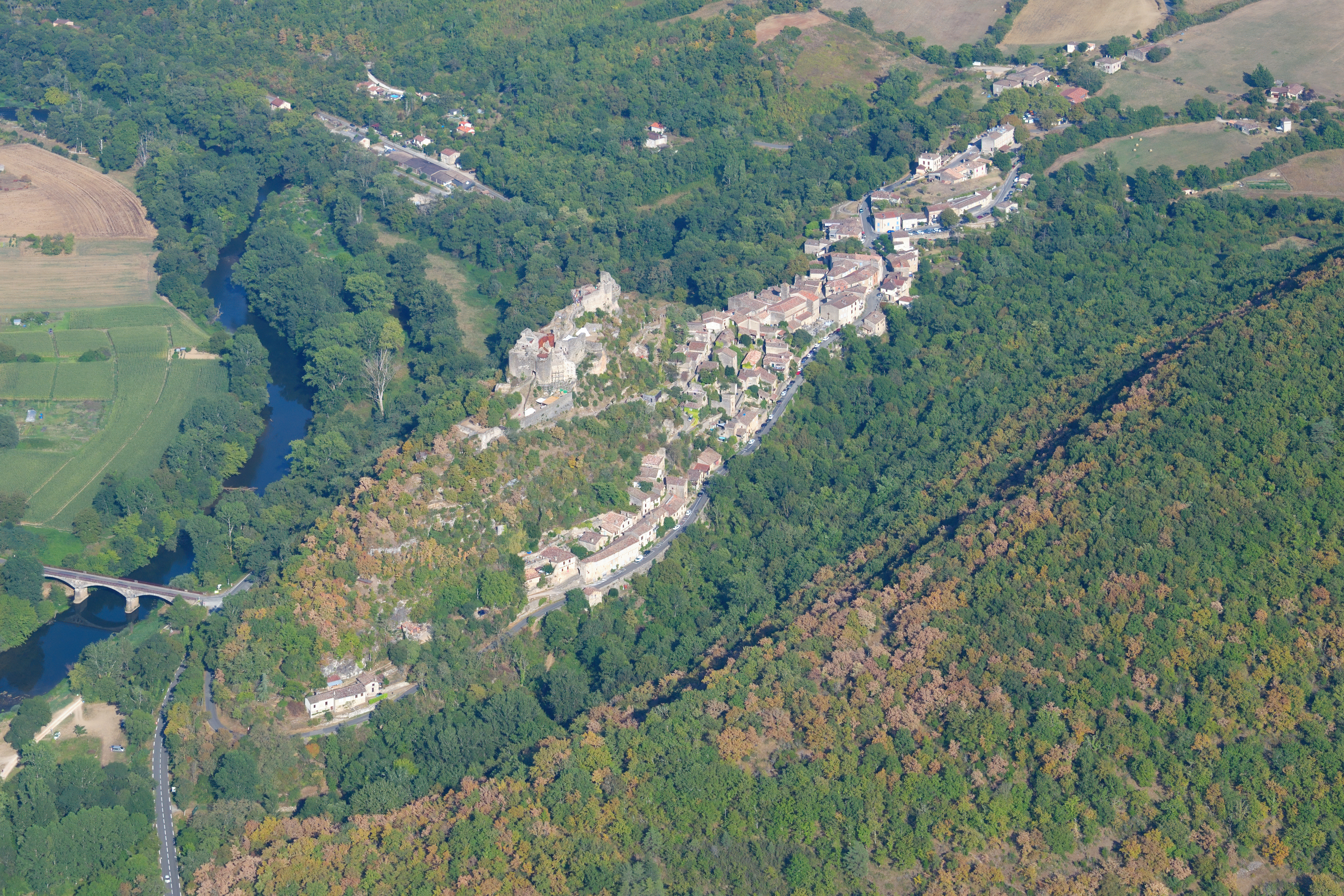

- Coat of arms
- Location of Penne
- Location within France Location within Occitanie
- Coordinates: 44°04′41″N 1°43′52″E
- Country: France
- Region: Occitania
- Department: Tarn
- Arrondissement: Albi
- Canton: Carmaux-2 Vallée du Cérou
- Intercommunality: CC du Cordais et du Causse

Government
  - Mayor (2020–2026): Laurence Poillerat-Zeganadin
- Area^{1}: 64.04 km^{2} (24.73 sq mi)
- Elevation: 114 m (374 ft)
- Highest elevation: 489 m (1,604 ft)
- Lowest elevation: 93 m (305 ft)
- Population (2023): 602
  - Density: 9.40/km^{2} (24.3/sq mi)
- Time zone: UTC+01:00 (CET)
  - Summer (DST): UTC+02:00 (CEST)
- INSEE/Postal code: 81206 /81140
- ^{1} French Land Register data, which excludes lakes, ponds, glaciers > 1 km^{2} (0.386 sq mi or 247 acres) and river estuaries.

Penne (French pronunciation: [pɛn]; Occitan: Pena, meaning 'feather') is a commune in the Tarn department in the Occitanie region in Southern France. As of 2023, the population of the commune was 602. Penne is situated 32 km (19.8 mi) to the east of Montauban, on the river Aveyron.

== History ==
In the absence of literary works describing this little-known village, indications of its medieval character can be found in various travel articles and guides, such as the Penne Tourism and Holiday Guide which states:

The village extends along the rocky outcrop under the protection of its medieval castle ... The village has retained its authenticity, its narrow streets lined with timbered houses and wooden corbels, ancient grain measures, its Androne, its mullioned windows and doors.

The mountainous and hilly terrain, coupled with poor soil, make for a local economy that is precarious. Younger generations continually move away from the area, to make a better living in Paris and other major cities.

In the 21st century, the industry of tourism in Tarn appears to have stemmed the decline in the Penne population to some extent, as statistics show a small increase over ten years: from 552 inhabitants in 2007 to 576 in 2017.

=== Bronze Age site ===
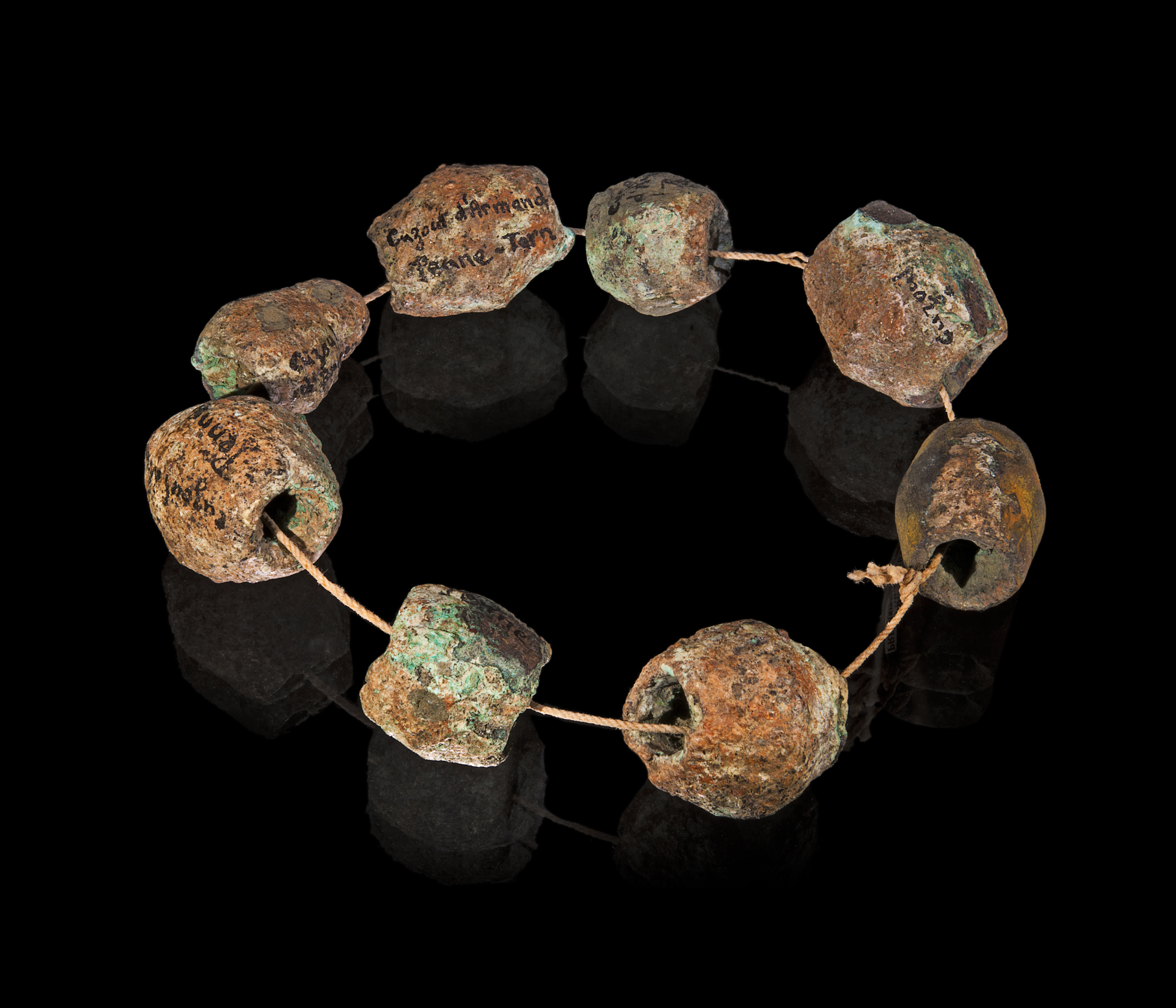
Bronze Age bead necklace, Penne, Tarn

The first archaeological finds indicating human activity in the Languedoc region date back to the Holocene Bronze Age, 1800–1500 BC, according to Bilotte, Duranthon and Palevol.

In 2006 these writers revived interest in the work of scientist Jean-Baptiste Noulet (1802–1890), who had explored the Tarn area in the mid-19th century and found evidence of human habitation in many of the caves there. Working in Penne in 1851, within a cave known as Le Cuzoul d'Armand or Grotte Mazuc, Noulet found several prehistoric artifacts, including a bronze and pearl necklace, now held in the Noulet Collection at the Muséum de Toulouse.

=== Medieval fortified village ===
According to the historical account on the Southwest Story web site, "the first reference to a castle in the village of Penne dates from 825 AD and its first known señor was Geoffroi, mentioned in 1096 in documents related to Raymond, Count of Toulouse".

Throughout the Middle Ages (5th to 15th centuries) the site of Penne was of military strategic importance, being situated on the borders of the provinces of Albigeois, Quercy and Rouergue, with its fortress perched atop a cliff overlooking the River Aveyron. As such, it was frequently the target of attack, most notably during the Albigensian Crusade, a twenty-year military campaign (1209–1229) initiated by the King Philip II of France and the Roman Catholic Pope Innocent III. Ostensibly, the objective of the crusade was the elimination of all Cathars in Southern France, but this coincided with the French King's political ambition to annex this area to his northern territories. People who adhered to Catharic principles were held to be anti-Catholic heretics; as narrated by McCaffrey, "their treatment was savage and merciless – heretics and their sympathisers were often either slaughtered or burned alive at the stake".

The castle remained in use, seeing repeated conflicts, such as the Hundred Years War (1337–1453) between England and France, as well as the French Wars of Religion (1562–1598) between Protestants and Roman Catholics during which it was partly destroyed. It was then abandoned for approximately 400 years.

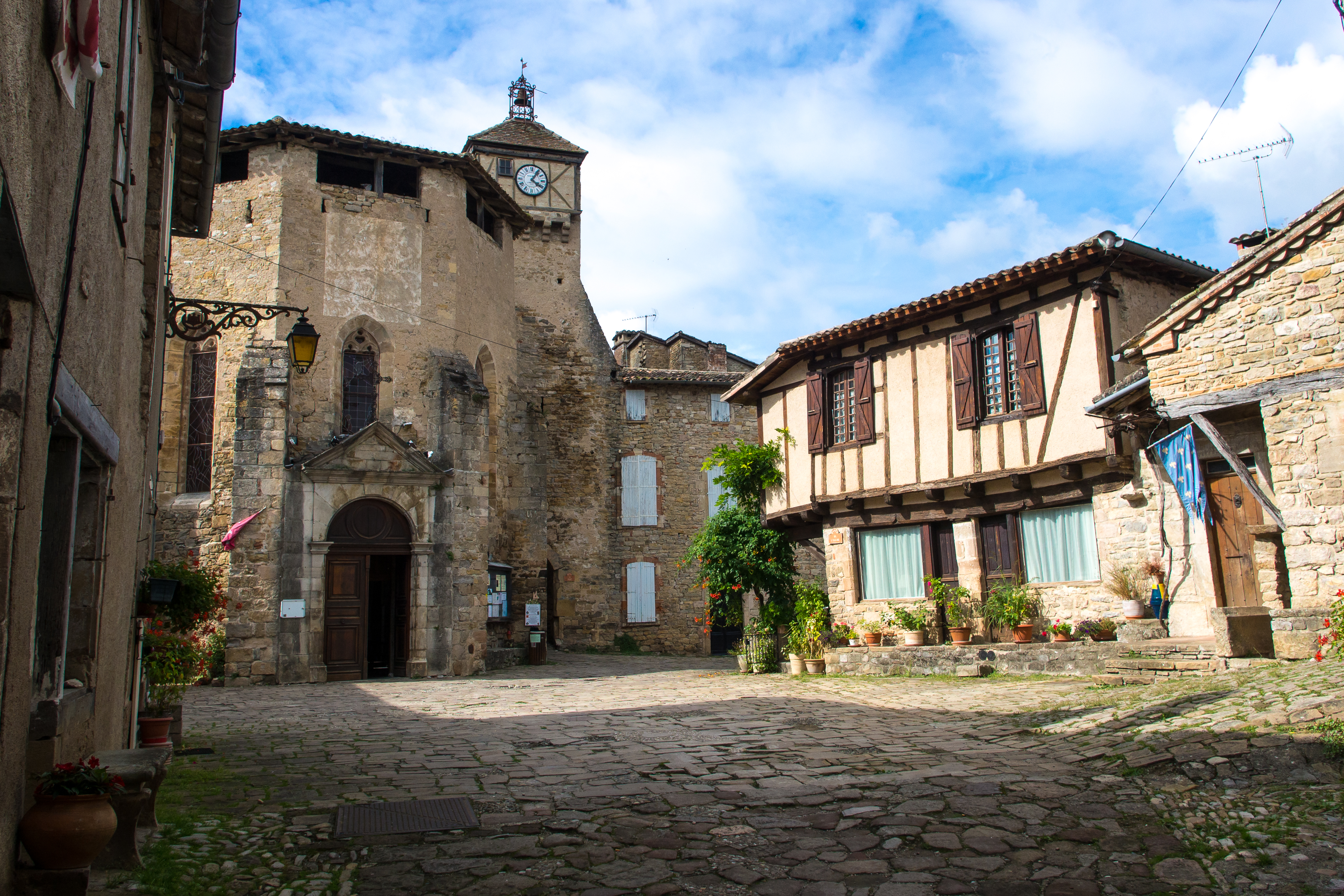
The village centre of Penne

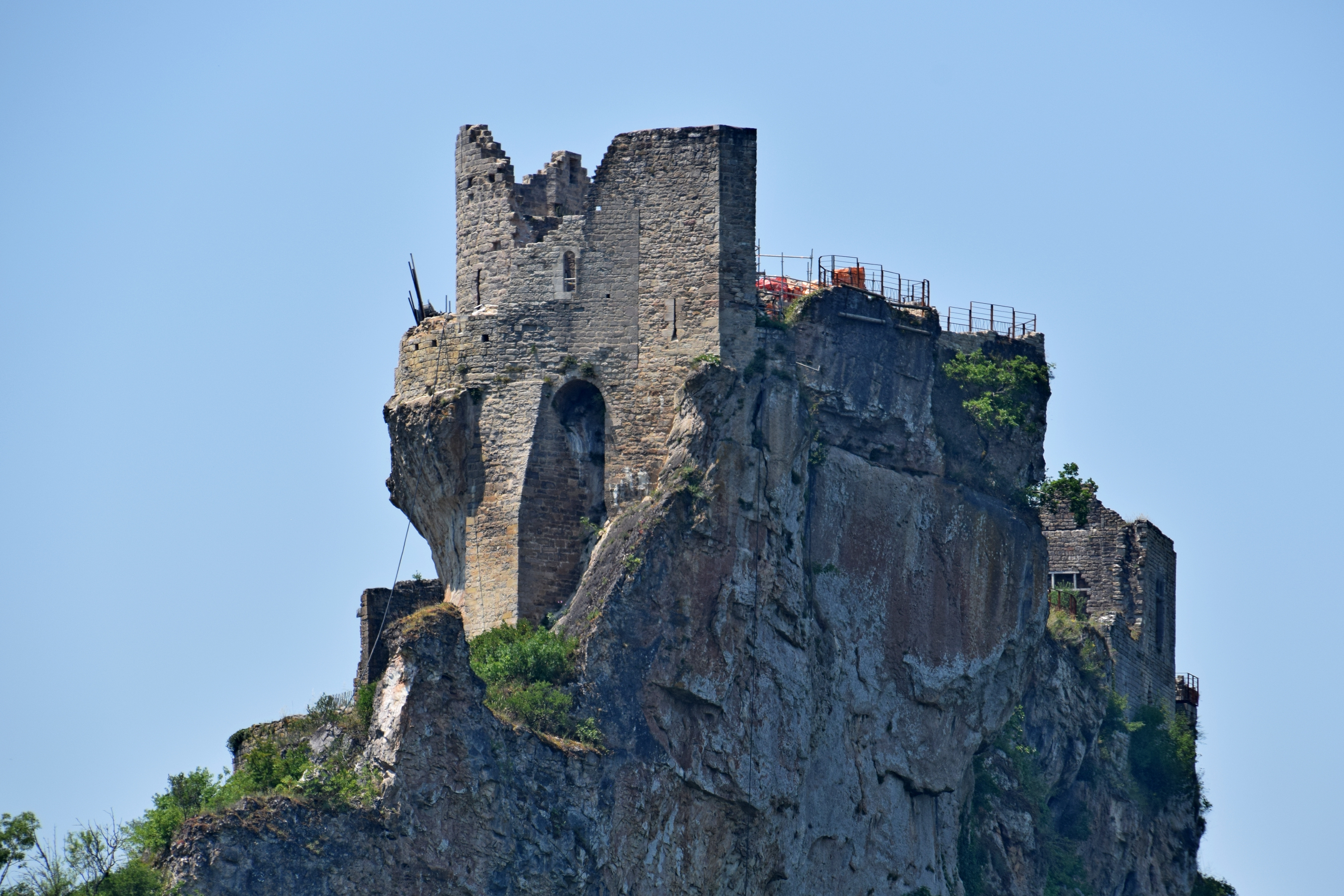
The ruins of the Castle of Penne, known locally as the Forteresse de Penne

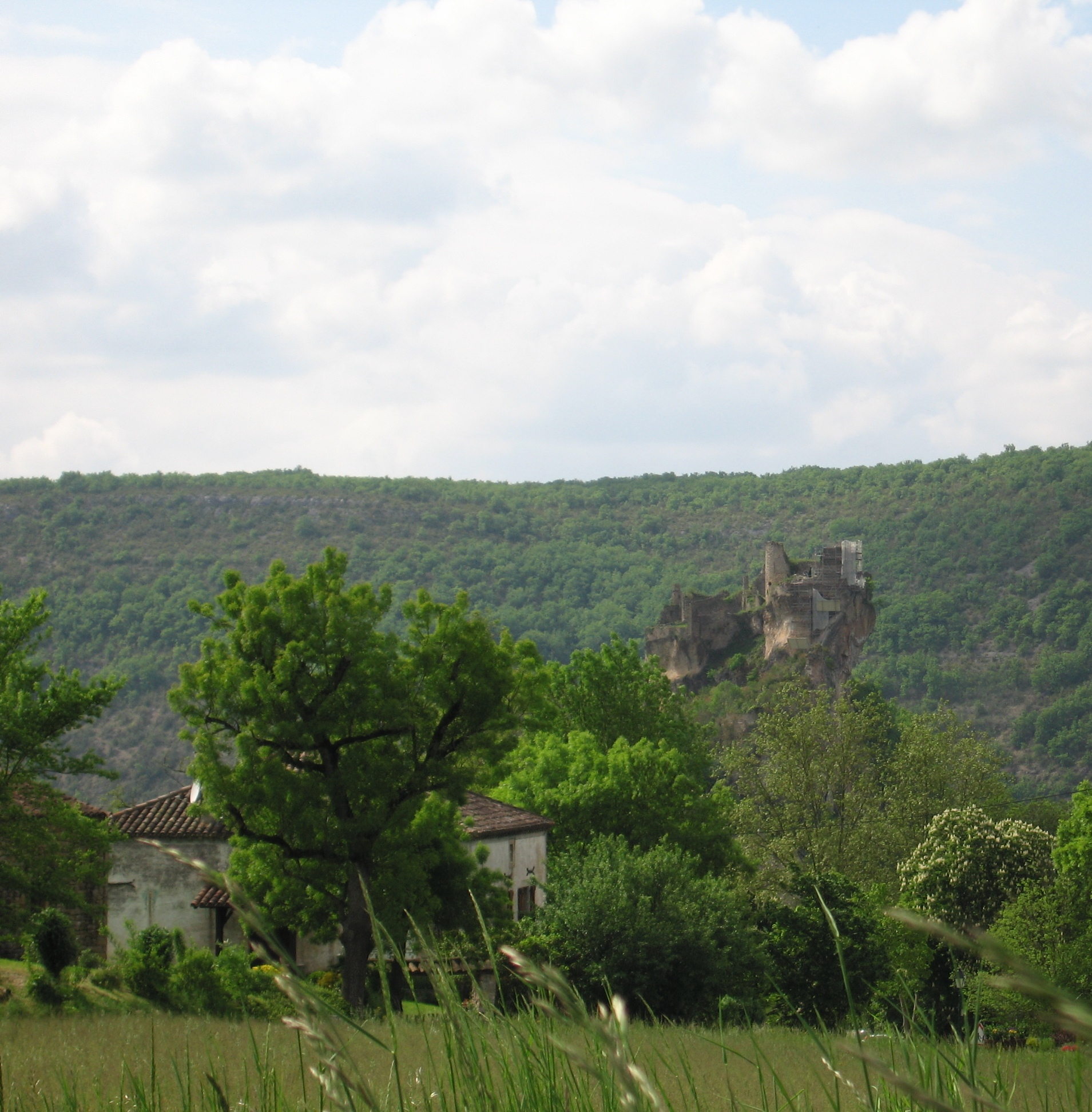
Penne and its medieval castle

Interest in the village's architecture and history was re-ignited in 1902 when the castle was officially declared to be a monument historique of France, after which restoration of the ruins began; the work is still ongoing. The remains of the castle include the dungeon, the ramparts and a chapel. The Castle of Penne is open to the public from mid-February until mid-November each year, with educational events and pageants being performed in July and August.

== Sainte-Catherine church ==
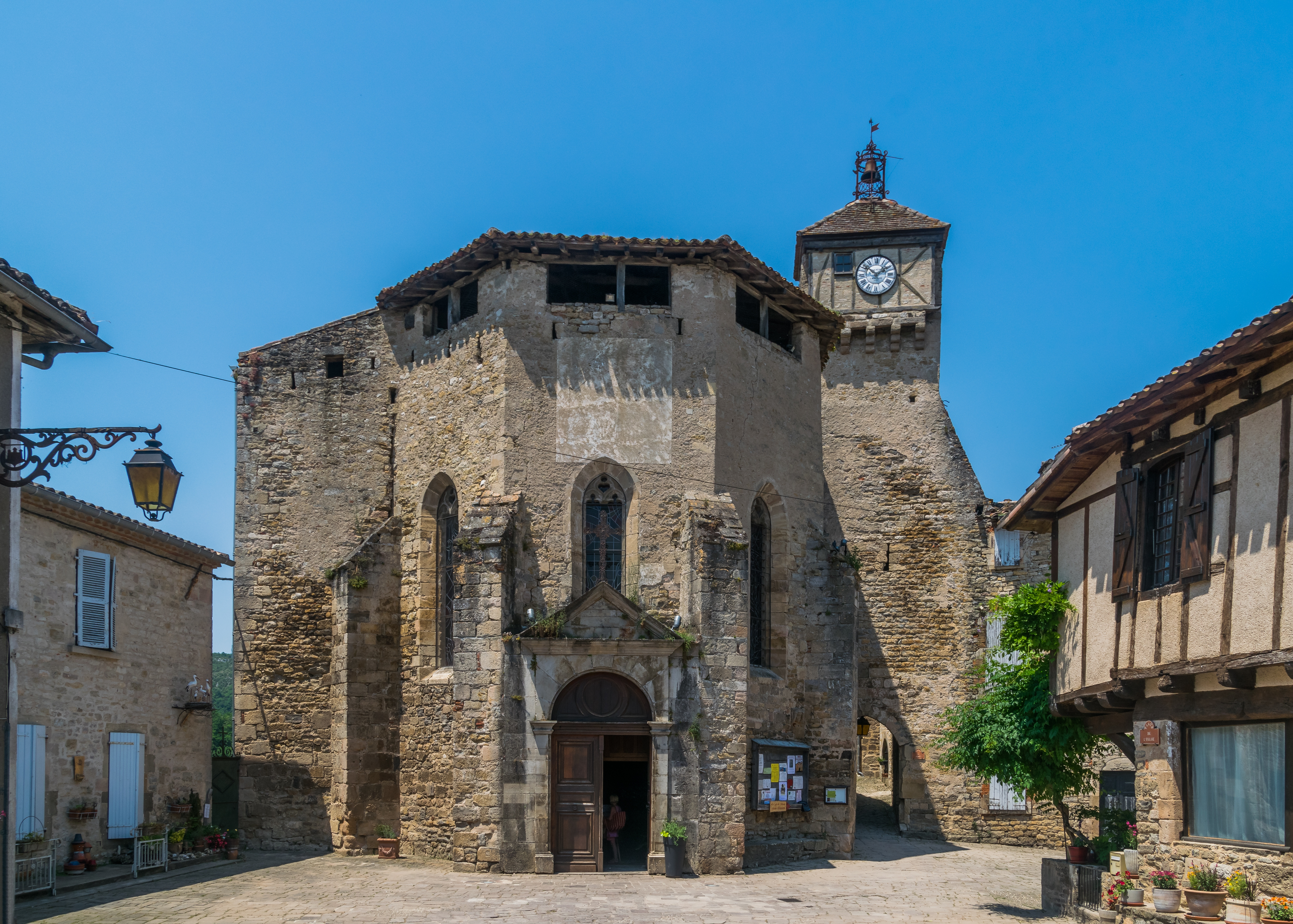
The church of Sainte-Catherine de Penne

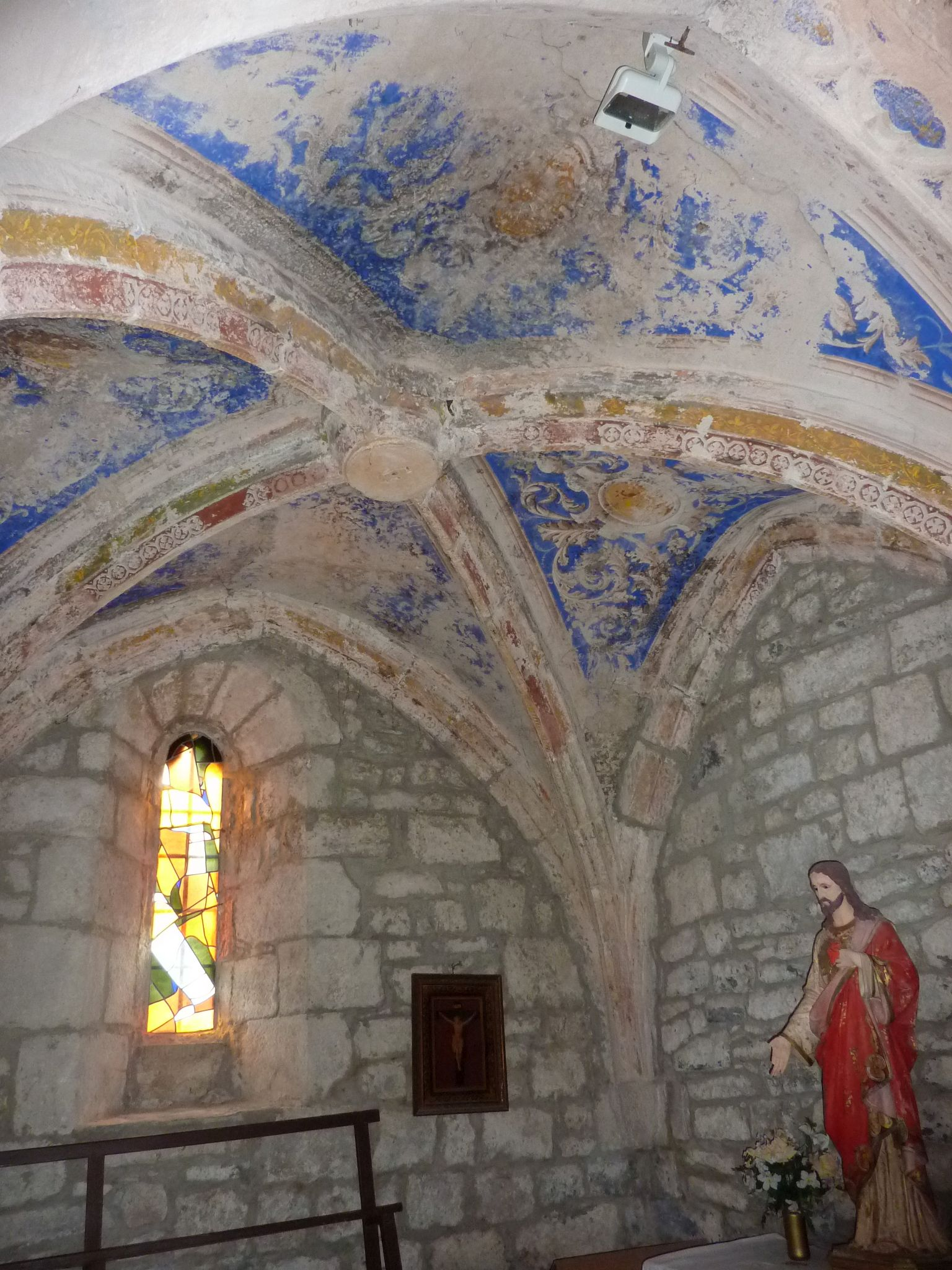
Interior of Sainte-Catherine de Penne

The municipal council provides information about the church of Sainte-Catherine de Penne, which includes the following points of interest:

- The church has undergone numerous changes over the centuries. It was originally built around the end of the 13th century, in the Occitan Gothic style; several 13th century features remain, such as the holy water stoup.
- It formed part of the defensive system of walls; it was at the entrance to the village.
- During the Wars of Religion in the 16th century, the building was badly damaged; the church bells were thrown into a well, but later retrieved and one was able to be restored.
- It was re-roofed and restored during the reign of Henry IV, known by the epithet Good King Henry (1589–1610).

Each century since has seen intermittent efforts to restore and improve the church, including a major re-orientation of the building in 1876. The tabernacle in the choir is of painted and gilded wood; it was registered as a monument Historique on 6 June 1993. The church and belfry were registered as a monument historique on 29 December 1954.

== The legend of Adalaïs and Raymond ==
There is a legend that in the early 13th century the Castle of Penne was owned by the noblewoman Adalaïs (or Adélays) – a great beauty, famous for cultivation of the chivalric arts and for commissioning brilliant pageants and festivals. Adalaïs was courted by the head of the powerful House of Toulouse, Raymond Jourdain.

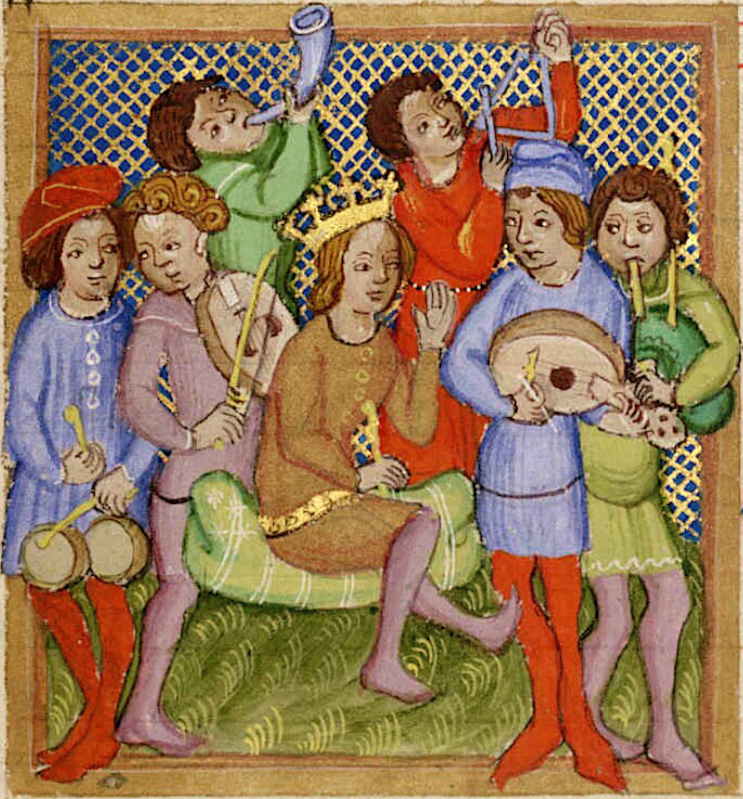
Troubadour entertaining a royal audience

Count Raymond Jourdain, a highly accomplished knight in the chivalric tradition, is said to have pledged himself to Adalaïs, before being called away to war. When she was told that he had been killed in battle, her grief was such that she renounced her noble life; she made the irreversible decision to enter a monastery. However, against all expectations, Raymond Jourdain recovered from his battle wounds and returned to Penne, where he found that Adalaïs was effectively lost to him. After an extended period of mourning he found a replacement for Adalaïs, in the person of Élise (or Alice) de Montfort, as the fable tells it.

An alternative version of the legend is related by Rutherford, who records that Raymond Jourdain was involved with Madame Mabine Rais, the wife of the Viscount of Albi, not Adalaïs of Penne; Mabine died of grief at his reported death, rather than entering a monastery.

Another version of the story, also told by Rutherford, names Raymond of Miraval – a famous troubadour and favourite of Raymond Jourdain – as the ardent suitor of one Adalaïs, the wife of Bernard of Boisasso, the lord of the Castle of Lombes. Their story is filled with intrigue and deceit, but ended when Adalaïs tricked Raymond by, instead of spending the night with him, consorting with the King of Saxony.

Works by Raymond of Miraval still exist; they include two songs which link the names of Adalaïs and Raymond.

== Climate ==
Météo-France states that the overall climate of Penne is very similar to that of the city of Montauban.

== See also ==
- Communes of the Tarn department
- Tourism in Tarn
