= Amarens =

- Commune
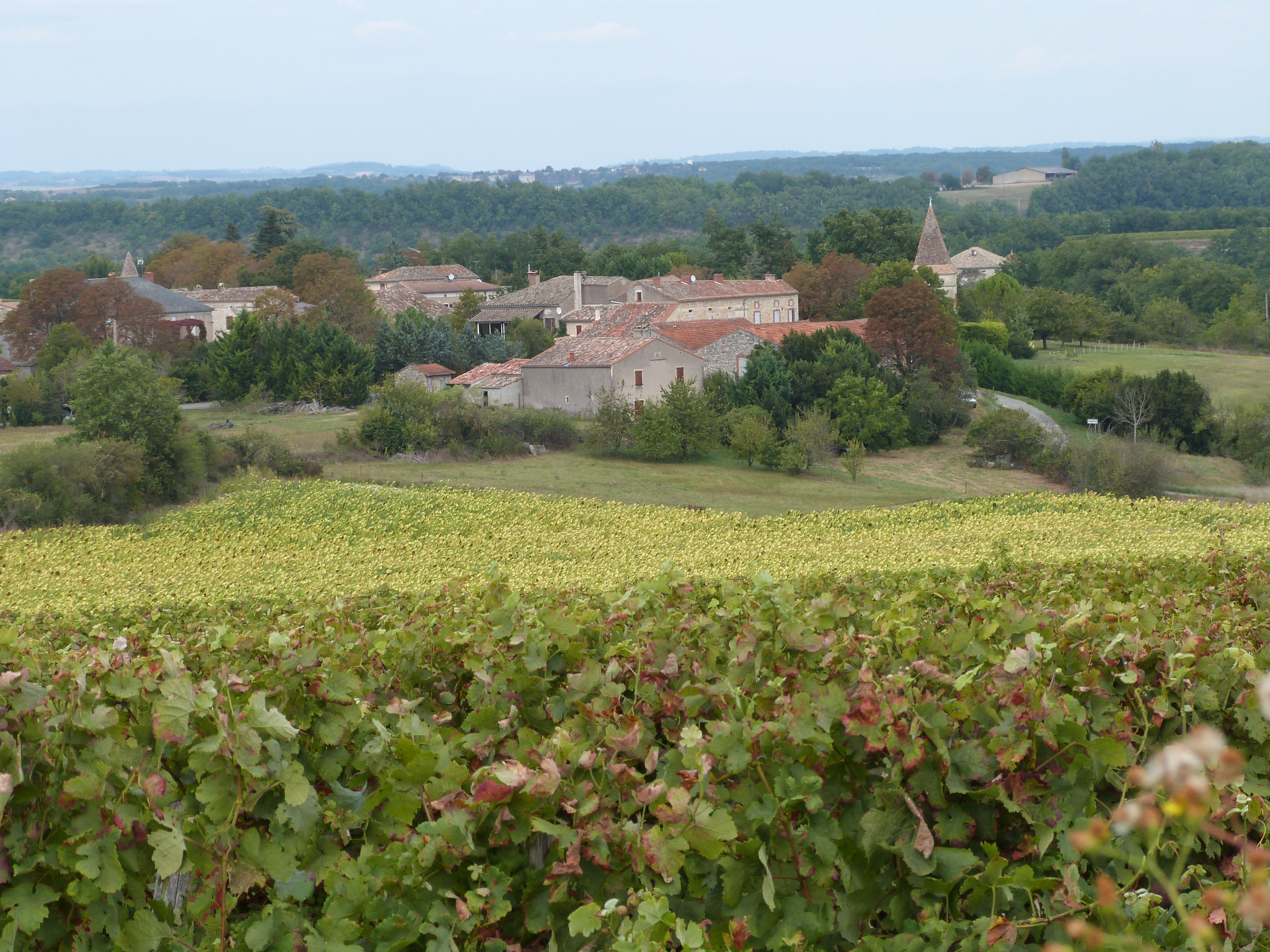
- A general view of Amarens

- Coat of arms
- Location of Amarens
- Location within France Location within Occitanie
- Coordinates: 44°02′19″N 1°54′51″E
- Country: France
- Region: Occitania
- Department: Tarn
- Arrondissement: Albi
- Canton: Carmaux-2 Vallée du Cérou
- Intercommunality: CC du Cordais et du Causse

Government
  - Mayor (2020–2026): Patrick Montels
- Area^{1}: 4.88 km^{2} (1.88 sq mi)
- Elevation: 265 m (869 ft)
- Highest elevation: 292 m (958 ft)
- Lowest elevation: 175 m (574 ft)
- Population (2023): 61
  - Density: 13/km^{2} (32/sq mi)
- Time zone: UTC+01:00 (CET)
  - Summer (DST): UTC+02:00 (CEST)
- INSEE/Postal code: 81009 /81170
- ^{1} French Land Register data, which excludes lakes, ponds, glaciers > 1 km^{2} (0.386 sq mi or 247 acres) and river estuaries.

Amarens is a commune of the Tarn department in southern France.

== See also ==
- Communes of the Tarn department
