= Monestiés =

- Commune
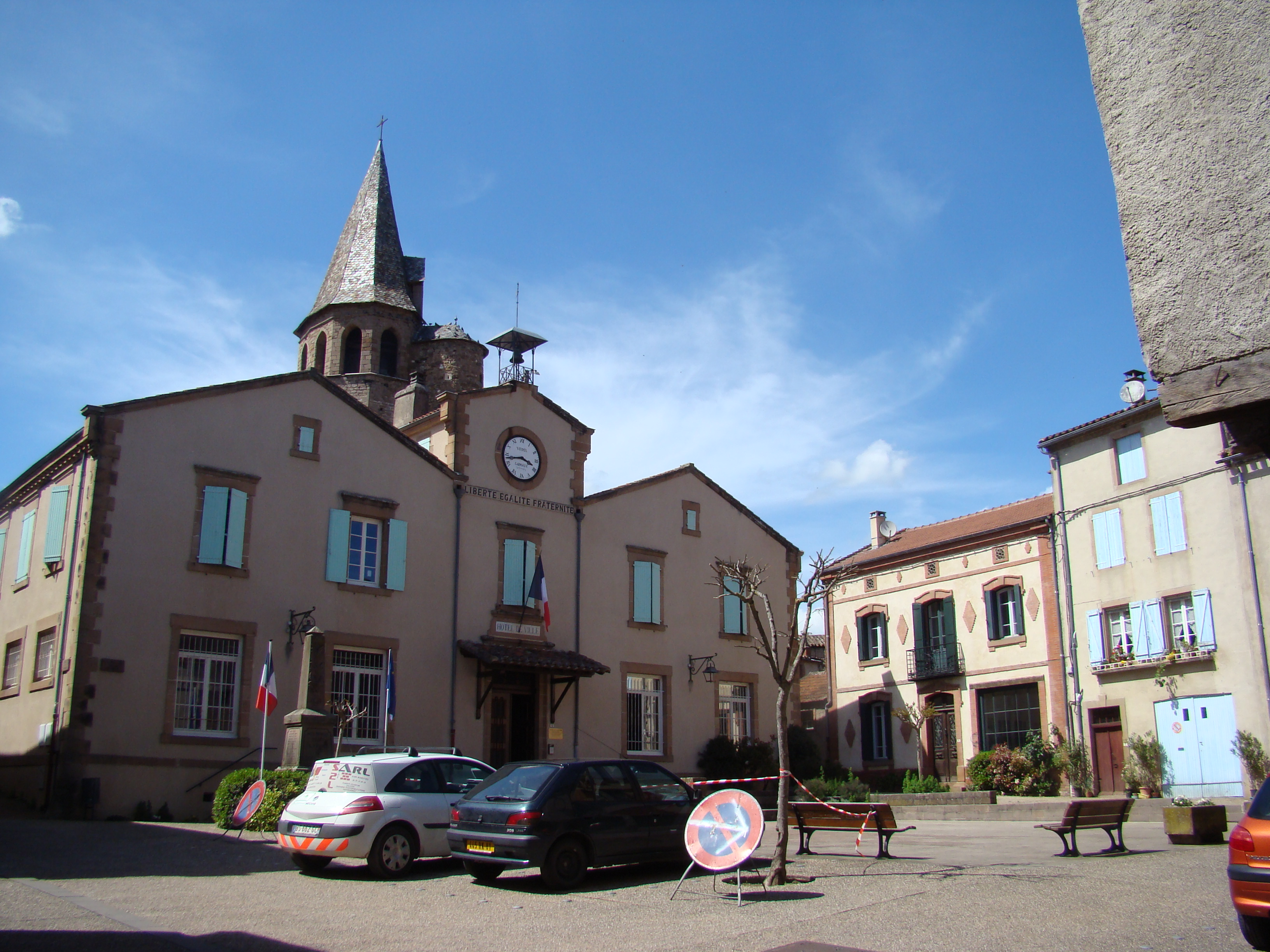
- The town hall in Monestiés

- Coat of arms
- Location of Monestiés
- Location within France Location within Occitanie
- Coordinates: 44°04′19″N 2°05′52″E
- Country: France
- Region: Occitania
- Department: Tarn
- Arrondissement: Albi
- Canton: Carmaux-2 Vallée du Cérou

Government
  - Mayor (2020–2026): Denis Marty
- Area^{1}: 26.83 km^{2} (10.36 sq mi)
- Elevation: 200 m (660 ft)
- Highest elevation: 437 m (1,434 ft)
- Lowest elevation: 190 m (620 ft)
- Population (2023): 1,381
  - Density: 51.47/km^{2} (133.3/sq mi)
- Time zone: UTC+01:00 (CET)
  - Summer (DST): UTC+02:00 (CEST)
- INSEE/Postal code: 81170 /81640
- ^{1} French Land Register data, which excludes lakes, ponds, glaciers > 1 km^{2} (0.386 sq mi or 247 acres) and river estuaries.

Monestiés (French pronunciation: [mɔnɛstje]; Occitan: Monestièr, meaning monastery) is a commune in the Tarn department in southern France.

It is a member of the Les Plus Beaux Villages de France ("The Most Beautiful Villages of France") association.

== Geography ==
The commune is traversed by the Cérou river.

== See also ==
- Communes of the Tarn department
