= Bournazel, Tarn =

Bournazel
- Commune
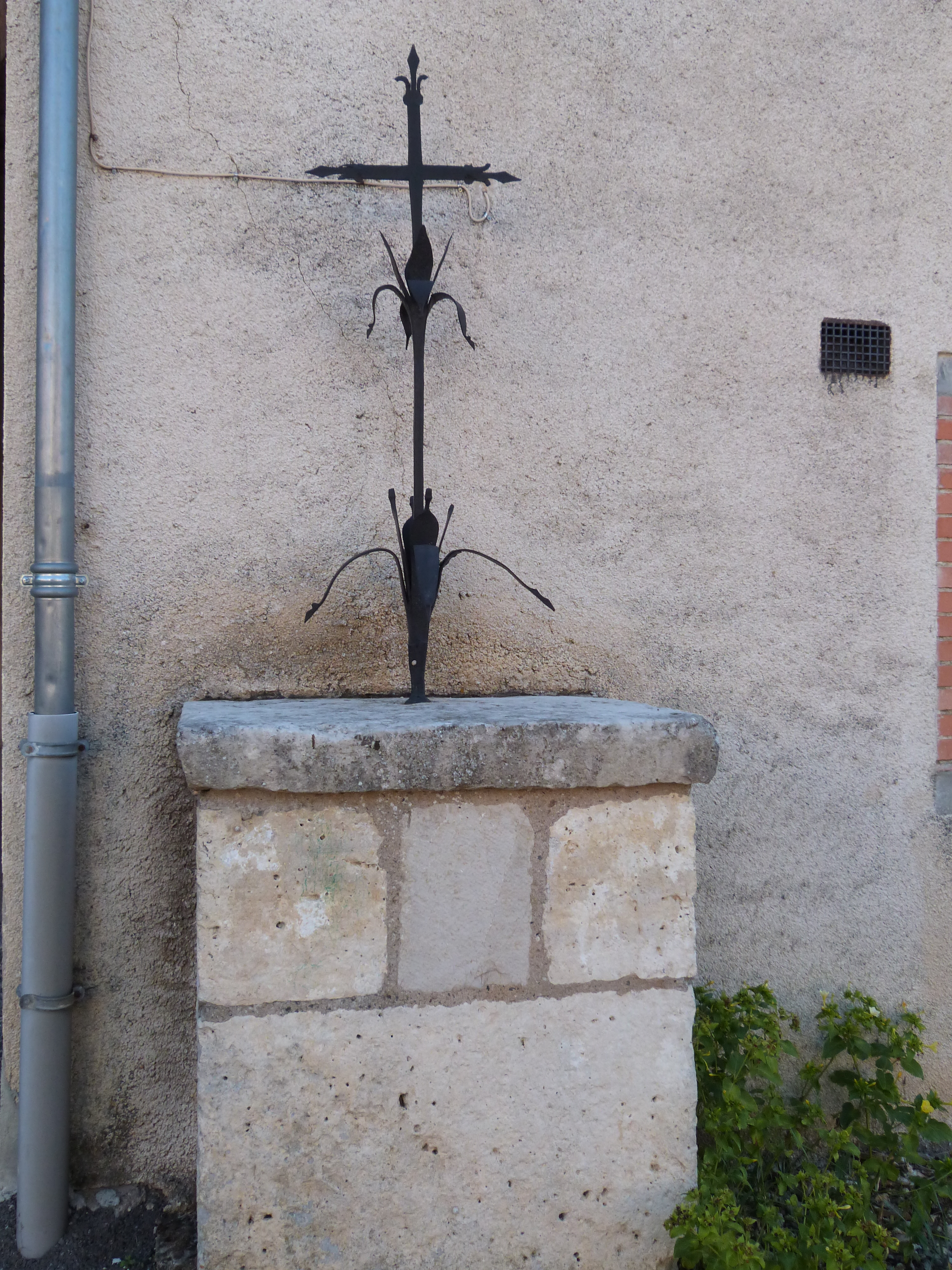
- The cross in Bournazel
- Location of Bournazel
- Location within France Location within Occitanie
- Coordinates: 44°05′34″N 1°58′09″E
- Country: France
- Region: Occitania
- Department: Tarn
- Arrondissement: Albi
- Canton: Carmaux-2 Vallée du Cérou

Government
  - Mayor (2020–2026): Jérôme Flament
- Area^{1}: 7.41 km^{2} (2.86 sq mi)
- Elevation: 325 m (1,066 ft)
- Highest elevation: 330 m (1,080 ft)
- Lowest elevation: 193 m (633 ft)
- Population (2023): 223
  - Density: 30.1/km^{2} (77.9/sq mi)
- Time zone: UTC+01:00 (CET)
  - Summer (DST): UTC+02:00 (CEST)
- INSEE/Postal code: 81035 /81170
- ^{1} French Land Register data, which excludes lakes, ponds, glaciers > 1 km^{2} (0.386 sq mi or 247 acres) and river estuaries.

Bournazel (French pronunciation: [buʁnazɛl]; Occitan: Bornasèl) is a commune in the Tarn department in southern France.

== See also ==
- Communes of the Tarn department
