= Montirat, Tarn =

Montirat
- Commune
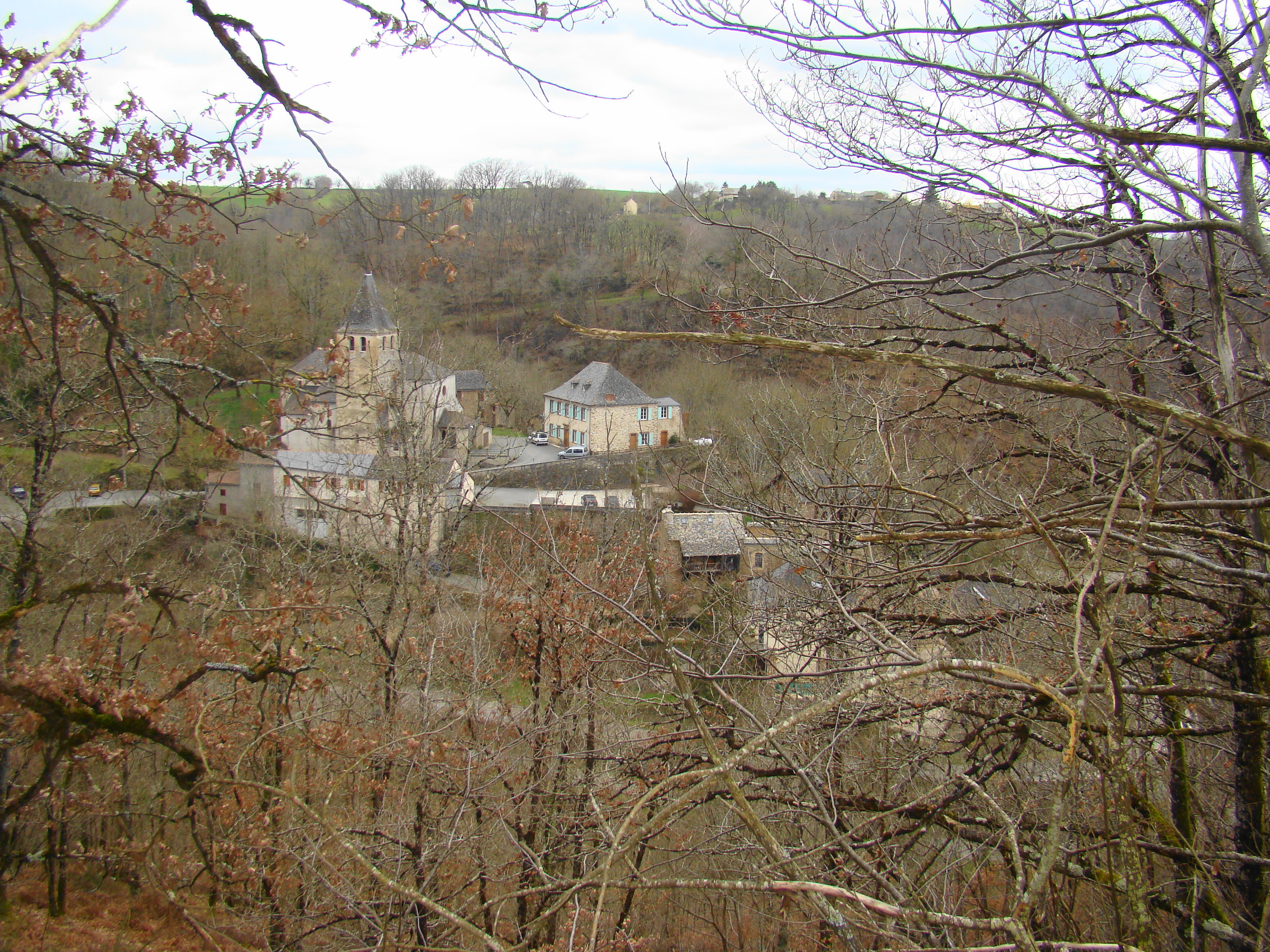
- A general view of Montirat

- Coat of arms
- Location of Montirat
- Location within France Location within Occitanie
- Coordinates: 44°09′36″N 2°06′12″E
- Country: France
- Region: Occitania
- Department: Tarn
- Arrondissement: Albi
- Canton: Carmaux-2 Vallée du Cérou
- Intercommunality: Carmausin-Ségala

Government
  - Mayor (2020–2026): Xavier Ichard
- Area^{1}: 27.78 km^{2} (10.73 sq mi)
- Elevation: 380 m (1,250 ft)
- Highest elevation: 516 m (1,693 ft)
- Lowest elevation: 170 m (560 ft)
- Population (2023): 263
  - Density: 9.47/km^{2} (24.5/sq mi)
- Time zone: UTC+01:00 (CET)
  - Summer (DST): UTC+02:00 (CEST)
- INSEE/Postal code: 81180 /81190
- ^{1} French Land Register data, which excludes lakes, ponds, glaciers > 1 km^{2} (0.386 sq mi or 247 acres) and river estuaries.

Montirat (French pronunciation: [mɔ̃tiʁa]) is a commune in the Tarn department in southern France.

== See also ==
- Communes of the Tarn department
