= Saint-Juéry, Tarn =

Saint-Juéry
- Commune
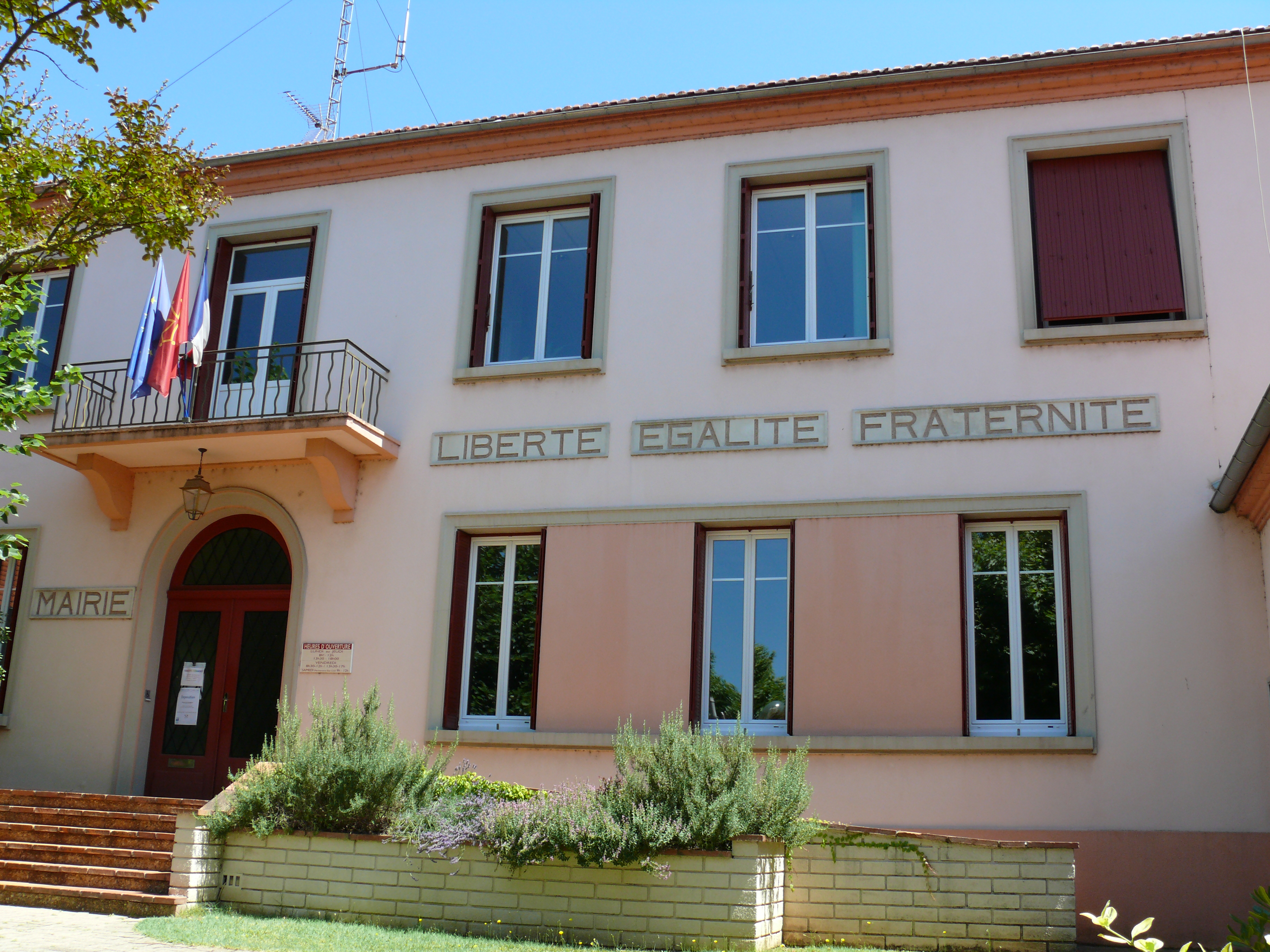
- The town hall in Saint-Juéry

- Coat of arms
- Location of Saint-Juéry
- Location within France Location within Occitanie
- Coordinates: 43°56′59″N 2°12′37″E
- Country: France
- Region: Occitania
- Department: Tarn
- Arrondissement: Albi
- Canton: Saint-Juéry
- Intercommunality: CA Albigeois

Government
  - Mayor (2020–2026): David Donnez
- Area^{1}: 9.21 km^{2} (3.56 sq mi)
- Elevation: 174 m (571 ft)
- Highest elevation: 332 m (1,089 ft)
- Lowest elevation: 157 m (515 ft)
- Population (2023): 6,564
  - Density: 713/km^{2} (1,850/sq mi)
- Time zone: UTC+01:00 (CET)
  - Summer (DST): UTC+02:00 (CEST)
- INSEE/Postal code: 81257 /81160
- ^{1} French Land Register data, which excludes lakes, ponds, glaciers > 1 km^{2} (0.386 sq mi or 247 acres) and river estuaries.

Saint-Juéry (French pronunciation: [sɛ̃ ʒɥeʁi]; Occitan: Sant Juèri) is a commune in the Tarn department in southern France. It lies adjacent to the east of Albi, the prefecture of Tarn.

== Population ==
Historical population
| Year | Pop. | ±% p.a. |
|---|---|---|
| 1968 | 5,017 | — |
| 1975 | 5,943 | +2.45% |
| 1982 | 6,738 | +1.81% |
| 1990 | 6,730 | −0.01% |
| 1999 | 6,635 | −0.16% |
| 2007 | 7,041 | +0.75% |
| 2012 | 6,715 | −0.94% |
| 2017 | 6,818 | +0.30% |
| 2023 | 6,564 | −0.63% |
Source: INSEE

== Steel industry ==
The Saut-du-Tarn Steel Works was established by Léon Talabot in Saint-Juéry in 1824 as L. Talabot & Cie. In 1881 a rolling mill hall was built with two mills. In 1882 a coke-fired blast furnace was installed for production of cast iron. The first hydroelectric power station was built in 1898, supplying electricity to the factory and the village. During the period from 1884 to 1934 many peasants came to work in the steel works from Cahuzaguet, Saint-Grégoire, Arthès, les Avalats and Marsal. Many settled in Saint-Juéry, which grew from 1,400 inhabitants in the 19th century to 7,000 inhabitants as of 2015. With the collapse of the iron and steel industry, the factory closed in 1983. As of 2015 there were still steel enterprises in the village of Saint-Juéry that employed over 250 people making hydraulic and oil valves, agricultural tools and speciality steel.

== See also ==
- Communes of the Tarn department

== Sources ==
- "Hauts-Fourneaux, Forges & Aciéries du Saut-du-Tarn", industrie.lu (in French)
- Historique (in French), AEDT: Aciers et Energies du Tarn
- MF (13 September 2015), "A Saint-Juéry, le Saut du Tarn est encore vivant", La Depeche (in French)
- Patrimoine (in French), Saint-Juéry
