= Labastide-Dénat =

- Part of Puygouzon
- Coat of arms
- Location of Labastide-Dénat
- Location within France Location within Occitanie
- Coordinates: 43°52′06″N 2°11′33″E
- Country: France
- Region: Occitania
- Department: Tarn
- Arrondissement: Albi
- Canton: Saint-Juéry
- Commune: Puygouzon
- Area^{1}: 7.43 km^{2} (2.87 sq mi)
- Elevation: 275 m (902 ft)
- Highest elevation: 333 m (1,093 ft)
- Lowest elevation: 217 m (712 ft)
- Population (2022): 424
  - Density: 57.1/km^{2} (148/sq mi)
- Time zone: UTC+01:00 (CET)
  - Summer (DST): UTC+02:00 (CEST)
- Postal code: 81120
- ^{1} French Land Register data, which excludes lakes, ponds, glaciers > 1 km^{2} (0.386 sq mi or 247 acres) and river estuaries.

Labastide-Dénat (French pronunciation: [labastid dena]; Languedocien: La Bastida de Denat) is a former commune in the Tarn department in southern France. On 1 January 2017, it was merged into the commune Puygouzon.

== See also ==
- Communes of the Tarn department
