= History of the Catholic Church in France =

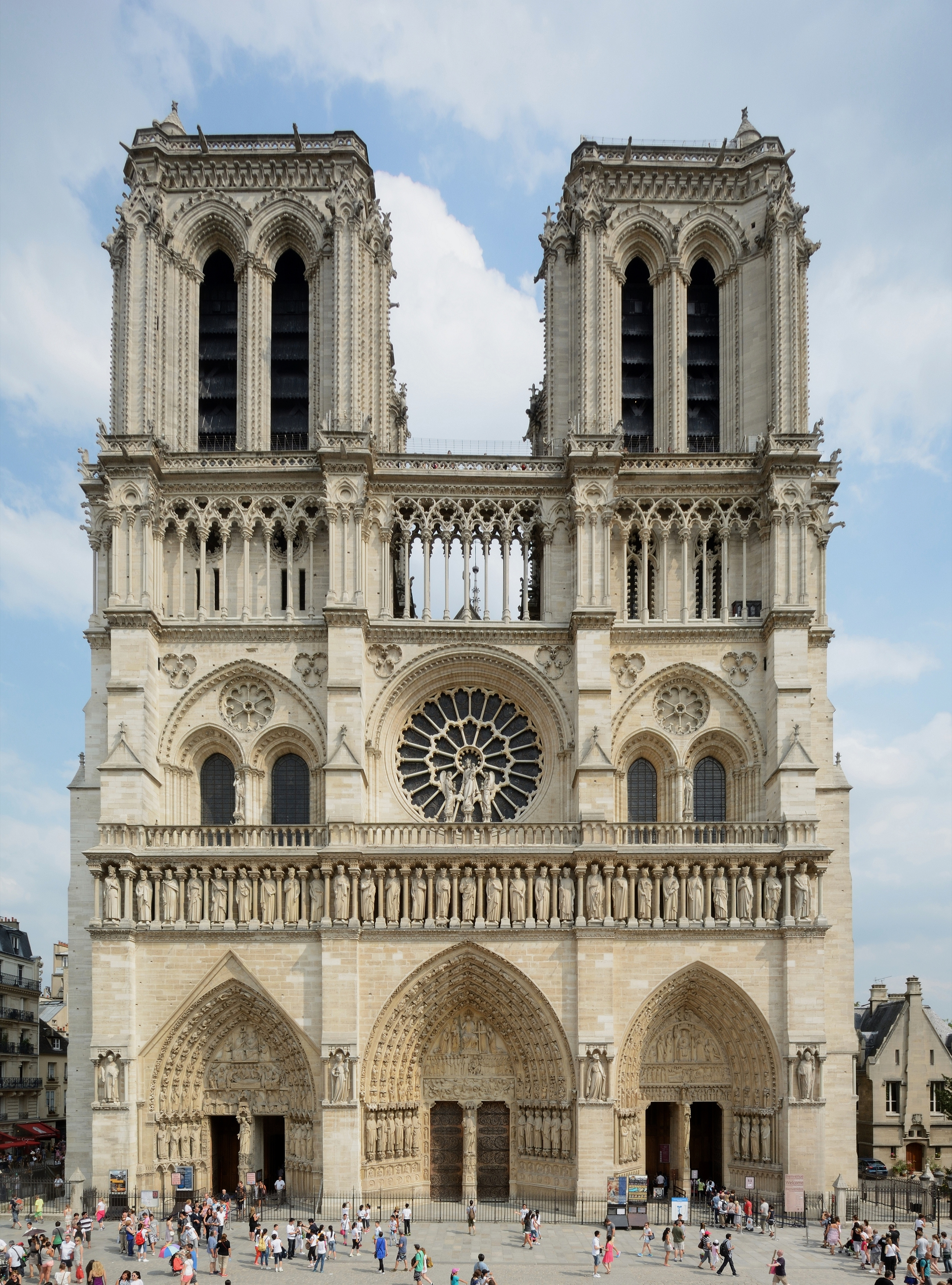
Notre-Dame de Paris

The history of the Catholic Church in France is inseparable from the history of France, and should be analyzed in its peculiar relationship with the State, with which it was progressively confused, confronted, and separated.

== Early Christianity ==
=== Legend ===
According to long-standing legend, Mary, Martha, Lazarus, and some companions, who were expelled by persecutions from the Holy Land, traversed the Mediterranean in a frail boat with neither rudder nor mast and landed at Saintes-Maries-de-la-Mer near Arles. Provençal tradition names Lazarus as the first bishop of Marseille, while Martha purportedly went on to tame the a terrible beast in nearby Tarascon. Pilgrims visited their tombs at the abbey of Vézelay in Burgundy. In the Abbey of the Trinity at Vendôme, a phylactery was said to contain a tear shed by Jesus at the tomb of Lazarus. The cathedral of Autun, not far away, is dedicated to Lazarus as Saint Lazaire.

=== History ===
The first written records of Christians in France date from the 2nd century when Irenaeus detailed the deaths of ninety-year-old bishop Pothinus of Lugdunum (Lyon) and other martyrs of the 177 persecution in Lyon.

In 496, Remigius baptized Clovis I, who was converted from paganism to Catholicism. Clovis I, considered the founder of France, made himself the ally and protector of the papacy and of his predominantly Catholic subjects.

== Foundation of Christendom in France ==
On Christmas Day 800, Pope Leo III crowned Charlemagne Emperor of the Holy Roman Empire, forming the political and religious foundations of Christendom and establishing in earnest the French government's longstanding historical association with the Roman Catholic Church.

The Treaty of Verdun (843) provided for the partition of Charlemagne's empire into 3 independent kingdoms, and one of these was France. A great churchman, Hincmar, Archbishop of Rheims (806-82), was the deviser of the new arrangement. He strongly supported the kingship of Charles the Bald, under whose sceptre he would have placed Lorraine also. To Hincmar, the dream of a united Christendom did not appear under the guise of an empire, however ideal, but under the concrete form of several unitary States, each being a member of one mighty body, the great Republic of Christendom. He would replace the empire with a Europe of which France was one member. Under Charles the Fat (880-88), it looked for a moment as though Charlemagne's empire was about to come to life again; but the illusion was temporary, and in its stead were quickly formed seven kingdoms: France, Navarre, Provence, Burgundy beyond the Jura, Lorraine, Germany, and Italy.

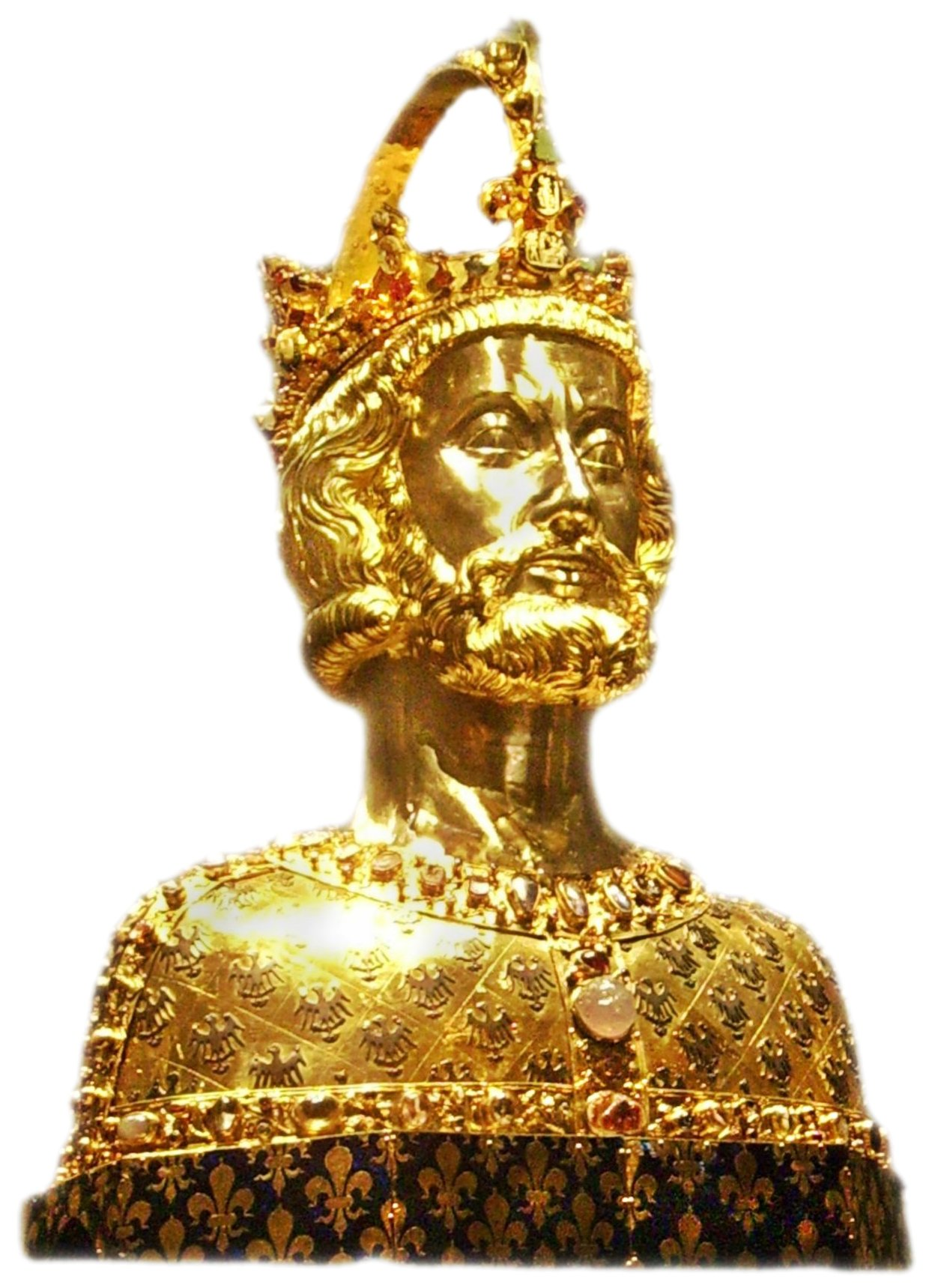
A bust of Charlemagne, key figure in the attempt of a united Christendom. Part of the treasure in Aachen.

Feudalism was the seething pot, and the imperial edifice was crumbling to dust. Towards the close of the 10th century, in the Frankish kingdom alone, there were twenty-nine provinces or fragments of provinces, under the sway of dukes, counts, or viscounts, constituted veritable sovereignties, and at the end of the 11th century, there were as many as fifty-five of these minor states, of greater or lesser importance. As early as the 10th century, one of the feudal families had begun to take the lead, that of the Dukes of Francia, descendants of Robert the Strong, and lords of all the country between the Seine and the Loire. From 887 to 987, they successfully defended French soil against the invading Northmen: the Eudes, or Odo, Duke of Francia (887-98), Robert, his brother (922-23), and Raoul or Rudolph, Robert's son-in-law (923-36), occupied the throne for a brief interval. The weakness of the later Carolingian kings was evident to all, and in 987, on the death of Louis V, Adalberon, archbishop of Rheims, at a meeting of the chief men held at Senlis, contrasted the incapacity of the Carolingian Charles of Lorraine, the heir to the throne, with the merits of Hugh, Duke of Francia. Gerbert, who afterwards became Pope Sylvester II, adviser and secretary to Adalberon, and Arnulf, bishop of Orléans, also spoke in support of Hugh, with the result that he was proclaimed king.

Thus, the Capetian dynasty had its rise in the person of Hugh Capet. It was the work of the Church, brought to pass by the influence of the See of Reims, renowned throughout France since the episcopate of Hincmar, renowned since the days of Clovis for the privilege of anointing the Frankish kings conferred on its titular, and renowned so opportunely at this time for the learning of its episcopal school presided over by Gerbert himself.

The Church, which had set up the new dynasty, exercised a very salutary influence over French social life. It has been recently proven by the literary efforts of M. Bédier that the origin and growth of the "Chansons de geste", i.e., of early epic literature, are closely bound up with the famous pilgrimage shrines, whither the piety of the people resorted. And military courage and physical heroism were schooled and blessed by the Church, which in the early part of the 11th century transformed chivalry from a lay institution of German origin into a religious one by placing among its liturgical rites the ceremony of knighthood, in which the candidate promised to defend truth, justice, and the oppressed. Founded in 910, the Congregation of Cluny, which made rapid progress in the 11th century, prepared France to play an important part in the reformation of the Church undertaken in the second half of the 11th century by a monk of Cluny, Gregory VII, and gave the Church two other popes after him, Urban II and Pascal II. It was a Frenchman, Urban II, who at the Council of Claremont (1095) initiated the Crusades which spread widely throughout Christendom.

== Time of the Crusades ==
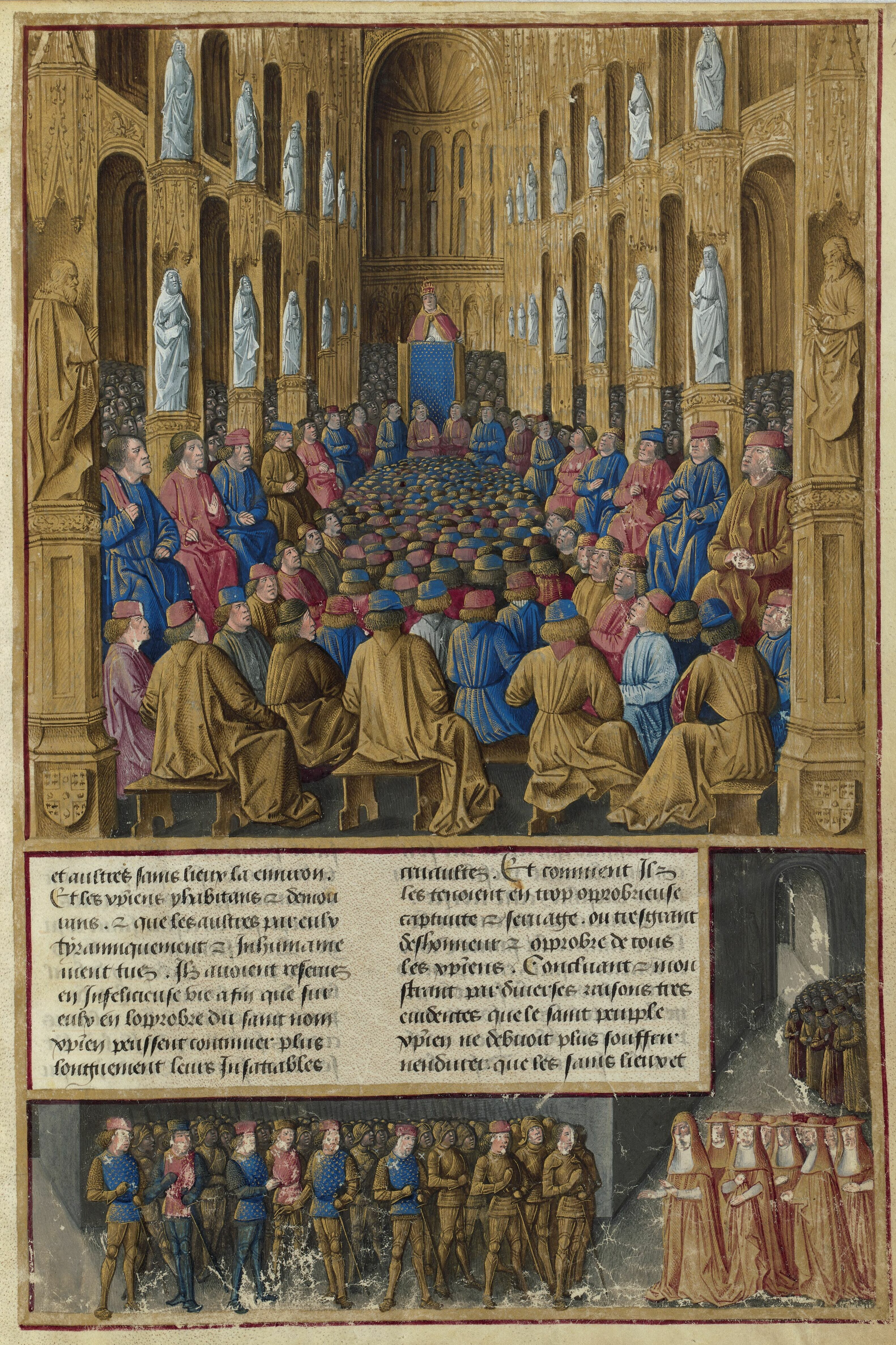
Pope Urban II at the Council of Clermont, given a late Gothic setting in this illumination from the Livre des Passages d'Outre-mer, of c. 1490 (Bibliothèque nationale).

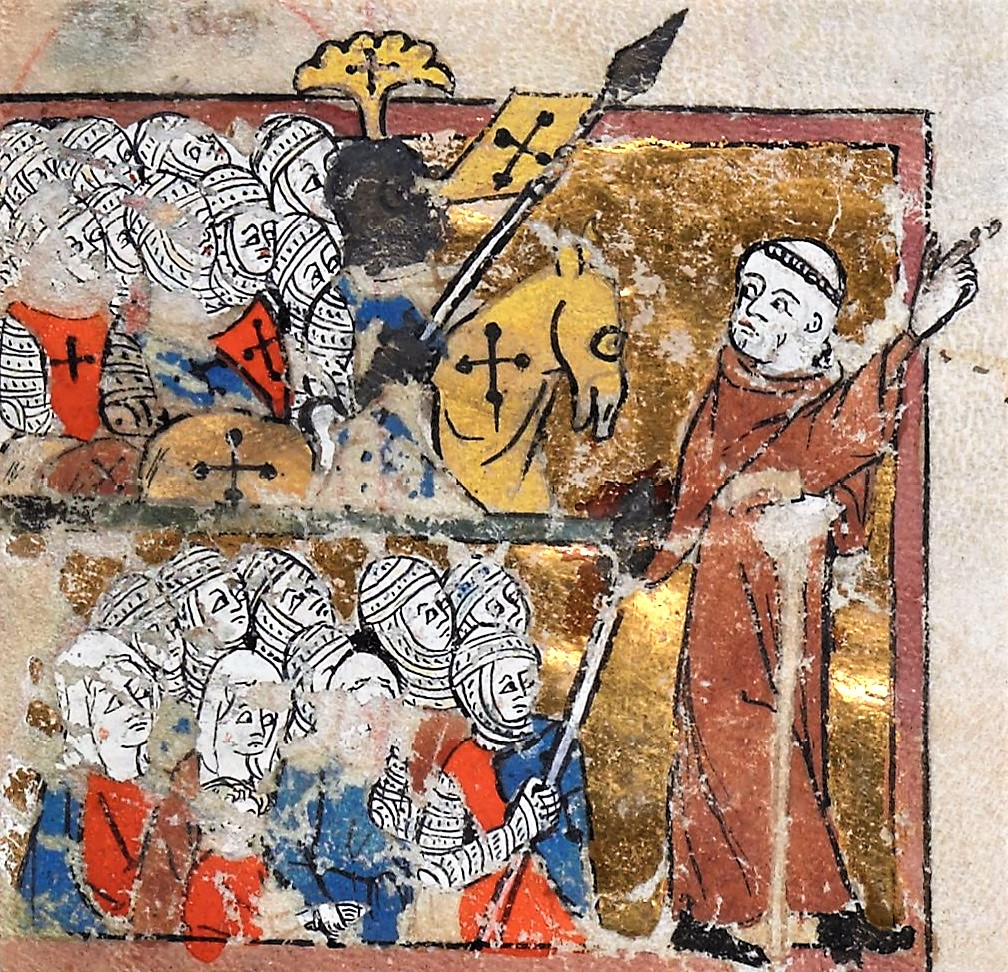
A medieval image of Peter the Hermit leading knights, soldiers and women toward Jerusalem during the First Crusade.

"The reign of Louis VI (1108-37) is of note in the history of the Church, and in that of France; in the one because the solemn adhesion of Louis VI to Innocent II assured the unity of the Church, which at the time was seriously menaced by the Antipope Anacletus II; in the other because for the first time Capetian kings took a stand as champions of law and order against the feudal system and as the protectors of public rights.

A churchman, Suger, abbot of St-Denis, a friend of Louis VI and minister of Louis VII (1137-80), developed and realized this ideal of kingly duty. Louis VI, seconded by Suger and counting on the support of the towns – the "communes" they were called when they had obliged the feudal lords to grant them charters of freedom – fulfilled to the letter the rôle of prince as it was conceived by the theology of the Middle Ages. "Kings have long arms," wrote Suger, "and it is their duty to repress with all their might, and by right of their office, the daring of those who rend the State by endless war, who rejoice in pillage, and who destroy homesteads and churches." Another French churchman, St. Bernard, won Louis VII for the Crusades; and it was not his fault that Palestine, where the First Crusade had set up a Latin kingdom, did not remain a French colony in the service of the Church. The divorce of Louis VII and Eleanor of Aquitaine (1152) marred the ascendancy of French influence by paving the way for the growth of Anglo-Norman pretensions on the soil of France from the Channel to the Pyrenees. Soon, however, by virtue of feudal laws the French king, Philip Augustus (1180–1223), proclaimed himself suzerain over Richard Cœur de Lion and John Lackland, and the victory of Bouvines which he gained over the Emperor Otto IV, backed by a coalition of feudal nobles (1214), was the first ever in French history which called forth a movement of national solidarity around a French king. The war against the Albigensians under Louis VIII (1223–26) brought in its train the establishment of the influence and authority of the French monarchy in the south of France.

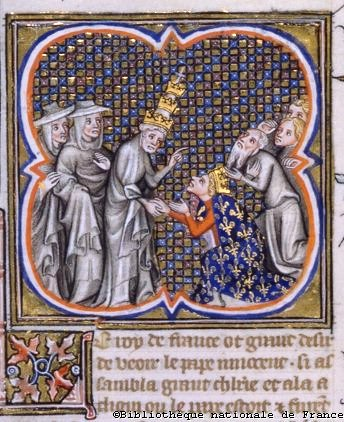
Pope Innocent IV with Louis IX at Cluny.

St. Louis IX (1226–1270), "ruisselant de piété, et enflammé de charité", as a contemporary describes him, made kings so beloved that from that time dates the royal cult, so to speak, which was one of the moral forces in olden France, and which existed in no other country of Europe to the same degree. Piety had been for the kings of France, set on their thrones by the Church of God, as it were a duty belonging to their charge or office; but in the piety of St. Louis, there was a note all his own, the note of sanctity. With him ended the Crusades, but not their spirit. During the 13th and 14th centuries, project after project attempting to set on foot a crusade was made, showing that the spirit of a militant apostolate continued to ferment in the soul of France. The project of Charles Valois (1308–09), the French expedition under Peter I of Cyprus against Alexandria and the Armenian coasts (1365–67), sung of by the French trouvère, Guillaume Machault, the crusade of John of Nevers, which ended in the bloody battle of Nicopolis (1396) – in all these enterprises, the spirit of St. Louis lived, just as in the heart of the Christians of the East, whom France was thus trying to protect, there has survived a lasting gratitude toward the nation of St. Louis. In the days of St. Louis, the influence of the French epic literature in Europe was supreme. Brunetto Latini, as early as the middle of the 13th century, wrote that, "of all speech [parlures] that of the French was the most charming, and the most in favour with everyone." French held sway in England until the middle of the 14th century; it was fluently spoken at the Court of Constantinople at the time of the Fourth Crusade, and in Greece in the dukedoms, principalities, and baronies founded there by the House of Burgundy and Champagne. And it was in French that Rusticiano of Pisa, about 1300, wrote the record of Marco Polo's travels. The University of Paris was saved from a spirit of exclusiveness by the happy intervention of Alexander IV, who obliged it to open its chairs to the mendicant friars. Among its professors were Duns Scotus, the Italians, St. Thomas and St. Bonaventure; Albert the Great, a German; and Alexander of Hales, an Englishman. Among its pupils it counted Roger Bacon, Dante, Raimundus Lullus, Popes Gregory IX, Urban IV, Clement IV, and Boniface VIII.

== Advent of Gothic art and the Hundred Years' War ==
France was the birthplace of Gothic art, which was carried by French architects into Germany. The method employed in the building of many Gothic cathedrals – i.e., by the actual assistance of the faithful – bears witness to the fact that at this period the lives of the French people were deeply penetrated with faith. An architectural wonder such as the cathedral of Chartres was in reality the work of popular art born of the faith of the people who worshipped there.

=== "Divine right" and the weakening of the influence of the papacy in Christendom ===
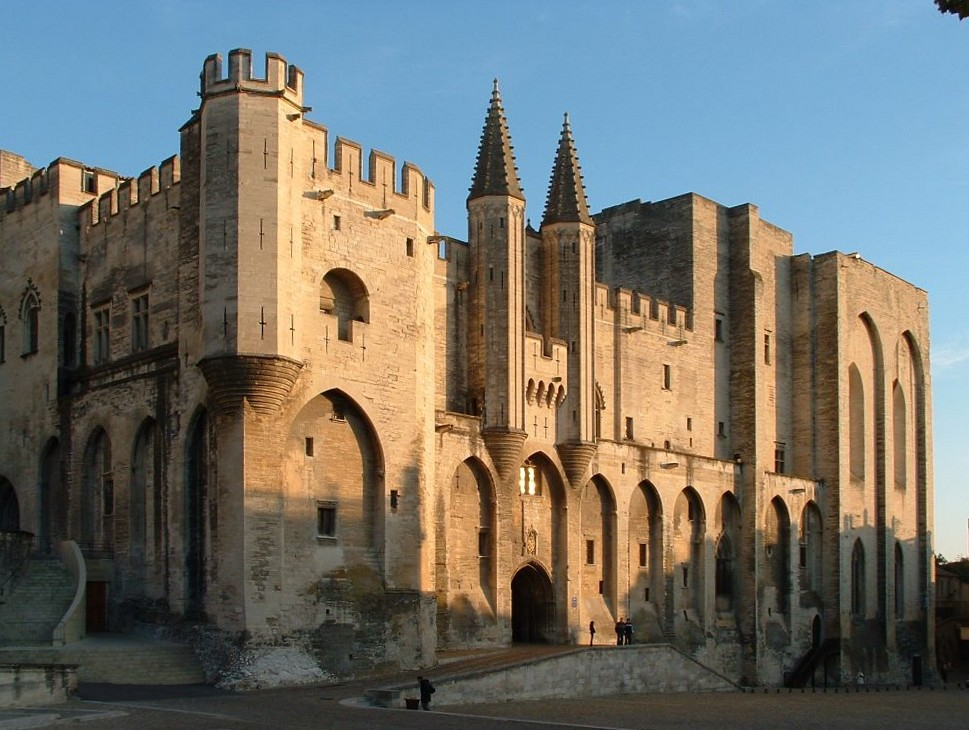
The Papal palace in Avignon.

"Under Philip IV, the Fair (1285–1314), the royal house of France became very powerful. By means of alliances, he extended his prestige as far as the Orient. His brother Charles of Valois married Catherine de Courtney, an heiress of the Latin Empire of Constantinople. The Kings of England and Minorca were his vassals, the King of Scotland his ally, the Kings of Naples and Hungary his connections by marriage. He aimed at a sort of supremacy over the body politic of Europe. Pierre Dubois, his jurisconsult, dreamed that the pope would hand over all his domains to Philip and receive in exchange an annual income, while Philip would thus have the spiritual head of Christendom under his influence. Philip IV laboured to increase the royal prerogative and thereby the national unity of France. By sending magistrates into feudal territories and by defining certain cases (cas royaux) as reserved to the king's competency, he dealt a heavy blow to the feudalism of the Middle Ages. But on the other hand, under his rule, many anti-Christian maxims began to creep into law and politics. Roman law was slowly reintroduced into social organization, and gradually the idea of a united Christendom disappeared from the national policy. Philip the Fair, pretending to rule by Divine right, gave it to be understood that he rendered an account of his kingship to no one under heaven. He denied the pope's right to represent, as the papacy had always done in the past, the claims of morality and justice where kings were concerned. Hence arose in 1294-1303 his struggle with Pope Boniface VIII, but in that struggle, he was cunning enough to secure the support of the States-General, which represented public opinion in France. In later times, after centuries of monarchical government, this same public opinion rose against the abuse of power committed by its kings in the name of their pretended divine right, and thus made an implicit amende honorable to what the Church had taught concerning the origin, the limits, and the responsibility of all power, which had been forgotten or misinterpreted by the lawyers of Philip IV when they set up their independent State as the absolute source of power. The election of Pope Clement V (1305) under Philip's influence, the removal of the papacy to Avignon, the nomination of seven French popes in succession, weakened the influence of the papacy in Christendom, though it has recently come to light that the Avignon popes did not always allow the independence of the Holy See to waver or disappear in the game of politics. Philip IV and his successors may have had the illusion that they were taking the place of the German emperors in European affairs. The papacy was imprisoned on their territory; the German empire was passing through a crisis, was, in fact, decaying, and the kings of France might well imagine themselves temporal vicars of God, side by side with, or even in opposition to, the spiritual vicar who lived at Avignon."

=== Hundred Years' War, Joan of Arc and the Rex Christianissimus ===
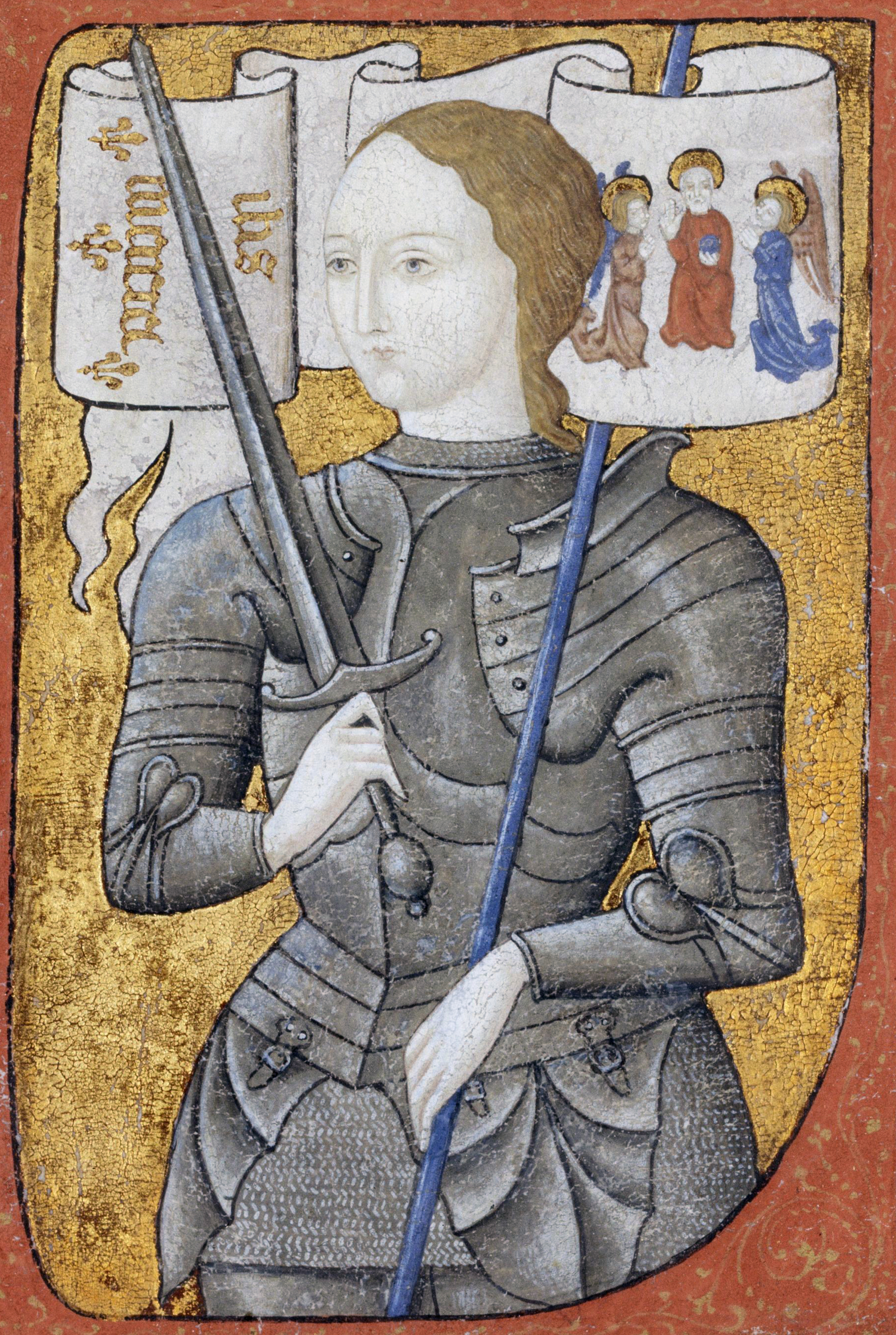
Painting, c. 1485. Artist's interpretation; the only portrait for which Joan of Arc is known to have sat has not survived. (Centre Historique des Archives Nationales, Paris, AE II 2490)

But at this juncture, the Hundred Years' War broke out, and the French kingdom, which aspired to be the arbiter of Christendom, was menaced in its very existence by England. English kings aimed at the French crown, and the two nations fought for the possession of Guienne. Twice during the war was the independence of France imperilled. Defeated at the Ecluse (1340), at Crécy (1346), and at Poitiers (1356), France was saved by Charles V (1364-80) and by Duguesclin, only to suffer French defeat under Charles VI at Agincourt (1415) and to be ceded by the Treaty of Troyes to Henry V, King of England. At this darkest hour of the monarchy, the nation itself was stirred. The revolutionary attempt by Etienne Marcel (1358) and the revolt that gave rise to the Ordonnace Cabochienne (1418) were the earliest signs of popular impatience at the absolutism of the French kings. Still, internal dissensions hindered an effective patriotic defence of the country. When Charles VII came to the throne, France had almost ceased to be French. The king and court lived beyond the Loire, and Paris was the seat of an English government. Saint Joan of Arc was the saviour of French nationality as well as French royalty, and at the end of Charles' reign (1422-61), Calais was the only spot in France in the hands of the English.

The ideal of a united Christendom continued to haunt the soul of France, despite the predominating influence that gradually assumed in French politics by purely national aspirations. From the reign of Charles VI, or even the last years of Charles V, dates the custom of giving to French kings the exclusive title of Rex Christianissimus. Pepin the Short and Charlemagne had been proclaimed "Most Christian" by the popes of their day. Alexander III had conferred the same title on Louis VII, but from Charles VI onwards, the title came into constant use as the special prerogative of the kings of France. Philippe de Mézières, a contemporary of Charles VI, wrote: "Because of the vigour with which Charlemagne, St. Louis, and other brave French kings, more than the other kings of Christendom, have upheld the Catholic Faith, the kings of France are known among the kings of Christendom as 'Most Christian.'"

In later times, Emperor Frederick III, addressing Charles VII, wrote: "Your ancestors have won for your name the title Most Christian, as a heritage not to be separated from it." From the pontificate of Paul II (1464), the popes, in addressing bulls to the kings of France, always use the style and title Rex Christianissimus. Furthermore, European public opinion always regarded St. Joan of Arc, who saved the French monarchy, as the heroine of Christendom and believed that the Maid of Orléans intended to lead the king of France on another crusade once she had secured him in the peaceful possession of his own country. France's national heroine was thus heralded by the fancy of her contemporaries, by Christine de Pizan, and by that Venetian merchant whose letters have been preserved for us in the Morosini Chronicle as a heroine whose aims were as wide as Christianity itself.

=== Rise of "gallicanism" ===
The 15th century, during which France was growing in national spirit, and while men's minds were still conscious of the claims of Christendom on their country, was also the century during which, on the morrow of the Great Schism and of the Councils of Basel and of Constance, there began a movement among the powerful feudal bishops against pope and king, and which aimed at the emancipation of the Gallican Church. The propositions upheld by Gerson, and forced by him, as representing the University of Paris, on the Council of Constance, would have set up in the Church an aristocratic regime analogous to what the feudal lords, profiting by the weakness of Charles VI, had dreamed of establishing in the State. A royal proclamation in 1418, issued after the election of Martin V, maintained in opposition to the pope "all the privileges and franchises of the kingdom", put an end to the custom of annates, limited the rights of the Roman court in collecting benefices, and forbade the sending to Rome of articles of gold or silver. This proposition was assented to by the young King Charles VII in 1423, but at the same time he sent Pope Martin V an embassy asking to be absolved from the oath he had taken to uphold the principles of the Gallican Church and seeking to arrange a concordat which would give the French king a right of patronage over 500 benefices in his kingdom. This was the beginning of the practice adopted by French kings of arranging the government of the Church directly with the popes over the heads of the bishops. Charles VII, whose struggle with England had left his authority still very precarious, was constrained, in 1438, during the Council of Basel, to appease the powerful prelates of the Assembly of Bourges, to promulgate the Pragmatic Sanction, thereby asserting in France those maxims of the Council of Basel which Pope Eugene had condemned. But straightway he bethought him of a concordat, and overtures in this sense were made to Eugene IV. Eugene replied that he well knew that the Pragmatic Sanction – "that odious act" – was not the king's own free doing, and a concordat was discussed between them. Louis XI (1461–83), whose domestic policy aimed at ending or weakening the new feudalism which had grown up during two centuries through the custom of presenting appanages to the brothers of the king, extended to the feudal bishops the ill will he professed toward the feudal lords. He detested the Pragmatic Sanction as an act that strengthened ecclesiastical feudalism, and on 27 November 1461, he announced to the pope its suppression. At the same time, he pleaded, as the demand of his Parliament, that for the future the pope should permit the collation of ecclesiastical benefices to be made either wholly or in part through the civil power. The Concordat of 1472 obtained from Rome very material concessions in this respect. At this time, besides "episcopal Gallicanism", against which pope and king were working together, we may trace, in the writings of the lawyers of the closing years of the 15th century, the beginnings of a "royal Gallicanism" which taught that in France the State should govern the Church.

== Renaissance ==
=== Rivalry with "warrior popes" ===
"The Italian wars undertaken by Charles VIII (1493–98) and continued by Louis XII (1498–1515), aided by an excellent corps of artillery and all the resources of French furia, to assert certain French claims over Naples and Milan, did not quite fulfill the dreams of the French kings. They had, however, a threefold result in the worlds of politics, religion, and art:

- politically, they led foreign powers to believe that France was a menace to the balance of power, and hence aroused alliances to maintain that balance, such, for instance, as the League of Venice (1495), and the Holy League (1511–12);
- from the point of view of art, they carried a breath of the Renaissance across the Alps;
- In the religious world, they furnished France an opportunity on Italian soil of asserting for the first time the principles of royal Gallicanism.

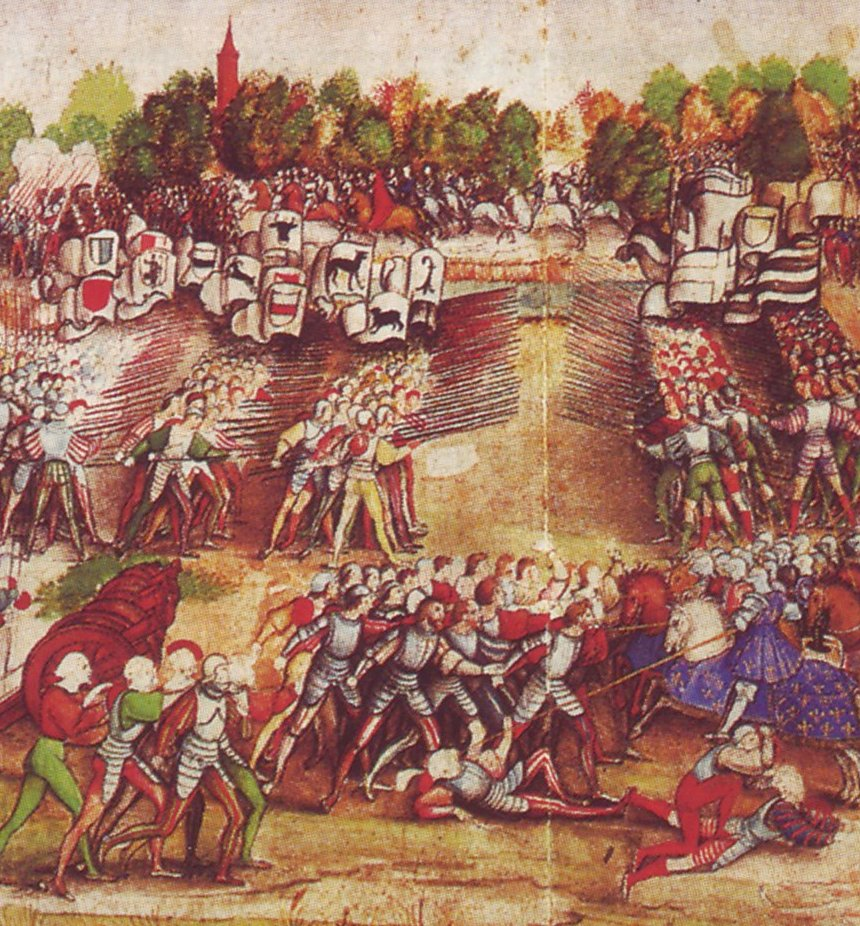
Detail from a painting attributed to the Maître de la Ratière of the battle of Marignano

Louis XII and the emperor Maximilian, supported by the opponents of Pope Julius II, convened in Pisa a council that threatened the rights of the Holy See. Matters looked very serious. The understanding between the pope and the French kings hung in the balance. Leo X understood the danger when the battle of Marignano opened to Francis I the road to Rome. The pope, in alarm, retired to Bologna, and the Concordat of 1516, negotiated between the cardinals and Duprat, the chancellor, and afterwards approved of by the Ecumenical Council of the Lateran, recognized the right of the King of France to nominate not only to 500 ecclesiastical benefices, as Charles VII had requested, but to all the benefices in his kingdom. It was a fair gift indeed. But if in matters temporal the bishops were thus in the king's hands, their institution in matters spiritual was reserved to the pope. Pope and king, by common agreement, thus put an end to an episcopal aristocracy such as the Gallicans of the great councils had dreamed of. The concordat between Leo X and Francis I was tantamount to a solemn repudiation of all the anti-Roman work of the great councils of the 15th century. The conclusion of this concordat was one of the reasons why France escaped the Reformation. From the moment that the disposal of church property, as laid down by the concordat, belonged to the civil power, royalty had nothing to gain from the Reformation. Whereas the kings of England and the German princelings saw in the reformation a chance to gain possession of ecclesiastical property, the kings of France, thanks to the concordat, were already in legal possession of those much-envied goods."

=== Struggle with the House of Austria ===
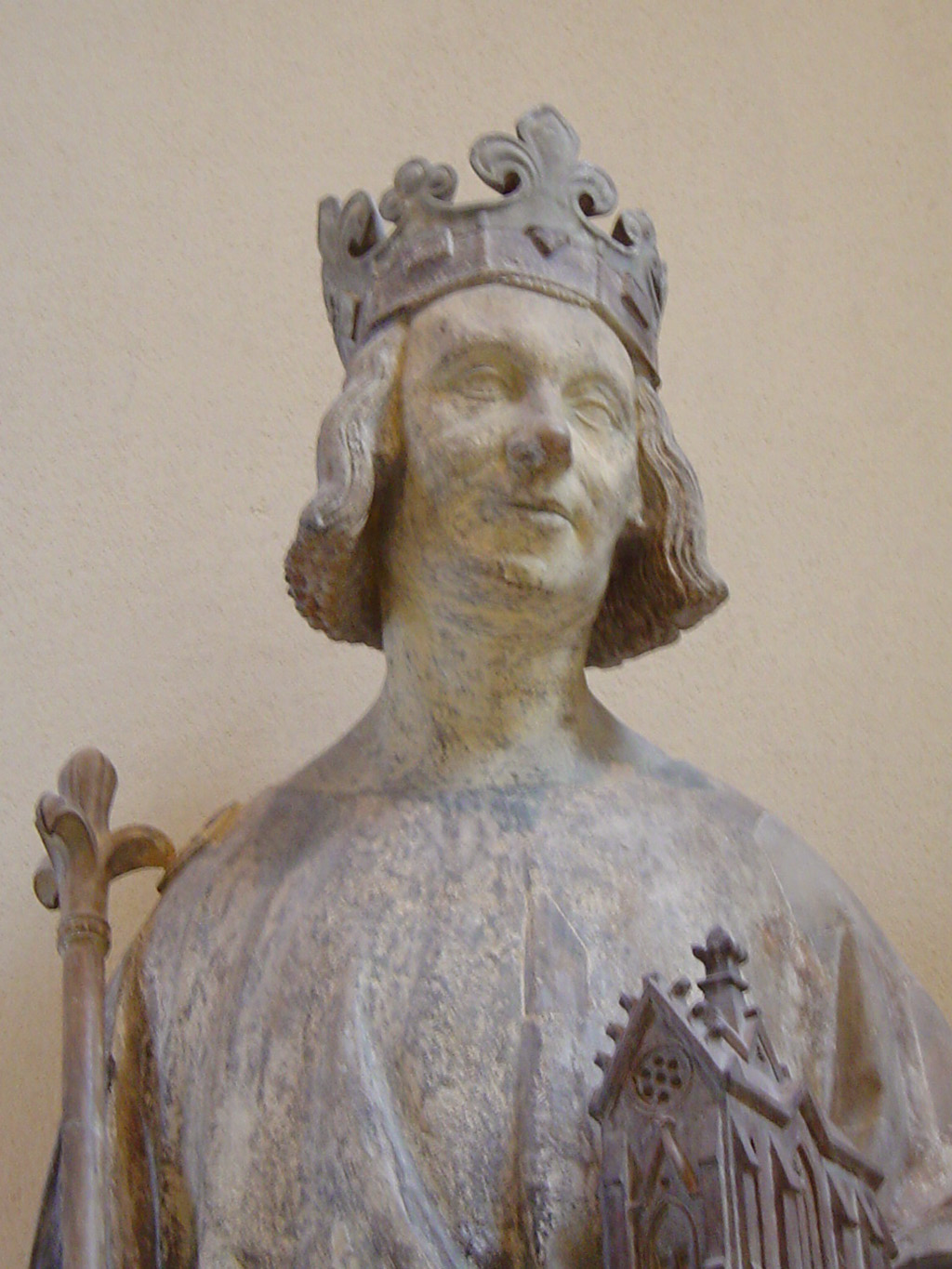
Statue of Charles V of France

"When Charles V became King of Spain (1516) and emperor (1519), thus uniting in his person the hereditary possessions of the House of Austria and German as well as the old domains of the House of Burgundy – uniting moreover the Spanish monarchy with Naples, Sicily, Sardinia, the northern part of Africa, and certain lands in America, Francis I inaugurated a struggle between France and the House of Austria. After forty-four years of war, from the victory of Marignano to the treaty of Cateau-Cambrésis (1515-59), France relinquished hopes of retaining possession of Italy, but wrested the Bishoprics of Metz, Toul, and Verdun from the empire and had won back possession of Calais. The Spaniards were left in possession of Naples and the country around Milan, and their influence predominated throughout the Italian Peninsula. But the dream which Charles V had for a brief moment entertained of a worldwide empire had been shattered.

During this struggle against the House of Austria, France, for motives of political and military exigency, had been obliged to lean towards the Lutherans of Germany, and even on the sultan. The foreign policy of France since the time of Francis I had been to seek the good of the nation exclusively and no longer to be guided by the interests of Catholicism at large. The France of the Crusades even became the ally of the sultan. But, by a strange anomaly, this new political grouping allowed France to continue its protection of the Christians of the East. In the Middle Ages, it protected them by force of arms, but since the 16th century, by treaties called capitulations, the first of which was drawn up in 1535. The spirit of French policy has changed, but it was always on France that the Christian communities of the East rely, and this protectorate continued to exist under the Third Republic, and later with the protectorates of the Middle East."

== Wars of Religion ==
=== Appearance of Lutheranism and Calvinism ===
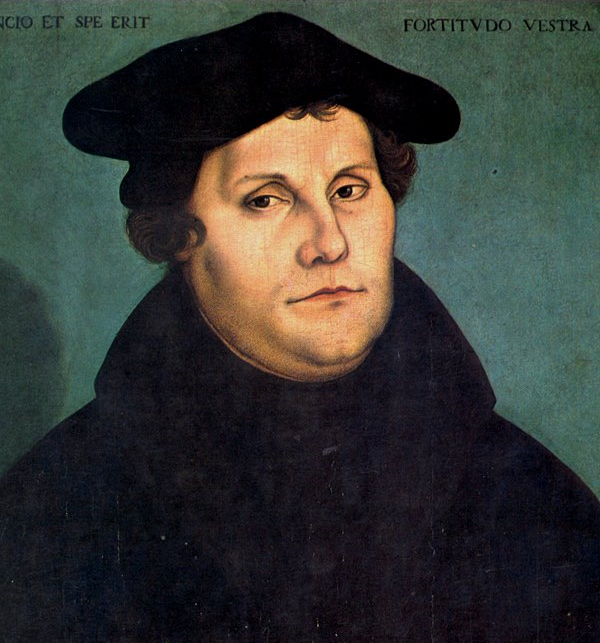
Luther in 1529 by Lucas Cranach.

"The early part of the 16th century was marked by the growth of Protestantism in France, under the forms of Lutheranism and of Calvinism. Lutheranism was the first to make its entry. The minds of some in France were already prepared to receive it. Six years before Luther's time, the archbishop Lefebvre of Etaples (Faber Stapulensis), a protégé of Louis XII and of Francis I, had preached the necessity of reading the scriptures and of "bringing back religion to its primitive purity". A certain number of tradesmen, some of whom, for business reasons, had travelled in Germany, and a few priests, were infatuated with Lutheran ideas. Until 1534, Francis I was almost favourable to the Lutherans, and he even proposed to make Melanchthon President of the Collège de France."

=== Beginning of the persecutions ===
However, "on learning, in 1534, that violent placards against the Church of Rome had been posted on the same day in many of the large towns, and even near the king's own room in the Château d'Amboise, he feared a Lutheran plot; an inquiry was ordered, and seven Lutherans were condemned to death and burned at the stake in Paris. Eminent ecclesiastics like du Bellay, Archbishop of Paris, and Sadolet, Bishop of Carpentras, deplored these executions and the Valdois massacre ordered by d'Oppède, President of the Parliament of Aix, in 1545. Laymen, on the other hand, who ill understood the Christian gentleness of these prelates, reproached them with being slow and remiss in putting down heresy; and when, under Henry II, Calvinism crept in from Geneva, a policy of persecution was inaugurated. From 1547 to 1550, in less than three years, the chambre ardente, a committee of the Parliament of Paris, condemned more than 500 persons to retract their beliefs, to imprisonment, or to death at the stake. Notwithstanding this, the Calvinists, in 1555, were able to organize themselves into Churches on the plan of that at Geneva; and, to bind these Churches more closely together, they held a synod in Paris in 1559. There were in France at that time seventy-two Reformed Churches; two years later, in 1561, the number had increased to 2000. The methods, too, of the Calvinist propaganda had changed. The earlier Calvinists, like the Lutherans, had been artists and workingmen, but in the course of time, in the South and in the West, several princes and noblemen joined their ranks. Among these were two princes of the blood, descendants of St. Louis: Anthony of Bourbon, who became King of Navarre through his marriage with Jeanne d'Albret, and his brother, the Prince de Condé. Another name of note is that of Admiral de Coligny, nephew of that duke of Montmorency who was the Premier Baron of Christendom. Thus it came to pass that in France Calvinism was no longer a religious force, but had become a political and military cabal."

=== Massacre of St. Bartholomew ===
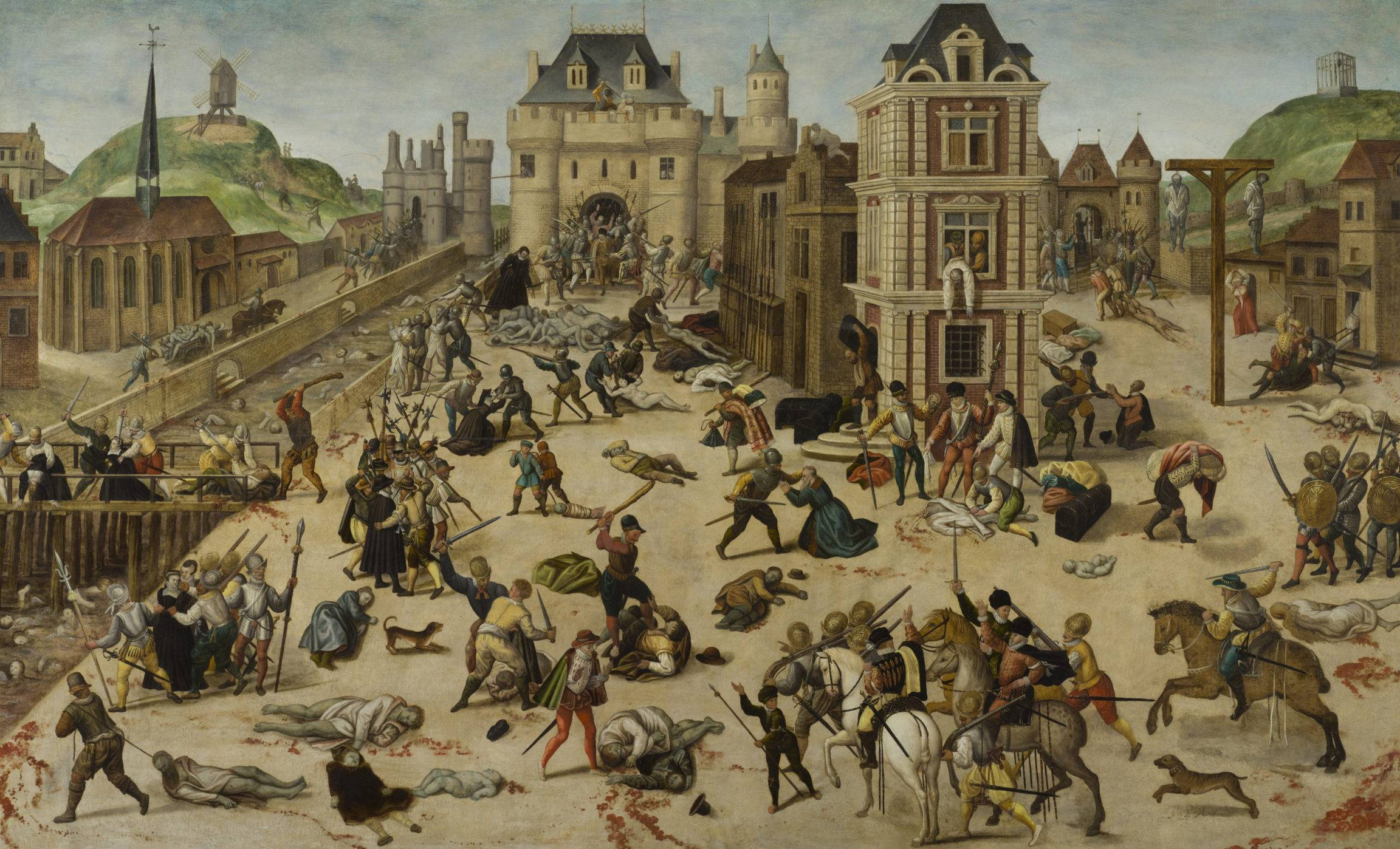
Painting by François Dubois, a Huguenot painter, born about 1529 in Amiens who settled in Switzerland. Although Dubois did not witness the massacre, he depicts Coligny's body hanging out of a window at the rear to the right. To the left rear, Catherine de' Medici is shown emerging from the Louvre to inspect a heap of bodies.

"Such was the beginning of the Wars of Religion. They had for their starting-point the conspiracy of Amboise (1560) by which the Protestant leaders aimed at seizing the person of Francis II, to remove him from the influence of Francis of Guise. During the reigns of Francis II, Charles IX, and Henry III, a powerful influence was exercised by the queen-mother, who made use of the conflicts between the opposing religious factions to establish more securely the power of her sons. In 1561, Catherine de' Medici arranged for the Poissy discussion to try to bring about an understanding between the two creeds, but during the Wars of religion she ever maintained an equivocal attitude between both parties, favouring now the one and now the other, until the time came when, fearing that Charles IX would shake himself free of her influence, she took a large share of responsibility in the odious massacre of St. Bartholomew. There were eight of these wars in the space of thirty years. The first was started by a massacre of Calvinists at Vassy by the troopers of Guise (1 March 1562), and straightway both parties appealed for foreign aid. Catharine, who was at this time working in the Catholic cause, turned to Spain; Coligny and Condé turned to Elizabeth of England and turned over to her the port of Havre. Thus, from the beginning were foreshadowed the lines which the Wars of Religion would follow. They opened up France to the interference of such foreign princes as Elizabeth and Philip II, and to the plunder of foreign soldiers, such as those of the Duke of Alba and the German troopers (Reiter) called in by the Protestants. One after another, these wars ended in weak provisional treaties which did not last. Under the banners of the Reformation party or those of the League organized by the House of Guise to defend Catholicism, political opinions ranged themselves, and during these thirty years of civil disorder, monarchical centralization was often in trouble of overthrow. Had the Guise party prevailed, the trend of policy adopted by the French monarchy towards Catholicism after the Concordat of Francis I would have been assuredly less Gallican. That concordat had placed the Church of France and its episcopate in the hands of the king. The old episcopal Gallicanism, which held that the authority of the pope was not above that of the Church assembled in council, and the royal Gallicanism, which held that the king had no superior on earth, not even the pope, were now allied against the papal monarchy strengthened by the Council of Trent. The consequence of all this was that the French kings refused to allow the decisions of that council to be published in France, and this refusal has never been withdrawn.

=== Edict of Nantes and the defeat of Protestantism ===
"At the end of the 16th century, it seemed for an instant as though the home party of France was to shake off the yoke of Gallican opinions. Feudalism had been broken; the people were eager for liberty; the Catholics, disheartened by the corruption of the Valois court, contemplated elevating to the throne, in succession to Henry II, who was childless, a member of the powerful House of Guise. In fact, the League had asked the Holy See to grant the wish of the people and give France a Guise as king. Henry of Navarre, the heir presumptive to the throne, was a Protestant; Sixtus V had given him the choice of remaining a Protestant and never reigning in France or of abjuring his heresy, receiving absolution from the pope himself, and, together with it, the throne of France. But there was a third solution possible, and the French episcopate foresaw it, namely that the abjuration should be made not to the pope but to the French bishops. Gallican susceptibilities would thus be satisfied, dogmatic orthodoxy would be maintained on the French throne, and it would do away with the danger to which the unity of France was exposed by the proneness of a certain number of Leaguers to encourage the intervention of Spanish armies and the ambitions of the Spanish king, Philip II, who cherished the idea of setting his own daughter in the throne of France.

The abjuration of Henry IV made to the French bishops (25 July 1593) was a victory of Catholicism over Protestantism, but it was the victory of episcopal Gallicanism over the spirit of the League. Canonically, the absolution given by the bishops to Henry IV was unavailing, since the pope alone could lawfully give it; but politically, that absolution was bound to have a decisive effect. From the day that Henry IV became a Catholic, the League was beaten. Two French prelates went to Rome to crave absolution for Henry. Philip Neri ordered Baronius smiling, no doubt, as he did so, to tell the pope, whose confessor he was, Baronius, that he himself could not have absolution until he had absolved the King of France. And on 17 September 1595, the Holy See solemnly absolved Henry IV, thereby sealing the reconciliation between the French monarchy and the Church of Rome.

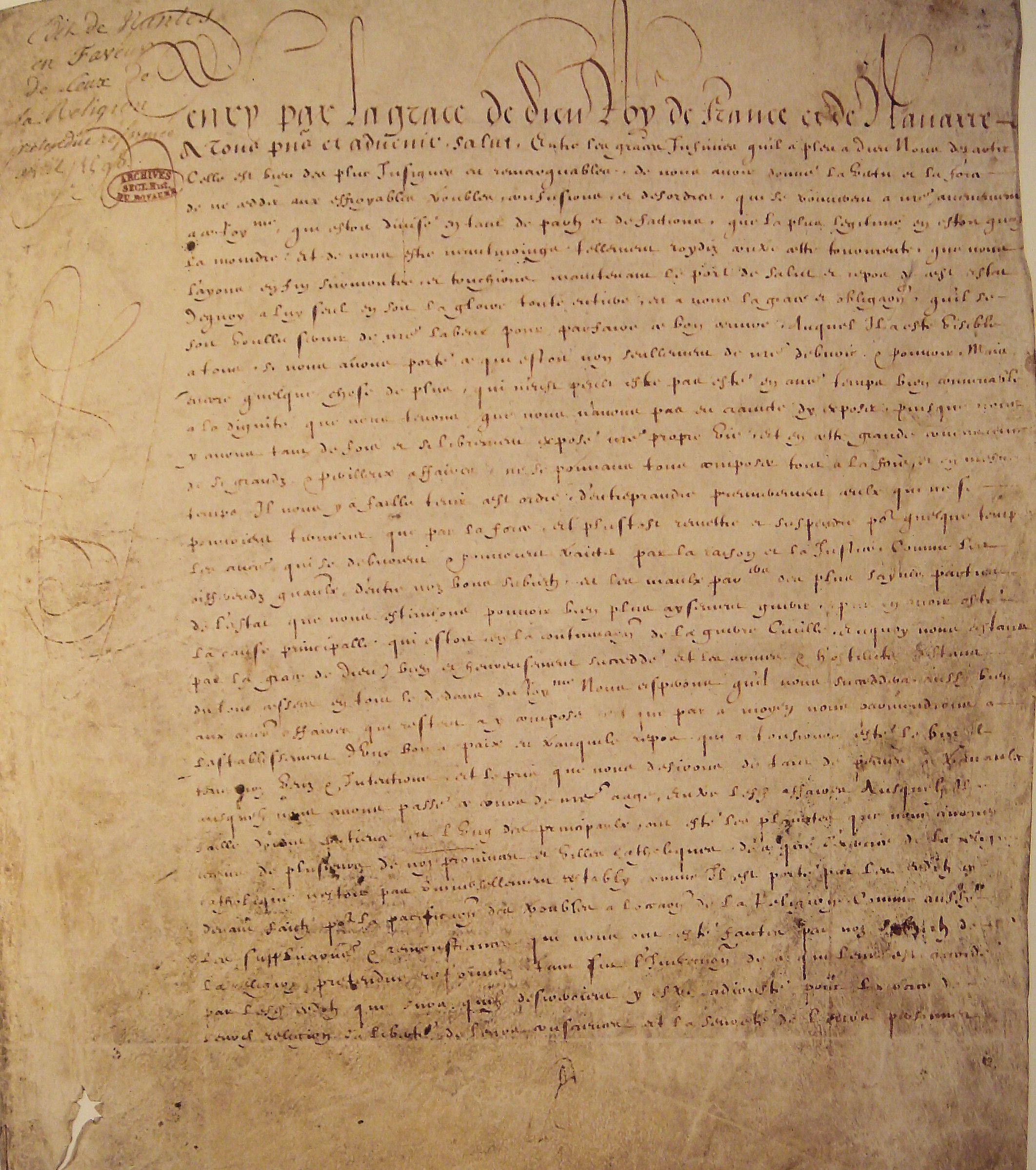
The Edict of Nantes, April 1598

The accession of the Bourbon royal family was a defeat for Protestantism, but at the same time a half-victory for Gallicanism. Ever since the year 1598, the dealings of the Bourbons with Protestantism were regulated by the Edict of Nantes. This instrument not only accorded the Protestants the liberty of practicing their religion in their own homes, in the towns and villages where it had been established before 1597, and in two localities in each bailliage, but also opened to them all employments and created mixed tribunals in which judges were chosen equally from among Catholics and Calvinists; it furthermore made them a political power by recognizing them for eight years as master of about one hundred towns which were known as "places of surety" (places de sûreté).

In favour of the political causes of the Edict, Protestants rapidly became an imperium in imperio, and in 1627, at La Rochelle, they formed an alliance with England to defend, against the government of Louis XIII (1610–43), the privileges of which Cardinal Richelieu, the king's minister, wished to deprive them. The taking of La Rochelle by the king's troops (November 1628), after a siege of fourteen months, and the submission of the Protestant rebels in the Cévenes, resulted in a royal decision which Richelieu called the Grâce d'Alais: the Protestants lost all their political privileges and all their "places of surety" but on the other hand freedom of worship and absolute equality with Catholics were guaranteed them. Both Cardinal Richelieu and his successor, Cardinal Mazarin, scrupulously observed this guarantee."

== Louis XIV and the rule of Gallicanism ==
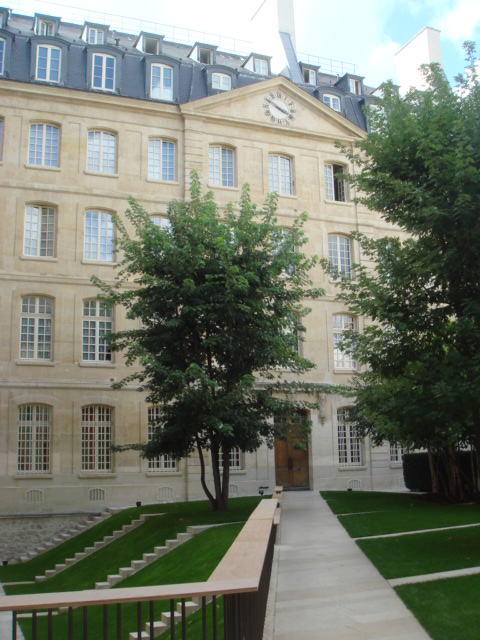
Louis XIV encouraged Catholic missions through the creation of the Paris Foreign Missions Society.

Louis was a pious and devout king who saw himself as the head and protector of the Gallican Church. He made his devotions daily regardless of where he was, following the liturgical calendar regularly. Towards the middle and the end of his reign, the centre for the King's religious observances was usually the Chapelle Royale at Versailles. Ostentation was a distinguishing feature of daily Mass, annual celebrations, such as those of Holy Week, and special ceremonies. Louis established the Paris Foreign Missions Society, but his informal alliance with the Ottoman Empire was criticised by the British for undermining Christendom.

=== Revocation of the Edict of Nantes ===
Louis XIV of France

"Under Louis XIV, a new policy was inaugurated. For twenty-five years the king forbade the Protestants everything that the Edict of Nantes did not expressly guarantee them, and then, foolishly imagining that Protestantism was on the wane, and that there remained in France only a few hundred obstinate heretics, he revoked the Edict of Nantes (1685) and began an oppressive policy against Protestants, which provoked the rising of the Camisards in 1703-05, and which lasted with alternations of severity and kindness until 1784, when Louis XVI was obliged to give Protestants their civil rights once more. The very manner in which Louis XIV, who imagined himself the religious head of his kingdom, set about the Revocation, was only an application of the religious maxims of Gallicanism."

=== Imposition of Gallicanism on the Catholic Church ===
"In the person of Louis XIV, indeed, Gallicanism was on the throne. At the States-General in 1614, the Third Estate had endeavoured to make the assembly commit itself to certain decidedly Gallican declarations, but the clergy, thanks to Cardinal Duperron, had succeeded in shelving the question; then Richelieu, careful not to embroil himself with the pope, had taken up the mitigated and very reserved form of Gallicanism represented by the theologian Duval." The lack of universal adherence to his religion did not sit well with Louis XIV's vision of perfected autocracy: "Bending all else to his will, Louis XIV resented the presence of heretics among his subjects."

"Hence the persecution of Protestants and of Jansenists. But at the same time, he would never allow a papal bull to be published in France until his Parliament decided whether it interfered with the "liberties" of the French Church or the authority of the king. And in 1682, he invited the clergy of France to proclaim the independence of the Gallican Church in a manifesto of four articles, at least two of which, relating to the respective powers of a pope and a council, broached questions which only an ecumenical council could decide. In consequence of this, a crisis arose between the Holy See and Louis XIV, which led to thirty-five sees being left vacant in 1689. The policy of Louis XIV in religious matters was also adopted by Louis XV. His way of striking at the Jesuits in 1763 was in principle the same as that taken by Louis XIV to impose Gallicanism on the Church, the royal power pretending to mastery over the Church.

The domestic policy of the 17th-century Bourbons, aided by Scully, Richelieu, Mazarin, and Louvois, completed the centralization of the kingly power. Abroad, the fundamental maxim of their policy was to keep up the struggle against the House of Austria. The result of the diplomacy of Richelieu (1624–42) and of Mazarin (1643–61) was a fresh defeat for the House of Austria; French arms were victorious at Rocroi, Fribourg, Nördlingen, Lens, Sommershausen (1643–48), and by the Peace of Westphalia (1648) and that of the Pyrenees (1659), Alsace, Artois, and Roussillion were annexed to French territory. In the struggle, Richelieu and Mazarin had the support of the Lutheran prince of Germany and of Protestant countries such as the Sweden of Gustavus Adolphus. In fact, it may be laid down that during the Thirty Years' War, France upheld Protestantism. Louis XIV, on the contrary, who for many years was arbiter of the destinies of Europe, was actuated by purely religious motives in some of his wars. Thus, the war against the Dutch Republic, and that against the League of Augsburg, and his intervention in the affairs of England were in some respects the result of religious policy and of a desire to uphold Catholicism in Europe. The expeditions in the Mediterranean against the pirates of Barbary have all the halo of the old ideals of Christendom – ideals which in the days of Louis XIII had haunted the mind of Father Joseph, the famous confidant of Richelieu, and had inspired him with the dream of crusades led by France, once the House of Austria should have been defeated."

=== Catholic awakening under Louis XIV ===
==== Impact of the Council of Trent ====
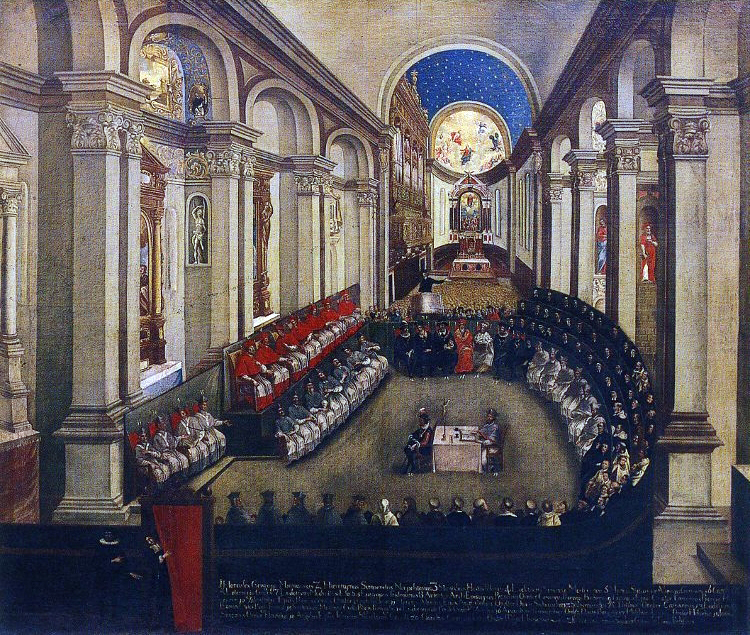
The Council of Trent in Santa Maria Maggiore church had a great impact on the renewal of the Catholic faith in France; Museo Diocesiano Tridentino, Trento.

The 17th century in France was par excellence a century of Catholic awakening. Several bishops set about reforming their diocese according to the rules laid down by the Council of Trent, though its decrees did not run officially in France. The example of Italy bore fruit all over the country. Cardinal de la Rochefoucauld, Bishop of Claremont and afterwards of Senlis, had made the acquaintance of St. Charles Borromeo. Francis Taurugi, a companion of St. Philip Neri, was archbishop of Avignon. St. Francis de Sales Christianized lay society by his Introduction to the Devout Life, which he wrote at the request of Henry IV. Cardinal de Bérulle and his disciple de Condren founded the Oratory. St. Vincent de Paul, in founding the Priests of the Mission, and M. Olier, in founding the Sulpicians, prepared the uplifting of the secular clergy and the development of the grands séminaires.

==== First missionaries ====
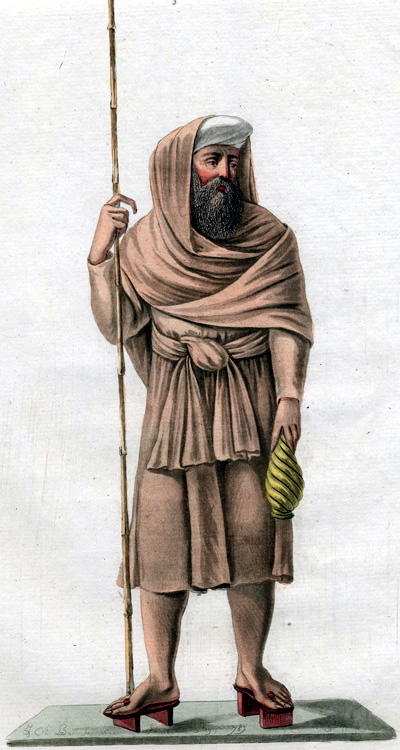
Jesuit missionary, painting from 1779.

It was the period, too, when France began to build up her colonial empire, when Samuel de Champlain was founding prosperous settlements in Acadia and Canada. At the suggestion of Père Coton, confessor to Henry IV, the Jesuits followed in the wake of the colonists; they made Quebec the capital of all that country, and gave it a Frenchman, Mgr. de Montmorency-Laval as its first bishop. The first apostles to the Iroquois were the French Jesuits, Lallemant and de Brébeuf; and it was the French missionaries, as much as the traders, who opened postal communication over 500 leagues of country between the French colonies in Louisiana and Canada. In China, the French Jesuits, by their scientific labours, gained a real influence at court and converted at least one Chinese prince. Lastly, from the beginning of this same 17th century, under the protection of Gontaut-Biron, Marquis de Salignac, Ambassador of France, dates the establishment of the Jesuits at Smyrna, in the Archipelago, in Syria, and at Cairo. A Capuchin, Père Joseph du Tremblay, Richelieu's confessor, established many Capuchin foundations in the East. A pious Parisian lady, Madame Ricouard, gave a sum of money for the erection of a bishopric at Babylon, and its first bishop was a French Carmelite, Jean Duval. St. Vincent De Paul sent the Lazarists into the galleys and prisons of Barbary, and among the islands of Madagascar, Bourbon, Mauritius, and the Mascarenes, to take possession of them in the name of France. On the advice of Jesuit Father de Rhodes, Propaganda and France decided to erect bishoprics in Annam, and in 1660 and 1661 three French bishops, François Pallu, Pierre Lambert de Lamothe, and Cotrolendi, set out for the East. It was the activities of the French missionaries that paved the way for the visit of the Siamese envoys to the court of Louis XIV. In 1663, the Seminary for Foreign Missions was founded, and in 1700, the Société des Missions Etrangères received its approved constitution, which has never been altered."

== Enlightenment and Revolution ==
"Religiously speaking, during the 18th century the alliance of parliamentary Gallicanism and Jansenism weakened the idea of religion in an atmosphere already threatened by philosophers, and although the monarchy continued to keep the style and title of "Most Christian", unbelief and libertinage were harboured, and at times defended, at the court of Louis XV (1715–74), in the salons, and among the aristocracy.

=== Wars with England ===
"Politically, the traditional strife between France and the House of Austria ended, about the middle of the 18th century, with the famous Renversement des Alliances. This century is filled with that struggle between France and England, which may be called the second Hundred Years' War, during which England had for an ally Frederick II, King of Prussia, a country which was then rapidly rising in importance. The command of the sea was at stake. In spite of men like Dupliex, Lally-Tollendal, and Montcalm, France lightly abandoned its colonies by successive treaties, the most important of which was the Treaty of Paris (1763). The acquisition of Lorraine (1766), and the purchase of Corsica from the Genoese (1768), were poor compensations for these losses; and when, under Louis XVI, the French navy once more raised its head, it helped in the revolt of the English colonies in America, and thus seconded the emancipation of the United States (1778-83)."

=== New ideas of the Enlightenment ===
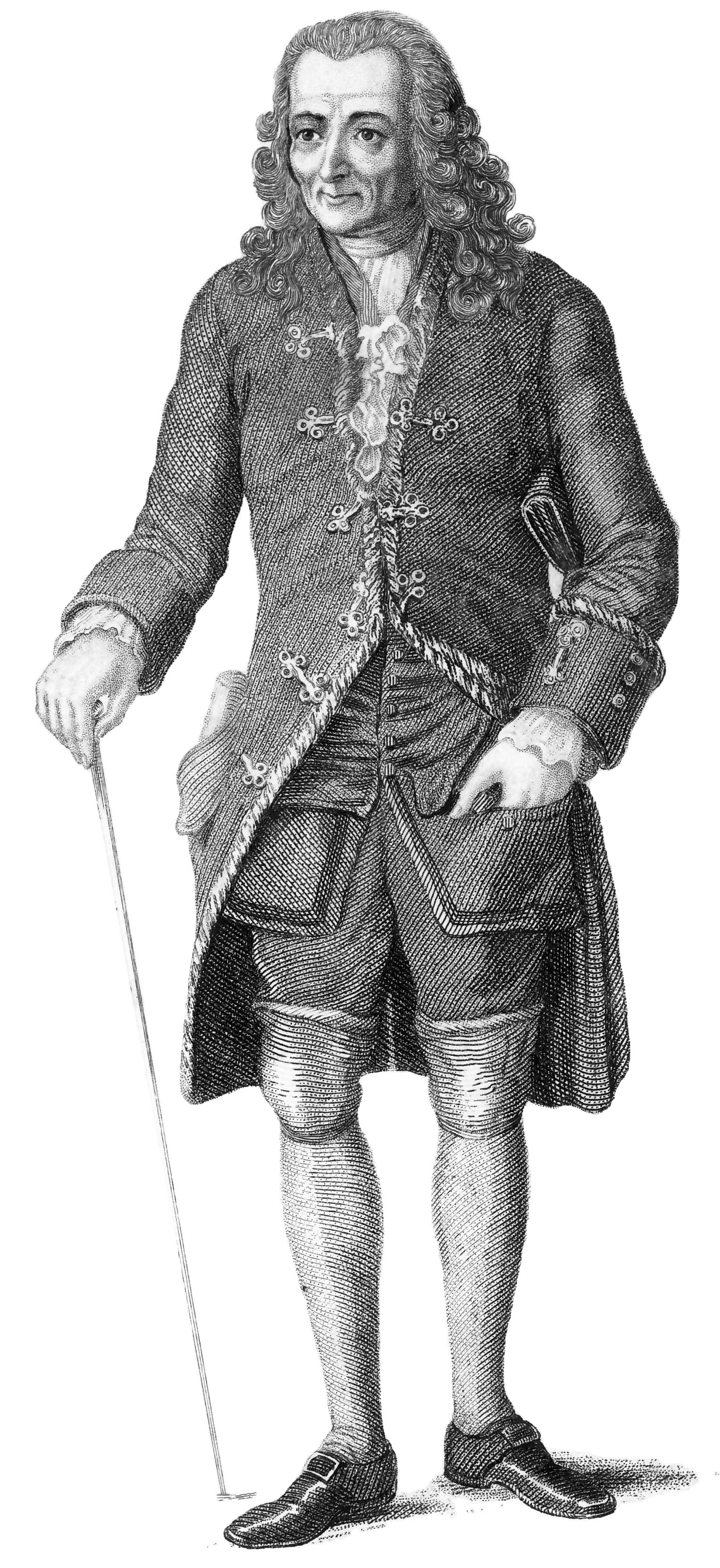
Voltaire at 70. Engraving from 1843 edition of his Philosophical Dictionary.

"The movement of thought of which Montesquieu, Voltaire, Rousseau, and Diderot, each in his own fashion, had been protagonists, an impatience provoked by the abuses incident to a too centralized monarchy, and the yearning for equality which was deeply agitating the French people, all prepared the explosion of the French Revolution. That upheaval has been too long regarded as a break in the history of France. The researches of Albert Sorel have proved that the diplomatic traditions of the old regime were perpetuated under the Revolution; the idea of the State's ascendancy over the Church, which had actuated the ministers of Louis XIV and the adherents of Parliament – the parliamentaires – in the days of Louis XV, reappears with the authors of the "Civil Constitution of the Clergy", even as the centralizing spirit of the old monarchy reappears with the administrative officials and the commissaries of the convention. It is easier to cut off a king's head than to change the mental constitution of a people."

=== Revolution ===
==== Rejection of the Catholic Church ====
Map (in French) of the percentage of jurors among French priests.

"The Constituent Assembly (5 May 1789-30 September 1791) rejected the motion of the Abbé d'Eymar declaring the Catholic religion to be the religion of the state, but it did not thereby mean to place the Catholic religion on the same level as other religions. Voulland, addressing the Assembly on the seemliness of having one dominant religion, declared that the Catholic religion was founded on too pure a moral basis not to be given precedence. Article 10 of the Declarations of the rights of man (August 1789) proclaimed toleration, stipulating "that no one ought to be interfered with because of his opinions, even religious, provided that their manifestation does not disturb public order" (pourvu que leur manifestation ne trouble pas l'ordre public établi par là). It was by virtue of the suppression of feudal privileges, and in accordance with the ideas professed by the lawyers of the old regime, that the Constituent Assembly abolished tithes and confiscated the Church's possessions, replacing them with an annuity grant from the treasury.

==== Persecution of the priesthood ====
"The Civil Constitution of the Clergy was a more serious interference with the life of French Catholicism, and it was drawn up at the instigation of Jansenist lawyers. Without referring to the pope, it set up a new division into diocese, gave the voters, no matter who they might be, a right to nominate parish priests and bishops, ordered metropolitans to take charge of the canonical institution of their suffragans, and forbade the bishops from seeking a Bull of confirmation in office from Rome. The Constituent Assembly required all priests to swear to obey this constitution, which received the unwilling sanction of Louis XVI, 26 December 1790, and was condemned by Pius VI. By Briefs dated 10 March and 13 April, Pius VI forbade the priests to take the oath, and the majority obeyed him. Against these "unsworn" (insermentés) or "refractory" priests, a period of persecution soon began. The Legislative Assembly (1 October 1791 – 21 September 1792), while it prepared the way for the republic which both the great parties (the Mountain and the Girondists) equally wished, only aggravated the religious difficulty. On 19 November 1791, it decreed that those priests who had not accepted the "Civil Constitution" would be required within a week to swear allegiance to the nation, to the law, and to the king, under pain of having their allowances stopped and of being held as suspects. The king refused to approve this, and (26 August 1792) it declared that all refractory priests should leave France under pain of ten years' imprisonment or transportation to Guiana."

The tone of the Civil Constitution can be gleaned from Title II, Article XXI:

Before the ceremony of consecration begins, the bishop elect shall take a solemn oath, in the presence of the municipal officers, of the people, and of the clergy, to guard with care the faithful of his diocese who are confided to him, to be loyal to the nation, the law, and the king, and to support with all his power the constitution decreed by the National Assembly and accepted by the king.

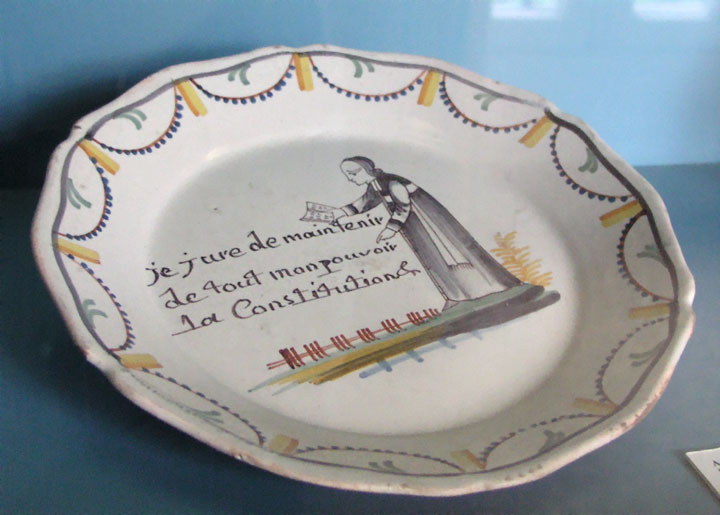
A commemorative plate from 1790 shows a curate swearing the Constitution.

"The Convention (21 September 1792 – 26 October 1795), which proclaimed the republic and caused Louis XVI to be executed (21 January 1793), followed a very tortuous policy toward religion. As early as 13 November 1792, Cambon, in the name of the Financial Committee, announced to the Convention that he would speedily submit a scheme of general reform including a suppression of the appropriation for religious worship, which, he asserted, cost the republic "100,000,000 livres annually". The Jacobins opposed this scheme as premature, and Robespierre declared it derogatory to public morality. During the first eight months of its existence, the policy of the convention was to maintain the "Civil Constitution" and to increase the penalties against "refractory" priests who were suspected of complicity in the War in the Vendée. A decree dated 18 March 1793 punished with death all compromised priests. It no longer aimed at refractory priests only, but any ecclesiastic accused of disloyalty (incivisme) by any six citizens became liable to transportation. In the eyes of the revolution, there were no longer good priests and bad priests; for the sans-culottes every priest was suspect."

==== Anti-religious dictatorship under the Terror ====
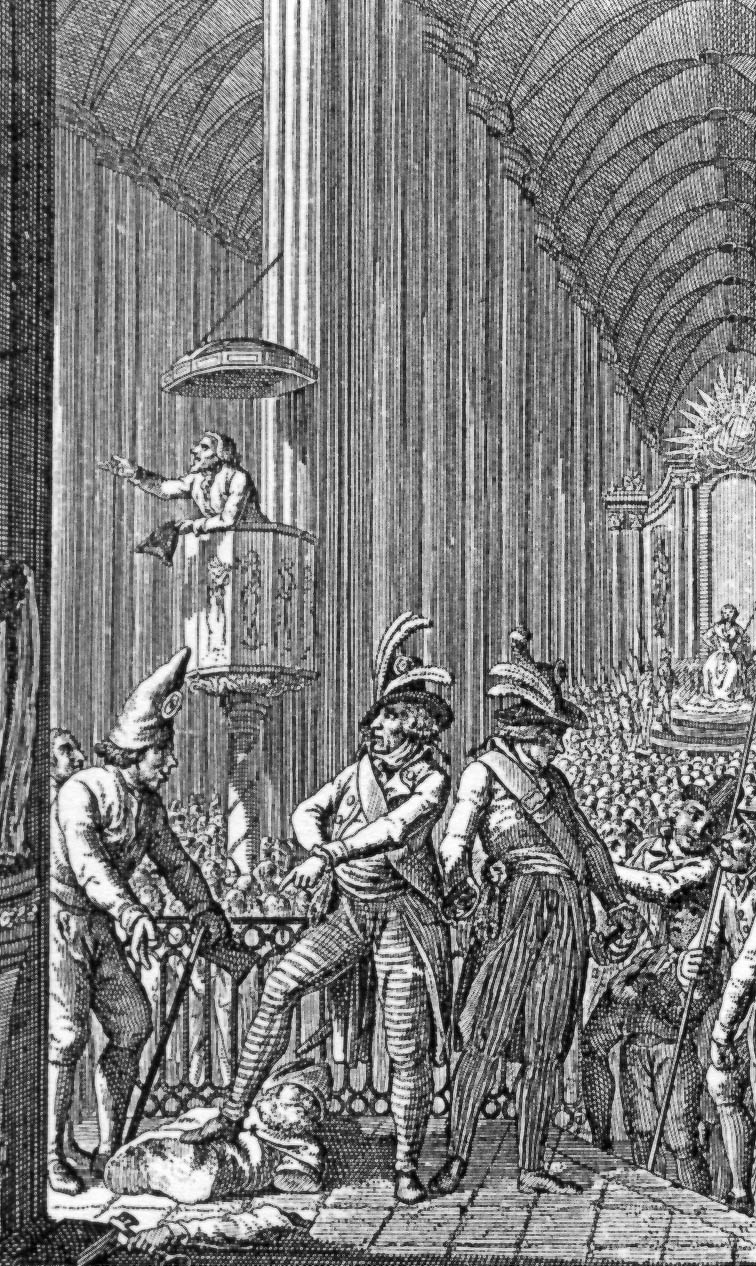
Notre Dame of Strasbourg turned into a Temple of Reason.

"From the provinces, stirred up by the propaganda of André Dumont, Chaumette, and Fouché, there began a movement of dechristianization. The constitutional bishop, Gobrel, abdicated in November 1793, together with his vicars-general. At the feast of Liberty, which took place in Notre-Dame on 10 November, an altar was set up to the Goddess of Reason, and the church of Our Lady became the temple of that goddess. Some days after this, a deputation attired in priestly vestments, in mockery of Catholic worship, paraded before the convention. The Commune of Paris, on 24 November 1793, with Chaumette as its spokesman, demanded the closing of all churches. But the Committee of Public Safety was in favour of temporizing, to avoid frightening the populace and scandalizing Europe. On 21 November 1793, Robespierre, speaking from the Jacobin tribune of the convention, protested against the violence of the dechristianizing party, and in December the Committee of Public Safety induced the convention to pass a decree ensuring freedom of worship and forbidding the closing of Catholic churches. Everywhere throughout the provinces, civil war was breaking out between the peasants, who clung to their religion and faith, and the fanatics of the Revolution, who, in the name of patriotism, threatened, as they said, by the priests, were overturning the altars. According to the locality in which they happened to be, the propagandists either encouraged or hindered this violence against religion, but even in the bitterest days of the terror, there was never a moment when Catholic worship was suppressed throughout France.

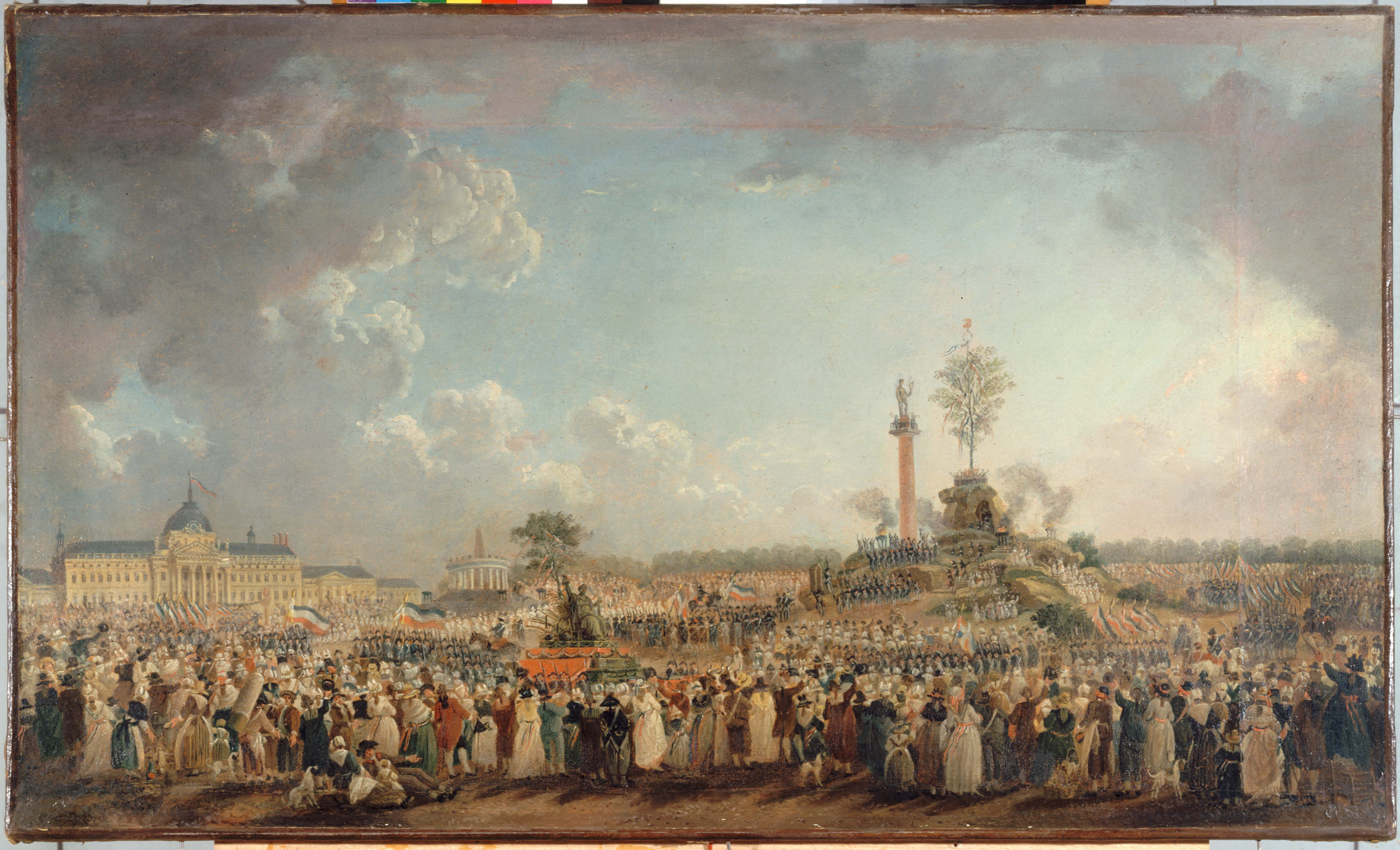
Festival of the Supreme Being, 8 June 1794

When Robespierre had sent the partisans of Hébert and of Danton to the scaffold, he attempted to set up in France what he called la religion de l'Etre Suprême. Liberty of conscience was suppressed, but atheism was also a crime. Quoting the words of Rousseau about the indispensable dogmas, Robespierre had himself proclaimed a religious leader, a pontiff, and a dictator; and the worship of the Etre Supreme was held up by his supporters as the religious embodiment of patriotism."

==== Progressive restitution of freedom of religion ====
"After the 9th of Thermidor, Cambon proposed once more the principle of separation between Church and State, and it was decided that henceforth the Republic would not pay the expenses of any form of worship (18 September 1794). The Convention next voted the laicization of the primary schools, and the establishment, at intervals of ten days, of feasts called fêtes décadaires. When Bishop Grégoire, in a speech, ventured to hope that Catholicism would some day spring up anew, the Convention protested. Nevertheless, the people in the provinces were anxious that the clergy should resume their functions, and "constitutional" priests, less in danger than the others, rebuilt the altars here and there throughout the country. In February 1795, Boissy-d'Anglas carried a measure of religious liberty, and the very next day, Mass was said in all the chapels of Paris. On Easter Sunday, 1795, in the same city which, a few months before, had applauded the worship of Reason, almost every shop closed its doors.

In May 1795, the Convention restored the churches for worship, on condition that the pastors should submit to the laws of the State; in September 1795, less than a month before its dissolution, it regulated liberty of worship by a police law, and enacted severe penalties against priests liable to transportation or imprisonment who should venture back on French soil.

The Directory (27 October 1795 – 9 November 1799), which succeeded the convention, imposed on all religious ministers (Fructidor, Year V) the obligation of swearing hatred to royalty and anarchy. A certain number of "papist" priests took the oath, and the "papist" religion was thus established here and there, though it continued to be disturbed by the incessant arbitrary acts of interference on the part of the administrative staff of the Directory, who by individual warrants deported priests charged with inciting to disturbance. In this way, 1657 French and 8235 Belgian priests were driven into exile. The Directory aimed to substitute for Catholicism the culte décadaire, and for Sunday observance the rest on the décadis, or tenth days. In Paris, fifteen churches were given over to this cult. The Directory also favoured an unofficial attempt of Chemin, the writer, and a few of his friends to set up a kind of national Church under the name of "Theophilanthropy"; but Theophilanthropy and the culte décadaire, while they disturbed the Church, did not satisfy the needs of the people for priests, altars, and the traditional festivals."

== Napoleon I and the Concordat of 1801 ==
=== Concordat and the revival of congregations ===
Religion had been a major issue during the Revolution, and Napoleon resolved most of the outstanding problems. Thereby, he moved the clergy and large numbers of devout Catholics from hostility to the government to support for him. The Catholic system was reestablished by the Concordat of 1801 (signed with Pope Pius VII), so that church life returned to normal; the church lands were not restored, but the Jesuits were allowed back in and the bitter fights between the government and Church ended. Protestants and atheists were tolerated. The Concordat was in effect until 1905.

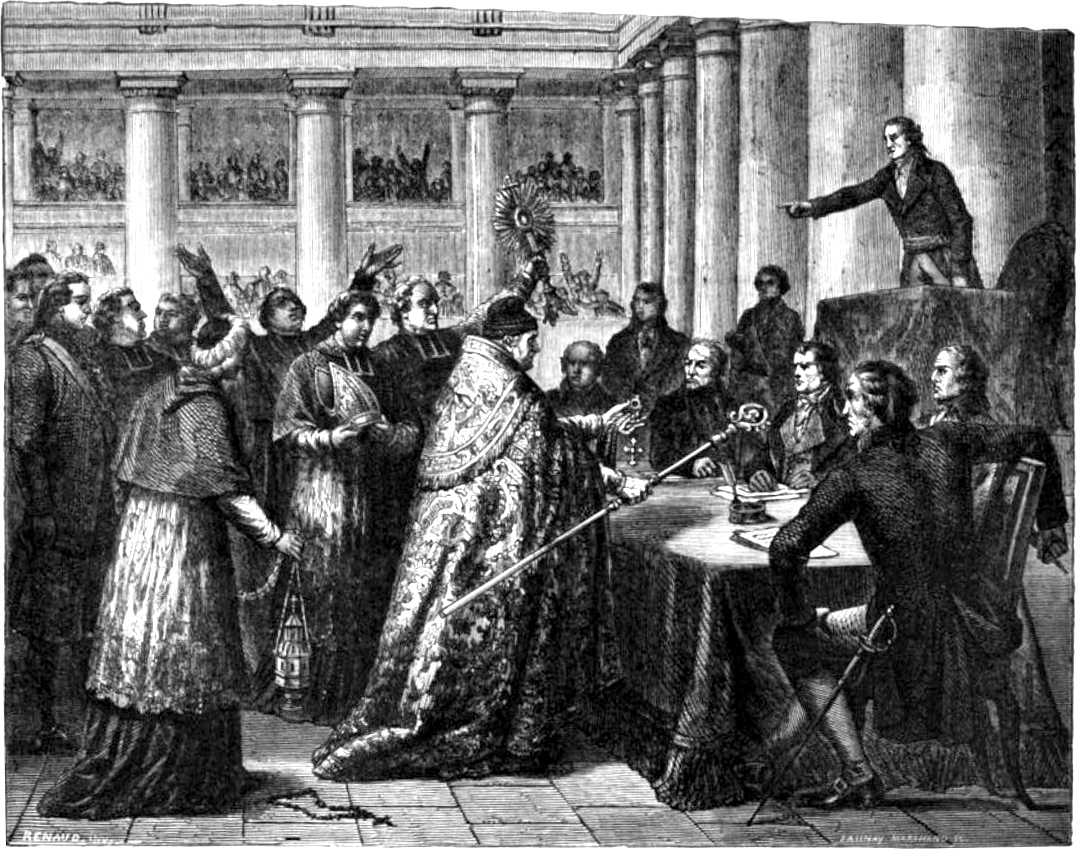
Leaders of the Catholic Church taking the civil oath required by the Concordat.

All these were restored by the Concordat of Napoleon Bonaparte, who became Consul for ten years on 4 November 1799. The Concordat assured French Catholicism, despite the interpolation of the articles organiques, a hundred years of peace. The conduct of Napoleon I, when he became emperor (18 May 1804), towards Pius VII was most offensive to the papacy; but even during those years when Napoleon was ill-treating Pius VII and keeping him a prisoner, Catholicism in France was reviving and expanding day by day. Numerous religious congregations came to life again or grew up rapidly, often under the guidance of simple priests or humble women, religious sisters. The Sisters of Christian Schools of Mercy, who work in hospitals and schools, date from 1802, as do the Sisters of Providence of Langres; the Sisters of Mercy of Montauban from 1804; the Sisters of the Sacred Heart of Jesus at St-Julien-du-Gua date from 1805. In 1806, we have the Sisters of Reuilly-sur-Loire, founded by the Abbé Dujarie; the Sisters of St. Regis at Aubenis, founded by the Abbé Therne; the Sisters of Notre Dame de Bon Secours at Charly; and the Sisters of Mercy of Billom. The Sisters of Wisdom, founded by Blessed Grignon de Montfort, remodelled their institutions at this time in La Vendée, and Madame Dupleix was founded at Lyons and at Durat the Confraternity of Mary and Joseph for visiting the prisons. The year 1807 saw the coming of the Sisters of Christian Teaching and Nursing (de l'Instruction chrétienne et des malades) of St-Gildas-des-Bois, founded by the Abbé Deshayes and the great teaching order of the Sisters of Ste-Chrétienne of Metz. In 1809, there appeared in Aveyron the Sisters of the Blessed Virgin Mary; in 1810, the sisters of St. Joseph of Vaur (Ardéche), the Sister Hospitallers of Rennes, and the Sisters of St. Joseph of Cluny. Such was the fruit of eight years of religious revival, and the list could easily be continued through the years that followed.

=== Vocation for the care of the poor in the Industrial Revolution ===
Under the Restoration parliamentary government was introduced into France. The revolution of July 1830, the "liberal" and "bourgeois" revolution asserted against the absolutism of Charles X those rights which had been guaranteed to Frenchmen by the Constitution – the "Charte" as it was called – and brought to the throne of Louis Phillipe, Duke of Orléans, during whose reign as "King of the French" the establishment of French rule in Algeria was finally completed. One of the most admirable charitable institutions of French origin dates from the July Monarchy, namely the Little Sisters of the Poor begun (1840) by Jeanne Jugan, Franchon Aubert, Marie Jamet, and Virginie Trédaniel, poor working-women who formed themselves into an association to take care of one blind old woman. In 1900, the congregation thus begun counted 3000 Little Sisters distributed among 250 to 260 houses all over the world, and caring for 28,000 old people. Under the July Monarchy, also, the conferences of the Society of Saint Vincent de Paul were founded, the first of them at Paris, in May 1833, by pious laymen under the prompting of Ozanam, for the material and moral assistance of poor families; in 1900 there were in France alone 1224 of these conferences, and in the whole world 5000. In 1895, the city of Paris had 208 conferences caring for 7908 families. The mean annual receipts of the conferences of St. Vincent De Paul in the whole of France amount to 2,198,566 francs ($440,000.00 or £88,000). In 1906, the receipts from the conferences all over the world amounted to 13,453,228 francs ($2,690,645), and their expenditures to 13,541,504 francs ($2,708,300), while, to meet extraordinary demands, they had a reserve balance of 3,069,154 francs ($613,830). The annual expenditure always exceeds the annual amount received. As Cardinal Regnier was fond of saying, "The conferences have taken the vow of poverty."

The Revolution of February 1848 against Louis Philippe and Guizot, his minister, who wished to maintain a property qualification for the suffrage, led to the establishment of the Second Republic and universal suffrage. By granting liberty of teaching (Loi Falloux), and by sending an army to Rome to assist Pius IX, it earned the gratitude of Catholics. At this point in history, when so many social and democratic aspirations were being agitated, the social efficaciousness of Christian thought was demonstrated by Vicomte de Melun, who developed the "Société Charitable" and the "Annales de la Charité" and carried a law on old-age pensions and mutual benefit societies; and by Le Prévost, founder of the Congregation of the Brothers of St. Vincent De Paul, who, leading a religious life in the garb of laymen, visited among the working classes."

== Third Republic and anti-clericalism ==
Throughout the lifetime of the Third Republic (1870–1940), there were fierce battles over the status of the Catholic Church among the Republicans, the Monarchists and the Authoritarians (such as the Napoleonists). The French clergy and bishops were closely associated with the Monarchists, and many of their hierarchy were from noble families. Republicans were based in the anticlerical middle class who saw the Church's alliance with the monarchists as a political threat to republicanism and a threat to the modern spirit of progress. The Republicans detested the church for its political and class affiliations; for them, the church represented the Ancien Régime, a time in French history most Republicans hoped was long behind them. The Republicans were strengthened by Protestant and Jewish support. Numerous laws were passed to weaken the Catholic Church. In 1879, priests were excluded from the administrative committees of hospitals and of boards of charity; in 1880, new measures were directed against the religious congregations; from 1880 to 1890 came the substitution of lay women for religious sisters in many hospitals; and in 1882, Ferry school laws were passed. Napoleon's Concordat continued in operation, but in 1881 the government cut off salaries to priests it disliked.

Republicans feared that many schools taught anti-Republicanism to children, especially schools of religious institutes such as the Jesuits and Assumptionists. Determined to root this out, Republicans insisted they needed control of all the schools if economic and militaristic progress was to be achieved; Republicans felt one of the primary reasons for the German victory in 1870 was their superior education system. The early anti-Catholic laws were largely the work of republican Jules Ferry in 1882. Religious instruction in all schools was forbidden, and religious institutes were forbidden to teach in them. Funds were appropriated from religious schools to build more state schools. Later in the century, other laws passed by Ferry's successors further weakened the Church's position in French society. Civil marriage became compulsory, divorce was introduced, and chaplains were removed from the army.

When Leo XIII became pope in 1878, he tried to calm Church-State relations. In 1884, he told French bishops not to act in a hostile manner to the State. In 1892, he issued an encyclical advising French Catholics to rally to the Republic and defend the Church by participating in Republican politics. This attempt at improving the relationship failed. Deep-rooted suspicions remained on both sides and were inflamed by the Dreyfus Affair. Catholics were, for the most part anti-dreyfus. The Assumptionists published anti-Semitic and anti-republican articles in their journal La Croix. This infuriated Republican politicians, who were eager to take revenge. Often, they worked in alliance with Masonic lodges.

=== Defeat of Catholicism ===
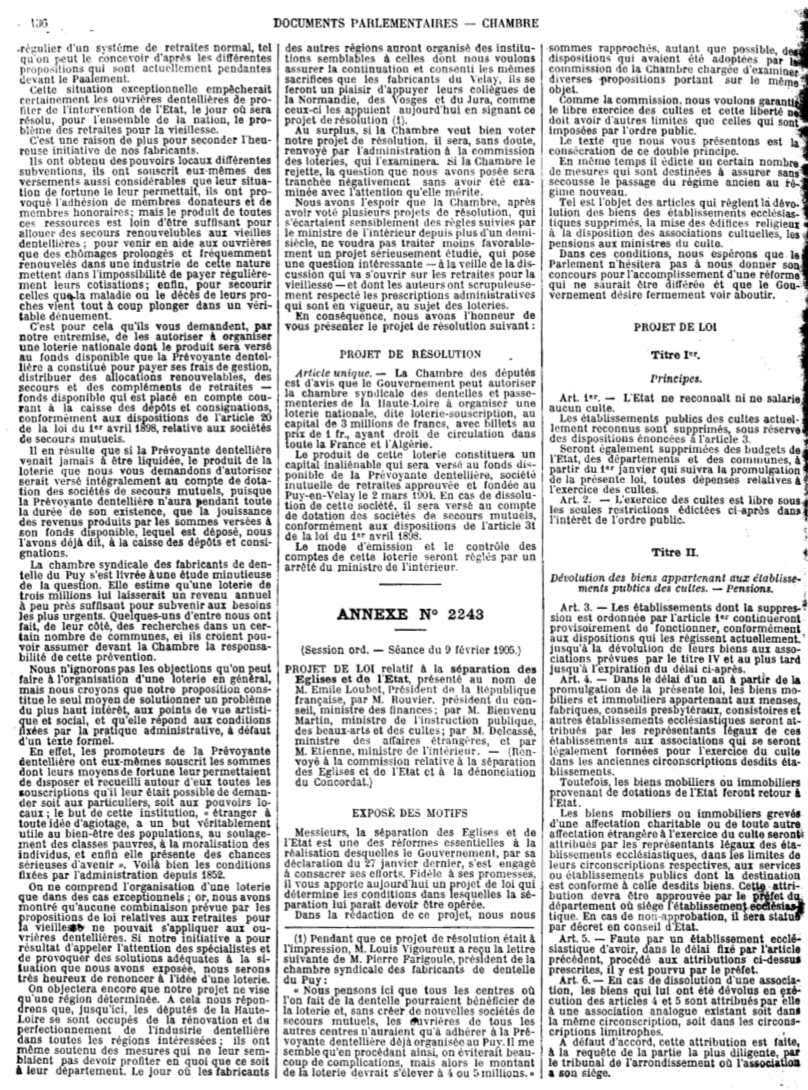
The first page of the bill, as brought before the Chambre des Députés in 1905

In 1901, France was home to the largest number of Catholic Christians, where 40.5 million people, or 98.4% of the French population, were Catholics. And at the beginning of the twentieth century, Paris was the largest Catholic city.

Émile Combes, when elected prime minister in 1902, was determined to thoroughly defeat the influence of Catholic clericalism in the public lives of the French. After only a short while in office, Combes had ordered all parochial schools in France to be shut down. Shortly thereafter, he had parliament reject the authority of all state-sponsored religious institutes. This decree meant, among other things, that all fifty-four monastic orders in France were to be dissolved, causing the emigration of some 20,000 uprooted mendicants from France, many of whom were destined for Spain. In 1904, French President Émile Loubet visited the King of Italy, Victor Emmanuel III, in Rome; the Pope protested at this recognition of the Italian State. Combes reacted strongly and recalled his ambassador to the Vatican. Then, in 1905, a law was introduced abrogating Napoleon's 1801 Concordat. Church and State were finally separated. All Church property was confiscated. The religious no longer were paid by the State. Public worship was given over to associations of Catholic laymen who controlled access to churches. In practice, Masses and rituals continued.

The Waldeck-Rousseau Ministry (1899–1902) and the Combes Ministry (1902–05) disputed with the Vatican over the appointment of bishops. Chaplains were removed from naval and military hospitals (1903–04), and soldiers were ordered not to frequent Catholic clubs (1904). The Combes government worked with Masonic lodges to create a secret surveillance of all army officers to make sure that devout Catholics would not be promoted. Exposed as the Affaire Des Fiches, the scandal undermined support for the Combes government, and he resigned. It also undermined morale in the army, as officers realized that hostile spies examining their private lives were more important to their careers than their own professional accomplishments.

On 10 February 1905, the Chamber declared that "the attitude of the Vatican" had rendered the separation of Church and State inevitable, and the law of the separation of church and state was passed in December 1905. The Church was badly hurt and lost half its priests. In the long run, however, it gained autonomy – for the State no longer had a voice in choosing bishops and Gallicanism was dead.

Historian Kenneth Scott Latourette has examined the impact of separation. He has written that at first, it appeared disastrous because it followed the closing of the majority of the orders of priests and religious sisters, the closing of thousands of Catholic schools, and the secularizing of other aspects of life. The Pope's refusal to compromise made it harder to function. However, all was not lost:

The adjustment was difficult and at times painful, but the Roman Catholic Church survived. To be sure, many of the clergy were badly inconvenienced. ...Many [priests] continued their functions as pastors while working at other occupations to support themselves. The number of young men entering the priesthood sharply declined. ...No longer was the priest the chief man in the rural village. Now that state education prevailed, the teacher, trained in the secular attitude, competed with him and, in places, overshadowed him. The control of the Vatican over the episcopate was heightened. The Pope need no longer be guided by nominations from the state. ...Bishops and their clergy were now liberated from control by the civil authorities. The Church could arrange as it saw fit the boundaries of its dioceses. The clergy were no longer subject to penalties for displeasing the state, such as the suspension of their salaries. Traces of Gallicanism survived, but on the whole, ultramontanism had conquered. Working arrangements were devised ... by which the church buildings could continue to be used for worship. Parish committees laboured to maintain public worship, and private gifts came to the rescue of Catholic charities.

=== Laymen ===
The Catholic Church expanded its social activities after 1920, especially by forming youth movements. For example, the largest organization of young working women was the Jeunesse Ouvrière Chrétienne/Féminine (JOC/F), founded in 1928. It encouraged young working women to adopt Catholic approaches to morality and to prepare for future roles as mothers, at the same time as it promoted notions of spiritual equality and encouraged young women to take active, independent, and public roles in the present. The model of youth groups was expanded to reach adults in the Ligue ouvrière chrétienne féminine and the Mouvement populaire des familles. These groups advocated ideas that were sometimes conservative, sometimes liberal, often contradictory, but all rooted in Catholic social doctrine.

== World Wars ==
=== World War I ===
French Catholic priests fought valiantly in the war; 33,000 priests joined the army, of whom 4,600 were killed, and over 10,000 were awarded medals for bravery. Much of the religious fear and distrust was dissolved by the camaraderie of the trenches, never to reappear in politics.

After the Great War, the national spirit was built up around France's Catholic history and traditions, as can be seen with the mystification of St Joan of Arc, who was canonized on 16 May 1920. Over 30,000 people attended the ceremony in Rome, including 140 descendants of Joan of Arc's family. Pope Benedict XV presided over the rite. St Joan of Arc was to remain a symbol of French Catholic pride.

Flag of Charles de Gaulle's government in exile during World War II. The French Resistance used the cross of Lorraine as a symbolic reference to Joan of Arc.

=== World War II ===
The debate over the involvement of the Catholic Church in France reflects the debate over the involvement of the worldwide Catholic Church during World War II. Some criticize the silence of the Catholic Church in France over the deportation of the Jews.

The Vichy government had given the Church the draft law on the status of Jews. On 31 August 1940, Bishop Gerlier spoke to the Assembly of Cardinals and Archbishops (ACA), emphasizing the "manifest goodwill of the government."

On the one hand, the fact of the existence of an international Jewish community to which are attached the Jews of all nations and that these are not ordinary foreigners welcomed in a country but people to assimilate, may require a State to take precautionary measures on behalf of the common good. On the other hand, however, a State cannot chase the Jews irrespective of their activities, deny them the rights they derive from nature in the individual or family.

Asher Cohen sums up the position of French bishops: "They gave carte blanche to the regulations and the law against foreign Jews, but also, without knowing it, gave a warning against the deportations."

If the case of Father Alexandre Glasberg, who was concerned already in 1940 for the foreign population interned in camps, is exceptional, Asher Cohen writes that he was at the end of 1940 the only anti-clerical pétainiste in Lyon, but that aid to the Jews became widespread in many parishes after the Act of 2 June 1941, hardening the status of Jews and encouraging them to seek false certificates of baptism.

Broadly speaking, the defeat and subsequent hardship of life under occupation triggered a revival of religious fervour, marked by increased participation of the faithful in various forms of religious practices and an influx of future seminarians, as the table established by Canon Boulard shows the changes in the rate of ordinations.

Ordination rate in metropolitan France between 1900 and 1950
1900-1904	1909–1913	1925–1929	1934–1938	1940–1947	1948–1950
51	30	30	39	50	39

After the war, the Church attempted to publish various official explanations and acts of repentance regarding its experiences during the Occupation. In 1947, the archbishop-coadjutor of the Cambrai Archdiocese. Guerry, former secretary of the ACA, sought to justify the silence of the years 1940 and 1941 on the status of Jews. In 1995, about 85 bishops, priests and French religious were honored by the Yad Vashem medal, which recognizes the "Righteous Among the Nations". In his 1985 book on the deportation of Jews from France, Serge Klarsfeld raised awareness of the role of Catholics in the rescue of Jews, which was considered much more significant than previously thought.

== Post-war France and the Second Vatican Council ==
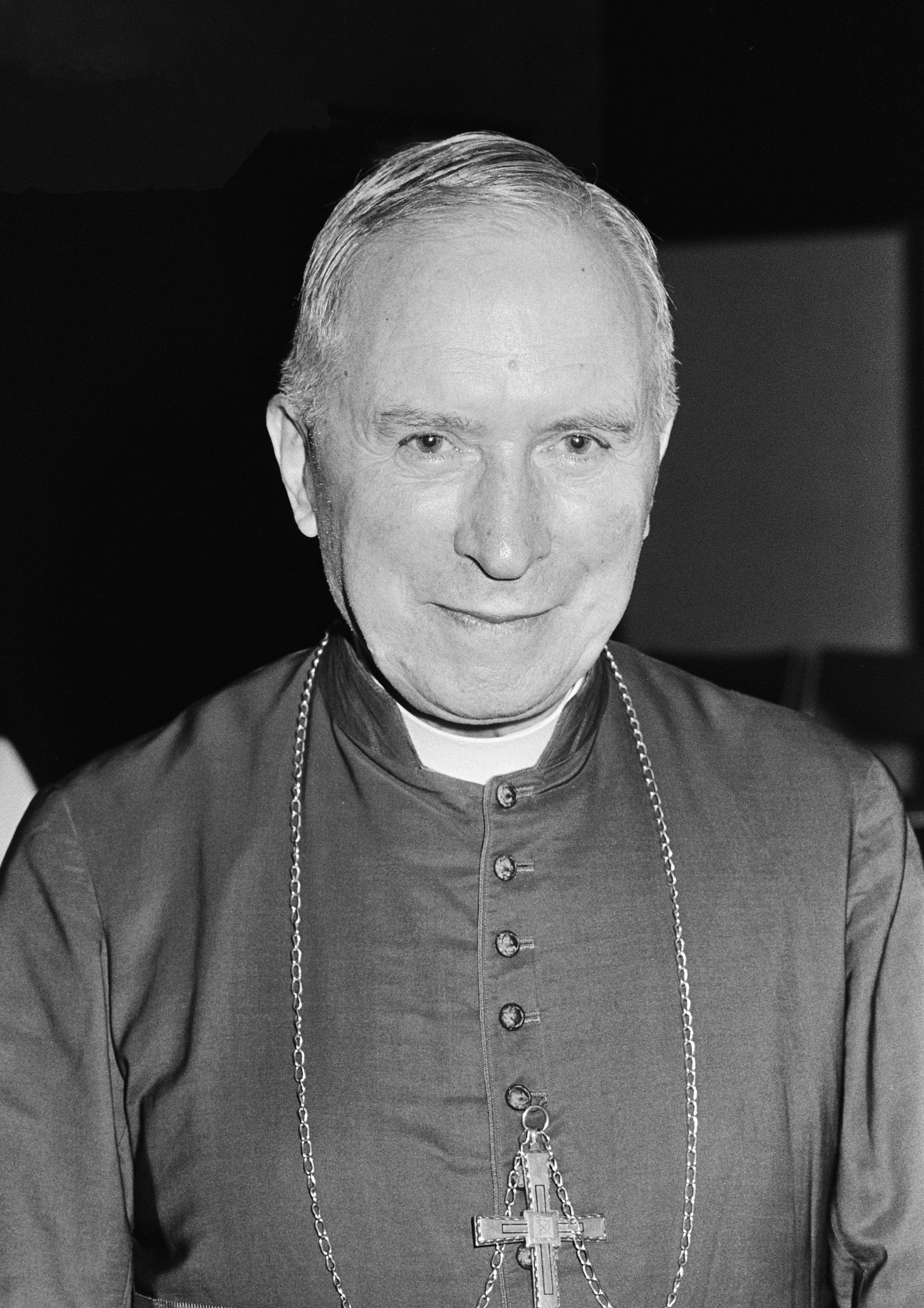
Marcel Lefebvre

Post-war France is a country with deeply rooted and widespread Catholic values and beliefs. The revival and dynamics of the faith are seen in the festivities around the 100th anniversary of the Lourdes apparitions, which attract over 2 million persons annually. However, scandals in the Church and the new wave of existentialist intellectuals reject their bourgeois and Catholic heritage, with leading figures such as Jean-Paul Sartre and Simone de Beauvoir.

The Second Vatican Council introduced new energy in a rigidly structured Church. But the tensions between progressives, liberals and traditionalists led to break-ups in the Church. On one side, the temptation of Marxism had brought some priests to join the class struggle, but on 1 March 1954, an ultimatum was given to worker priests to quit their jobs. On the other side, many traditionalists feared that the change brought about by the council could whittle down the substance of the faith. Some followed the lead of Monseigneur Lefebvre to stick to pre-Council ways. In 1970, Marcel-François Lefebvre founded the Society of St. Pius X (SSPX), a traditionalist Catholic priestly society. In 1988, against the orders of Pope John Paul II, he consecrated four bishops to continue his work with the SSPX. The Holy See immediately declared that he and the other bishops who had participated in the ceremony had incurred automatic excommunication under Catholic canon law. Lefebvre's supporters disputed the excommunication. In 2009, the Holy See lifted it for the four surviving bishops. However, other splinter groups of French Traditionalist Catholics, such as Fraternite Notre Dame, continue to expand.

During the 1960s, all the curves started a brutal and enduring downward curve. This drop was caused by the loss of credibility in the structures where authority had an important role, the sexual revolution in the wake of May 68, which marginalized celibacy, the revolution in entertainment which put worship in competition with other more attractive occupations, and the general effects of consumerism and relativism. In this context, young people were the first to leave the Catholic Church.

== Recent history ==
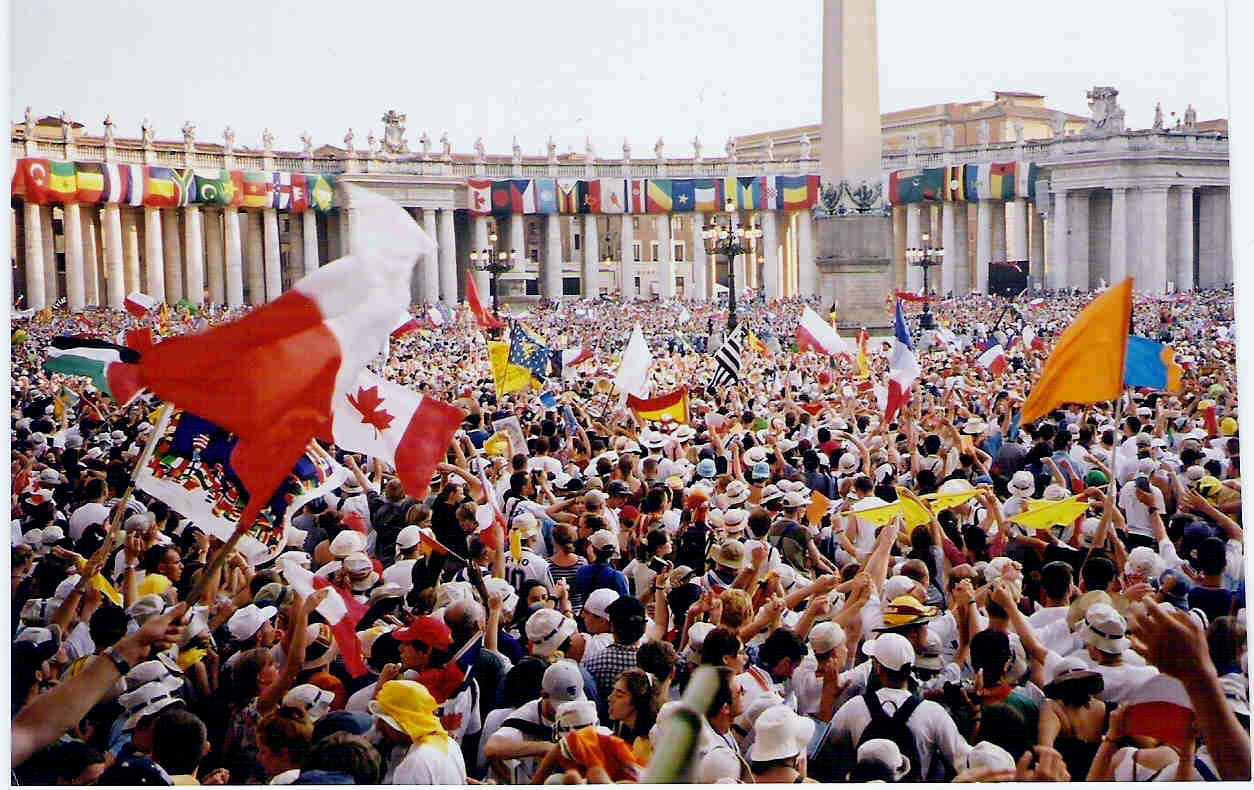
World Youth Day 2000 in Rome was attended by many French youth

The crisis in the faith seems to have reached a peak in the 1990s. The percentage of declared Catholics went from 71% of the population in 1981 to 53% in 1999. At the same time, the number of baptized persons is estimated at 45 million or 75% of the population. In the same period, the percentage of practising Catholics went from 18% to 12% of the population, from 9.7 to 7 million.

Despite this decline, Catholicism is still present in French society through family associations and various commissions, committees, or parliamentary Catholics and maintains a role in political, social and ethical debates. French media give space to Catholic news, especially during the pope's trips, parties, or religious debates on secularism and religious issues, which remain sensitive subjects despite the separation of Church and State.

Finally, since the 1990s, greater participation has been noticed at gatherings of young people, as well as various national pilgrimages, indicating probable involvement of other Christians in the life of the Catholic Church.

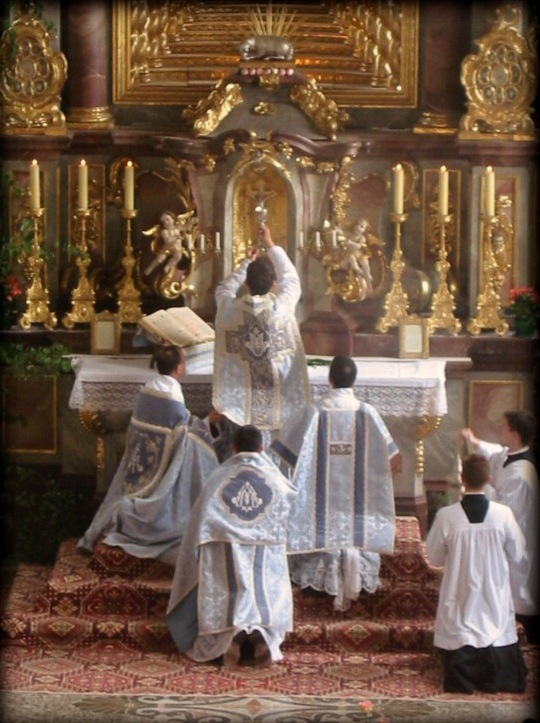
Solemn High Mass in the Tridentine form

On the eve of the release of the motu proprio Summorum Pontificum, the 7 July 2007 document by which Pope Benedict XVI declared that the 1962 Roman Missal could still be used privately by any priest of the Latin Church and that enacted looser conditions for its use in celebrating Mass with a congregation, the Tridentine Mass was celebrated in France based on Pope John Paul II's motu proprio Ecclesia Dei in 132 churches or chapels with the consent of the Ordinary of the place, and in 184 places served by the Society of Saint Pius X and its affiliated communities.

On 7 July 2009, two years after the publication of the motu proprio, the Tridentine Mass was celebrated in an additional 72 chapels and churches with the consent of the Ordinary of the place, an increase of 55%. The number of places served by the Society of Saint Pius X remained 184, as before.

== Notes ==
This article incorporates text from the entry France in the public-domain Catholic Encyclopedia of 1910.
