= Cunac =

- Commune
- Location of Cunac
- Location within France Location within Occitanie
- Coordinates: 43°55′46″N 2°13′17″E
- Country: France
- Region: Occitania
- Department: Tarn
- Arrondissement: Albi
- Canton: Saint-Juéry
- Intercommunality: CA Albigeois

Government
  - Mayor (2020–2026): Marc Venzal
- Area^{1}: 6.38 km^{2} (2.46 sq mi)
- Elevation: 245 m (804 ft)
- Highest elevation: 291 m (955 ft)
- Lowest elevation: 191 m (627 ft)
- Population (2023): 1,626
  - Density: 255/km^{2} (660/sq mi)
- Time zone: UTC+01:00 (CET)
  - Summer (DST): UTC+02:00 (CEST)
- INSEE/Postal code: 81074 /81990
- ^{1} French Land Register data, which excludes lakes, ponds, glaciers > 1 km^{2} (0.386 sq mi or 247 acres) and river estuaries.

Cunac (French pronunciation: [kynak]) is a commune in the Tarn department in southern France.

Cunac marks the most easterly part of the Gaillac wine region.

== See also ==
- Communes of the Tarn department
