= Puygouzon =

- Commune
- Coat of arms
- Location of Puygouzon
- Location within France Location within Occitanie
- Coordinates: 43°53′35″N 2°10′12″E
- Country: France
- Region: Occitania
- Department: Tarn
- Arrondissement: Albi
- Canton: Albi-2
- Intercommunality: CA Albigeois

Government
  - Mayor (2020–2026): Thierry Dufour
- Area^{1}: 19.96 km^{2} (7.71 sq mi)
- Elevation: 200 m (660 ft)
- Highest elevation: 333 m (1,093 ft)
- Lowest elevation: 182 m (597 ft)
- Population (2023): 3,548
  - Density: 177.8/km^{2} (460.4/sq mi)
- Time zone: UTC+01:00 (CET)
  - Summer (DST): UTC+02:00 (CEST)
- INSEE/Postal code: 81218 /81990
- ^{1} French Land Register data, which excludes lakes, ponds, glaciers > 1 km^{2} (0.386 sq mi or 247 acres) and river estuaries.

Puygouzon (French pronunciation: [pɥiɡuzɔ̃]; Languedocien: Puòggoson) is a commune in the Tarn department in southern France. On 1 January 2017, the former commune of Labastide-Dénat was merged into Puygouzon.

== Population ==
The population data below refer to the commune in its geography as of January 2025.

Historical population
Year	Pop.	±% p.a.
1968	920	—
1975	1,607	+8.29%
1982	2,221	+4.73%
1990	2,841	+3.13%
1999	2,961	+0.46%
2007	3,185	+0.92%
2012	3,327	+0.88%
2017	3,461	+0.79%
2023	3,548	+0.41%
Source: INSEE

== See also ==
- Communes of the Tarn department
