= Communauté d'agglomération de l'Albigeois =

Albigeois
- Communauté d'agglomération
- Location of Albigeois within the department
- Coordinates: 43°55′N 02°10′E
- Country: France
- Region: Occitania
- Department: Tarn
- No. of communes: {{{nbcomm}}}
- Established: 2011
- Area: 208.9 km^{2} (80.7 sq mi)
- Population (2019): 82,351
  - Density: 394.2/km^{2} (1,021/sq mi)
- Website: www.grand-albigeois.fr

Communauté d'agglomération de l'Albigeois is the communauté d'agglomération, an intercommunal structure, centred on the city of Albi. It is located in the Tarn department, in the Occitania region, southern France. Created in 2011, its seat is in Albi. Its area is 208.9 km^{2}. Its population was 82,351 in 2019, of which 48,902 in Albi proper.

== Composition ==
The communauté d'agglomération consists of the following 16 communes:

1. Albi
2. Arthès
3. Cambon
4. Carlus
5. Castelnau-de-Lévis
6. Cunac
7. Dénat
8. Fréjairolles
9. Lescure-d'Albigeois
10. Marssac-sur-Tarn
11. Puygouzon
12. Rouffiac
13. Saint-Juéry
14. Saliès
15. Le Sequestre
16. Terssac
