= Dénat =

- Commune
- Coat of arms
- Location of Dénat
- Location within France Location within Occitanie
- Coordinates: 43°50′49″N 2°12′18″E
- Country: France
- Region: Occitania
- Department: Tarn
- Arrondissement: Albi
- Canton: Saint-Juéry
- Intercommunality: CA Albigeois

Government
  - Mayor (2020–2026): Olivier Oustric
- Area^{1}: 15.01 km^{2} (5.80 sq mi)
- Elevation: 294 m (965 ft)
- Highest elevation: 325 m (1,066 ft)
- Lowest elevation: 211 m (692 ft)
- Population (2023): 864
  - Density: 57.6/km^{2} (149/sq mi)
- Time zone: UTC+01:00 (CET)
  - Summer (DST): UTC+02:00 (CEST)
- INSEE/Postal code: 81079 /81120
- ^{1} French Land Register data, which excludes lakes, ponds, glaciers > 1 km^{2} (0.386 sq mi or 247 acres) and river estuaries.

Dénat (French pronunciation: [dena]; Occitan: Denat) is a commune in the Tarn department in southern France.

== See also ==
- Communes of the Tarn department
