= Fréjairolles =

- Commune
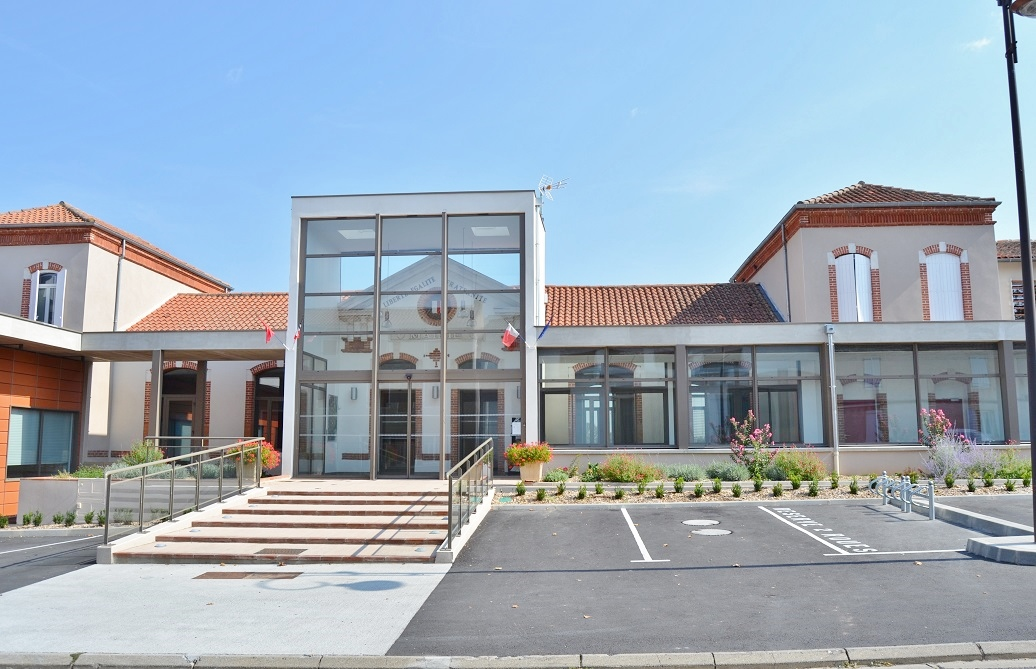
- Town hall

- Coat of arms
- Location of Fréjairolles
- Location within France Location within Occitanie
- Coordinates: 43°52′52″N 2°13′55″E
- Country: France
- Region: Occitania
- Department: Tarn
- Arrondissement: Albi
- Canton: Saint-Juéry
- Intercommunality: CA Albigeois

Government
  - Mayor (2020–2026): Jérôme Casimir
- Area^{1}: 17.41 km^{2} (6.72 sq mi)
- Elevation: 285 m (935 ft)
- Highest elevation: 333 m (1,093 ft)
- Lowest elevation: 216 m (709 ft)
- Population (2023): 1,351
  - Density: 77.60/km^{2} (201.0/sq mi)
- Time zone: UTC+01:00 (CET)
  - Summer (DST): UTC+02:00 (CEST)
- INSEE/Postal code: 81097 /81990
- ^{1} French Land Register data, which excludes lakes, ponds, glaciers > 1 km^{2} (0.386 sq mi or 247 acres) and river estuaries.

Fréjairolles (French pronunciation: [fʁeʒɛʁɔl]; Occitan: Frejairòlas) is a commune in the Tarn department in southern France.

== See also ==
- Communes of the Tarn department
