= Arthès =

- Commune
- Coat of arms
- Location of Arthès
- Location within France Location within Occitanie
- Coordinates: 43°57′18″N 2°12′32″E
- Country: France
- Region: Occitania
- Department: Tarn
- Arrondissement: Albi
- Canton: Saint-Juéry
- Intercommunality: CA Albigeois

Government
  - Mayor (2020–2026): Jean-Marc Farré
- Area^{1}: 10.01 km^{2} (3.86 sq mi)
- Elevation: 150 m (490 ft)
- Highest elevation: 342 m (1,122 ft)
- Lowest elevation: 157 m (515 ft)
- Population (2023): 2,528
  - Density: 252.5/km^{2} (654.1/sq mi)
- Time zone: UTC+01:00 (CET)
  - Summer (DST): UTC+02:00 (CEST)
- INSEE/Postal code: 81018 /81160
- ^{1} French Land Register data, which excludes lakes, ponds, glaciers > 1 km^{2} (0.386 sq mi or 247 acres) and river estuaries.

Arthès (French pronunciation: [aʁtɛs]; Occitan: Artés) is a commune of the Tarn department in southern France. It lies on the river Tarn, 6 km northeast of Albi.

== Population ==
Historical population
Year	Pop.	±% p.a.
1968	1,644	—
1975	1,904	+2.12%
1982	2,041	+1.00%
1990	2,134	+0.56%
1999	2,164	+0.16%
2007	2,367	+1.13%
2012	2,507	+1.16%
2017	2,498	−0.07%
2023	2,528	+0.20%
Source: INSEE

== See also ==
- Communes of the Tarn department
