= Canton of Saint-Juéry =

Coordinates: 43.95°N 2.21°E

The canton of Saint-Juéry is an administrative division of the Tarn department, southern France. It was created at the French canton reorganisation which came into effect in March 2015, seated in Saint-Juéry.

The canton consists of the following communes:

1. Arthès
2. Cambon
3. Cunac
4. Dénat
5. Fréjairolles
6. Saint-Juéry
