= Cambon =

- Commune
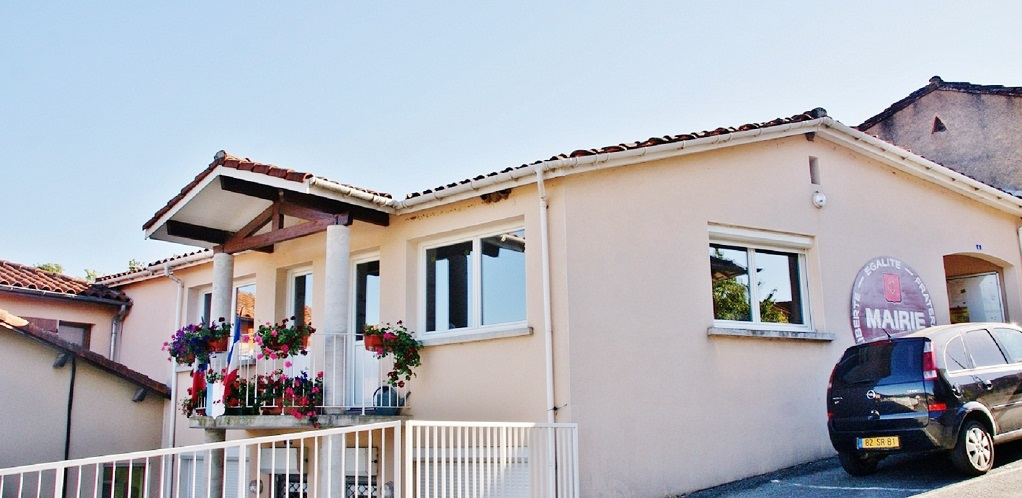
- Cambon Town hall

- Coat of arms
- Location of Cambon
- Location within France Location within Occitanie
- Coordinates: 43°54′49″N 2°12′46″E
- Country: France
- Region: Occitania
- Department: Tarn
- Arrondissement: Albi
- Canton: Saint-Juéry
- Intercommunality: CA Albigeois

Government
  - Mayor (2020–2026): Philippe Granier
- Area^{1}: 7.71 km^{2} (2.98 sq mi)
- Elevation: 210 m (690 ft)
- Highest elevation: 333 m (1,093 ft)
- Lowest elevation: 189 m (620 ft)
- Population (2023): 2,127
  - Density: 276/km^{2} (715/sq mi)
- Time zone: UTC+01:00 (CET)
  - Summer (DST): UTC+02:00 (CEST)
- INSEE/Postal code: 81052 /81990
- ^{1} French Land Register data, which excludes lakes, ponds, glaciers > 1 km^{2} (0.386 sq mi or 247 acres) and river estuaries.

Cambon (French pronunciation: [kɑ̃bɔ̃]) is a commune in the Tarn department in southern France.

== Population ==
Historical population
Year	Pop.	±% p.a.
1968	361	—
1975	530	+5.64%
1982	818	+6.40%
1990	1,183	+4.72%
1999	1,383	+1.75%
2007	1,784	+3.23%
2012	2,007	+2.38%
2017	2,121	+1.11%
2023	2,127	+0.05%
Source: INSEE

== See also ==
- Communes of the Tarn department
