= Pierre Bernard (Tarn politician) =

French politician (1934–2020)

Member of the French National Assembly for Tarn's 1st constituency
- In office 10 October 1980 – 1 April 1993
- Preceded by: André Billoux
- Succeeded by: Paul Quilès

General Councillor for the Canton of Valence-Albigeois
- In office 1982–2001
- Preceded by: Pierre Nespoulos
- Succeeded by: André Maille

Mayor of Trébas
- In office 1970–2001
- Succeeded by: Patricia Bousquet

Personal details
- Born: 6 June 1934 Alban, France
- Died: 5 December 2020 (aged 86) Trébas, France
- Party: PS

Pierre Bernard (6 June 1934 – 5 December 2020) was a French politician.

== Biography ==
Mayor of Trébas from 1970 to 2001, Bernard served as a General Councillor for the Canton of Valence-Albigeois from 1982 to 2001. He succeeded André Billoux as a member of the National Assembly following Billoux's death. He was elected in 1981 and held his position until 1993, when he decided not to stand for reelection, allowing Paul Quilès to succeed him.

Bernard chaired the Syndicat départemental d'énergies du Tarn until 2014. In 2015, he published his autobiography, titled Trébas, en cinquante ans de ma vie.

Pierre Bernard died in Trébas on 5 December 2020 at the age of 86.
