= Padiès =

- Commune
- Coat of arms
- Location of Padiès
- Location within France Location within Occitanie
- Coordinates: 44°02′35″N 2°21′50″E
- Country: France
- Region: Occitania
- Department: Tarn
- Arrondissement: Albi
- Canton: Carmaux-1 Le Ségala
- Intercommunality: Val 81

Government
  - Mayor (2020–2026): Françoise Barrau
- Area^{1}: 14.69 km^{2} (5.67 sq mi)
- Elevation: 500 m (1,600 ft)
- Highest elevation: 552 m (1,811 ft)
- Lowest elevation: 340 m (1,120 ft)
- Population (2023): 151
  - Density: 10.3/km^{2} (26.6/sq mi)
- Time zone: UTC+01:00 (CET)
  - Summer (DST): UTC+02:00 (CEST)
- INSEE/Postal code: 81199 /81340
- ^{1} French Land Register data, which excludes lakes, ponds, glaciers > 1 km^{2} (0.386 sq mi or 247 acres) and river estuaries.

Padiès (French pronunciation: [padjɛs]; Occitan: Padièrs) is a commune in the Tarn department in southern France.

The Château de Padiès is situated in the commune of Lempaut, 62 km to the southwest of Padiès.

== Population ==
Historical population
Year	Pop.	±% p.a.
1968	337	—
1975	300	−1.65%
1982	264	−1.81%
1990	199	−3.47%
1999	199	+0.00%
2007	192	−0.45%
2012	197	+0.52%
2017	191	−0.62%
2023	151	−3.84%
Source: INSEE

== Geography ==
The Cérou forms most of the commune's northwestern border.

== See also ==
- Communes of the Tarn department
