= Billoux =

Billoux is a surname. Notable people with the surname include:

- André Billoux (1928–1980), French politician
- François Billoux (1903–1978), French politician
