= Chicourt =

- Commune
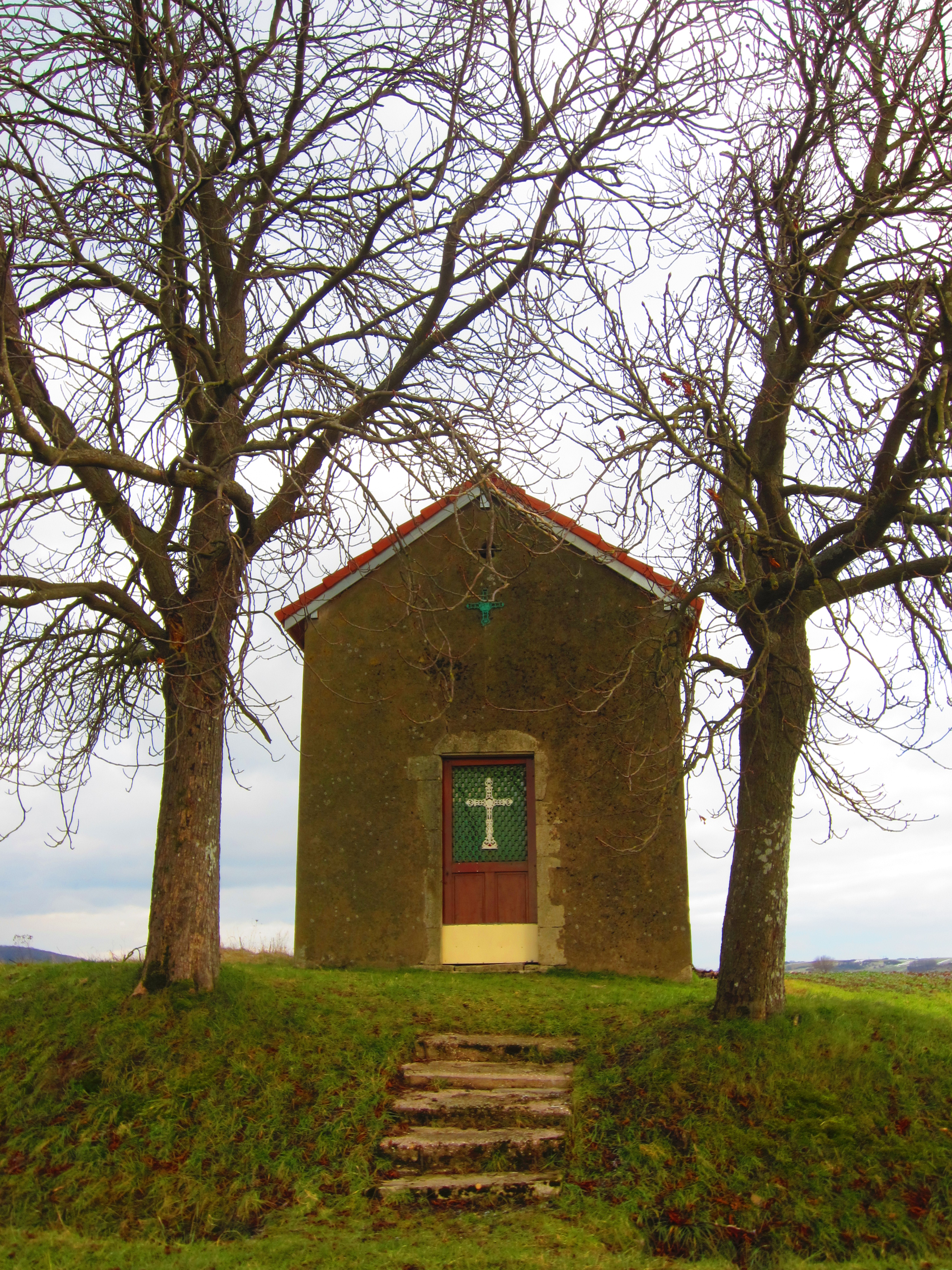
- Chapel

- Coat of arms
- Location of Chicourt
- Location within France Location within Grand Est
- Coordinates: 48°55′05″N 6°30′19″E
- Country: France
- Region: Grand Est
- Department: Moselle
- Arrondissement: Sarrebourg-Château-Salins
- Canton: Le Saulnois
- Intercommunality: CC du Saulnois

Government
  - Mayor (2020–2026): Yves Barthelemy
- Area^{1}: 5.52 km^{2} (2.13 sq mi)
- Highest elevation: 340 m (1,120 ft)
- Lowest elevation: 239 m (784 ft)
- Population (2023): 88
  - Density: 16/km^{2} (41/sq mi)
- Time zone: UTC+01:00 (CET)
  - Summer (DST): UTC+02:00 (CEST)
- INSEE/Postal code: 57141 /57590
- ^{1} French Land Register data, which excludes lakes, ponds, glaciers > 1 km^{2} (0.386 sq mi or 247 acres) and river estuaries.

Chicourt (French pronunciation: [ʃikuʁ]; German: Diexingen) is a commune in the Moselle department in Grand Est in north-eastern France.

== Geography ==
Chicourt lies in Saulnois, 34 kilometers northeast of Nancy, 32 kilometers southeast of Metz, and 26 kilometers southwest of Saint-Avold. Neighboring towns are Château-Bréhain in the southeast, Oron in the south west, Frémery in the northwest, and Villers-sur-Nied in the Northeast. Chicourt sits at an altitude between 239 and 340 meters above sea level. The area of the commune is around 5.52 square kilometers (552 hectares). The commune's territory is bounded on the south by the Nied française river.

== Planning ==
=== Typology ===
Chicourt is a rural commune, belonging to a group of municipalities with low or very low density as defined by the INSEE (National Institute of Statistics and Economic Studies). (This is according to the zoning of rural and urban municipalities published in November 2020, in application of the new definition of rurality validated on 14 November 2020 by the interministerial committee of ruralities.)

=== Land Use ===
The land use in the commune, as it appears in the European database Corine Land Cover (CLC), is marked by the importance of agricultural land (88.3% in 2018), a proportion identical to that of 1990 (88.4%). The detailed breakdown in 2018 is as follows: arable land (60%), prairie (28.4%), forests (11.6%).

The National Institute of Geographic and Forest Information (IGN) also provides an online tool to compare the evolution over time of land use in the commune (or in territories of different scales). Several periods are accessible in the form of maps or aerial photos: the Cassini map (18th century), the staff map (1820–66), and the current period (1950 to today).

== Place Name ==
Chicourt was recorded in 1121 and 1180 as Diekesinga. (1476: Chiecourt.) Ernest Nègre acted on the assumption that the place name was a compound of the Germanic name Cadulus and the medieval Latin word curtis (homestead) and therefore means "Homestead of Cadulus."

- Diekesinga (1121 and 1180), Diekesingen (1121), Cheecourt (1296), Chiecourt (1337), Chiefcourt (1375), Chiecourt (1476).
- formerly Tichecort: Tiche- (German) + -cort (court).
- Diexingen from 1915 to 1918 (during annexation), Dixingen from 1940 to 1944 (during Nazi occupation).

== History ==
Today, Chicourt is part of the canton of Le Saulnois.

The fief of Chicourt belonged to the châtellenie of Amance and was former property of the priory of Saint-Nicolas-de-Port. Until the beginning of the 17th century, there was a Benedictine priory in Chicourt.

This village dates from a rather distant time: in 1335, it, along with several other localities, was dedicated by Adémar, the Bishop of Metz, to Pierre de Bar, master of Pierrefort.

in 1594, Chicourt looked to the provost of Amance in the bailiwick of Nancy; then from 1751 to the bailiwick of Château-Salins under the customary law of Lorraine.

The fiefdom of Neufchère was located in what is today the municipality of Chicourt, about halfway to Villers-sur-Nied. It was noted in 1594 in the chartulary of the Salival Abbey (today part of the Moyenvic commune) and appears as Neuf-Chaire on a 1780s map by Jean Dominique, Count of Cassini (1748–1845).

From 1790 to 2015, Chicourt was a commune in the former canton of Delme.

In 1793, Chicourt received the status of a commune in the course of the French Revolution, and in 1801 received the right to local self-government. From 1801 to 1871, it belonged to the former Département Meurthe, which was then renamed as the Département Meurthe & Moselle. in 1871, the commune was incorporated into the newly created German imperial territory of Alsace-Lorraine due to territorial changes that were a consequence of the Franco-Prussian War (1870–71). The imperial territory of Alsace-Lorraine existed until the end of the First World War (1914–18) and was then dissolved. As a Francophone village, Chicourt was one of the last 247 municipalities whose name was Germanized on 2 September 1915, during the First World War. The name was changed to "Diexingen" and was the official place name until 1918. At that time, Chicourt was in the Département Moselle. This change was retained in 1918 when Moselle was again granted to France.

== Demographics ==
Changes in the number of inhabitants are documented in the population censuses carried out in the commune since 1793. From 2006, the legal population of municipalities has been published annually by INSEE. The census is now based on an annual collection of information from each municipality in turn over a period of five years. For communes with less than 10,000 inhabitants, a census of the entire population is carried out every five years, and the official population numbers in intervening years is estimated by extrapolation. For Chicourt, the first exhaustive census falling under the new system was carried out in 2005.

In 2018, the commune had 93 inhabitants, an increase of 9.41% compared to 2013 (Moselle: -0.32%, France excluding Mayotte: + 2.36%).

== Local Culture and Heritage ==
=== Heraldry ===
The coat of arms of the commune is red, bearing a silver hatchment in the middle and showing three golden balls (besants), of which two are in the upper part and one at the peak. The silver hatchment comes from the coat of arms of the castellany of Amance. The golden balls are attributes of the patron saint Nicholas of Myra.

=== Places and Monuments ===
- Église Saint-Nicolas (1831).
- Chapelle Notre-Dame de Neufchère.

== Infrastructure ==
The nearest airport is Metz-Nancy-Lorraine Airport, 19.7 kilometers northwest of Chicourt.

== See also ==
- Communes of the Moselle department
