= Lucien Fabre =

French writer

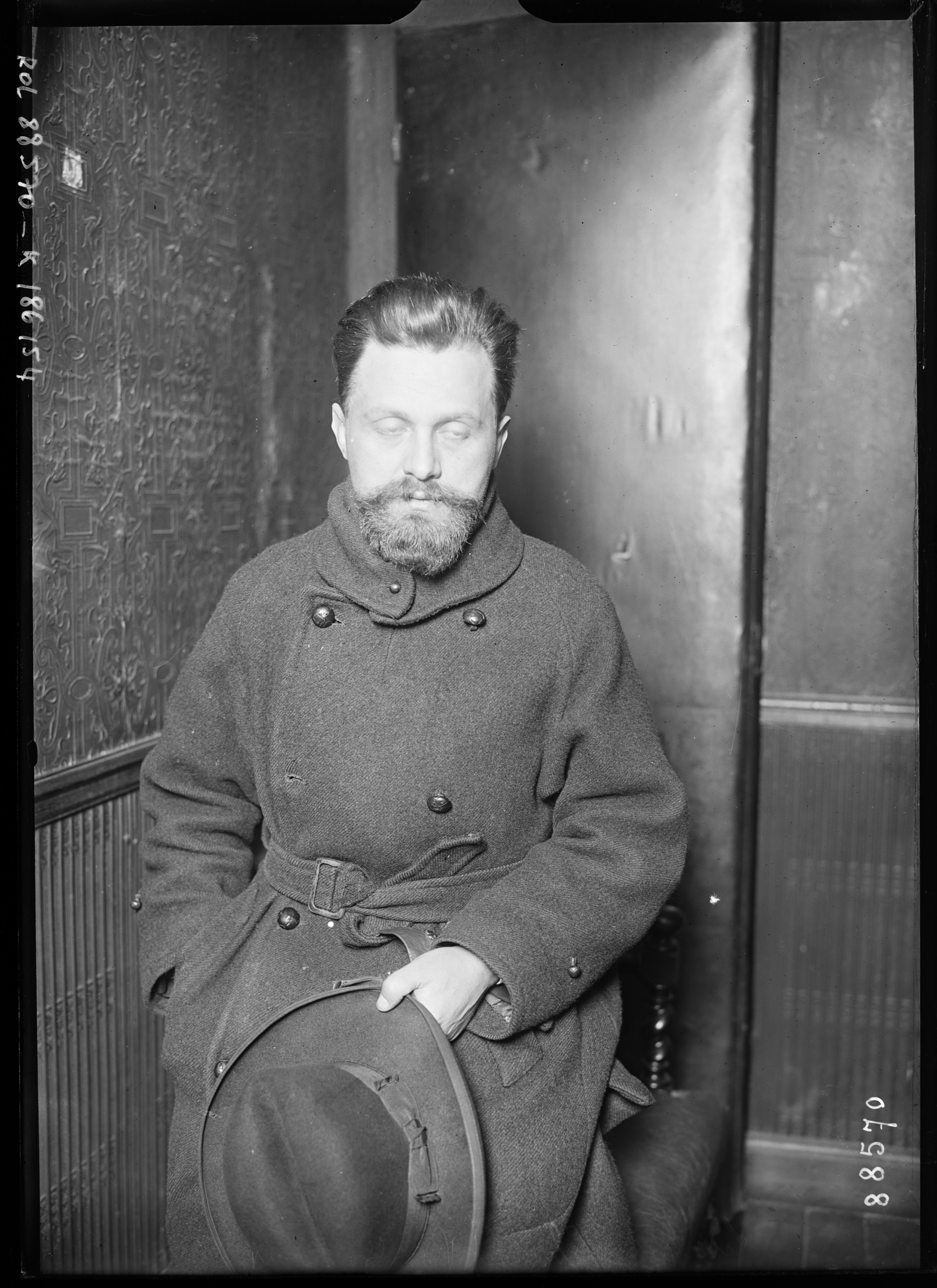
- Born: 14 February 1889; Pampelonne, France
- Died: 26 November 1952 (aged 63)
- Writing career
- Notable work: Einstein's theories: a new face in the world

Lucien Fabre (14 February 1889 – 26 November 1952) was a French novelist, essayist, and poet.

== Personal life ==
Fabre was born on 14 February 1889 in France's River Garonne region in Pampelonne, and died in Paris on 26 November 1952.

== Career ==
=== Publication of Einstein's theories ===
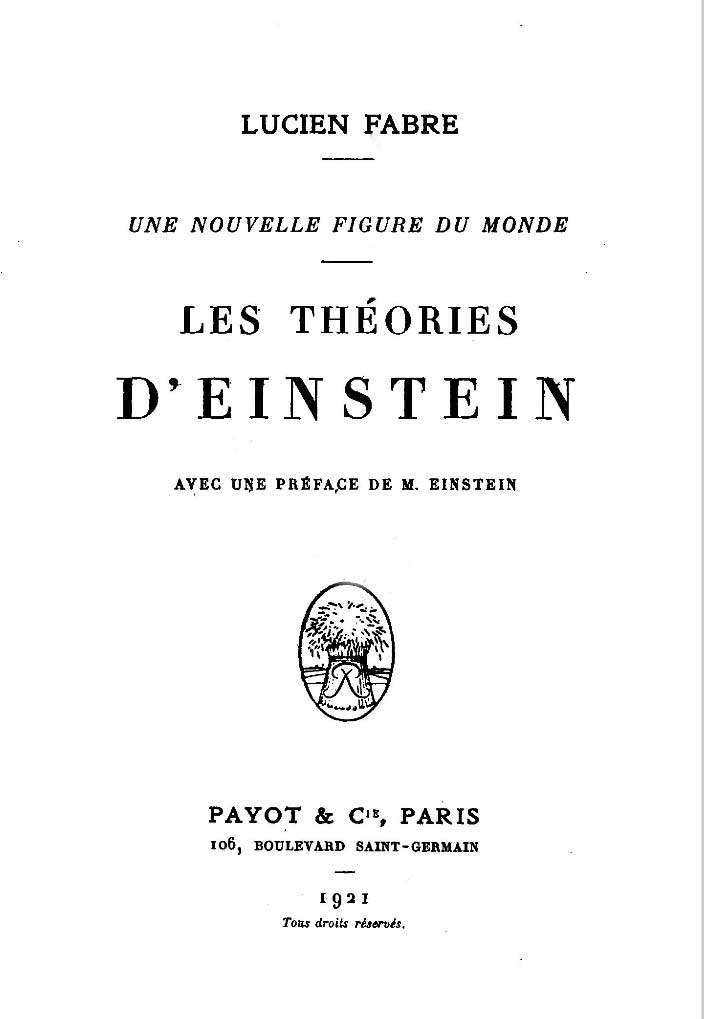
Lucien Fabre's Einstein book from 1921 with a fake "préface de M. Einstein".

Fabre was a businessman, artist, and friend of the poet Paul Valéry, Leon-Paul Fargue, and the violinist Jacques Thibaud. He associated with socialists, particularly Léon Blum; in Carmaux he met Jean Jaurès, a socialist politician from the same region as Fabre. Fabre married a young woman of one of the richest families of the Champ de Mars in Paris.

During 1921, Fabre published a popular science book titled Einstein's theories: a new face in the world with a "foreword" attributed to Albert Einstein. The preface text was taken from a letter by Einstein to Maurice Solovine, which was later purchased by Fabre. After publication, Einstein complained to the editor, resulting in the preface of the book being withdrawn for the second edition (1922), and replaced with a derogatory comment directed at Einstein

Fabre is now largely forgotten, probably because of his extreme eclecticism which is no longer popular; a characteristic which made his style difficult to read. He kept all his life an affection for country life. Several of his books recreate the atmosphere and character which prevailed in this austere and poor land.

== Awards ==
- 1923 Prix Goncourt for Rabevel ou le Mal des ardents.
- 1948 Grand Prix of Histoire Académie française for Jeanne d'Arc.

== Works ==
- Les théories d'Einstein: une nouvelle figure du monde Paris: Payot, 1921.
- Bassesse de Venise, précédé de La Traversée de l'Europe en avion et du légat (1924). Gallimard (essays).
- Le Ciel de l'oiseleur (1934), Gallimard (essays).
- Connaissance de la déesse (1924), préface de Paul Valéry. Gallimard (poetry).
- Le Paradis des amants (1931), Collection blanche, Gallimard (novel).
- Rabevel ou le mal des ardents (1923), trois volumes, Collection blanche, Gallimard (novel).
- Le Rire et les rieurs (1929), Collection blanche, Gallimard (essays).
- Le Tarramagnou (1925), Collection blanche, Gallimard (novel).
- Vanikoro (1925). Gallimard (poetry).
- Dieu est innocent: tragédie, Lucien Fabre, Paul Valéry, Nagel, 1946.
- Jeanne d'Arc (1948), Tallandier.
