= Mouzieys-Panens =

- Commune
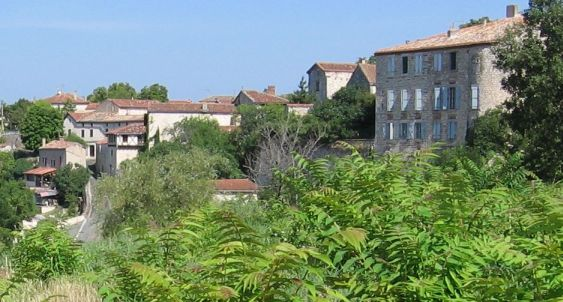
- A general view of Mouzieys
- Location of Mouzieys-Panens
- Location within France Location within Occitanie
- Coordinates: 44°05′36″N 1°56′00″E
- Country: France
- Region: Occitania
- Department: Tarn
- Arrondissement: Albi
- Canton: Carmaux-2 Vallée du Cérou

Government
  - Mayor (2020–2026): Claude Blanc
- Area^{1}: 13.13 km^{2} (5.07 sq mi)
- Elevation: 260 m (850 ft)
- Highest elevation: 328 m (1,076 ft)
- Lowest elevation: 150 m (490 ft)
- Population (2023): 256
  - Density: 19.5/km^{2} (50.5/sq mi)
- Time zone: UTC+01:00 (CET)
  - Summer (DST): UTC+02:00 (CEST)
- INSEE/Postal code: 81191 /81170
- ^{1} French Land Register data, which excludes lakes, ponds, glaciers > 1 km^{2} (0.386 sq mi or 247 acres) and river estuaries.

Mouzieys-Panens is a commune in the Tarn department in southern France.

== Geography ==
The commune is traversed by the Cérou river.

== Monuments ==
The village is dominated by a castle that was built in the 12th century by Guillaume de Cadolhe. It was later fortified during the Hundred Years' War. It served as an outlook post for Cordes-sur-Ciel. In 1566, the castle came into possession of Count Bernard de Rabastens. It was the scene of battles and was set to fire. In the 18th century the castle was rebuilt and, now demilitarised, it serves as mairie.

Saint Michael's Church at the bottom of the village is a classified monument.

== See also ==
- Communes of the Tarn department
