= Saint-Julien-Gaulène =

- Commune
- Coat of arms
- Location of Saint-Julien-Gaulène
- Location within France Location within Occitanie
- Coordinates: 43°59′25″N 2°20′48″E
- Country: France
- Region: Occitania
- Department: Tarn
- Arrondissement: Albi
- Canton: Carmaux-1 Le Ségala
- Intercommunality: Val 81

Government
  - Mayor (2020–2026): Ghislaine Gomez
- Area^{1}: 11.84 km^{2} (4.57 sq mi)
- Elevation: 400 m (1,300 ft)
- Highest elevation: 456 m (1,496 ft)
- Lowest elevation: 300 m (980 ft)
- Population (2023): 220
  - Density: 19/km^{2} (48/sq mi)
- Time zone: UTC+01:00 (CET)
  - Summer (DST): UTC+02:00 (CEST)
- INSEE/Postal code: 81259 /81340
- ^{1} French Land Register data, which excludes lakes, ponds, glaciers > 1 km^{2} (0.386 sq mi or 247 acres) and river estuaries.

Saint-Julien-Gaulène (French pronunciation: [sɛ̃ ʒyljɛ̃ ɡolɛn]; Languedocien: Sent Julian e Gaulena) is a commune in the Tarn department in southern France.

Ernest Nègre (born 11 October 1907 in Saint-Julien-Gaulène, died 15 April 2000 in Toulouse) was a French toponymist.

== See also ==
- Communes of the Tarn department
