= Lédas-et-Penthiès =

- Commune
- Coat of arms
- Location of Lédas-et-Penthiès
- Location within France Location within Occitanie
- Coordinates: 44°05′09″N 2°23′02″E
- Country: France
- Region: Occitania
- Department: Tarn
- Arrondissement: Albi
- Canton: Carmaux-1 Le Ségala
- Intercommunality: Val 81

Government
  - Mayor (2020–2026): Marie-Claude Campagnaro
- Area^{1}: 12.53 km^{2} (4.84 sq mi)
- Elevation: 490 m (1,610 ft)
- Highest elevation: 552 m (1,811 ft)
- Lowest elevation: 406 m (1,332 ft)
- Population (2023): 163
  - Density: 13.0/km^{2} (33.7/sq mi)
- Time zone: UTC+01:00 (CET)
  - Summer (DST): UTC+02:00 (CEST)
- INSEE/Postal code: 81141 /81340
- ^{1} French Land Register data, which excludes lakes, ponds, glaciers > 1 km^{2} (0.386 sq mi or 247 acres) and river estuaries.

Lédas-et-Penthiès is a commune in the Tarn department in southern France.

== Geography ==
The commune is traversed by the Cérou river.

== See also ==
- Communes of the Tarn department
