= Jouqueviel =

- Commune
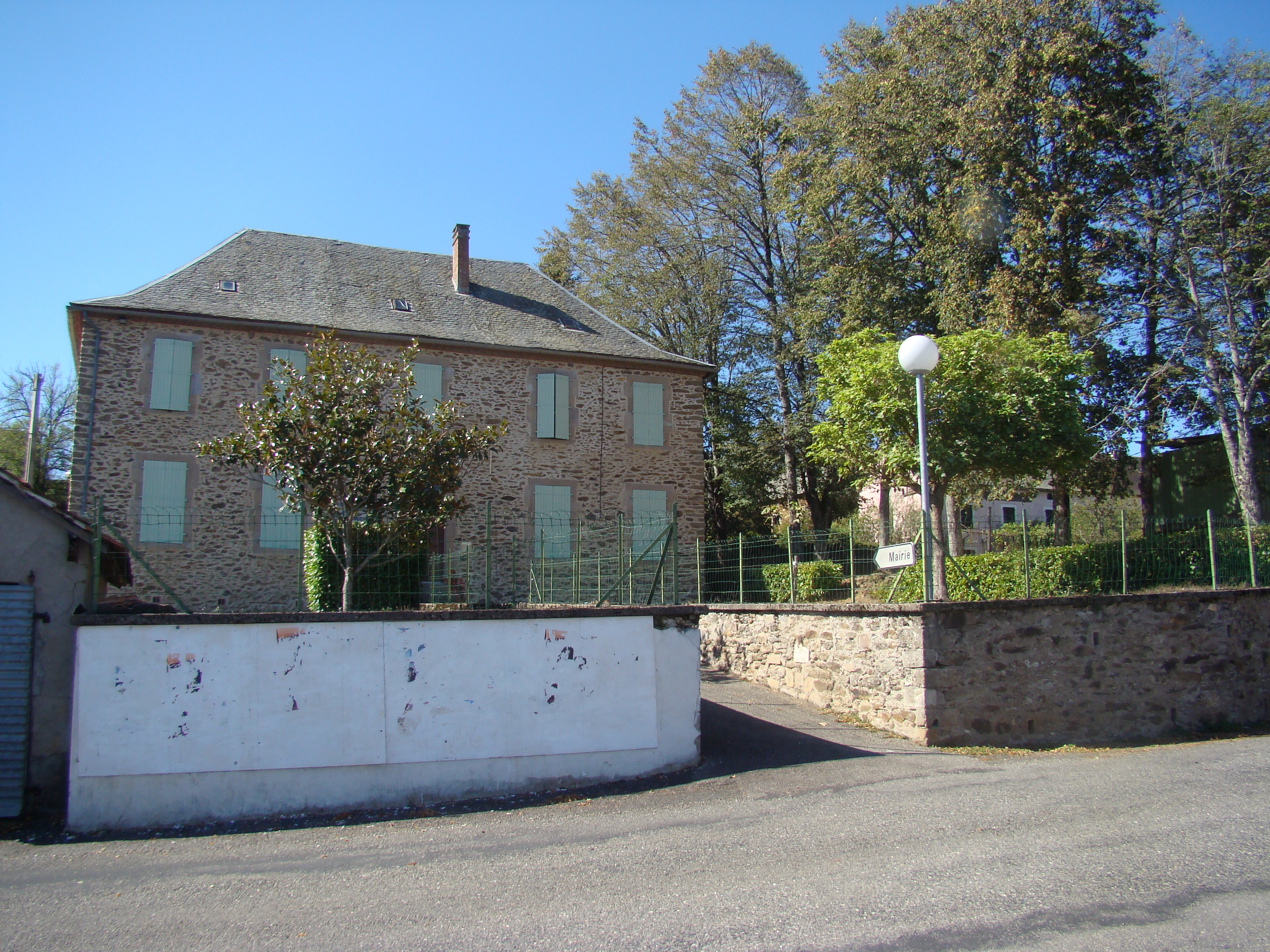
- The town hall in Jouqueviel

- Coat of arms
- Location of Jouqueviel
- Location within France Location within Occitanie
- Coordinates: 44°11′09″N 2°08′20″E
- Country: France
- Region: Occitania
- Department: Tarn
- Arrondissement: Albi
- Canton: Carmaux-1 Le Ségala
- Intercommunality: Carmausin-Ségala

Government
  - Mayor (2020–2026): Nelly Leblond
- Area^{1}: 12.15 km^{2} (4.69 sq mi)
- Elevation: 500 m (1,600 ft)
- Highest elevation: 531 m (1,742 ft)
- Lowest elevation: 196 m (643 ft)
- Population (2023): 100
  - Density: 8.2/km^{2} (21/sq mi)
- Time zone: UTC+01:00 (CET)
  - Summer (DST): UTC+02:00 (CEST)
- INSEE/Postal code: 81110 /81190
- ^{1} French Land Register data, which excludes lakes, ponds, glaciers > 1 km^{2} (0.386 sq mi or 247 acres) and river estuaries.

Jouqueviel (French pronunciation: [ʒukvjɛl]; Occitan: Jocavièlh) is a commune in the Tarn department and Occitanie region of southern France.

== See also ==
- Communes of the Tarn department
