= Canton of Carmaux-1 Le Ségala =

Coordinates: 44.06°N 2.16°E

The canton of Carmaux-1 Le Ségala is an administrative division of the Tarn department, southern France. It was created at the French canton reorganisation which came into effect in March 2015. Its seat is in Carmaux.

It consists of the following communes:

1. Almayrac
2. Andouque
3. Assac
4. Cadix
5. Carmaux (partly)
6. Courris
7. Crespin
8. Crespinet
9. Le Dourn
10. Faussergues
11. Fraissines
12. Jouqueviel
13. Lacapelle-Pinet
14. Lédas-et-Penthiès
15. Mirandol-Bourgnounac
16. Montauriol
17. Moularès
18. Padiès
19. Pampelonne
20. Rosières
21. Saint-Cirgue
22. Sainte-Gemme
23. Saint-Grégoire
24. Saint-Jean-de-Marcel
25. Saint-Julien-Gaulène
26. Saint-Michel-Labadié
27. Saussenac
28. Sérénac
29. Tanus
30. Tréban
31. Trébas
32. Valderiès
33. Valence-d'Albigeois
