= Sainte-Gemme, Tarn =

Sainte-Gemme
- Commune
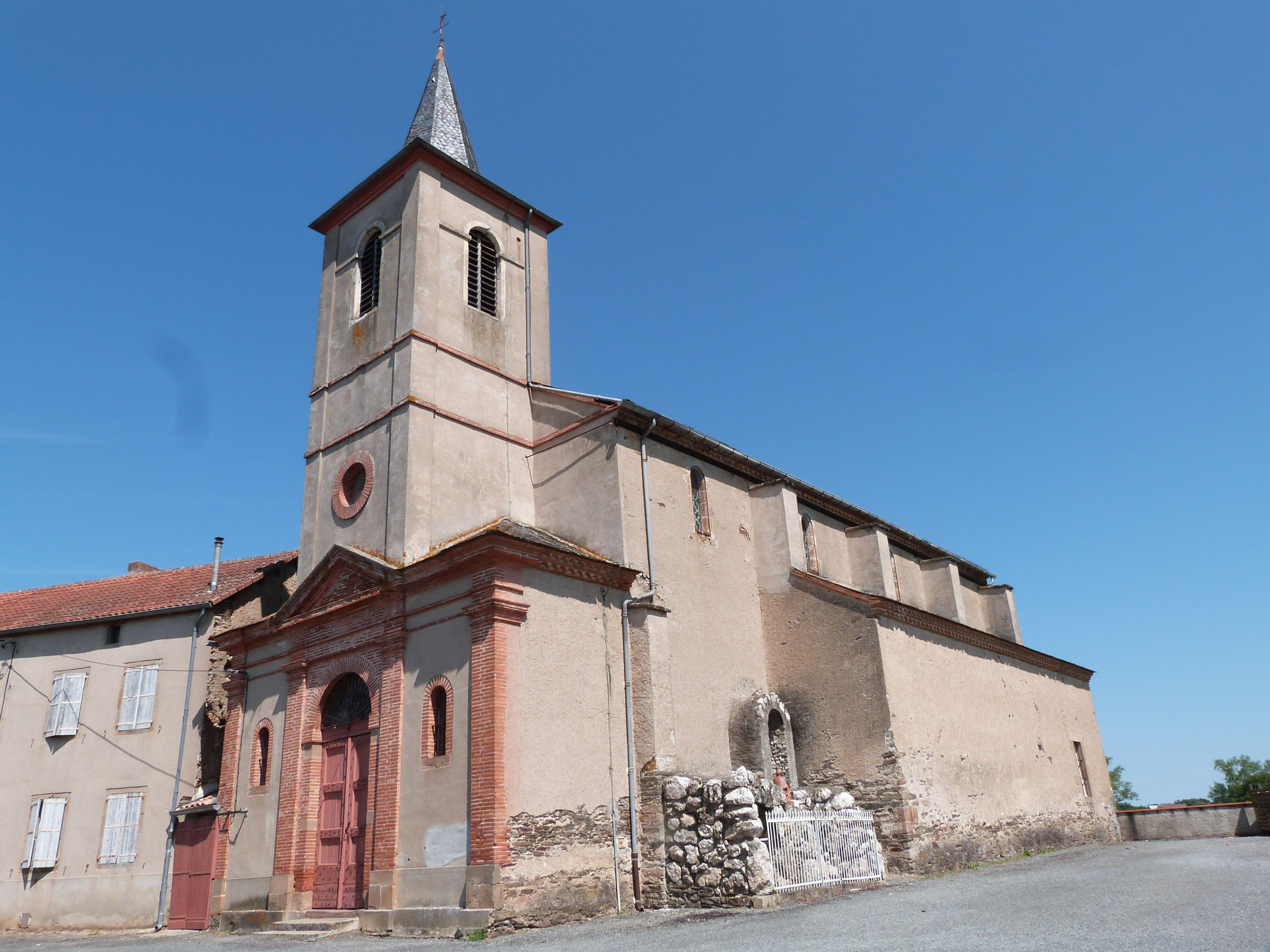
- The Saint-Cyrise church in Sainte-Gemme

- Coat of arms
- Location of Sainte-Gemme
- Location within France Location within Occitanie
- Coordinates: 44°05′24″N 2°12′04″E
- Country: France
- Region: Occitania
- Department: Tarn
- Arrondissement: Albi
- Canton: Carmaux-1 Le Ségala
- Intercommunality: Carmausin-Ségala

Government
  - Mayor (2020–2026): Jean-Claude Clergue
- Area^{1}: 20.16 km^{2} (7.78 sq mi)
- Elevation: 344 m (1,129 ft)
- Highest elevation: 394 m (1,293 ft)
- Lowest elevation: 248 m (814 ft)
- Population (2023): 836
  - Density: 41.5/km^{2} (107/sq mi)
- Time zone: UTC+01:00 (CET)
  - Summer (DST): UTC+02:00 (CEST)
- INSEE/Postal code: 81249 /81190
- ^{1} French Land Register data, which excludes lakes, ponds, glaciers > 1 km^{2} (0.386 sq mi or 247 acres) and river estuaries.

Sainte-Gemme (French pronunciation: [sɛ̃t ʒɛm]; Occitan: Santa Gèma) is a commune in the Tarn department in southern France.

== See also ==
- Communes of the Tarn department
