= Salles, Tarn =

Salles
- Commune
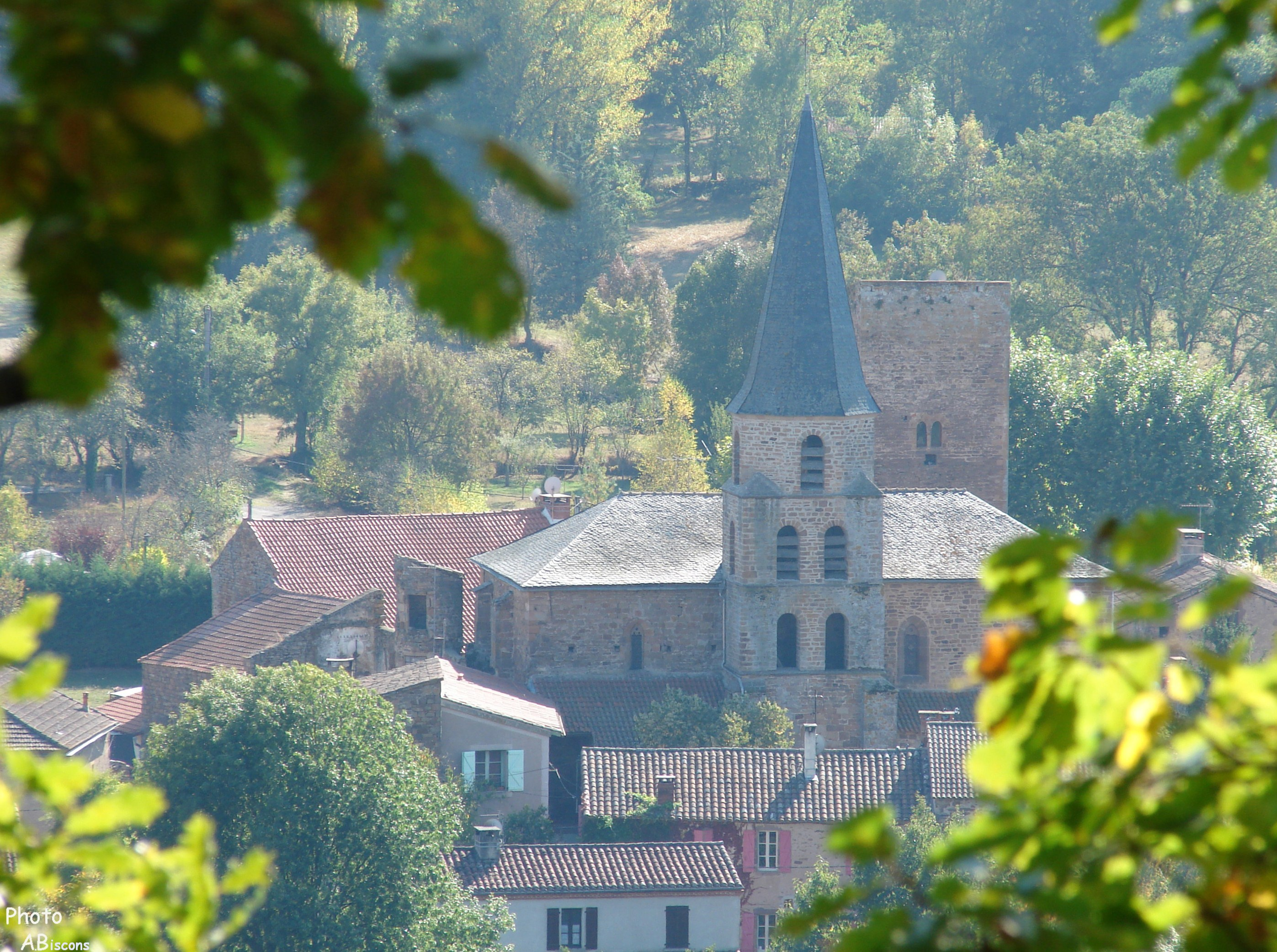
- The church and surroundings in Salles
- Location of Salles
- Location within France Location within Occitanie
- Coordinates: 44°04′26″N 2°02′12″E
- Country: France
- Region: Occitania
- Department: Tarn
- Arrondissement: Albi
- Canton: Carmaux-2 Vallée du Cérou

Government
  - Mayor (2020–2026): Thierry Douzal
- Area^{1}: 8.19 km^{2} (3.16 sq mi)
- Elevation: 192 m (630 ft)
- Highest elevation: 346 m (1,135 ft)
- Lowest elevation: 190 m (620 ft)
- Population (2023): 191
  - Density: 23.3/km^{2} (60.4/sq mi)
- Time zone: UTC+01:00 (CET)
  - Summer (DST): UTC+02:00 (CEST)
- INSEE/Postal code: 81275 /81640
- ^{1} French Land Register data, which excludes lakes, ponds, glaciers > 1 km^{2} (0.386 sq mi or 247 acres) and river estuaries.

Salles (French pronunciation: [sal]; Occitan: Salas) is a commune in the Tarn department in southern France.

== Geography ==
The commune is traversed by the Cérou river.

== See also ==
- Communes of the Tarn department
