= Andouque =

- Commune
- Location of Andouque
- Location within France Location within Occitanie
- Coordinates: 44°01′25″N 2°18′19″E
- Country: France
- Region: Occitania
- Department: Tarn
- Arrondissement: Albi
- Canton: Carmaux-1 Le Ségala
- Intercommunality: Val 81

Government
  - Mayor (2020–2026): Didier Vigroux
- Area^{1}: 26.21 km^{2} (10.12 sq mi)
- Highest elevation: 488 m (1,601 ft)
- Lowest elevation: 267 m (876 ft)
- Population (2023): 383
  - Density: 14.6/km^{2} (37.8/sq mi)
- Time zone: UTC+01:00 (CET)
  - Summer (DST): UTC+02:00 (CEST)
- INSEE/Postal code: 81013 /81350
- ^{1} French Land Register data, which excludes lakes, ponds, glaciers > 1 km^{2} (0.386 sq mi or 247 acres) and river estuaries.

Andouque (French pronunciation: [ɑ̃duk]; Occitan: Andoca) is a commune in the Tarn department in southern France.

== Geography ==
The commune is traversed by the Cérou river.

== See also ==
- Communes of the Tarn department
