= Tréban =

- Commune
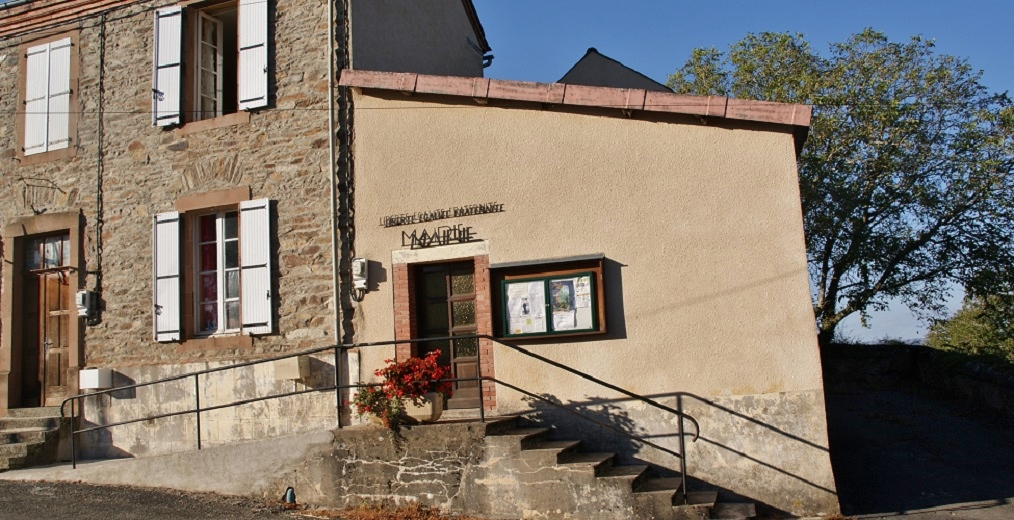
- Tréban Town hall
- Location of Tréban
- Location within France Location within Occitanie
- Coordinates: 44°05′42″N 2°20′41″E
- Country: France
- Region: Occitania
- Department: Tarn
- Arrondissement: Albi
- Canton: Carmaux-1 Le Ségala

Government
  - Mayor (2020–2026): Jacqueline Delpoux
- Area^{1}: 3.17 km^{2} (1.22 sq mi)
- Elevation: 496 m (1,627 ft)
- Highest elevation: 590 m (1,940 ft)
- Lowest elevation: 419 m (1,375 ft)
- Population (2023): 59
  - Density: 19/km^{2} (48/sq mi)
- Time zone: UTC+01:00 (CET)
  - Summer (DST): UTC+02:00 (CEST)
- INSEE/Postal code: 81302 /81190
- ^{1} French Land Register data, which excludes lakes, ponds, glaciers > 1 km^{2} (0.386 sq mi or 247 acres) and river estuaries.

Tréban (French pronunciation: [tʁebɑ̃]; Occitan: Trevan, meaning ghost) is a commune in the Tarn department in southern France.

== See also ==
- Communes of the Tarn department
