= Saussenac =

- Commune
- Coat of arms
- Location of Saussenac
- Location within France Location within Occitanie
- Coordinates: 43°59′15″N 2°16′48″E
- Country: France
- Region: Occitania
- Department: Tarn
- Arrondissement: Albi
- Canton: Carmaux-1 Le Ségala
- Intercommunality: Val 81

Government
  - Mayor (2020–2026): Didier Roudier
- Area^{1}: 17.39 km^{2} (6.71 sq mi)
- Elevation: 400 m (1,300 ft)
- Highest elevation: 498 m (1,634 ft)
- Lowest elevation: 218 m (715 ft)
- Population (2023): 632
  - Density: 36.3/km^{2} (94.1/sq mi)
- Time zone: UTC+01:00 (CET)
  - Summer (DST): UTC+02:00 (CEST)
- INSEE/Postal code: 81277 /81350
- ^{1} French Land Register data, which excludes lakes, ponds, glaciers > 1 km^{2} (0.386 sq mi or 247 acres) and river estuaries.

Saussenac is a commune in the Tarn department in southern France.

== See also ==
- Communes of the Tarn department
