= Rosières, Tarn =

Rosières
- Commune
- Coat of arms
- Location of Rosières
- Location within France Location within Occitanie
- Coordinates: 44°02′42″N 2°11′02″E
- Country: France
- Region: Occitania
- Department: Tarn
- Arrondissement: Albi
- Canton: Carmaux-1 Le Ségala

Government
  - Mayor (2020–2026): Alain Astié
- Area^{1}: 10.55 km^{2} (4.07 sq mi)
- Elevation: 245 m (804 ft)
- Highest elevation: 354 m (1,161 ft)
- Lowest elevation: 235 m (771 ft)
- Population (2023): 716
  - Density: 67.9/km^{2} (176/sq mi)
- Time zone: UTC+01:00 (CET)
  - Summer (DST): UTC+02:00 (CEST)
- INSEE/Postal code: 81230 /81400
- ^{1} French Land Register data, which excludes lakes, ponds, glaciers > 1 km^{2} (0.386 sq mi or 247 acres) and river estuaries.

Rosières (French pronunciation: [ʁozjɛʁ]; Occitan: Rosièras, meaning rose bushes) is a commune in the Tarn department in southern France.

== Geography ==
The commune is traversed by the Cérou river.

== See also ==
- Communes of the Tarn department
