= Tanus, Tarn =

Tanus
- Commune
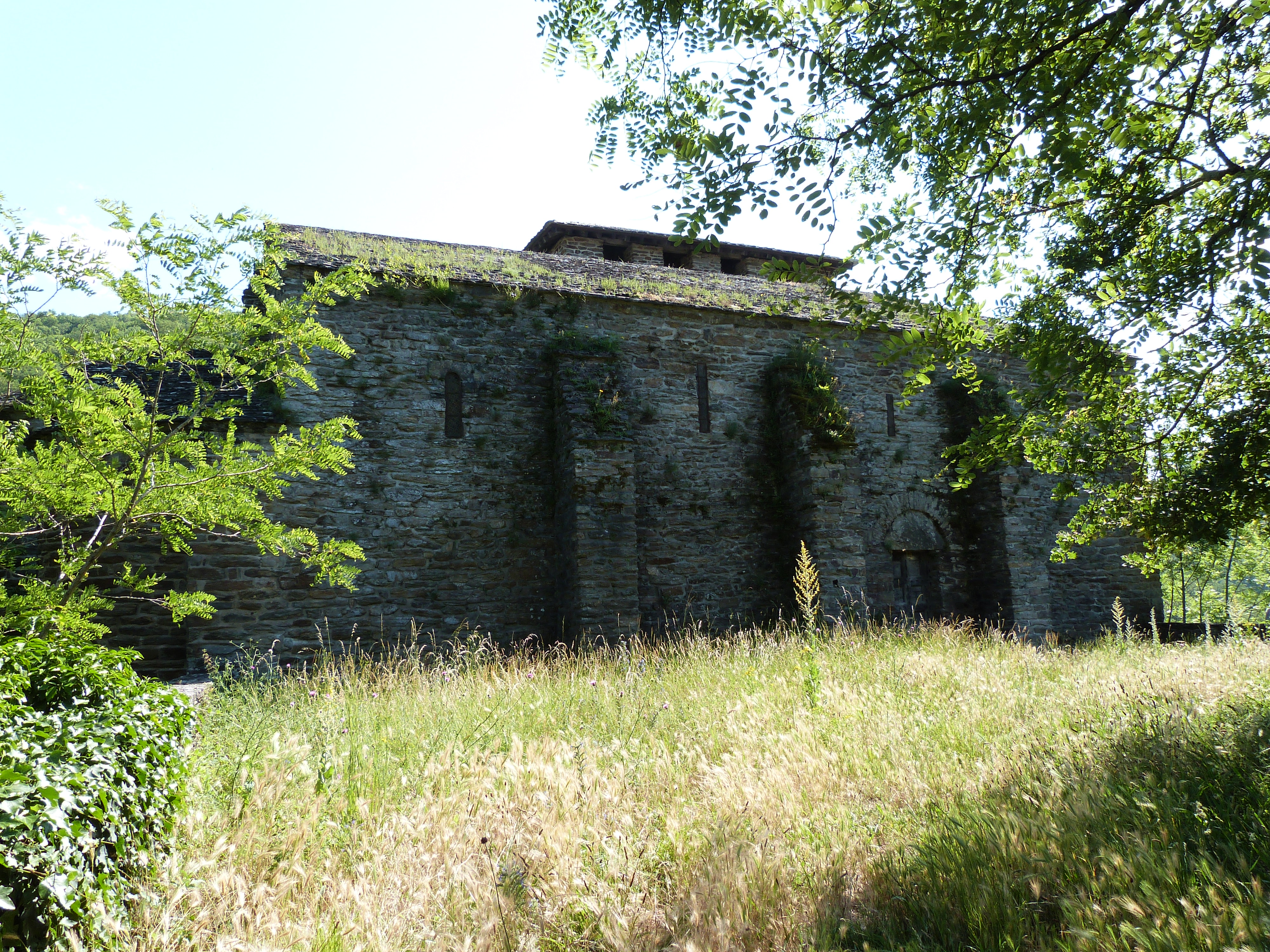
- The church in Tanus
- Location of Tanus
- Location within France Location within Occitanie
- Coordinates: 44°06′11″N 2°19′06″E
- Country: France
- Region: Occitania
- Department: Tarn
- Arrondissement: Albi
- Canton: Carmaux-1 Le Ségala
- Intercommunality: Carmausin-Ségala

Government
  - Mayor (2020–2026): Benoît Ravailhe
- Area^{1}: 19.07 km^{2} (7.36 sq mi)
- Elevation: 440 m (1,440 ft)
- Highest elevation: 568 m (1,864 ft)
- Lowest elevation: 293 m (961 ft)
- Population (2023): 552
  - Density: 28.9/km^{2} (75.0/sq mi)
- Time zone: UTC+01:00 (CET)
  - Summer (DST): UTC+02:00 (CEST)
- INSEE/Postal code: 81292 /81190
- ^{1} French Land Register data, which excludes lakes, ponds, glaciers > 1 km^{2} (0.386 sq mi or 247 acres) and river estuaries.

Tanus (French pronunciation: [tanys]) is a commune in the Tarn department, Occitanie region of southern France.

== See also ==
- Communes of the Tarn department
