= Crespin, Tarn =

Crespin
- Commune
- Location of Crespin
- Location within France Location within Occitanie
- Coordinates: 44°03′09″N 2°17′57″E
- Country: France
- Region: Occitania
- Department: Tarn
- Arrondissement: Albi
- Canton: Carmaux-1 Le Ségala
- Intercommunality: Carmausin-Ségala

Government
  - Mayor (2020–2026): Jean-Paul Valière
- Area^{1}: 14.15 km^{2} (5.46 sq mi)
- Elevation: 525 m (1,722 ft)
- Highest elevation: 595 m (1,952 ft)
- Lowest elevation: 291 m (955 ft)
- Population (2023): 99
  - Density: 7.0/km^{2} (18/sq mi)
- Time zone: UTC+01:00 (CET)
  - Summer (DST): UTC+02:00 (CEST)
- INSEE/Postal code: 81072 /81350
- ^{1} French Land Register data, which excludes lakes, ponds, glaciers > 1 km^{2} (0.386 sq mi or 247 acres) and river estuaries.

Crespin (French pronunciation: [kʁɛspɛ̃]) is a commune in the Tarn department in southern France.

== Geography ==
The commune is traversed by the Cérou river.

== See also ==
- Communes of the Tarn department
