= Jardin des Paradis =

Garden in Tarn, Midi-Pyrénées, France

Coordinates: 44°03′52″N 1°57′13″E

The Jardin des Paradis (3000 m^{2}) is a private garden located on the Place du Théron, Cordes-sur-Ciel, Tarn, Midi-Pyrénées, France. It has been recognized as a Jardin Remarquable since 2004, and is open daily in the warmer months; an admission fee is charged.

The garden was created in 1997 by Eric Ossart and Arnaud Maurières with Brazilian landscape architect Roberto Burle Marx, and opened to the public in 1998. It is designed in an unusual blend of contemporary, oriental, and medieval styles, and organized as three terraces. Notable features include a rectangular pond serving as water garden, and a vegetable garden with chard, leeks, mallow, peppers (30 varieties), pumpkins, and tomatoes (over 60 varieties).

== See also ==
- List of botanical gardens in France
