= Cérou =

River in southern France

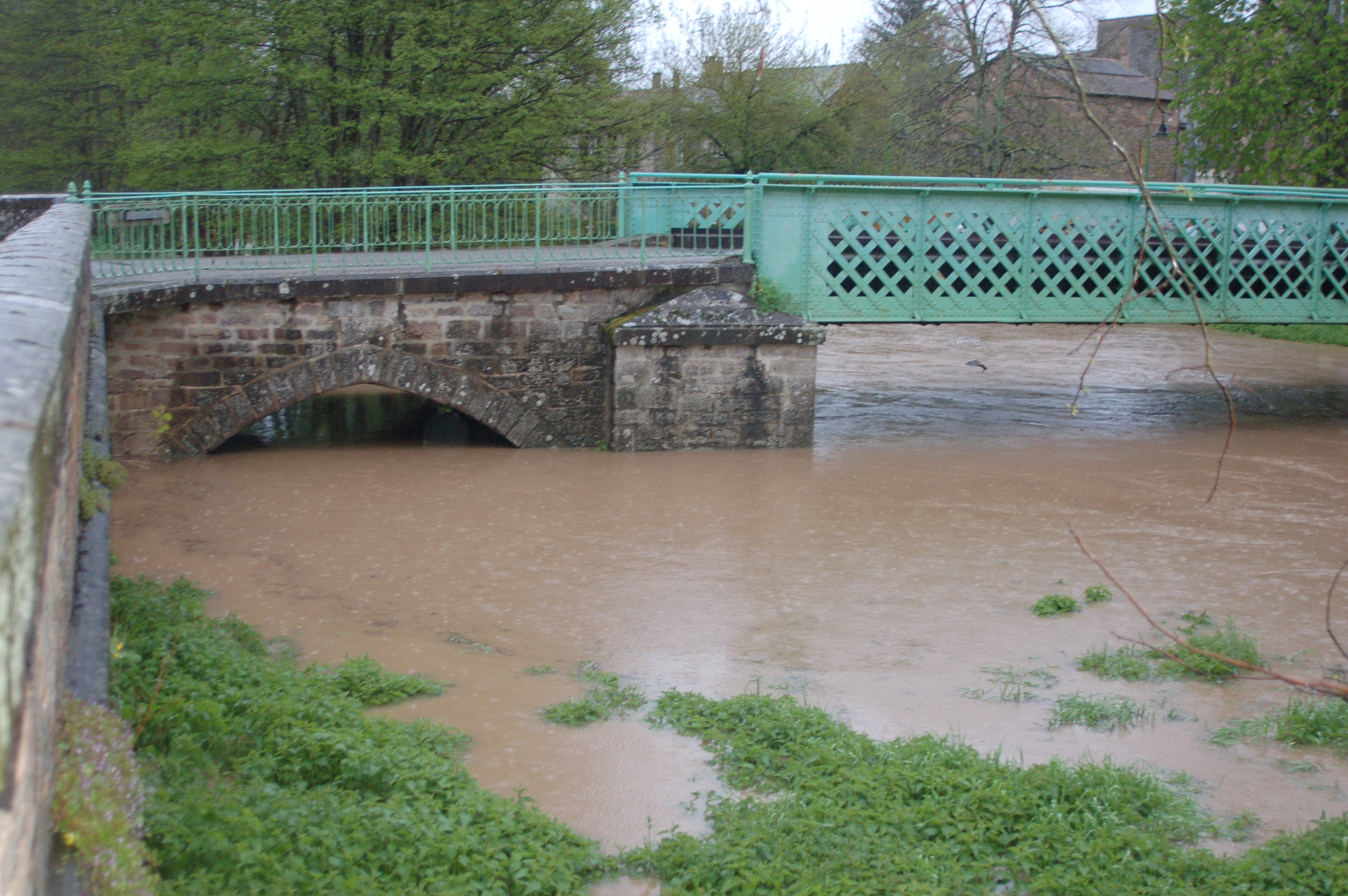
- The Cérou in 2008, during a flood.

- Location within France Location within Occitanie

Location
- Country: France

Physical characteristics
- Source
  - location: near Saint-Jean-Delnous
  - coordinates: 44°03′21″N 02°28′33″E
  - elevation: 530 m (1,740 ft)
- Mouth
  - location: Aveyron
  - coordinates: 44°08′21″N 01°52′32″E
  - elevation: 128 m (420 ft)
- Length: 87.1 km (54.1 mi)
- Basin size: 503 km^{2} (194 sq mi)
- Discharge
  - average: 4.13 m^{3}/s (146 cu ft/s)

Basin features
- Progression: Aveyron→ Tarn→ Garonne→ Gironde estuary→ Atlantic Ocean

The Cérou (French pronunciation: [seʁu]) is an 87.1 km (54.1 mi) long river in the Aveyron and Tarn departments in southern France. Its source is at Saint-Jean-Delnous, 1.8 km (1.1 mi) northwest of the village. It flows generally west-northwest. It is a left tributary of the Aveyron, into which it flows at Milhars, 1.4 km (0.87 mi) north of the village.

== Departments and communes along its course ==
It flows generally west through the following departments and communes, ordered from source to mouth:

- Aveyron: Saint-Jean-Delnous, Lédergues
- Tarn: Lédas-et-Penthiès, Lacapelle-Pinet, Padiès, Crespin, Andouque, Saint-Jean-de-Marcel, Valderiès, Rosières, Carmaux, Saint-Benoît-de-Carmaux, Monestiés, Le Ségur, Salles, Saint-Marcel-Campes, Cordes-sur-Ciel, Les Cabannes, Mouzieys-Panens, Vindrac-Alayrac, Labarthe-Bleys, Marnaves, Milhars

== Tributaries ==
The Farruel (12.5 km), the Boutescure (15.4 km), the Céroc (17.6 km), the Candou, the Céret (28.5 km), the Zère, the Aymer (12,2 km), and the Bonnan.
