= Labarthe-Bleys =

- Commune
- Location of Labarthe-Bleys
- Location within France Location within Occitanie
- Coordinates: 44°04′39″N 1°54′29″E
- Country: France
- Region: Occitania
- Department: Tarn
- Arrondissement: Albi
- Canton: Carmaux-2 Vallée du Cérou

Government
  - Mayor (2020–2026): Daniel Ganthe
- Area^{1}: 9.06 km^{2} (3.50 sq mi)
- Elevation: 158 m (518 ft)
- Highest elevation: 367 m (1,204 ft)
- Lowest elevation: 150 m (490 ft)
- Population (2023): 74
  - Density: 8.2/km^{2} (21/sq mi)
- Time zone: UTC+01:00 (CET)
  - Summer (DST): UTC+02:00 (CEST)
- INSEE/Postal code: 81111 /81170
- ^{1} French Land Register data, which excludes lakes, ponds, glaciers > 1 km^{2} (0.386 sq mi or 247 acres) and river estuaries.

Labarthe-Bleys is a commune in the Tarn department in southern France.

== Geography ==
The commune is traversed by the Cérou river.

== See also ==
- Communes of the Tarn department
