= Saint-Jean-de-Marcel =

- Commune
- Location of Saint-Jean-de-Marcel
- Location within France Location within Occitanie
- Coordinates: 44°03′34″N 2°14′46″E
- Country: France
- Region: Occitania
- Department: Tarn
- Arrondissement: Albi
- Canton: Carmaux-1 Le Ségala
- Intercommunality: Carmausin-Ségala

Government
  - Mayor (2021–2026): Régis Tesson
- Area^{1}: 18.25 km^{2} (7.05 sq mi)
- Elevation: 381 m (1,250 ft)
- Highest elevation: 486 m (1,594 ft)
- Lowest elevation: 250 m (820 ft)
- Population (2023): 385
  - Density: 21.1/km^{2} (54.6/sq mi)
- Time zone: UTC+01:00 (CET)
  - Summer (DST): UTC+02:00 (CEST)
- INSEE/Postal code: 81254 /81350
- ^{1} French Land Register data, which excludes lakes, ponds, glaciers > 1 km^{2} (0.386 sq mi or 247 acres) and river estuaries.

Saint-Jean-de-Marcel (French pronunciation: [sɛ̃ ʒɑ̃ də maʁsɛl]; Languedocien: Sant Joan de Marcelh) is a commune in the Tarn department in southern France.

== Geography ==
The commune is traversed by the Cérou river.

== See also ==
- Communes of the Tarn department
