= Valderiès =

- Commune
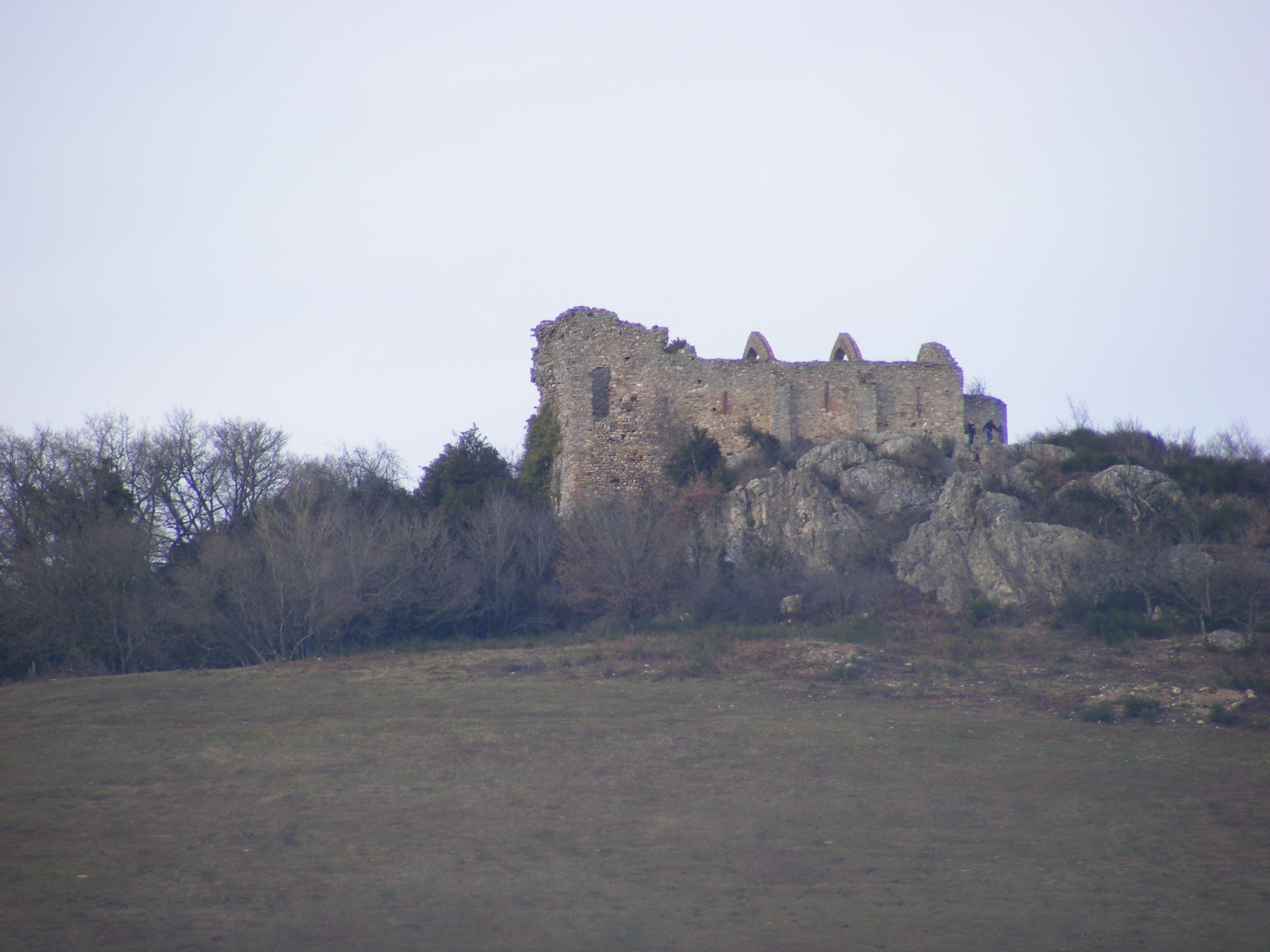
- The former abbey

- Coat of arms
- Location of Valderiès
- Location within France Location within Occitanie
- Coordinates: 44°00′46″N 2°14′00″E
- Country: France
- Region: Occitania
- Department: Tarn
- Arrondissement: Albi
- Canton: Carmaux-1 Le Ségala
- Intercommunality: Carmausin-Ségala

Government
  - Mayor (2020–2026): Vincent Recoules
- Area^{1}: 20.42 km^{2} (7.88 sq mi)
- Highest elevation: 424 m (1,391 ft)
- Lowest elevation: 216 m (709 ft)
- Population (2023): 827
  - Density: 40.5/km^{2} (105/sq mi)
- Time zone: UTC+01:00 (CET)
  - Summer (DST): UTC+02:00 (CEST)
- INSEE/Postal code: 81306 /81350
- ^{1} French Land Register data, which excludes lakes, ponds, glaciers > 1 km^{2} (0.386 sq mi or 247 acres) and river estuaries.

Valderiès (French pronunciation: [valdəʁjɛs]; Occitan: Valdariás) is a commune in the Tarn department in southern France.

== Geography ==
The commune is traversed by the Cérou river.

== See also ==
- Communes of the Tarn department
