= Cordes-sur-Ciel =

Cordes-sur-Ciel Còrdas (Occitan)
- Commune
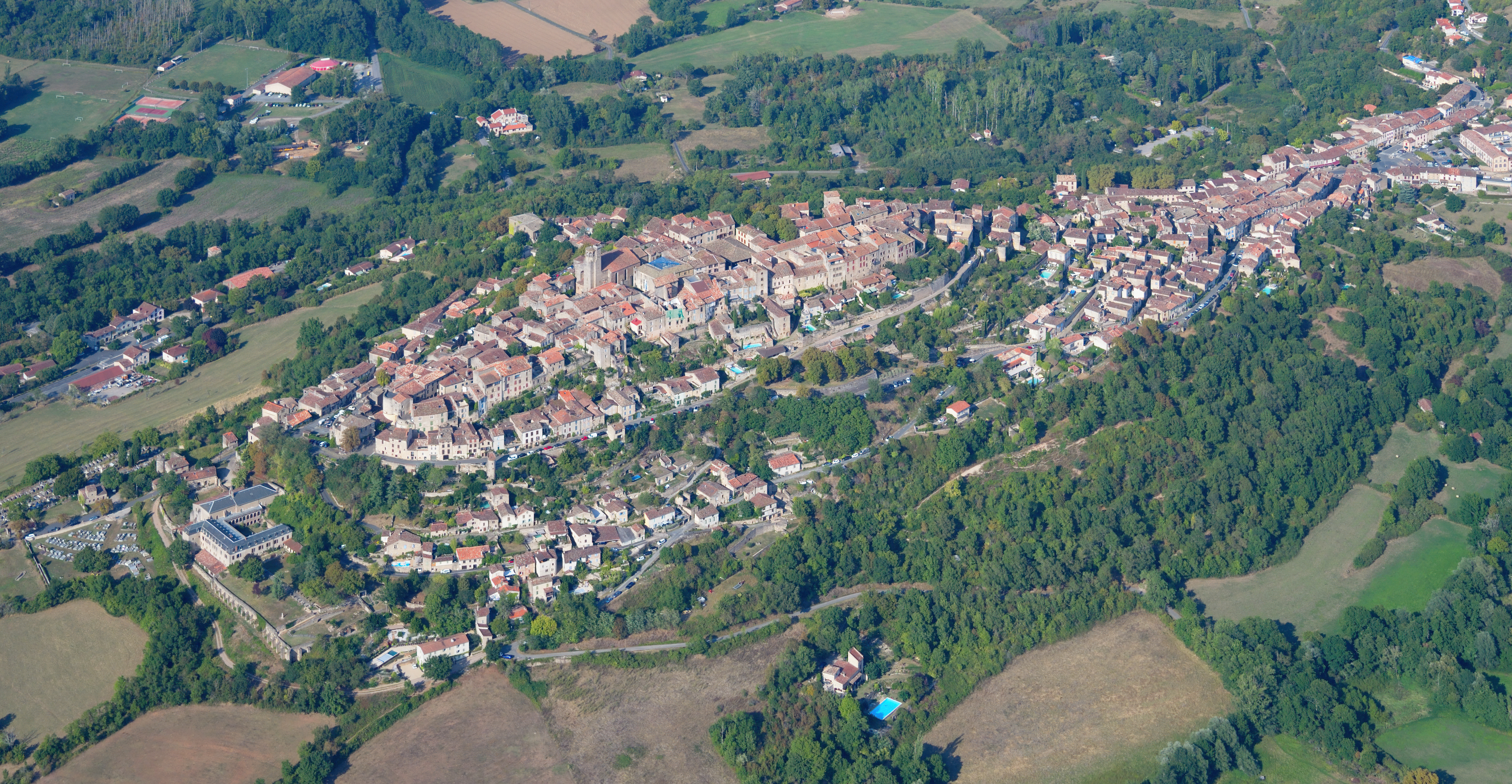
- Aerial view of Cordes-sur-Ciel

- Coat of arms
- Location of Cordes-sur-Ciel
- Location within France Location within Occitanie
- Coordinates: 44°03′52″N 1°57′13″E
- Country: France
- Region: Occitania
- Department: Tarn
- Arrondissement: Albi
- Canton: Carmaux-2 Vallée du Cérou

Government
  - Mayor (2020–2026): Bernard Andrieu
- Area^{1}: 8.27 km^{2} (3.19 sq mi)
- Elevation: 279 m (915 ft)
- Highest elevation: 320 m (1,050 ft)
- Lowest elevation: 159 m (522 ft)
- Population (2023): 879
  - Density: 106/km^{2} (275/sq mi)
- Time zone: UTC+01:00 (CET)
  - Summer (DST): UTC+02:00 (CEST)
- INSEE/Postal code: 81069 /81170
- ^{1} French Land Register data, which excludes lakes, ponds, glaciers > 1 km^{2} (0.386 sq mi or 247 acres) and river estuaries.

Cordes-sur-Ciel (French pronunciation: [kɔʁd syʁ sjɛl]; Occitan: Còrdas, [ˈkɔɾðos], before 1993: Cordes) is a commune in the Tarn department, region of Occitania, Southern France. The fortified town was built in 1222 by Raimond VII, the Count of Toulouse, who, though not a Cathar, tolerated what other Catholics considered heresy.

Since the late 20th century, the village has become a popular tourist destination. It is a member of Les Plus Beaux Villages de France (The Most Beautiful Villages of France) Association. Until 1993, the town's name was Cordes, a word thought to come from the Indo-European root "corte" meaning "rocky heights." That year, it was renamed Cordes-sur-Ciel, to indicate its height above the clouds over low-lying areas of the valley.

== History ==
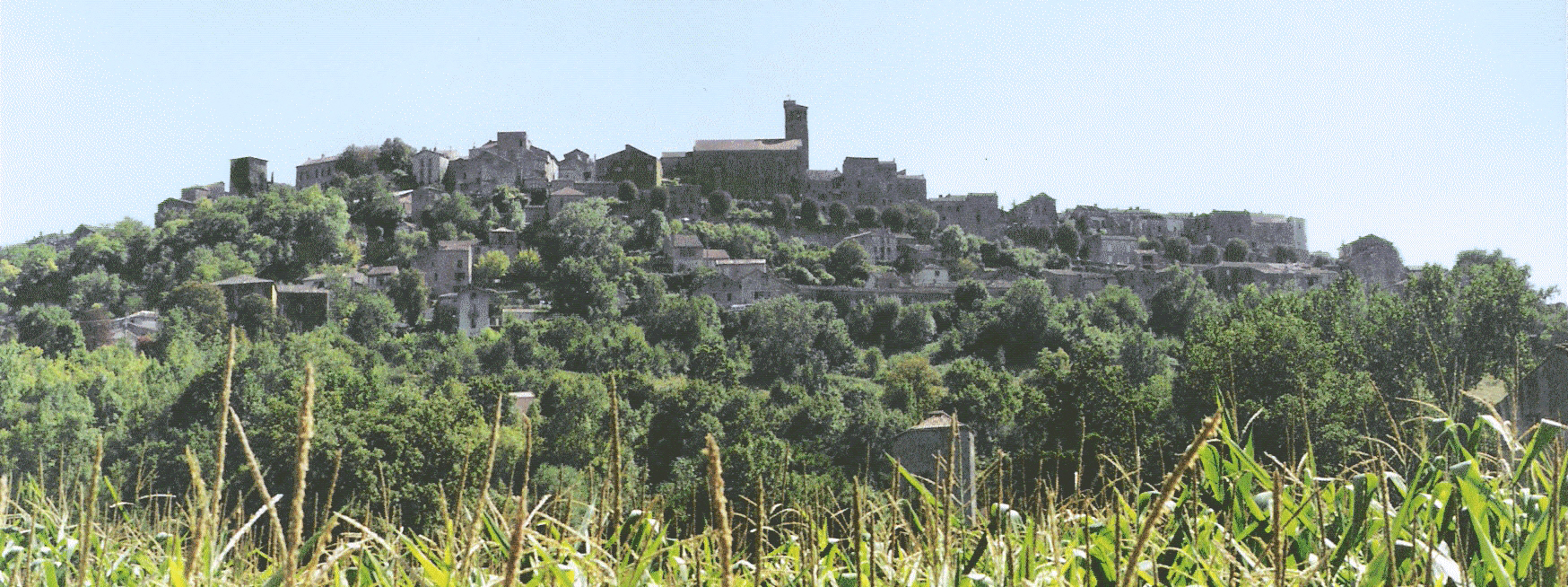
Cordes seen from the valley

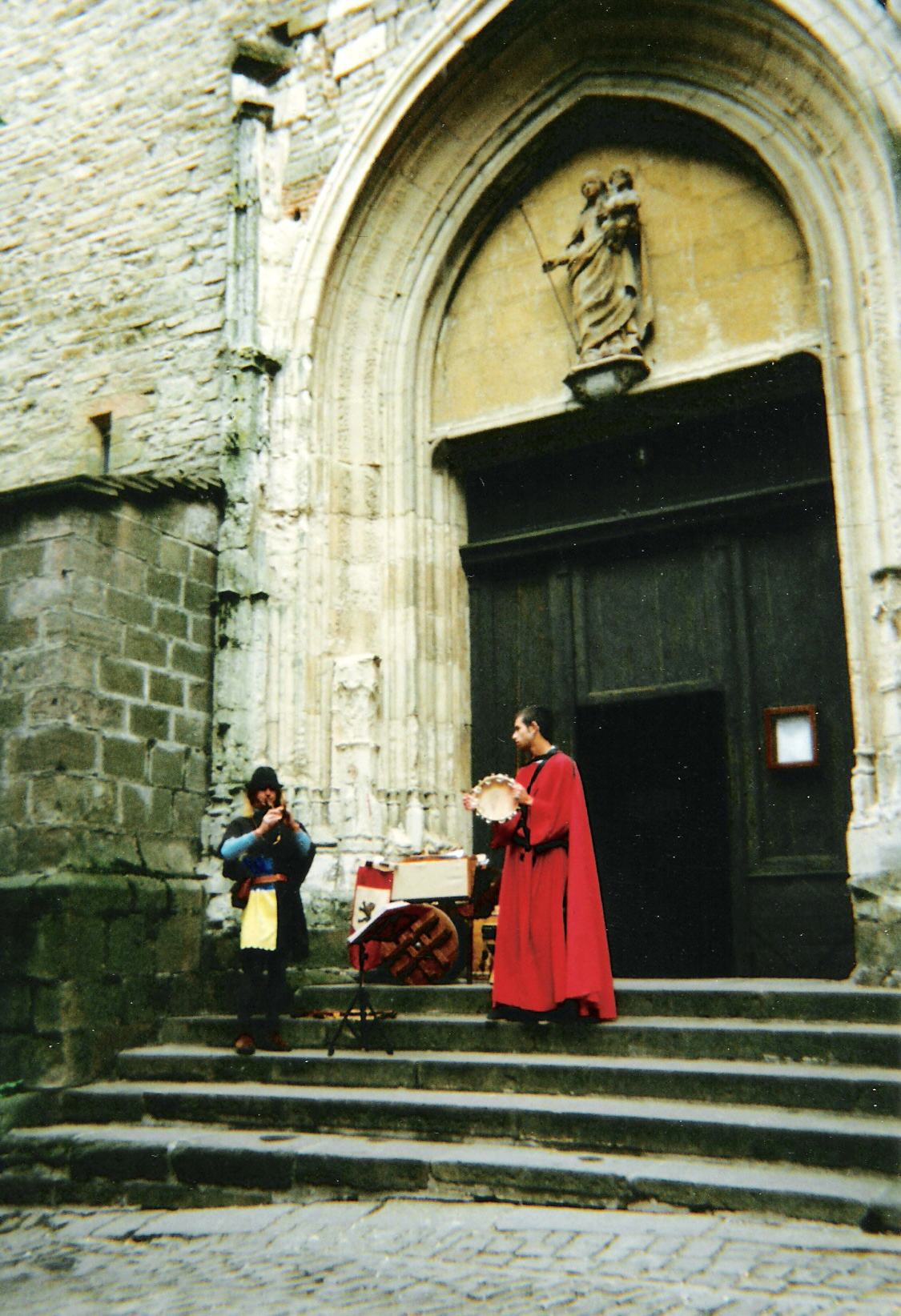
Minstrels playing in front of a church during a festival

In 1222, Cordes received its charter from the Count of Toulouse to become a "bastide". It is generally considered to be the first of the bastides of Southwest France. (Some historians classify Montauban, built in the 12th century, as a bastide.) Bastides were "new towns," originally conceived to resettle and shelter people who had been displaced by the Albigensian Crusade. They were also intended to colonize southwest France and encourage agricultural and related market development. Though not fortified, bastides were often built in defensible locations.

Cordes was built between 1222 and 1229 to protect the scattered population of the area from conflict. It was intended to replace the village of Saint-Marcel, which was burnt down by the troops of Simon de Montfort in 1215, during the Northern baron's crusade against the Albigensians.

By the 1229 Treaty of Paris, Raymond VII of Toulouse conceded defeat to Louis IX of France. Under the terms of the treaty, he was authorized and encouraged to develop the bastides. In 1241, Jeanne, the Countess of Toulouse, married Alphonse, the brother of Louis IX and the Count of Poitiers. As a result, Cordes became a part of France in 1271 without having been militarily conquered.

In 1436 Rodrigo de Villandrando pillaged Cordes as part of the Hundred Years' War. The citizens of Cordes, having built their homes within the original 13th-century ramparts, later escaped heavy damage during the religious wars at the end of the 16th century. As a result, some excellent examples of 13th and 14th-century Gothic architecture have been preserved.

=== Modern history ===
The town has attracted pilgrims and craftspeople. In the 1940s it became popular with artists such as the writer Albert Camus, the painter Yves Brayer, and the poet Jeanne Ramel-Cals. Though the name was just "Cordes" at the time, Ramel-Cals liked to call it "Cordes-sur-Ciel" to reflect the town's site on a hill above the clouds that frequently collect in the river valley. In 1993 the mayor changed the name to honor her. In recent decades, it has become a popular spot for tourists interested in heritage destinations.

== Points of interest ==
- The city is known for its medium-sized outdoor market.
- Cordes is home to the Museum of the Art of Sugar and Chocolate. The museum contains hundreds of pieces of art made completely of sugar. Subjects as diverse as the Middle Ages, mythology, technology and nature are illustrated in the museum's art.
- The Jardin des Paradis is a contemporary garden.

== Geography ==
The village lies high above the left bank of the Cérou, which flows westward through the middle of the commune.

== Notable figures ==
- Paul Quilès : Political leader of the French Socialist Party
- Camille Carrión : Puerto Rican actress (part-time resident)

== See also ==
- Communes of the Tarn department
- Tourism in Tarn
