= Montauriol, Tarn =

Montauriol
- Commune
- Location of Montauriol
- Location within France Location within Occitanie
- Coordinates: 44°05′01″N 2°19′22″E
- Country: France
- Region: Occitania
- Department: Tarn
- Arrondissement: Albi
- Canton: Carmaux-1 Le Ségala
- Intercommunality: Carmausin-Ségala

Government
  - Mayor (2020–2026): Alain Maffre
- Area^{1}: 5.3 km^{2} (2.0 sq mi)
- Elevation: 500 m (1,600 ft)
- Highest elevation: 606 m (1,988 ft)
- Lowest elevation: 418 m (1,371 ft)
- Population (2023): 55
  - Density: 10/km^{2} (27/sq mi)
- Time zone: UTC+01:00 (CET)
  - Summer (DST): UTC+02:00 (CEST)
- INSEE/Postal code: 81172 /81190
- ^{1} French Land Register data, which excludes lakes, ponds, glaciers > 1 km^{2} (0.386 sq mi or 247 acres) and river estuaries.

Montauriol (French pronunciation: [mɔ̃toʁjɔl]; Occitan: Montauriòl) is a commune in the Tarn department in southern France.

== See also ==
- Communes of the Tarn department
