= Les Cabannes, Tarn =

Les Cabannes
- Commune
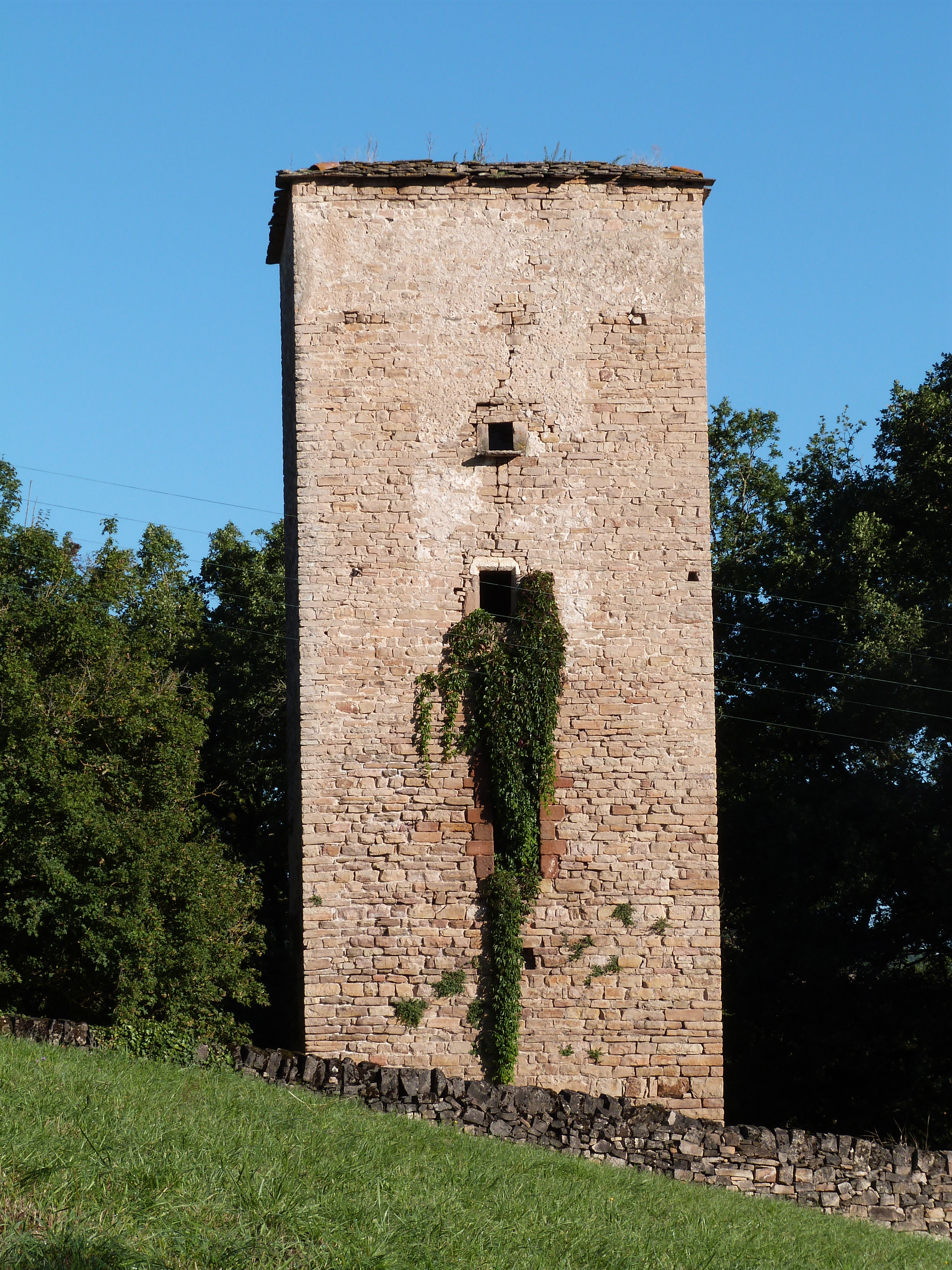
- The tower in Les Cabannes
- Location of Les Cabannes
- Location within France Location within Occitanie
- Coordinates: 44°04′05″N 1°56′29″E
- Country: France
- Region: Occitania
- Department: Tarn
- Arrondissement: Albi
- Canton: Carmaux-2 Vallée du Cérou
- Intercommunality: CC du Cordais et du Causse

Government
  - Mayor (2020–2026): Patrick Lavagne
- Area^{1}: 6.16 km^{2} (2.38 sq mi)
- Elevation: 173 m (568 ft)
- Highest elevation: 310 m (1,020 ft)
- Lowest elevation: 152 m (499 ft)
- Population (2023): 379
  - Density: 61.5/km^{2} (159/sq mi)
- Time zone: UTC+01:00 (CET)
  - Summer (DST): UTC+02:00 (CEST)
- INSEE/Postal code: 81045 /81170
- ^{1} French Land Register data, which excludes lakes, ponds, glaciers > 1 km^{2} (0.386 sq mi or 247 acres) and river estuaries.

Les Cabannes (French pronunciation: [le kaban]; Occitan: Las Cabanas) is a commune in the Tarn department in southern France. It has 367 inhabitants in 2020.

== Geography ==
The Cérou flows westward through the middle of the commune.

== See also ==
- Communes of the Tarn department
