= Lacapelle-Pinet =

- Commune
- Location of Lacapelle-Pinet
- Location within France Location within Occitanie
- Coordinates: 44°04′05″N 2°20′20″E
- Country: France
- Region: Occitania
- Department: Tarn
- Arrondissement: Albi
- Canton: Carmaux-1 Le Ségala
- Intercommunality: Val 81

Government
  - Mayor (2020–2026): David Delmar
- Area^{1}: 8.15 km^{2} (3.15 sq mi)
- Elevation: 590 m (1,940 ft)
- Highest elevation: 602 m (1,975 ft)
- Lowest elevation: 352 m (1,155 ft)
- Population (2023): 67
  - Density: 8.2/km^{2} (21/sq mi)
- Time zone: UTC+01:00 (CET)
  - Summer (DST): UTC+02:00 (CEST)
- INSEE/Postal code: 81122 /81340
- ^{1} French Land Register data, which excludes lakes, ponds, glaciers > 1 km^{2} (0.386 sq mi or 247 acres) and river estuaries.

Lacapelle-Pinet (French pronunciation: [lakapɛl pinɛ]; Occitan: La Capèla Pinet) is a commune in the Tarn department in southern France.

== Geography ==
The commune is traversed by the Cérou river.

== See also ==
- Communes of the Tarn department
