= Almayrac =

- Commune
- Coat of arms
- Location of Almayrac
- Location within France Location within Occitanie
- Coordinates: 44°06′06″N 2°10′03″E
- Country: France
- Region: Occitania
- Department: Tarn
- Arrondissement: Albi
- Canton: Carmaux-1 Le Ségala
- Intercommunality: Carmausin-Ségala

Government
  - Mayor (2020–2026): Jean-Marc Sengès
- Area^{1}: 10.97 km^{2} (4.24 sq mi)
- Elevation: 355 m (1,165 ft)
- Highest elevation: 372 m (1,220 ft)
- Lowest elevation: 248 m (814 ft)
- Population (2023): 293
  - Density: 26.7/km^{2} (69.2/sq mi)
- Time zone: UTC+01:00 (CET)
  - Summer (DST): UTC+02:00 (CEST)
- INSEE/Postal code: 81008 /81190
- ^{1} French Land Register data, which excludes lakes, ponds, glaciers > 1 km^{2} (0.386 sq mi or 247 acres) and river estuaries.

Almayrac (French pronunciation: [almeʁak]; Occitan: Lo Mairac) is a commune of the Tarn department in southern France.

== Population ==
Historical population
Year	Pop.	±% p.a.
1968	275	—
1975	266	−0.47%
1982	269	+0.16%
1990	267	−0.09%
1999	275	+0.33%
2007	283	+0.36%
2012	285	+0.14%
2017	293	+0.56%
2023	293	+0.00%
Source: INSEE

== See also ==
- Communes of the Tarn department
