= Le Dourn =

- Commune
- Coat of arms
- Location of Le Dourn
- Location within France Location within Occitanie
- Coordinates: 44°01′09″N 2°28′34″E
- Country: France
- Region: Occitania
- Department: Tarn
- Arrondissement: Albi
- Canton: Carmaux-1 Le Ségala
- Intercommunality: Val 81

Government
  - Mayor (2020–2026): Eric Albar
- Area^{1}: 9.32 km^{2} (3.60 sq mi)
- Elevation: 500 m (1,600 ft)
- Highest elevation: 583 m (1,913 ft)
- Lowest elevation: 315 m (1,033 ft)
- Population (2023): 116
  - Density: 12.4/km^{2} (32.2/sq mi)
- Time zone: UTC+01:00 (CET)
  - Summer (DST): UTC+02:00 (CEST)
- INSEE/Postal code: 81082 /81340
- ^{1} French Land Register data, which excludes lakes, ponds, glaciers > 1 km^{2} (0.386 sq mi or 247 acres) and river estuaries.

Le Dourn (French pronunciation: [lə duʁn]; Occitan: Lo Dorn) is a commune in the Tarn department in southern France.

== See also ==
- Communes of the Tarn department
