= Marnaves =

- Commune
- Location of Marnaves
- Location within France Location within Occitanie
- Coordinates: 44°05′54″N 1°53′19″E
- Country: France
- Region: Occitania
- Department: Tarn
- Arrondissement: Albi
- Canton: Carmaux-2 Vallée du Cérou
- Intercommunality: CC du Cordais et du Causse

Government
  - Mayor (2023–2026): Benoît Ourliac
- Area^{1}: 10.29 km^{2} (3.97 sq mi)
- Elevation: 152 m (499 ft)
- Highest elevation: 488 m (1,601 ft)
- Lowest elevation: 150 m (490 ft)
- Population (2023): 76
  - Density: 7.4/km^{2} (19/sq mi)
- Time zone: UTC+01:00 (CET)
  - Summer (DST): UTC+02:00 (CEST)
- INSEE/Postal code: 81154 /81170
- ^{1} French Land Register data, which excludes lakes, ponds, glaciers > 1 km^{2} (0.386 sq mi or 247 acres) and river estuaries.

Marnaves (French pronunciation: [maʁnav]; Occitan: Marnavas) is a commune in the Tarn department and Occitanie region of southern France.

== Geography ==
The commune is traversed by the Cérou river.

== See also ==
- Communes of the Tarn department
