= Fraissines =

- Commune
- Coat of arms
- Location of Fraissines
- Location within France Location within Occitanie
- Coordinates: 43°58′19″N 2°30′39″E
- Country: France
- Region: Occitania
- Department: Tarn
- Arrondissement: Albi
- Canton: Carmaux-1 Le Ségala
- Intercommunality: Val 81

Government
  - Mayor (2020–2026): Gilbert Assié
- Area^{1}: 6.34 km^{2} (2.45 sq mi)
- Elevation: 551 m (1,808 ft)
- Highest elevation: 552 m (1,811 ft)
- Lowest elevation: 205 m (673 ft)
- Population (2023): 90
  - Density: 14/km^{2} (37/sq mi)
- Time zone: UTC+01:00 (CET)
  - Summer (DST): UTC+02:00 (CEST)
- INSEE/Postal code: 81094 /81340
- ^{1} French Land Register data, which excludes lakes, ponds, glaciers > 1 km^{2} (0.386 sq mi or 247 acres) and river estuaries.

Fraissines (French pronunciation: [fʁɛsin]; Occitan: Fraissinhas) is a commune in the Tarn department in southern France.

== See also ==
- Communes of the Tarn department
