= Saint-Grégoire, Tarn =

Saint-Grégoire
- Commune
- Coat of arms
- Location of Saint-Grégoire
- Location within France Location within Occitanie
- Coordinates: 43°57′45″N 2°15′44″E
- Country: France
- Region: Occitania
- Department: Tarn
- Arrondissement: Albi
- Canton: Carmaux-1 Le Ségala
- Intercommunality: Val 81

Government
  - Mayor (2023–2026): Charles Riva
- Area^{1}: 12.75 km^{2} (4.92 sq mi)
- Elevation: 330 m (1,080 ft)
- Highest elevation: 368 m (1,207 ft)
- Lowest elevation: 160 m (520 ft)
- Population (2023): 478
  - Density: 37.5/km^{2} (97.1/sq mi)
- Time zone: UTC+01:00 (CET)
  - Summer (DST): UTC+02:00 (CEST)
- INSEE/Postal code: 81253 /81350
- ^{1} French Land Register data, which excludes lakes, ponds, glaciers > 1 km^{2} (0.386 sq mi or 247 acres) and river estuaries.

Saint-Grégoire (French pronunciation: [sɛ̃ ɡʁeɡwaʁ]; Languedocien: Sent Gorgòri) is a commune in the Tarn department in southern France.

== See also ==
- Communes of the Tarn department
