= Saint-Cirgue =

- Commune
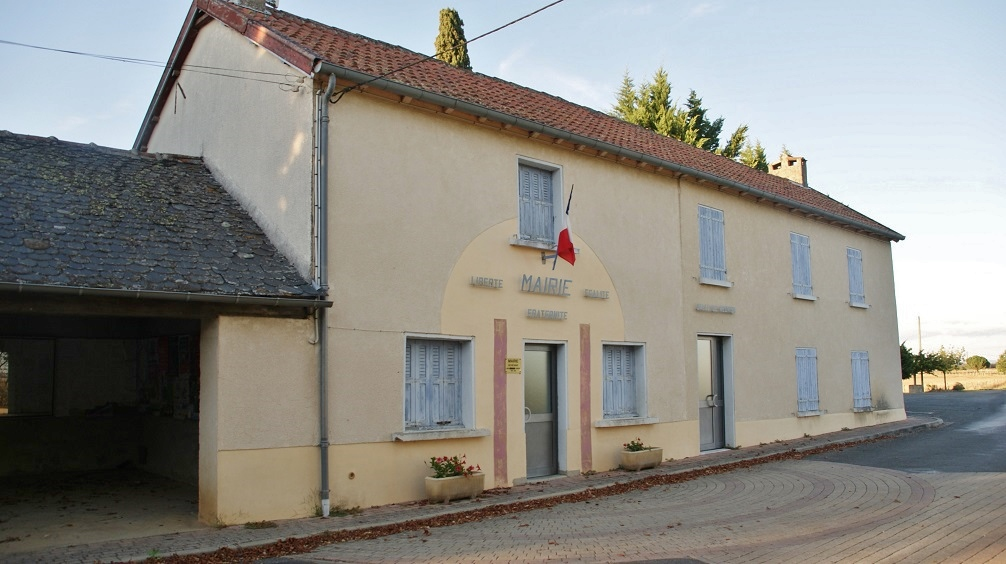
- Town hall

- Coat of arms
- Location of Saint-Cirgue
- Location within France Location within Occitanie
- Coordinates: 43°57′58″N 2°22′18″E
- Country: France
- Region: Occitania
- Department: Tarn
- Arrondissement: Albi
- Canton: Carmaux-1 Le Ségala
- Intercommunality: Val 81

Government
  - Mayor (2020–2026): Geneviève Thomas
- Area^{1}: 18.7 km^{2} (7.2 sq mi)
- Elevation: 422 m (1,385 ft)
- Highest elevation: 457 m (1,499 ft)
- Lowest elevation: 180 m (590 ft)
- Population (2023): 224
  - Density: 12.0/km^{2} (31.0/sq mi)
- Time zone: UTC+01:00 (CET)
  - Summer (DST): UTC+02:00 (CEST)
- INSEE/Postal code: 81247 /81340
- ^{1} French Land Register data, which excludes lakes, ponds, glaciers > 1 km^{2} (0.386 sq mi or 247 acres) and river estuaries.

Saint-Cirgue (French pronunciation: [sɛ̃ siʁɡ]; Occitan: Sent Cirgue) is a commune in the Tarn department in southern France.

== See also ==
- Communes of the Tarn department
