= Saint-Jean-Delnous =

Commune in Occitanie, France

- Commune
- Location of Saint-Jean-Delnous
- Location within France Location within Occitanie
- Coordinates: 44°02′42″N 2°29′36″E
- Country: France
- Region: Occitania
- Department: Aveyron
- Arrondissement: Millau
- Canton: Monts du Réquistanais
- Intercommunality: Réquistanais

Government
  - Mayor (2020–2026): Gilbert Dalmayrac
- Area^{1}: 18.29 km^{2} (7.06 sq mi)
- Elevation: 515 m (1,690 ft)
- Highest elevation: 599 m (1,965 ft)
- Lowest elevation: 350 m (1,150 ft)
- Population (2023): 391
  - Density: 21.4/km^{2} (55.4/sq mi)
- Time zone: UTC+01:00 (CET)
  - Summer (DST): UTC+02:00 (CEST)
- INSEE/Postal code: 12230 /12170
- ^{1} French Land Register data, which excludes lakes, ponds, glaciers > 1 km^{2} (0.386 sq mi or 247 acres) and river estuaries.

Saint-Jean-Delnous (Languedocien: Sant Joan del Nos) is a commune in the Aveyron department in southern France.

== Geography ==
The river Cérou has its source in the commune.

== Population ==
Historical population
Year	Pop.	±% p.a.
1968	491	—
1975	429	−1.91%
1982	372	−2.02%
1990	377	+0.17%
1999	390	+0.38%
2007	454	+1.92%
2012	433	−0.94%
2017	418	−0.70%
2023	391	−1.11%
Source: INSEE

== See also ==
- Communes of the Aveyron department
