= Faussergues =

- Commune
- Coat of arms
- Location of Faussergues
- Location within France Location within Occitanie
- Coordinates: 44°02′20″N 2°26′29″E
- Country: France
- Region: Occitania
- Department: Tarn
- Arrondissement: Albi
- Canton: Carmaux-1 Le Ségala
- Intercommunality: Val 81

Government
  - Mayor (2020–2026): Jean-Jacques Almayrac
- Area^{1}: 14.84 km^{2} (5.73 sq mi)
- Elevation: 532 m (1,745 ft)
- Highest elevation: 583 m (1,913 ft)
- Lowest elevation: 400 m (1,300 ft)
- Population (2023): 143
  - Density: 9.64/km^{2} (25.0/sq mi)
- Time zone: UTC+01:00 (CET)
  - Summer (DST): UTC+02:00 (CEST)
- INSEE/Postal code: 81089 /81340
- ^{1} French Land Register data, which excludes lakes, ponds, glaciers > 1 km^{2} (0.386 sq mi or 247 acres) and river estuaries.

Faussergues (French pronunciation: [fosɛʁɡ]; Occitan: Faussèrgas) is a commune in the Tarn department in southern France.

== See also ==
- Communes of the Tarn department
