= Le Ségur =

- Commune
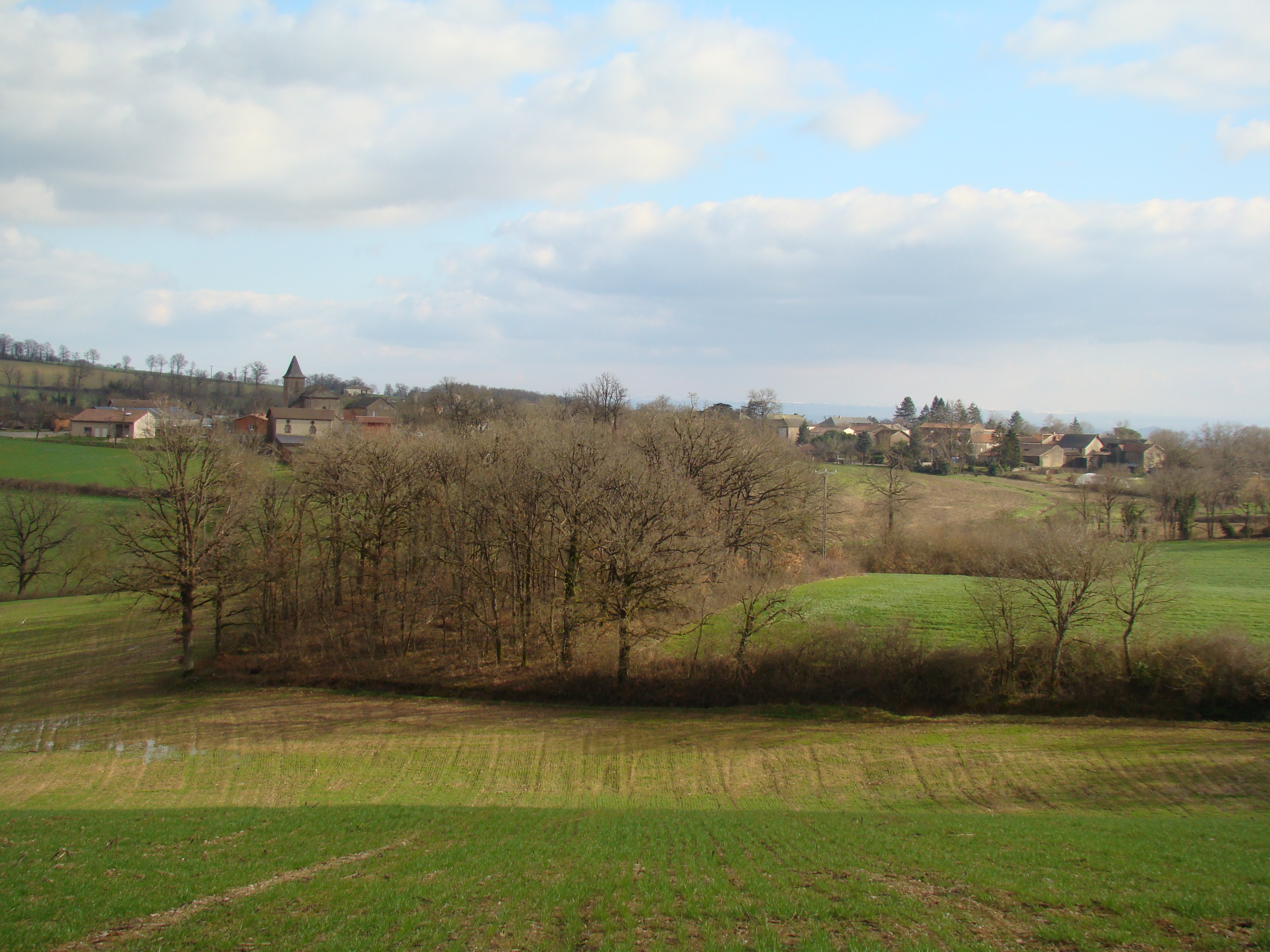
- A general view of Le Ségur
- Location of Le Ségur
- Location within France Location within Occitanie
- Coordinates: 44°06′33″N 2°03′33″E
- Country: France
- Region: Occitania
- Department: Tarn
- Arrondissement: Albi
- Canton: Carmaux-2 Vallée du Cérou
- Intercommunality: Carmausin-Ségala

Government
  - Mayor (2020–2026): Christian Hamon
- Area^{1}: 18.91 km^{2} (7.30 sq mi)
- Elevation: 368 m (1,207 ft)
- Highest elevation: 512 m (1,680 ft)
- Lowest elevation: 190 m (620 ft)
- Population (2023): 259
  - Density: 13.7/km^{2} (35.5/sq mi)
- Time zone: UTC+01:00 (CET)
  - Summer (DST): UTC+02:00 (CEST)
- INSEE/Postal code: 81280 /81640
- ^{1} French Land Register data, which excludes lakes, ponds, glaciers > 1 km^{2} (0.386 sq mi or 247 acres) and river estuaries.

Le Ségur (French pronunciation: [lə seɡyʁ]; Occitan: Lo Segur) is a commune in the Tarn department and Occitanie region of southern France.

== Geography ==
The river Cérou forms part of the commune's south-eastern border.

== See also ==
- Communes of the Tarn department
