= Cadix, Tarn =

Cadix
- Commune
- Location of Cadix
- Location within France Location within Occitanie
- Coordinates: 43°58′37″N 2°28′41″E
- Country: France
- Region: Occitania
- Department: Tarn
- Arrondissement: Albi
- Canton: Carmaux-1 Le Ségala
- Intercommunality: Val 81

Government
  - Mayor (2020–2026): Guy Gavalda
- Area^{1}: 18.13 km^{2} (7.00 sq mi)
- Elevation: 495 m (1,624 ft)
- Highest elevation: 525 m (1,722 ft)
- Lowest elevation: 207 m (679 ft)
- Population (2023): 220
  - Density: 12/km^{2} (31/sq mi)
- Time zone: UTC+01:00 (CET)
  - Summer (DST): UTC+02:00 (CEST)
- INSEE/Postal code: 81047 /81340
- ^{1} French Land Register data, which excludes lakes, ponds, glaciers > 1 km^{2} (0.386 sq mi or 247 acres) and river estuaries.

Cadix is a commune in the Tarn department in southern France.

Exposed to an oceanic climate, it is drained by the Tarn river and various other small rivers.

== See also ==
- Communes of the Tarn department
