= Saint-Michel-Labadié =

- Commune
- Coat of arms
- Location of Saint-Michel-Labadié
- Location within France Location within Occitanie
- Coordinates: 44°00′19″N 2°26′12″E
- Country: France
- Region: Occitania
- Department: Tarn
- Arrondissement: Albi
- Canton: Carmaux-1 Le Ségala
- Intercommunality: Val 81

Government
  - Mayor (2020–2026): Fabienne Chazottes
- Area^{1}: 9.78 km^{2} (3.78 sq mi)
- Elevation: 485 m (1,591 ft)
- Highest elevation: 573 m (1,880 ft)
- Lowest elevation: 262 m (860 ft)
- Population (2023): 84
  - Density: 8.6/km^{2} (22/sq mi)
- Time zone: UTC+01:00 (CET)
  - Summer (DST): UTC+02:00 (CEST)
- INSEE/Postal code: 81264 /81340
- ^{1} French Land Register data, which excludes lakes, ponds, glaciers > 1 km^{2} (0.386 sq mi or 247 acres) and river estuaries.

Saint-Michel-Labadié (French pronunciation: [sɛ̃ miʃɛl labadje]; Occitan: Sent Miquèl de l'Abadiá) is a commune in the Tarn department in southern France.

== See also ==
- Communes of the Tarn department
