= Ernest Nègre =

French toponymist

Ernest Angély Séraphin Nègre (French pronunciation: [ɛʁnɛst ɑ̃ʒeli seʁafɛ̃ nɛɡʁ], 11 October 1907 – 15 April 2000) was a French toponymist. He was born in Saint-Julien-Gaulène (Tarn) and died in Toulouse.

== Selected works ==
- Nègre, Ernest (1998). Toponymie générale de la France [General toponymy of France] (in French). Librairie Droz. ISBN 978-2-600-02884-4.
