= Pampelonne =

- Commune
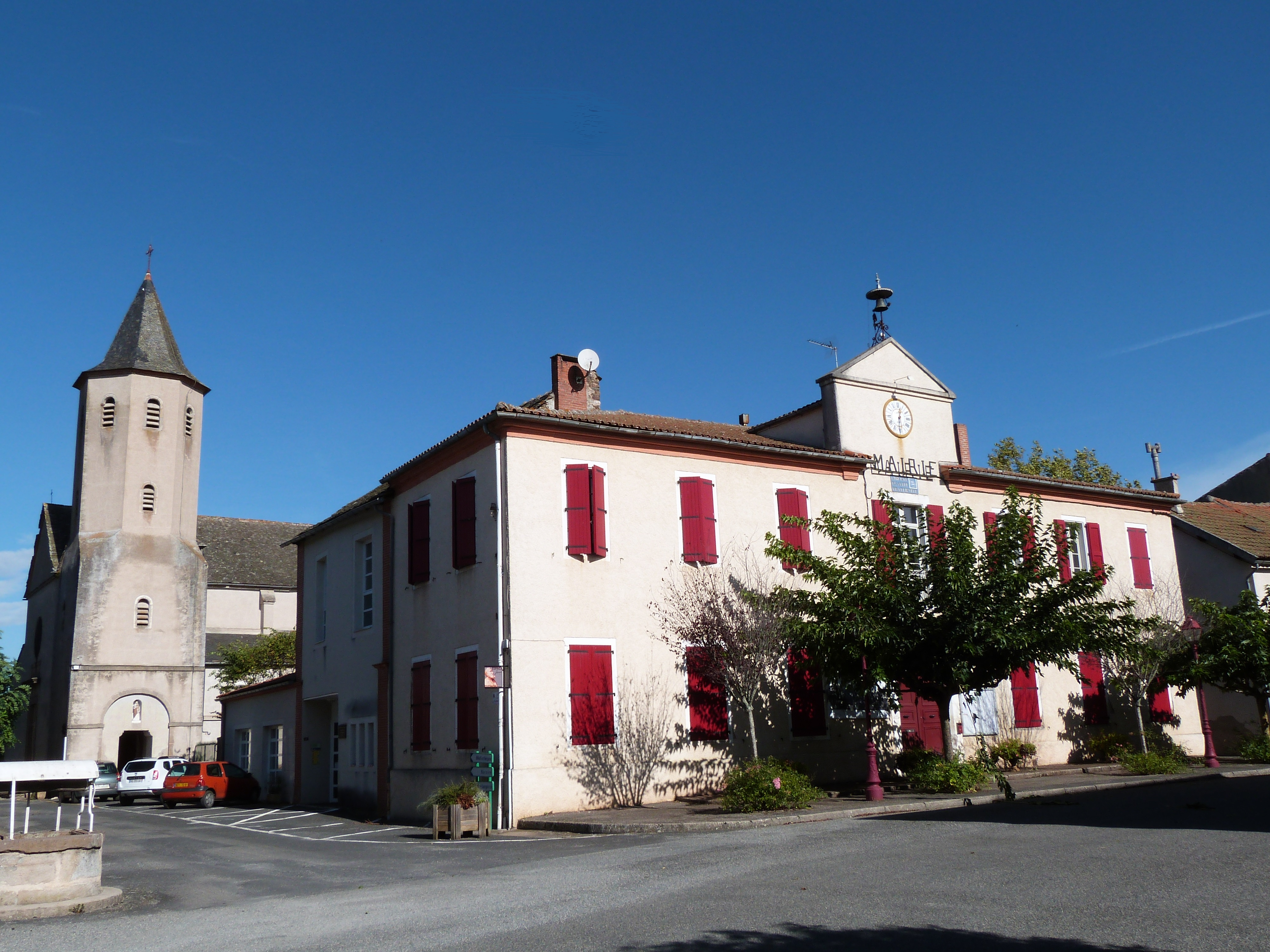
- Pampelonne Town hall

- Coat of arms
- Location of Pampelonne
- Location within France Location within Occitanie
- Coordinates: 44°07′30″N 2°14′50″E
- Country: France
- Region: Occitania
- Department: Tarn
- Arrondissement: Albi
- Canton: Carmaux-1 Le Ségala
- Intercommunality: Carmausin-Ségala

Government
  - Mayor (2020–2026): Guy Malaterre
- Area^{1}: 36.4 km^{2} (14.1 sq mi)
- Elevation: 422 m (1,385 ft)
- Highest elevation: 561 m (1,841 ft)
- Lowest elevation: 250 m (820 ft)
- Population (2023): 963
  - Density: 26.5/km^{2} (68.5/sq mi)
- Time zone: UTC+01:00 (CET)
  - Summer (DST): UTC+02:00 (CEST)
- INSEE/Postal code: 81201 /81190
- ^{1} French Land Register data, which excludes lakes, ponds, glaciers > 1 km^{2} (0.386 sq mi or 247 acres) and river estuaries.

Pampelonne (French pronunciation: [pɑ̃plɔn]; Occitan: Pampalona) is a commune in the Tarn department in southern France.

== See also ==
- Communes of the Tarn department
