= Saint-Marcel-Campes =

- Commune
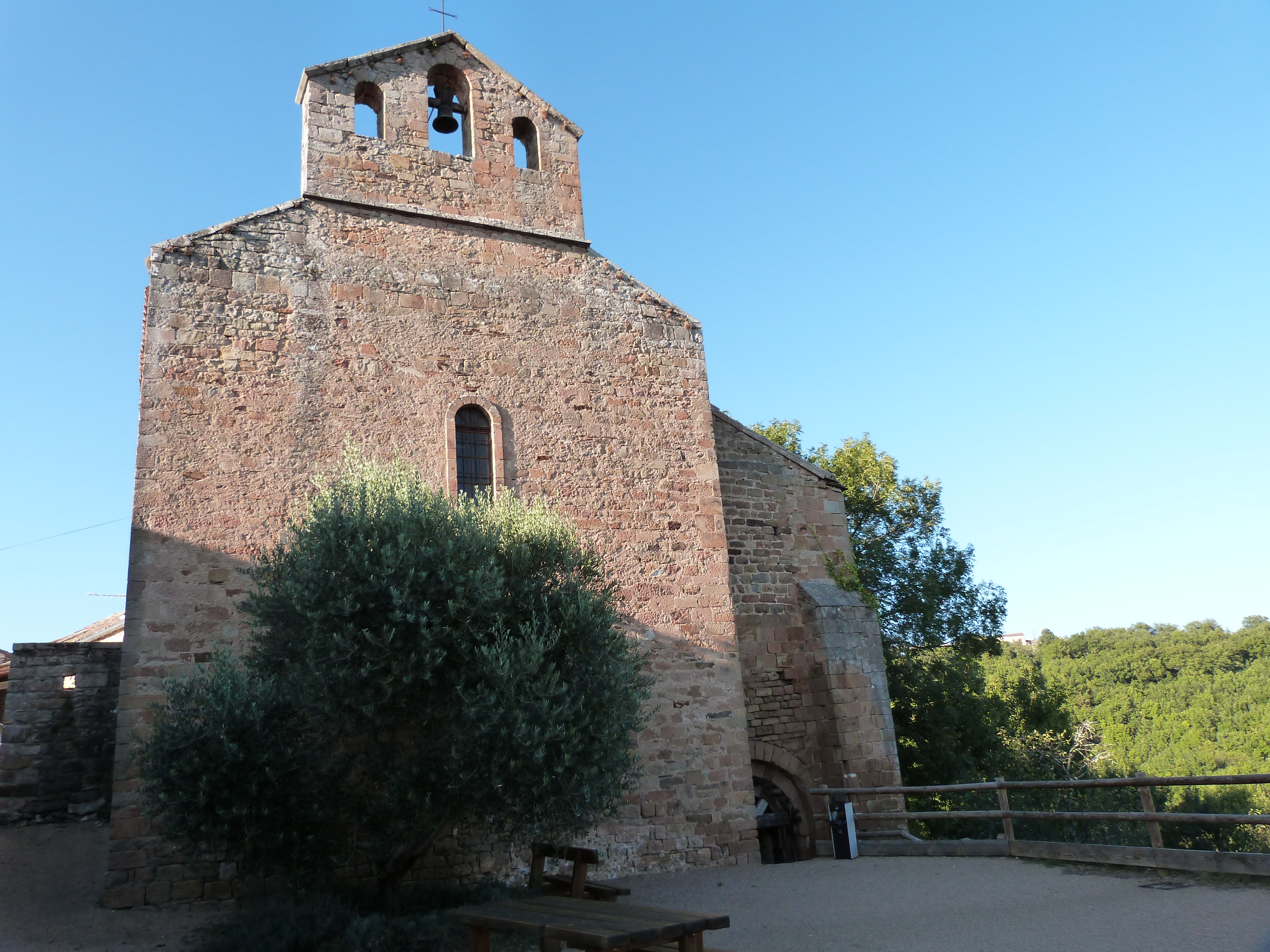
- The church of Saint-Michel, in Saint-Marcel-Campes
- Location of Saint-Marcel-Campes
- Location within France Location within Occitanie
- Coordinates: 44°04′52″N 1°59′25″E
- Country: France
- Region: Occitania
- Department: Tarn
- Arrondissement: Albi
- Canton: Carmaux-2 Vallée du Cérou
- Intercommunality: CC du Cordais et du Causse

Government
  - Mayor (2020–2026): Alex Brière
- Area^{1}: 22.34 km^{2} (8.63 sq mi)
- Elevation: 400 m (1,300 ft)
- Highest elevation: 448 m (1,470 ft)
- Lowest elevation: 158 m (518 ft)
- Population (2023): 239
  - Density: 10.7/km^{2} (27.7/sq mi)
- Time zone: UTC+01:00 (CET)
  - Summer (DST): UTC+02:00 (CEST)
- INSEE/Postal code: 81262 /81170
- ^{1} French Land Register data, which excludes lakes, ponds, glaciers > 1 km^{2} (0.386 sq mi or 247 acres) and river estuaries.

Saint-Marcel-Campes (French pronunciation: [sɛ̃ maʁsɛl kɑ̃p]; Occitan: Sent Marcèl e Campas) is a commune in the Tarn department in southern France.

== Geography ==
The commune is traversed by the Cérou river.

== See also ==
- Communes of the Tarn department
