= Lempaut =

- Commune
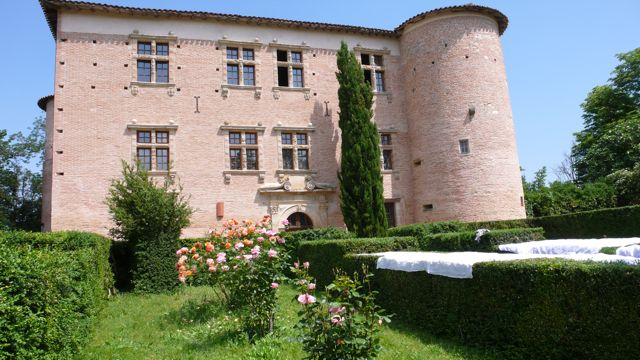
- The Château de Padiès, in Lempaut

- Coat of arms
- Location of Lempaut
- Location within France Location within Occitanie
- Coordinates: 43°31′44″N 2°03′56″E
- Country: France
- Region: Occitania
- Department: Tarn
- Arrondissement: Castres
- Canton: Le Pastel
- Intercommunality: CC aux sources du Canal du Midi

Government
  - Mayor (2020–2026): Jean-Éric Myrthe
- Area^{1}: 14.18 km^{2} (5.47 sq mi)
- Elevation: 179 m (587 ft)
- Highest elevation: 245 m (804 ft)
- Lowest elevation: 170 m (560 ft)
- Population (2023): 878
  - Density: 61.9/km^{2} (160/sq mi)
- Time zone: UTC+01:00 (CET)
  - Summer (DST): UTC+02:00 (CEST)
- INSEE/Postal code: 81142 /81700
- ^{1} French Land Register data, which excludes lakes, ponds, glaciers > 1 km^{2} (0.386 sq mi or 247 acres) and river estuaries.

Lempaut is a commune in the Tarn department in southern France.

In Lempaut is the 17th century Château de Padiès, a listed monument since 1928.

== See also ==
- Communes of the Tarn department
