= André Billoux =

French politician

- Born: June 26, 1928; Sérénac, Tarn, France
- Died: October 9, 1980 (aged 52)
- Occupation: Politician
- Political party: Socialist Party

André Billoux (1928–1980) was a French politician. He served as a member of the National Assembly from 1973 to 1980, representing Tarn.
