= Château de Padiès =

Mansion built on the site of a former castle in France

Coordinates: 43°32′8″N 2°2′43″E

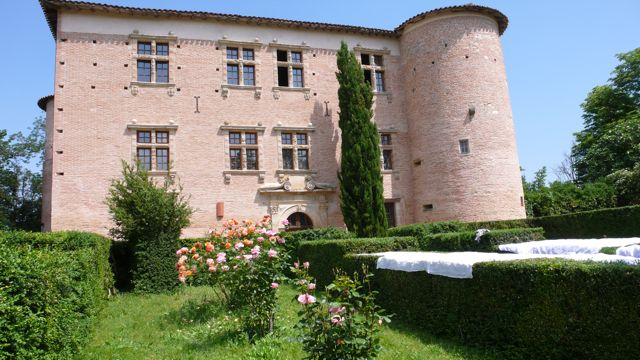
Padiès, south façade

The Château de Padiès is a mansion built on the site of a former castle, located in the outskirts of the village of Lempaut in the département of Tarn in southern France.

The Château de Padiès is a Renaissance château, built in its present form in the 17th century. It is set in the Lauragais region, known for the production of the dye woad (French: pastel). Its “renaissance” façades have finely carved mullioned windows populated with fantastic mythical beings, lions' heads and symbols of plenty.

It has been established that the château existed at least before 1209. The Seigneurs were Cathar sympathisers and records from the Inquisition through to the 13th century are testimony to this. During the Wars of Religion, the château was attacked and pillaged by the Protestants in 1572; the then seigneur blew himself up with the aid of a barrel of gunpowder, his wife and children were taken to nearby Puylaurens where they became Protestant. The son rebuilt Padiès in its present form. Around a hundred years later with the revocation of the Edict of Nantes, the family reaffirmed their Catholic origins. Later, the young Emmanuel de Las Cases stayed at Padiès; he recorded his fond memories of the generous lady of the house, Marie-Claire Villèle (aunt of Jean-Baptiste de Villèle, a future minister of Louis XVIII), and the gardens populated with boxwood animal heads, espaliered grenadiers, the birds, the fireplace one could sit in…. Las Cases went on to become a general under Napoleon, and to write the Mémorial de Ste Hélène.

The last of the Padiès were imprisoned in their château during the French Revolution. They were eventually pardoned because of their “grand old age”. They had no children. In 1800, Pierre de Padiès died leaving his property to his widow, Marie-Claire. She left the château to her family who in turn sold it to the Fabre family in 1826. Padiès remained in the Fabre family until 1992, the date of its acquisition by Denis Piel and Elaine Merkus, the new restorers.

Padiès appears to be a Toulousain hotel particulier transported to the countryside, yet the mass of the building and the diagonally placed towers recall the military role of the château.

As one of the three Seigneuries of Lempaut, Padiès was an integral part of village life. At the time of the Napoleonic census, forty five people lived in the immediate vicinity of the château. They built their shelters using local materials, they farmed, gardened, produced food and clothes, baked bread, killed and processed pigs and generally lived…..and loved….. in a sustainable environment.

In 1998 they received the Special 40th Anniversary VMF Marquis de Amodio Prize for the extensive work completed on the building at that time.

The owners of the Château de Padiès are building an environment to reconnect Padiès with its surroundings in a sustainable way.

Padiès was listed on the Inventaire Supplémentaire des Monuments Historiques (ISMH) in 1928.

== See also ==
- List of castles in France
