= Trébas =

- Commune
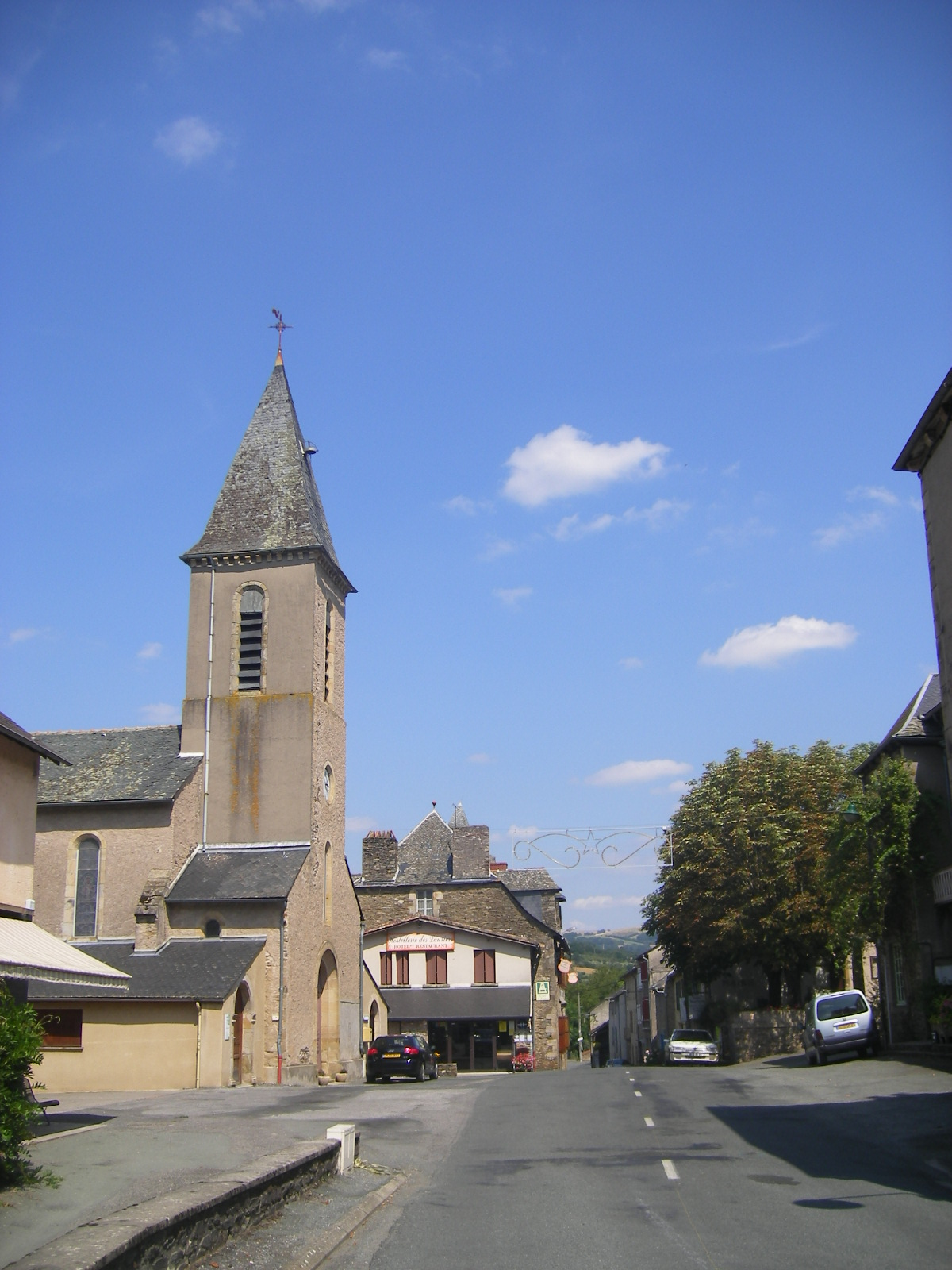
- The church in Trébas

- Coat of arms
- Location of Trébas
- Location within France Location within Occitanie
- Coordinates: 43°56′40″N 2°29′00″E
- Country: France
- Region: Occitania
- Department: Tarn
- Arrondissement: Albi
- Canton: Carmaux-1 Le Ségala
- Intercommunality: Val 81

Government
  - Mayor (2020–2026): Christine Farssac
- Area^{1}: 5.67 km^{2} (2.19 sq mi)
- Elevation: 216 m (709 ft)
- Highest elevation: 523 m (1,716 ft)
- Lowest elevation: 206 m (676 ft)
- Population (2023): 401
  - Density: 70.7/km^{2} (183/sq mi)
- Time zone: UTC+01:00 (CET)
  - Summer (DST): UTC+02:00 (CEST)
- INSEE/Postal code: 81303 /81340
- ^{1} French Land Register data, which excludes lakes, ponds, glaciers > 1 km^{2} (0.386 sq mi or 247 acres) and river estuaries.

Trébas is a commune in the Tarn department and Occitanie region of southern France.

== See also ==
- Communes of the Tarn department
