= Sérénac =

- Commune
- Coat of arms
- Location of Sérénac
- Location within France Location within Occitanie
- Coordinates: 43°57′53″N 2°20′07″E
- Country: France
- Region: Occitania
- Department: Tarn
- Arrondissement: Albi
- Canton: Carmaux-1 Le Ségala
- Intercommunality: Val 81

Government
  - Mayor (2020–2026): Hervé Tarroux
- Area^{1}: 17.02 km^{2} (6.57 sq mi)
- Elevation: 380 m (1,250 ft)
- Highest elevation: 407 m (1,335 ft)
- Lowest elevation: 174 m (571 ft)
- Population (2023): 504
  - Density: 29.6/km^{2} (76.7/sq mi)
- Time zone: UTC+01:00 (CET)
  - Summer (DST): UTC+02:00 (CEST)
- INSEE/Postal code: 81285 /81350
- ^{1} French Land Register data, which excludes lakes, ponds, glaciers > 1 km^{2} (0.386 sq mi or 247 acres) and river estuaries.

Sérénac (French pronunciation: [seʁenak]; Occitan: Serenac) is a commune in the Tarn department, southern France.

== See also ==
- Communes of the Tarn department
