= Édouard Vuillard =

French painter (1868–1940)

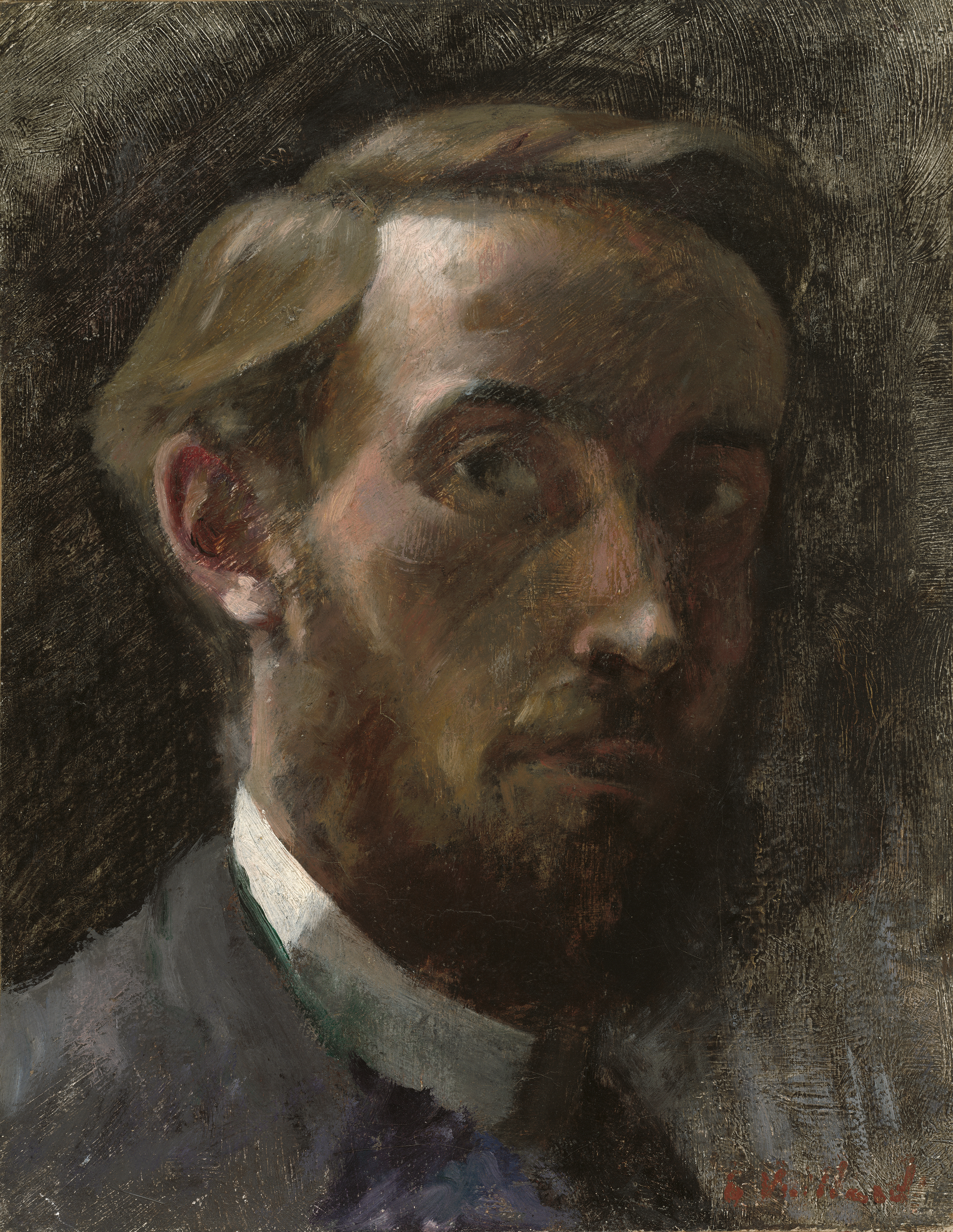
- Self-portrait, 1889, oil on canvas
- Born: 11 November 1868; Cuiseaux, Saône-et-Loire, France
- Died: 21 June 1940 (aged 71); La Baule, Loire-Inférieure, France
- Known for: Painting, printmaking

Signature
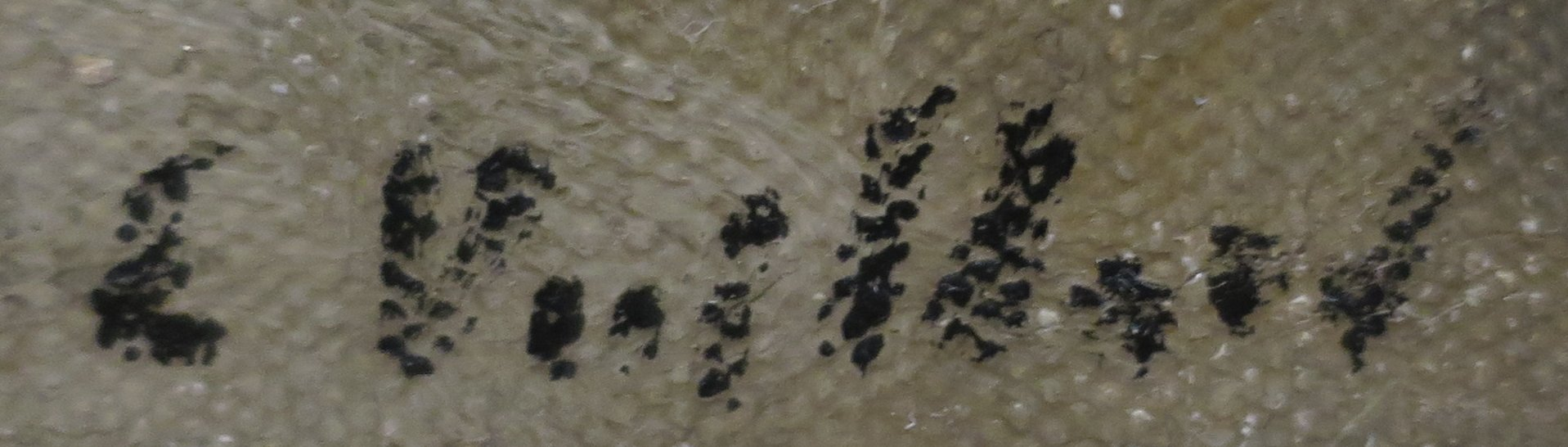

Jean-Édouard Vuillard (French: [ʒɑ̃ edwaʁ vɥijaʁ]; 11 November 1868 – 21 June 1940) was a French painter, decorative artist, and printmaker. From 1891 through 1900, Vuillard was a member of the avant garde artistic group Les Nabis, creating paintings that assembled areas of pure color. His interior scenes, influenced by Japanese prints, explored the spatial effects of flattened planes of color, pattern, and form. As a decorative artist, Vuillard painted theater sets, panels for interior decoration, and designed plates and stained glass. After 1900, when the Nabis broke up, Vuillard adopted a more realistic style, approaching landscapes and interiors with greater detail and vivid colors. In the 1920s and 1930s, he painted portraits of figures in French industry and the arts in their familiar settings.

Vuillard was influenced by Paul Gauguin, among other post-impressionist painters.

== Early life ==
Jean-Édouard Vuillard was born on 11 November 1868 in Cuiseaux (Saône-et-Loire), where he spent his youth. Vuillard's father was a retired naval captain who became a tax collector after leaving the military. His father was 27 years older than his mother, Marie Vuillard (née Michaud), who was a seamstress.

After his father's retirement in 1877, the family settled in Paris at 18 Rue de Chabrol, then moved to a building on Rue Daunou where his mother had a sewing workshop. Vuillard entered a school run by the Marist Brothers. He was awarded a scholarship to attend the prestigious Lycée Fontaine, which in 1883 became the Lycée Condorcet. Vuillard studied rhetoric and art, making drawings of works by Michelangelo and classical sculptures. At the Lycée he met several of the future Nabis, including Ker-Xavier Roussel (Vuillard's future brother in law), Maurice Denis, writer Pierre Véber, and the future actor and theater director Aurélien Lugné-Poe.

In November 1885, when Vuillard left the Lycée, he gave up his original idea of following his father in a military career, and set out to become an artist. He joined Roussel at the studio of painter Diogène Maillart, in the former studio of Eugène Delacroix on Place Fürstenberg. There, Roussel and Vuillard learned the rudiments of painting. In 1885, Vuillard took courses at the Académie Julian, and frequented the studios of the academic painters William-Adolphe Bouguereau and Robert-Fleury. However, he failed in the competitions to enter the École des Beaux-Arts in February and July 1886 and again in February 1887. In July 1887, the persistent Vuillard was accepted, and was placed in the course of Robert-Fleury, then in 1888 with the academic history painter Jean-Léon Gérôme. In 1888 and 1889, he pursued his studies in academic art. He painted a self-portrait with his friend Waroquoy, and had a crayon portrait of his grandmother accepted for the Salon of 1889. At the end of that academic year, and after a brief period of military service, he set out to become an artist.

== Les Nabis ==
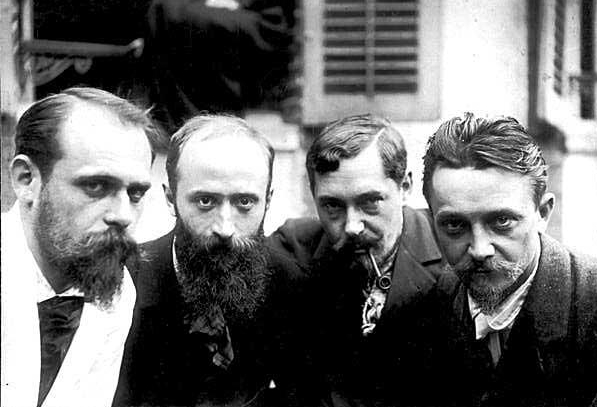
Ker-Xavier Roussel, Édouard Vuillard, Romain Coolus, Félix Vallotton, 1899

Late in 1889, Vuillard began to frequent meetings of the informal group of artists known as Les Nabis, or The prophets, a semi-secret, semi-mystical club that included Maurice Denis and some of his other friends from the Lycée. In 1888, the young painter Paul Sérusier had traveled to Brittany, where, under the direction of Paul Gauguin, he had made a nearly abstract painting of the seaport, composed of areas of color. This composition, The Talisman, became the first Nabi painting. Serusier and his friend Pierre Bonnard, Maurice Denis and Paul Ranson, were among the first Nabis of nabiim, dedicated to transforming art down to its foundations. In 1890, through Denis, Vuillard became a member of the group, which met in Ransom's studio or in the cafes of the Passage Brady. The existence of the organization was in theory secret, and members used coded nicknames; Vuillard became the Nabi Zouave, because of his military service.

Vuillard first worked on theater decoration. He shared a studio at 28 Rue Pigalle with Bonnard with the theater impresario Lugné-Poe, and the theater critic Georges Rousel. There, Vuillard designed sets for several works by Maeterlinck and other symbolist writers. In 1891, he took part in his first exposition with the Nabis at the Chateau of Saint-Germain-en-Laye. He showed two paintings, including The Woman in a Striped Dress. The reviews were largely good, but the critic of Le Chat Noir wrote of "Works still indecisive, where one finds the features in style, literary shadows, sometimes a tender harmony." (19 September 1891).

Vuillard began keeping a journal during this time, which records the formation of his artistic philosophy. "We perceive nature through the senses which give us images of forms, sounds, colors, etc." he wrote on 22 November 1888, shortly before he became a Nabi. "A form or a color exists only in relation to another. Form does not exist on its own. We can only conceive of the relations." In 1890 he returned to the same idea: "Let's look at a painting as a set of relations that are definitely detached from any idea of naturalism."

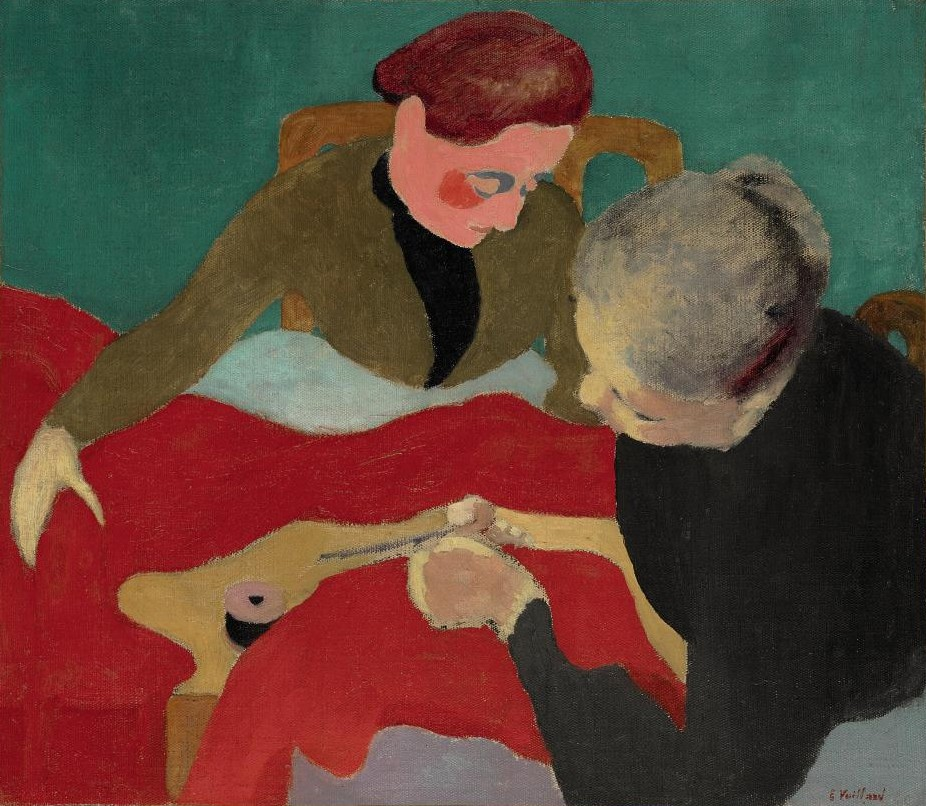
The Seamstresses, 1890, private collection.

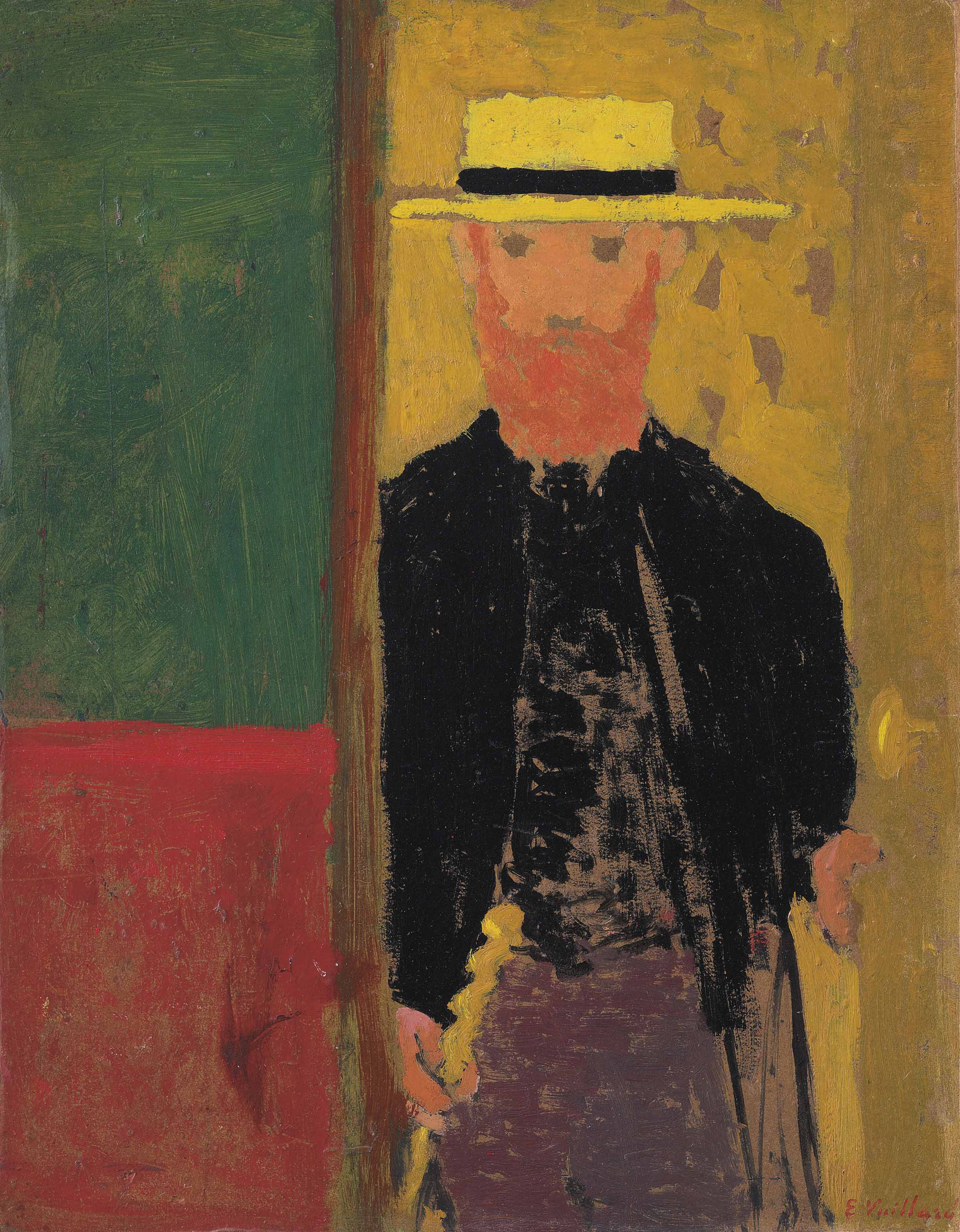
Self-portrait with cane and straw hat, 1891–92, private collection.

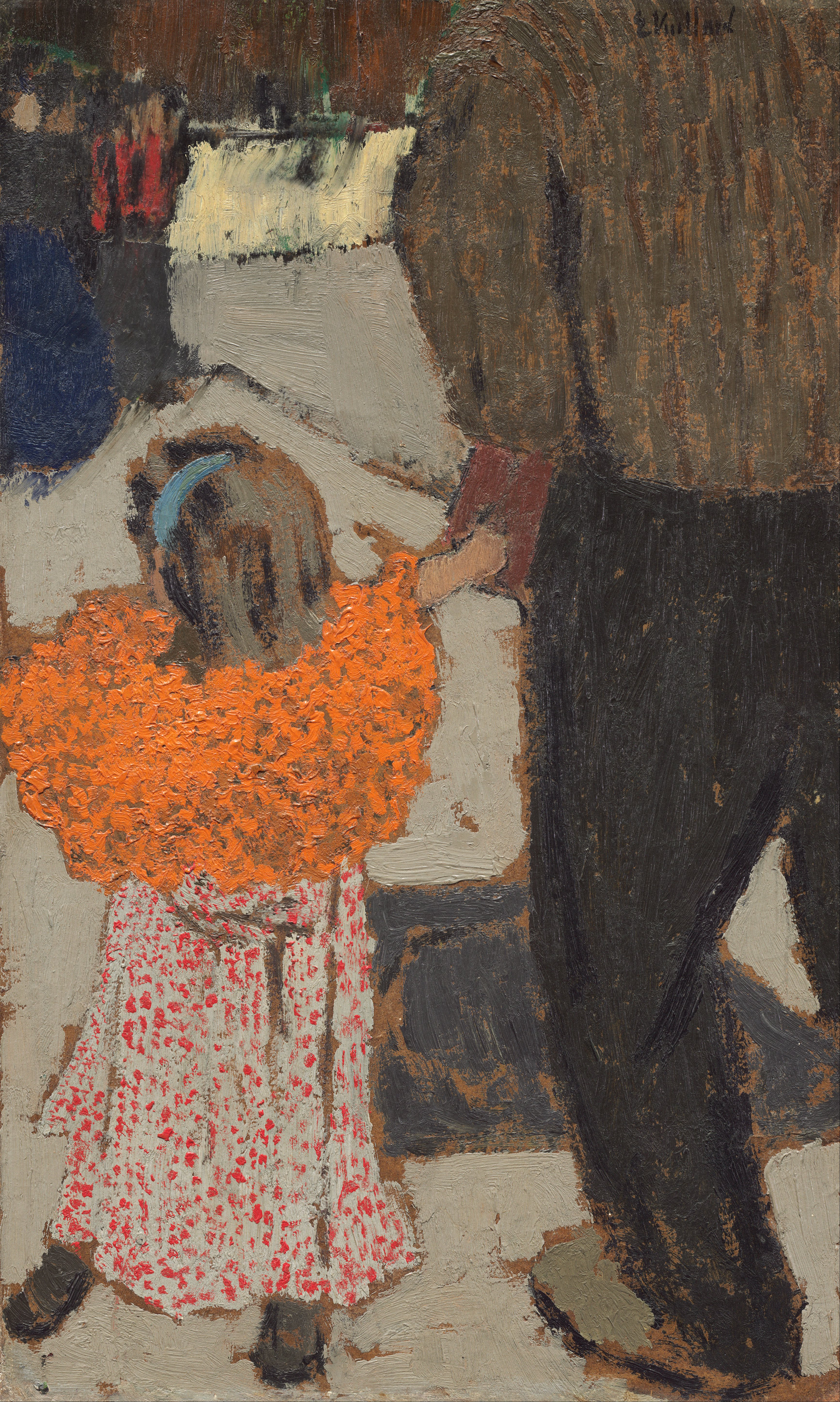
Child in an orange shawl, 1894–95, National Gallery of Art, Washington DC.

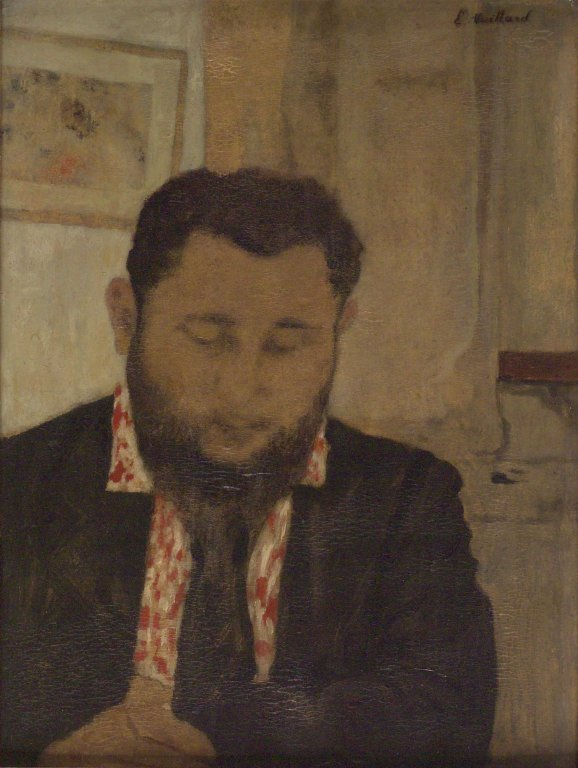
Portrait of Thadée Natanson, 1897, Brooklyn Museum.

=== The Japanese influence ===
The works of Vuillard and the Nabis were strongly influenced by Japanese woodblock prints, which were shown in Paris at the gallery of art dealer Siegfried Bing, and at a large show at the École des Beaux Arts in 1890. Vuillard himself acquired a personal collection of 180 prints, some of which are visible in the backgrounds of his paintings. The Japanese influence appeared particularly in his work in the negation of depth, the simplicity of forms, and strongly contrasting colors. The faces were often turned away, and drawn with just a few lines. There was no attempt to create perspective. Vegetal, floral and geometric designs in the wallpaper or clothing were more important than the faces. In some of Vuillard's works, the persons in the paintings almost entirely disappeared into the designs of the wallpaper. The Japanese influence continued in his later, post-Nabi works, particularly in the painted screens depicting Place Vintimille he made for Marguerite Chaplin.

=== Decoration ===
Vuillard, like other members of the Nabis, believed that decorative art was equal to traditional easel painting. Vuillard created theatrical sets and programs, decorative murals and painted screens, prints, designs for stained glass windows, and ceramic plates. In the early 1890s, he worked especially for the Théâtre de l'Œuvre of Lugné-Poe designing backdrops and programs.

From theater decoration, Vuillard soon moved into interior decoration. In the course of his theater work, he met brothers Alexandre and Thadée Natanson, the founders of La Revue Blanche, a cultural review. Vuillard's graphics appeared in the journal, together with Pierre Bonnard, Henri de Toulouse-Lautrec, Félix Vallotton and others. In 1892, on a commission for Natanson brothers, Vuillard painted his first decorations ("apartment frescoes") for the house of Mme Desmarais. He made other items in 1894 for Alexandre Natanson, and in 1898 for Claude Anet.

Vuillard used some of the same techniques he had used in the theater for making scenery, such as peinture à la colle, or distemper, which allowed him to make large panels more quickly. This method, originally used in Renaissance frescoes, involved using rabbit-skin glue as a binder mixed with chalk and white pigment to make gesso, a smooth coating applied to wood panels or canvas, on which the painting was made. This allowed the painter to achieve finer detail and color than on canvas, and was waterproof. In 1892, Vuillard received his first decorative commission to make six paintings to be placed above the doorways of the salon of the family of Paul Desmarais. He designed his panels and murals to fit into the architectural setting and the interests of the client.

In 1894, Vuillard and the other Nabis received a commission from art gallery owner Siegfried Bing, who had given Art Nouveau its name, to design stained glass windows to be made by the American firm of Louis Tiffany. Their designs were displayed in 1895 at the Société Nationale des Beaux-Arts, but the actual windows were never made. In 1895, he designed a series of decorative porcelain plates, decorated with faces and figures of women in modern dress, immersed in floral designs. The plates, along with his design for the Tiffany window and the decorative panels made for the Natansons, were displayed at the opening of Bing's gallery Maison de l'Art Nouveau in December 1895.

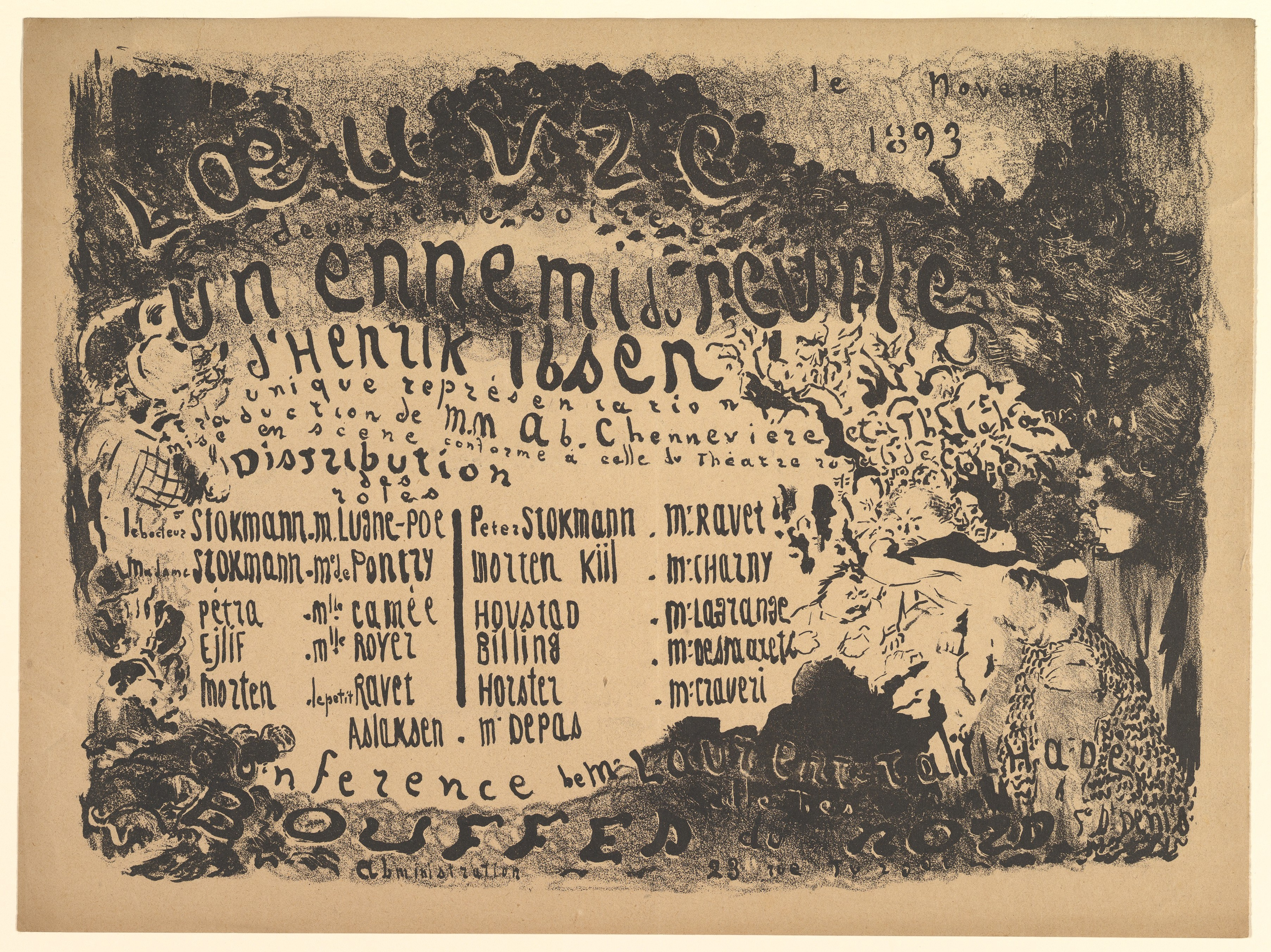
Theater program for Ibsen's An Enemy of the People at the Théâtre de l'Oeuvre, (November 1893)

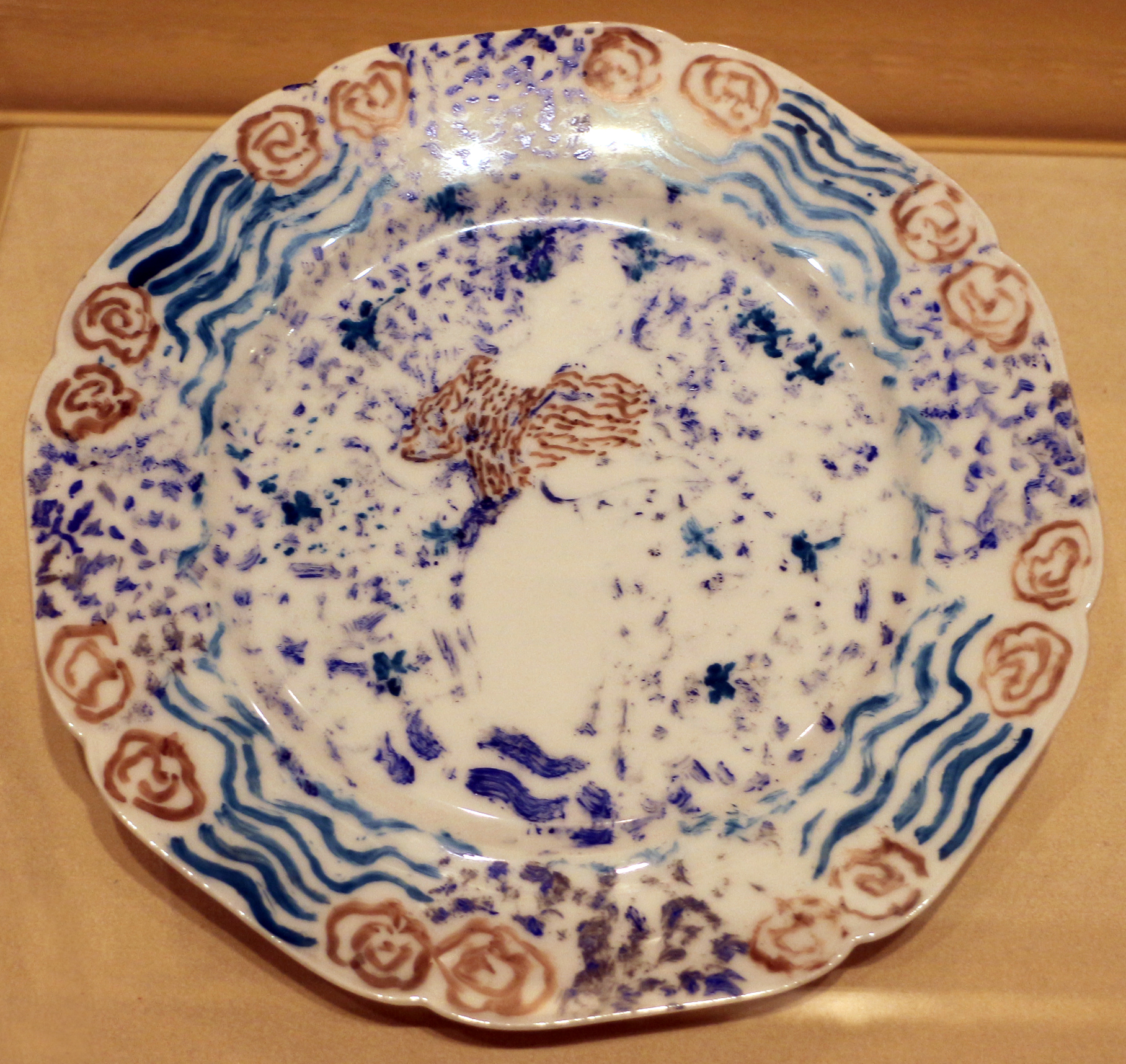
Édouard Vuillard, Ceramic plate depicting a woman in a striped blouse, (1895)

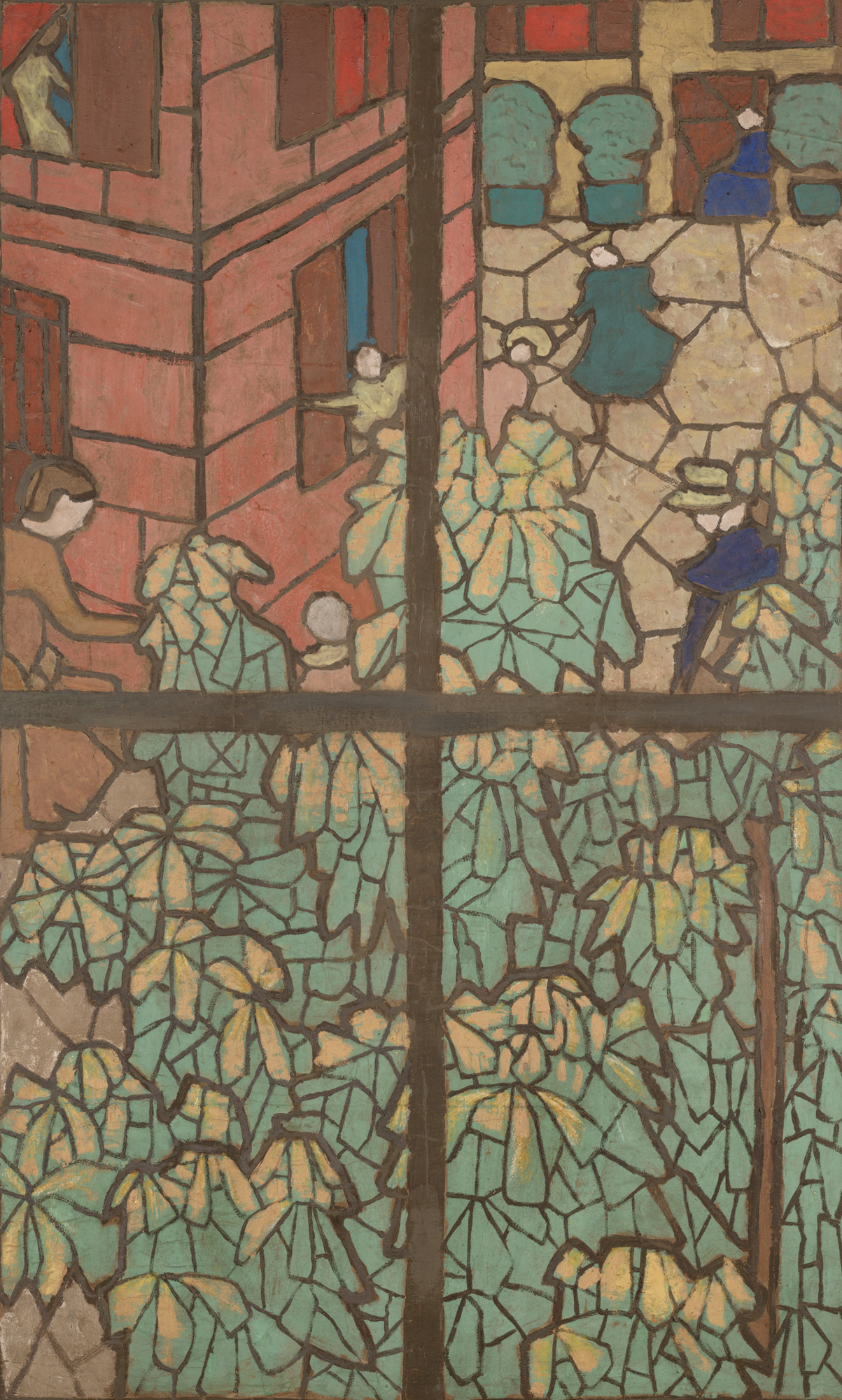
The Chestnuts a design for a stained-glass window for Louis Tiffany (1894–95)

=== The Public Gardens ===
Some of Vuillard's best-known works, including Les Jardins Publiques (The Public Gardens) and Figures dans un Interieur (Figures in an Interior) were made for the Natanson brothers, whom he had known at the Lycée Condorcet, and for their friends. They gave Vuillard freedom to choose the subjects and style. Between 1892 and 1899, Vuillard made eight cycles of decorative paintings, with altogether some thirty panels. The murals, though rarely displayed during his lifetime, later became among his most famous works.

The Public Gardens is a series of six panels depicting children in the parks of Paris. The patrons, Alexander Natanson and his wife Olga, had three young daughters. The paintings show a variety of different inspirations, including the medieval tapestries at the Hotel de Cluny in Paris that Vuillard greatly appreciated. For this series Vuillard did not use oil paint, but peinture à la colle, a method he had used in painting theater sets, which required him to work very quickly, but allowed him to make modifications and to achieve the appearance of frescoes. He received the commission on 24 August 1894, and completed the series at the end of the same year. They were installed in the dining room/salon of the Natansons.

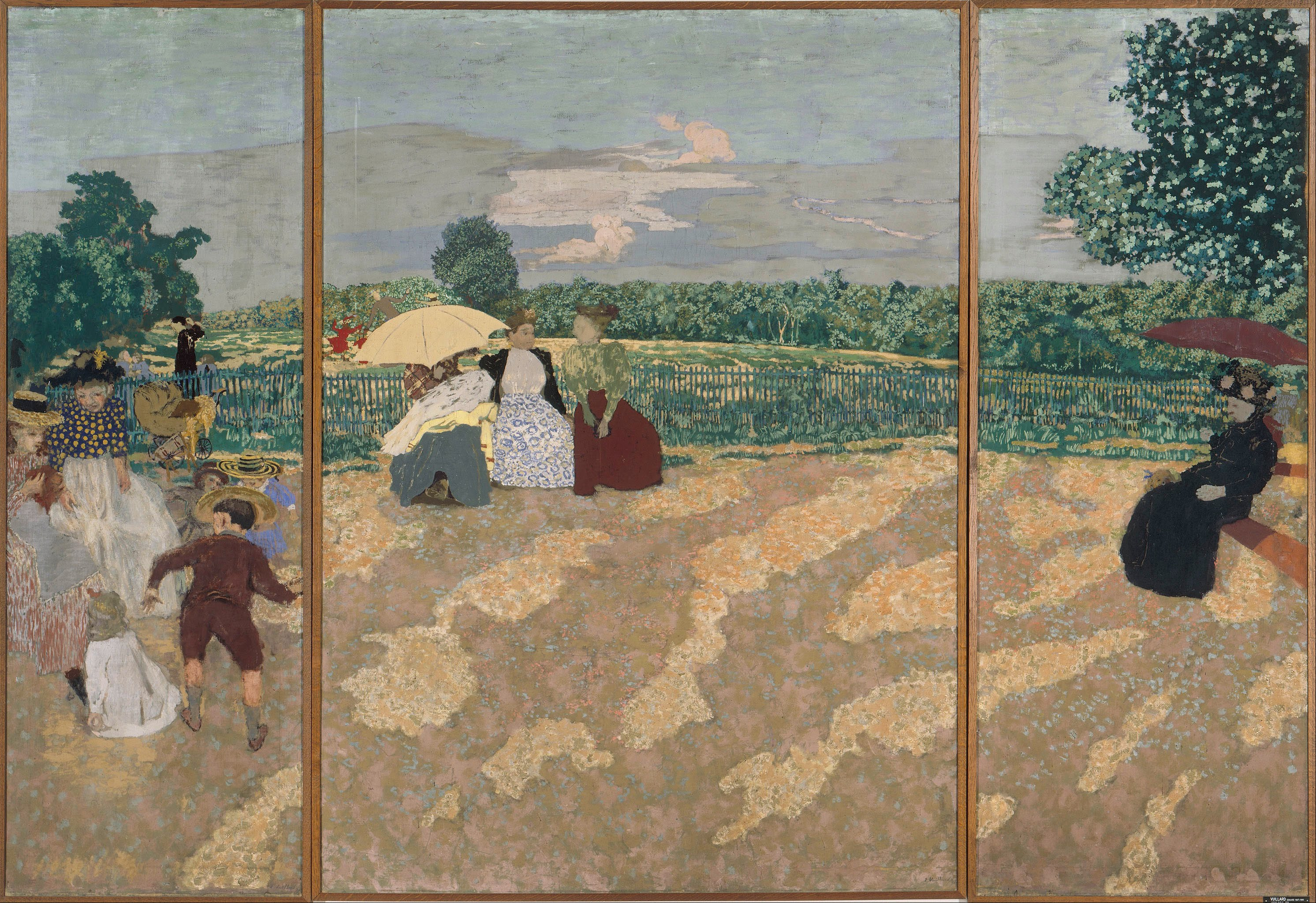
Decorative screen, The Public Gardens - The Nurses (left), The conversation (center), The Red Umbrella (right), Paris, Musée d'Orsay (1894)

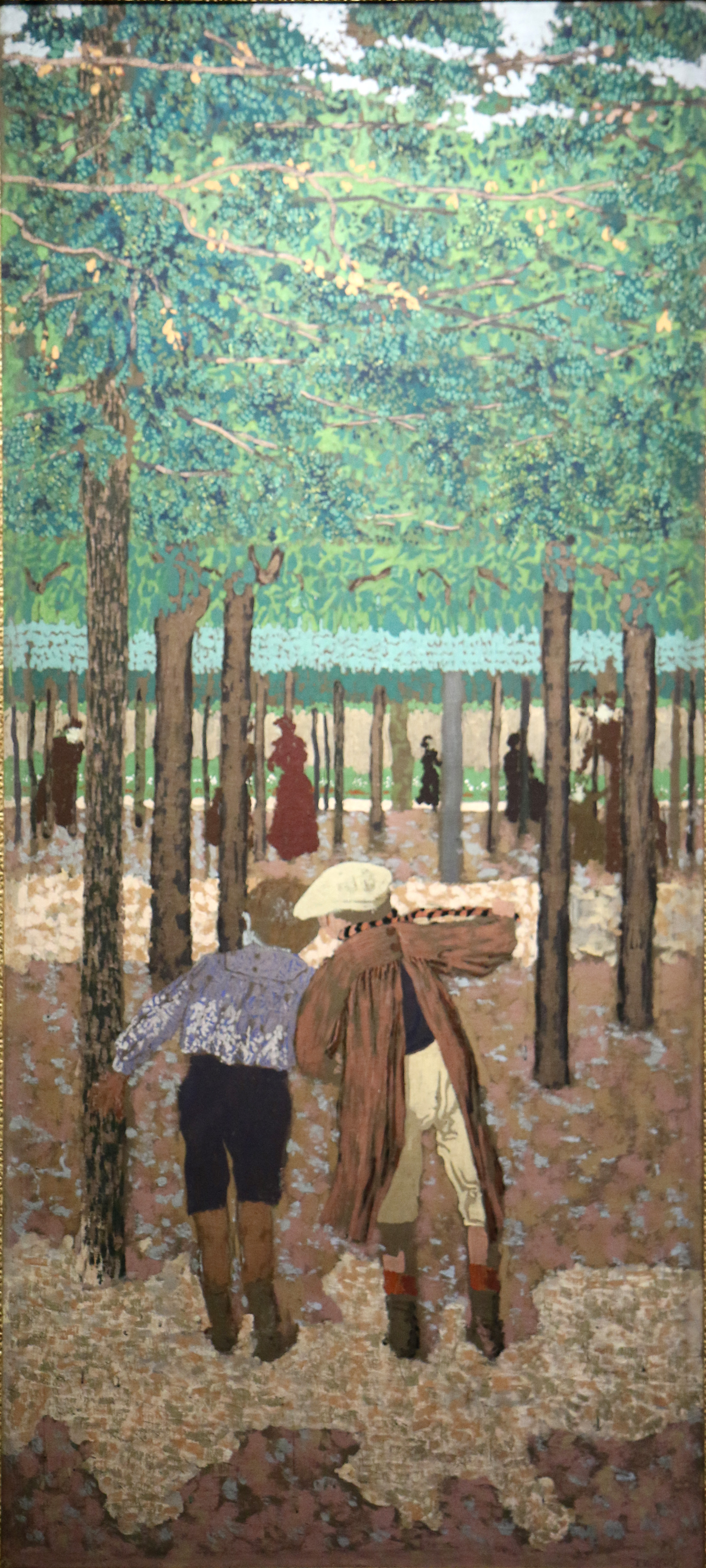
Public Gardens - The two schoolboys (1894), Royal Museums of Fine Arts of Belgium

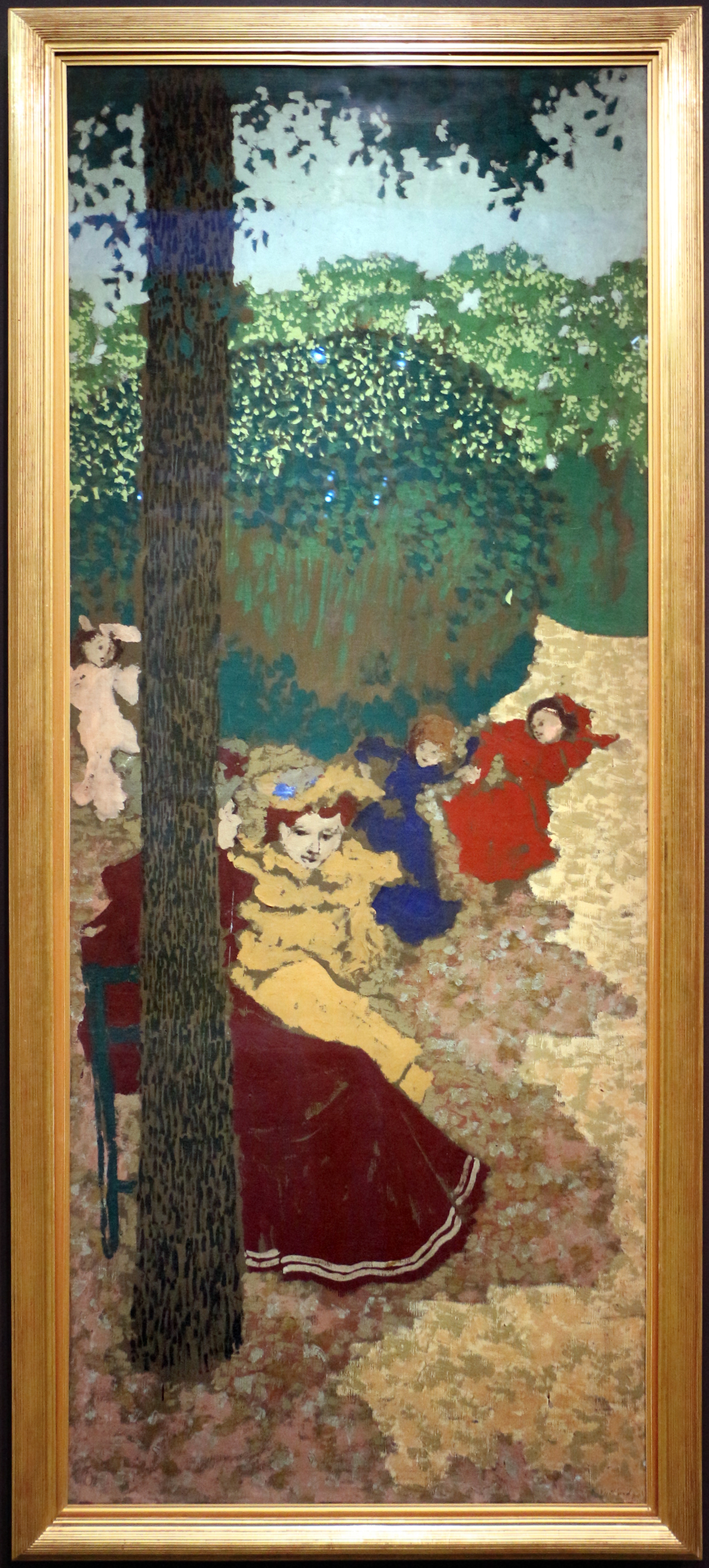
Public Gardens - Girls playing (1894), Paris, Musée d'Orsay

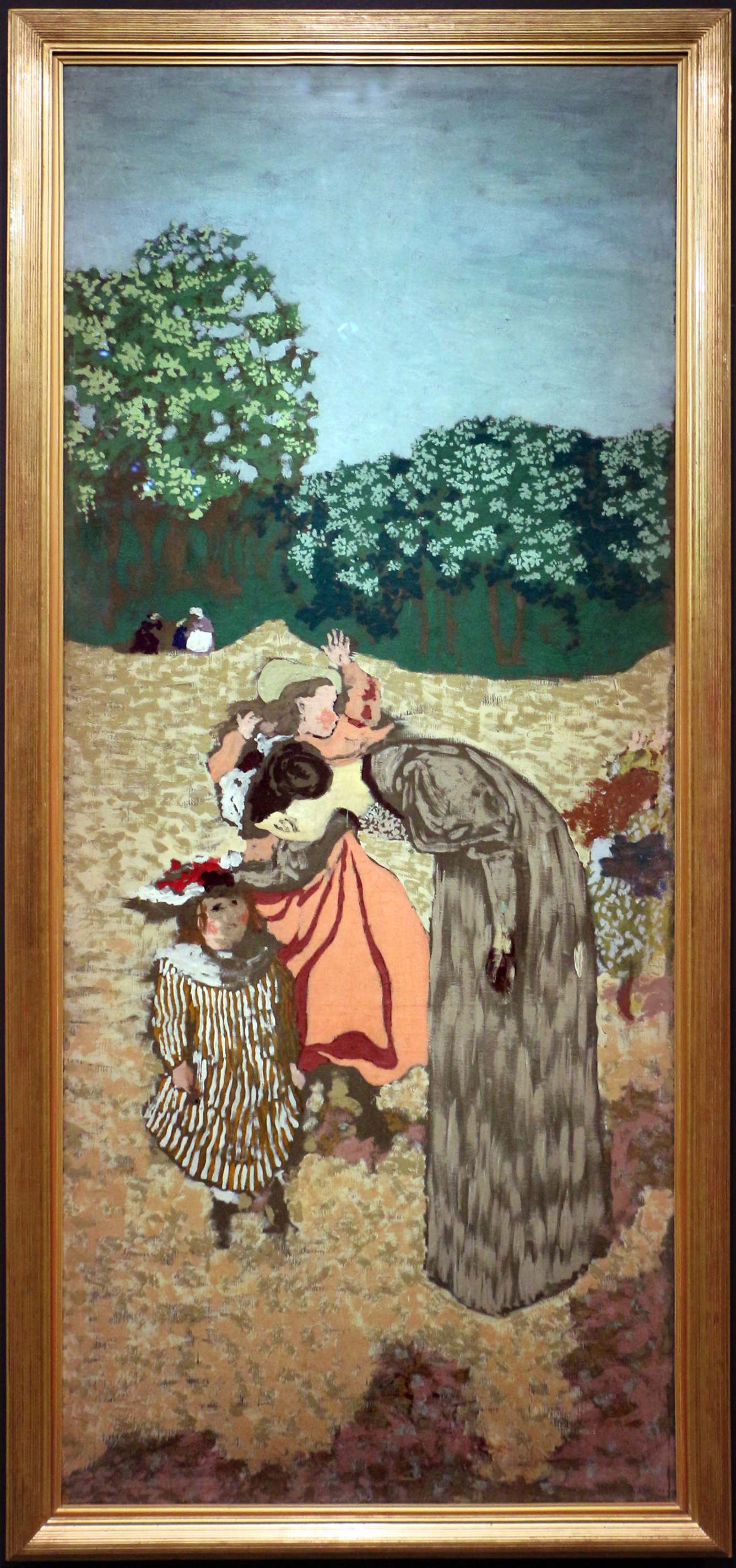
Public Gardens - Questions (1894), Paris, Musée d'Orsay

=== Interior scenes ===
Vuillard frequently painted interior scenes, usually of women in a workplace, at home, or in a garden. The faces and features of the figures in these scenes are rarely articulated in detail; instead Vuillard often places greater focus on the patterns and planes of wallpaper, carpets, and furnishings.

Vuillard wrote in his journal in 1890, "In the decoration of an apartment, and overly-precise subject can easily become intolerable. One might less quickly get tired of a textile, or drawings without too much literal precision." He also preferred to populate his interiors with women. As he wrote in his journal in 1894, "When my attention is directed toward men, I see only gross caricatures... I never feel so with women, where I always find the means to isolate a few elements which satisfy me as a painter. It's not that men are uglier than women, they're only so in my imagination."

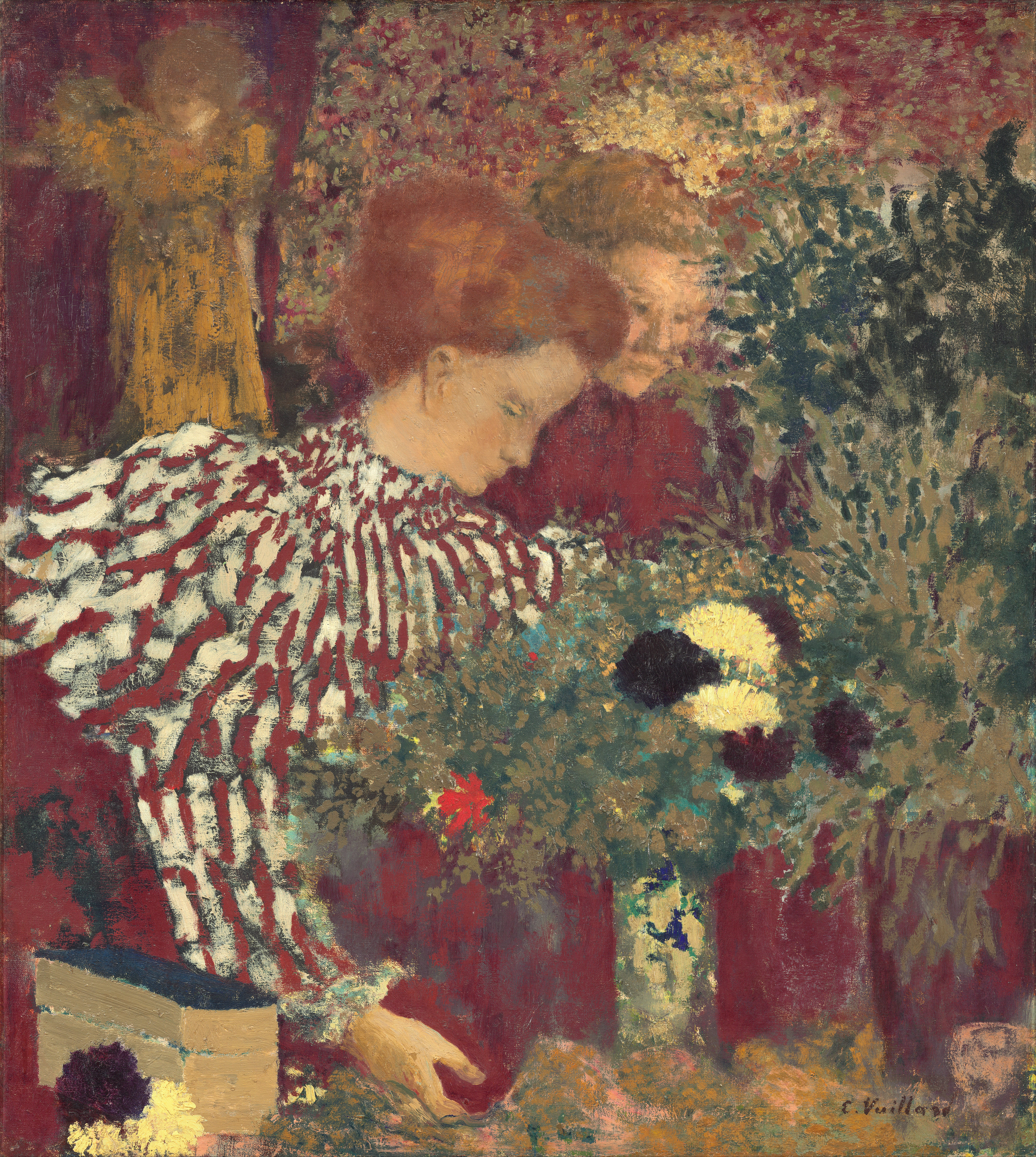
Woman in a Striped Dress (1895), National Gallery of Art, Washington D.C.

Vuillard painted a series of paintings of seamstresses in the workshop of a dressmaker, based on the workshop of his mother. In La Robe à Ramages (The Flowered Dress; 1891), the women in the workshop are assembled out of areas of color. The faces, seen from the side, have no details. The patterns of their costumes and the decor dominate the pictures. The figures include his grandmother, to the left, and his sister Marie, in the bold patterned dress that is a central feature of the painting. He also placed a mirror on the wall to the left, a device which allowed him to give two points of view simultaneously and to reflect and distort the scene. The result is a work that is deliberately flattened and decorative.

Seamstress with Chiffons (1893) also presents a seamstress at work, seated in front of a window. Her face is obscure and the image appears almost flat, dominated by the floral patterns of the wall.

In 1895, Vuillard received a commission from the cardiologist Henri Vaquez for four panels to decorate the library of his Paris house at 27 rue du Général Foy. The primary subjects were women engaged in playing the piano, sewing, and other solitary occupations in a highly decorated bourgeois apartment. The one man in the series, presumably Vaquez himself, is shown in his library reading, paying little attention to the woman sewing next to him. The figures in the panels are almost entirely integrated into the elaborate wallpaper, carpet, and patterns of the dresses of the women. Art critics immediately compared the works to medieval tapestries. The paintings, completed in 1896, were originally titled simply People in Interiors but later critics added subtitles: Music, Work, The Choice of Books, and Intimacy. They are now in the Museum of the Petit Palais in Paris.

In 1897, Vuillard interiors showed a noticeable change, with Large Interior with Six Persons. The picture was much more complex in its perspective, depth and color, with carpets arranged in different angles, and the figures scattered around the room more recognizable. It was also complex in its subject matter. The setting appears to be the apartment of the Nabi painter Paul Ranson, reading a book; Madame Vuillard seated in an armchair, Ida Rousseau coming in the door, and her daughter Germaine Rousseau, standing at the left. The unstated subject was the romantic affair between Ker-Xavier Roussel and Germaine Rousseau, his sister-in-law, which shocked the Nabis.

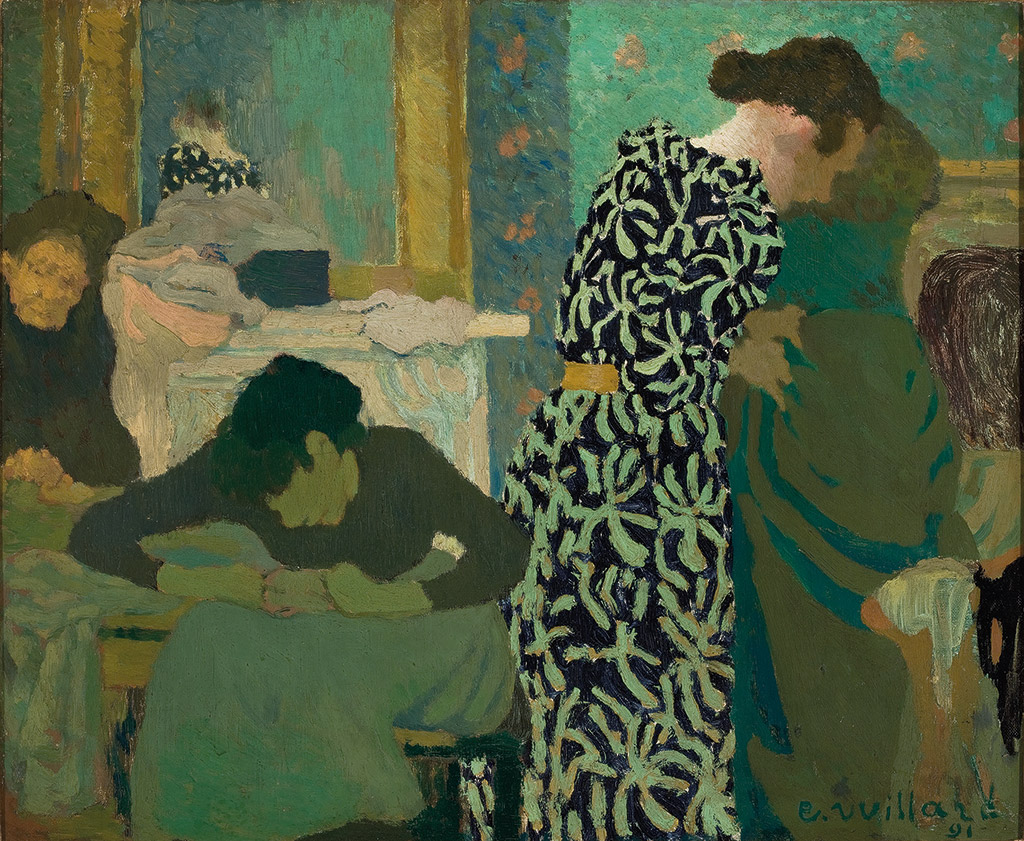
La Robe À Ramages (The flowered dress), 1891, São Paulo Museum of Art

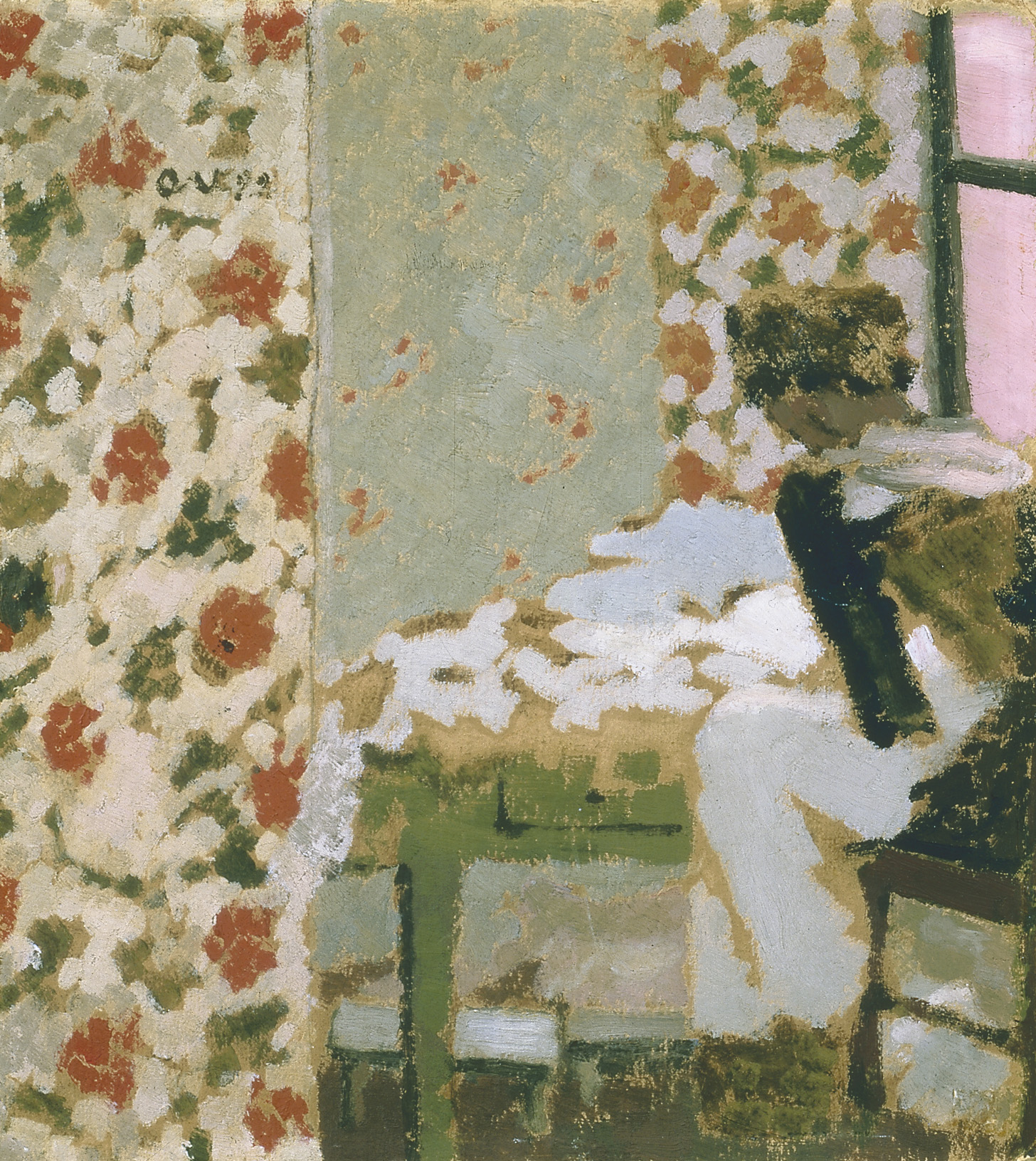
The Seamstress with Chiffons (1893), Indianapolis Museum of Art

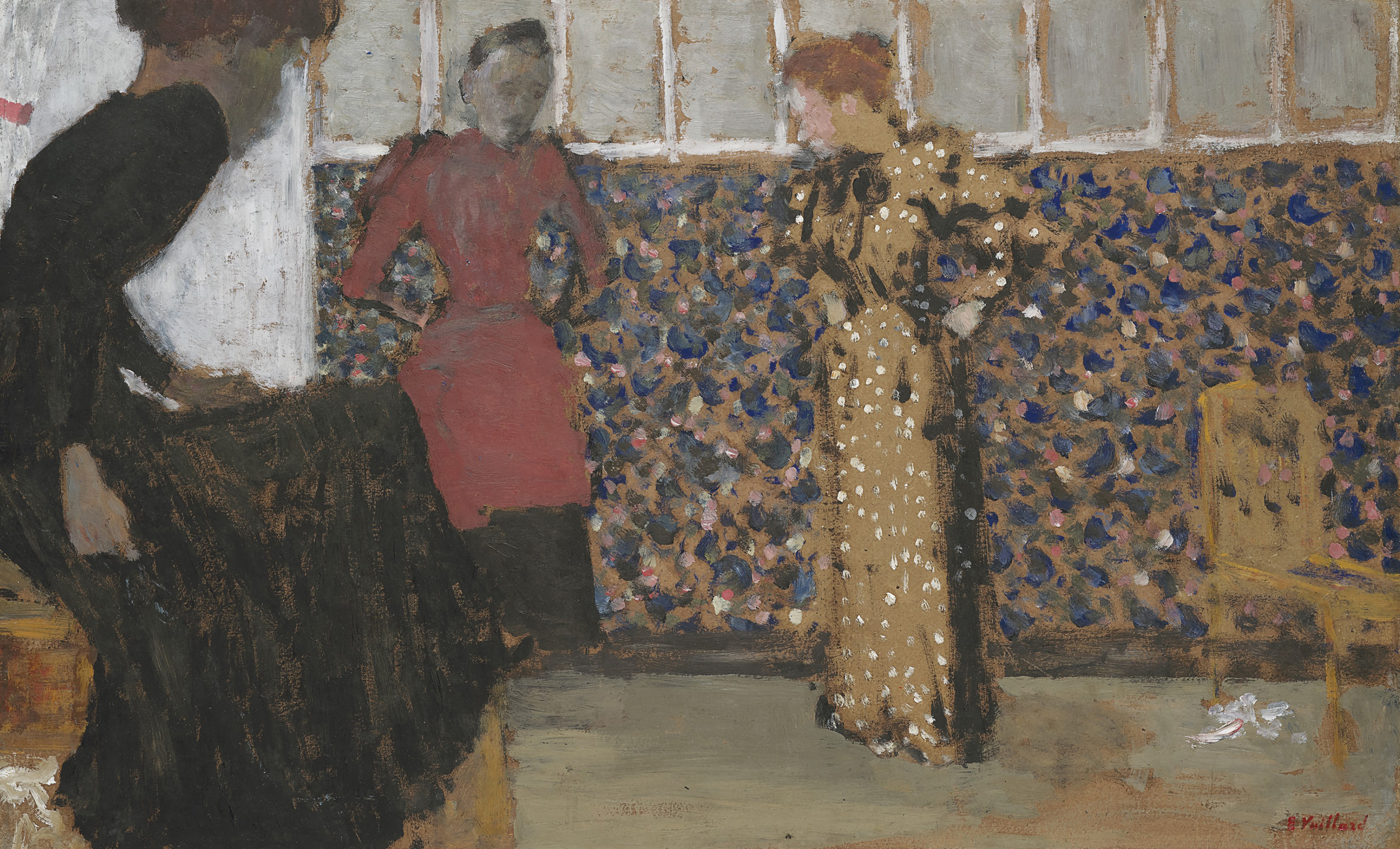
Three women in conversation (1893)

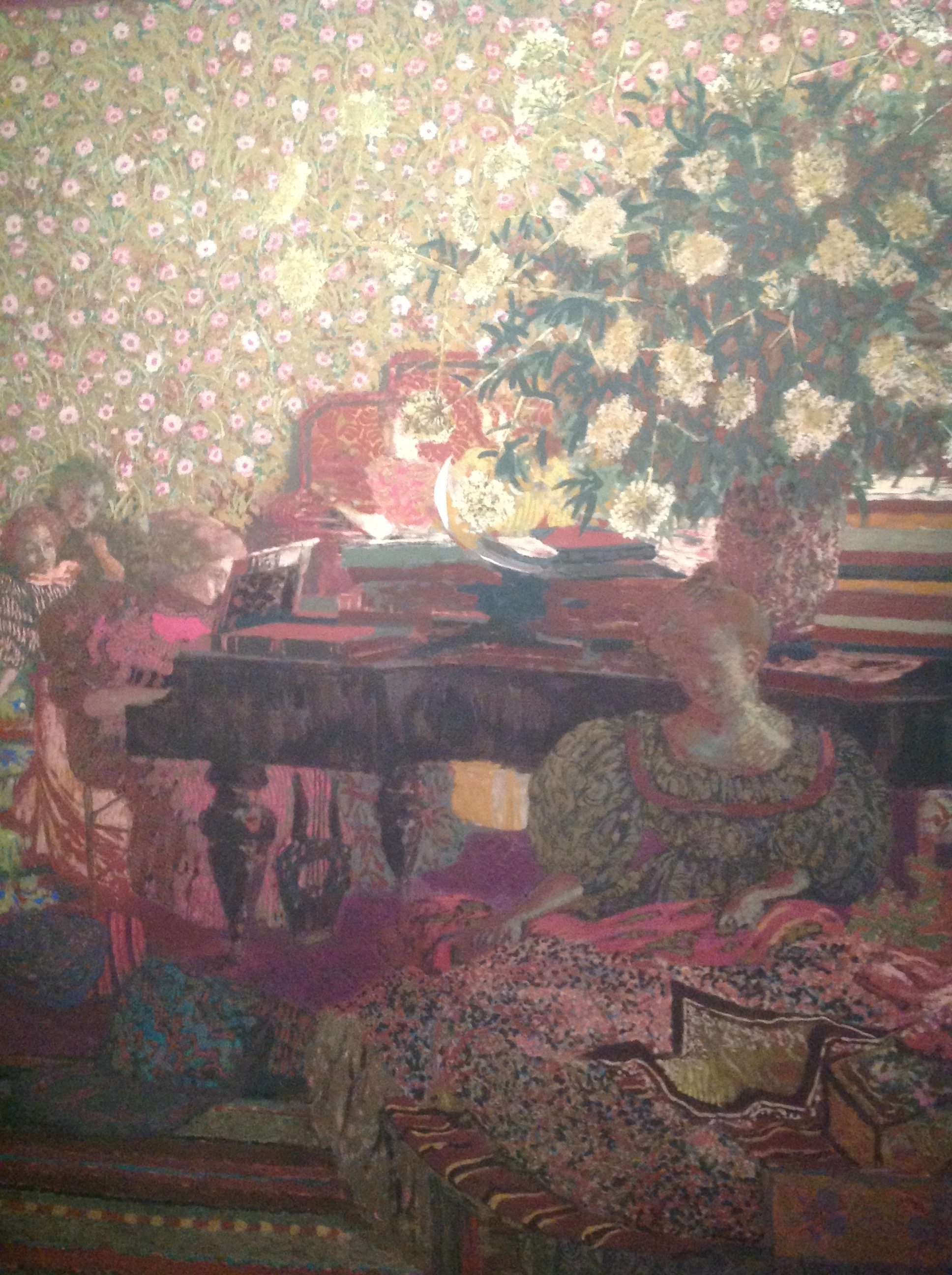
Persons in an interior - Music (1896), decorative panel

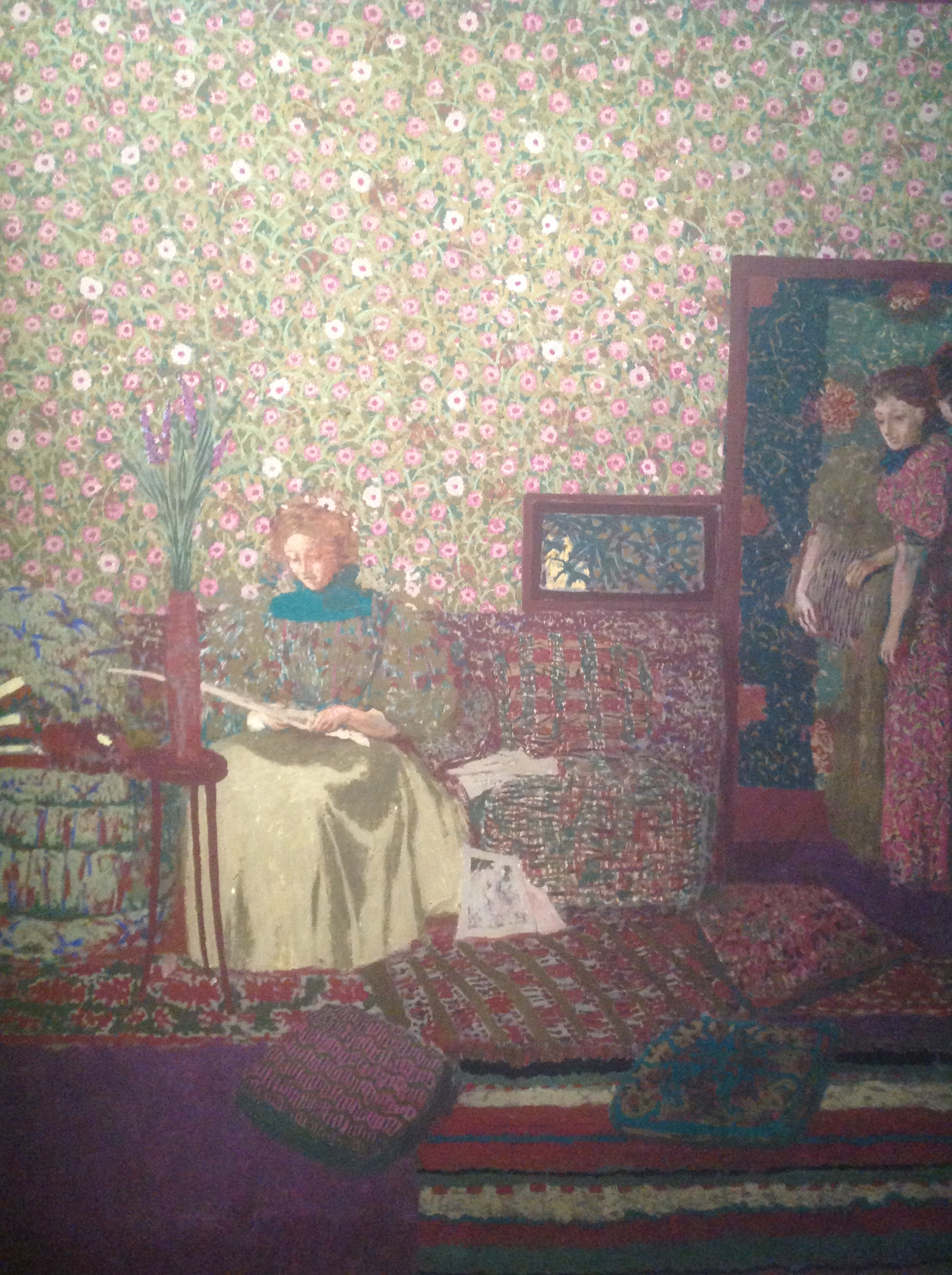
Persons in an Interior - Intimacy (1896), decorative panel

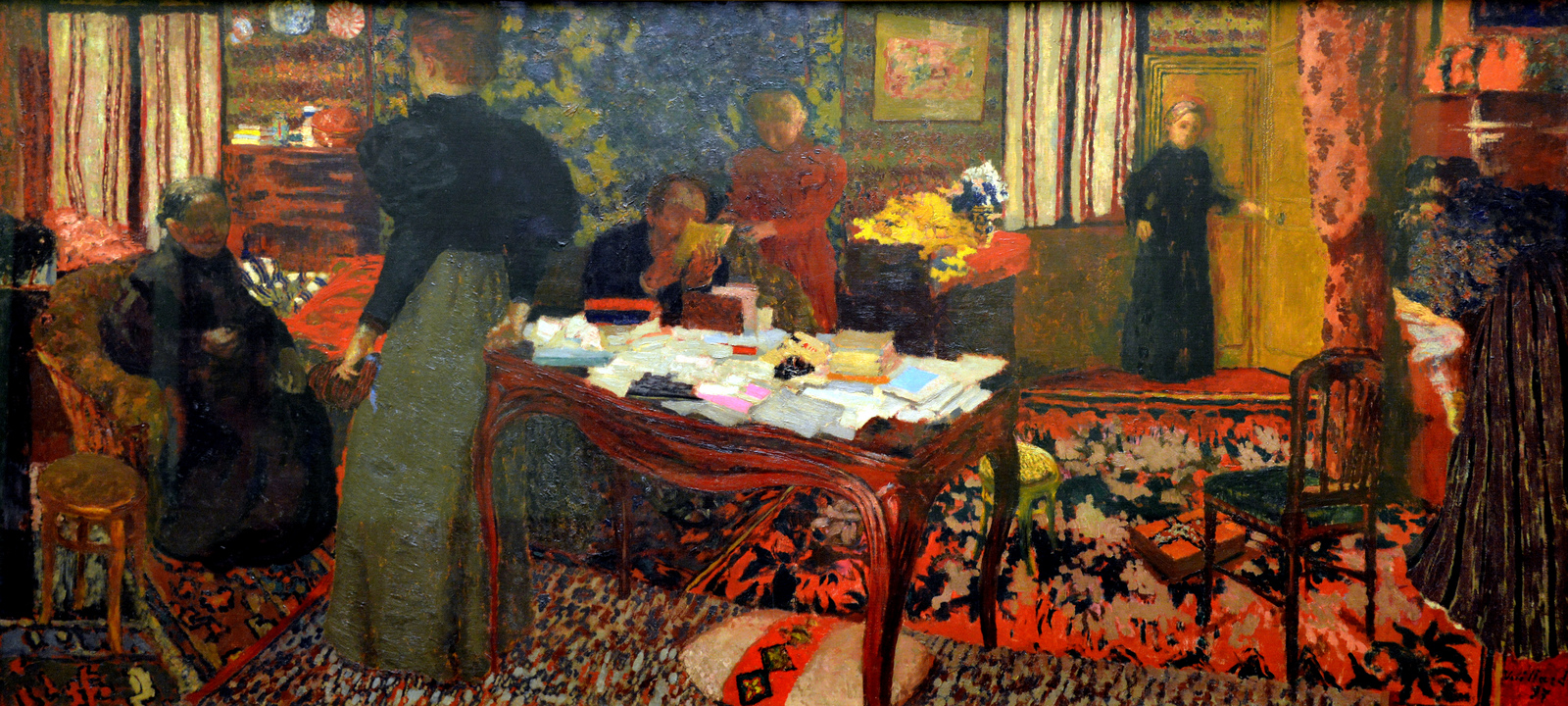
Large Interior with Six Persons (1897), Kunsthaus Zürich

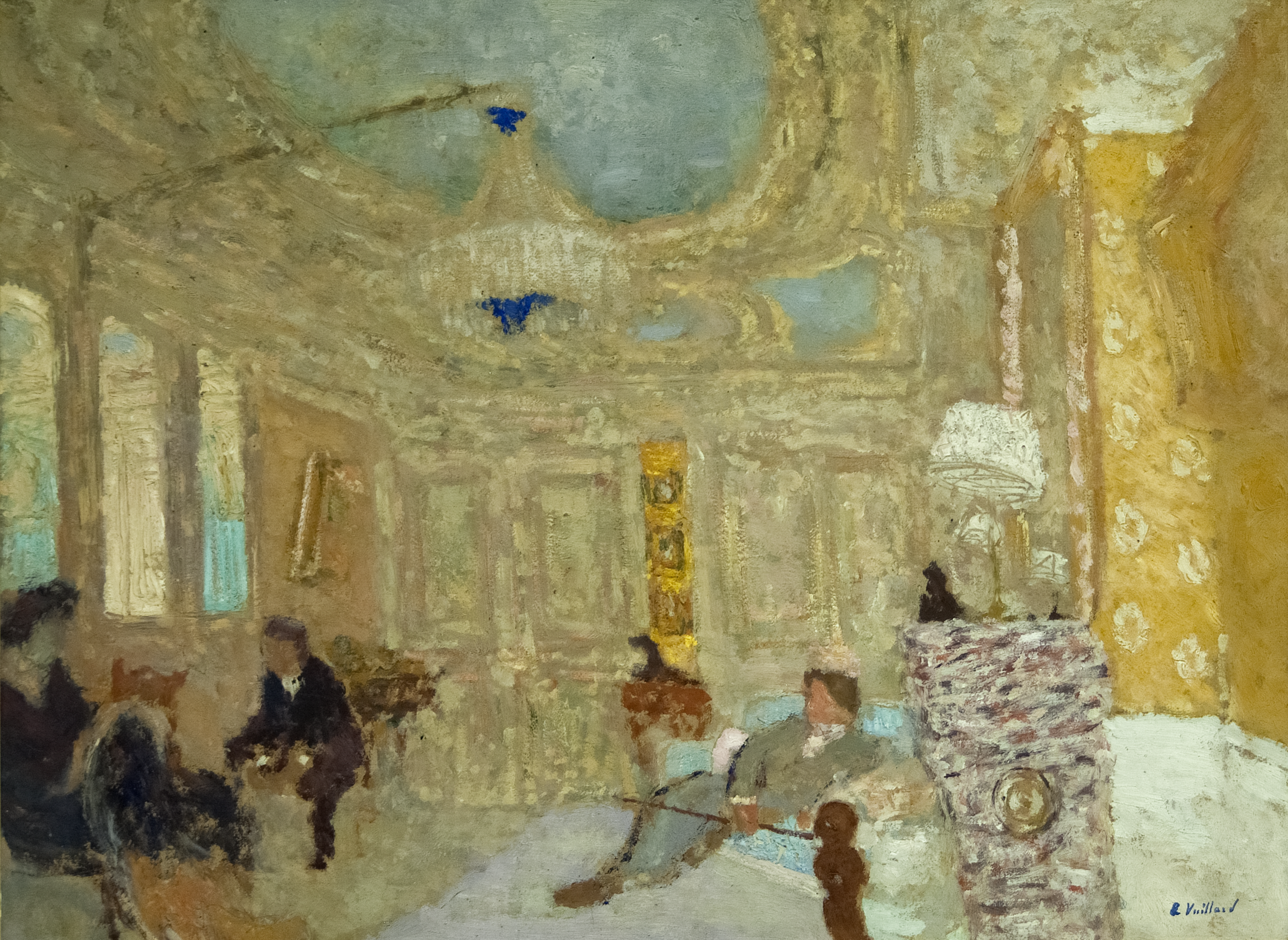
In the Waiting Room (1898), The Thiel Gallery, Stockholm

Toulouse-Lautrec Cooking (1898), Musée Toulouse-Lautrec

== After the Nabis (1900–1914) ==
The Nabis went their separate ways after their exposition in 1900. They had always had different styles, though they shared common ideas and ideals about art. The separation was made deeper by the Dreyfus Affair (1894–1908), which split French society. Dreyfus was a Jewish French army officer falsely accused of treason and sentenced to a penal colony before finally being exonerated. Among the Nabis, Vuillard and Pierre Bonnard supported Dreyfus, while Maurice Denis and Sérusier supported the side of the French army.

After the separation of the Nabis in 1900, Vuillard's artistic style and subjects changed. He gradually abandoned the close, crowded, and dark interiors he had painted before 1900 and began to paint more outdoors with natural light. He continued to paint interiors, but the interiors had more light and color, more depth, and the faces and features were clearer. The effects of the light became primary components of his paintings, whether they were interior scenes or the parks and streets of Paris. Vuillard gradually returned to naturalism. He held his second large personal exhibition at the Gallerie Bernheim-Jeune in November 1908, where he presented many of his new landscapes. Vuillard was praised by one anti-modernist critic for "his delicious protest against systematic deformations."

In 1912, Vuillard, Bonnard and Roussel were nominated for the Légion d'honneur, but all three refused the honor. "I do not seek any other compensation for my efforts than the esteem of people with taste," Vuillard told a journalist.

In 1912, Vuillard painted Théodore Duret in his Study, a commissioned portrait that signaled a new phase in Vuillard's work, which was dominated by portraiture from 1920 onwards.

Vuillard served as a juror with Florence Meyer Blumenthal in awarding the Prix Blumenthal, a grant given between 1919–1954 to young French painters, sculptors, decorators, engravers, writers, and musicians.

=== New interiors, cityscapes and gardens ===
After 1900, Vuillard continued to paint numerous domestic interiors and gardens, but in a more naturalistic, colorful style than he had used as a Nabi. Though the faces of the persons were still often looking away, the interiors had depth, a richness of detail, and warmer colors. He particularly captured the play of the sunlight on the gardens and his subjects. He did not want to return to the past, but wanted to move into the future with a vision that was more decorative, naturalistic and familiar than that of the modernists.

He made new series of decorative panels, depicting urban scenes and parks in Paris, as well as many interior scenes of Paris shops and homes. He depicted the galleries of the Louvre Museum and the Museum of Decorative Arts, the chapel of the Palace of Versailles.

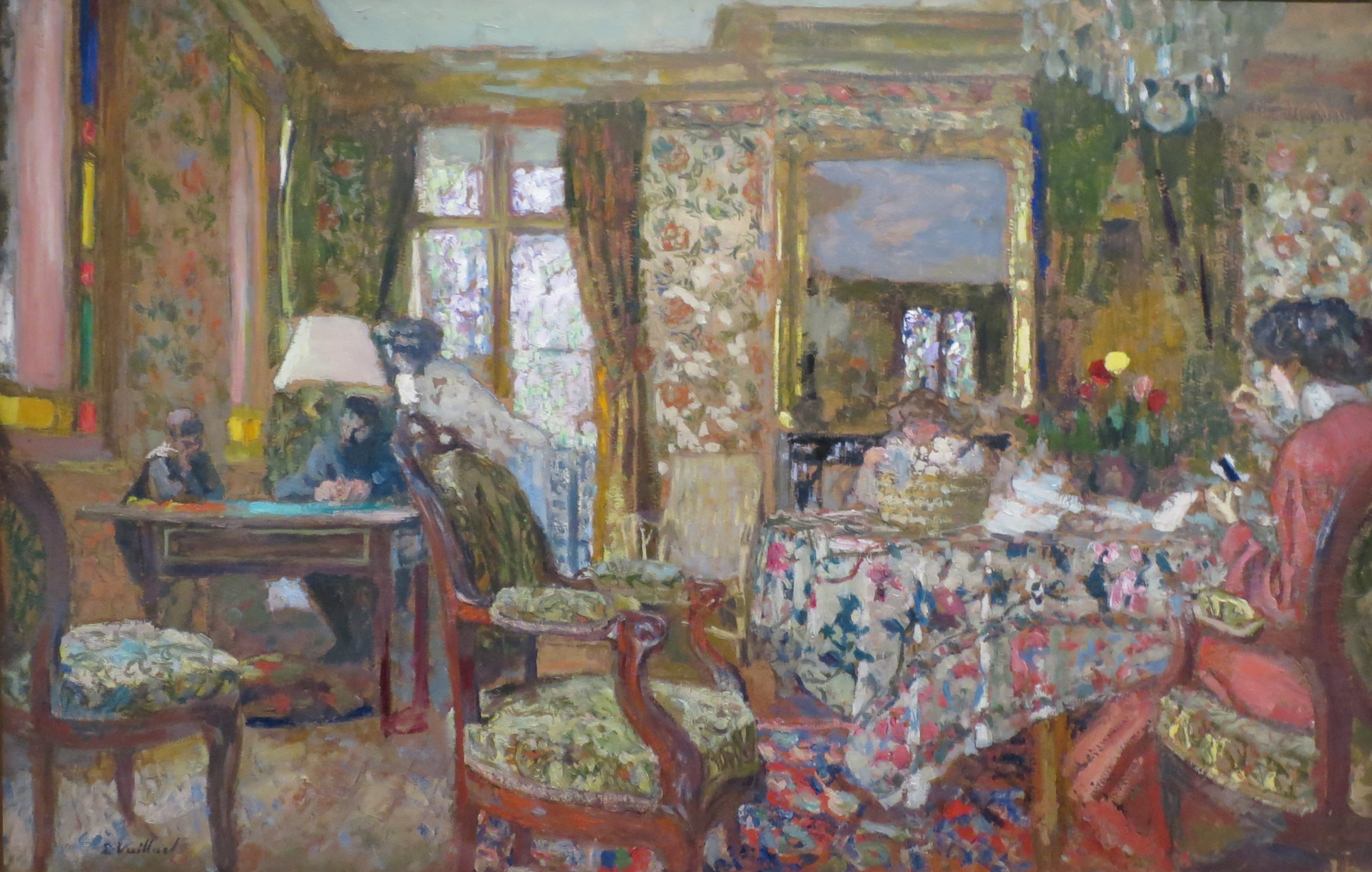
Interior (1904), Pushkin Museum

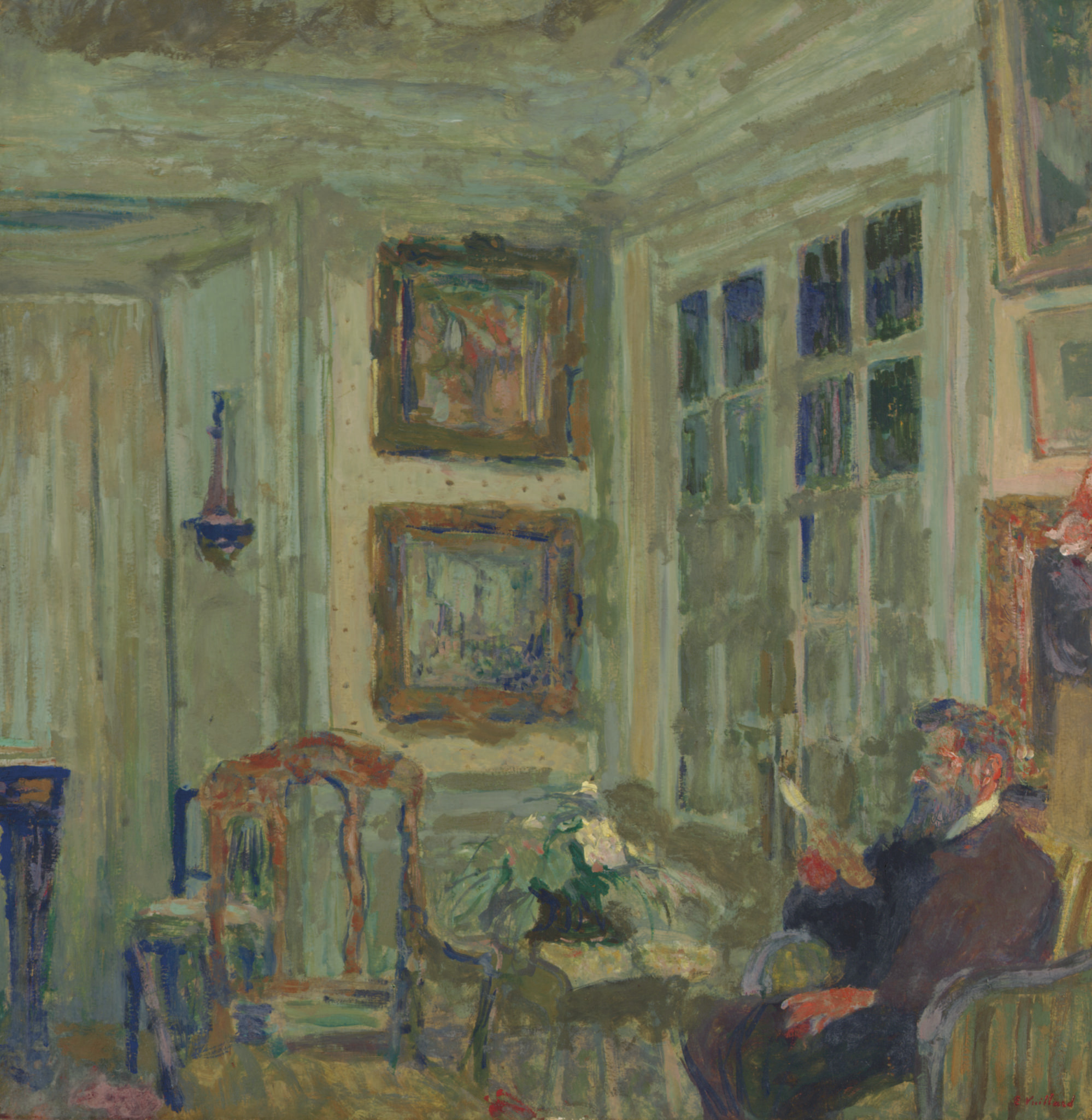
Arthur Fontaine reading (1904)

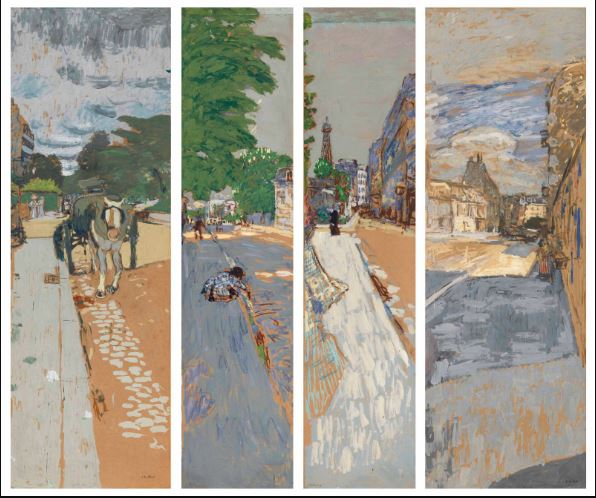
Streets of Paris decorative panels. First series, Passy (1908)

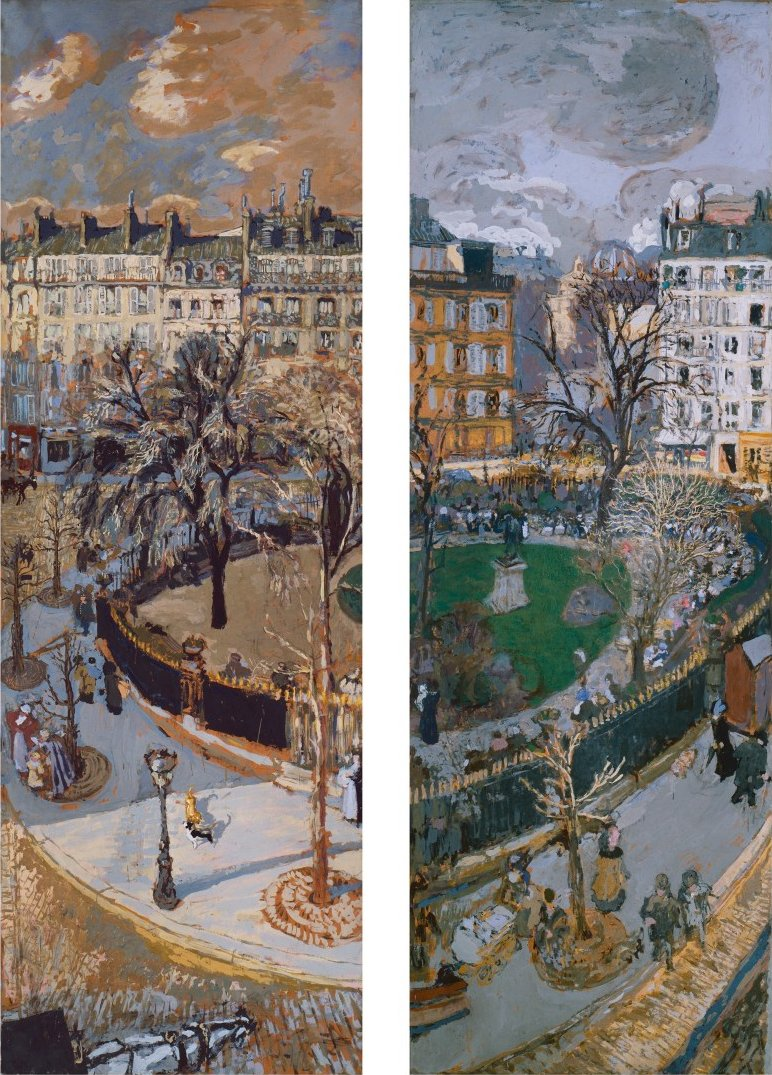
Place Vintimille panels (1908–1910)

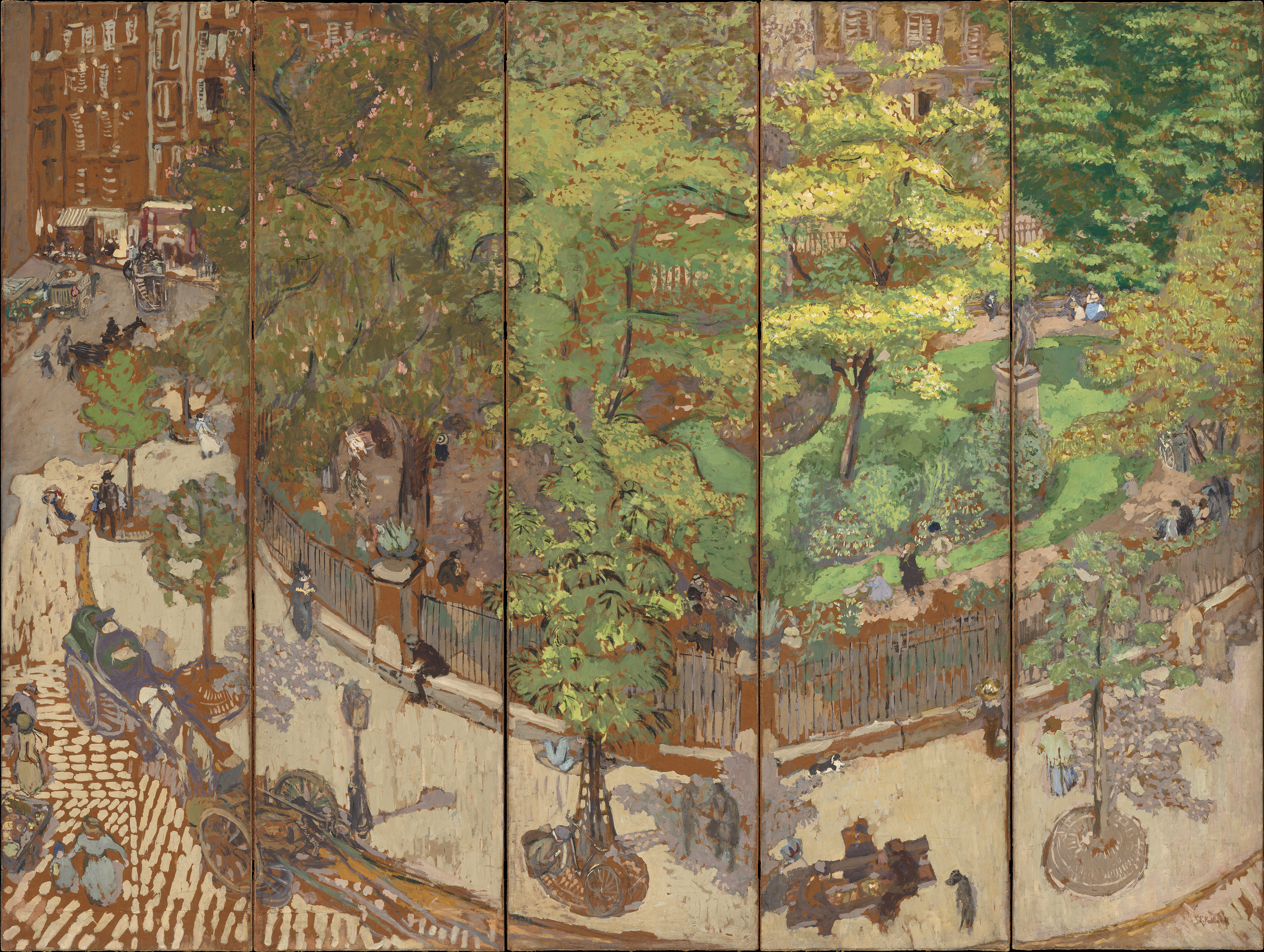
Place Vintimille panel (1915), National Gallery of Art, Washington

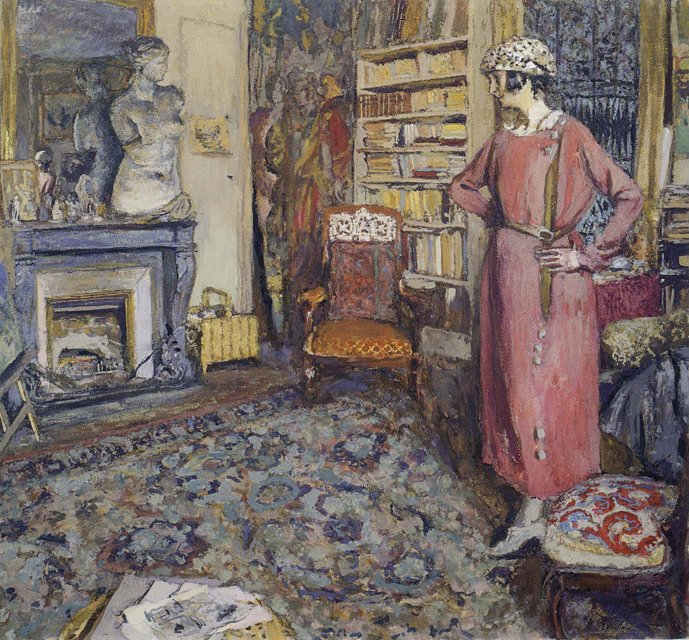
Venus de Milo (1920)

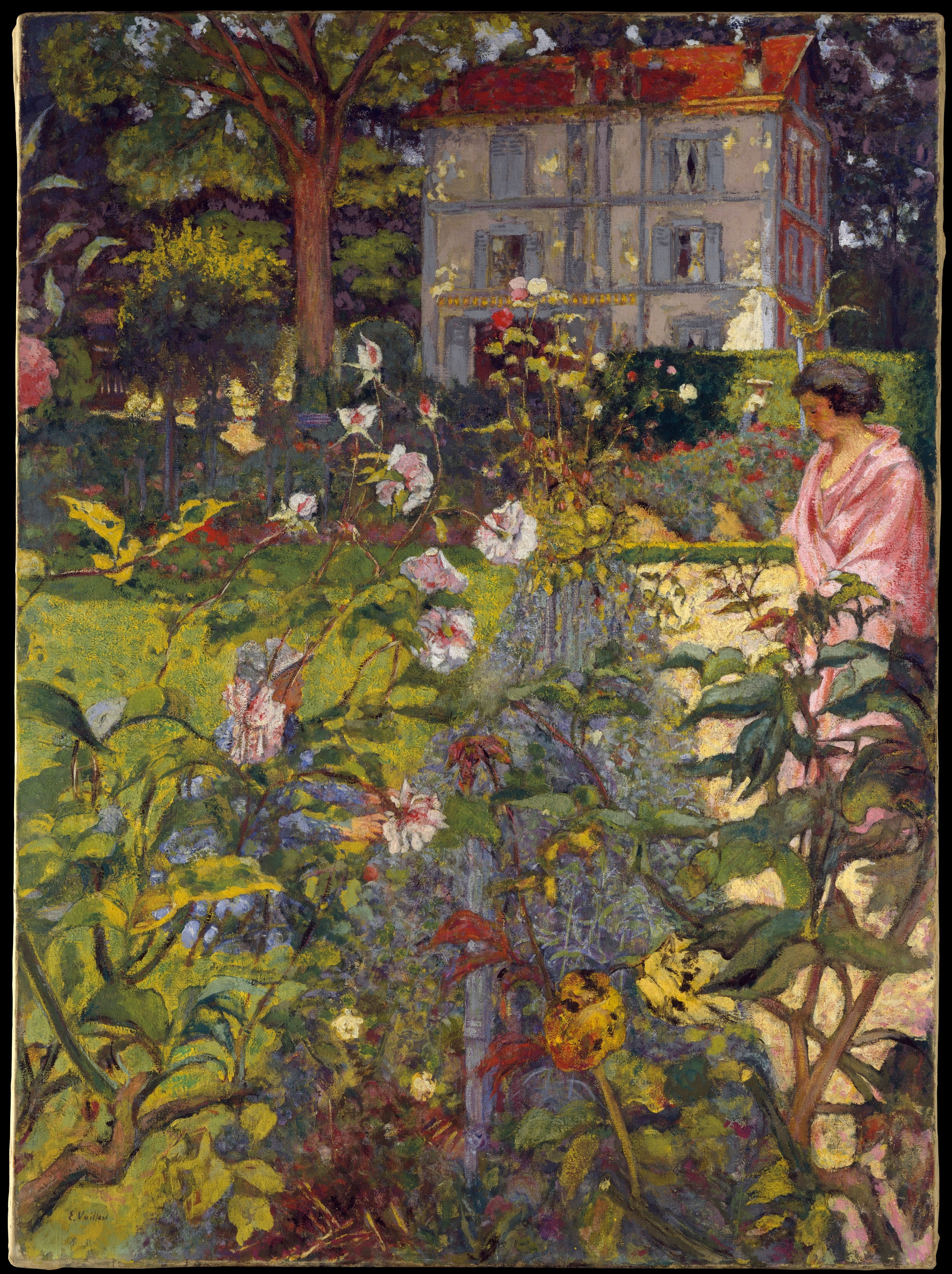
The Garden of Vaucresson (1920), Metropolitan Museum of Art, New York

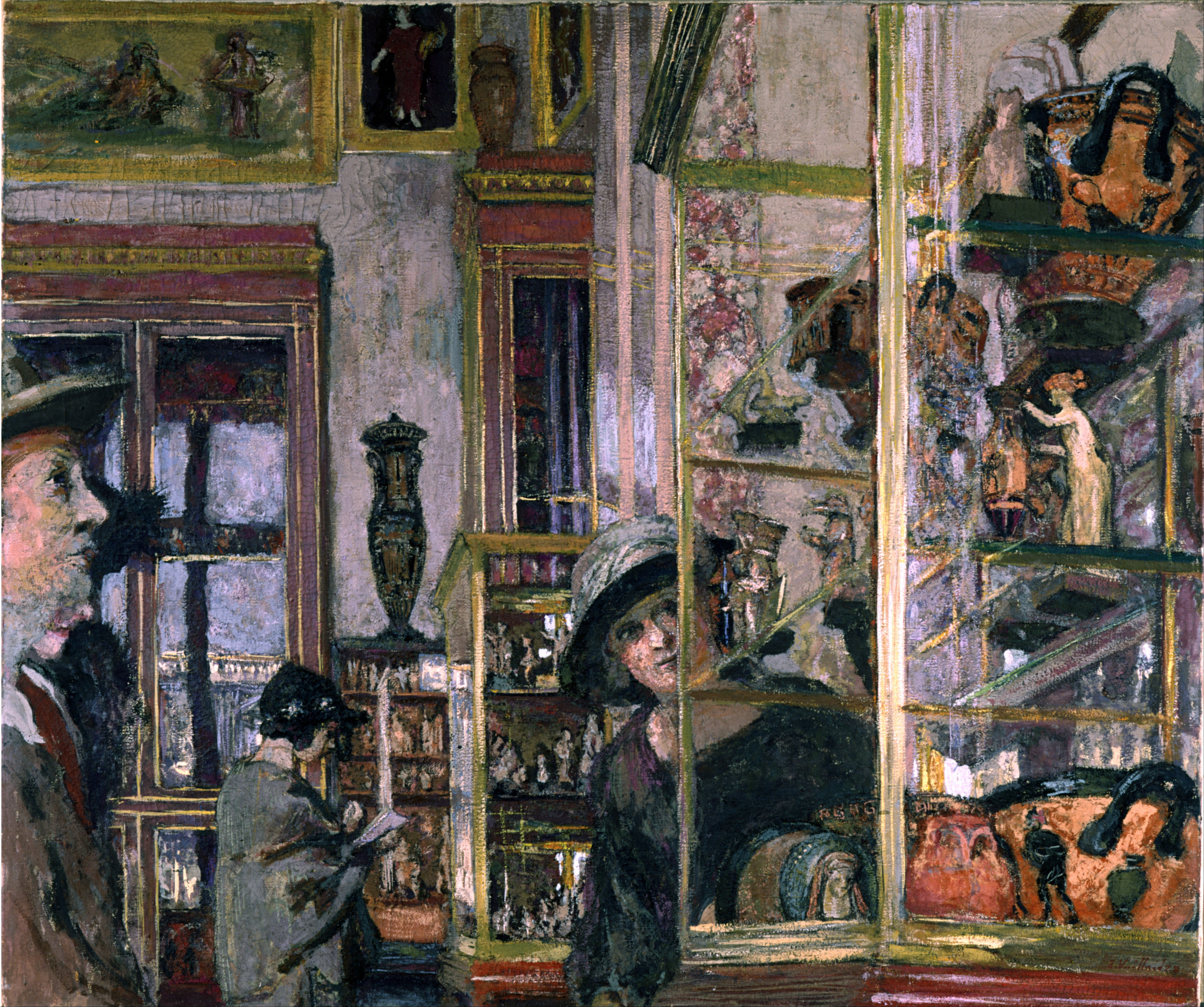
The Salle Clarac at the Louvre (1922)

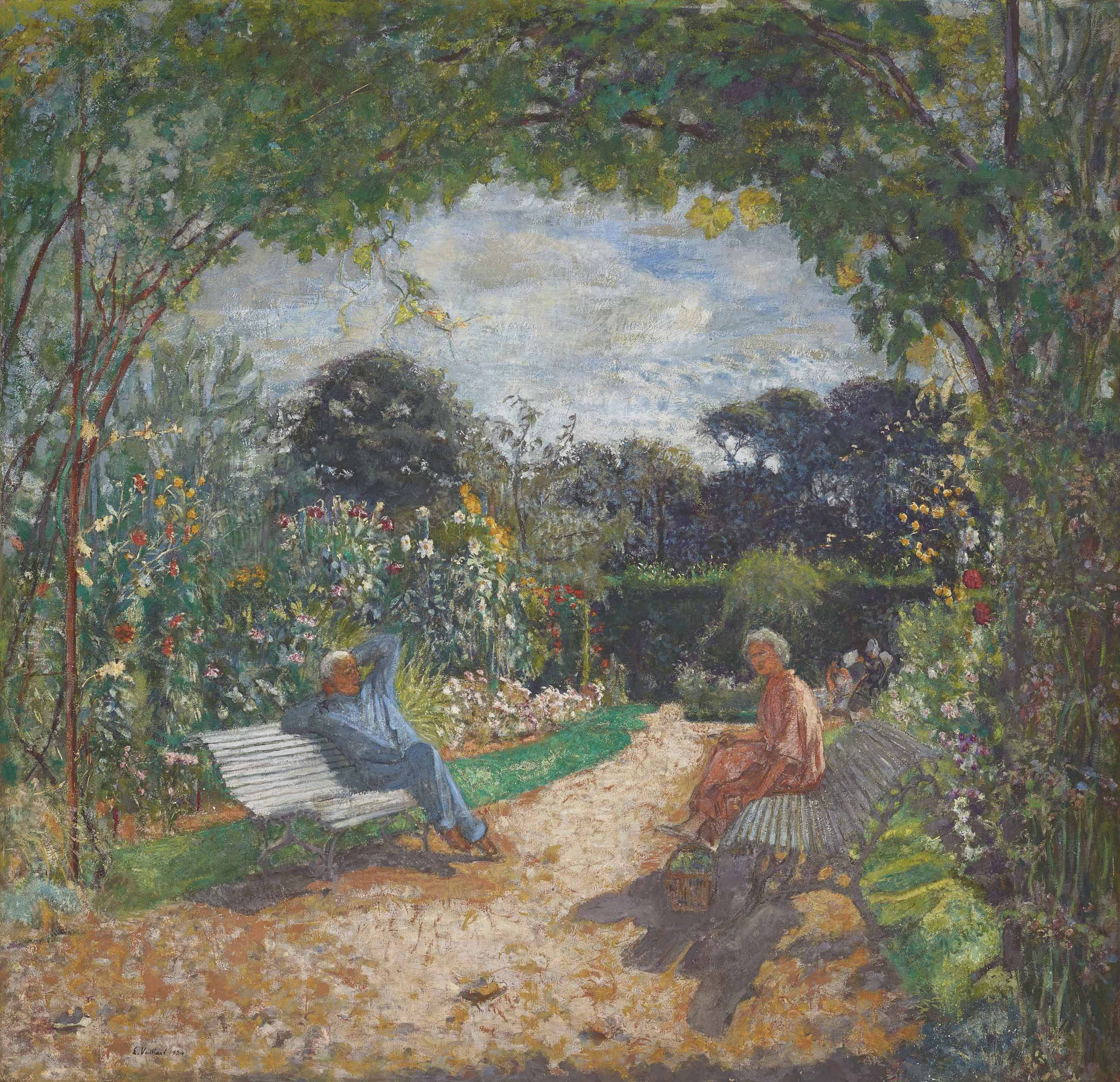
Morning in the garden, Clos Cezanne (1924)

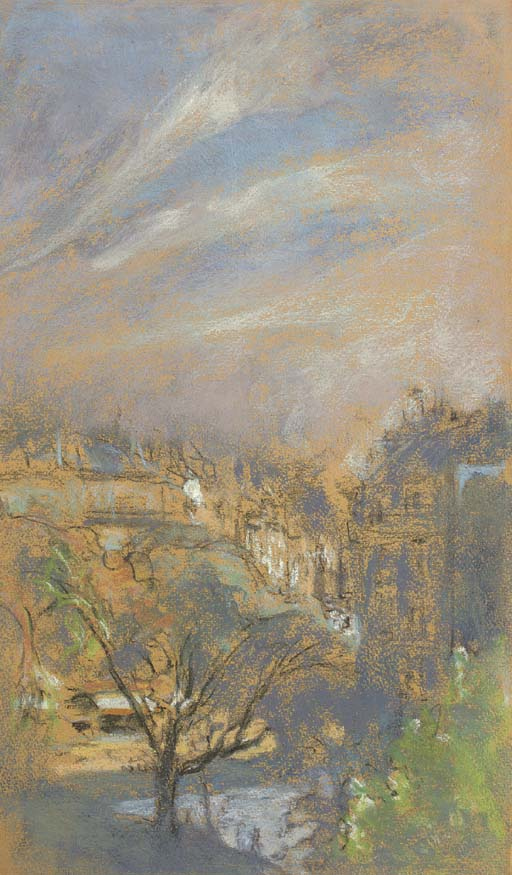
Morning Light, Place Vintimille (c. 1928), pastel and charcoal

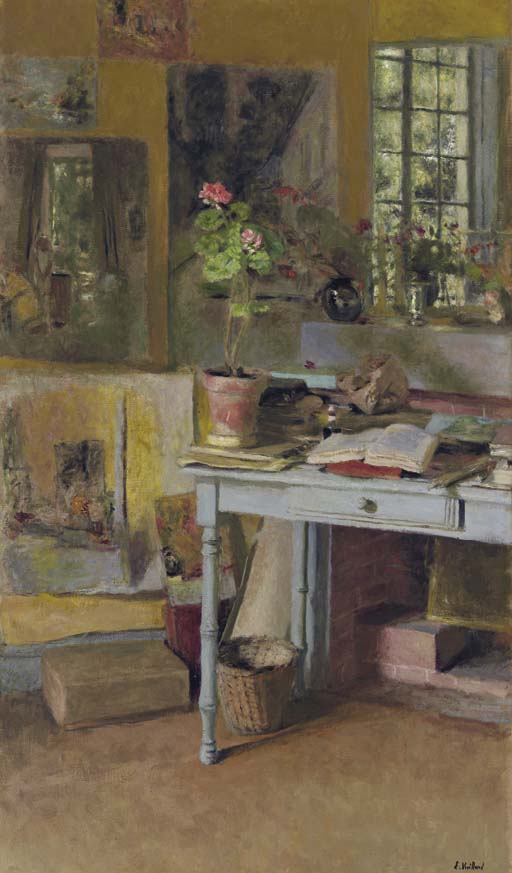
At Clayes, Geranium on a blue table (1932)

=== Theater ===
The theater was an important part of Vuillard's life. He had started his artistic career making sets and designing programs for an avant-garde theater, and throughout his life, had close contacts with the professional world of the theater. Vuillard painted his friend, the actor and director Sacha Guitry. In May 1912, Vuillard received an important commission for seven panels, and three paintings above the doorways, for the new Théâtre des Champs-Élysées in Paris, including one of Guitry in his loge at the theater, and another of the comic playwright Georges Feydeau. He attended the performances of the Ballets Russes between 1911 and 1914, and dined with the Russian director of the Ballet, Sergei Diaghilev, and with the American dancer Isadora Duncan, and frequented the Folies Bergère and the Moulin Rouge in their heyday. In 1937 he and Bonnard combined their impressions of the history of Paris theater world in a large mural, La Comédie, for the foyer of the new Théâtre national de Chaillot, built for the 1937 Paris International Exposition.

== Final years (1914–1940) ==
Following the outbreak of the First World War in August 1914, Vuillard was briefly mobilized for military duty as a highway guard. He was soon released from this duty, and returned to painting. He visited the armaments factory of his patron, Thadée Natanson, near Lyon, and later made a series of three paintings of the factories at work. He served briefly, from 2 to 22 February, as an official artist to the French armies in the region of the Vosges, making a series of pastels. These included a sympathetic sketch of a captured German prisoner being interrogated. In August 1917, back in Paris, he received a commission from the architect Francis Jourdain for a mural for a fashionable Paris café, Le Grand Teddy.

In 1921, Vuillard received an important commission for decorative panels for the art patron Camille Bauer, for his residence in Basel, Switzerland. Vuillard completed a series of four panels, plus two over-the-door paintings, which were finished by 1922. He passed his summers each year from 1917 to 1924 at Vaucresson, at a house he rented with his mother. He also made a series of landscape paintings of the area.

=== Portraits ===
After 1920, Vuillard was increasingly occupied painting portraits for wealthy and distinguished Parisians. He preferred to use the technique of peinture à la colle sur toile, or distemper technique, which allowed him to create more precise details and richer color effects. His subjects ranged from the actor and director Sacha Guitry to the fashion designer Jeanne Lanvin, Lanvin's daughter, the Contesse Marie-Blanche de Polignac, the inventor and aviation pioneer Marcel Kapferer, and the actress Jane Renouardt. He usually presented his subjects in their studios or homes or backstage, with lavishly detailed backgrounds, wallpaper, furnishings and carpets. The backgrounds both created a mood, told a story, and served as a contrast to bring out the main figure.

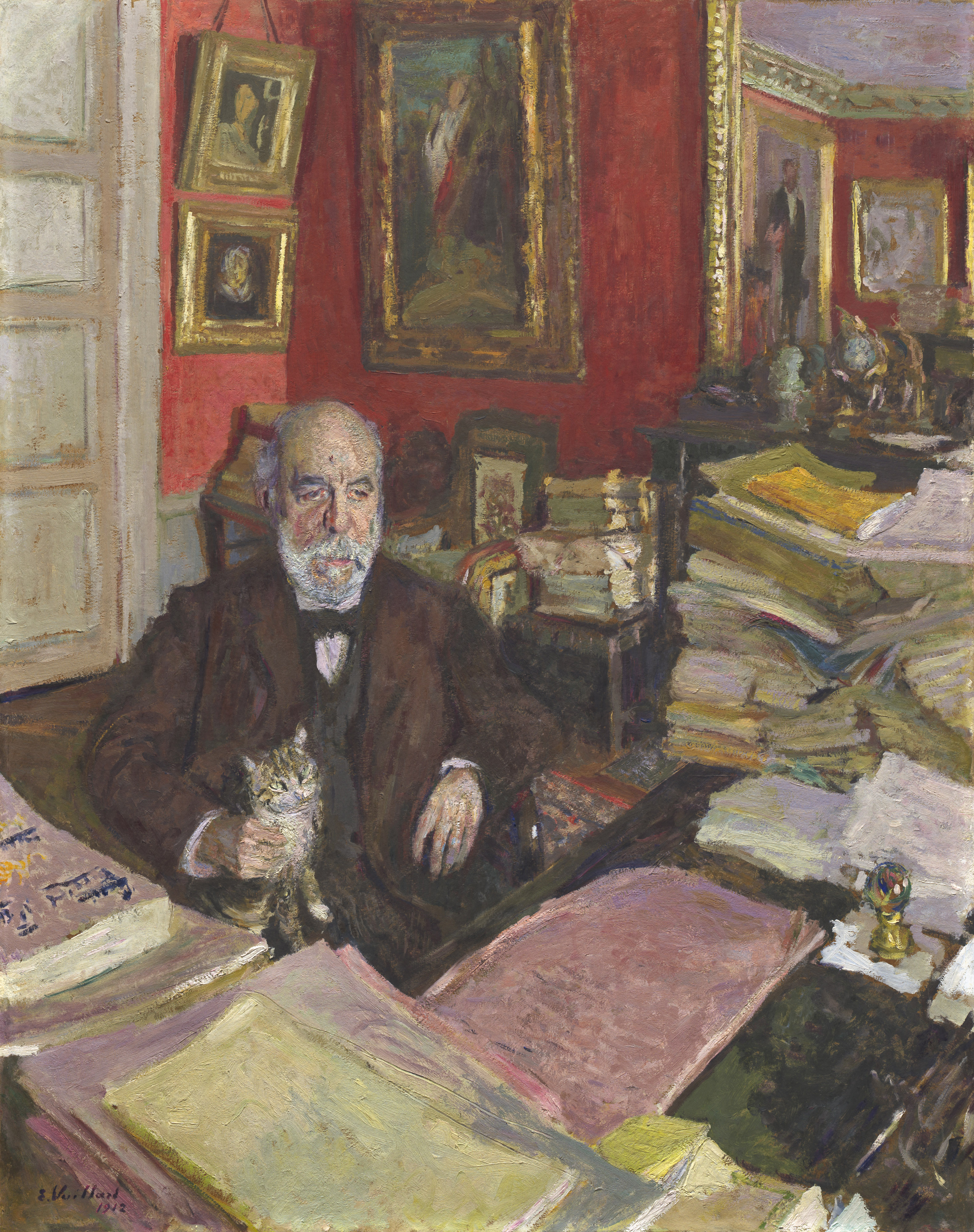
Portrait of Theodore Duret (1912), National Gallery of Art, Washington DC

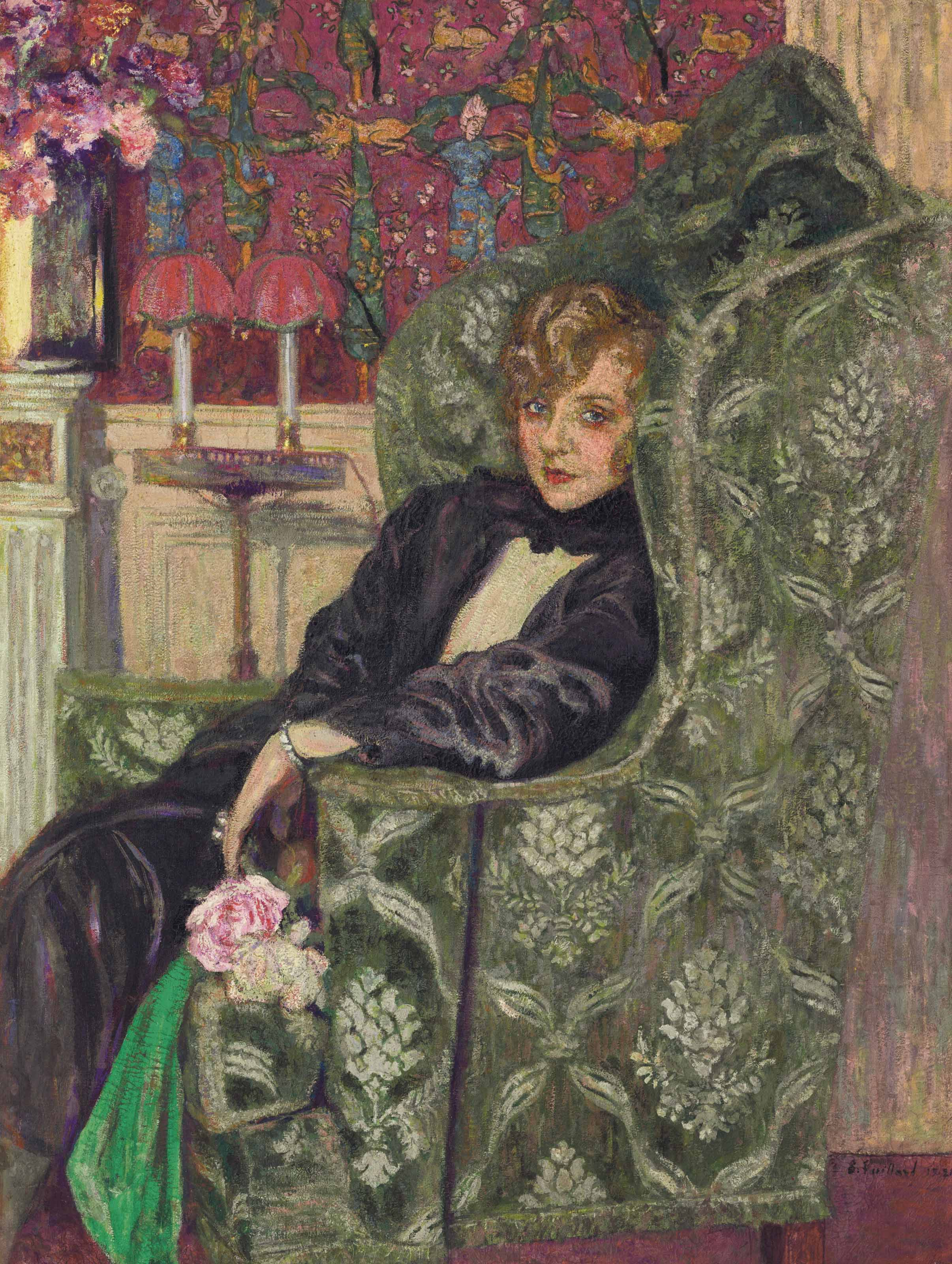
Actress Yvonne Printemps in an armchair (1920–21)

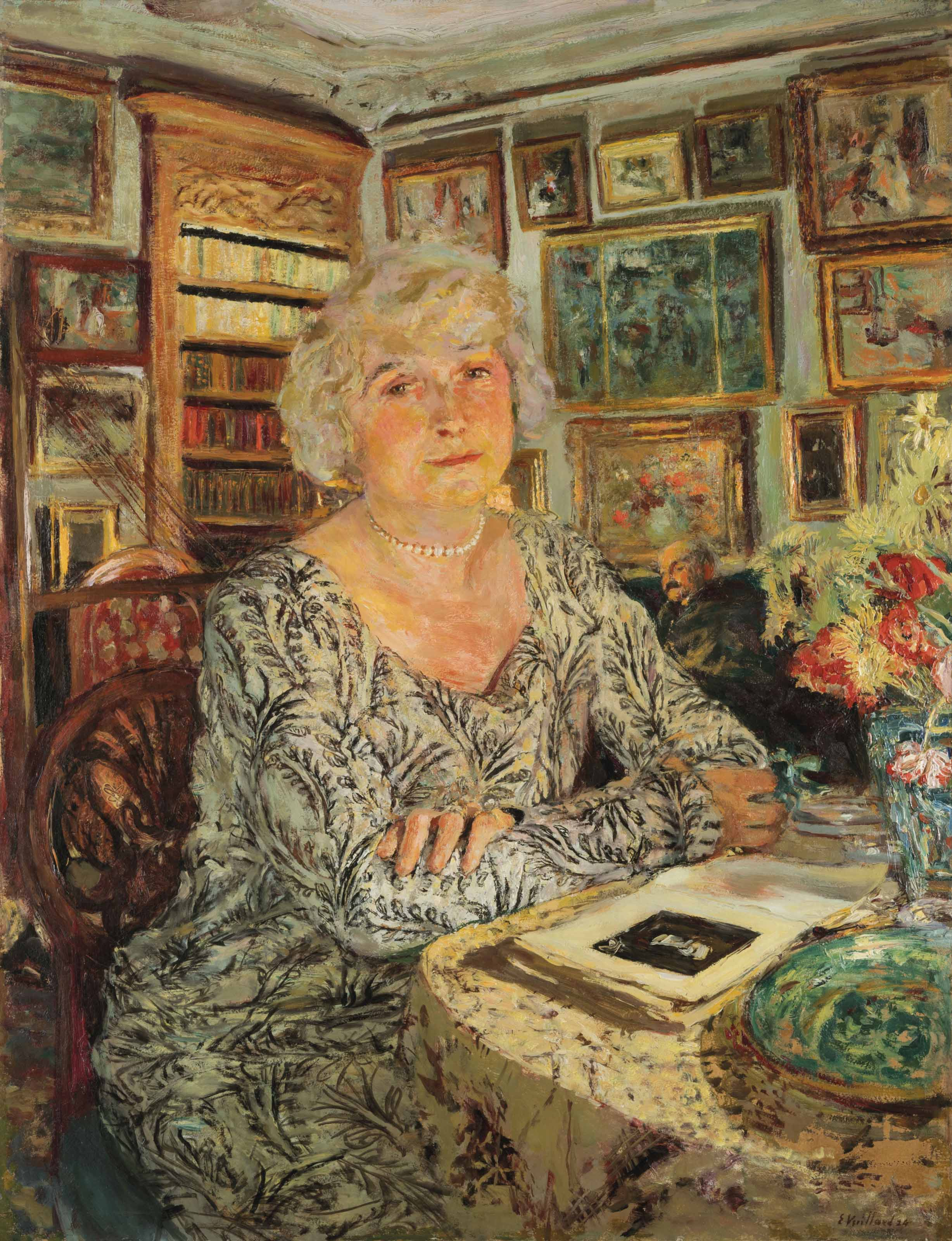
Portrait of Lucy Hessel (1924)

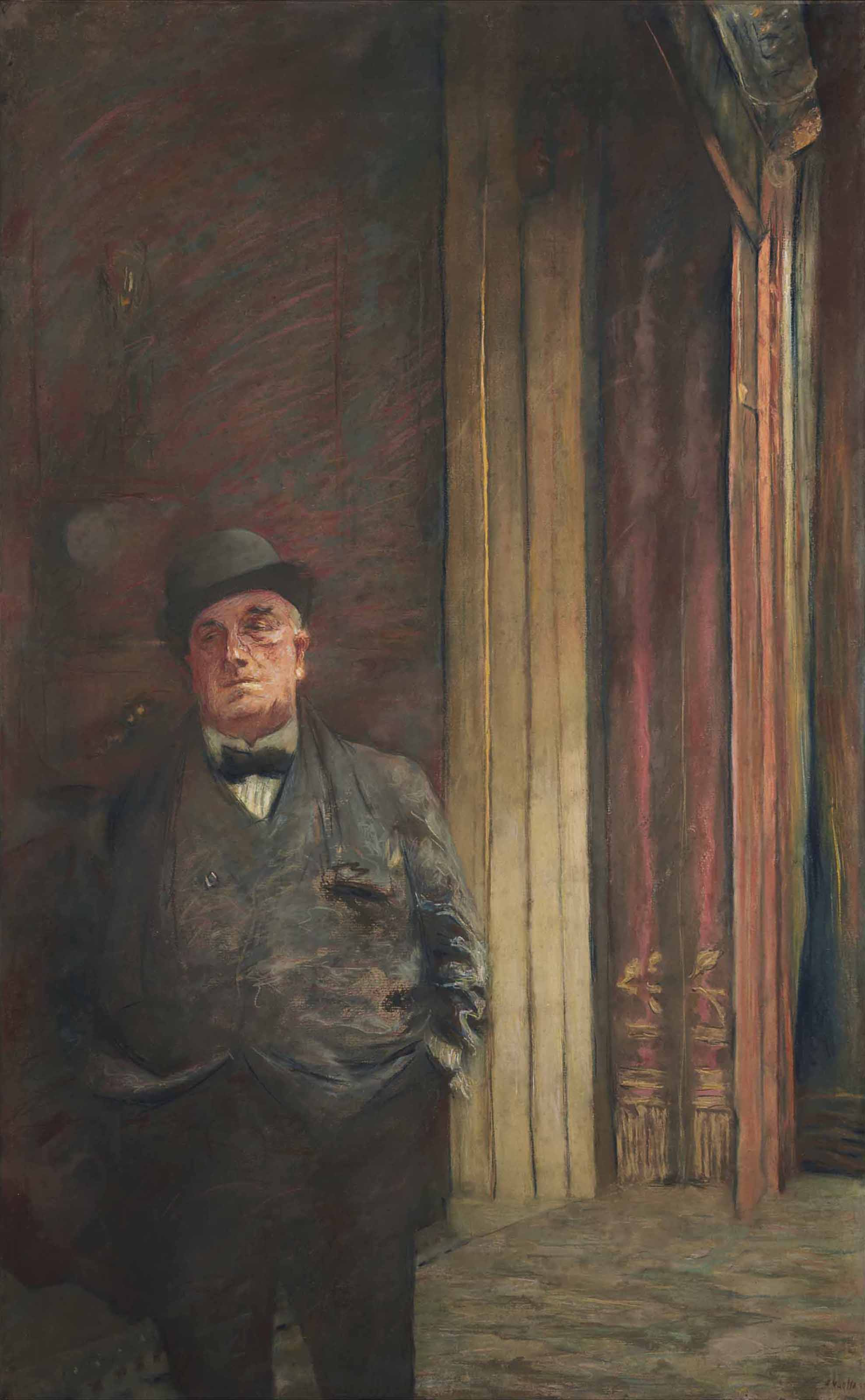
Portrait of Sacha Guitry (1925)

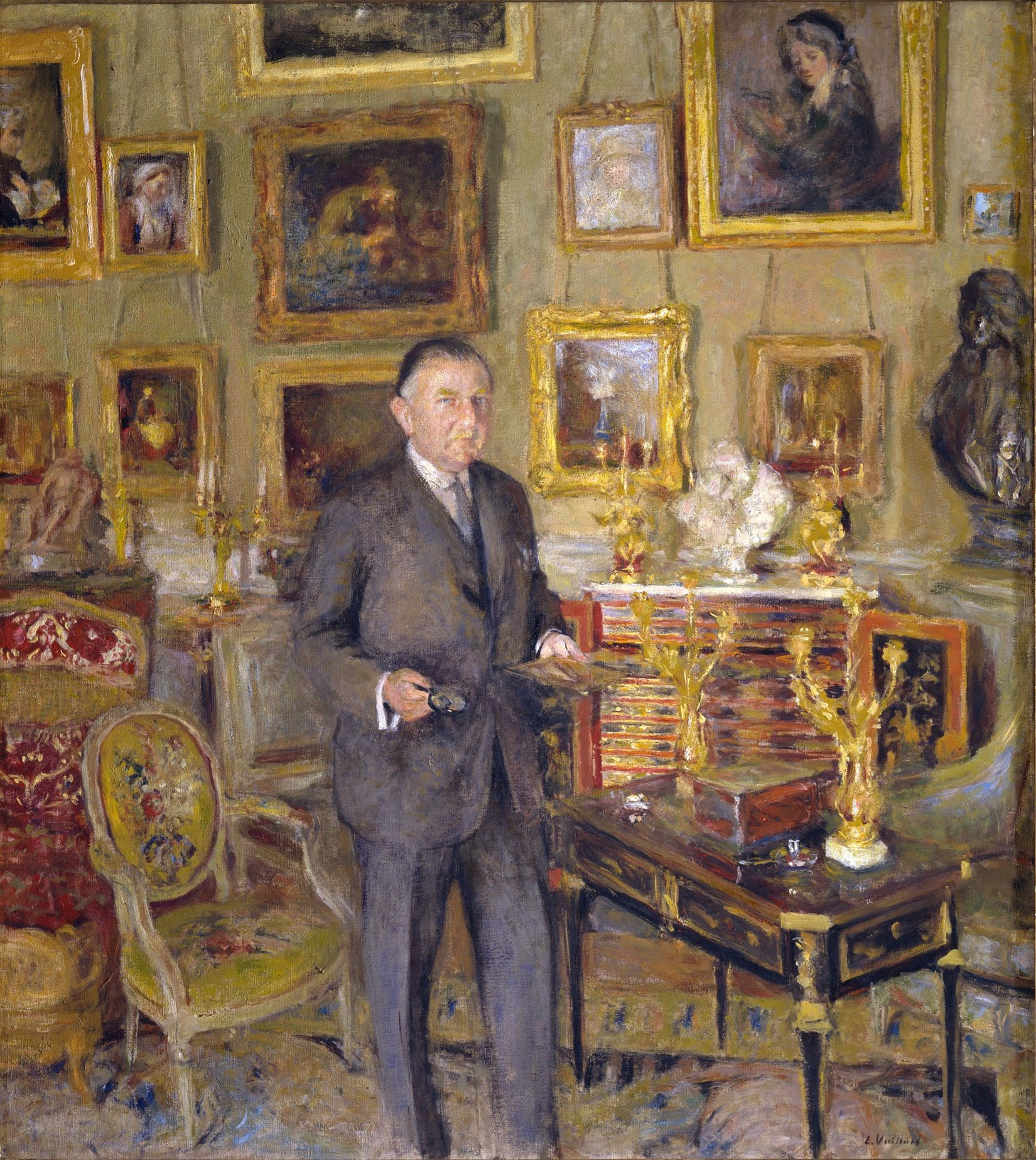
Portrait of David David-Weill (1925)

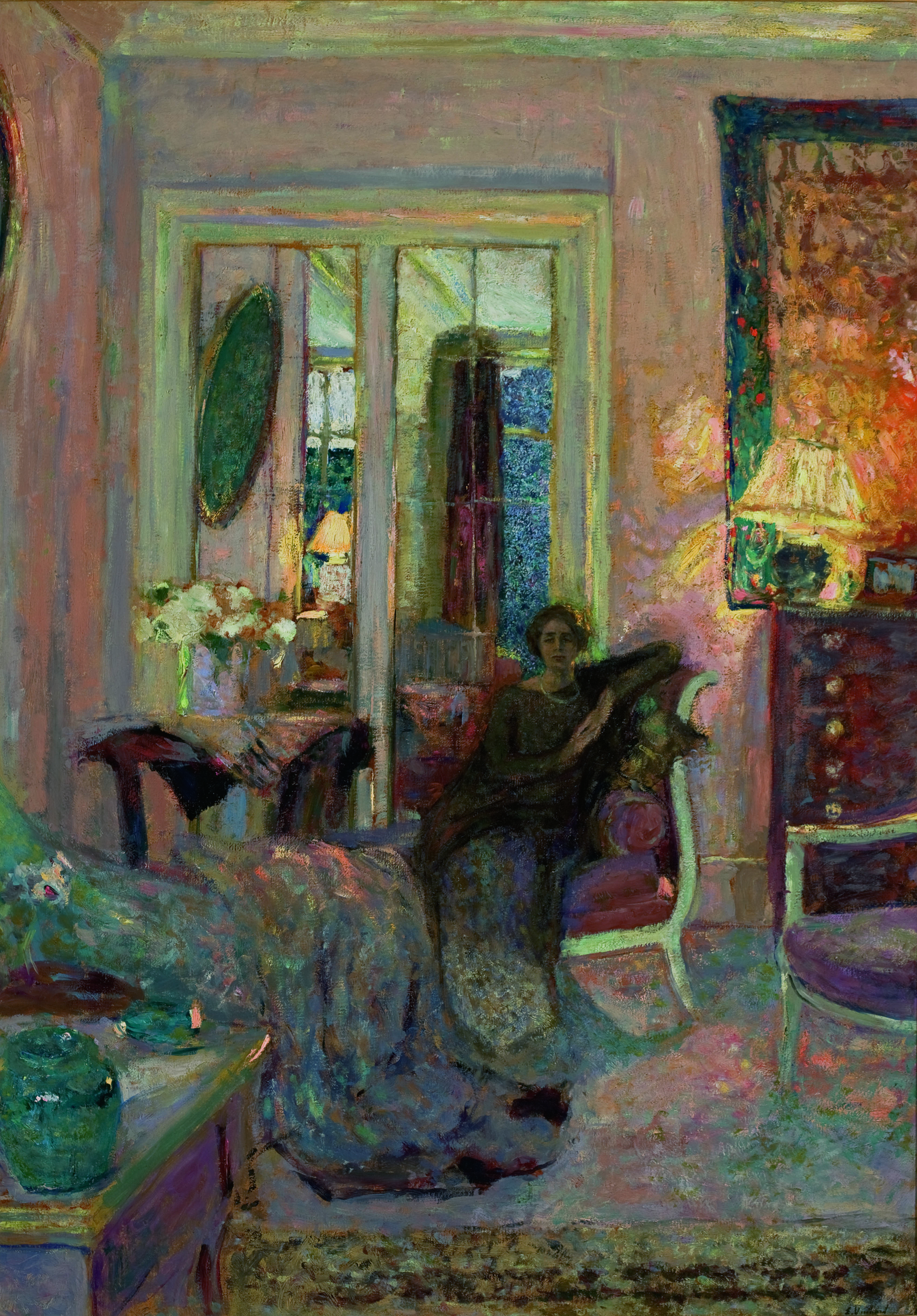
Portrait of Princess Bibesco (1925), São Paulo Museum of Art

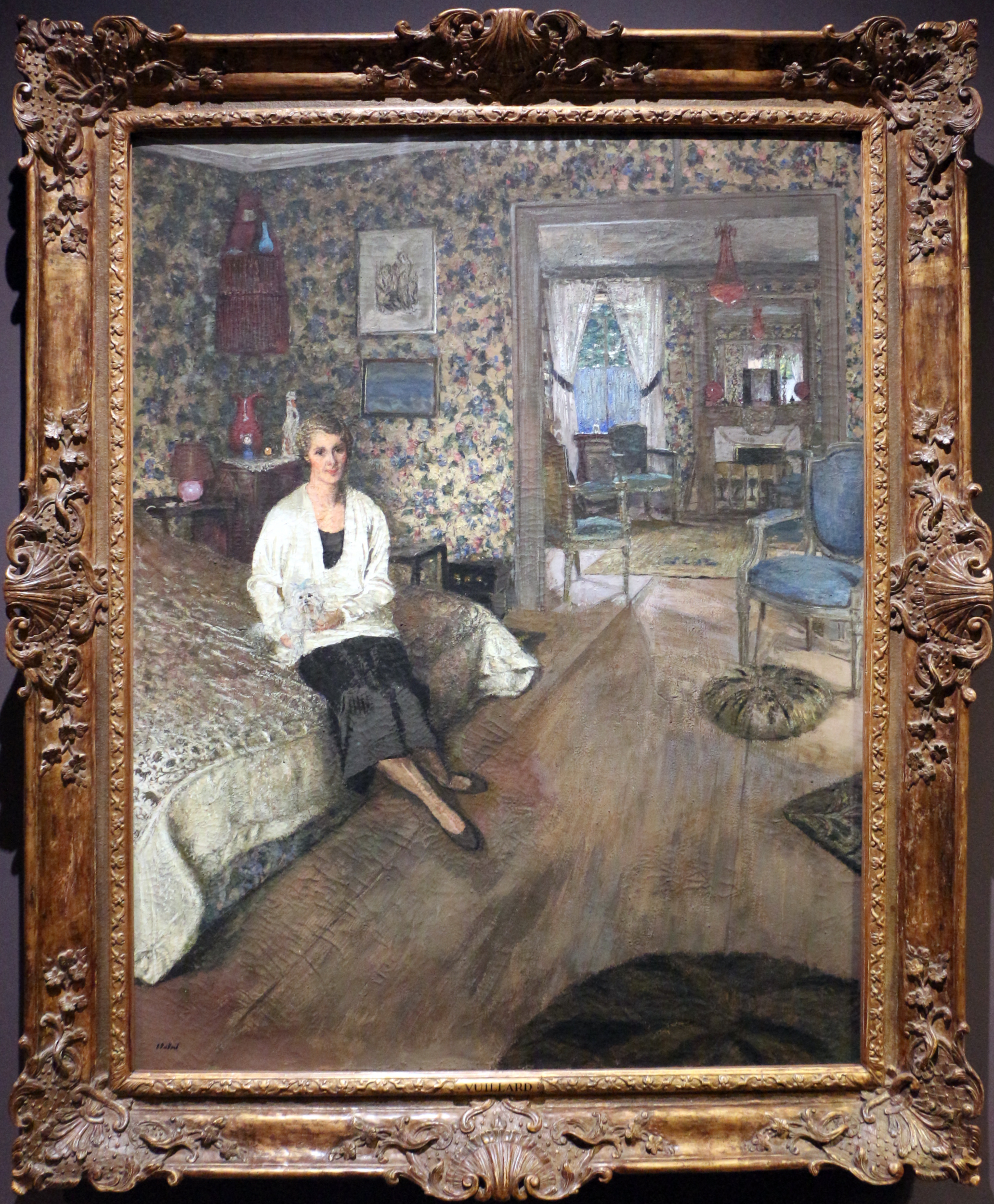
The Comtesse Marie-Blanche de Polignac (1928–1932), Musée d'Orsay, Paris

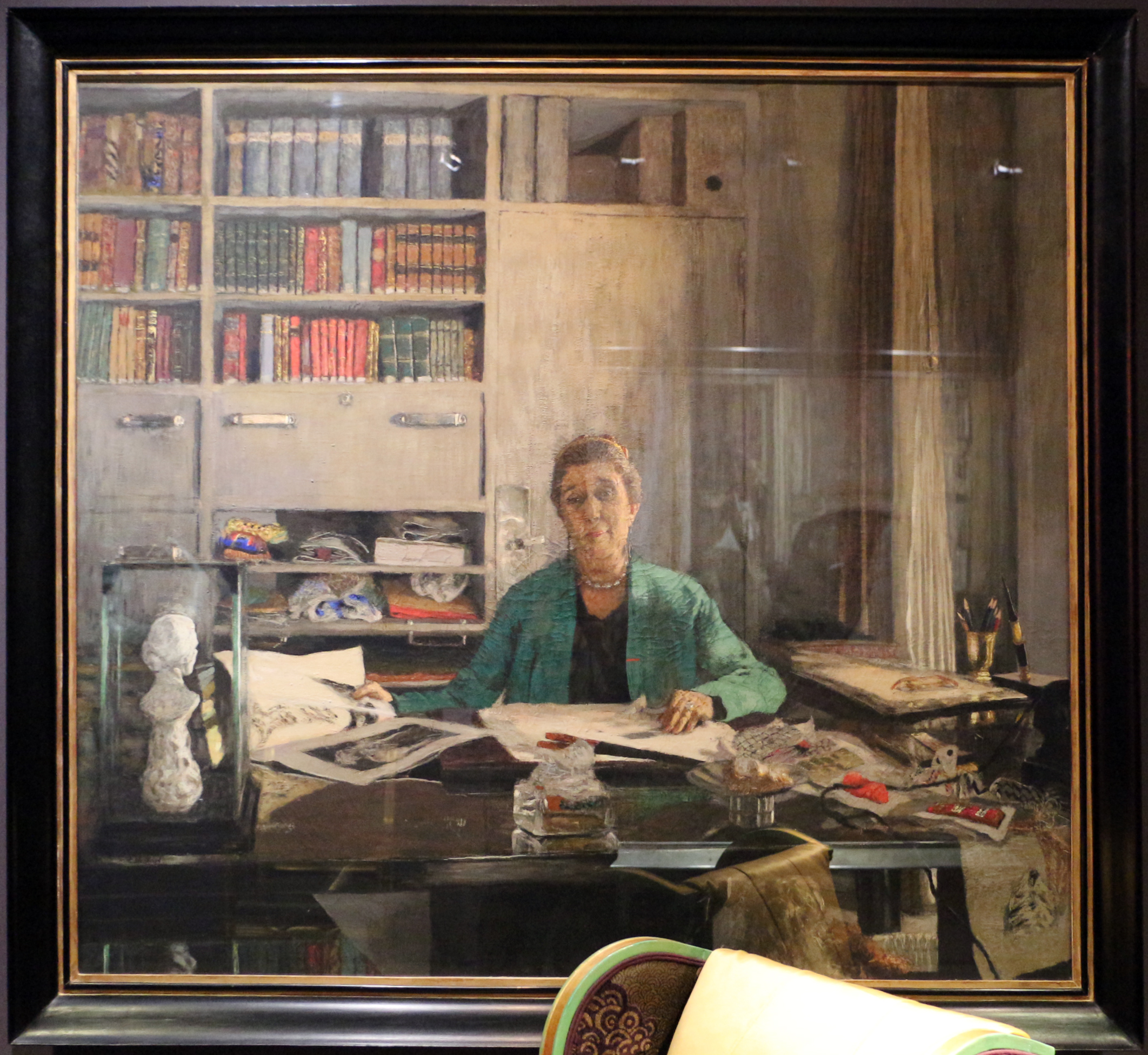
Jeanne Lanvin (1933), Musée d'Orsay

=== Recognition and death ===
Between 1930 and 1935, Vuillard divided his time between Paris and the Château de Clayes, owned by his friend Hessel. Vuillard did not receive official recognition from the French state until July 1936, when he was commissioned to make a mural, La Comédie, depicting his impressions of the history of the Paris theater world for the foyer of the new Théâtre national de Chaillot, built for the 1937 Paris International Exposition. In August of the same year, the city of Paris bought four of Vuillard's paintings, Anabaptistes, and a collection of sketches. In 1937, Vuillard received another major commission, along with Maurice Denis and Roussel, for a monumental mural at the Palace of the League of Nations in Geneva.

In 1938, Vuillard was elected to the Académie des Beaux Arts in February, and in July, the Musée des Arts Decoratifs presented a major retrospective of his paintings. Later in the year, he traveled to Geneva to oversee the installation of his mural Peace, Protector of the Arts at the League of Nations Building.

In 1940, Vuillard completed his last two portraits. He suffered from pulmonary difficulties and traveled to La Baule in Loire-Atlantique to restore his health. He died there on 21 June 1940, the same month that the French army was defeated by the Germans in the Battle of France.

== Personal life ==
Vuillard was unmarried, but his personal life and his work were greatly influenced by his women friends. In the late 1890s he began a long relationship with Misia Natanson, the wife of his important patron, Thadée Natanson. Natanson had married her in April 1893, when she was sixteen years old. She appears in the Public Gardens. He helped her decorate the Natansons' apartment, painted her often in his decorative panels, and regularly accompanied her and her husband to their country house.

In 1900, Vuillard met Lucy Hessel, wife of a Swiss art dealer, who became his new muse, traveling with him each year to Normandy in July, August and September, and giving him advice. She remained with him, despite many rivals and many dramatic scenes, until the end of his life. In addition to Misia and Lucy, he also had a long relationship with the actress Lucie Belin, for whom he arranged a pension when she fell ill in the 1920s.

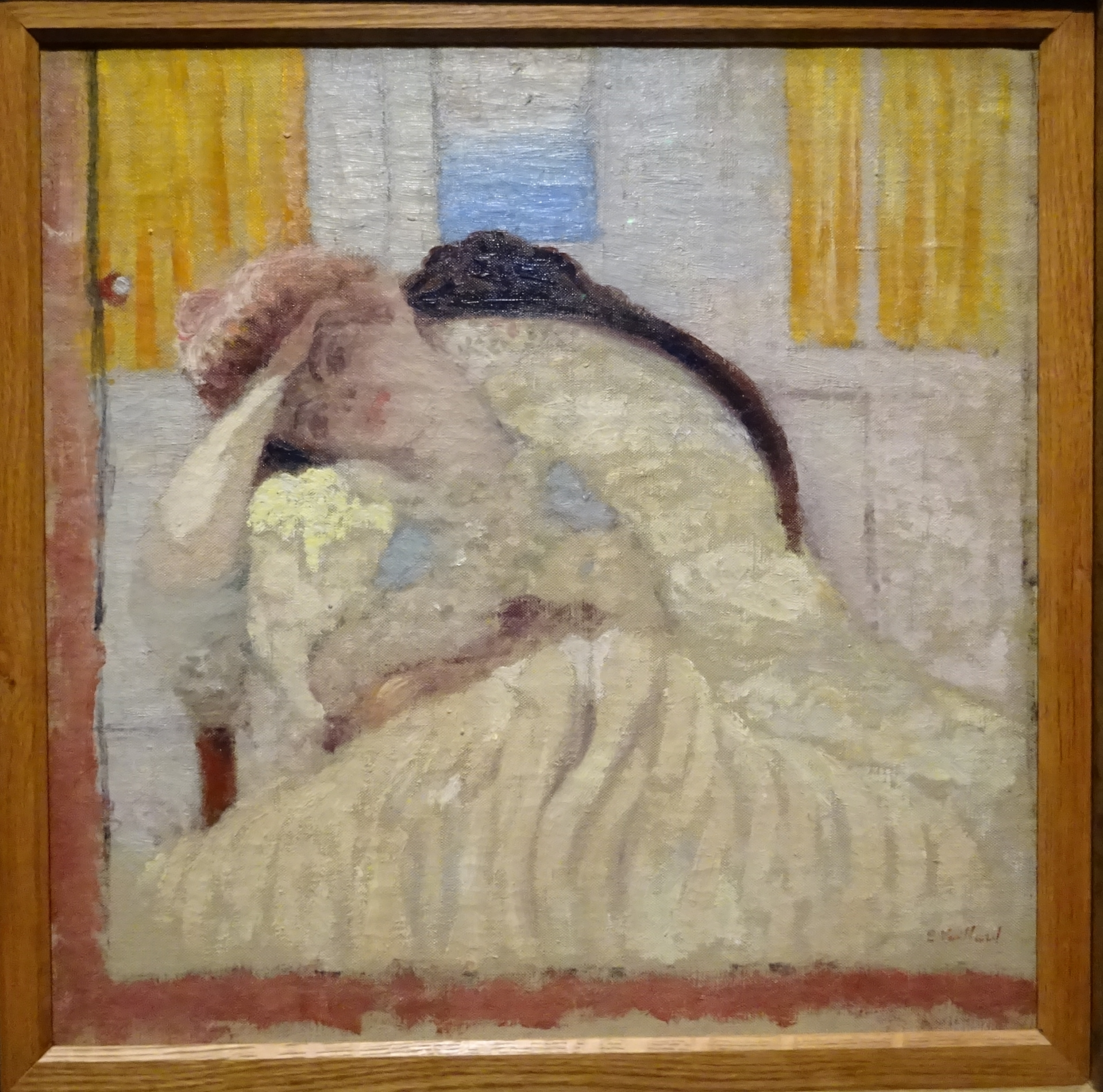
Misia Natanson seated in an armchair (1901)

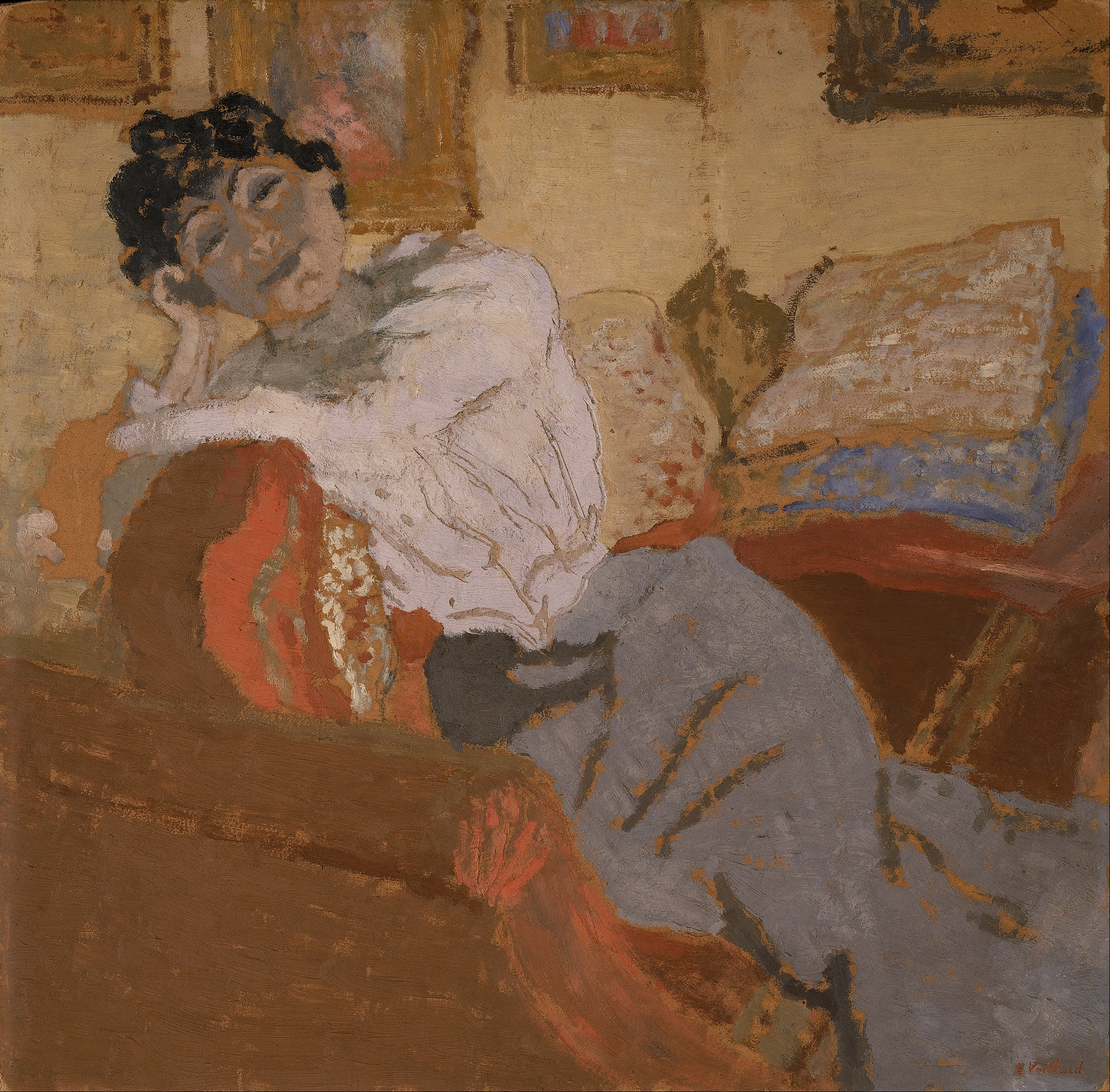
Lucy Hessel on a sofa (1900)

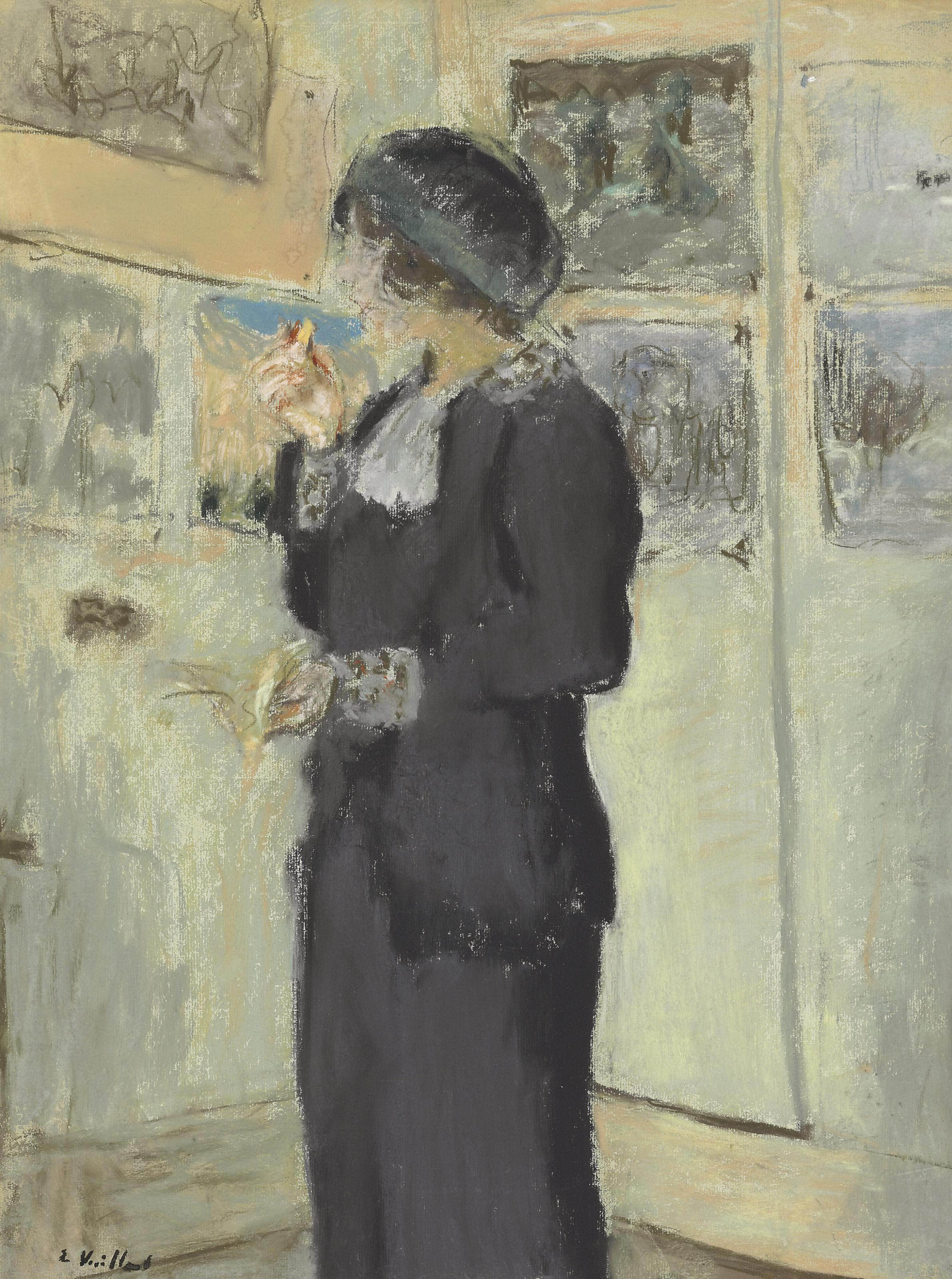
Lucie Belin (1915)

== "Le Grand Teddy" painting rediscovery ==
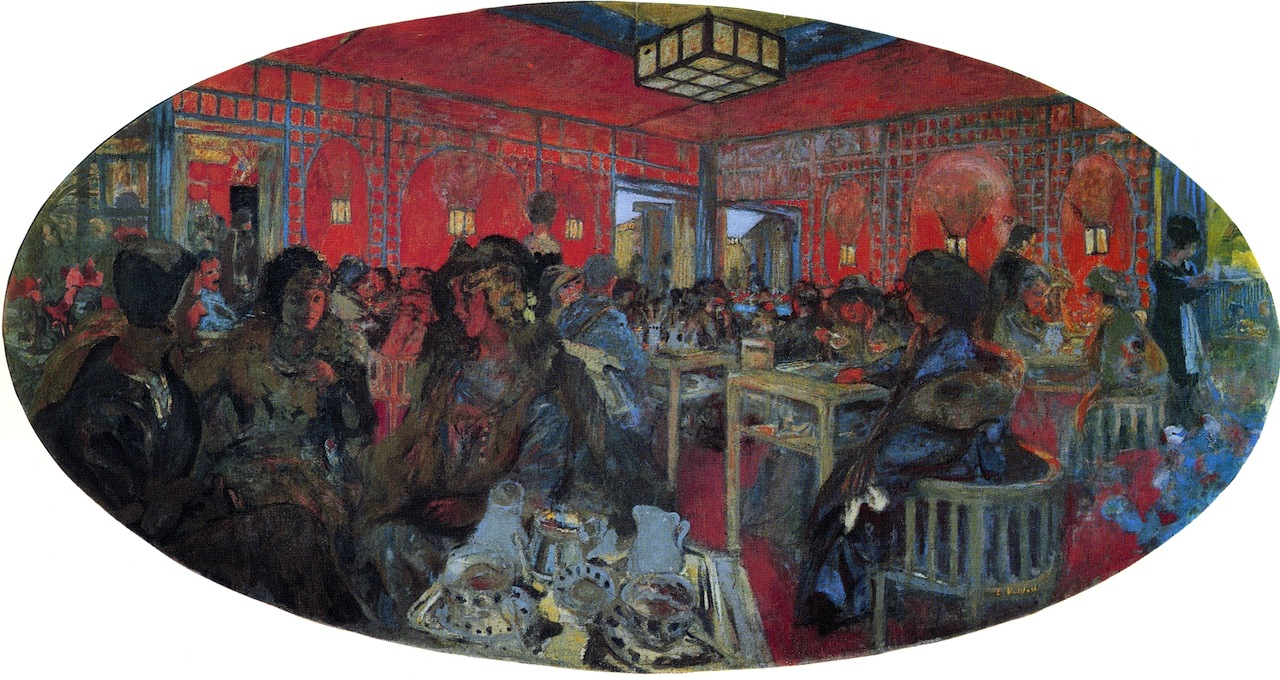
Le Grand Teddy, 1918, glue distemper on canvas, 150 × 290 cm, the largest of the three paintings commissioned from Vuillard in 1918 for the Paris café "Le Grand Teddy"

In 2014, the BBC television program Fake or Fortune? investigated a painting owned by British scriptwriter Keith Tutt, which both he and the previous owners, Mr. and Mrs. Warren, believed to be by Vuillard. The oval painting, which depicts a café scene, was thought to be one of a group of three paintings commissioned from Vuillard in 1918 to decorate a new Parisian café, "Le Grand Teddy", named after American president Teddy Roosevelt. The main painting of the commission, a large horizontal oval work depicting a busy café interior (currently privately owned and kept in secure storage in Geneva, Switzerland) was at the time the only one of the three known to still exist and to have been fully confirmed as a genuine Vuillard. With assistance from art experts, the program undertook an exhaustive investigation and analysis of the Tutt painting, as well as carrying out extensive research to establish the painting's provenance. After submitting all the evidence to a committee at the secretive and highly conservative Wildenstein Institute in Paris, Tutt and the Fake or Fortune? team learned that the committee had unanimously agreed it was genuine.

== Market ==
On 13 November 2017, Misia et Vallotton à Villeneuve painted in 1899 became the most valuable Vuillard sold at auction when it achieved $17.75 million at Christie's. The painting had been owned by Nancy Lee and Perry Bass since 1979 when they bought the painting from Wildenstein & Co., the French art dealing family.

== Nazi-looted art ==
In 2006, the National Gallery of Canada restituted Vuillard's The Salon of Madame Aron (1904, reworked in 1934), which it had purchased in 1956, to the Lindon family in France.

== Selected exhibitions ==
- 3 March to 25 April 2026 – Édouard Vuillard: Early Interiors, Skarstedt Gallery, Chelsea, New York
- 1 July 2021 to 19 September 2021 – Private Lives: Home and Family in the Art of the Nabis, Paris 1889-1900, organized by the Cleveland Museum of Art, Cleveland, Ohio and the Portland Art Museum, Portland, Oregon (exhibited 23 October 2021 – 23 January 2022)
- 10 February 2021 to 30 May 2021 – Édouard Vuillard: Sketches and Studies Morgan Library & Museum, New York, New York
- 13 March 2019 to 30 June 2019 – Les Nabis et le décor – Bonnard, Vuillard, Maurice Denis... Musée du Luxembourg, Paris
- 19 October 2018 – 20 January 2019 Maman Vuillard and Madame Vuillard, Barber Institute of Fine Arts in Birmingham
- 1-5 March 2017, Under the Influence: Édouard Vuillard and Contemporary Art, Jill Newhouse Gallery in New York at The Art Show, Park Avenue Armory
- 16 October 2015 – 15 February 2016 Indoor/Outdoor: Vuillard's "Landscapes and Interiors", Norton Simon Museum in Pasadena
- 4 May 2012 – 23 September 2012 Edouard Vuillard: A Painter and His Muses, 1890–1940 , The Jewish Museum in New York
- 11 April - 21 May 2012, Edouard Vuillard: Portraits Reconsidered, Jill Newhouse Gallery in New York
- 19 January 2003 – 20 April 2003 Édouard Vuillard, National Gallery of Art in Washington, DC, exhibit organized by the National Gallery of Art, Washington, the Montreal Museum of Fine Arts (exhibited 15 May–24 August 2003), the Réunion des musées nationaux/Musée d'Orsay, Paris (exhibited Galeries nationales du Grand Palais, Paris 23 September, 2003–4 January, 2004), and the Royal Academy of Arts, London (exhibited 31 January–18 April 2004)

== Selected works ==
- The Green Interior or Figure in front of a Window with Drawn Curtains (1891), Metropolitan Museum of Art
- Self Portrait (1892)
- Woman Sweeping (1892)
- Mother and Sister of the Artist (1893)
- The Seamstress (1893), Indianapolis Museum of Art
- The Yellow Curtain (1893)
- Married Life (1894)
- Under the Trees (from "The Public Gardens") (1894), Cleveland Museum of Art
- Chestnut Trees, a Cartoon for a Tiffany Stained-Glass Window (1894–95), glue-based distemper on cardboard, mounted on canvas, 110 x 70 cm, Dallas Museum of Art
- At the Café (c.1897–1899), Cleveland Museum of Art
- Portrait of Toulouse Lautrec, in Villeneuve-sur-Yonne, with the Natansons (1898)
- Woman in Blue With Child (Misia Natanson with Mimi Godebska, rue Saint-Florentin) (1899)
- Interior: Madame Vuillard and Grand-Mère Roussel at L'Étang-la-Ville (1900–01), oil on cardboard, 53 x 70 cm, Dallas Museum of Art
- At the Revue Blanche (Portrait of Félix Fénéon), 1901, Guggenheim Museum
- Le Déjeuner à Villeneuve-sur-Yonne (1902)
- Café Wepler (1908–10, reworked in 1912), Cleveland Museum of Art
- Le Grand Teddy (1918)
- Garden at Vaucresson (1920, reworked in 1926, 1935, 1936), Metropolitan Museum of Art
- André Bénac (1936), Cleveland Museum of Art

== Selected Collections ==
Vuillard's work is in the following collections:

- Art Institute of Chicago
- Metropolitan Museum of Art
- Museum of Fine Arts, Boston
- Museum of Modern Art
- National Gallery of Art

== See also ==
- Intimism (art movement)
- Post-Impressionism

== Books cited in text ==
- Preston, Stuart (1972). Édouard Vuillard. New York: Abrams. OCLC 871630733.
- Thompson, Belinda (1988). Vuillard. Oxford: Phaidon Press. ISBN 978-0-7148-2955-5.
- Cogeval, Guy (2003). Vuillard (in French). Montreal: Musée des Beax-Arts, Montreal, and National Gallery of Art, Washington, D.C. ISBN 2-7118-4640-7.
- Vuillard, Édouard (2019). Édouard Vuillard- Paroles d'Artiste (in French). Èditions Fage. ISBN 978-2-84975-560-0.
- Brown, Stephen (2012). Édouard Vuillard: A Painter and His Muses, 1890–1940. New York, New Haven and London: Jewish Museum and Yale University Press. ISBN 9780300176759.
