= Louis-Marie =

Louis-Marie may refer to:

- Louis Marie Baptiste Atthalin (1784–1856), French Army officer, politician, painter, watercolorist, and lithographer
- Louis-Marie-Augustin d'Aumont, 4th Duke of Aumont of the Aumont family, a French noble house
- Louis-Marie Autissier (1772–1830), French-born Belgian portrait miniature painter
- Louis-Marie Baader (1828–1920), French painter of German descent
- Louis-Marie-Edmond Blanquart de Bailleul (1795–1868), French Roman Catholic bishop
- Louis-Marie-Raphaël Barbier (1792–1852), physician and surgeon from Berthier-en-Haut in Lower Canada
- Louis-Marie Baudouin (1765–1835), French Roman Catholic priest, founder of the Sons of Mary Immaculate and the Ursulines of Jesus
- Louis-Marie-Joseph Beaumont (1753–1828), farmer and political figure in Lower Canada
- Louis-Marie Billé (1938–2002), French clergyman, archbishop of Lyon, cardinal until his death in office
- Louis-Marie de Blignières (born 1949), French traditionalist Catholic priest, founder of the Fraternity of Saint Vincent Ferrer
- Louis Marie-Auguste Boutan (1859–1934), French biologist and photographer
- Louis Marie Joseph de Brigode (1776–1827), French politician under the First French Empire and the Bourbon Restoration
- Louis Marie Joseph Caffarelli (1760–1845), French sailor, soldier and politician, Conseiller d'État and maritime prefect of Brest
- Louis-Marie de Castelbajac, French designer and entrepreneur
- Louis-Marie Hilaire Bernigaud de Chardonnet (1839–1924), French engineer and industrialist, inventor of artificial silk
- Louis Marie Florent du Châtelet (1727–1793), aristocratic French Army general and diplomat of the Ancien Régime
- Louis Marie Cordonnier (1854–1940), French architect associated principally with Lille and the French Flanders region
- Louis Marie de la Haye, Vicomte de Cormenin (1788–1868), French jurist and political pamphleteer
- Louis Marie Pantaleon Costa, Marquis de Beau-Regard (1806–1864), French statesman, archaeologist, historian and ornithologist
- Louis Marie Anne Couperus (1863–1923), Dutch novelist and poet
- Louis Marie Bernard Dangeard (1898–1987), French geologist and oceanographer
- Louis Marie Alphonse Depuiset (1822–1886), French entomologist who specialised in Lepidoptera
- Louis-Marie Désiré-Lucas (1869–1949), French painter
- Louis Marie Olivier Duchesne (1843–1922), French priest, philologist, teacher and a critical historian
- Louis Marie Raymond Durand (1786–1837), French diplomat, consul in Warsaw during the November Uprising
- Louis-Marie-Joseph Maximilian Caffarelli du Falga (1756–1799), French commander and scholar
- Louis Marie Fontan (1801–1839), a French man of letters
- Louis-Marie Stanislas Fréron (1754–1802), French politician, journalist, representative to the National Assembly
- Louis Marie de Lescure, marquis de Lescure (1766–1793), French soldier and opponent of the French Revolution
- Louis-Marie Ling Mangkhanekhoun I.V.D. (born 1944), Laotian prelate of the Roman Catholic Church
- Louis-Marie Michon (1802–1866), French surgeon
- Louis-Marie-François Tardy de Montravel (1811–1864), French admiral, explorer and colonial administrator
- Louis Marie de Milet de Mureau (1756–1825), French politician
- Louis Marie Jacques Amalric, Comte de Narbonne-Lara (1755–1813), French nobleman, soldier and diplomat
- Louis Marie Antoine, vicomte de Noailles (1756–1804), member of the famous Noailles family of the French aristocracy
- Louis-Marie Aubert du Petit-Thouars (1758–1831), French botanist studying orchids from Madagascar, Mauritius and Réunion
- Louis-Marie Pilet (1815–1877), 19th-century French cellist
- Louis Marie Alexis Pothuau (1815–1882), French naval officer and politician
- Louis-Marie Pouka, Cameroonian poet who advocated the assimilation of Cameroonian peoples into French culture
- Louis-Marie Prudhomme, (1752–1830), French journalist and historian
- Louis Marie Quicherat (1799–1884), French Latinist best known for his Latin Dictionary
- Louis Marie, Duke of Rambouillet (1746–1749), French prince who died before his fourth birthday
- Louis-Marie Régis CC OP MSRC (1903–1988), Canadian philosopher, medievalist, and Dominican priest
- Louis Marie de La Révellière-Lépeaux (1753–1824), deputy to the National Convention during the French Revolution
- Louis Marie Charles Hurault de Sorbée (born 1786), French soldier
- Louis Marie Turreau (1756–1816), French general officer of the French Revolutionary Wars
- Louis Marie Julien Viaud or Pierre Loti (1850–1923), French naval officer and novelist, known for his exotic novels and short stories
- Itapucu, 16th- and 17th-century Tupinambá Indian baptized as Louis-Marie

== See also ==
- Jean Louis Marie Eugène Durieu (1800–1874), early French amateur nude photographer
- Eugène Louis-Marie Jancourt (1815–1901), French bassoonist, composer, and pedagogue
- Claude Louis Marie Henri Navier (1785–1836), French engineer and physicist who specialized in mechanics
- Jean Louis Marie Poiret (1755–1834), French clergyman, botanist and explorer
- Jean Louis Marie Poiseuille (1797–1869), French physicist and physiologist
- Alfred-Armand-Louis-Marie Velpeau (1795–1867), French anatomist and surgeon
- Louise-Marie
