= Marie Dihau =

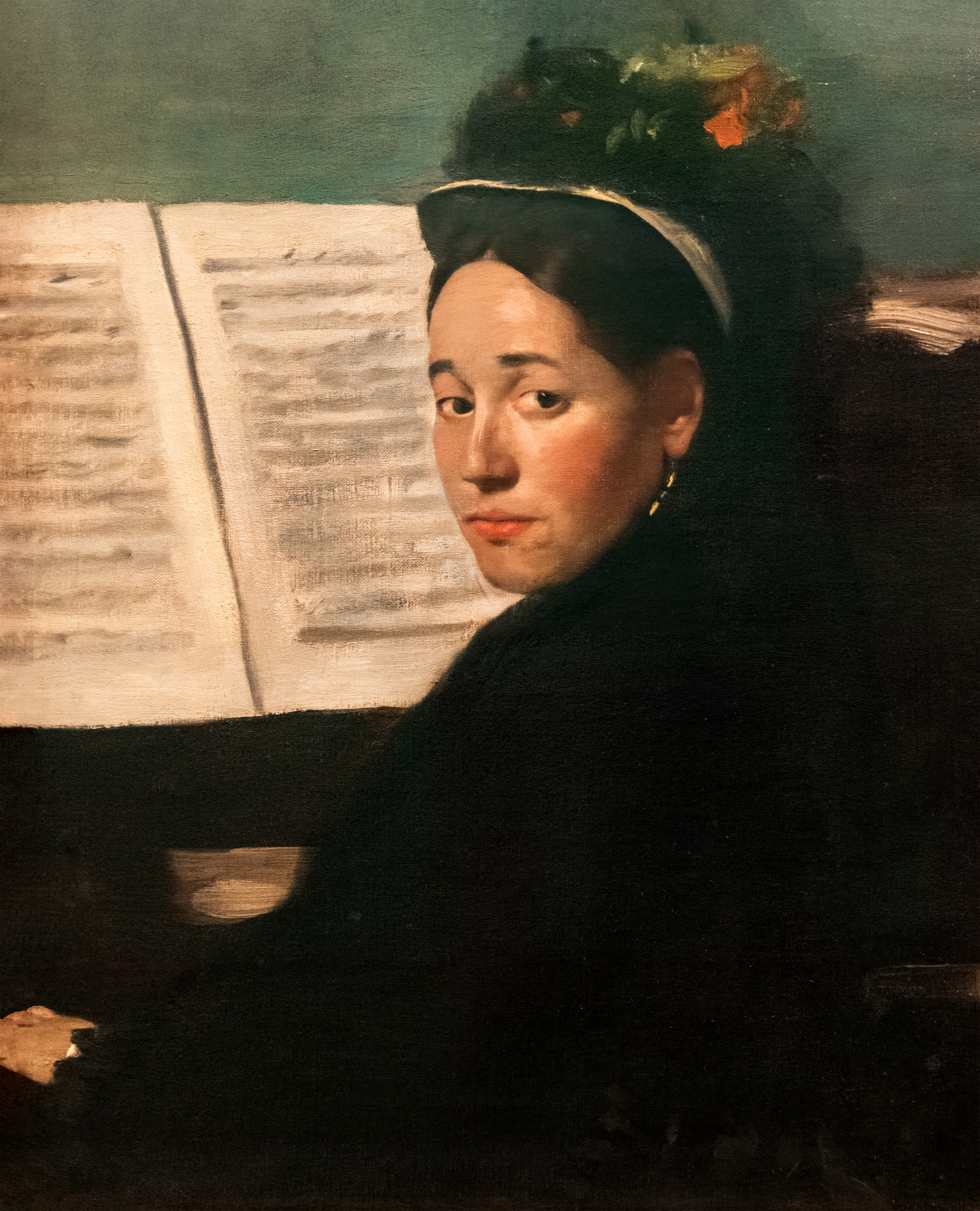
Edgar Degas, Mademoiselle Dihau au piano (1869-1872, Musée d'Orsay)

Marie Dihau (12 September 1843 – 14 May 1935) was a French singer, pianist as well as singing and piano teacher.

== Life ==
Henri de Toulouse-Lautrec, Mademoiselle Dihau au piano, (1890, Musée Toulouse-Lautrec.

Dihau was born in Lille in 1843.

She studied music at the Conservatoire de Lille where she obtained a First prize in 1862. She was the sister of Désiré Dihau, ten years her senior, a bassoon player at the Paris Opera and composer, whose melodies she interpreted. A teacher of singing and piano, she was a pianist by the Concerts Colonne and singer at the Orchestre de la Société des concerts du Conservatoire. She divided her time between her hometown and Paris where she settled with her brother after the 1870 Franco-Prussian War.

It is in their apartment on Montmartre, at number 6 rue Frochot, that Henri de Toulouse-Lautrec, their cousin, was introduced to Edgar Degas. In 1867-1868, he painted her first portrait, Mademoiselle Marie Dihau, kept at the Metropolitan Museum of Art. Between 1869 and 1872, he painted a second portrait of the artist, Mademoiselle Dihau au piano, kept at the Musée d'Orsay in Paris.

In 1890, Lautrec, who called himself her "ordinary painter", a great admirer of Degas, painted another portrait entitled Mademoiselle Dihau au piano, kept at the Musée Toulouse-Lautrec of Albi and in 1898 La Leçon de chant where Dihau at the piano accompanies her friend Mrs Janne Favereau standing up. The painting is exposed at the Mohamed Mahmoud Khalil Museum of Cairo.

The paintings are hung in the Dihau's living room and then, after Désiré's death in 1909, in Marie's modest apartment on rue Victor-Massé where "the charming old maid lives off a small income and the product of the music lessons she gives, often free of charge, to the young girls of Montmartre who are preparing to sing in the cafés". In need of money, she sold her first portrait painted by Degas to the Metropolitan Museum of Art in New York in 1922. Not wanting to separate herself from the two other Degas paintings she owned, The Orchestra at the Opera (fr. L'Orchestre de l'Opéra ) and her portrait on the piano, she sold them to the Musée du Luxembourg in 1923, subject to usufruct and the payment of an annual rent of 12,000 Francs, financed by David David-Weill for L'Orchestre and Marcel Guérin for the portrait. Faced with the enthusiasm aroused, during an exhibition in 1924 at the Galerie Petit, by the two works which had never before been shown to the public, except for a few artists and a few relatives of the Dihau such as Toulouse-Lautrec, the contract was bought by the Musée du Louvre where they were exhibited after Dihau's death in 1935. They were transferred to the Musée d'Orsay in 1986. Under the same conditions, she bequeathed her portrait and the portraits of her two brothers painted by Toulouse-Lautrec to the city of Albi, which assigned them to the Toulouse-Lautrec Museum upon her death.

Dihau died in Paris on 14 May 1935 at age 92.
