= Hurault =

Hurault is a French surname. Notable people with the surname include:

- Etienne-Joseph Hurault (1873–1934), bishop of Nancy from 1930 to 1934
- Philippe Hurault de Cheverny (1528–1599), chancellor of France
- Louis Marie Charles Hurault de Sorbée (1786–?), French soldier
