= Désiré Dihau =

French bassoonist and composer

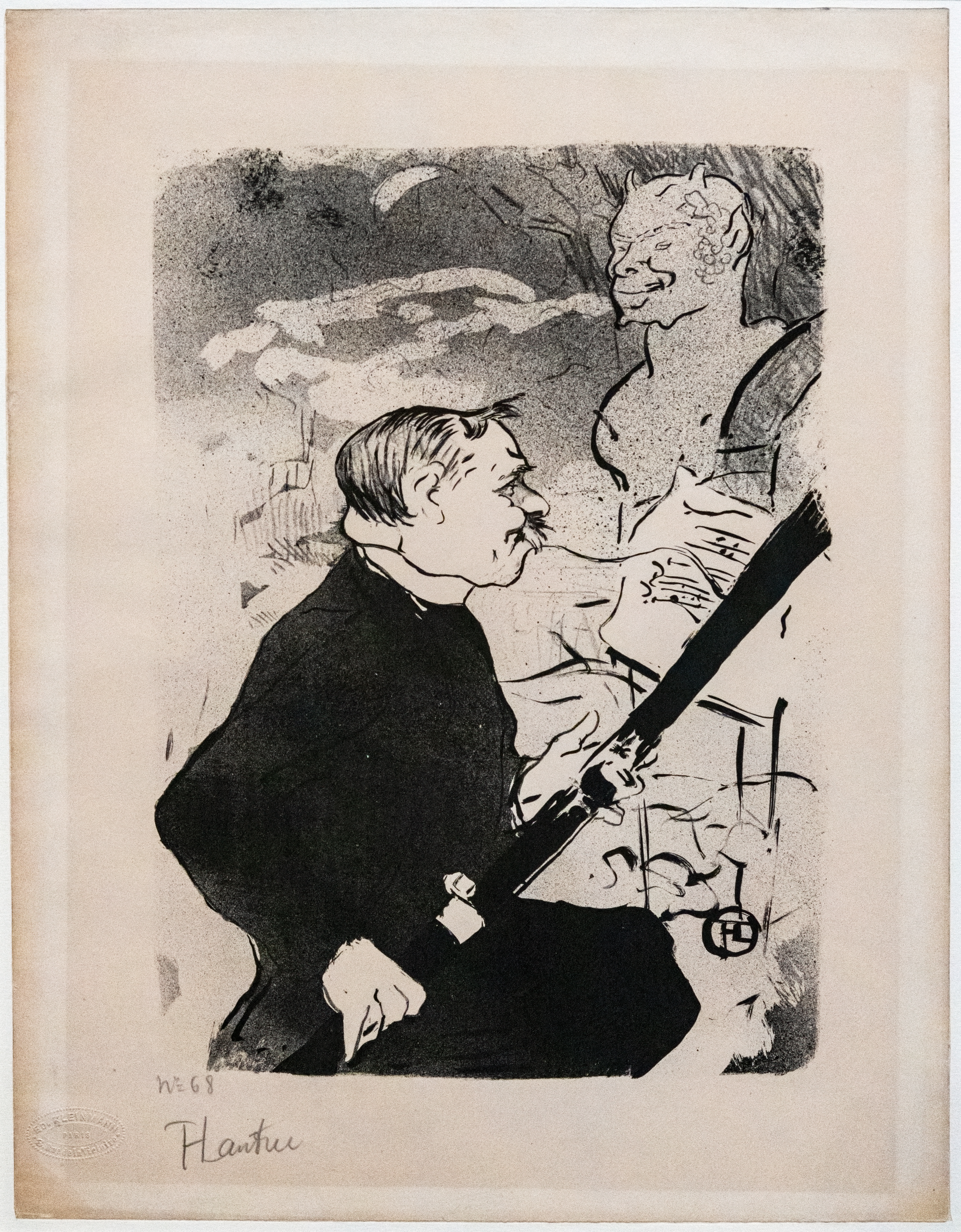
- Les Vieilles Histoires... Pour toi ! Portrait of Désiré Dihau (1893); Lithograph by Henri de Toulouse-Lautrec
- Born: Désiré Hippolyte Dihau; 2 August 1833; Lille
- Died: 20 August 1909 (aged 76); Paris
- Occupation(s): Bassoonist; Composer

Désiré Dihau (2 August 1833 – 20 August 1909) was a French bassoonist and composer. He was the bassoonist painted by Edgar Degas in The Orchestra at the Opera (L'Orchestre de l'Opéra) with the cellist Louis-Marie Pilet seated behind him.

== Biography ==
Désiré Hippolyte Dihau was born 2 August 1833 in Lille. He studied music at the Conservatory of his hometown and then at the Conservatoire de Paris where he obtained a First prize of bassoon in 1857 and a second one in 1865. He was at the pulpits of the orchestras of the Théâtre-Lyrique and of the Théâtre des Bouffes-Parisiens. He was also a solo bassoon at the Eldorado, the Cirque d'hiver of Paris for the Pasdeloup Orchestra and at the Théâtre du Châtelet for the Concerts Colonne.

He is best known for being the bassoonist of the Paris Opera, where he played from July 1, 1862, to December 31, 1889, immortalized by Edgar Degas in the 1870 painting, L'Orchestre de l'Opéra, preceded by a sketch kept at the Fine Arts Museums of San Francisco. Degas also depicted him in other paintings in which were present the musicians of the Salle Le Peletier, Musiciens à l'orchestre in 1872 and both versions, of 1871 and 1876, of the ballet of Robert le Diable. Degas probably met Dihau at the Mère Lefebvre, rue de La Tour-d'Auvergne in Montmartre where artists and musicians gathered. It is Dihau who introduced Degas to the opera where the painter found his strongest inspiration in the spectacle of the dancers he so often painted.

In the early 1890s, Dihau composed melodies for his poet friends like Jean Richepin, sometimes interpreted by his sister Marie Dihau. His scores for the artists of Le Chat noir were illustrated by his cousin Henri de Toulouse-Lautrec.

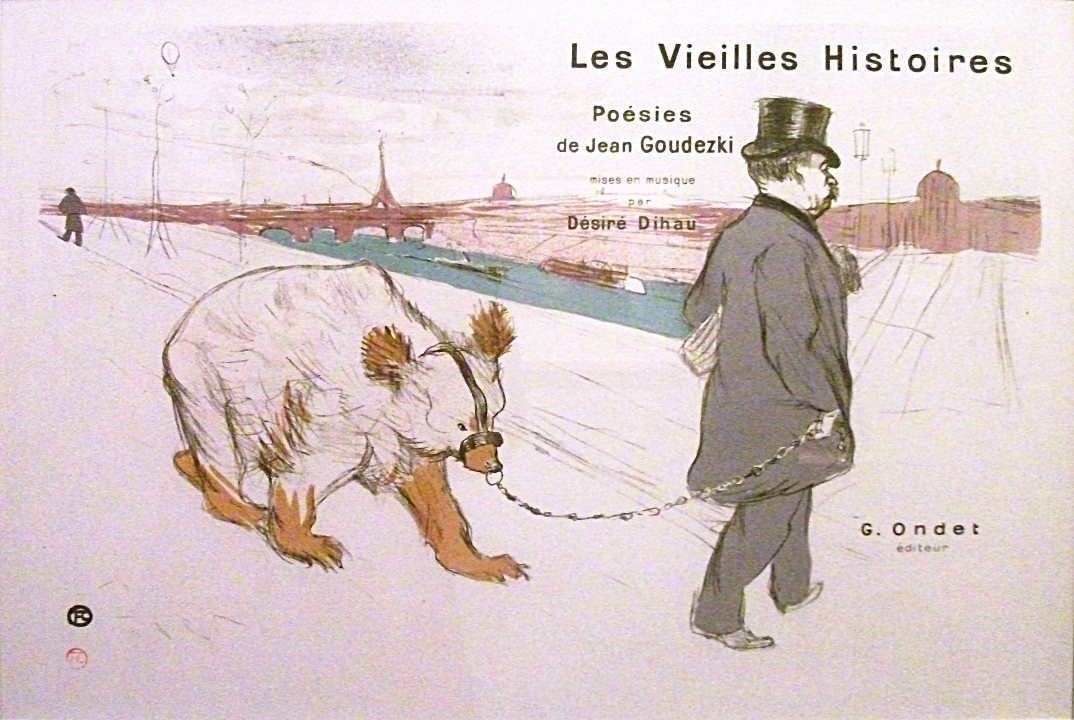
Henri de Toulouse-Lautrec, Les Vieilles Histoires, (Bibliothèque de l'Institut national d'histoire de l'art, 1893)

For the cover of the Vieilles Histoires, subtitled "répertoire mondain", a collection of poems by Jean Goudezki set in music by Désiré Dihau and published by Ondet in 1893, Lautrec drew a lithograph representing the musician, his bassoon under his arm, pulling the bear Goudezki by the leash to lead him to the Institut de France via the pont des Arts. The plate titled Pour toi!, in the same collection, is a portrait of Désiré Dihau inspired by L'Orchestre de l'Opéra by Edgar Degas which Lautrec much admired. Another lithograph by Lautrec depicts Dihau in Anna Judic's lodge in 1894 while her corset is being laced. The lithograph is kept at the Albright–Knox Art Gallery in Buffalo. A drawing of 1896 depicts him in a bust of profile.

Toulouse-Lautrec also painted two portraits of Désiré Dihau in 1890 and 1891: the first, simply titled Désire Dihau, shows Dihau sitting three-quarter back, reading a newspaper; The second, entitled Monsieur Désiré Dihau, basson de l'Opéra, represents the musician standing, in front bust, in suit and top hat. The two portraits were drawn in the garden of Père Forest (rue Forest), as was a portrait of Henri Dihau, brother of Désiré and Marie and kept at the musée Toulouse-Lautrec of Albi.

As for the Degas, they were hung in the living room of the Dihau and then, after Désiré's death in 1909, in the modest apartment that his sister occupied rue Victor Massé

The charming old lady lived on a small income and produced music lessons she gave, often for free, to the girls of Montmartre who were preparing to sing in the cafés.

For lack of money, she sold her first portrait painted by Degas at the Metropolitan Museum of Art in New York in 1922. Not wanting to part with the other two Degas paintings she owned, The Opera Orchestra and her portrait on the piano, she gave them to the Musée du Luxembourg in 1923, subject to usufruct and the payment of an annual rent of 12,000 francs, financed by David David-Weill for L'Orchestre and Marcel Guérin (art critic) for the portrait. Faced with the enthusiasm raised during an exhibition in 1924 at the Galerie Petit, by the two works, which had never before been shown to the public, apart from a few artists and some relatives of the Dihau like Toulouse-Lautrec, the contract was bought by the Louvre where they were exhibited after the death of Marie Dihau in 1935. They were transferred to the Musée d'Orsay in 1986.

Désiré Dihau died in Paris 20 August 1909.

== Gallery ==
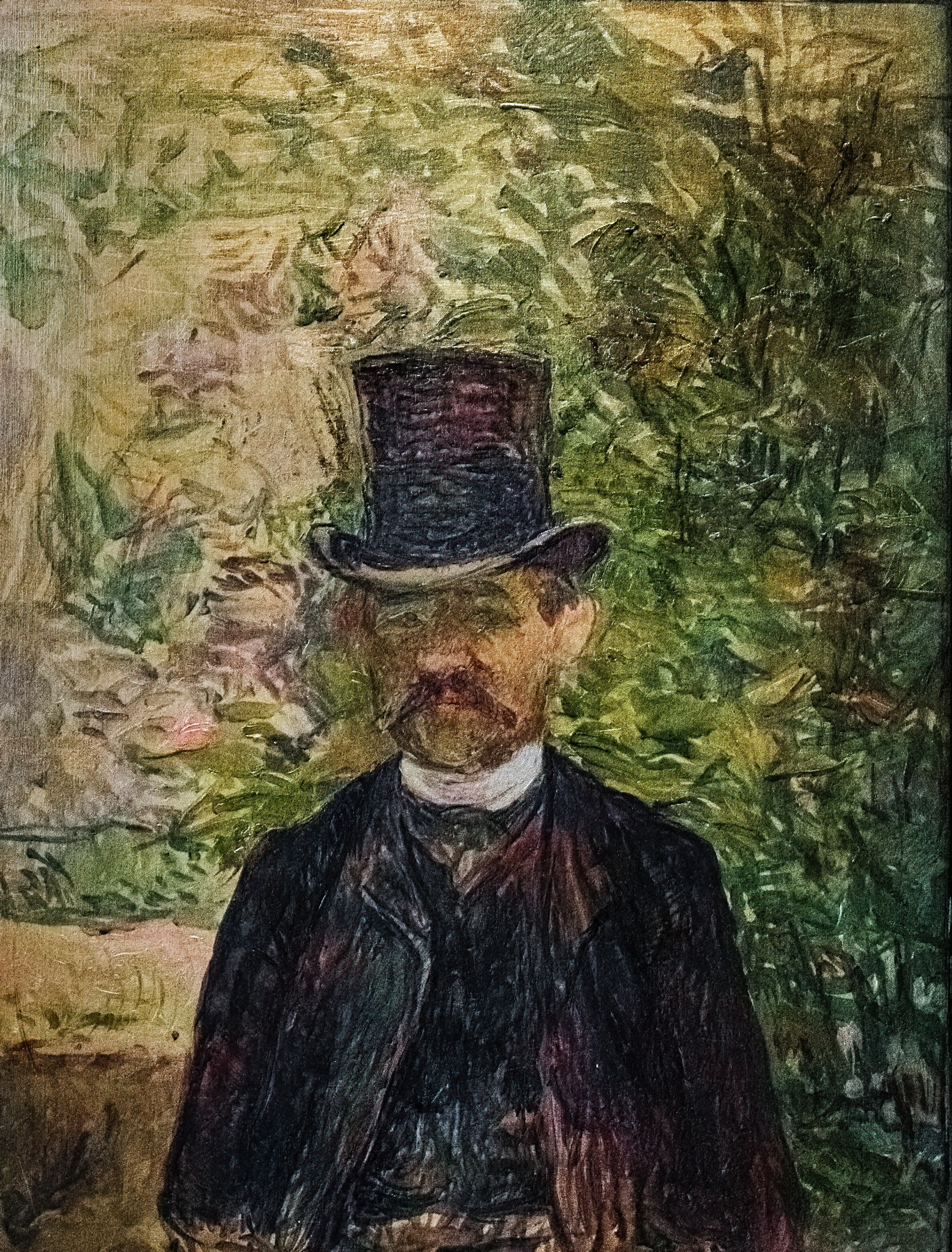
Mr. Désiré Dihau, basson de l'Opéra - Toulouse-Lautrec 1891

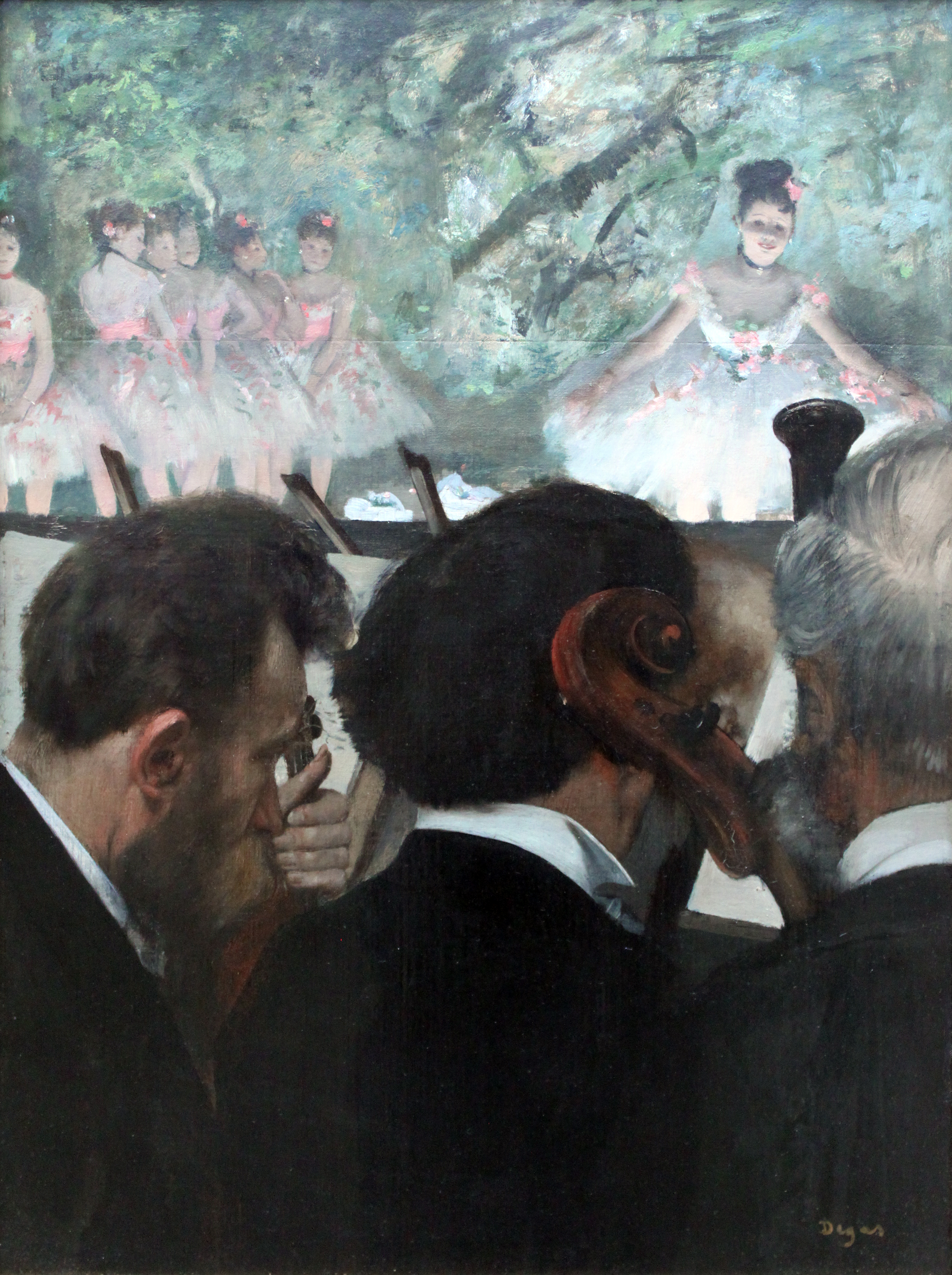
Degas, Musiciens à l'orchestre (the Städel, 1872)

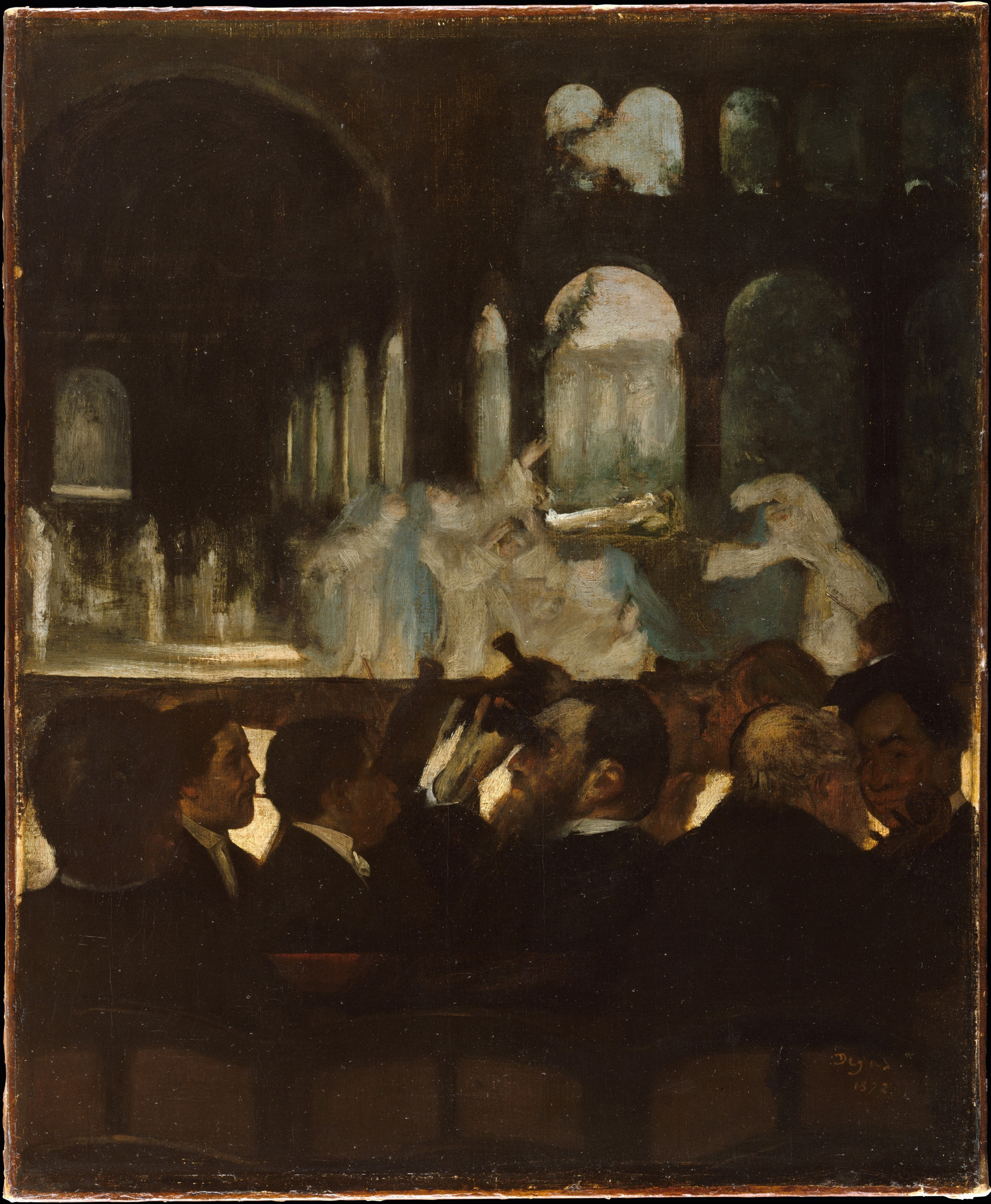
Degas, Le Ballet de "Robert le Diable" (Metropolitan Museum of Art, 1871)

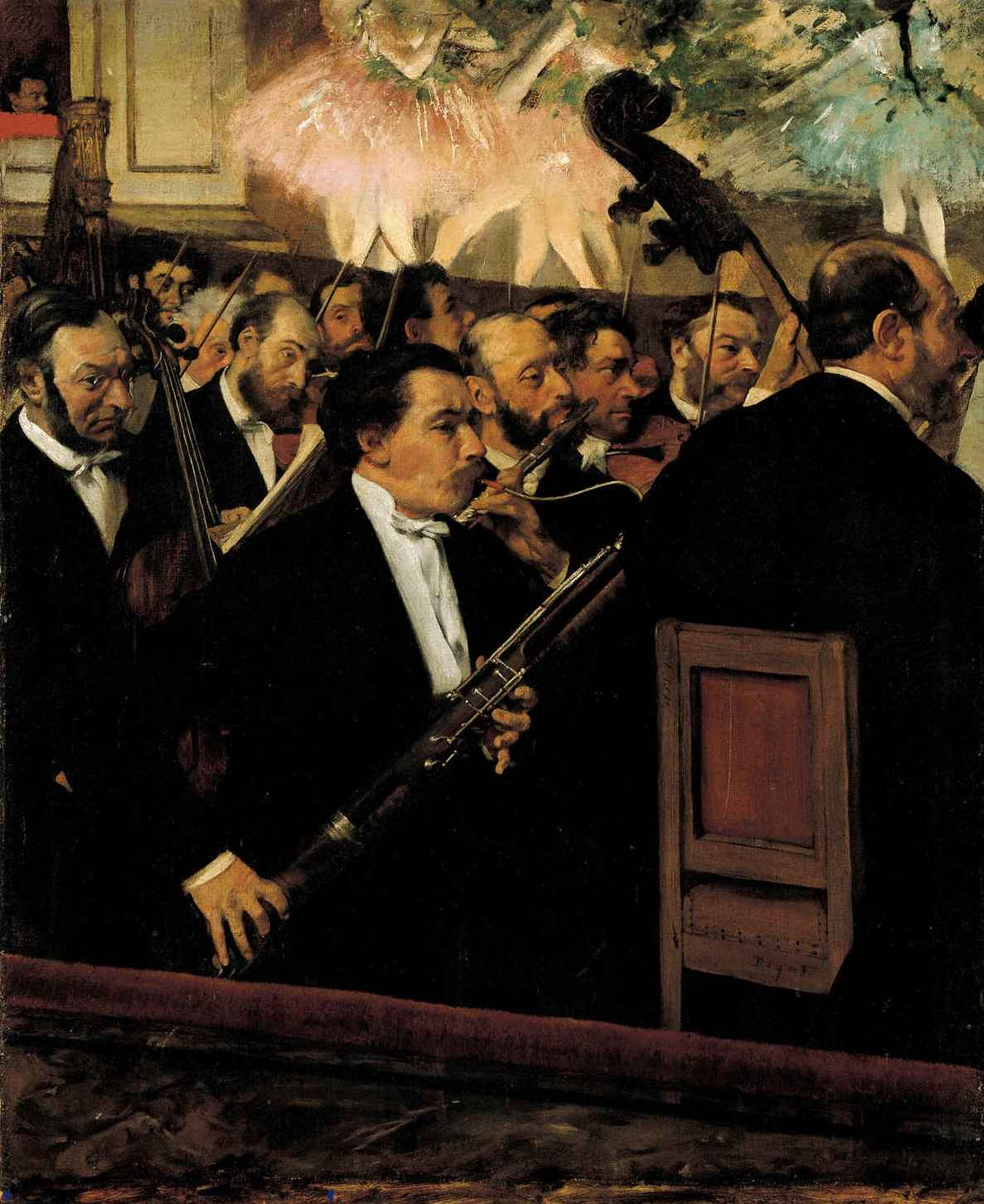
Edgar Degas, L'Orchestre de l'Opéra (Musée d'Orsay, circa 1870)

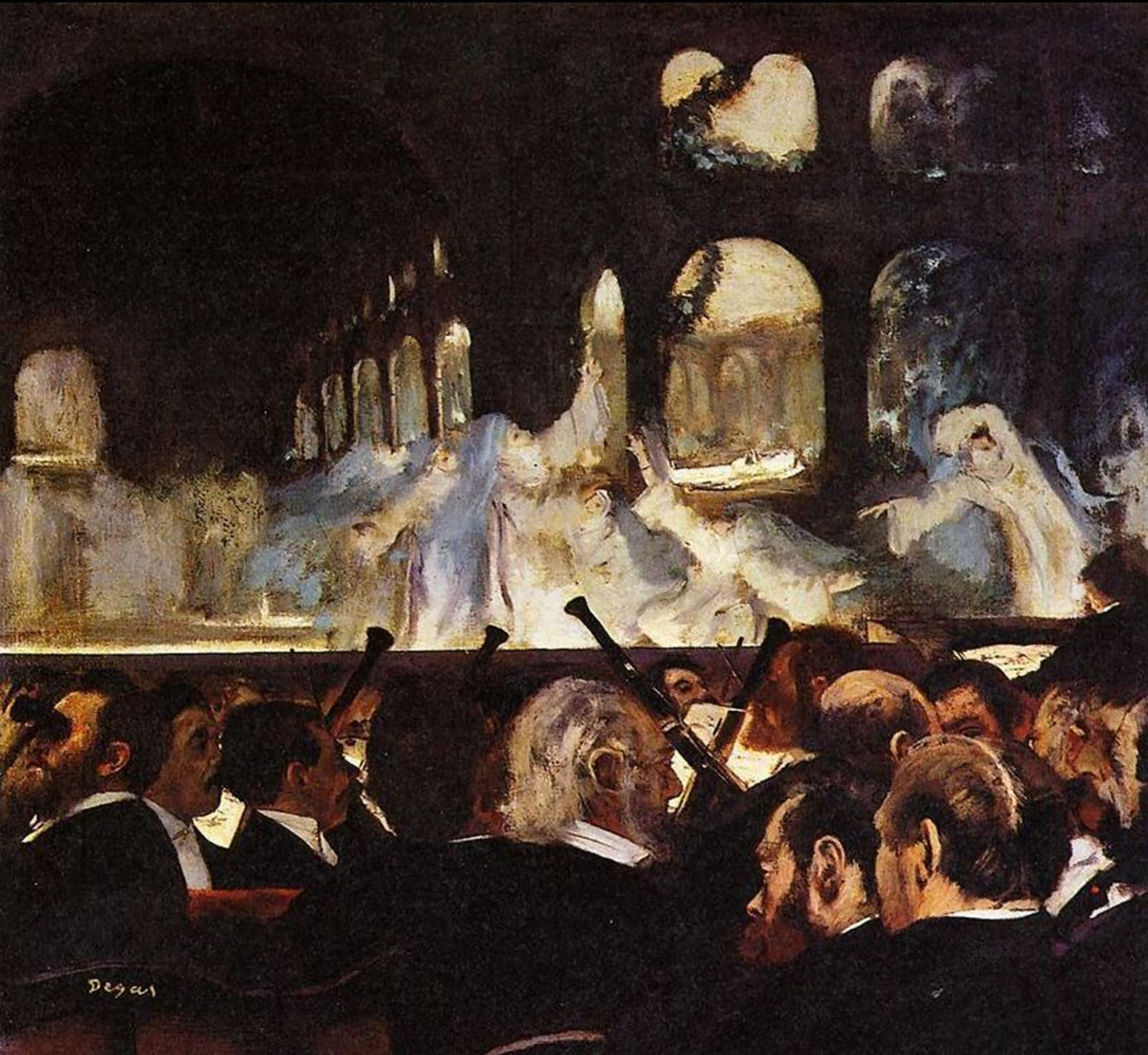
Degas, Le Ballet de « Robert le Diable » (Victoria and Albert Museum, 1876)

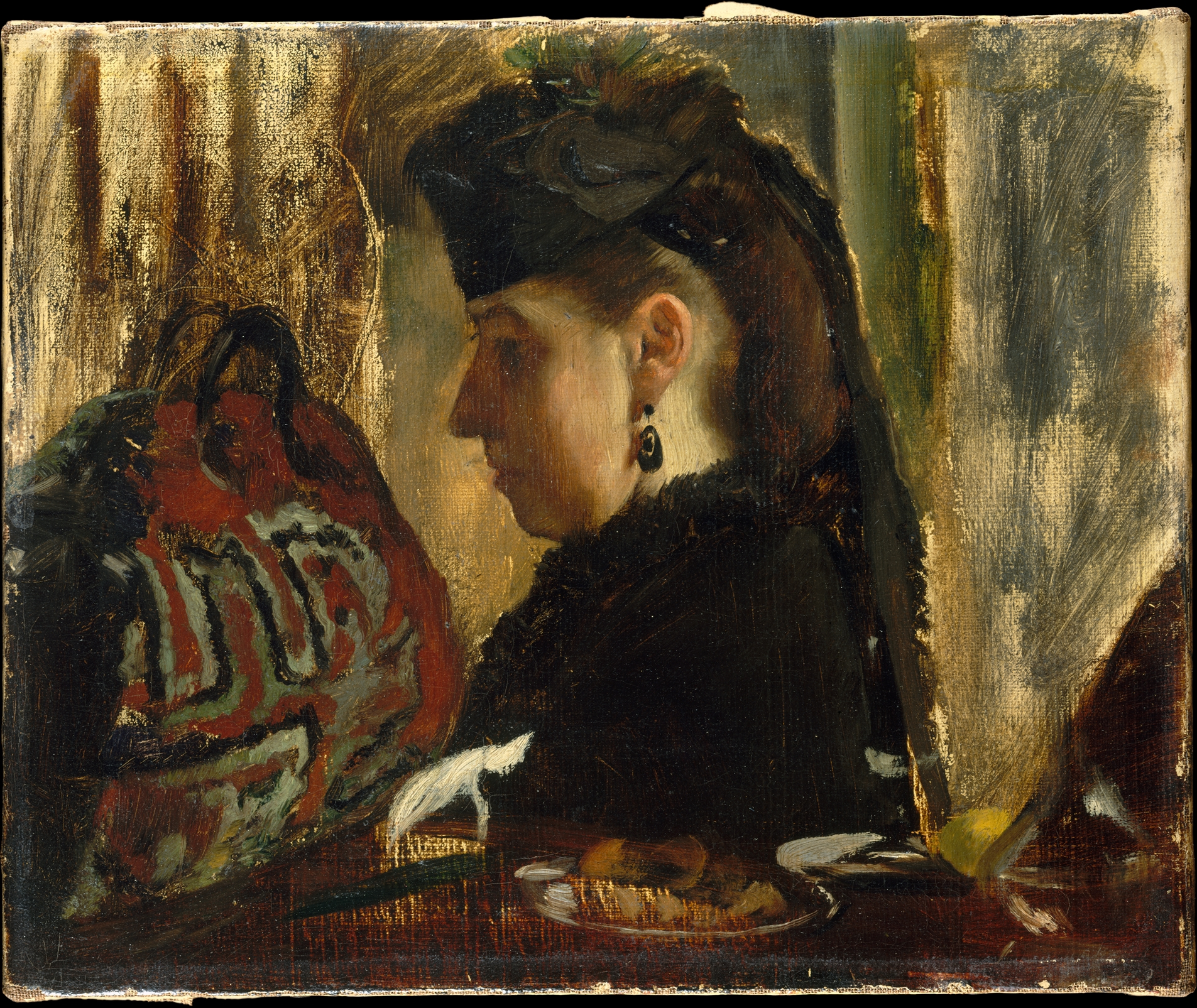
Mademoiselle Marie Dihau (Metropolitan Museum of Art, 1967–1968)

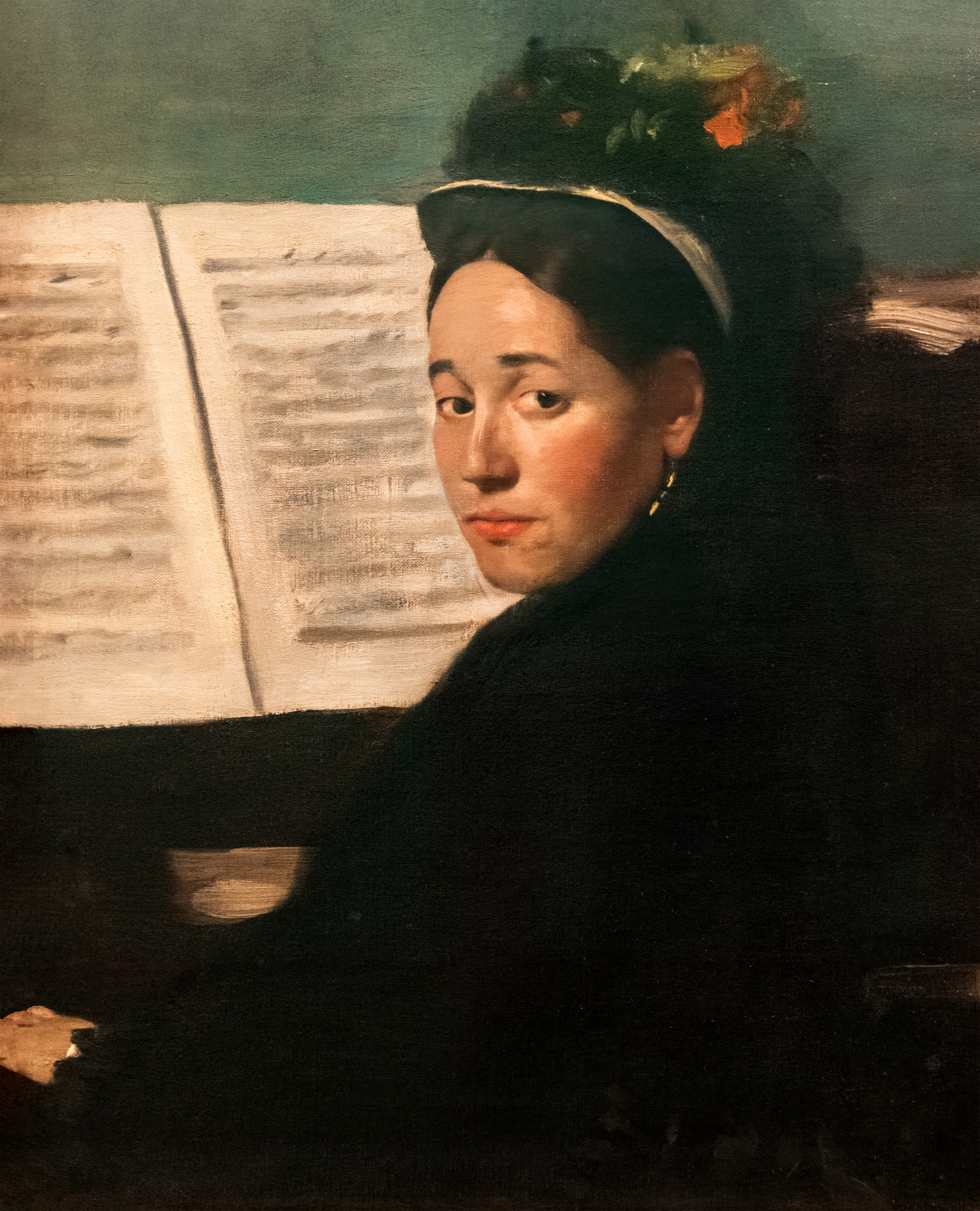
Mademoiselle Dihau au piano (Degas) (musée d'Orsay, 1869)

Mademoiselle Dihau au piano (Toulouse-Lautrec) (Musée Toulouse-Lautrec, 1890)
