= Michon =

Michon is a surname. Notable people with the surname include:

- Alex Michon, British artist
- Alexandre Michon (1858–1921), Russian photographer and film director
- Cathryn Michon, actress, writer and stand-up comic
- Emmanuel Michon (born 1955), French former ice speed skater
- Ingrid Michon (born 1976), Dutch politician
- Jean-Louis Michon (1924–2013), French traditionalist scholar and translator who specializes in Islamic art and Sufism
- Louis-Marie Michon (1802–1866), French surgeon
- Mélina Robert-Michon (born 1979), French discus thrower
- Pierre Michon (born 1945), French writer
- Stéphane Michon (born 1969), French Nordic combined skier who competed in the 1990s
