= La Guerche-de-Bretagne =

La Guerche-de-Bretagne Gwerc'h-Breizh (Breton)
- Commune
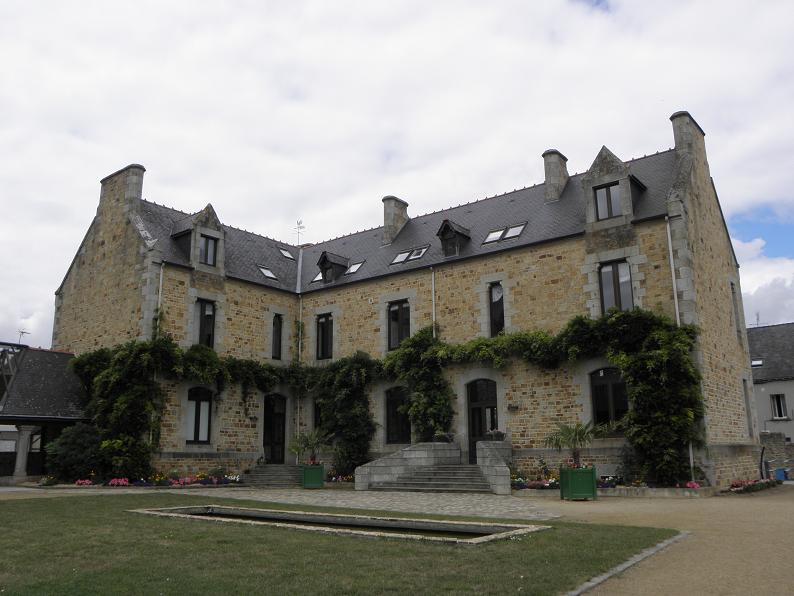
- The town hall of La Guerche-de-Bretagne

- Coat of arms
- Location of La Guerche-de-Bretagne
- Location within France Location within Brittany
- Coordinates: 47°56′32″N 1°13′43″W
- Country: France
- Region: Brittany
- Department: Ille-et-Vilaine
- Arrondissement: Fougères-Vitré
- Canton: La Guerche-de-Bretagne
- Intercommunality: CA Vitré Communauté

Government
  - Mayor (2020–2026): Élisabeth Guiheneux
- Area^{1}: 11.53 km^{2} (4.45 sq mi)
- Highest elevation: 91 m (299 ft)
- Lowest elevation: 51 m (167 ft)
- Population (2023): 4,554
  - Density: 395.0/km^{2} (1,023/sq mi)
- Time zone: UTC+01:00 (CET)
  - Summer (DST): UTC+02:00 (CEST)
- INSEE/Postal code: 35125 /35130
- ^{1} French Land Register data, which excludes lakes, ponds, glaciers > 1 km^{2} (0.386 sq mi or 247 acres) and river estuaries.

La Guerche-de-Bretagne (French pronunciation: [la ɡɛʁʃ də bʁətaɲ]; Breton: Gwerc'h-Breizh) is a commune in the Ille-et-Vilaine department in Brittany in northwestern France.

The cellist Louis-Marie Pilet (1815–1877) was born in La Guerche-de-Bretagne.

== Population ==
Inhabitants of La Guerche-de-Bretagne are called Guerchais in French.

Historical population
Year	Pop.	±% p.a.
1968	3,422	—
1975	3,742	+1.29%
1982	4,055	+1.15%
1990	4,123	+0.21%
1999	4,095	−0.08%
2007	4,163	+0.21%
2012	4,273	+0.52%
2017	4,243	−0.14%
2023	4,554	+1.19%
Source: INSEE

== See also ==
- Communes of the Ille-et-Vilaine department
