= Portrait of Toulouse Lautrec, in Villeneuve-sur-Yonne, with the Natansons =

Painting by Édouard Vuillard in the Musée Toulouse-Lautrec

- Artist: Édouard Vuillard
- Year: 1898
- Medium: oil paint on cardboard
- Dimensions: 39 cm × 30 cm (15 in × 12 in)
- Location: Musée Toulouse-Lautrec; Albi

Portrait of Toulouse Lautrec, in Villeneuve-sur-Yonne, with the Natansons, sometimes referred to as Toulouse-Lautrec Cooking, is an 1898 painting by French artist Édouard Vuillard. The work depicts fellow artist Henri de Toulouse-Lautrec on holiday cooking in the kitchen at Les Relais, the country home of Vuillard's patron Thadée Natanson in the city of Villeneuve-sur-Yonne, in north-central France. Vuillard's painting captures Lautrec in a rare, sober state of mind, cooking his favorite dish of lobster while dressed in rain gear due to a recent storm. In the 1890s, Vuillard often focused on interior, domestic scenes during his summer vacation, producing paintings depicting ordinary people engaging in everyday life.

Both Vuillard and Lautrec were guests of the Natansons' salon, which included members of the post-Impressionists in their circle. The country home of Les Relais provided a kind of rehabilitation environment for Lautrec, which the Natansons nurtured and encouraged, even while Lautrec was experiencing alcohol withdrawal syndrome. Lautrec was famous for his culinary pursuits, and was known to combine art and cooking at elaborate parties where he invented new dishes and cocktails. After his death, Lautrec's recipes were collected and published in a cookbook. Vuillard's artistic depiction of Lautrec is thought to be inspired by the work of Diego Velázquez, the Bamboccianti, and Théodule Ribot. The painting is held by the Musée Toulouse-Lautrec, in Albi, France.

== Background ==
In the 1890s, French artist Édouard Vuillard (1868–1940) actively produced work while on holiday in the French countryside, known as his villégiature period. The villégiature, or holiday, typically involved Parisians like Vuillard leaving the city in the summer and taking vacation in the countryside with close friends and family. Unlike a tourist vacation involving activities made famous by the work of an artist like Claude Monet, the type of paintings Vuillard made during a villégiature were characterized by rest, tranquility, and the absence of novelty, focusing on the customary, allowing Vuillard to produce many landscapes and interiors in the countryside.

In 1891, playwright and writer Pierre Veber (1869–1942) introduced Vuillard to his patron Thadée Natanson, who along with his brother Alfred ran La Revue Blanche, the leading art and literary magazine of its time. That same year, Vuillard began exhibiting his work at the offices of the magazine, attracting the attention of the avant-garde and critical approval. In 1893, Thadée Natanson married Misia Godebska (1872–1950), with whom he extended the reach of the magazine into a salon in their various homes, which Vuillard would document in his own work (Salon Natanson, 1897). With Vuillard and Lautrec as regular guests, the Natansons' circle included Pierre Bonnard, Felix Vallotton, and the post-Impressionists known as the Nabis.

Vuillard and fellow artist Henri de Toulouse-Lautrec (1864–1901) first met each other sometime in the early 1890s due to their association with La Revue Blanche, with Lautrec first contributing artwork to the magazine in 1894. That same year, Vuillard received a decorative arts commission from Alexandre Natanson for installation in his home, requiring him to produce nine panels of scenes depicting French parks. By 1896, Vuillard and Lautrec both began making visits to the Natansons' La Grangette estate in Valvins. The next year, the Natansons rented Les Relais, a country estate in Villeneuve-sur-Yonne, where Vuillard and Lautrec continued their previous villégiature tradition from La Grangette. Misia, Thadée's young wife, was said to have been Vuillard's muse, a subject for many of his works, and a love that was unrequited and never consummated. Lautrec was also fond of Misia and showed her great affection, and painted her frequently along with Vuillard.

== Description ==
Lautrec is depicted in a rare state of sobriety, having temporarily given up drinking during a brief vacation to devote himself to cooking country-style foods at Les Relais, the vacation home of the Natansons. His clothing, complete with a gray felt hat, yellow oilskin rain pants, red shirt and kerchief, appears to be rain gear, as a large storm is said to have occurred earlier that day. In the painting, Lautrec appears to be cooking a lobster dish, possibly homard à l'américaine. Within the Natanson household, Lautrec was remembered for preparing lobster in the kitchen at Les Relais. As a huge fan of seafood, lobster was said to have been Lautrec's favorite dish.

== Rehabilitation attempt ==
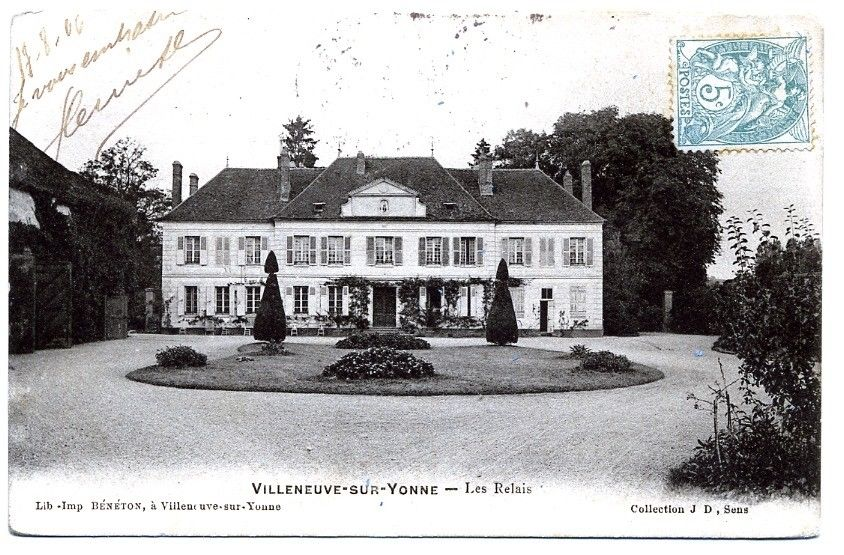
Les Relais (1906)

The Natansons attempted to help Lautrec address his visible and ongoing struggle with alcoholism by providing a non-drinking environment for him at Les Relais for convalescence. There are reports of Lautrec going through alcohol withdrawal at Les Relais, with his behavior displaying signs of alcohol withdrawal syndrome. In one reported incident from the previous year, Lautrec was said to have experienced delirium tremens, with hallucinations causing him to see spiders crawling inside the Natansons' house. Responding to what he thought was an arachnid attack, Lautrec discharged his firearm in self-defense.

== Lautrec and the culinary arts ==
Like Claude Monet, Lautrec was known for his visual artistry and for his cooking. Culinary historian Alexandra Leaf highlights Monet and Lautrec as the two "most serious gourmets" among their peers. Lautrec's love for cooking stemmed from his family upbringing and early childhood where he first learned the importance of culinary values. Before he became widely known as a painter, he was called "Henri the cook" by his cousins.

Lautrec's penchant for art and cooking eventually led him to combine the visual and culinary arts, usually as a formal celebration of the release of new artworks, resulting in legendary parties for which he designed the menu (which were often artworks in themselves), bought and prepared the food, and created and often invented entirely new cocktails. Lautrec's most famous party, held at the Natansons' Paris house in February 1895, is often regarded as one of the most notorious parties in art history. 300 guests were invited, with a claimed 2,000 cocktails served, all accompanied by side dishes of gourmet food, with Lautrec working diligently as the sole chef and bartender, dressed in a white linen jacket, complete with a freshly shaved bald head and no beard. Ironically, by the end of the night, Lautrec appeared to be the only one still awake and sober.

Lautrec was part of a group of gourmands, initially formed by Gustave Geffroy (1855–1926), the historian of the Impressionists, and Claude Monet, who met up every Friday night for dinner at Drouant, a restaurant in the Palais Garnier neighborhood. After Lautrec's death, his close friend Maurice Joyant published Lautrec's collection of recipes in the book La Cuisine de Monsieur Momo, Célibataire (1930), along with a color book frontispiece of Toulouse Lautrec Cooking by Vuillard. It was revised in 1966 as L'art de la cuisine. The cookbook features 150 recipes, many of which were Lautrec's signature dishes, such as "Catalan salad". Art historian Charles Stuckey describes it as the first cookbook ever published by an artist, albeit posthumously.

== Influences ==
Art historians believe Vuillard's Toulouse-Lautrec Cooking was influenced by the work of Spanish painter Diego Velázquez (1599–1660) of the Spanish Golden Age, particularly his series of portrait work featuring people with dwarfism. Other influences include 17th-century genre painting of the Bamboccianti during the Dutch Golden Age, characterized by everyday peasant subjects such as people preparing food, and the work of French realist Théodule Ribot (1823–1891), who was known for painting kitchens and cooks.

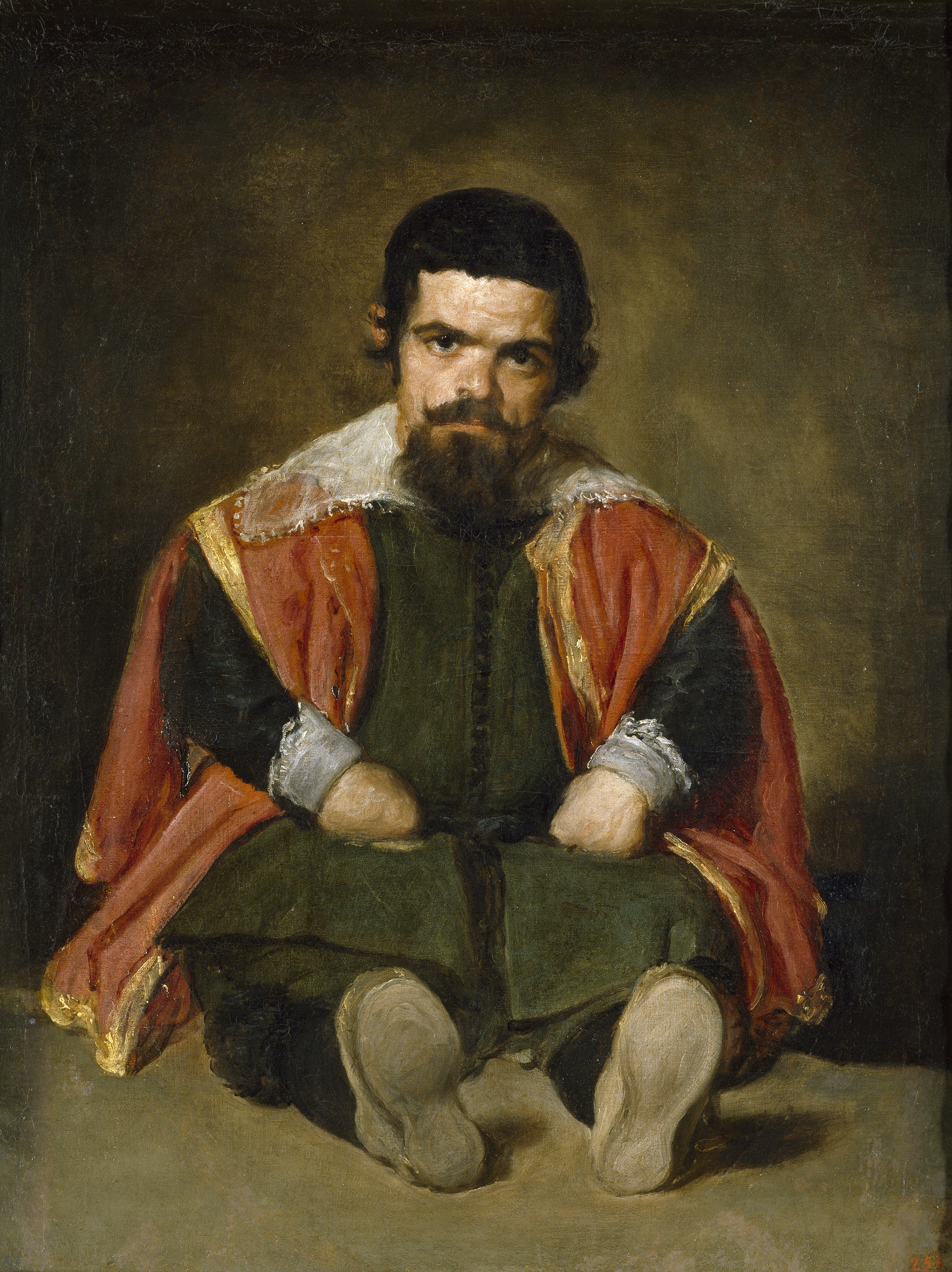
Portrait of Sebastián de Morra (1644) by Diego Velázquez

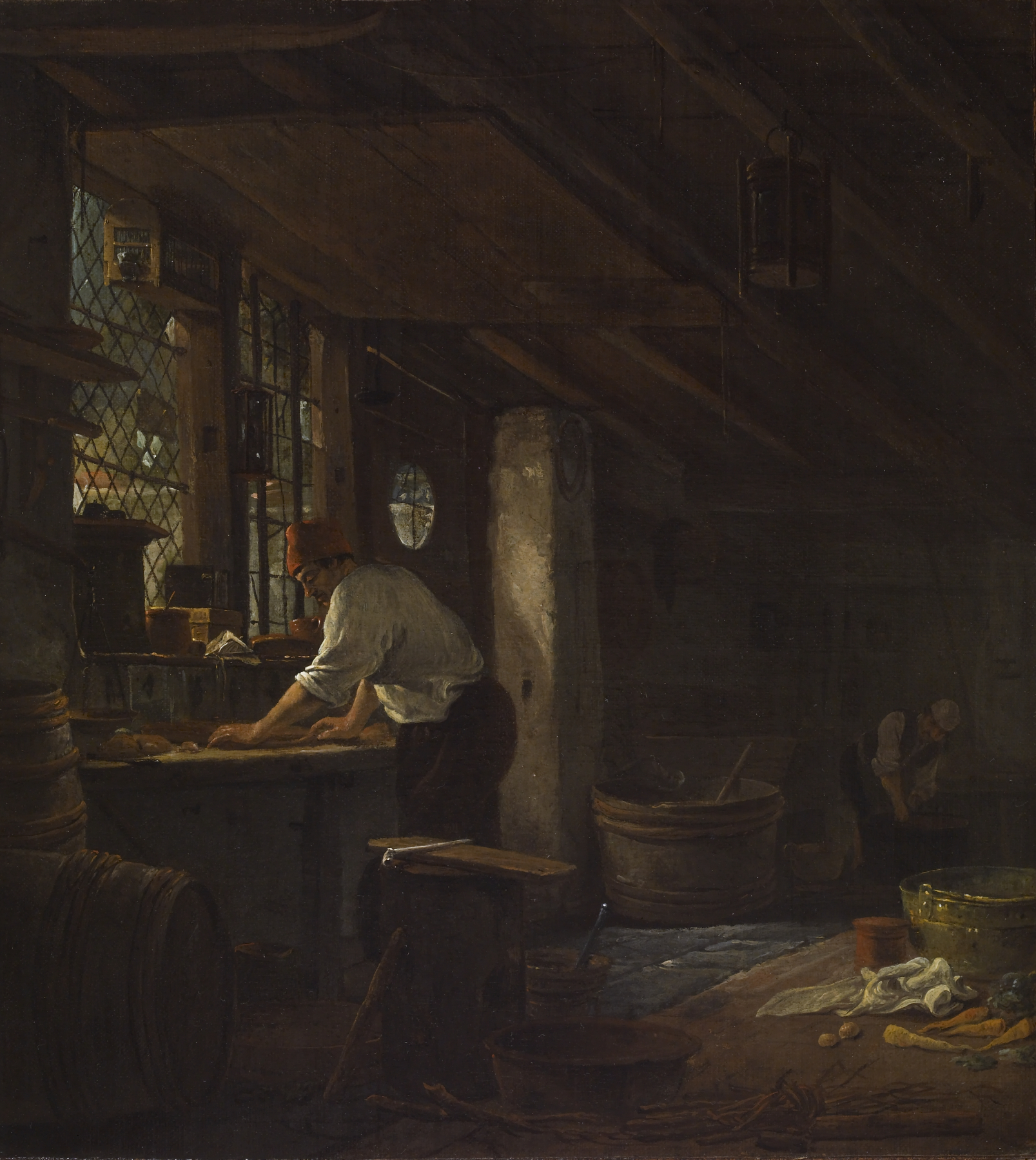
Kitchen Interior (ca. 1650–1670) by Thomas Wyck

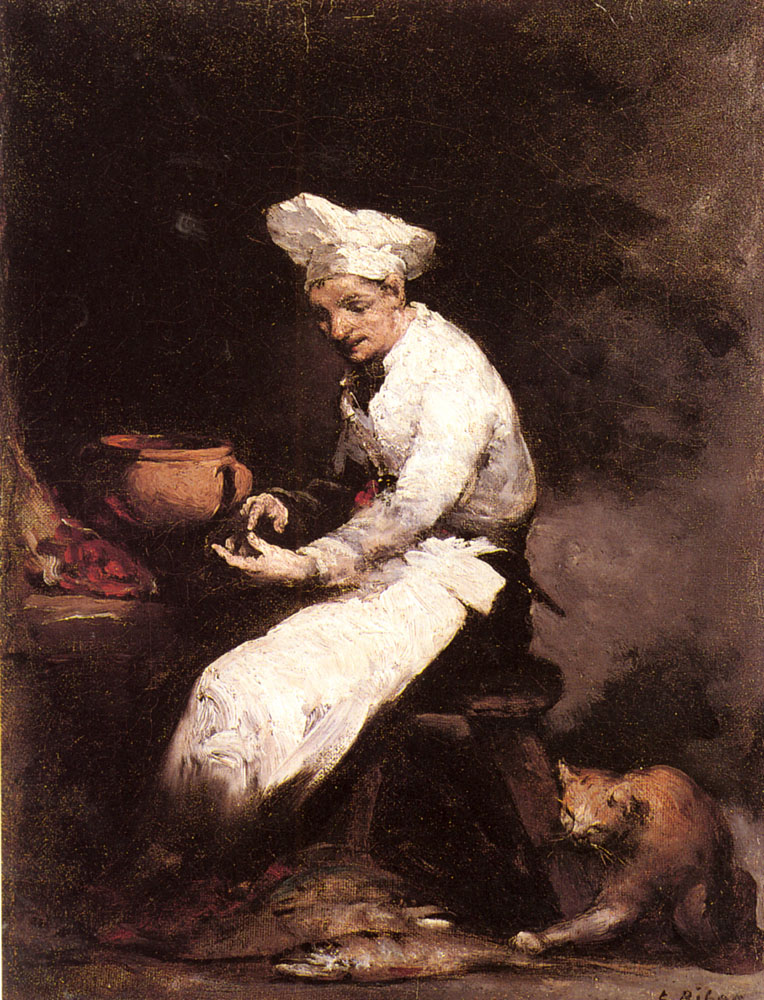
The Cook and the Cat (n.d.) by Théodule Ribot

== Provenance ==
The painting was donated in 1914 by Lautrec's close friend and art dealer Maurice Joyant (1864–1930) to the Musée Toulouse-Lautrec in Albi, France. It was first exhibited several decades later in 1931. The long title of the work is often shortened to Toulouse-Lautrec Cooking in the literature.

== Related work ==
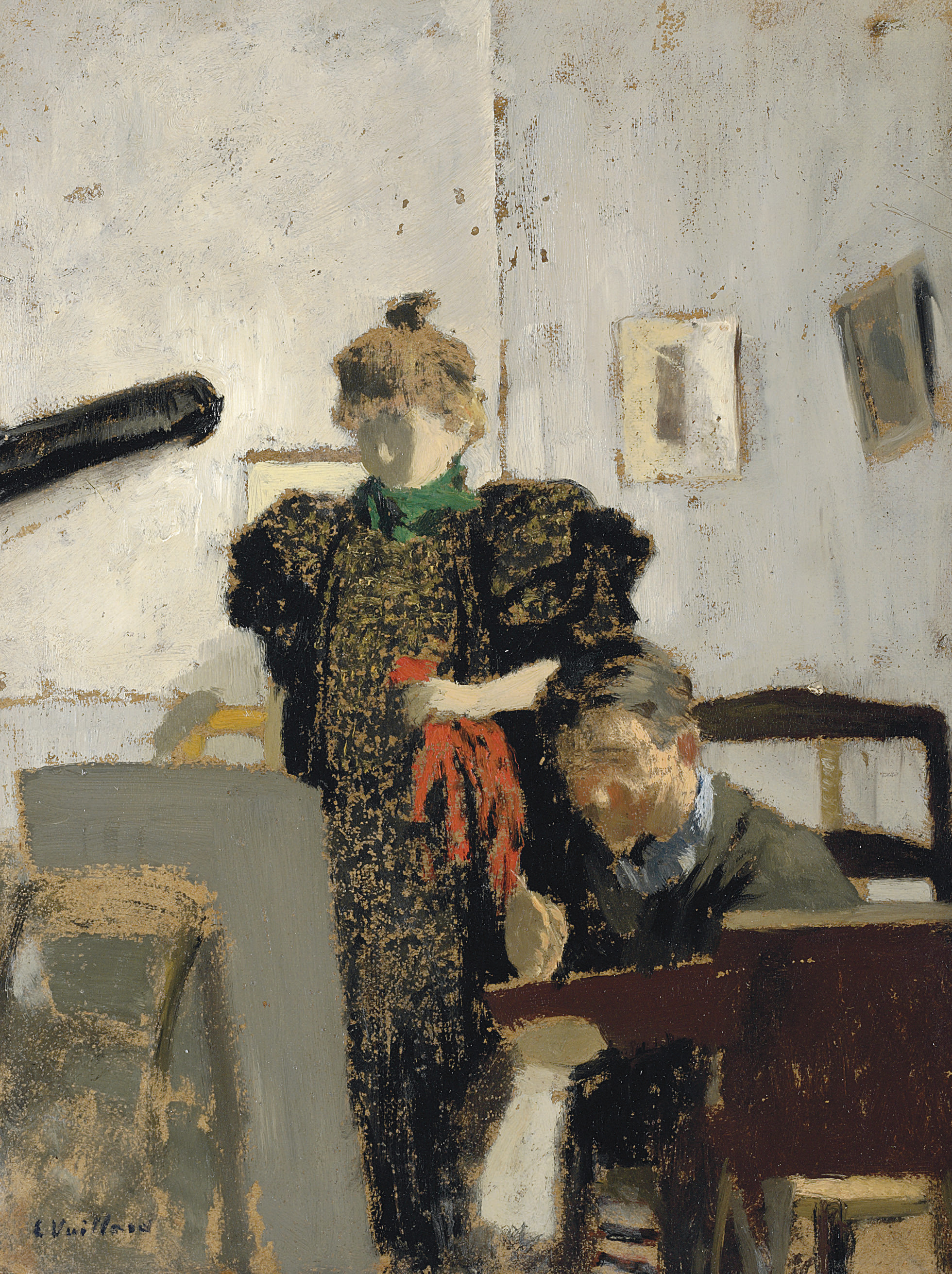
Vallotton at the Natansons (1897) by Édouard Vuillard

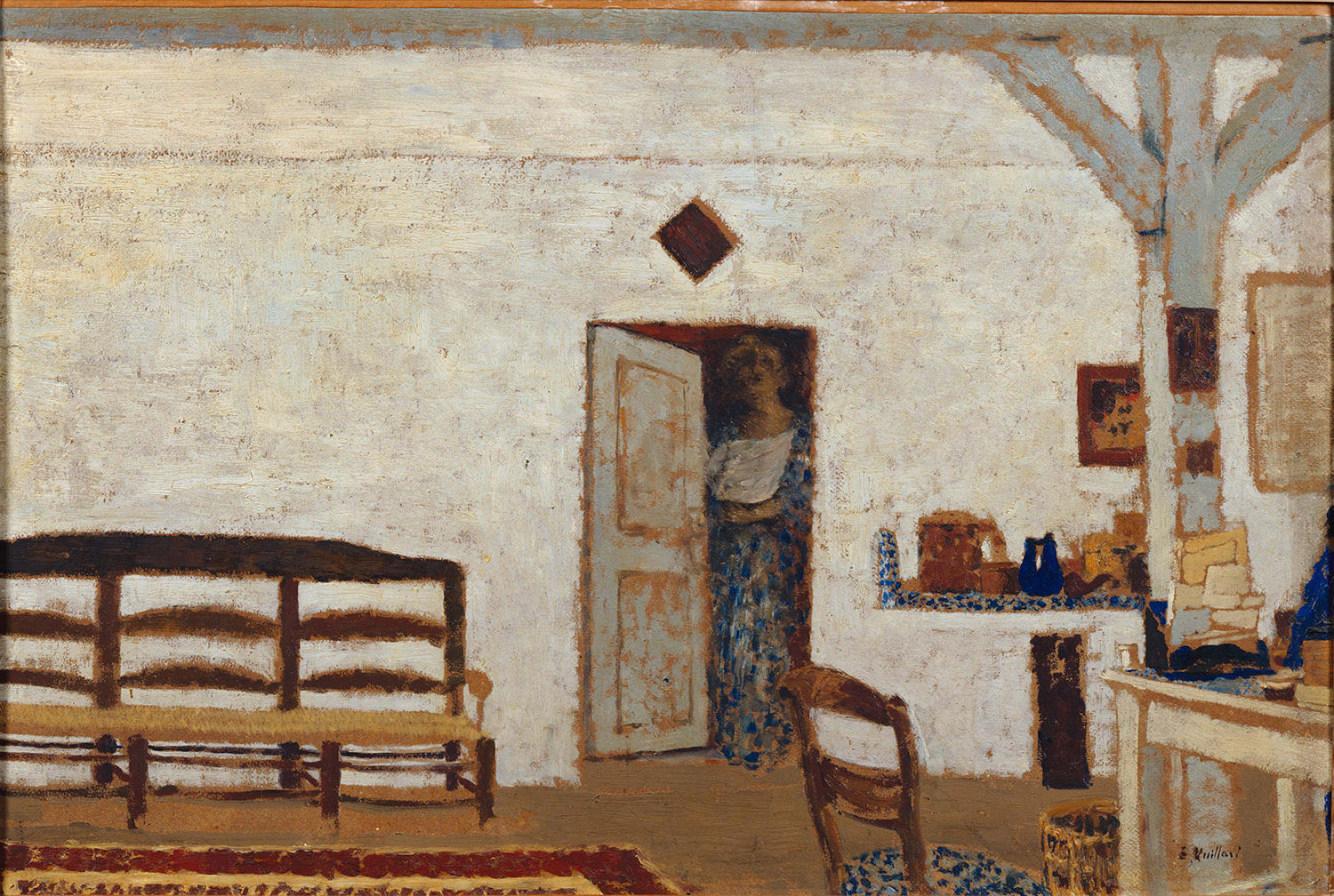
Misia in Villeneuve-sur-Yonne (1898) by Édouard Vuillard

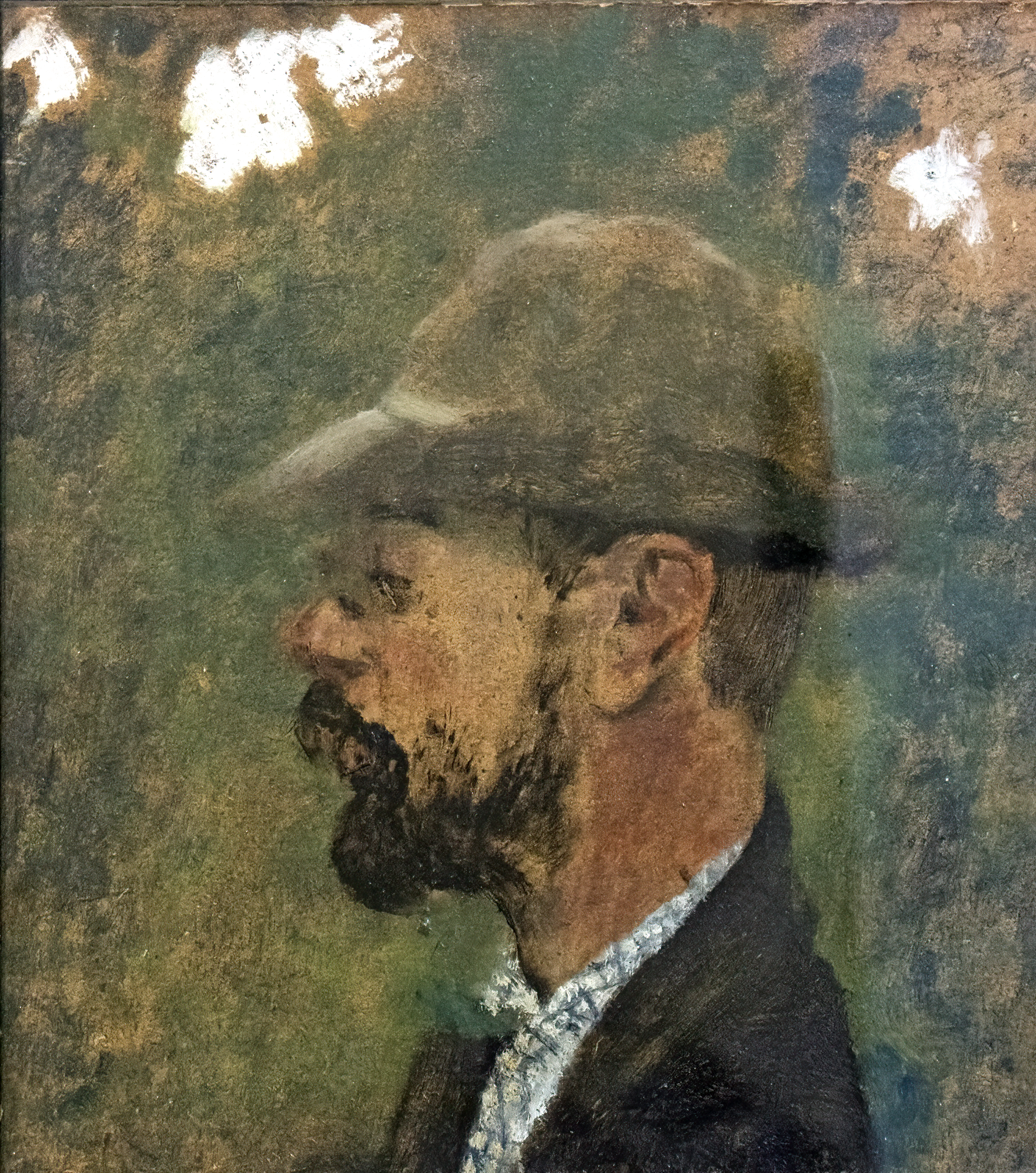
Profile of Toulouse-Lautrec (1898) by Édouard Vuillard

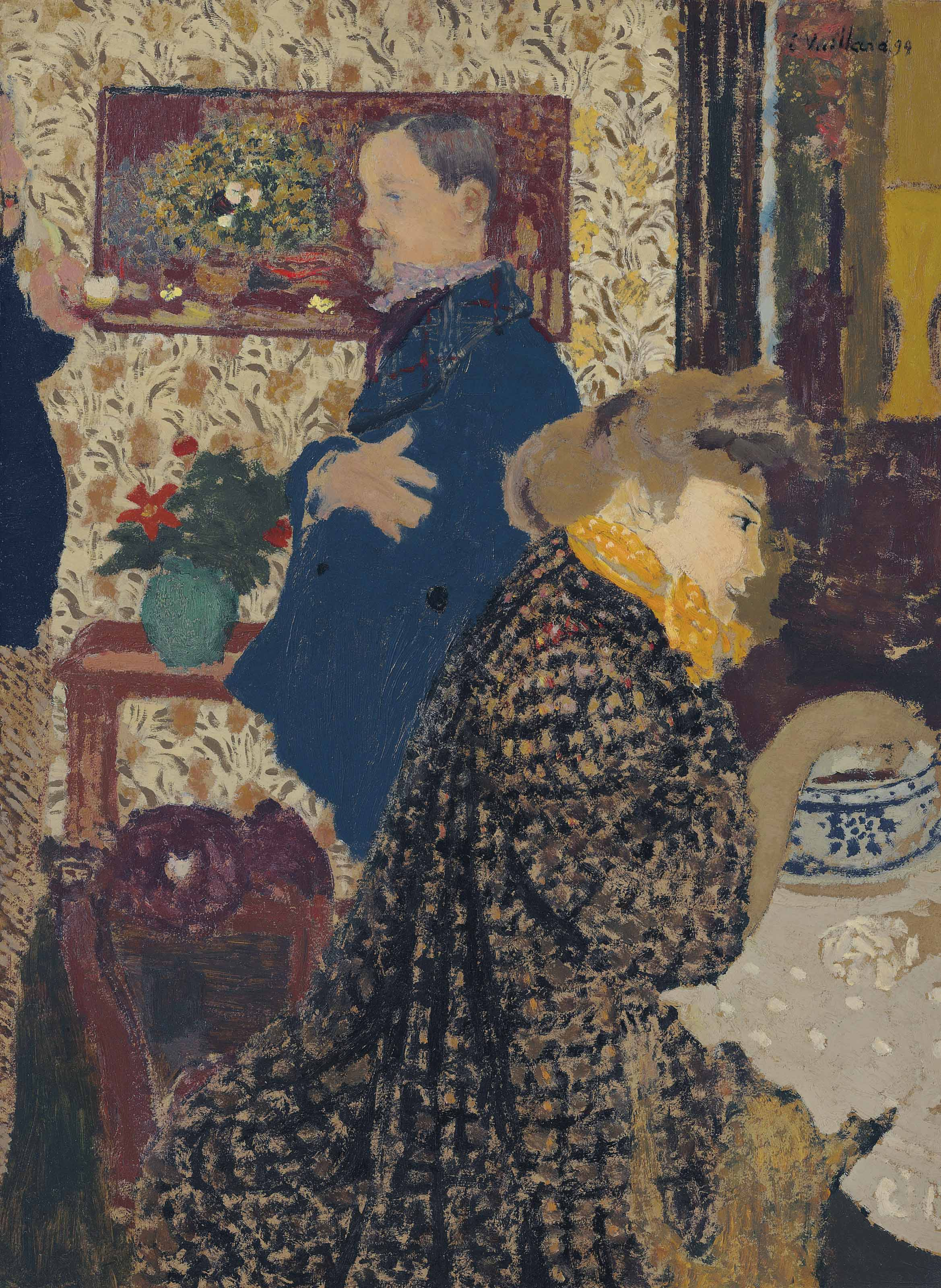
Misia and Vallotton at Villeneuve (1899) by Édouard Vuillard
