= Louis-Marie Pilet =

French cellist (1815–1877)

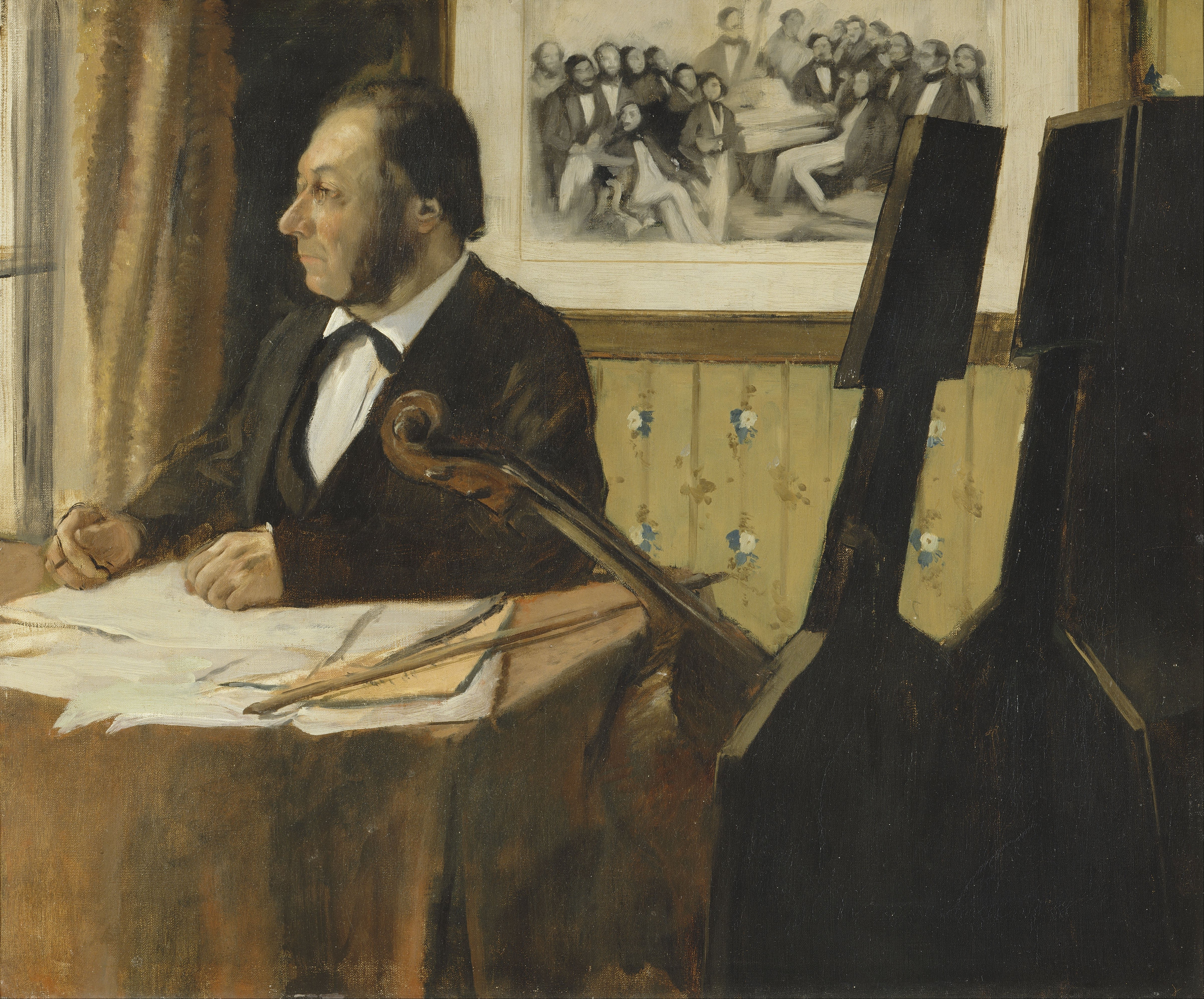
- Edgar Degas, Le Violoncelliste Pilet (1868, Musée d'Orsay)
- Born: 8 February 1815; La Guerche-de-Bretagne
- Died: 13 November 1877 (aged 62); Paris
- Occupation: Cellist

Louis-Marie Pilet (8 February 1815 – 13 November 1877) was a 19th-century French cellist.

== Biography ==
Louis-Marie Pilet studied music in Louis-Pierre Norblin's class at the Conservatoire de Paris where he gained a second prize in 1831 then a first prize in 1834.

Pilet was a cellist in the orchestras of Nantes, London and, in Paris, in the Concerts Valentino, Musard, and Théâtre italien then the Orchestre de l'Opéra national de Paris from 1852.

With Édouard Colonne as second violon and Pierre Adam as violist, he was a member of the Quatuor Lamoureux.

Edgar Degas made his portrait, Le Violoncelliste Pilet, in 1868 and showed him in:The Orchestra at the Opera (L'Orchestre de l'Opéra), behind bassoonist Désiré Dihau, circa 1870. Both paintings are kept at the musée d'Orsay.

Pilet died in Paris on 13 November 1877.

== Gallery ==
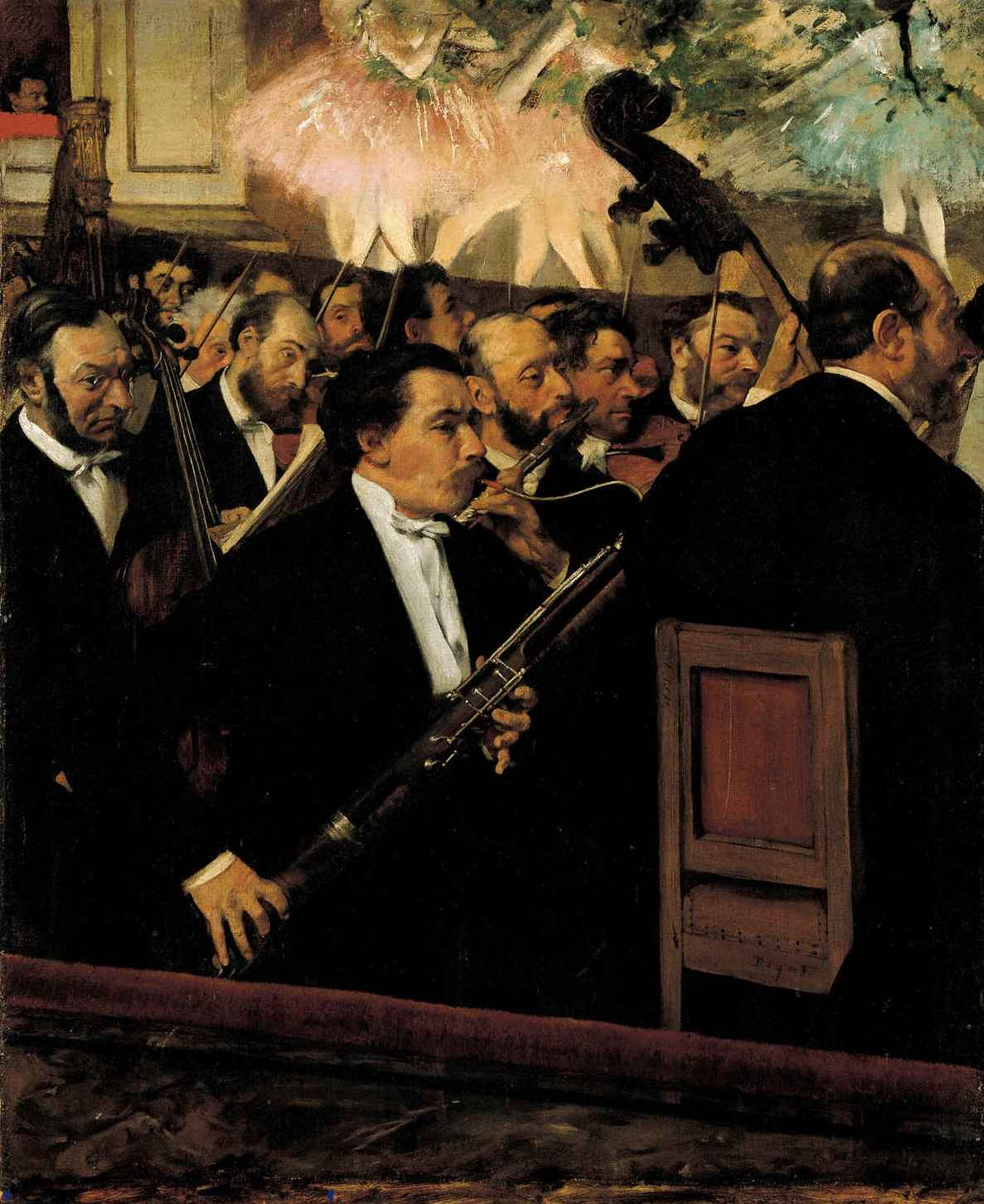
Edgar Degas, The Orchestra at the Opera (Musée d'Orsay, 1868)

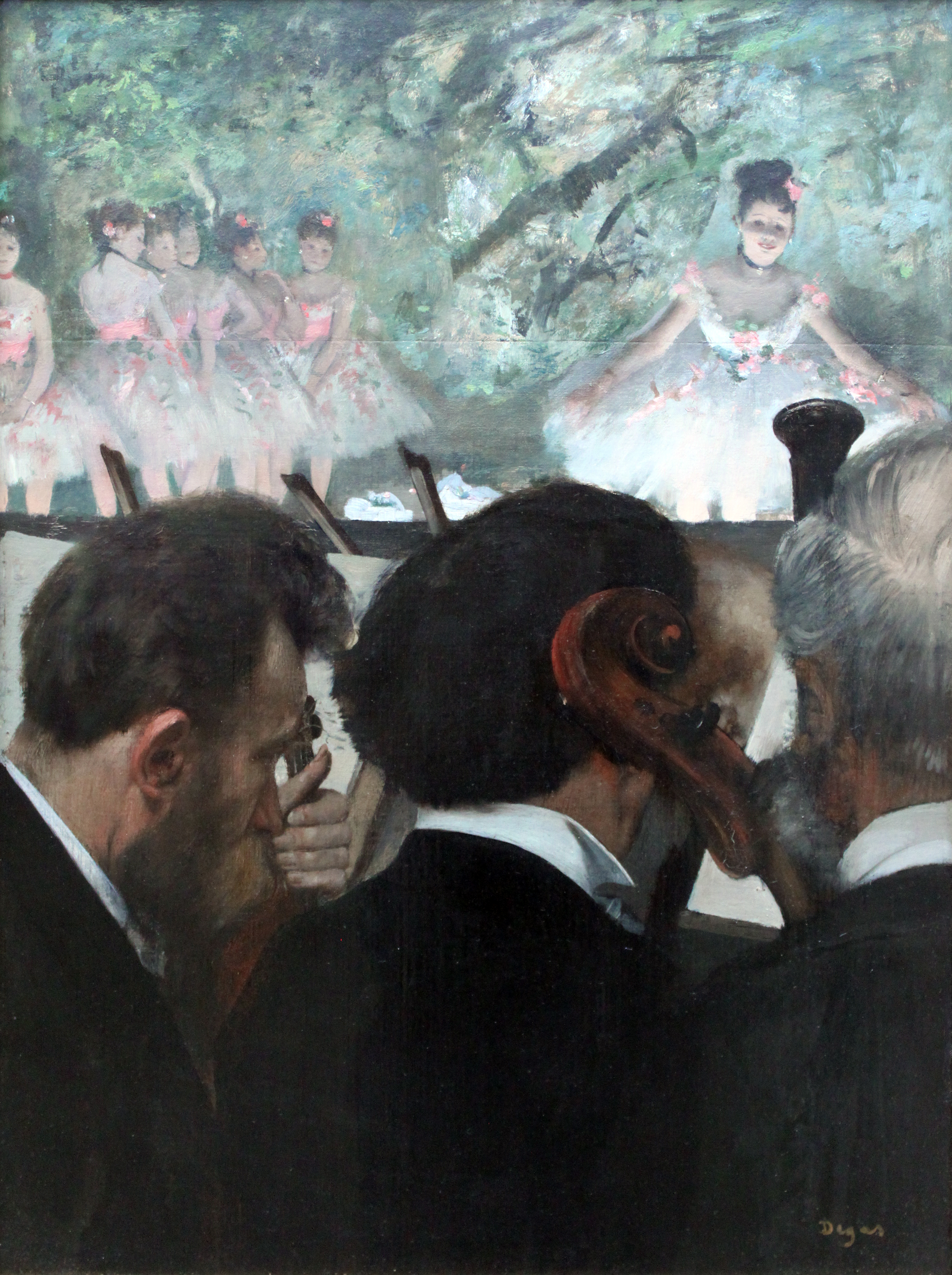
Degas, Musiciens à l'orchestre (Städel, 1872)

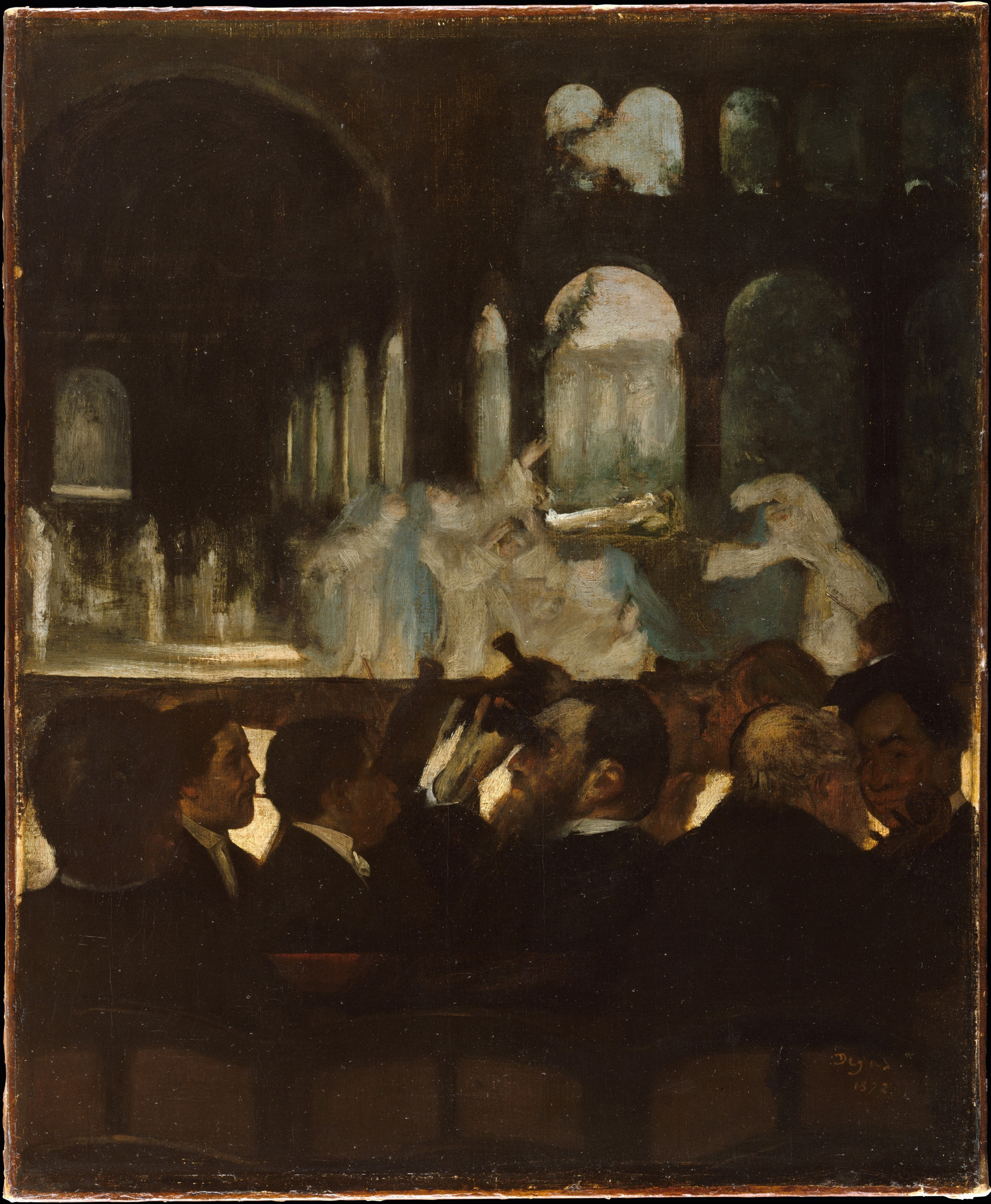
Degas, Le Ballet de « Robert le Diable » (Metropolitan Museum of Art, 1871)

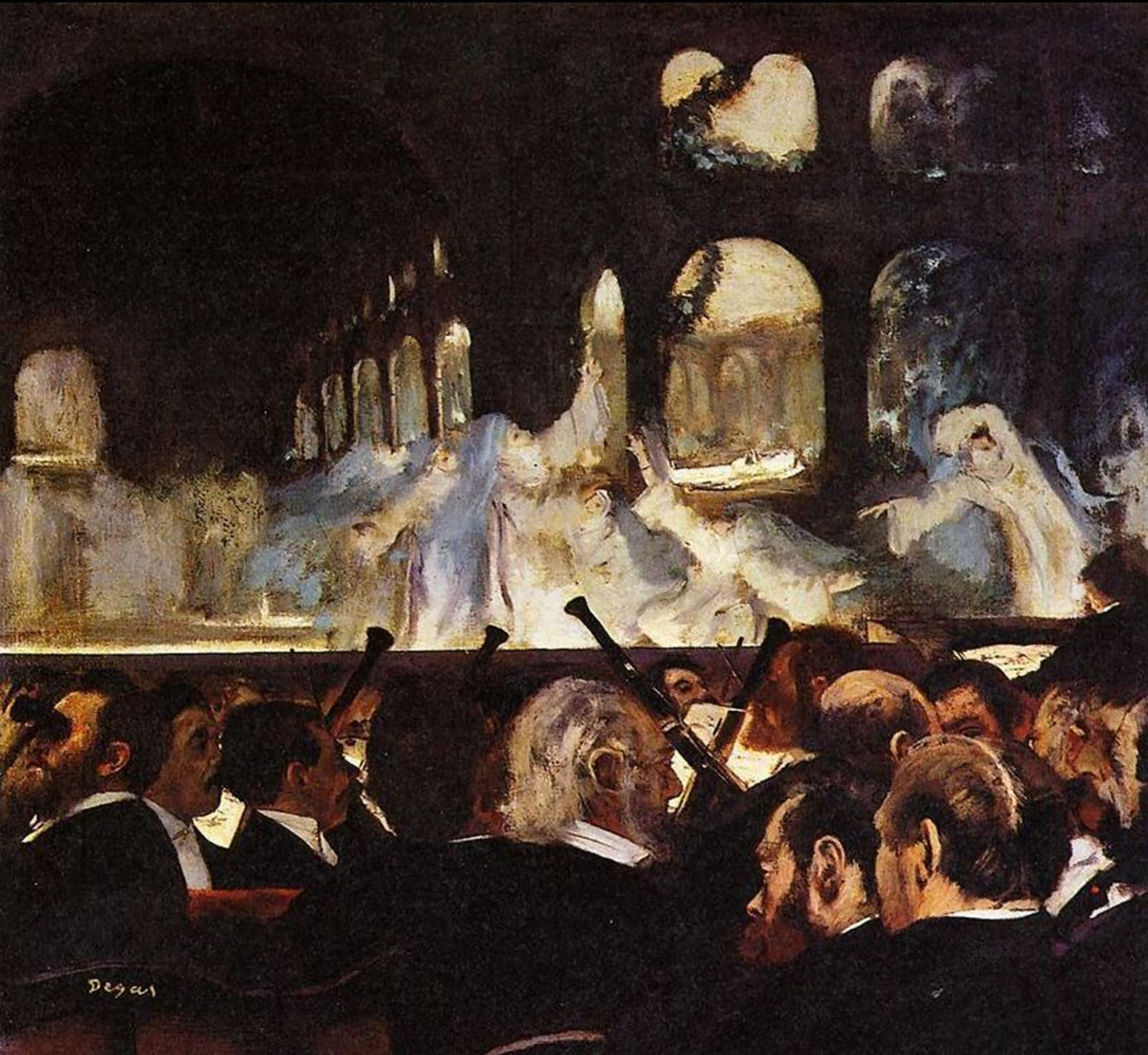
Degas, Le Ballet de « Robert le Diable » (Victoria and Albert Museum, 1876)
