= The Orchestra at the Opera =

C. 1870 painting by Edgar Degas

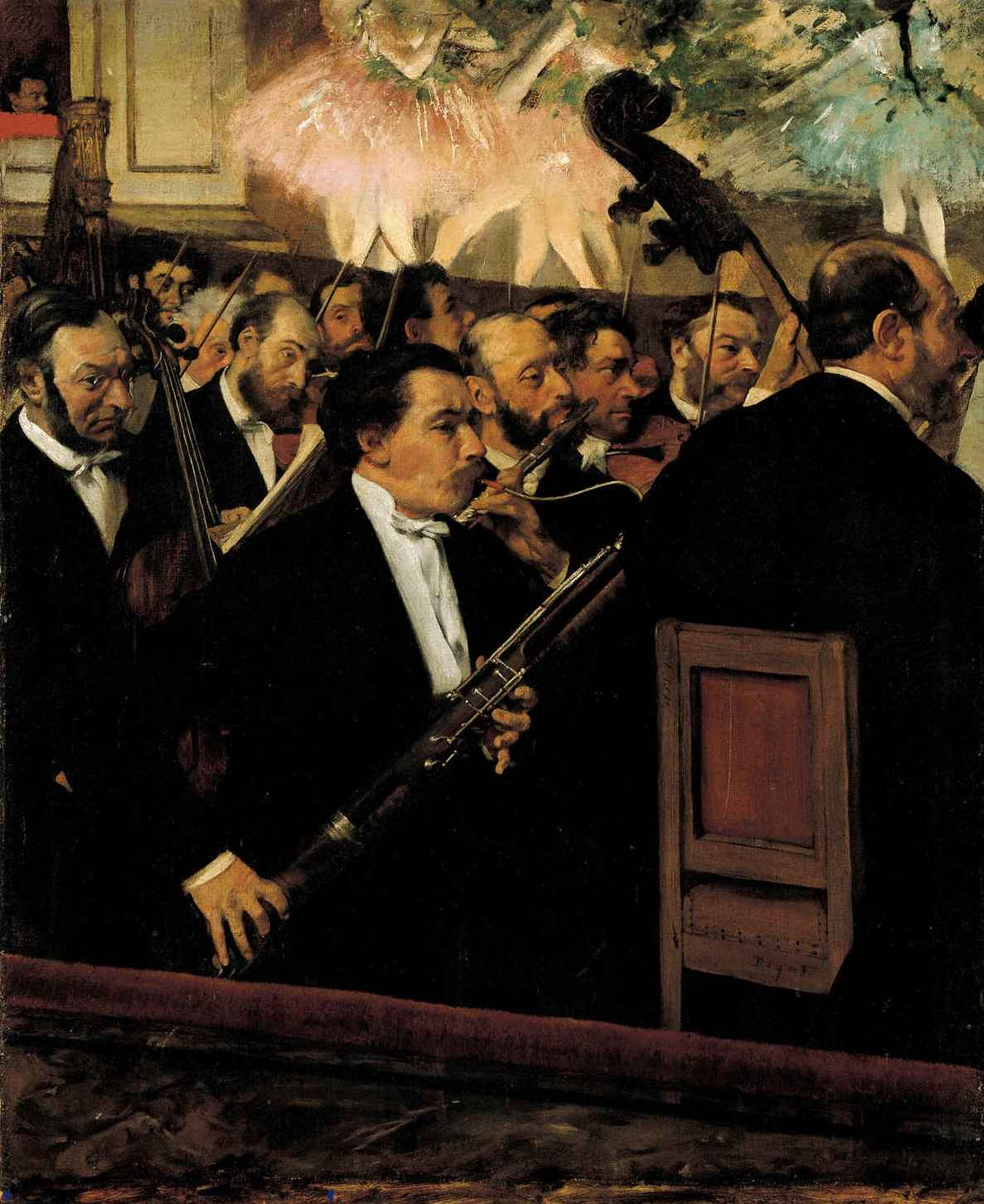
- Artist: Edgar Degas
- Year: c. 1870
- Medium: Oil on canvas
- Dimensions: 56.5 cm × 46 cm (22.2 in × 18 in)
- Location: Musée d'Orsay, Paris

The Orchestra at the Opera is an oil-on-canvas painting by the French artist Edgar Degas, from c. 1870. It is held at the Musée d'Orsay in Paris.

The musicians depicted in the orchestra pit of the Salle Le Peletier the home of the Paris Opera (from 1821 until it burnt down in 1873) are mostly portraits of friends of Degas, foremost among them pictorially the bassoonist and composer Désiré Dihau (1838–1909), who commissioned the painting, at work on his instrument, and the cellist Louis-Marie Pilet (1815–1877).

The painting was handed over, without further retouching possible, to its owner (Dihau), who exhibited it in Lille, which caused Degas' family, until then doubtful about the art of their "Raphael", to remark: "It is thanks to you that he has finally produced and completed a work, a real painting".

Blurring the distinction between portraiture and genre pieces, Degas painted his bassoonist friend, Désiré Dihau, in The Orchestra at the Opera as one of fourteen musicians in an orchestra pit, viewed as though by a member of the audience. Above the musicians can be seen only the legs and tutus of the dancers on stage, their figures cropped by the edge of the painting. Art historian Charles Stuckey has compared the viewpoint to that of a distracted spectator at a ballet, and says that "it is Degas' fascination with the depiction of movement, including the movement of a spectator's eyes as during a random glance, that is properly speaking 'Impressionist'."

The painting is the first instance in Degas' work where dancers from the ballet appear. He would depict dancers frequently for the rest of his career, and it is for his ballet pictures that he remains best known.
