= Itapucu =

16th- and 17th-century Tupinambá Indian

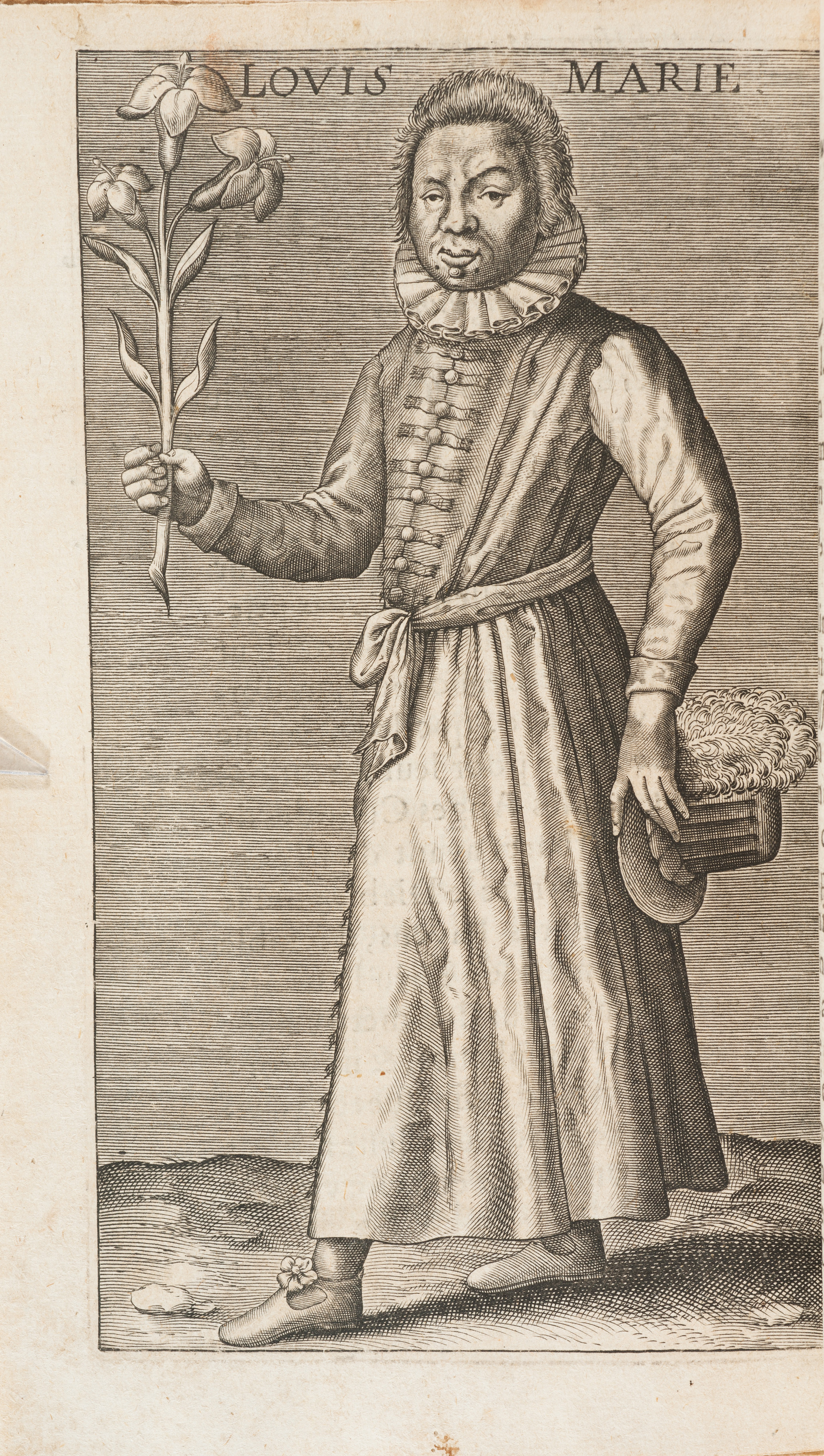
Itapucu as Louis-Marie in Claude d'Abbeville's Histoire

Itapucu (Note: In the original spelling Itapoucou) (born c. 1576) was a Tupinambá Indian from the Ibiapaba (Note: In the original spelling Ybouyäpap) mountains in Maranhão. His father, Uarauaçu, (Note: In the original spelling Ouära Ouässou) was the chief of a village. Itapucu was taken to France, where in 1614 he delivered a speech in the Tupi language to Louis XIII, his mother, and other members of the French court in the Louvre Palace. He was baptized as Louis-Marie. The name "Itapucu" means "long stone" in Tupi, from itá ("stone") and puku ("long").

== Bibliography ==
- Almeida, Geraldo Gustavo de (1988). Heróis indígenas do Brasil: memórias sinceras de uma raça [Indigenous heroes of Brazil: sincere memories of a race] (in Portuguese). Rio de Janeiro: Livraria Editora Cátedra. Archived from the original on 15 July 2024.
- d'Abbeville, Claude (1614). Histoire de la mission des pères capucins en l'île de Maragnan et terres circonvoisines [History of the mission of the Capuchin Fathers on the Island of Maranhão and neighboring lands] (in French). Paris: François Huby. Archived from the original on 15 April 2024.
- Méret, Géraldine (2014). "La « Harangue faicte au Roy par Itapoucou » : un discours politique en langue tupi (France, XVII^{e})" [The "Harangue made to the King by Itapoucou": a political discourse in the Tupi language (France, 17th century)]. Corpus (in French). 4 (2). doi:10.4000/corpusarchivos.1214. Archived from the original on 17 December 2024.
- Navarro, Eduardo de Almeida (2005). Método moderno de tupi antigo: a língua do Brasil dos primeiros séculos [Modern method of Old Tupi: the language of Brazil of the first centuries] (in Portuguese) (3rd ed.). São Paulo: Global. ISBN 978-85-260-1058-1.
- Navarro, Eduardo de Almeida (2013). Dicionário de tupi antigo: a língua indígena clássica do Brasil [Dictionary of Old Tupi: the classical indigenous language of Brazil] (in Portuguese) (1st ed.). São Paulo: Global. ISBN 978-85-260-1933-1.
