= Louis Marie Charles Hurault de Sorbée =

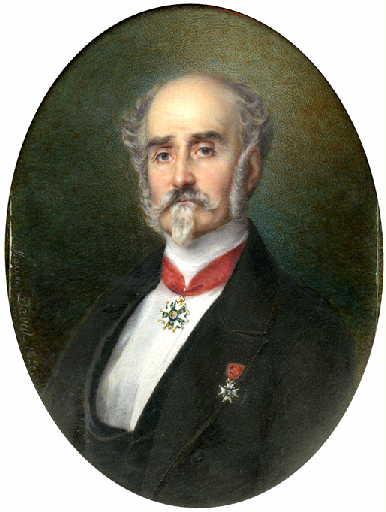

Louis Marie Charles Hurault de Sorbée (born 17 April 1786, Reims) was a French soldier. He fought at the Battle of Waterloo and the French capture of Algiers and was made a colonel of his regiment in the wake of the July Revolution.

== Sources ==
- Mullié, Charles (1852). "Hurault de Sorbée (Louis Marie Charles)" . Biographie des célébrités militaires des armées de terre et de mer de 1789 à 1850 (in French). Paris: Poignavant et Compagnie.
