= Musée Toulouse-Lautrec =

Art museum in Albi, southern France

Coordinates: 43°55′45″N 2°08′35″E

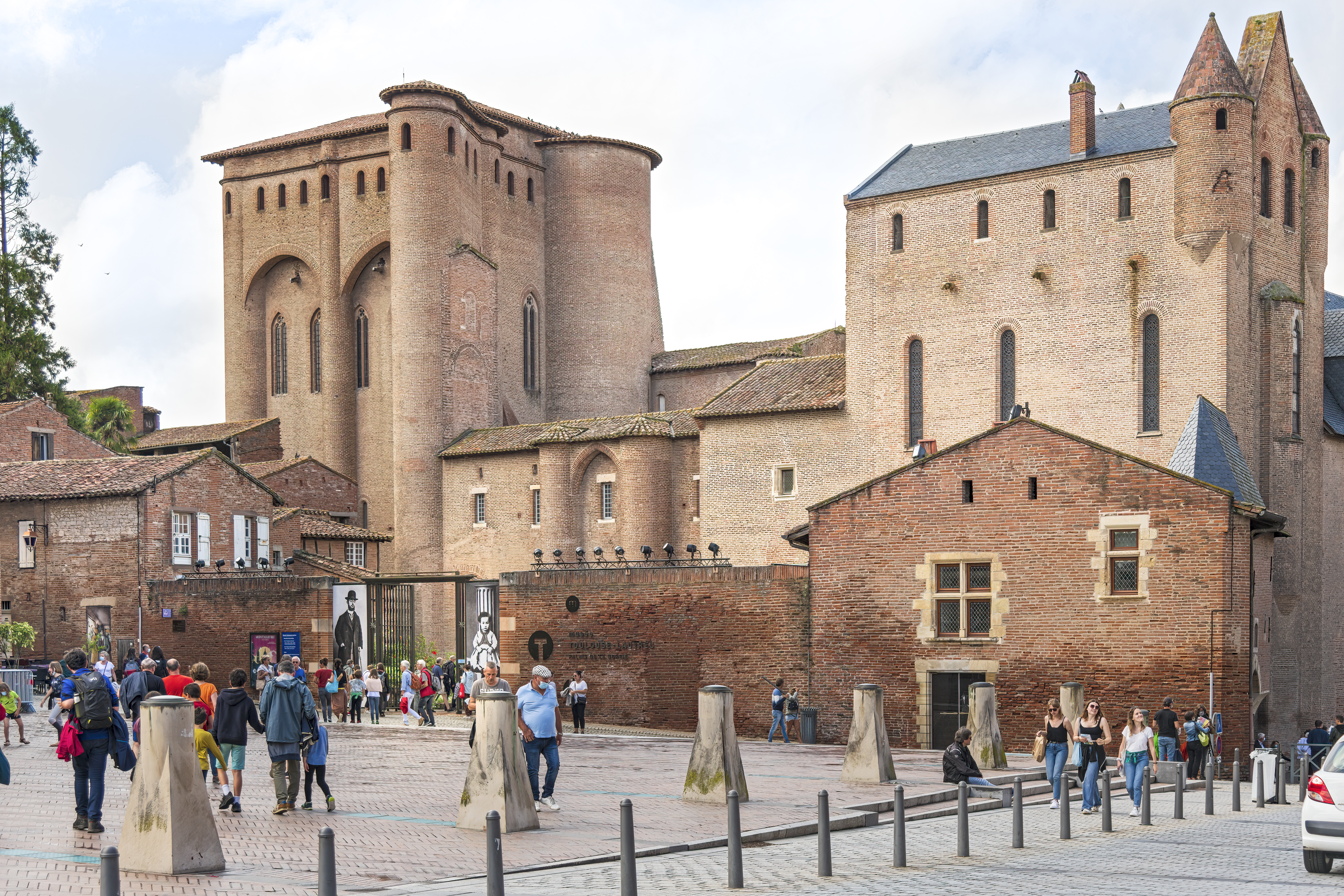
Entrance of the museum

The Musée Toulouse-Lautrec is an art museum in Albi, southern France, dedicated mainly to the work of the painter Henri de Toulouse-Lautrec who was born in Albi. The 13th-century building was originally the palace of the bishop of Albi Cathedral, which is next to the museum. Both are part of a UNESCO World Heritage Site.

== The Bishop's Palace ==
The Bishop's Palace, or Palais épiscopal de la Berbie, was originally the residence of the bishop of Albi Cathedral, located next to the museum. It is included in the same UNESCO historical site as the cathedral. The Bishop's palace was begun before the Cathedral itself, by Bishop Durand de Beaucaire (bishop from 1228–1254). It was built with the features of a fortress during the period when the Catholic Church was at war with the a heretical sect called the Cathars, which originated in Albi.

Bishop de Combret, the next resident, further fortified his palace by connecting it to the Cathedral tower, twenty-five meters away. He added bastions and a machicoulis over the entrance, to drop heavy objects or boiling water on any attackers. The next owner, Bishop De Castanet, built a new wall around it and added Saint Catherine tower, which he linked to one of the towers of the cathedral.

Later Bishops modified the palace by adding a new residence, a chapel and a French-style garden. and filled the interior with mosaics and art. In 1905, when the Cathedral and its properties were officially nationalised, and the Palace was given to the city of Albi for use as a museum.

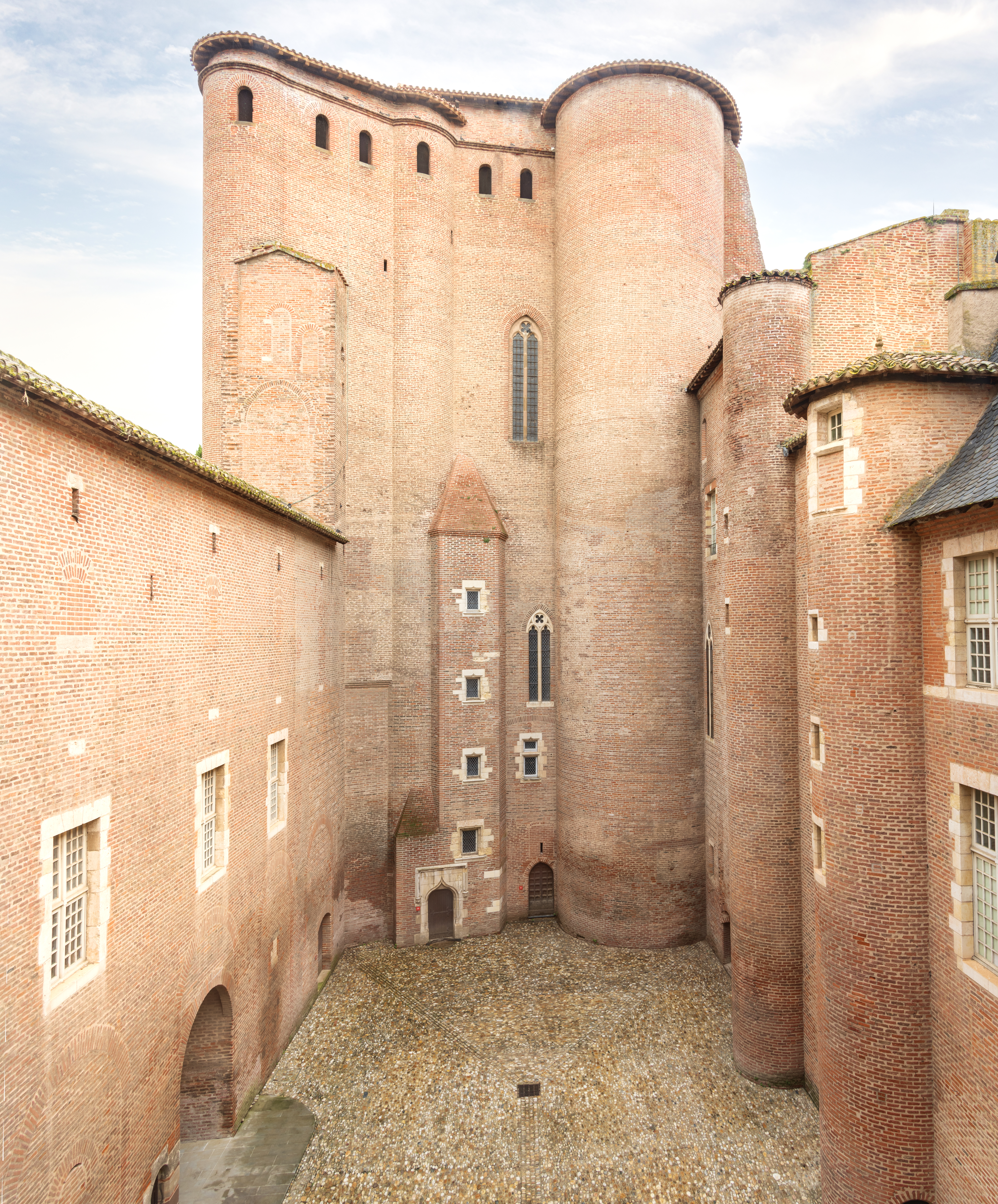
Palais de la Berbie, home of the Toulouse-Lautrec museum

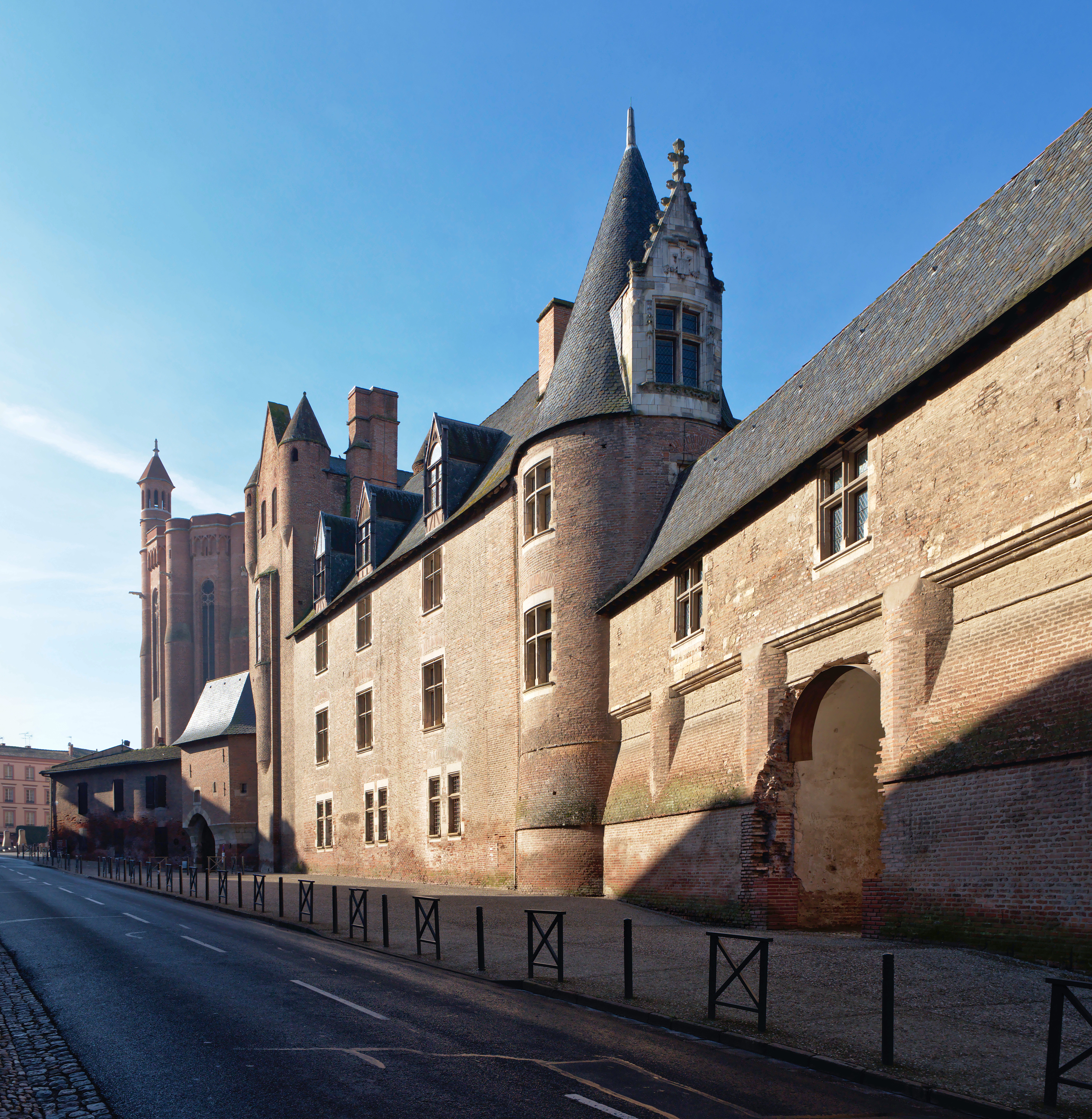
Exterior of the Palais de la Berbie

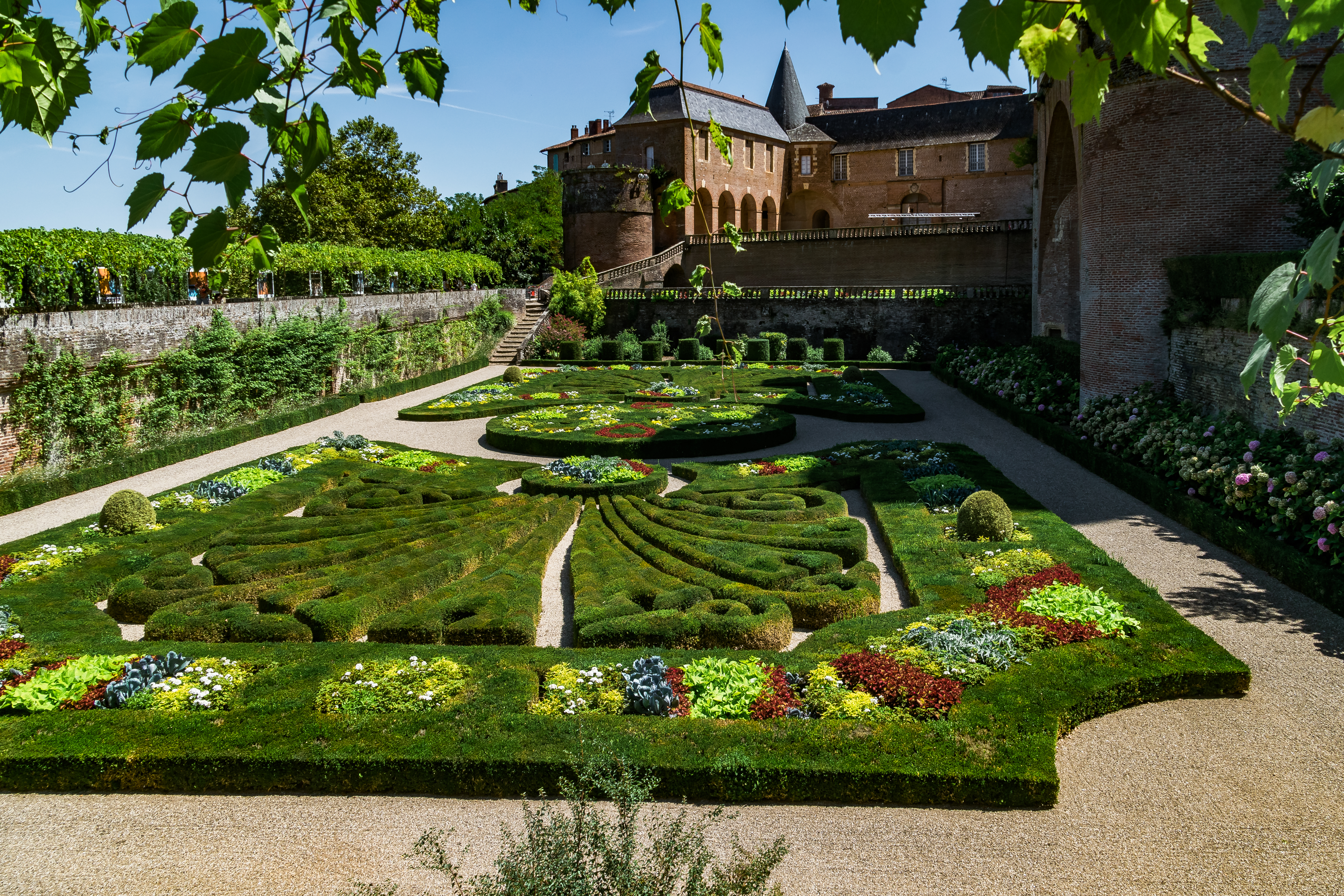
The garden of the Palais de la Berbie

== Collections ==
In 1922 the museum received an important collection of works by Henri de Toulouse-Lautrec, donated by his mother. The collection includes his last painting, Examination at the School of Medicine, from 1901.The museum houses over a thousand works by and about Toulouse-Lautrec.

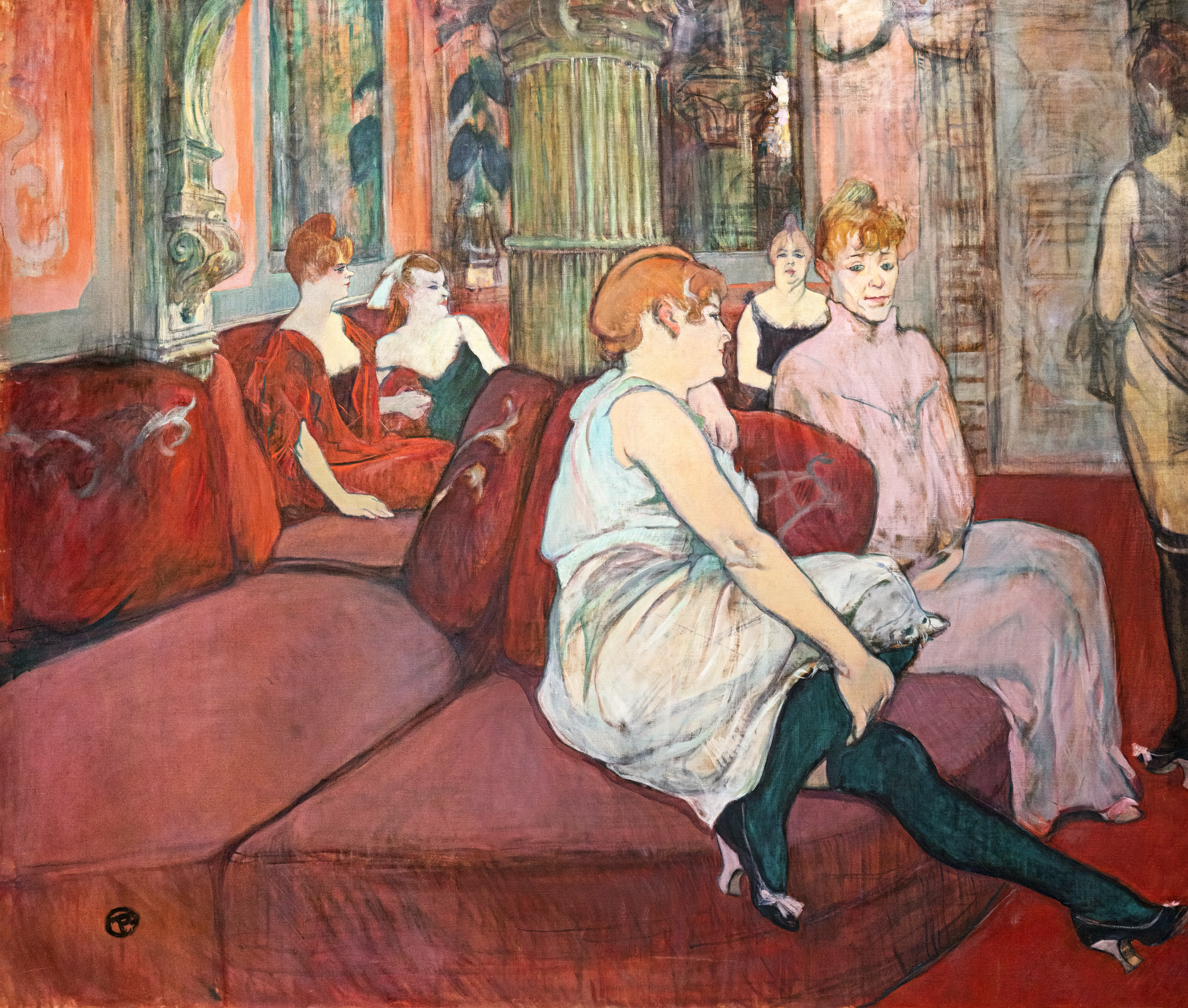
Salon in the Rue des Moulins by Toulouse-Lautrec (1894)

Toulouse-Lautrec Cooking (1898), by Édouard Vuillard

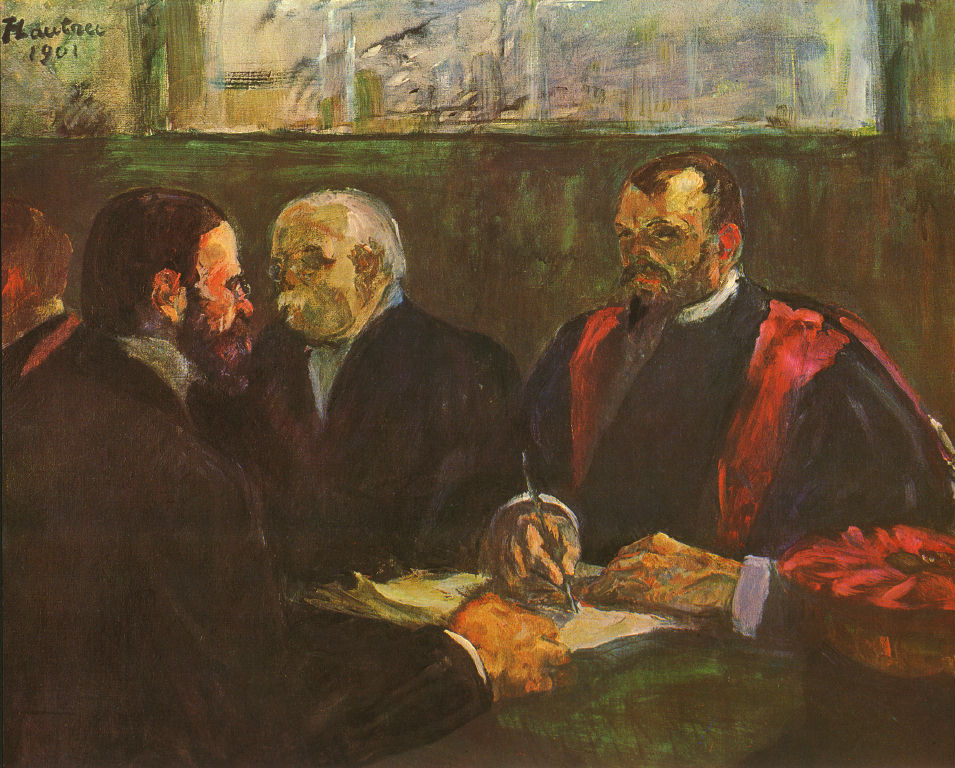
Examination at the Faculty of Medicine (1901), last painting by Toulouse-Lautrec

== See also ==
- List of single-artist museums

== Bibliography ==
- Sire, Marie-Anne (2013). Cathédrale Saint-Cécile d'Albi (in French). Centre des monuments nationaux, Éditions du patrimoine. ISBN 978-2-7577-0263-5.
