= Louis-Marie Michon =

French surgeon (1802–1866)

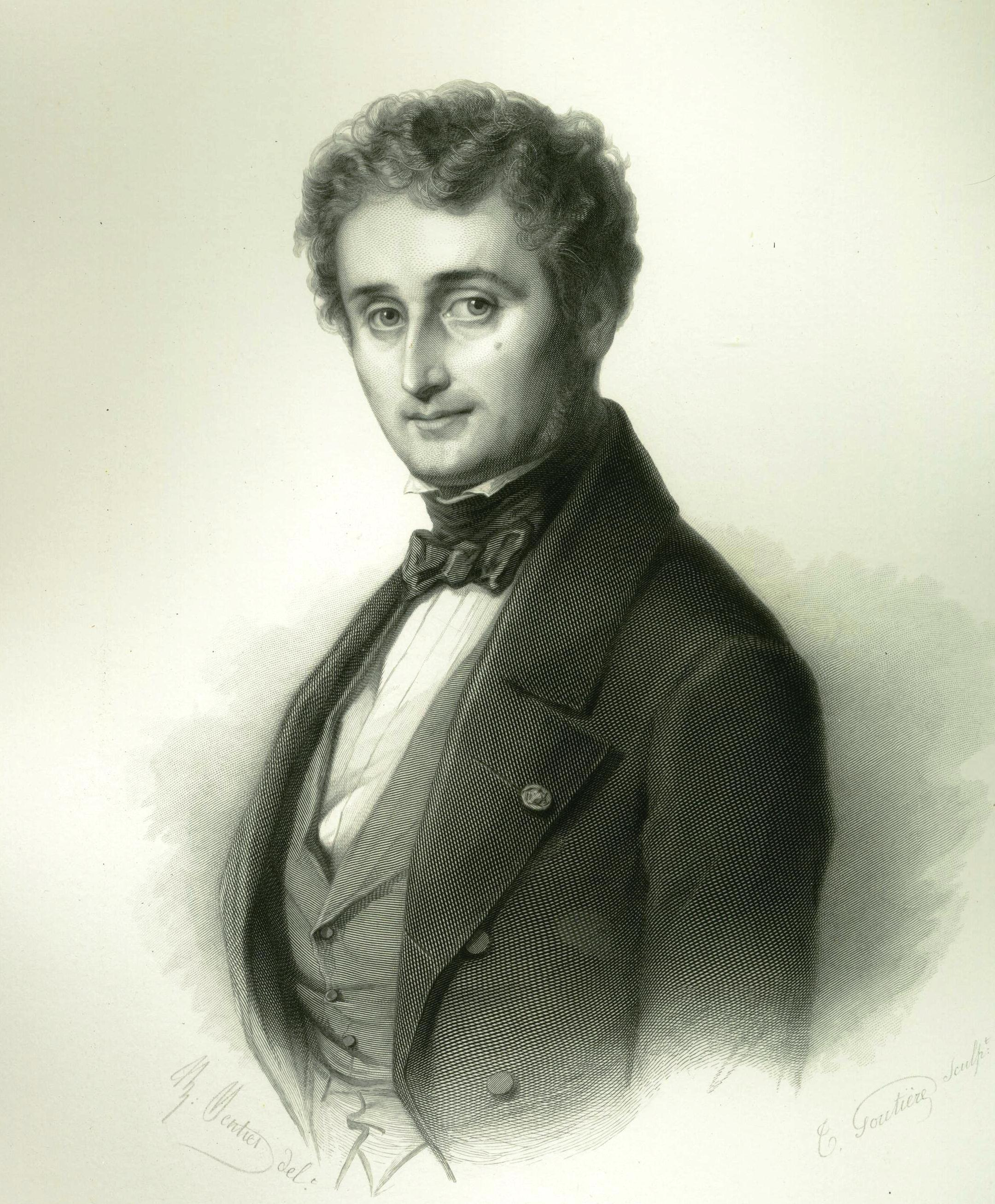
Louis-Marie Michon (1802–1866)

Louis-Marie Michon (2 November 1802 in Blanzy, Saône-et-Loire – 6 May 1866 in Paris) was a French surgeon.

He studied medicine in Paris, where in 1826 he became an interne (interne provisoire the preceding year). From 1830 he served as aide d’anatomie to the medical faculty, attaining his agrégation in surgery in 1832 with the thesis De la carie et de la nécrose. During the same year he was appointed as surgeon to the "Bureau central", followed by chirurgien des hôpitaux in 1835. As a physician, he distinguished himself during the Revolution of 1848.

In 1843 he was a founding member of the Société nationale de chirurgie (today known as Académie nationale de chirurgie), and in 1863 was admitted to the Académie de Médecine. Posthumously (1873), he was praised at the annual meeting of the Société nationale de chirurgie by Felix Guyon (1831–1920).

He was the author of an early treatise on tumors of synovial tissue titled Des tumeurs synoviales de la partie inférieure de l'avant-bras, de la face palmaire du poignet et de la main- 1851 (Synovial tumors of the lower part of the forearm, the volar wrist and hand).

He was an officer of the Légion d'Honneur, and the father of politician Joseph Michon (1836–1904). He is buried in Montcenis, Saône-et-Loire.
