= Ker-Xavier Roussel =

French painter (1867–1944)

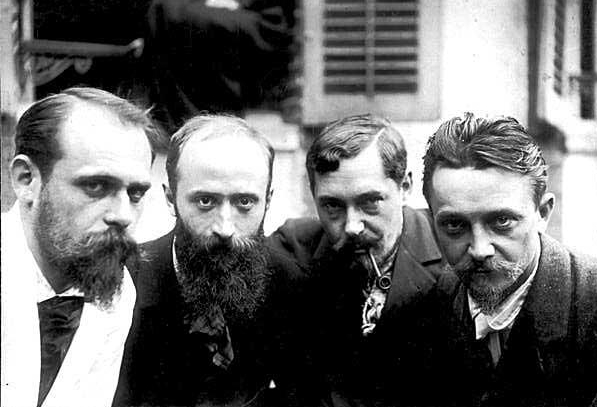
Ker-Xavier Roussel (left), Édouard Vuillard, Romain Coolus, and Félix Vallotton, 1899

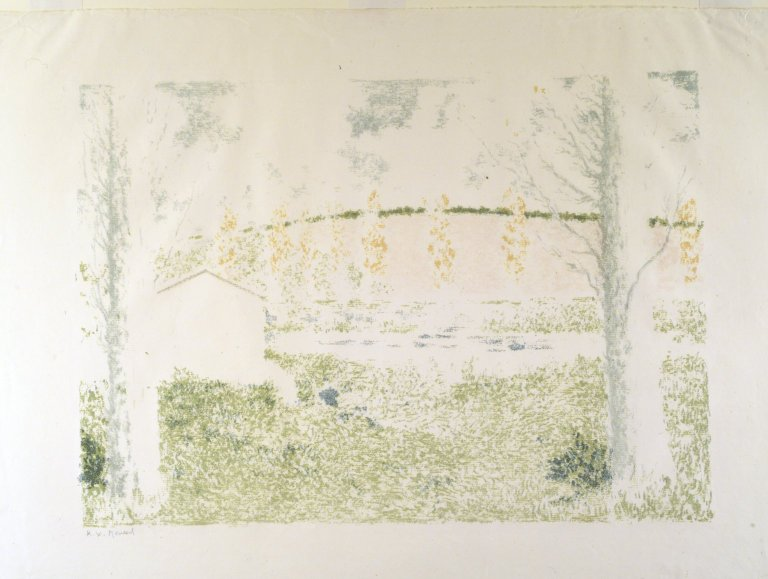
Ker-Xavier Roussel, Landscape with House, ca. 1897, chromolithograph on wove paper, 29.2 × 41.8 cm. Brooklyn Museum

Ker-Xavier Roussel (10 December 1867 – 6 June 1944) was a French painter associated with Les Nabis.

== Biography ==
Born François Xavier Roussel in Lorry-lès-Metz, Moselle in 1867, at age fifteen he studied at the Lycée Condorcet in Paris; alongside his friend Édouard Vuillard, he also studied at the studio of painter Diogène Maillart. In 1888, he enrolled in the École des Beaux-Arts, and soon began frequenting the Académie Julian where Maurice Denis and other students formed the group Les Nabis. In 1899, Roussel, Vuillard, and his close friend, Pierre Bonnard, travelled to Lake Como, Venice, and Milan. In that year he settled in L'Étang-la-Ville, Yvelines and the subject-matter of his paintings veered towards rural landscapes.

He drew his subject matter from the area around L'Étang-la-Ville and Saint-Tropez, adapting the scenery to Greek mythological episodes depicting women, children, nymphs, centaurs and fauns. His wife Marie (Vuillard's sister), his daughter Annette, his son Jacques and his grandchildren served as models. He abandoned the small format pictures typical of the Nabis and created large, brightly coloured paintings in a post-impressionist style. His paintings celebrated the seasons, abundance, drunkenness, lustful behaviour and dance, the latter influenced by Isadora Duncan. A number of paintings depict voyeuristic mythological and Old Testament episodes; one of his paintings illustrates Stéphane Mallarmé's poem of 1876, L'après-midi d'un faune, in which the faun creeps through rushes to spy on female bathers.

While Roussel expressed erotic joy in his bucolic pictures (the 'glorious blaze of the flesh'), he also had a melancholy and dark side expressed in dark lithographic illustrations to works by Maurice de Guerin, La Bacchante and Le Centaure. Between 1914 and 1917 he was admitted to a clinic, suffering from depression. He produced large numbers of pastels in his final years, between 1930 and 1944, picturing violent death in mythology.

Roussel is known for huge paintings of landscapes decorating public spaces, with others commissioned for private clients. In 1912 he painted the front curtain of the Théâtre des Champs-Élysées and in 1937-9 he created a huge eleven-metre panel in the debating chamber at the Palais des Nations (Palace of Nations) in Geneva. In 1926, Ker-Xavier Roussel won the Carnegie Prize for art. His reputation reached a peak in 1936 with a multi-panel scheme for the Palais de Chaillot.

Ker-Xavier Roussel died in 1944 at his home in L'Étang-la-Ville.

Roussel is mentioned in Gertrude Stein's Autobiography of Alice B. Toklas, Chapter 3. There she recounts an exchange he had with Theodore Duret in Vollard's shop at an uncertain date after 1904. Roussel complained of the lack of recognition that he and the other Nabi painters had to contend with. Duret consoled him by pointing out his incompatibility with the manners and fashions of the bourgeois world and the differences between "art" and "official art".

In 2019 he was rescued from the near oblivion into which he has generally fallen in modern times by a comprehensive exhibition, Ker-Xavier Roussel, Private Garden, Dreamed Garden at the Musée des Impressionnismes, Giverny.

== Selected paintings ==
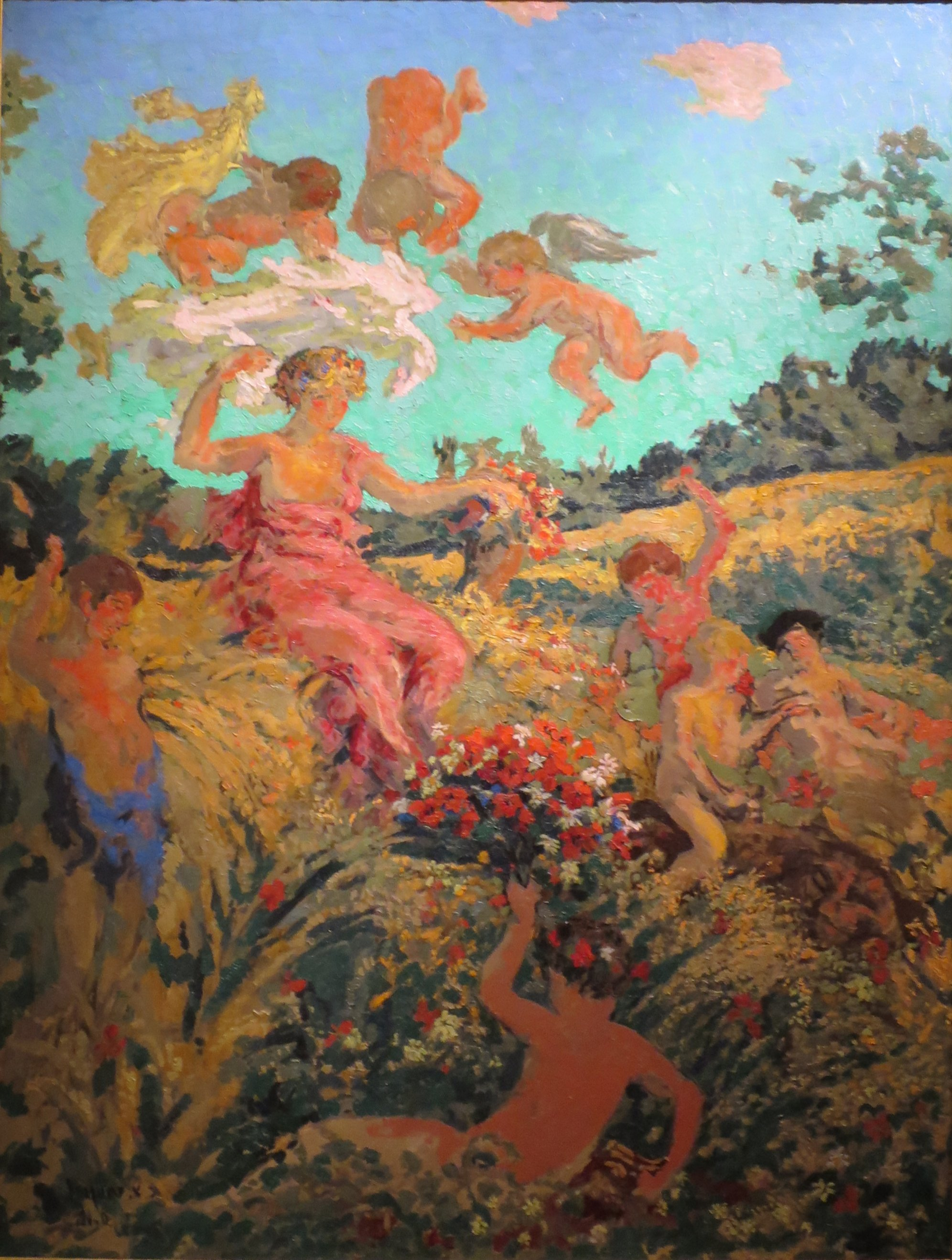
Rural Festival, Summer

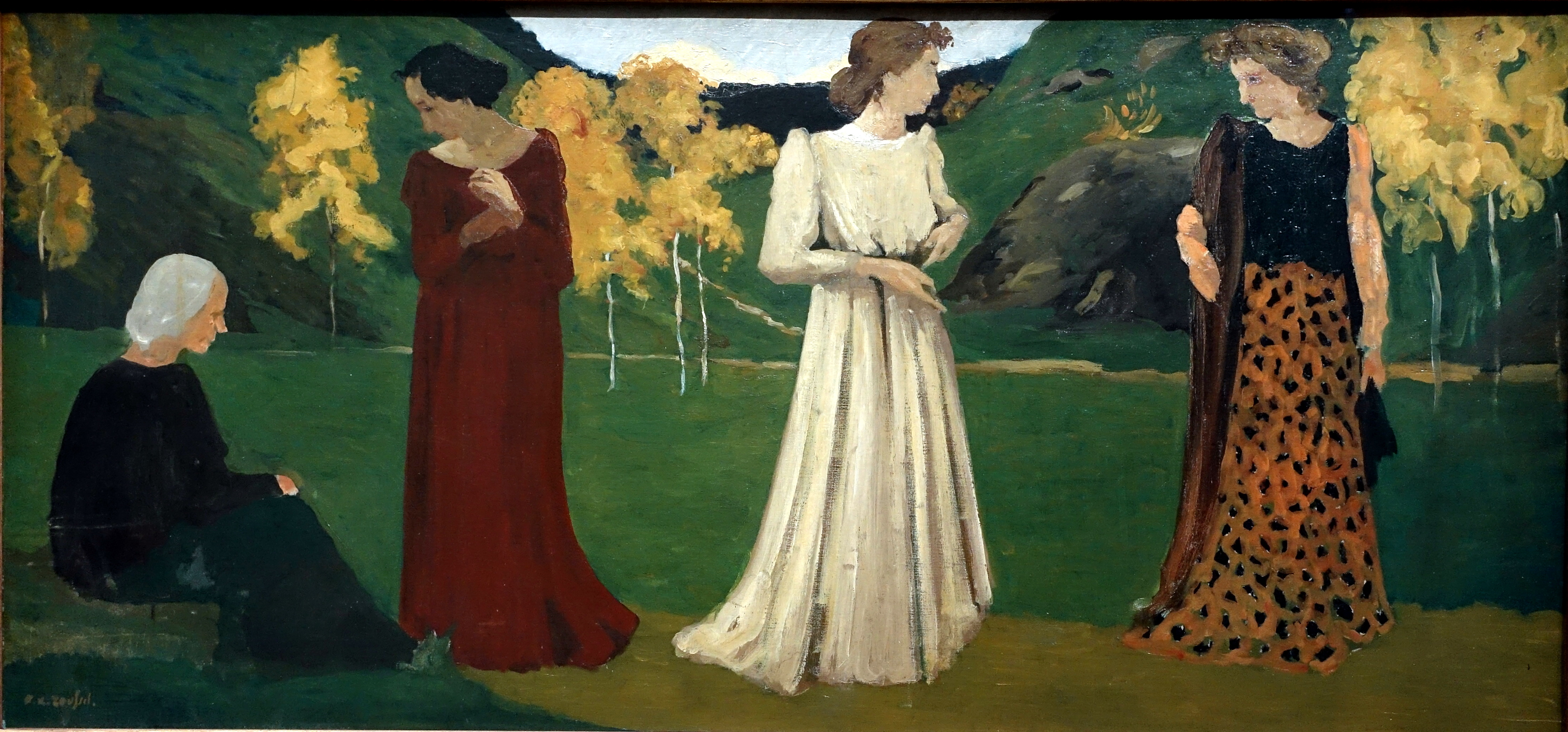
The Seasons of Life

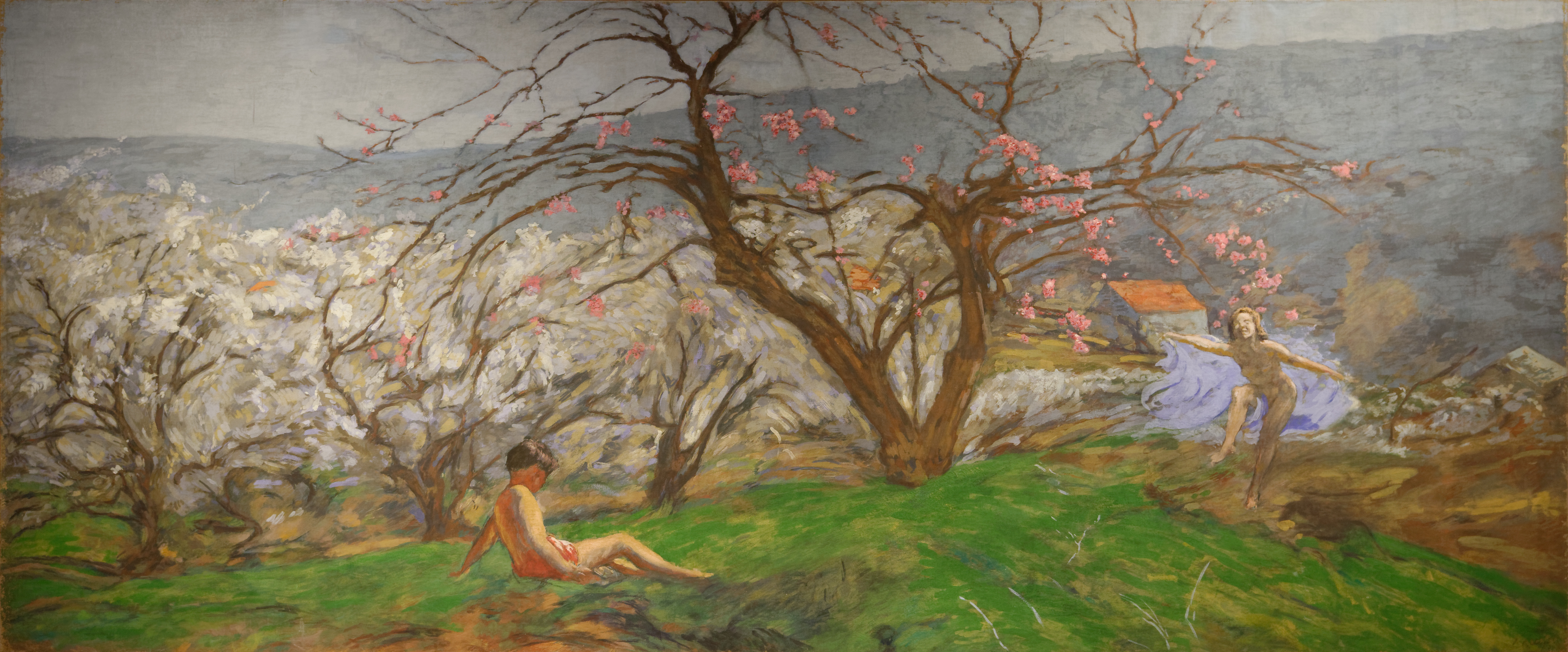
Women in a Landscape, Île-de-France

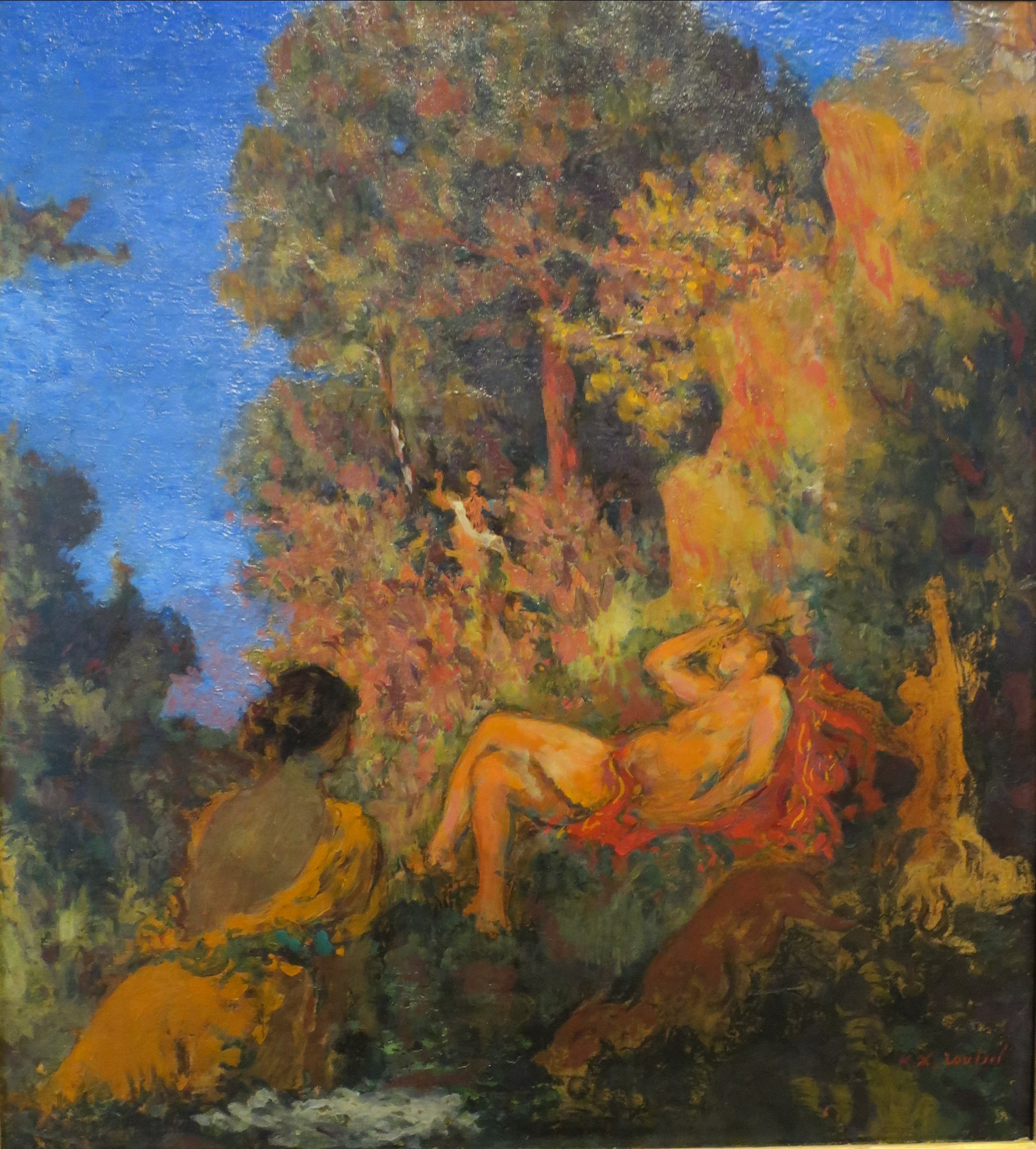
The Sleeping Diana
