= Nabis (art) =

French artists

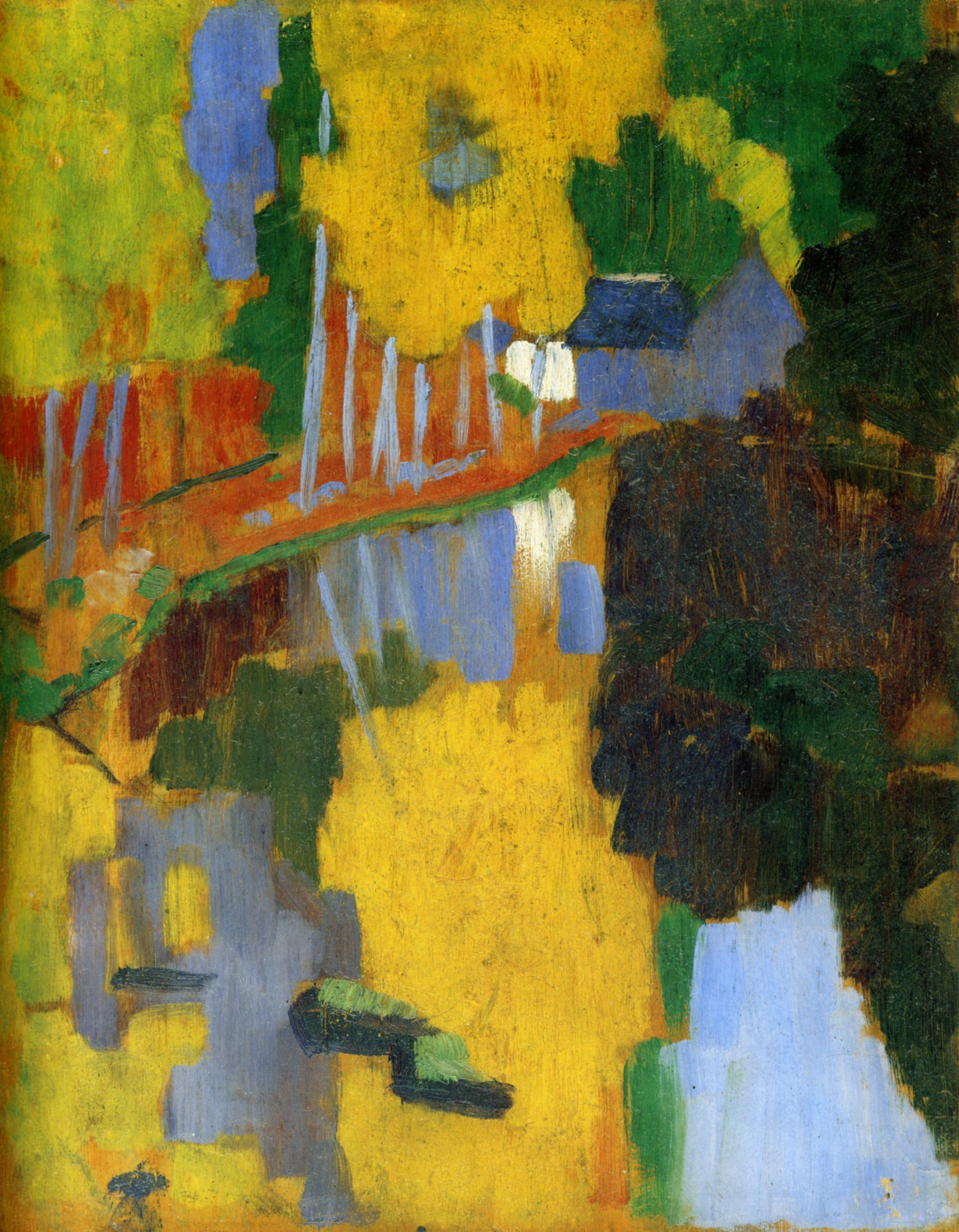
The first Nabis painting, by Paul Sérusier, Le Bois d'Amour à Pont-Aven or Le Talisman, 1888, oil on wood, 27 x 21.5 cm, Musée d'Orsay, Paris

The Nabis (French: les nabis, French pronunciation: [le nabi]) were a group of young French artists active in Paris from 1888 until 1900, who played a large part in the transition from Impressionism and academic art to abstract art, symbolism and the other early movements of modernism. The members included Pierre Bonnard, Maurice Denis, Paul Ranson, Édouard Vuillard, Ker-Xavier Roussel, Félix Vallotton, Paul Sérusier and Auguste Cazalis. Most were students at the Académie Julian in Paris in the late 1880s. The artists shared a common admiration for Paul Gauguin and Paul Cézanne and a determination to renew the art of painting, but varied greatly in their individual styles. They believed that a work of art was not a depiction of nature, but a synthesis of metaphors and symbols created by the artist. In 1900, the artists held their final exhibition and went their separate ways.

== Etymology ==
The Nabis took their name from a Hebrew term which comes from the word nebiim or "prophets". (Note: The French term nabi (also used in English), referring to a person inspired to speak the word of God, is clearly related to the Hebrew term for prophet – נביא (navi) mentioned frequently in the Hebrew Bible – and the similar Arabic word نَبِيّ (nabiyy).) The term was coined in 1888 by the linguist Auguste Cazalis, who drew a parallel between the way these painters aimed to revitalize painting (as 'prophets of modern art') and the way the ancient prophets had rejuvenated Israel.

== Beginning ==
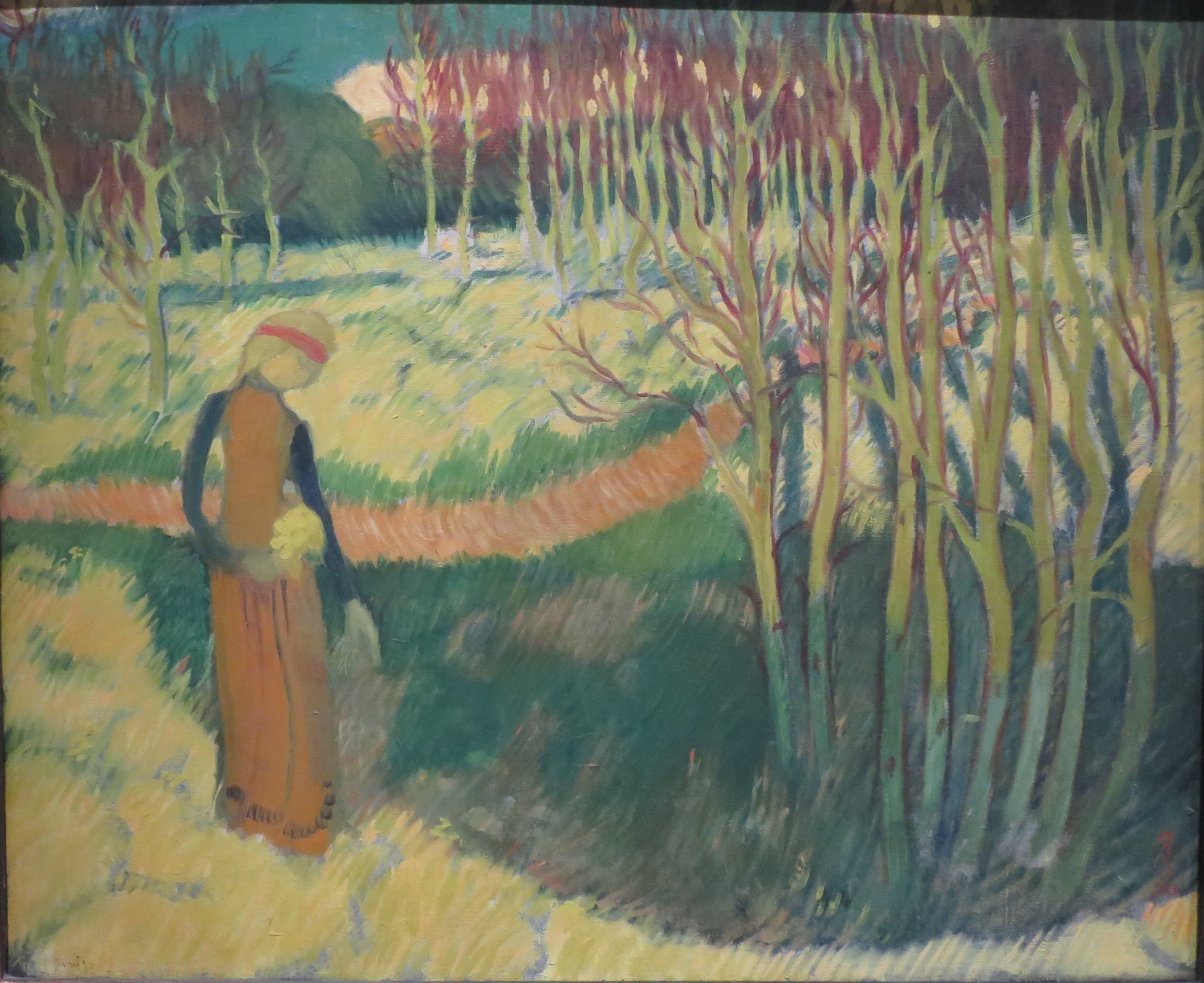
Motif Romanesque by Maurice Denis (1890), one of the earliest Nabi paintings

The Nabis were a group of young artists of the Académie Julian in Paris, who wanted to transform the foundations of art. One of the artists, Paul Sérusier, had traveled to Pont-Aven in October 1888, where under the guidance of Paul Gauguin he made a small painting of 'The Bois d'Amour'(The forest of love) on wood, composed of patches of vivid color. The students called this first Nabis painting The Talisman, and it eventually became an icon of 20th-century art.

In 1889, the same year of the Paris International Exposition and the opening of the Eiffel Tower, the group held its first modest exposition at the Café des Arts, which was located without the grounds of the Exposition. It was titled The Impressionist and Synthesist Group, and included works by two well-known artists, Paul Gauguin and Émile Bernard.

In August 1890, Maurice Denis, then nineteen years old, gave the group a more concrete philosophy. Writing under the name Pierre Louis, he wrote an article in the journal Art et Critique entitled The Definition of Neo-traditionalism, which became the manifesto of the movement. The celebrated opening line of the essay was: "Remember that a picture, before being a battle horse, a female nude or some sort of anecdote, is essentially a flat surface covered with colors assembled in a certain order." This idea was not original to Denis; the idea had been put forward not long before by Hippolyte Taine in The Philosophy of Art, where Taine wrote: "A painting is a colored surface, in which the various tones and various degrees of light are placed with a certain choice; that is its intimate being." However, it was the expression of Denis which seized the attention of artists. As Denis explained, he did not mean that the form of the painting was more important than the subject. He wrote, "The profoundness of our emotions comes from the sufficiency of these lines and these colors to explain themselves...everything is contained in the beauty of the work." In his essay, he termed this new movement "neo-traditionalism", in opposition to the "progressivism" of the Neo-impressionists, led by Seurat.

The following year, in 1891, three of the Nabis, Pierre Bonnard, Édouard Vuillard and Maurice Denis, took a studio at 28 rue Pigalle in Paris. It was frequented by other early Nabis, including Ker-Xavier Roussel and Paul Sérusier, as well as journalists and figures from the theatrical and literary world.

In 1892, the Nabis branched out into the theatrical world and the decorative arts. Paul Ranson, assisted by Sérusier, Bonnard, and Vuillard, designed sets for a theatrical presentation of the Bateau ivre of the poet Arthur Rimbaud. Maurice Denis made costumes and sets for another theatrical production, the Trilogy d'Antoina at the Théatre Moderne, and also painted a ceiling for the residence of the art collector and painter Henry Lerolle.

The Nabis held a group exhibition in Toulouse in June 1894, and the following year presented their work in Siegfried Bing's Maison de l'Art Nouveau, the famous gallery which had given its name to the Art Nouveau movement.

Throughout their existence the Nabis were a sort of half-serious semi-secret society, who used humorous nicknames and a private vocabulary. Even the name of the group was secret until 1897. They called a studio an 'ergasterium' and ended their letters with the initials E.T.P.M.V. et M.P., signifying En ta paume, mon verbe et ma pensée ("In your palm, my word and my thoughts").

== Japanese influence ==
The graphic art of Japan, known as Japonism, particularly woodblock prints, was an important influence on the Nabis. The style was popularized in France by the art dealer Siegfried Bing, who traveled to Japan to collect prints by Hokusai and other Japanese artists, and published a monthly art journal, Le Japon Artistique, between May 1888 and April 1891, which offered color illustrations. In 1900 he organized an exhibit of seven hundred prints at the École des Beaux-Arts.

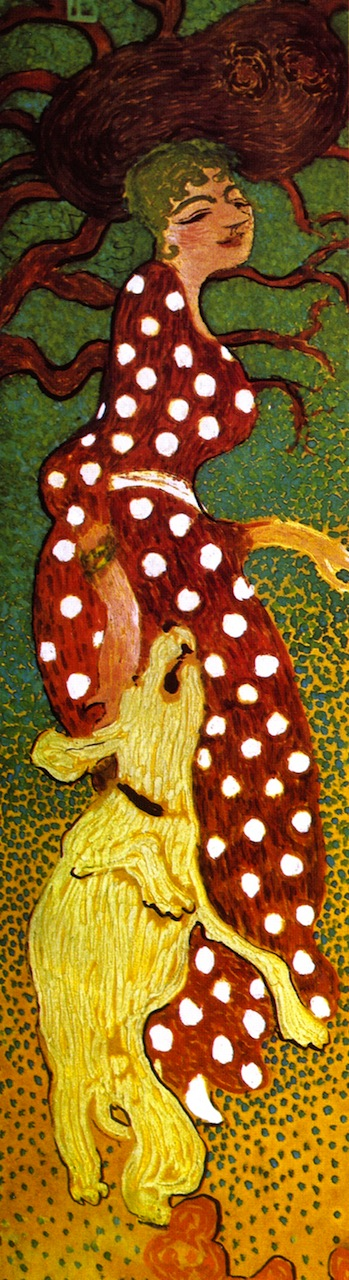
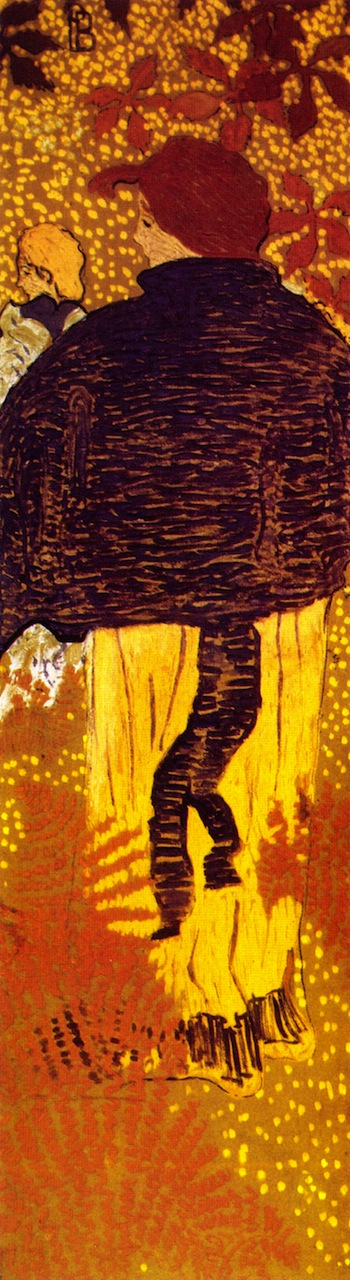
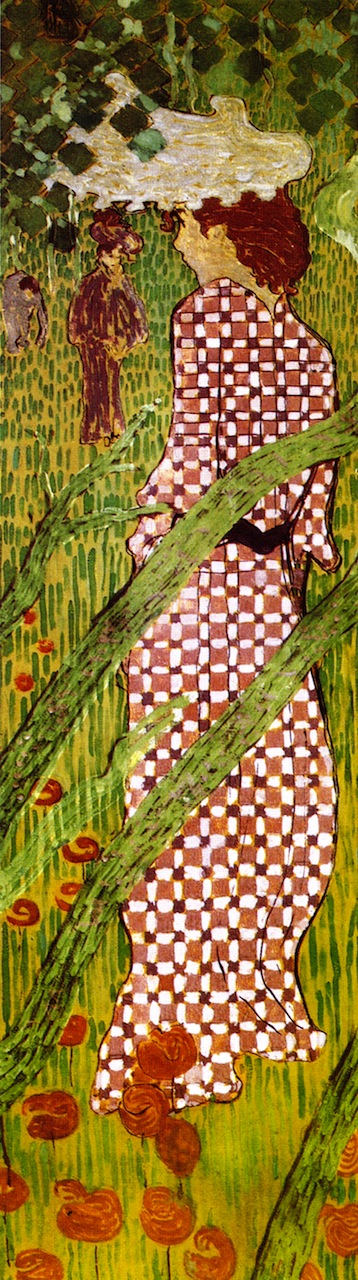
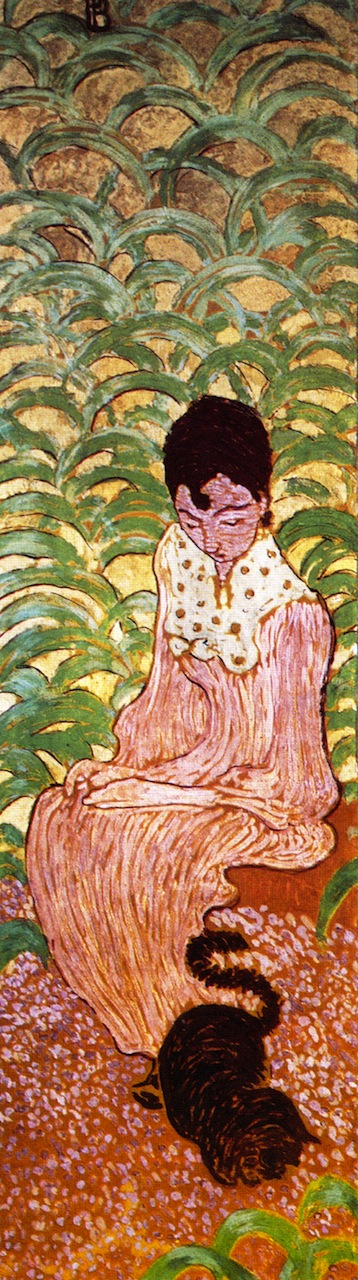
Pierre Bonnard, The Women in the Garden, 1890–91, Musée d'Orsay

Pierre Bonnard was particularly influenced by the Japanese style; his nickname among the Nabis was "Le plus japonard". For one series of four paintings created in 1890–91, The Women in the Garden, now in the Musée d'Orsay, Bonnard adapted a Japanese format called kakemono with a narrow vertical canvas. The models are his sister Andrée and his cousin Berthe Schaedin. The four figures are presented in curving, serpentine postures, like those in Japanese prints. The faces of the women look away from the artist; the bold patterns of their costumes and the foliage behind them dominate the paintings. He originally conceived the work as a Japanese screen, but he finally decided to separate it into four paintings, and to emphasize the decorative aspect, he added a painted border around the canvases.

The theme of women in a garden, stylistically adapted from Japanese prints, appeared in the work of other Nabis, including Maurice Denis and Paul Sérusier. Denis used the theme of women in gardens in paintings and decorative murals. Sérusier adapted the same format in his Women at the Spring (1898), stylistically depicting women descending a hill to take water from a spring.

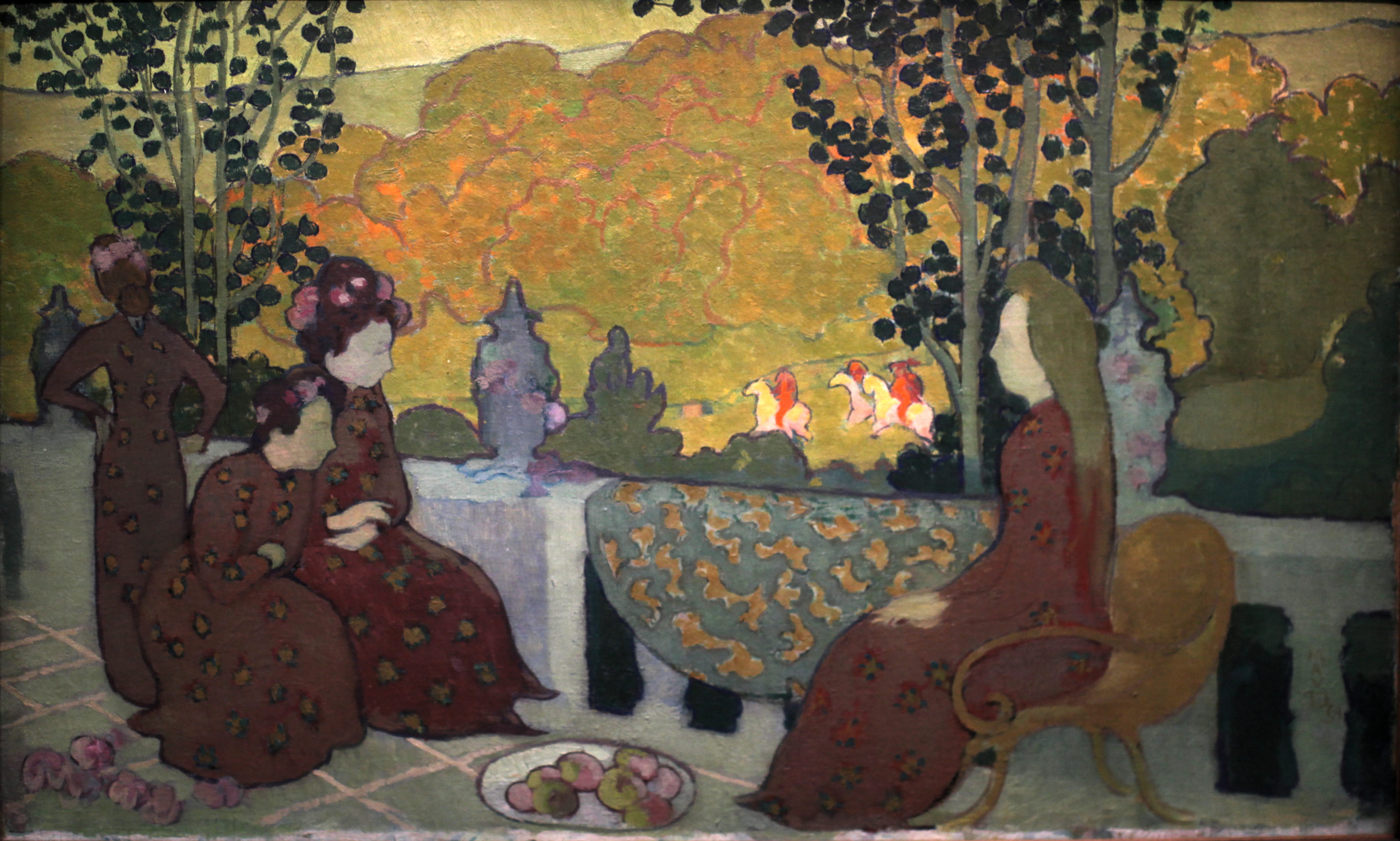
Maurice Denis, Evening in September (1891)

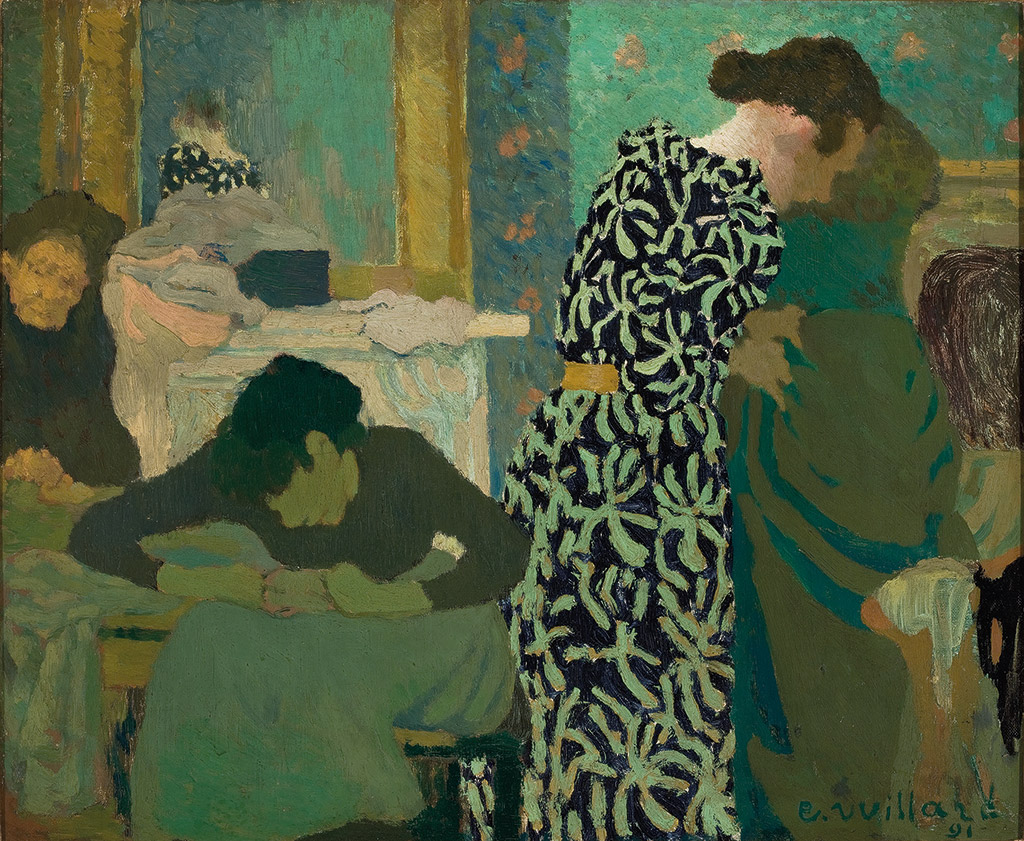
The printed dress by Édouard Vuillard (1891), Museu de Arte de São Paulo

== Religion, symbolism, myths and legends ==
The Nabis were influenced by the literature, music and theater of the symbolist movement, and, among some of the Nabis, there was a strong current of mysticism and esotericism. Their approach to their order was partly humorous and whimsical; the studio of Ranson at 25 Boulevard du Montparnasse was called their "temple", Madame Ranson was termed "The light of the Temple", and the original Nabi painting by Sérusier was displayed in the studio like a shrine, and titled The Talisman. Sérusier whimsically painted Paul Ranson in a sort of Nabic robe, with a staff and a text before him. However, they also had a more serious side. They rejected the materialism of the new industrial age, and admired the poetry of Baudelaire, Mallarmé and Edgar Allan Poe. They placed themselves in opposition to the current of naturalism expressed in the paintings of Courbet and Manet and the literature of Émile Zola.

Maurice Denis and Paul Sérusier were the Nabis who most often painted religious subjects. The work of Denis was influenced by the paintings of Fra Angelico. He often painted scenes and themes taken from the Bible, but with the figures in modern costume, in simplified landscapes and surrounded by light, a symbol of faith. In 1895, he received a commission for a series of seven large paintings called The Legend of Saint Hubert for the Paris home of Baron Cochin. They illustrated the story of Saint Hubert hunting in the forest of Aquitaine, seeing a vision of Christ, and being converted to Christianity.

Paul Sérusier painted less Christian and more mystical scenes, particularly La Vision pros du torrent or The rendezvous of fairies (1897), showing a group of women in Breton costumes passing through the forest, carrying bouquets of flowers to a ceremony, and Femmes à la Source, depicting a series of women solemnly descending through a mystical forest to a spring. This illustrates the legend of the Danaides, who in mythology were condemned to fill and refill leaking jugs of water from a spring. He painted several works of women in Breton costumes conducting pagan ceremonies in the forests of Brittany.

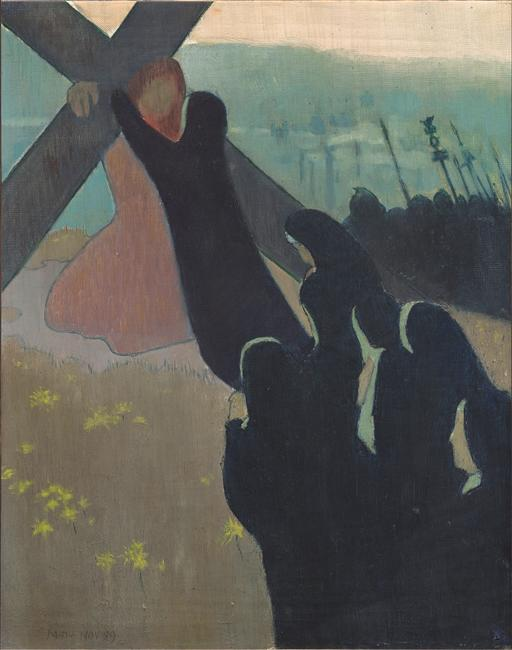
Maurice Denis, Le Calvaire (Climbing to Calvary) (1889), Musée d'Orsay

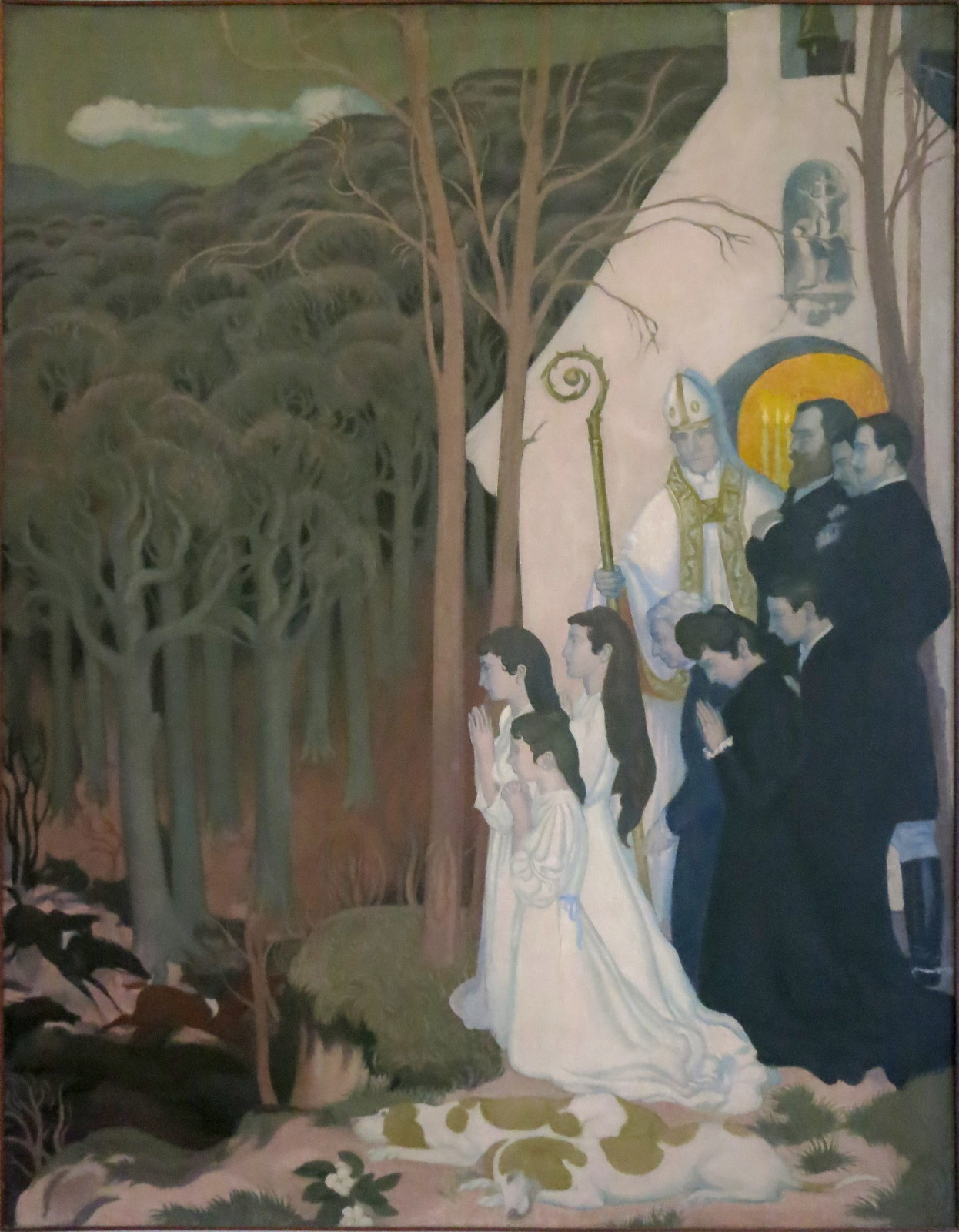
Maurice Denis, Final scene of the Legend of Saint Hubert (1897), Departmental Museum of Maurice Denis, Saint-Germain-en-Laye (1897)

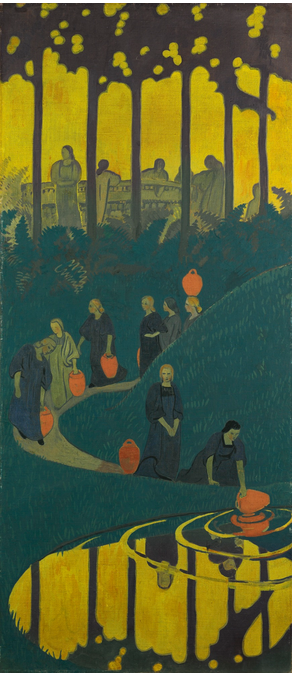
Paul Sérusier, Women at the Spring, Musée d'Orsay (1898)

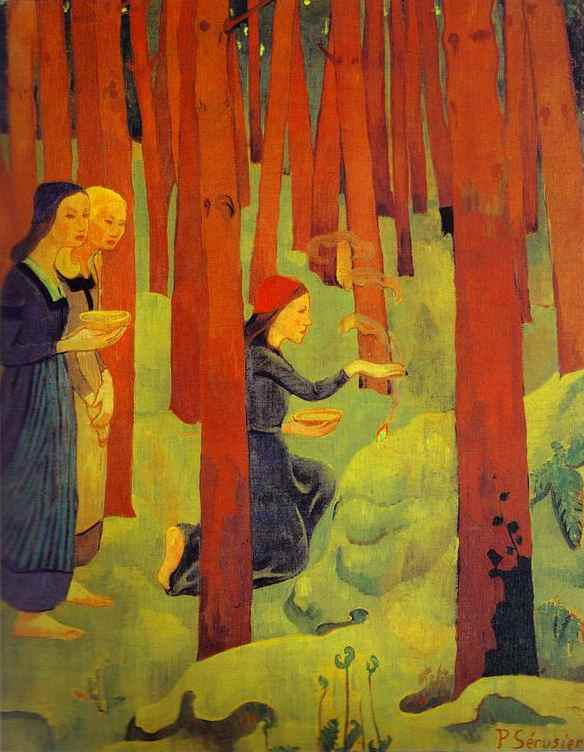
Paul Sérusier, The Sacred Woods

== Interiors ==
The Nabis Pierre Bonnard, Félix Vallotton and Édouard Vuillard created particularly remarkable paintings depicting the interiors of homes, where the inhabitants of the rooms were almost entirely absorbed into the intense floral decoration and furnishings. In some of the paintings, such as Vuillard's The Seamstress and La Table de toilet (1895), or People in an Interior - Music, it is difficult to even find and count the individuals in the painting.

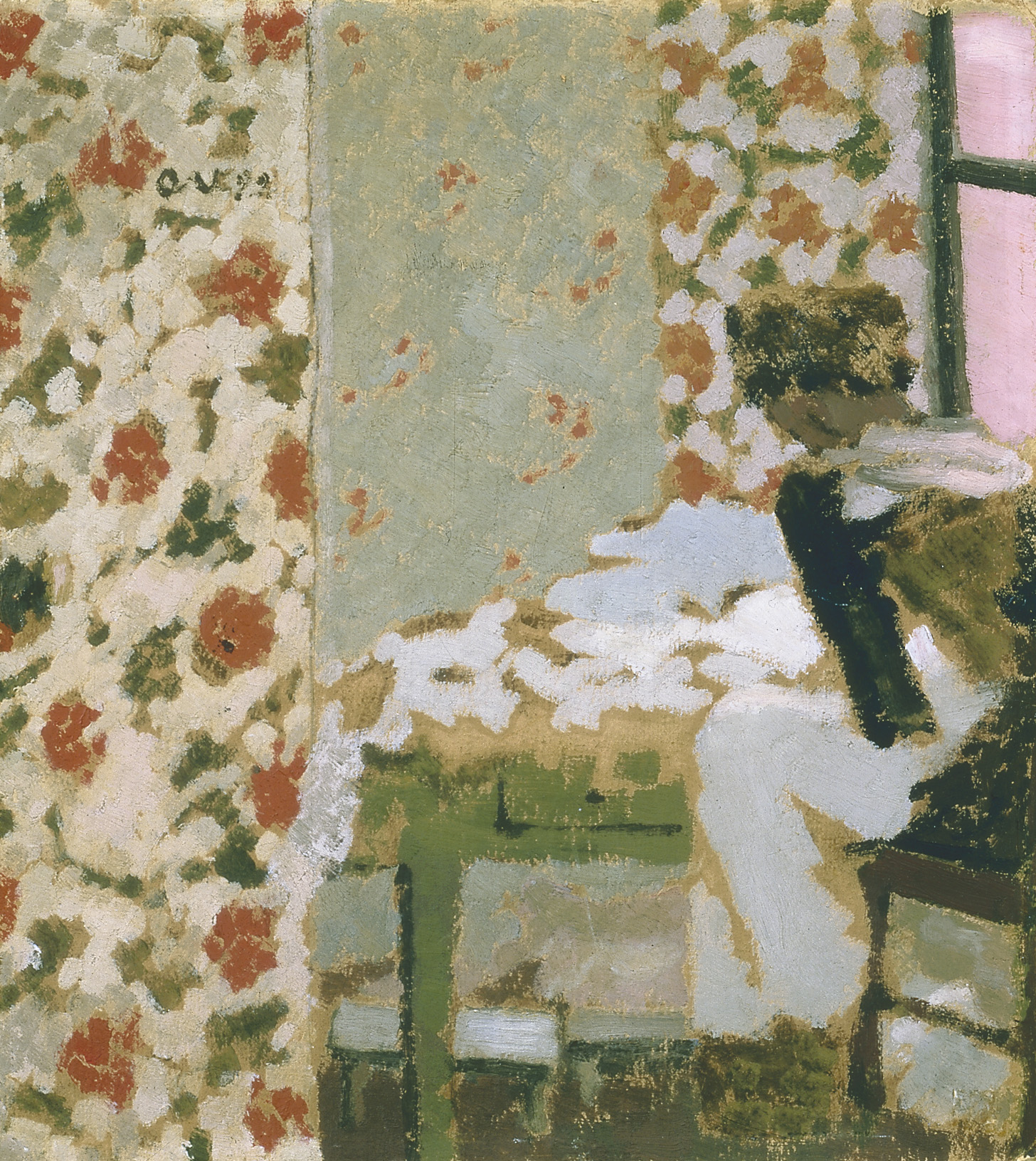
Édouard Vuillard, The Seamstress, (1893), Indianapolis Museum of Art

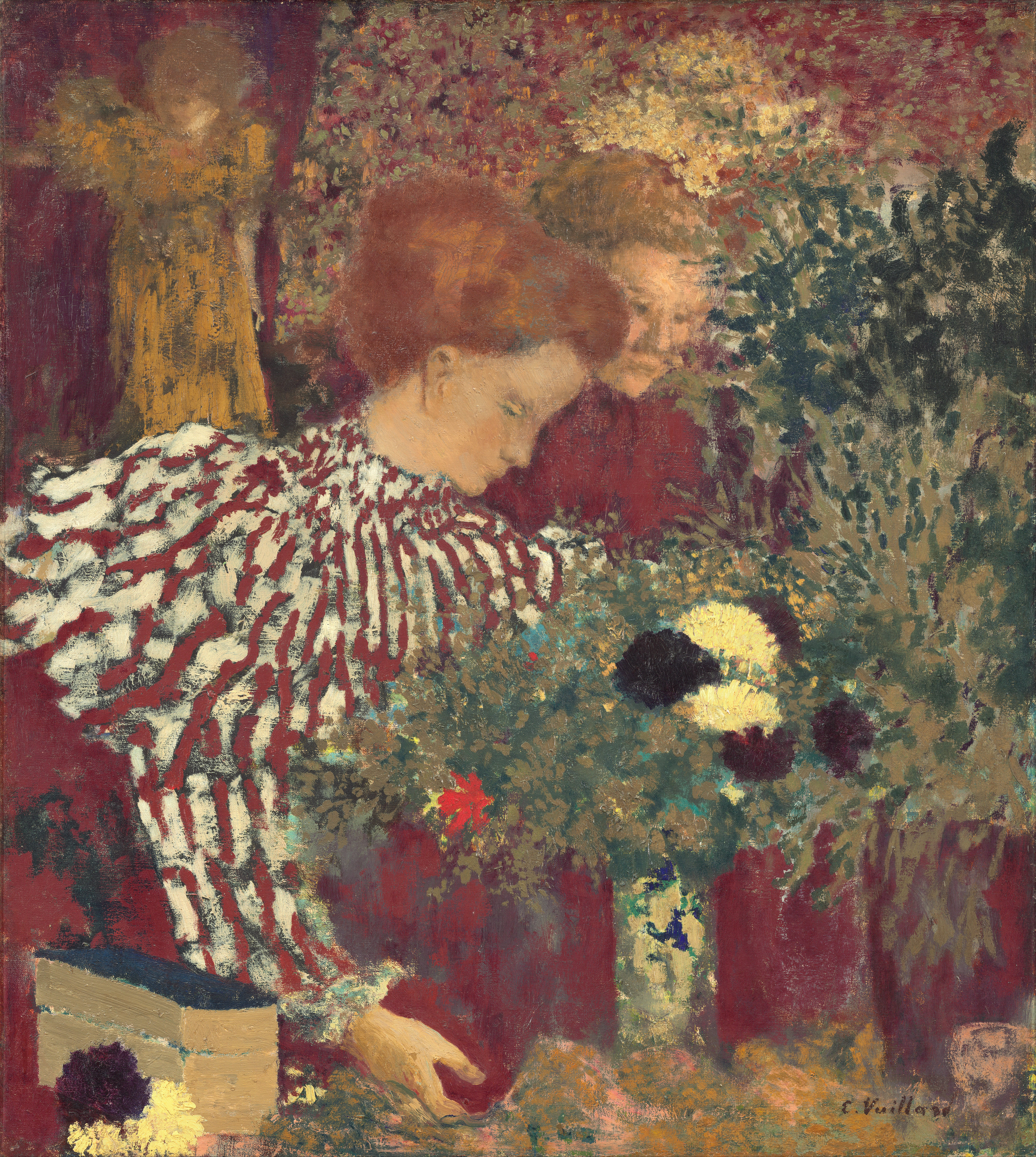
Édouard Vuillard, Woman in a Striped Dress (1895), National Gallery of Art

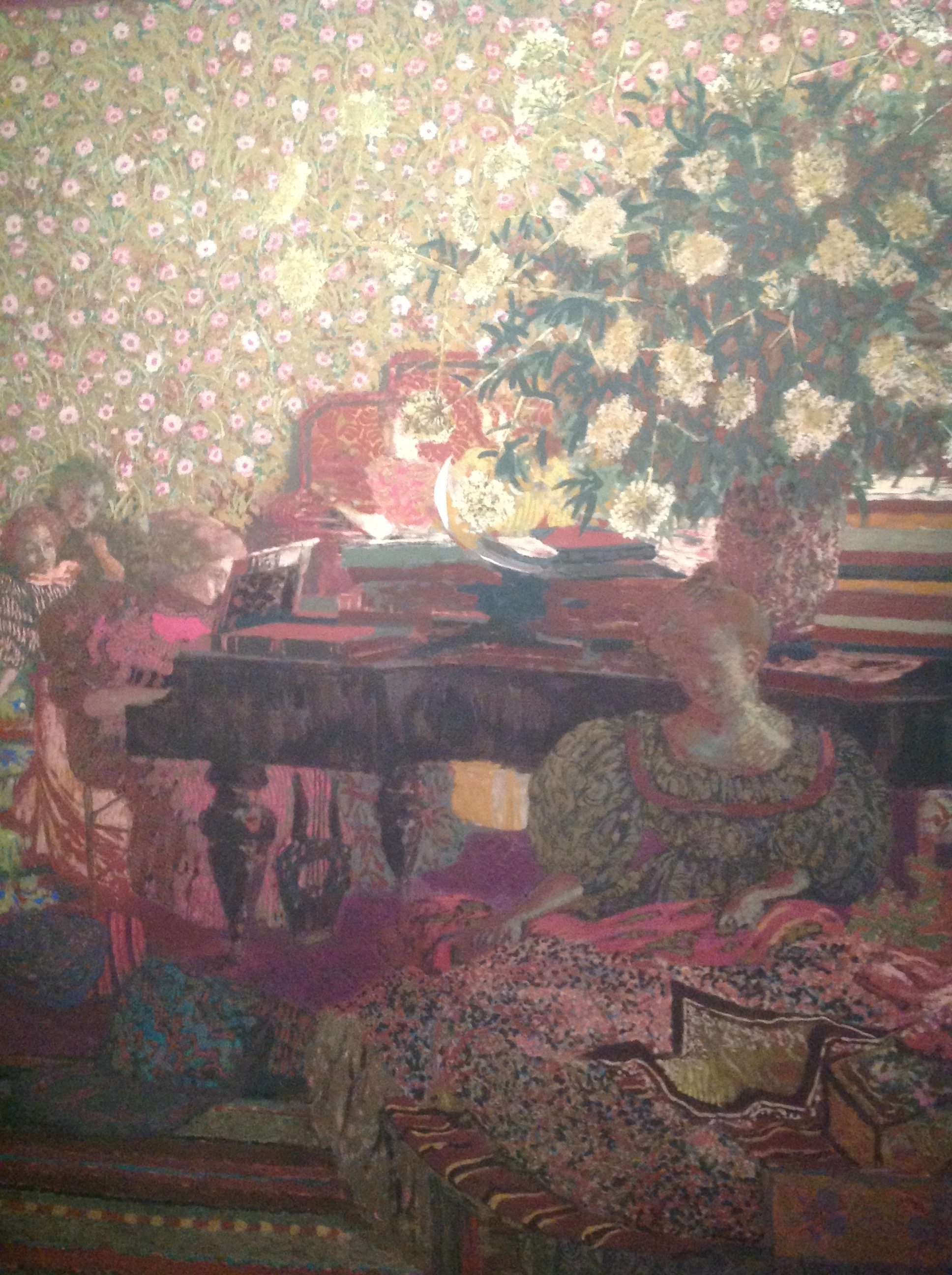
Édouard Vuillard, People in Interior- Music (1896), Petit Palais Museum, Paris

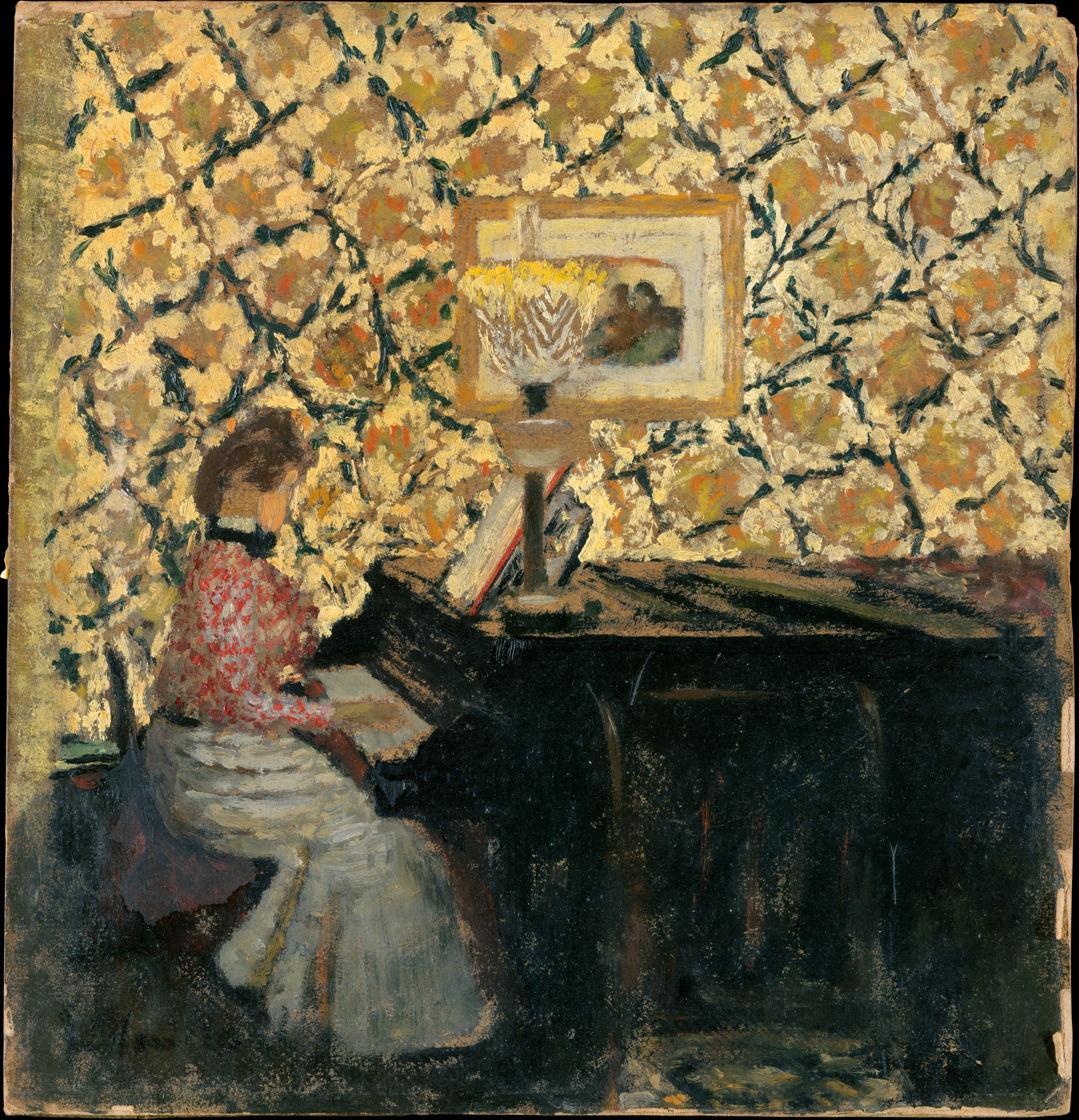
Misia at the Piano (c. 1898), Édouard Vuillard, Metropolitan Museum of Art

== Women in the garden ==
One of the most common subjects of the Nabis was women in an idyllic garden setting, usually picking flowers or fruit. It appeared in four panels representing the seasons of a young woman's life by Maurice Denis (1890–91), painted for the bedroom of a young girl, and in the panels of women in the public parks of Paris by Édouard Vuillard (1894) painted for the residence of his patron Alexandre Nathanson; two paintings of women and children picking apples in an orchard by Pierre Bonnard (1894–96); and in a tapestry by Paul Ranson, Spring, depicting three women picking fruit. All the images are highly stylized, often using the same serpentine forms to represent the women, the trees and the foliage. The young women in the series by Denis are shown traveling along a road, dressed in vestal white in the first painting, then in different colors as they reach maturity in the final painting.

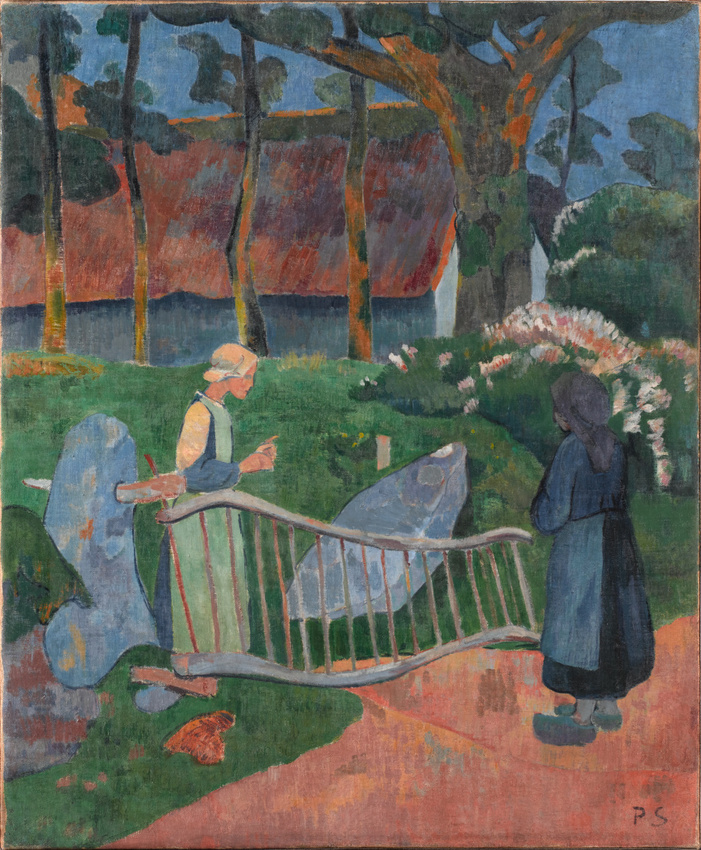
Paul Sérusier, The flower barrier (1889)

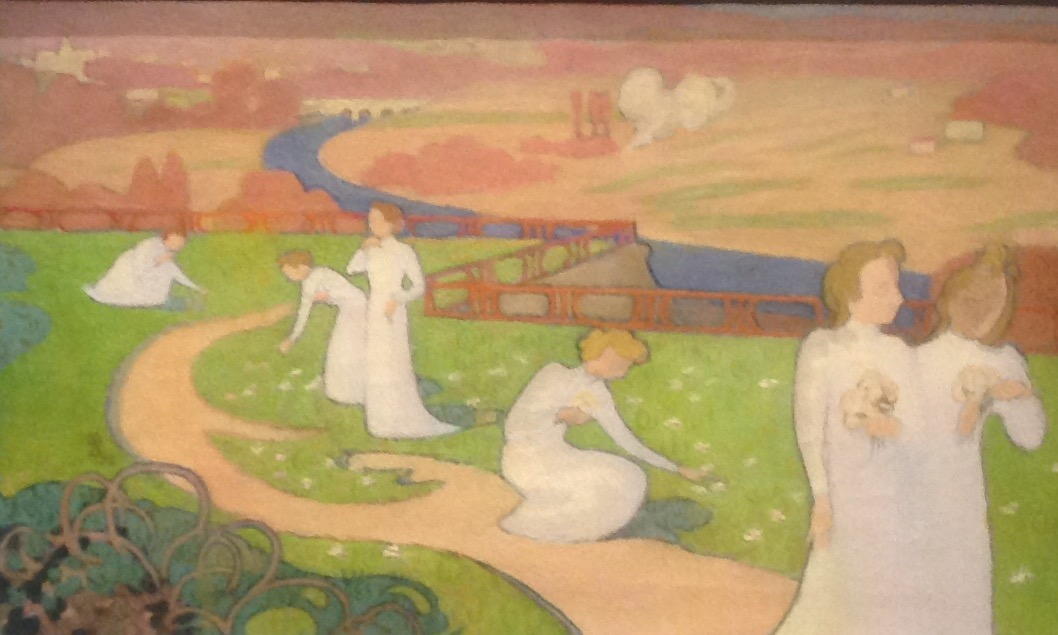
April or The road of life by Maurice Denis, painted for the bedroom of a young girl. (1892)

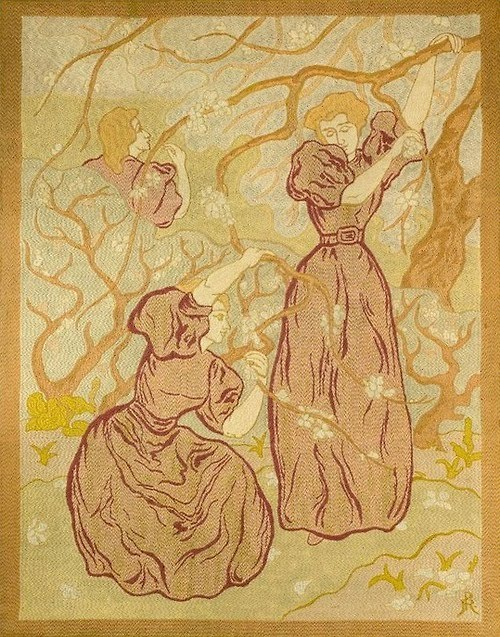
Women picking flowers in the garden, tapestry by Paul Ranson (1895)

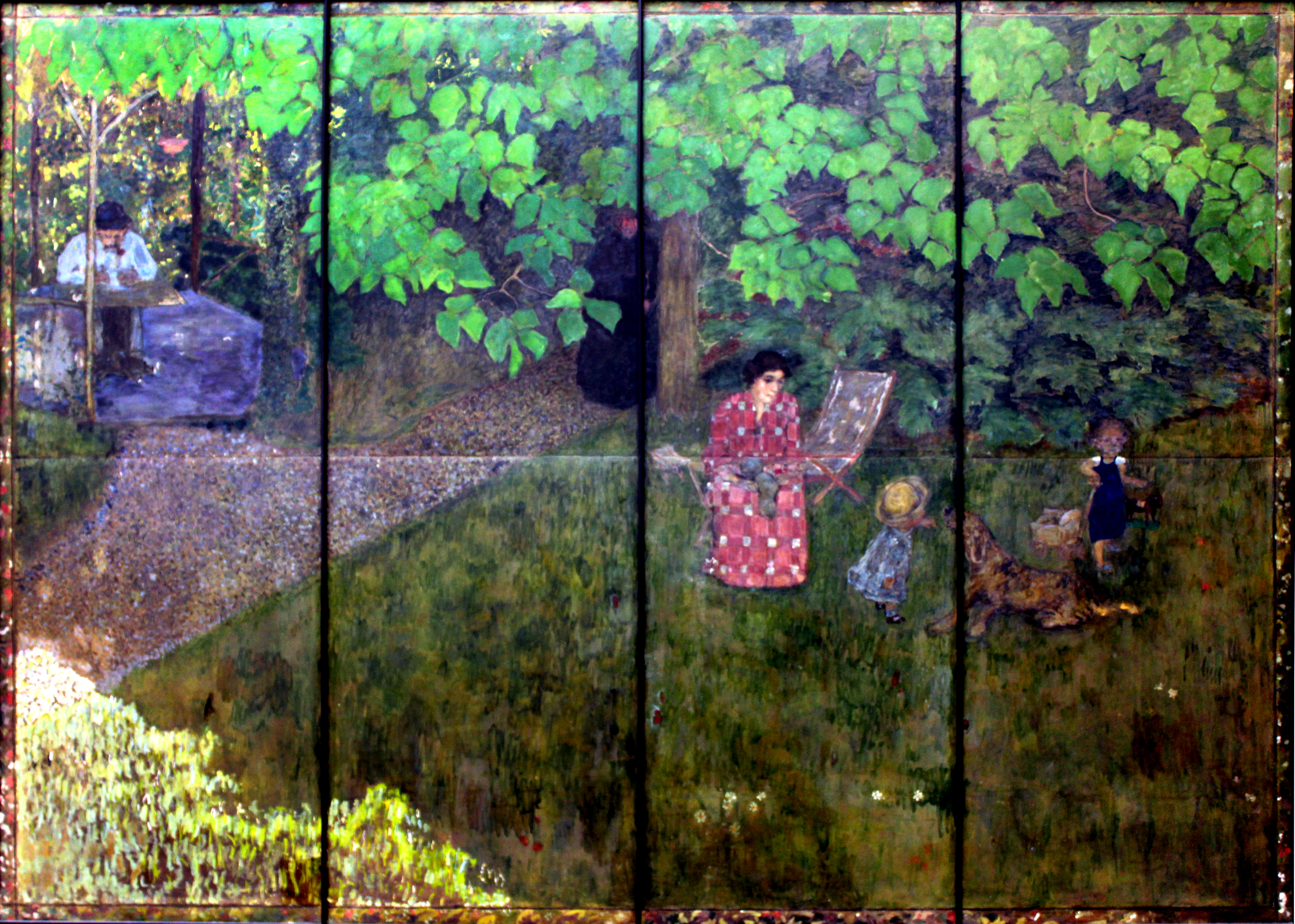
The Bonnard Family in the garden, screen by Pierre Bonnard (1896)

== Decorative art ==
One of the stated objectives of the Nabis was to break down the barriers between art and ordinary life, and in particular the distinction between art and decoration. Much of the art they created was designed specifically to be decorative, for display in salons and dining rooms. They designed screens, murals, wallpaper, tapestries, dishware, lampshades, and ornament for furniture, as well as theater decor and costume design, and graphic design for advertising posters. Paul Ranson, working with Art Nouveau architect Henry Van de Velde made murals to decorate the dining room of art gallery owner Siegfried Bing. After a visit to the United States, where he saw the stained glass designs of Louis Comfort Tiffany and his firm, Bing invited the Nabis to submit their own designs for Tiffany glass. Roussel, Vuillard, Vallotton, Ranson, Denis, Bonnard, and Ibels all made designs, which Bing displayed in his gallery in Paris in April 1895, along with designs of non-Nabis, including Toulouse-Lautrec. In the end the windows were not made, but Maurice Denis continued to create window designs on symbolist themes, with bold designs and vivid colors. In 1895, Vuillard was commissioned to design a series of plates, which featured women in highly stylized costumes.

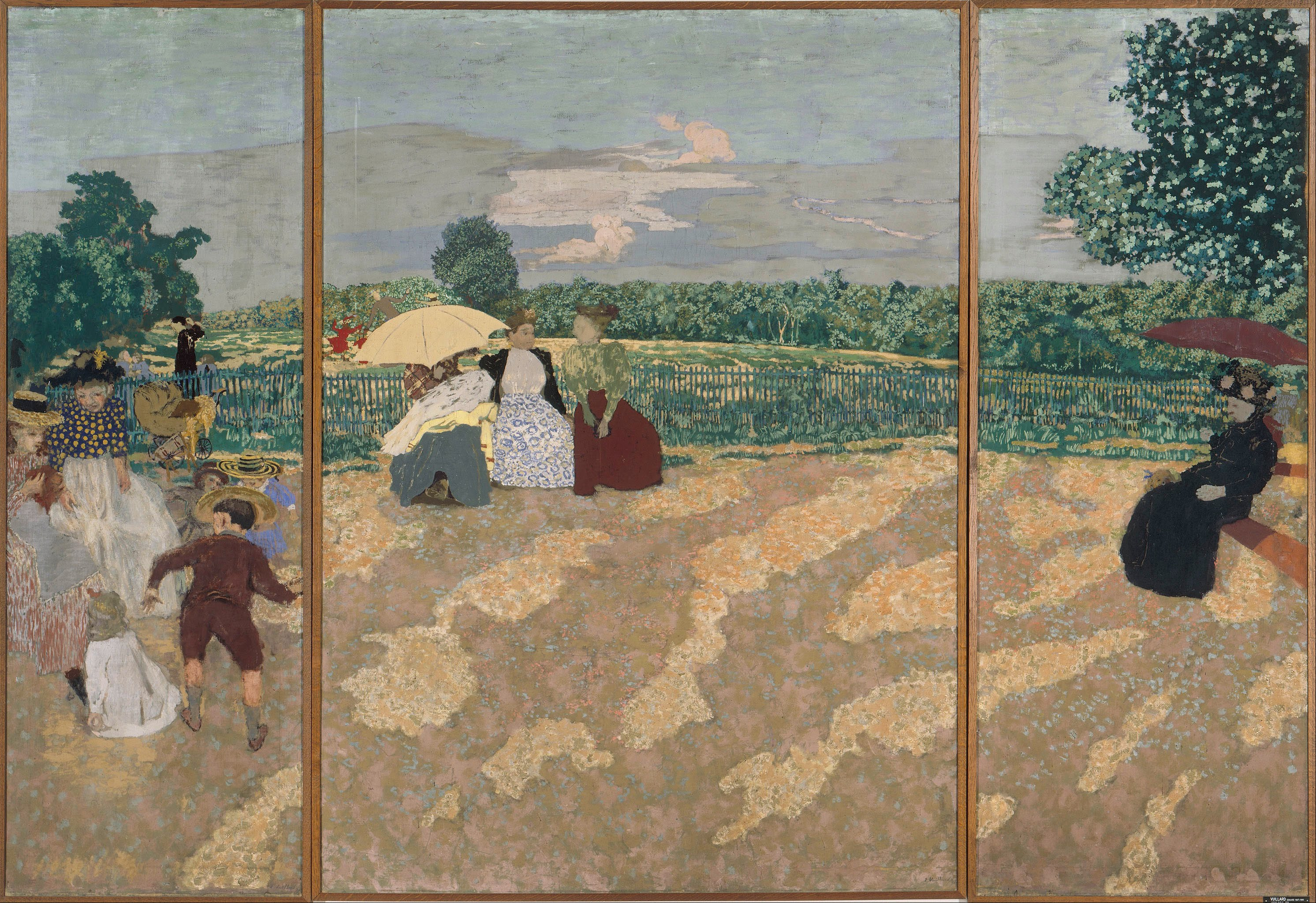
Decorative screen, The Public Gardens by Édouard Vuillard (1895)

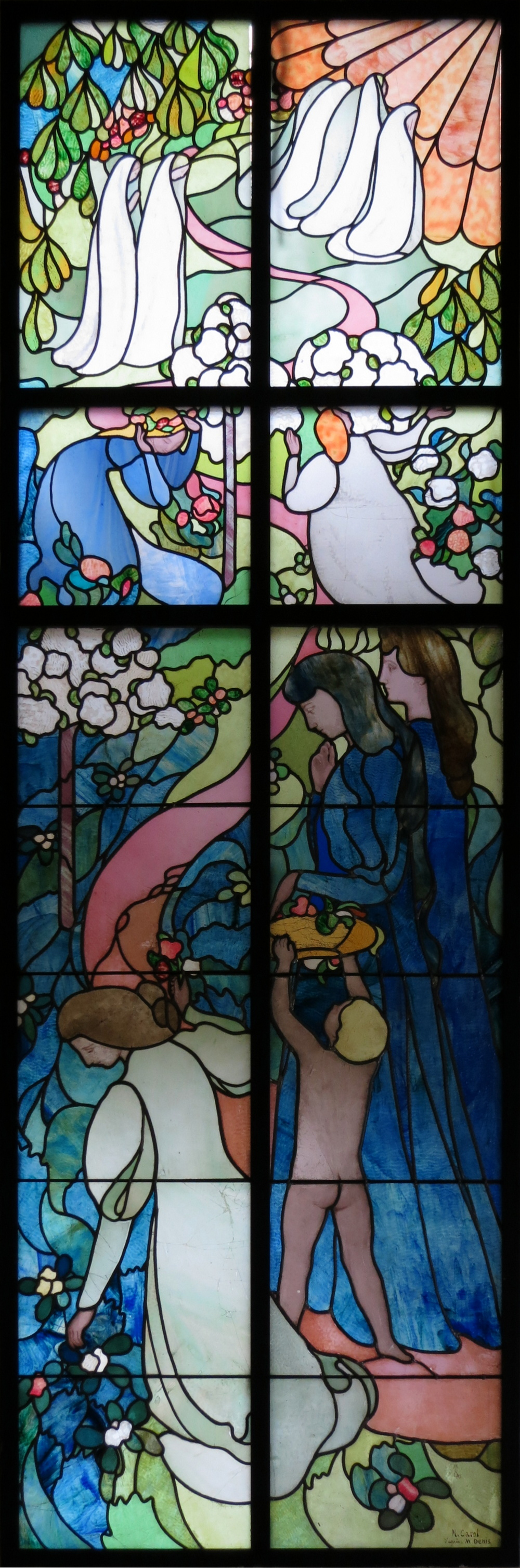
Stained glass window, The Path of Life, by Maurice Denis (1895)

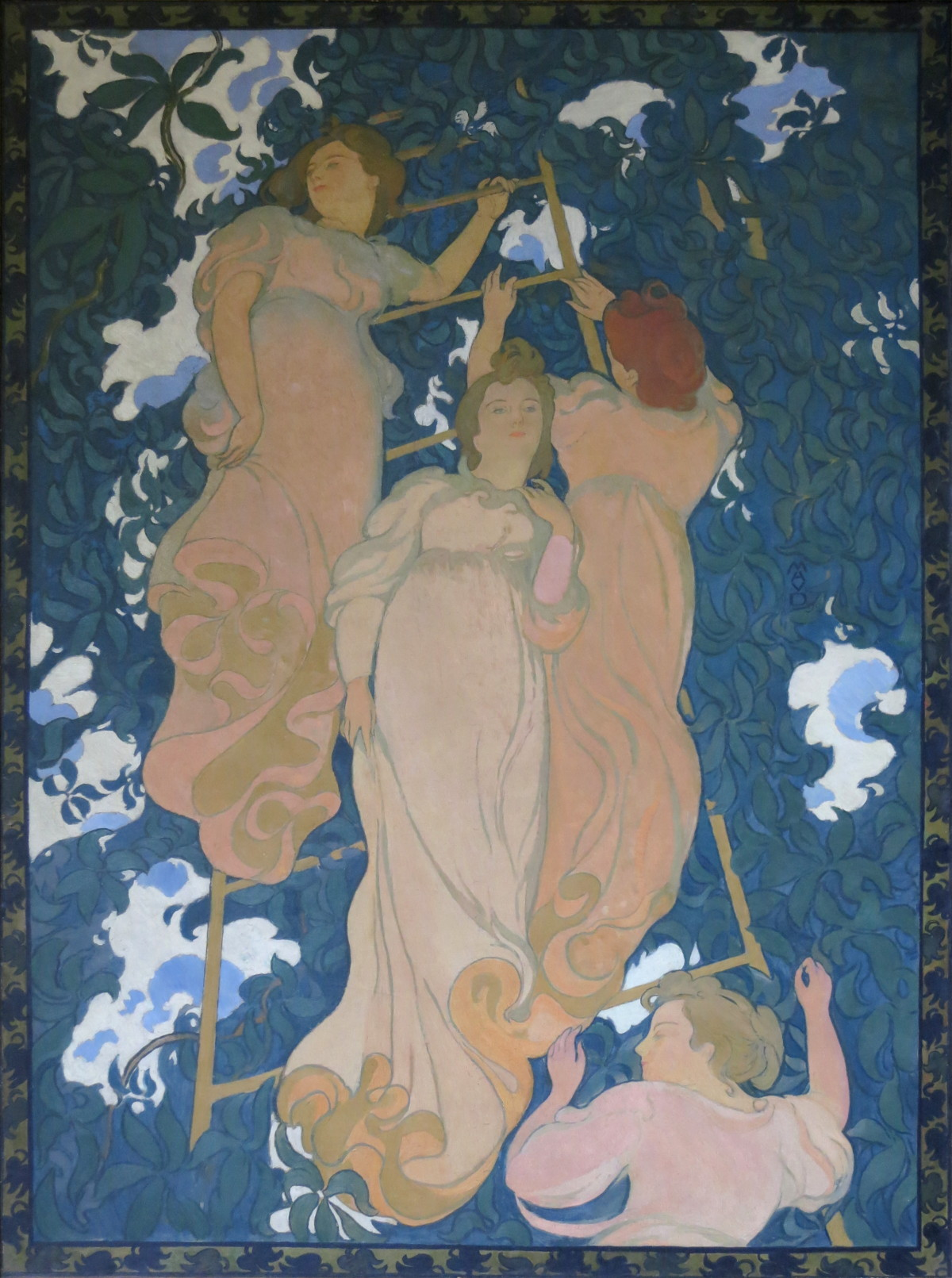
The Ladder in the Foliage by Maurice Denis (1892), canvas on a wood panel, made for the ceiling of the home of art patron Henry Lerolle. The same woman on the ladder is seen from four points of view.

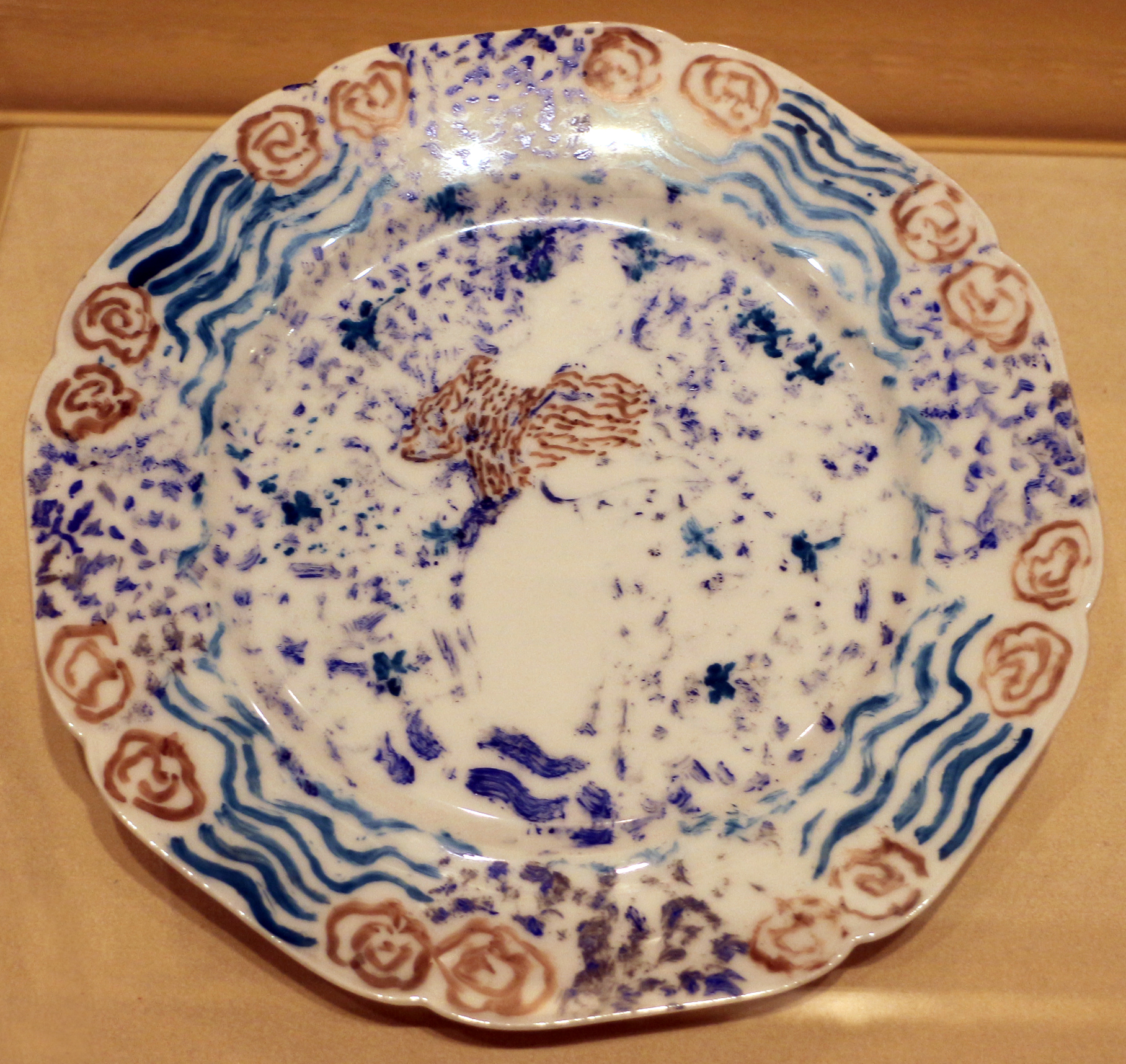
Plate depicting a woman in a striped blouse, by Édouard Vuillard (1895)

== Graphic arts ==
Members of the Nabis worked in a variety of media, using oils on both canvas and cardboard, and distemper on canvas and wall decoration, and they also produced posters, prints, book illustrations, textiles and furniture. Considered to be on the cutting edge of modern art during their early period, their subject matter was representational (though often Symbolist in inspiration), but was design-oriented along the lines of the Japanese prints they so admired, and Art Nouveau. However, the artists of the Nabis circle were highly influenced by the paintings of the Impressionists, and thus while sharing the flatness, page layout, and negative space of art nouveau and other decorative modes, much of Les Nabis' art has a painterly, non-realistic look, with color palettes reminiscent of Cézanne and Gauguin. Bonnard's posters and lithographs are more firmly in the Art Nouveau, or Toulouse-Lautrec manner. After the turn of the century, as modern art moved towards Fauvism, Expressionism, Cubism, and Abstraction, Les Nabis were viewed as conservatives and, indeed, were among the last group of artists to stick to the roots and artistic ambitions of the Impressionists, pursuing these ends almost into the middle of the 20th century. In their later years, these painters also largely abandoned their earlier interests in decorative and applied arts.

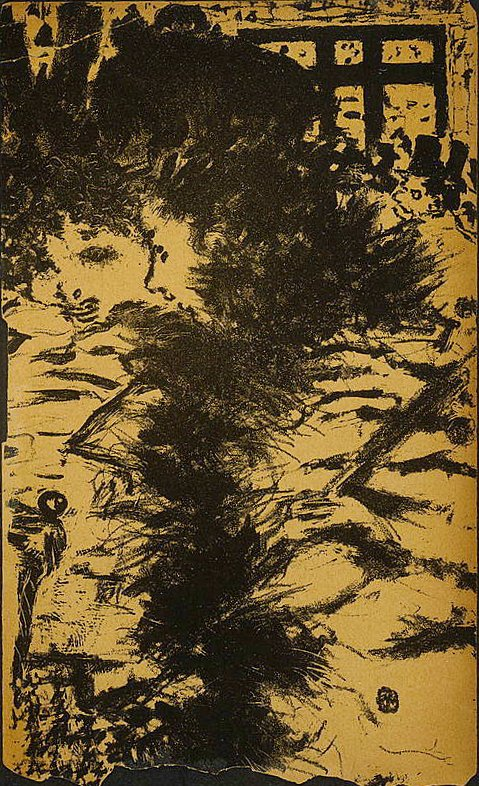
Pierre Bonnard, Les Parisiennes 1893, lithograph

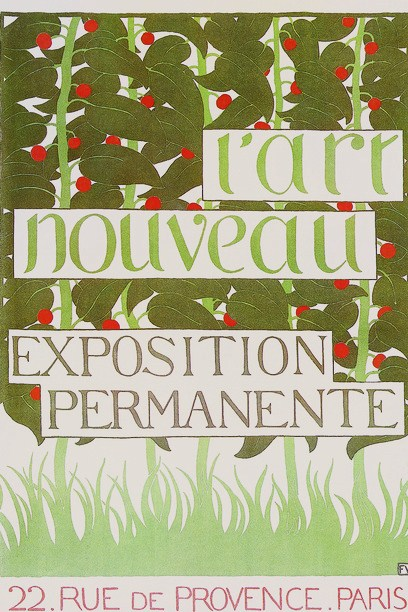
Félix Vallotton poster for Siegfried Bing's Gallery (1893)

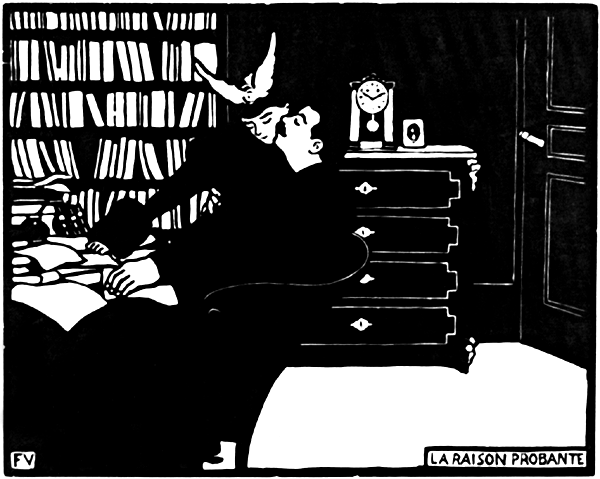
Félix Vallotton, La raison probante (The Cogent Reason), a woodcut from the series Intimités (1898)

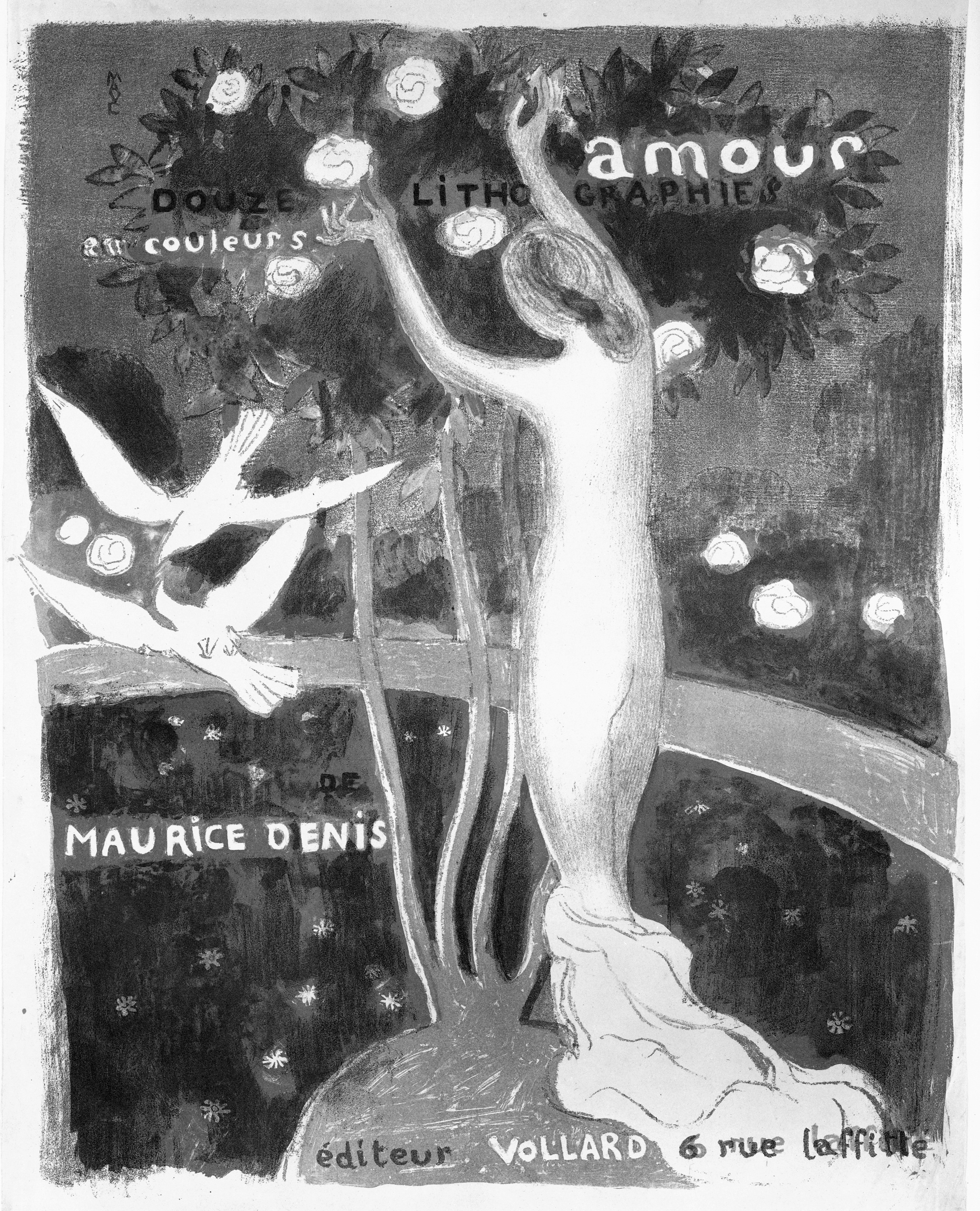
Maurice Denis, Frontispiece lithograph from the series Amour (1899)

== Breakup ==
In 1897, the Nabis were not present at the well-known Salon des Indépendants, but instead held their own exposition at the Galerie Vollard, more avant-garde than the Salon. Their final exhibition as a group took place in 1900 at the Galerie Bernheim, with works of Bonnard, Denis, Ibels, Maillol, Roussel, Sérusier, Vallotton and Vuillard. After that show, each of the artists went his separate way.

Looking back in 1909, Denis described the accomplishment of the Nabis. "Art is no longer a visual sensation that we gather, like a photograph, as it were, of nature. No, it is a creation of our spirit, for which nature is only the occasion."

In 1937, Vuillard described the breakup of the Nabis. "...The march of progress was so rapid. Society was ready to welcome cubism and surrealism before we had reached what we had imagined as our goal. We found ourselves in a way suspended in the air."

== Members and associates ==
- Pierre Bonnard (1867–1947), le nabi très japonard
- Maurice Denis (1870–1943), le nabi aux belles icônes
- Maxime Dethomas (1869–1929)
- Meyer de Haan (1852–1895), le nabi hollandais
- Rene Georges Hermann-Paul (1864–1940)
- Henri-Gabriel Ibels (1867–1936), le nabi journaliste
- Georges Lacombe (1868–1916), le nabi sculpteur
- Lugné-Poe (1869–1940)
- Aristide Maillol (1861–1944)
- Paul Ranson (1864–1909), le nabi plus japonard que le nabi japonard
- József Rippl-Rónai (1861–1927), le nabi hongrois
- Ker-Xavier Roussel (1867–1944)
- Paul Sérusier (1864–1927), le nabi à la barbe rutilante
- Marguérite Sérusier, wife of Paul Sérusier; a notable decorative painter
- Félix Vallotton (1865–1925), le nabi étranger
- Jan Verkade (1868–1946), le nabi obéliscal
- Édouard Vuillard (1868–1940), le nabi zouave
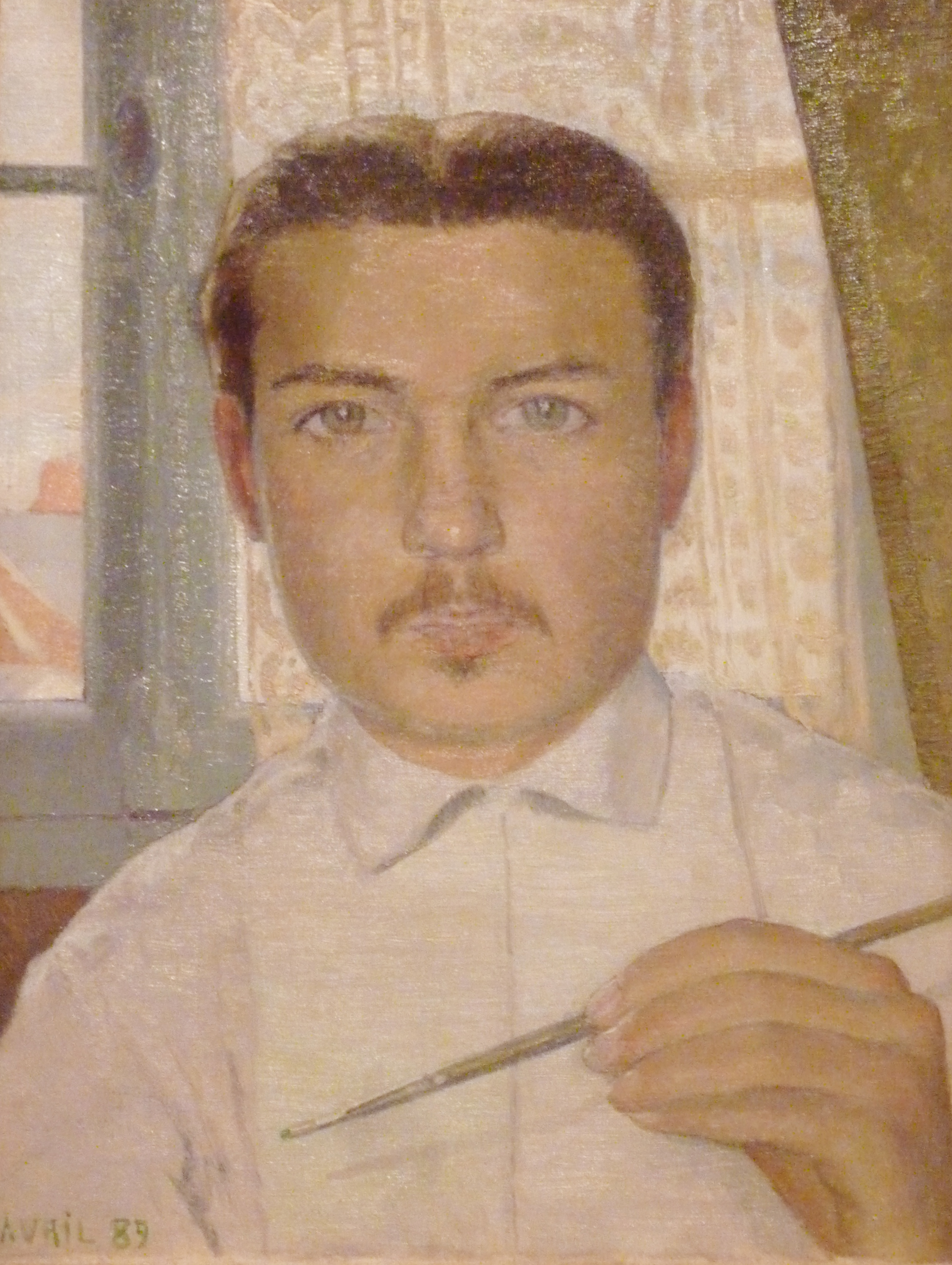
Maurice Denis, aged eighteen, in 1889

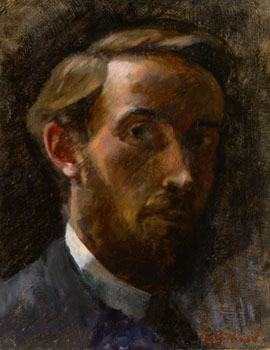
Édouard Vuillard, Self-portrait, 1889

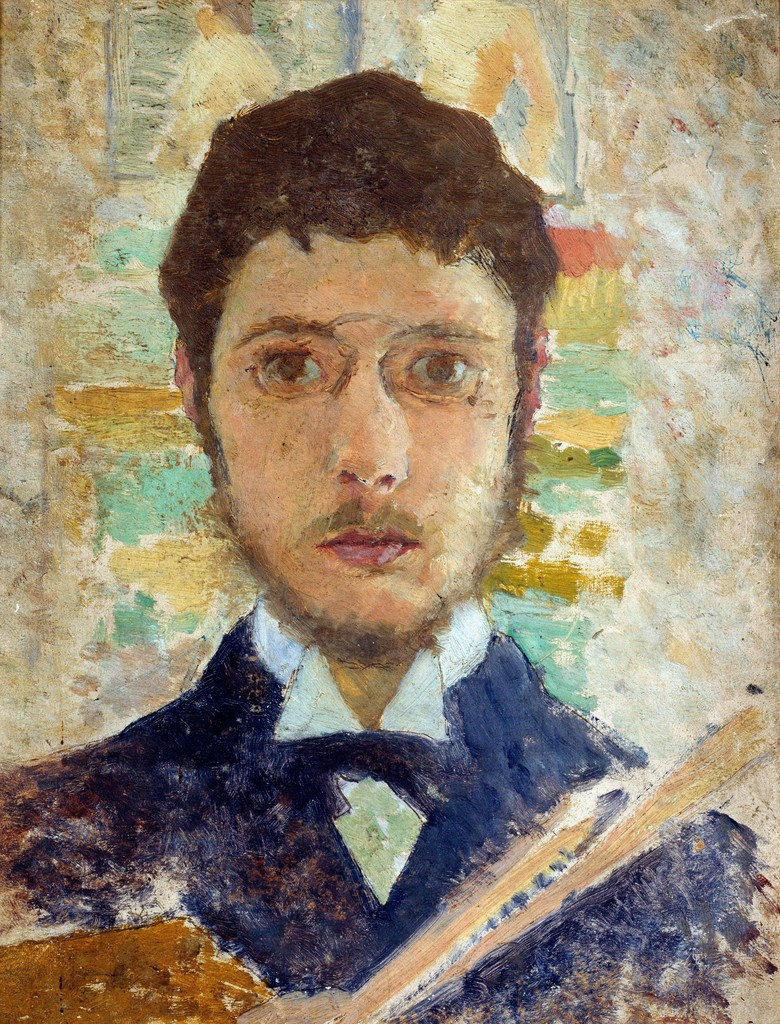
Pierre Bonnard, Self-portrait, c. 1889

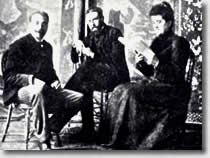
Paul Ranson, Paul Sérusier, and Marie-France Ranson in Paul Ranson's studio, c. 1900

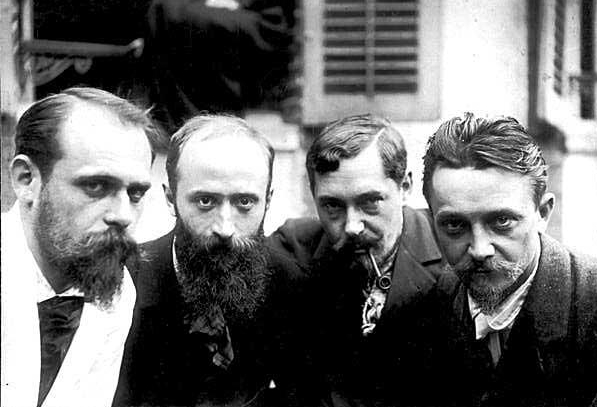
Ker-Xavier Roussel, Édouard Vuillard, Romain Coolus, Félix Vallotton, 1899

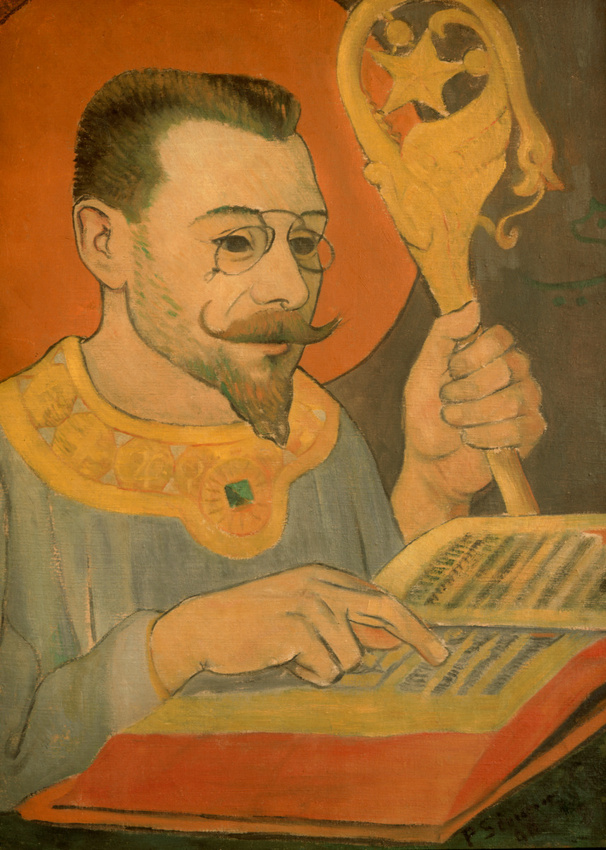
Portrait of Paul Ranson in Nabi costume, by Paul Sérusier

Other members of the group included the playwright Pierre Veber, the musician Pierre Hermant, and the linguist Auguste Cazalis, called (by Ranson) le nabi Ben Kallyre.

== Gallery ==
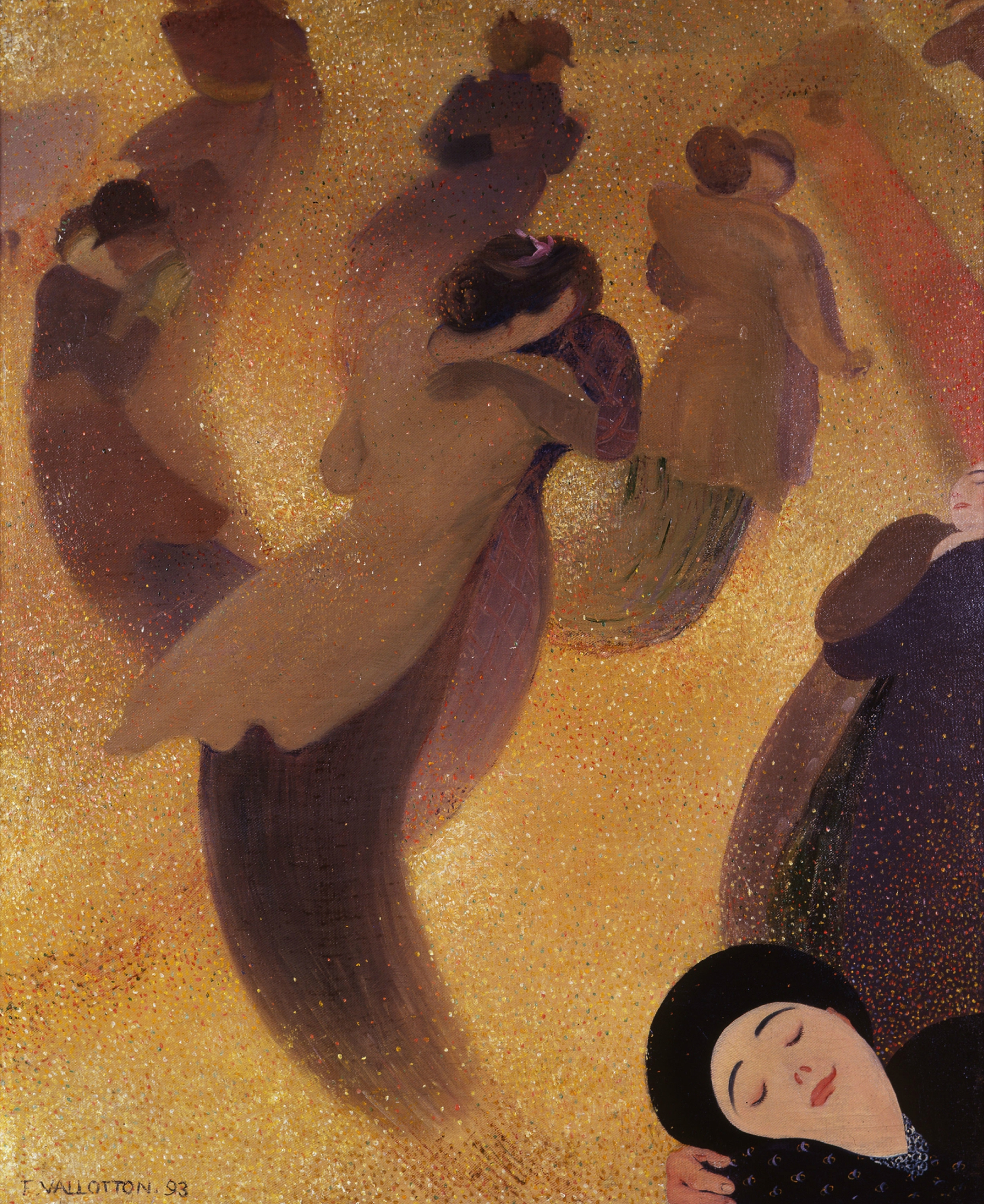
The Waltz, Félix Vallotton, Museum of Modern Art Le Havre (1893)

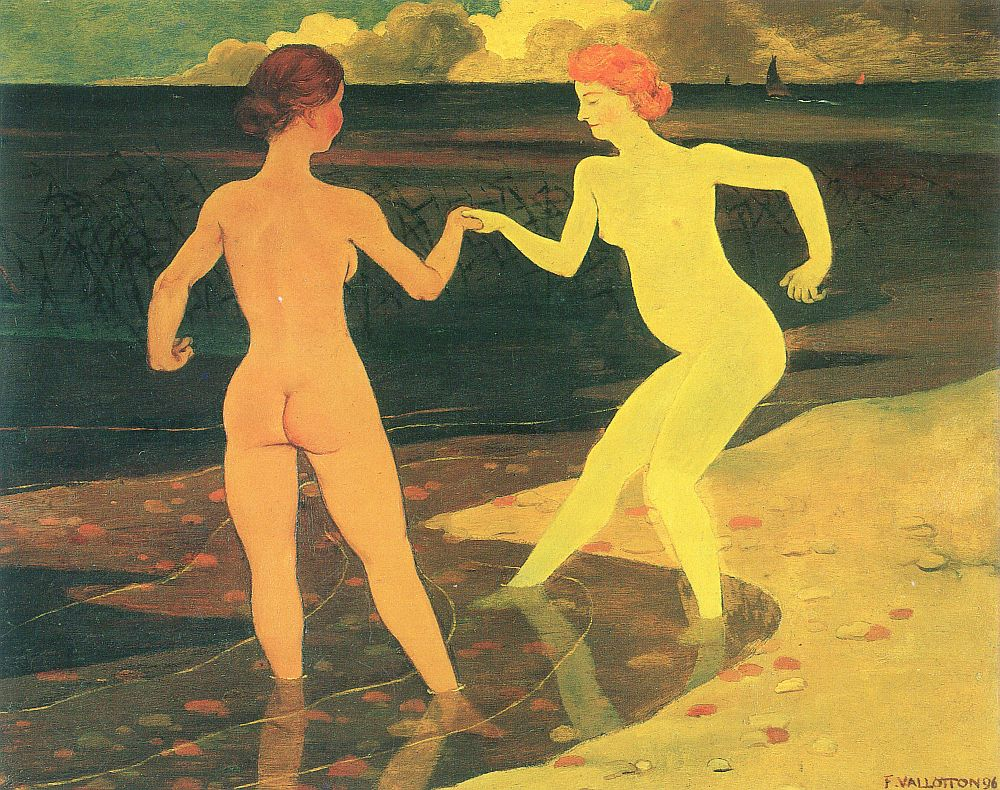
Félix Vallotton, The Mistress and the Servant, 1896

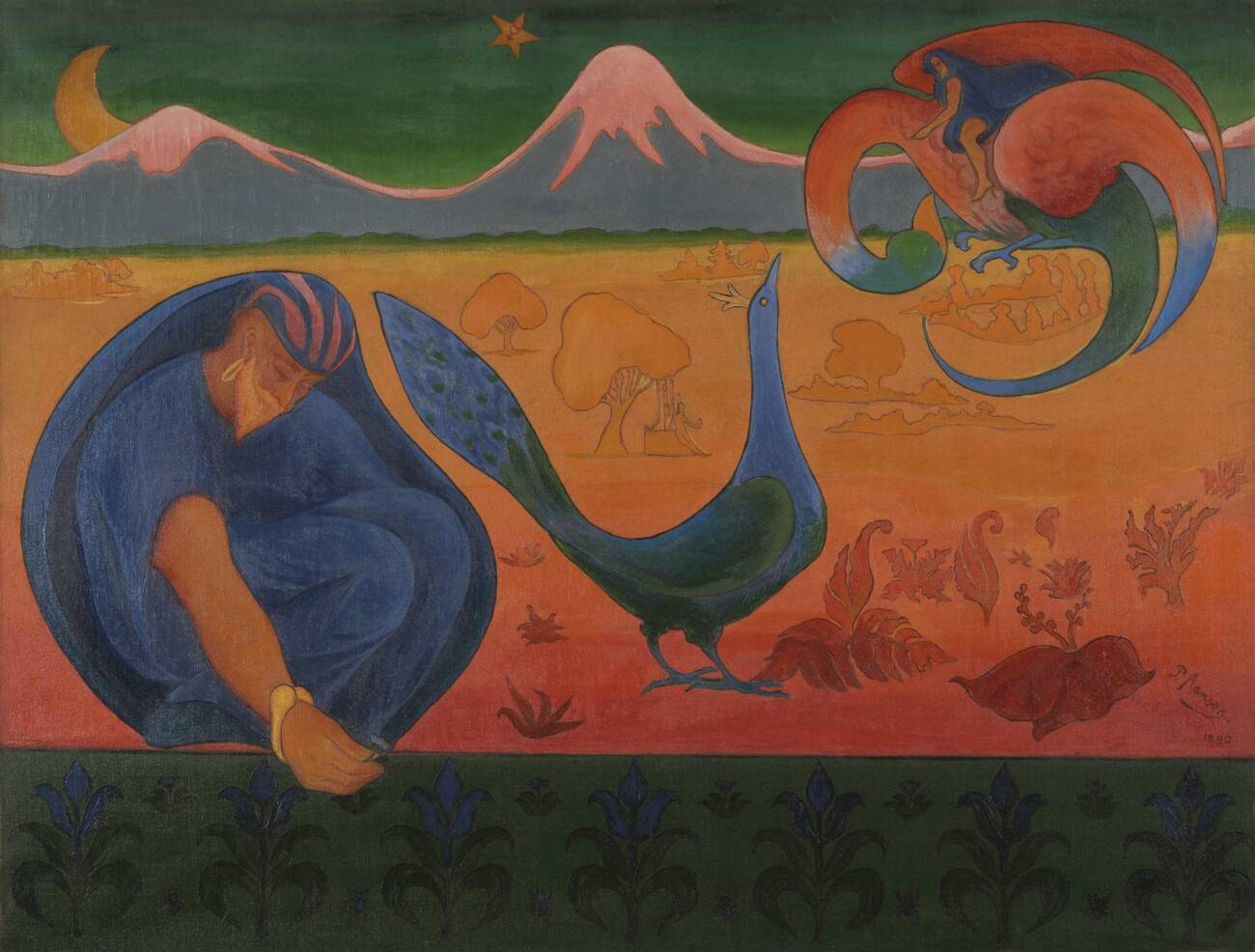
Paul Ranson, Nabis Landscape, 1890

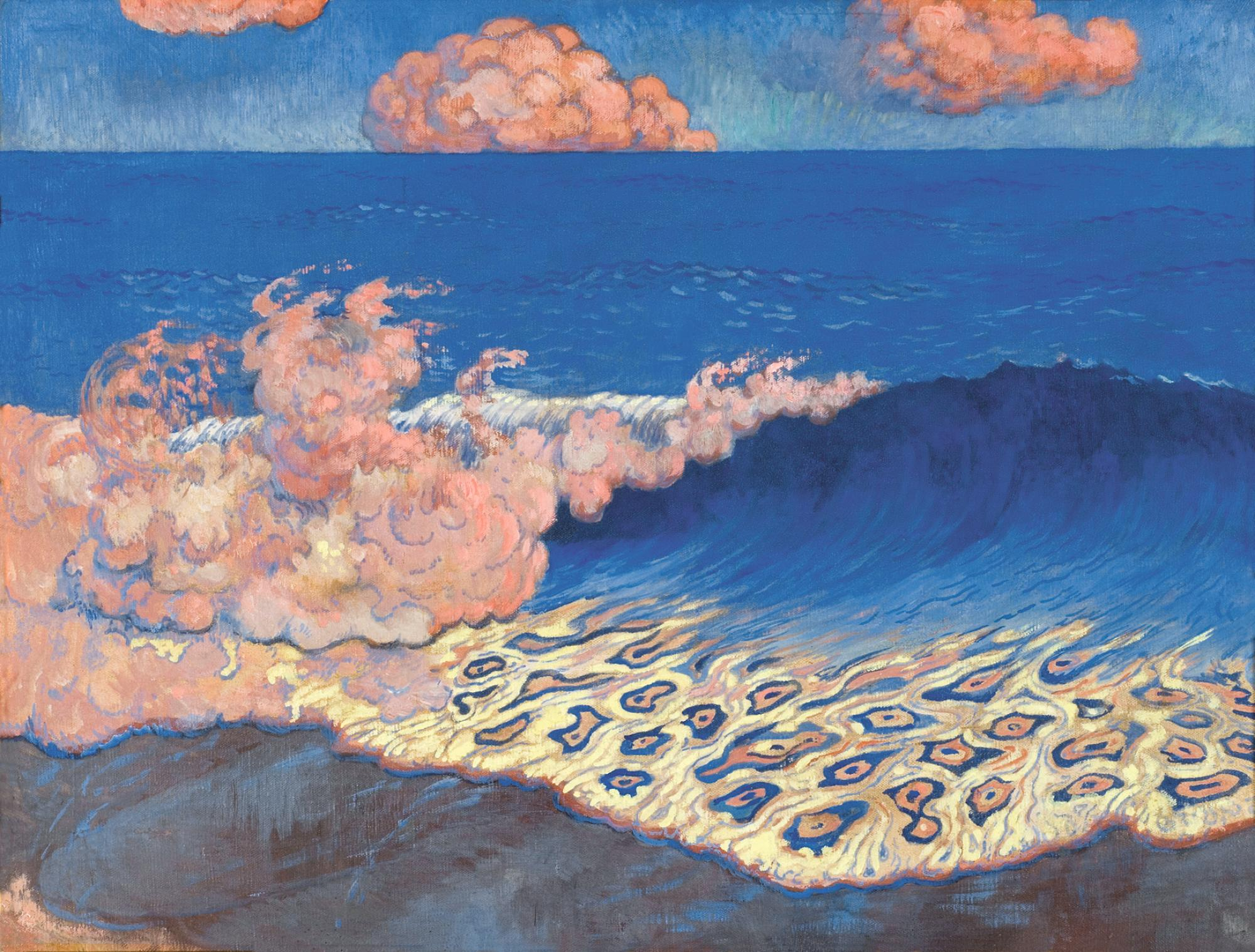
Georges Lacombe, Marine bleue, Effet de vagues, 1893

== See also ==
- Pont-Aven School
- Henry Lerolle, patron
- Odilon Redon

== Bibliography ==
- Bouillon, Jean-Paul (2006). Maurice Denis - Le spirituel dans l'art (in French). Paris: Gallimard. ISBN 978-2-07-031929-9.
- Cogeval, Guy (2015). Bonnard. Paris: Hazan, Malakoff. (in French) ISBN 978-2-7541-08-36-2*
