= Georges Lacombe (painter) =

French painter and sculptor (1868–1916)

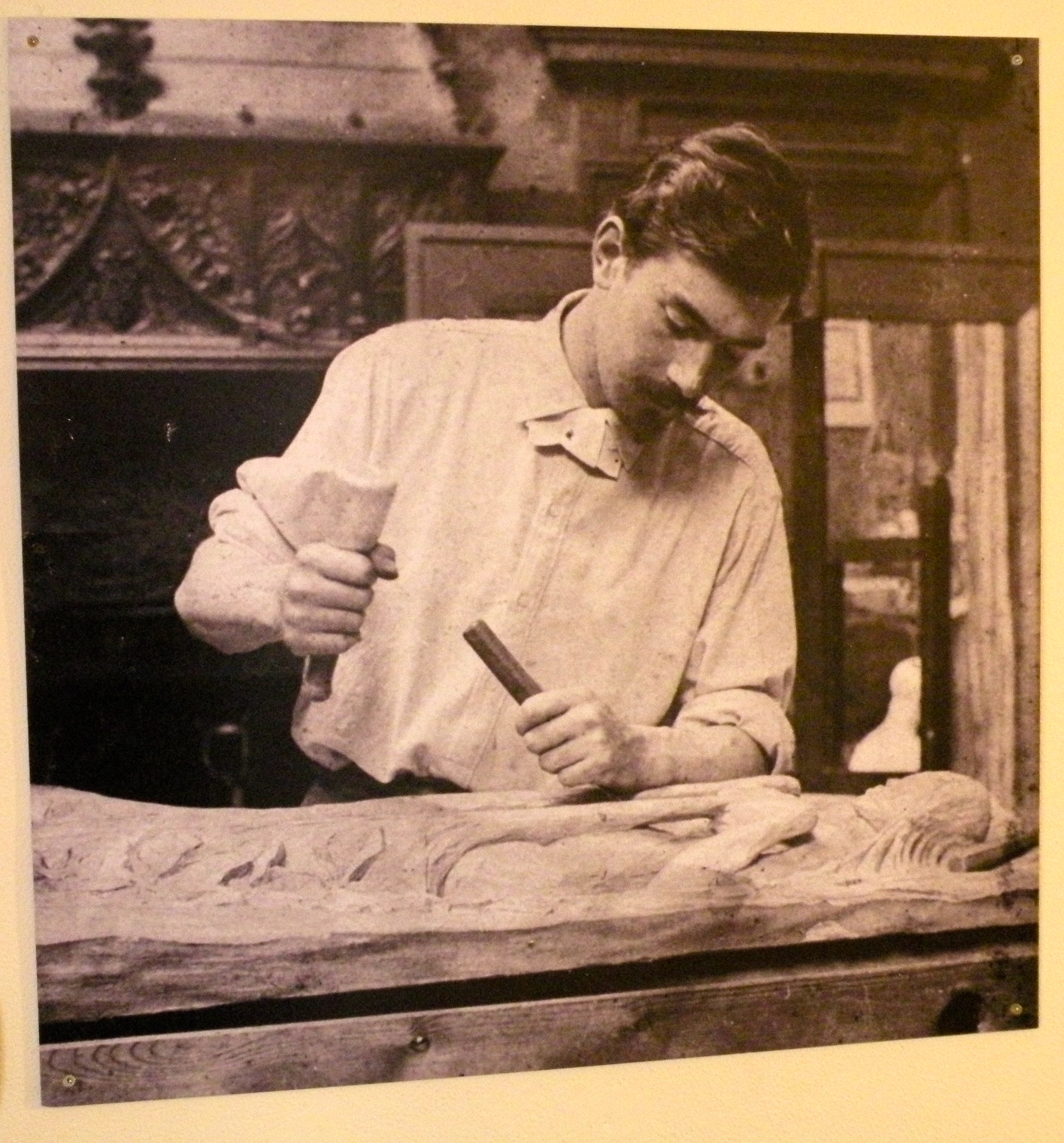
- Lacombe in Versailles, 1893
- Born: 18 June 1868; Versailles, Yvelines, Île-de-France, France
- Died: 29 June 1916 (aged 48); Alençon, Orne, France
- Education: Académie Julian
- Occupations: Sculptor; painter

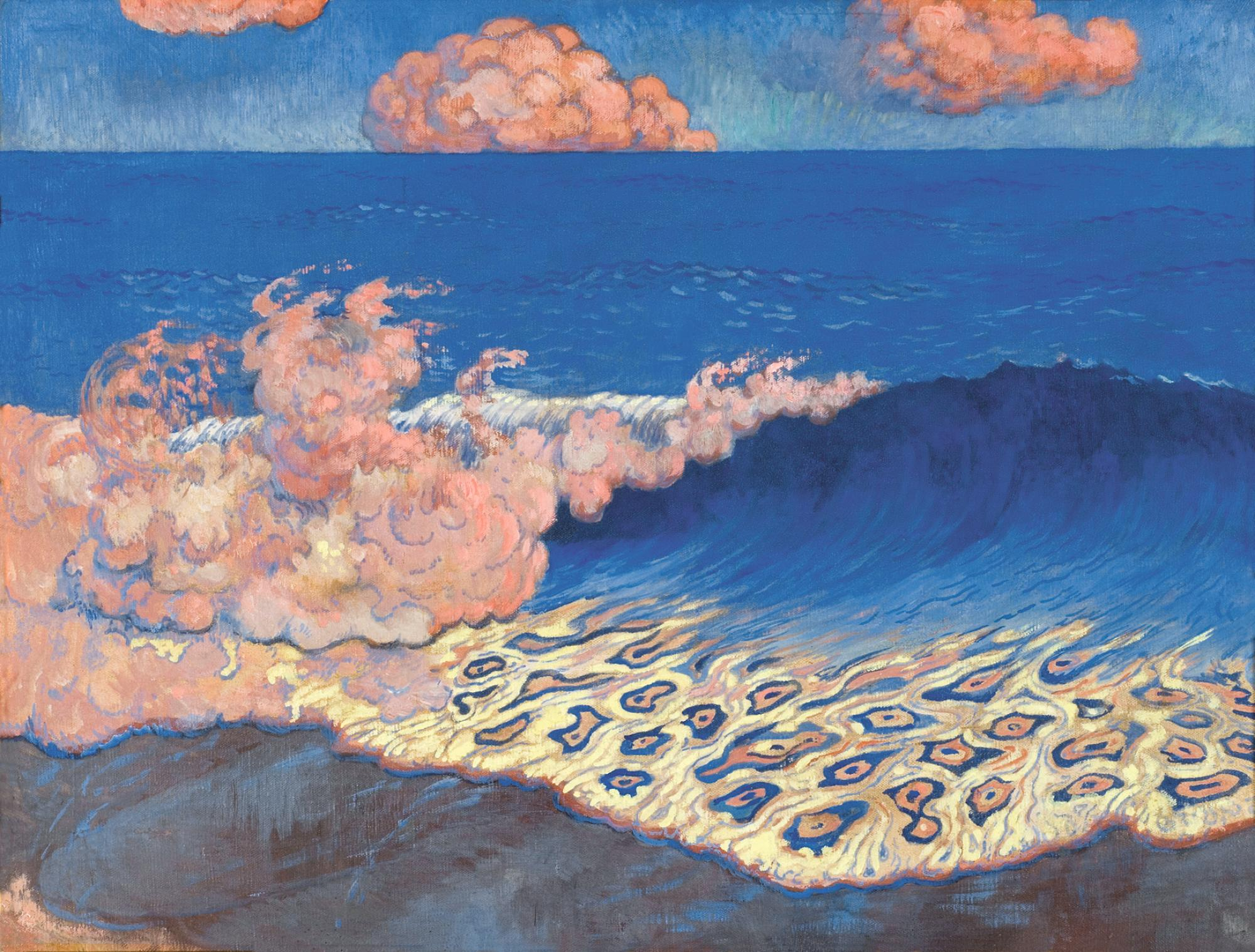
Marine bleue, Effet de vagues, 1893, tempera on toile, 49 x 65 cm, Musée des Beaux-Arts de Rennes

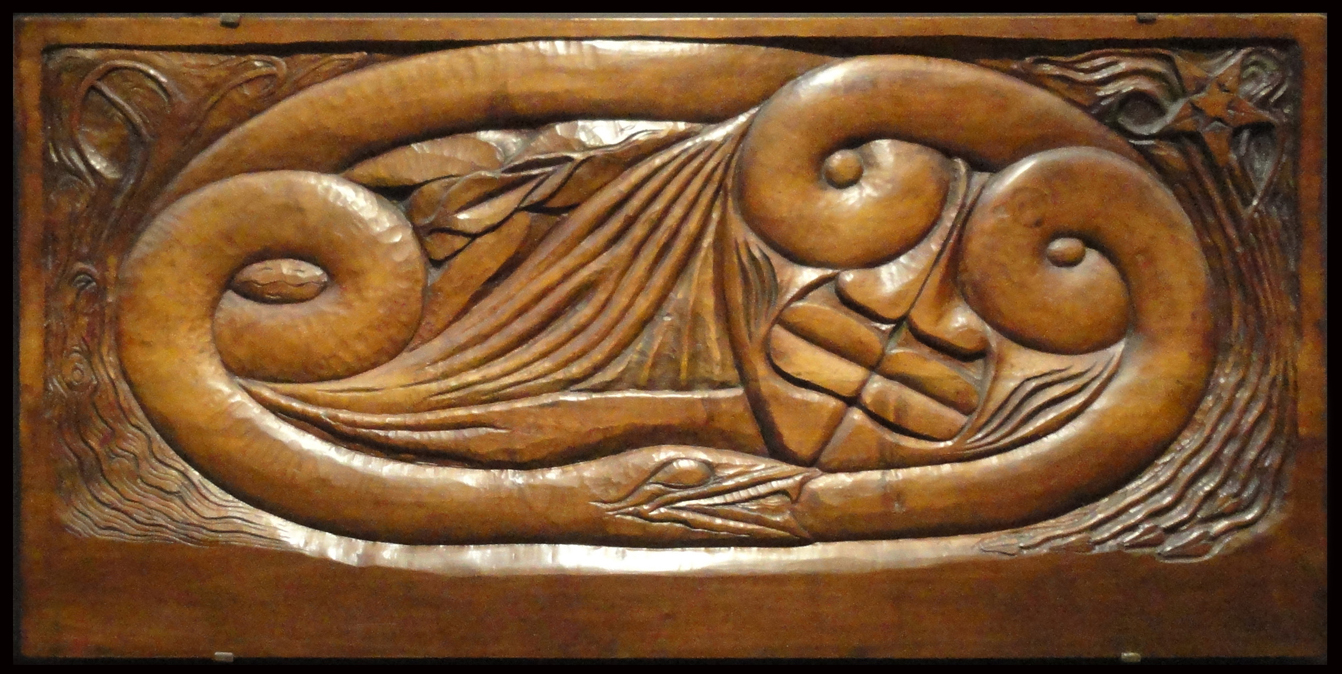
Georges Lacombe, 1894, 1896, L'Existence, carved wood (Bas-relief en bois de noyer), 68.5 x 141.5 x 6 cm, Musée d'Orsay, Paris

Georges Lacombe (18 June 1868 – 29 June 1916) was a French sculptor and painter.

== Early life ==
Born to a distinguished family of Versailles, he received his artistic training at the Académie Julian from the impressionists Alfred Philippe Roll and Henri Gervex.

== The Nabis ==
At the Académie Julian he met Émile Bernard and Paul Sérusier in 1892, shortly afterwards becoming a member of their artist group, Les Nabis.

Like many other Nabi he spent the summers from 1888 to 1897 in Brittany, some sources record that he met Bernard and Sérusier there. He became Le Nabi sculpteur: the sculptor of the group. In fact many sources refer to him solely as sculptor.

== Death ==
Georges Lacombe died of tuberculosis in Alençon, Orne on 29 June 1916, eleven days after his 48th birthday.

== References and sources ==
Sources

- Frèches-Thory, Claire, & Perucchi-Petry, Ursula, ed.: Die Nabis: Propheten der Moderne, Kunsthaus Zürich & Grand Palais, Paris & Prestel, Munich 1993. ISBN 3-7913-1969-8 (in German and French)
