= Canton of Albi-1 =

Coordinates: 43.93°N 2.15°E

The canton of Albi-1 is an administrative division of the Tarn department, southern France. It was created at the French canton reorganisation which came into effect in March 2015. Its seat is in Albi.

It consists of the following communes:

1. Albi (partly)
