= Antoinette de Saliès =

French writer

- Born: Antoinette de Salvan de Saliès; 1639
- Died: June 13, 1730 (aged 90–91); Salies
- Occupations: writer and feminist

Antoinette de Salvan de Saliès (1639 – June 13, 1730, Saliès) was a French writer and feminist.

== Early years ==
Antoinette de Salvan was born in Albi, in 1639; she was baptized November 27, 1639. Her nickname was "the little muse of Albi". She married the marquess, Antoine de Saliès, and became known as "Marchioness de Saliès".

== Writing and activism ==
After her husband's death, Saliès devoted herself to romantic writing in the form of the historical novel, as well as poetic and epistolary writing, while ensuring the education of her children. She was honored in 1689 at the Academy of Ricovrati in Padua, but did not go to Italy or elsewhere, having never left her province.

In 1704, Saliès founded the Society of Knights and Signet of Good Faith, a literary society, which said of itself: "A tender and sincere friendship, Sweeter a thousand times than the amorous law, Must be the link, the kind character Knights of Good Faith." Saliès had the ambition to create a "new sect of philosophers in favor of the ladies" and was convinced of the equality of the sexes. (Note: Letter V of Madame de Saliez to Monsieur de Vertron) At least three buildings carry her name: a restaurant in Albi named La viguière d'Alby, the village hall of Saliès, and Salvan-de-Saliès School.

== Death ==
She died on June 13, 1730, at the age 91.

== Selected works ==
- Oeuvres complètes
- Perqué venguèt? ...
- La comtesse d'Isembourg
