= Albi =

- Prefecture and commune
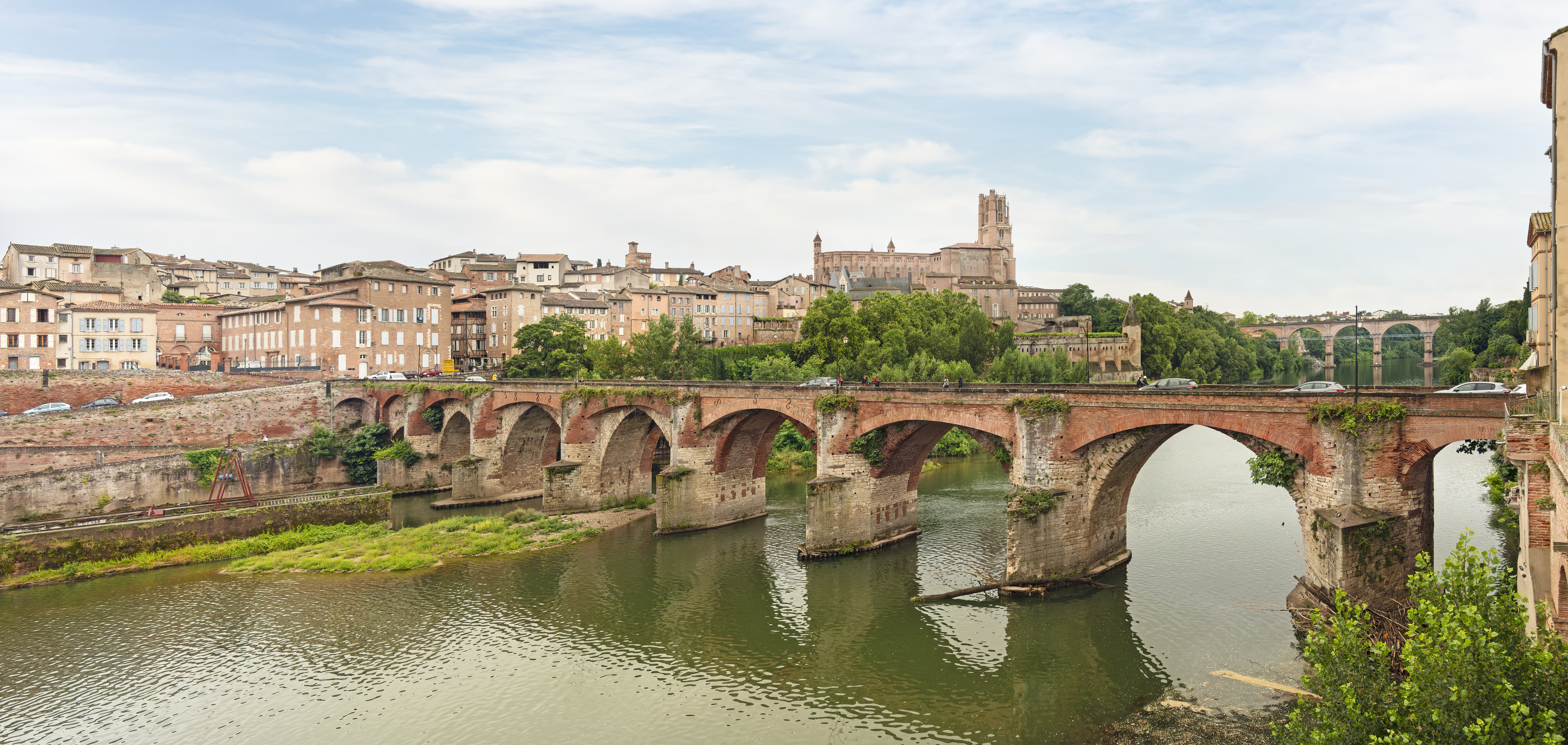
- Albi featuring the Sainte-Cécile cathedral and the Pont Vieux (old bridge) over the river Tarn

- Coat of arms
- Location of Albi
- Location within France Location within Occitanie
- Coordinates: 43°55′44″N 2°08′47″E
- Country: France
- Region: Occitania
- Department: Tarn
- Arrondissement: Albi
- Canton: Albi-1, Albi-2, Albi-3, Albi-4
- Intercommunality: CA Albigeois

Government
  - Mayor (2020–2026): Stéphanie Guiraud-Chaumeil
- Area^{1}: 44.26 km^{2} (17.09 sq mi)
- Elevation: 169 m (554 ft)
- Highest elevation: 308 m (1,010 ft)
- Lowest elevation: 130 m (430 ft)
- Population (2023): 51,290
  - Density: 1,159/km^{2} (3,001/sq mi)
- Time zone: UTC+01:00 (CET)
  - Summer (DST): UTC+02:00 (CEST)
- INSEE/Postal code: 81004 /81000

UNESCO World Heritage Site
- Official name: Episcopal City of Albi
- Criteria: Cultural: iv, v
- Reference: 1337
- Inscription: 2010 (34th Session)
- Area: 19.47 ha (48.1 acres)
- Buffer zone: 64.09 ha (158.4 acres)
- ^{1} French Land Register data, which excludes lakes, ponds, glaciers > 1 km^{2} (0.386 sq mi or 247 acres) and river estuaries.

Albi (French pronunciation: [albi]; Occitan: Albi [ˈalβi]) is a commune in southern France. It is the prefecture of the Tarn department, on the river Tarn, 85 km northeast of Toulouse. Its inhabitants are called Albigensians (French: Albigeois, Albigeoise(s), Occitan: albigés -esa(s)). It is the seat of the Archbishop of Albi.

The episcopal city, around the Cathedral Sainte-Cécile, was added to the UNESCO list of World Heritage Sites in 2010 for its unique architecture. The site includes the Musée Toulouse-Lautrec, dedicated to the artist who was born in Albi.

== Administration ==
Albi is the seat of four cantons, covering 16 communes, with a total population of 72,416 (2019).

== History ==
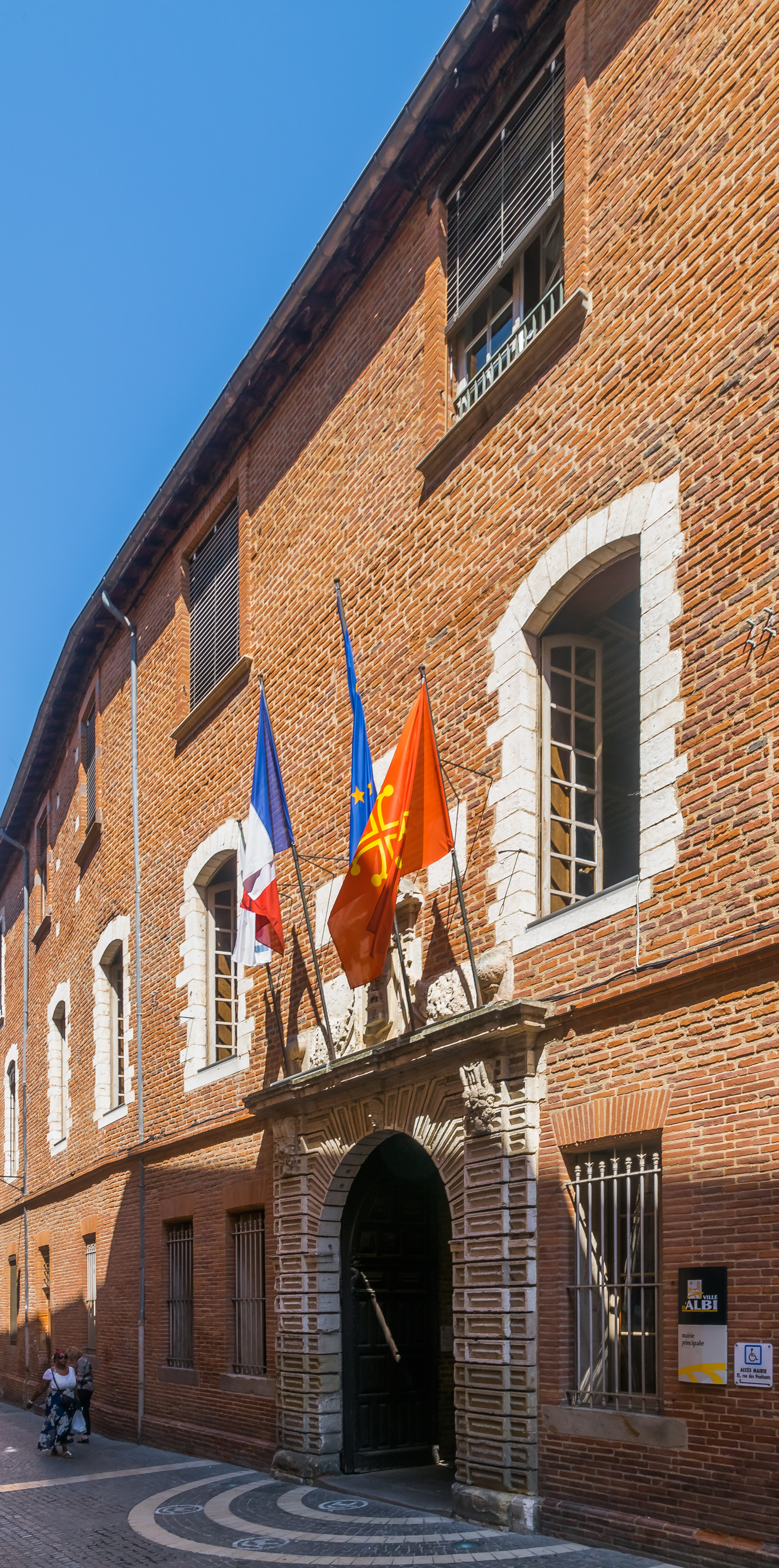
The Hôtel de Ville

The first human settlement in Albi was in the Bronze Age (3000–600 BC). After the Roman conquest of Gaul in 51 BC, the town became Civitas Albigensium, the territory of the Albigeois, Albiga. Archaeological digs have not revealed any traces of Roman buildings, which seems to indicate that Albi was a modest Roman settlement.

In 584, Gregory of Tours reports that the majority of the townsfolk died from plague.

In 1040, Albi expanded and constructed the Pont Vieux (Old Bridge). New quarters were built, indicative of considerable urban growth. The city grew rich at this time, thanks to trade and commercial exchanges, and also to the tolls charged to travelers using the Pont Vieux.

In 1208, the Pope and the French king joined forces to combat the Cathars, who had developed their own version of ascetic Christian dualism, a heresy considered dangerous by the dominant Catholic Church. Repression was severe, and many Cathars were burnt at the stake throughout the region. The area, until then virtually independent, was reduced to such a condition that it was subsequently annexed by the French Crown.

Late in the 13th century, after the upheaval of the Albigensian Crusade against the Cathars, the local bishop, Bernard de Castanet, completed work on the Palais de la Berbie, an episcopal palace with the look of a fortress. Castanet ordered the building of the cathedral of Sainte-Cécile starting in 1282. The town enjoyed a period of commercial prosperity largely due to the cultivation of Isatis Tinctoria, commonly known as woad. The fine houses built during the Renaissance bear witness to the vast fortunes amassed by the pastel merchants.

Albi had a small Jewish community during medieval times, until it was annihilated in the 1320s during the Shepherds' Crusade. Afterward, Jews were allowed only to transit the town by payment, and not to live in it. By 1967, however, about 70 Jews, most of north-African origin, again lived in Albi.

Albi has conserved its architectural heritage which encapsulates the various brilliant periods of its history. Improvement and restoration works have been completed in order to embellish the old quarters. This was to give them a new look, but using the brick for which it is known for. The Hôtel de Ville, also built from this brick, dates back to at least 1682.

== Main sights ==
Albi was built around the original cathedral and episcopal group of buildings. This historic area covers 63 hectares. Red brick and tiles are the main feature of most of the edifices. Along with Toulouse and Montauban, Albi is one of the main cities built in Languedoc-style red brick.

Among the buildings of the town is the Sainte Cécile cathedral, a masterpiece of the Southern Gothic style, built between the 13th and 15th centuries. It is characterised by a strong contrast between its austere, defensive exterior and its sumptuous interior decoration. Built as a statement of the Christian faith after the upheavals of the Cathar heresy, this gigantic brick structure was embellished over the centuries: the Dominique de Florence Doorway, the 78 m high bell tower, the Baldaquin over the entrance (1515–1540). The rood screen is a filigree work in stone in the Flamboyant Gothic style. It is decorated with a magnificent group of polychrome statuary carved by artists from the Burgundian workshops of Cluny and comprising over 200 statues, which have retained their original colours.

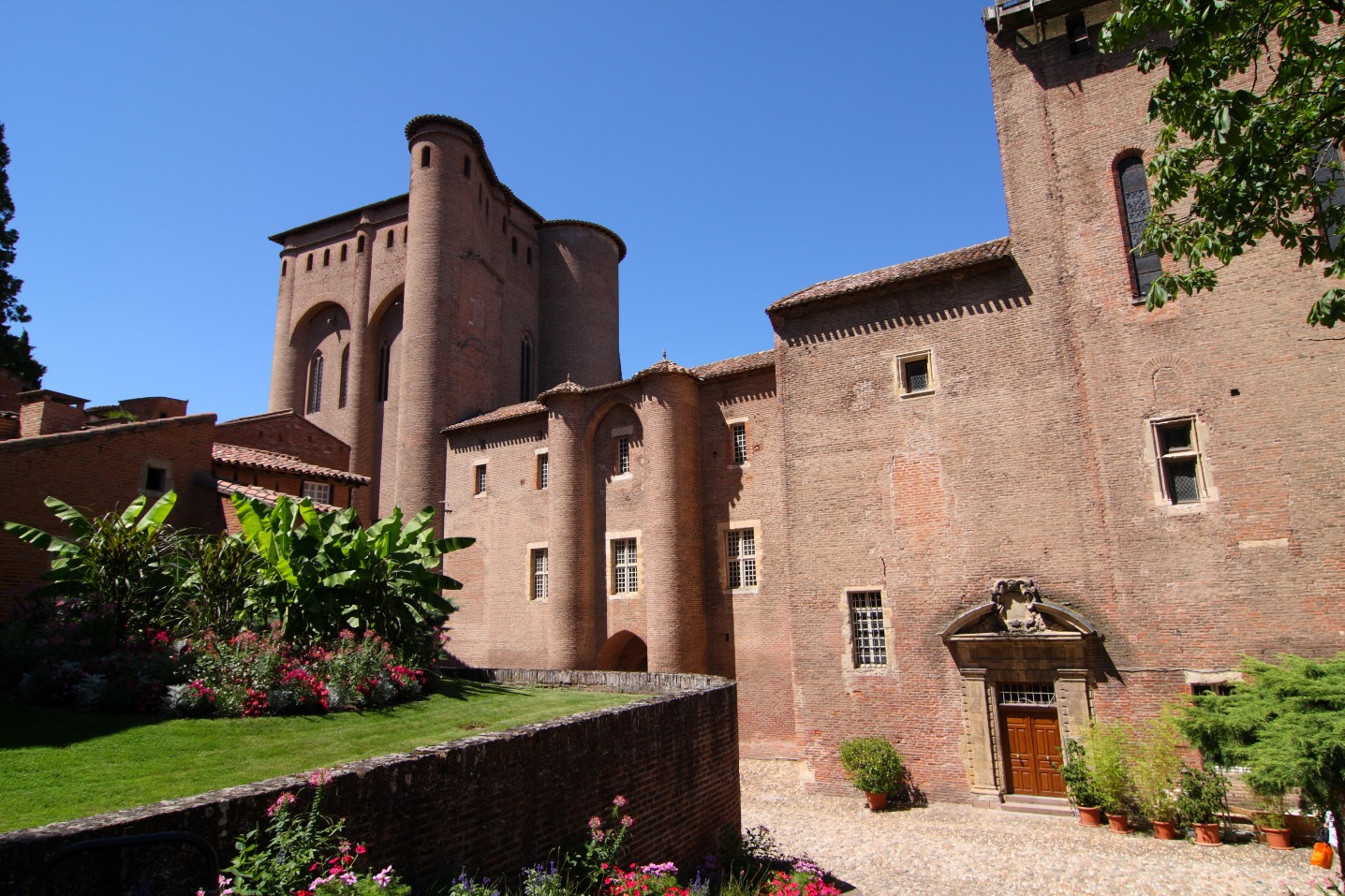
Palais de la Berbie

Older than the Palais des Papes in Avignon, the Palais de la Berbie, formerly the Bishops' Palace of Albi, now the Toulouse-Lautrec Museum, is one of the oldest and best-preserved castles in France. This imposing fortress was completed at the end of the 13th century. Its name comes from the Occitan word Bisbia, meaning Bishops' Palace.

The Old Bridge (Pont Vieux) is still in use after almost a millennium. Originally built in stone (in 1035), then clad with brick, it rests on eight arches and is 151 m long. In the 14th century, it was fortified and reinforced with a drawbridge, and houses were built on the piers.

Albi is a city known for its elite Lycée Lapérouse, a high school with 500 students situated inside an old monastery. It has several advanced literature classes. Furthermore, it is one of the few holding a full-scale music section with special high-tech rooms for this section. The Pacific explorer Jean-François de Galaup, comte de Lapérouse is commemorated in the museum.

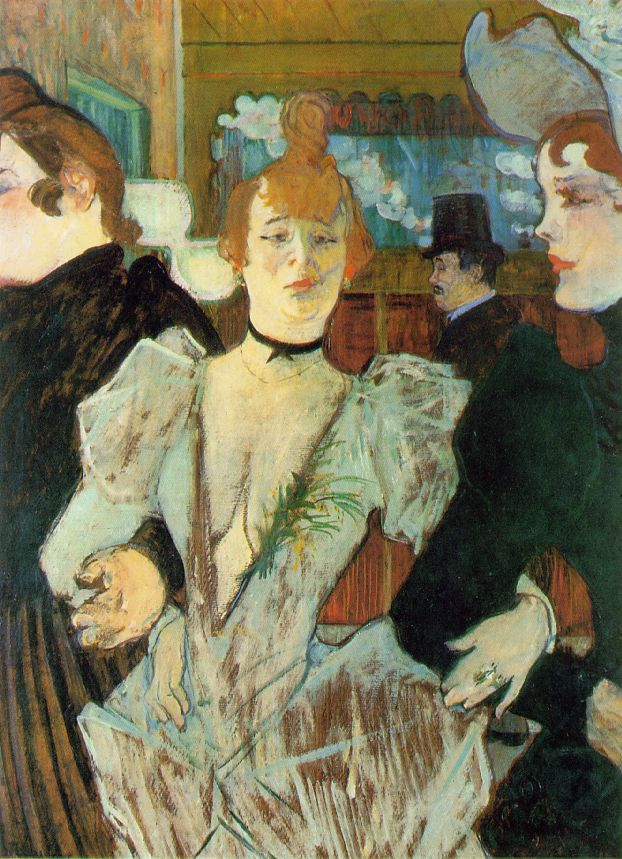
La Goulue arriving at the Moulin Rouge, by Toulouse-Lautrec (1892)

Located in an ancient mill (41 rue Porta), the Le LAIT Art Centre is a research laboratory dedicated to contemporary art.

=== Henri de Toulouse-Lautrec ===
The Toulouse-Lautrec Museum houses more than 1000 works, including 31 famous posters. This body of work forms the largest public collection in the world devoted to Henri de Toulouse-Lautrec, who was born in Albi in 1864.

=== World Heritage Site ===
UNESCO's World Heritage Centre notes the Old Bridge (Pont-Vieux), the Saint-Salvi quarter, the quarter's church, the fortified cathedral (late 13th century) in unique southern French Gothic style from local brick, the bishop's Palais de la Berbie, and residential quarters, which help the Episcopal City of Albi form a "coherent and homogeneous ensemble of monuments and quarters that has remained largely unchanged over the centuries... a complete built ensemble representative of a type of urban development in Europe from the Middle Ages to the present day."

== Transport ==
Albi is served by two railway stations on the line from Toulouse to Rodez:

- Gare d'Albi-Ville
- Gare d'Albi-Madeleine

The A68 motorway connects Albi with Toulouse (and Lyon N 88, future motorway).

The nearest airport is Toulouse-Blagnac Airport, located 84 km (52 mi) south west of Albi.

== Sport ==
- SC Albi – The city's rugby union team competing in the second-level Rugby Pro D2.
- RC Albi – A rugby league team that compete in the Elite One Championship.
- US Albi – A Union Sports Football Club established in 1912 in Albi playing the Regional 2 Level.
- Albi held Stage 13 of the 2007 Tour de France. The stage was a 55 km (34 mi) individual time trial which started and finished in the city.
- Albi was the finish of Stage 10 of the 2019 Tour de France on Mon 15 July. There was a rest day at Albi on the 16th and Albi was the start of stage 11 to Toulouse On Weds 18 July.
- Albi was the finish of Stage 5 of the 2023 Tour de France Femmes avec Zwift on Thursday, 27 July. The winner of the stage was Ricarda Bauernfeind (Germany) of Team Canyon/Sram Racing. Bauernfeind was riding in her Tour debut.
- Circuit d'Albi, a motor racing circuit used for national racing surrounding Albi's airport.

== Education ==
- École des mines d'Albi-Carmaux
- Jean-François Champollion University Center for Teaching and Research

== Climate ==
Albi experiences a humid subtropical climate (Köppen climate classification Cfa) bordering oceanic climate (Cfb). Like much of southwestern France, the summers tend to be warmer and the winters milder than most areas of similar classification. Substantial summer rainfall prevents its climate from being classified as Mediterranean.

Climate data for Albi (1991–2020 normals, extremes 1976–present)
Month	Jan	Feb	Mar	Apr	May	Jun	Jul	Aug	Sep	Oct	Nov	Dec	Year
Record high °C (°F)	19.5 (67.1)	24.7 (76.5)	28.3 (82.9)	30.1 (86.2)	35.4 (95.7)	41.6 (106.9)	41.5 (106.7)	42.3 (108.1)	36.5 (97.7)	34.3 (93.7)	25.3 (77.5)	21.0 (69.8)	42.3 (108.1)
Mean daily maximum °C (°F)	9.7 (49.5)	11.4 (52.5)	15.3 (59.5)	18.1 (64.6)	22.0 (71.6)	26.1 (79.0)	28.8 (83.8)	29.1 (84.4)	24.9 (76.8)	20.0 (68.0)	13.5 (56.3)	10.3 (50.5)	19.1 (66.4)
Daily mean °C (°F)	5.8 (42.4)	6.5 (43.7)	9.8 (49.6)	12.4 (54.3)	16.3 (61.3)	20.2 (68.4)	22.5 (72.5)	22.6 (72.7)	18.7 (65.7)	14.8 (58.6)	9.3 (48.7)	6.3 (43.3)	13.8 (56.8)
Mean daily minimum °C (°F)	1.9 (35.4)	1.7 (35.1)	4.2 (39.6)	6.7 (44.1)	10.5 (50.9)	14.2 (57.6)	16.1 (61.0)	16.1 (61.0)	12.6 (54.7)	9.6 (49.3)	5.2 (41.4)	2.3 (36.1)	8.4 (47.1)
Record low °C (°F)	−20.4 (−4.7)	−12.0 (10.4)	−9.8 (14.4)	−3.6 (25.5)	−0.2 (31.6)	4.3 (39.7)	6.5 (43.7)	4.9 (40.8)	1.0 (33.8)	−2.7 (27.1)	−9.4 (15.1)	−10.5 (13.1)	−20.4 (−4.7)
Average precipitation mm (inches)	60.7 (2.39)	48.6 (1.91)	54.8 (2.16)	80.4 (3.17)	78.9 (3.11)	62.7 (2.47)	45.8 (1.80)	49.0 (1.93)	57.1 (2.25)	64.9 (2.56)	65.5 (2.58)	65.5 (2.58)	733.9 (28.89)
Average precipitation days (≥ 1.0 mm)	10.8	8.6	9.1	10.1	9.3	7.4	6.1	6.1	7.0	8.7	10.2	10.6	103.9
Mean monthly sunshine hours	90.5	119.7	175.0	187.9	219.4	247.4	275.5	263.1	215.8	155.9	95.9	88.1	2,134.2
Source: Meteociel

== Population ==
Historical population

Year	Pop.	±% p.a.
1793	11,176	—
1800	9,649	−2.08%
1806	10,061	+0.70%
1821	10,644	+0.38%
1831	11,665	+0.92%
1836	11,801	+0.23%
1841	12,408	+1.01%
1846	14,211	+2.75%
1851	13,788	−0.60%
1856	14,636	+1.20%
1861	15,493	+1.14%
1866	16,596	+1.38%
1872	17,469	+0.86%
1876	19,169	+2.35%
1881	20,379	+1.23%
1886	21,224	+0.82%
1891	20,903	−0.30%
1896	21,948	+0.98%
1901	22,571	+0.56%

Year	Pop.	±% p.a.
1906	23,303	+0.64%
1911	25,100	+1.50%
1921	26,628	+0.59%
1926	29,015	+1.73%
1931	29,351	+0.23%
1936	30,293	+0.63%
1946	34,342	+1.26%
1954	34,693	+0.13%
1962	38,709	+1.38%
1968	42,930	+1.74%
1975	46,162	+1.04%
1982	45,947	−0.07%
1990	46,579	+0.17%
1999	46,274	−0.07%
2007	48,889	+0.69%
2012	49,231	+0.14%
2017	48,970	−0.11%
2023	51,290	+0.77%

Source: EHESS and INSEE (1968-2023)

== Twin towns – sister cities ==
Albi is twinned with:

- Girona, Spain
- Palo Alto, United States
- Randwick, Australia

== Notable people ==
- Antoinette de Saliès (1639–1730), writer, feminist
- Jean-François de Galaup, comte de Lapérouse (1741–1788), Pacific explorer
- Raymond Adolphe Séré de Rivières (1815–1895), military engineer and general
- Henri de Toulouse-Lautrec (1864–1901), painter, caricaturist, illustrator
- Pierre Benoit (1886–1962), novelist, screenwriter
- Isabelle Candelier (born 1963), actress

== Gallery ==
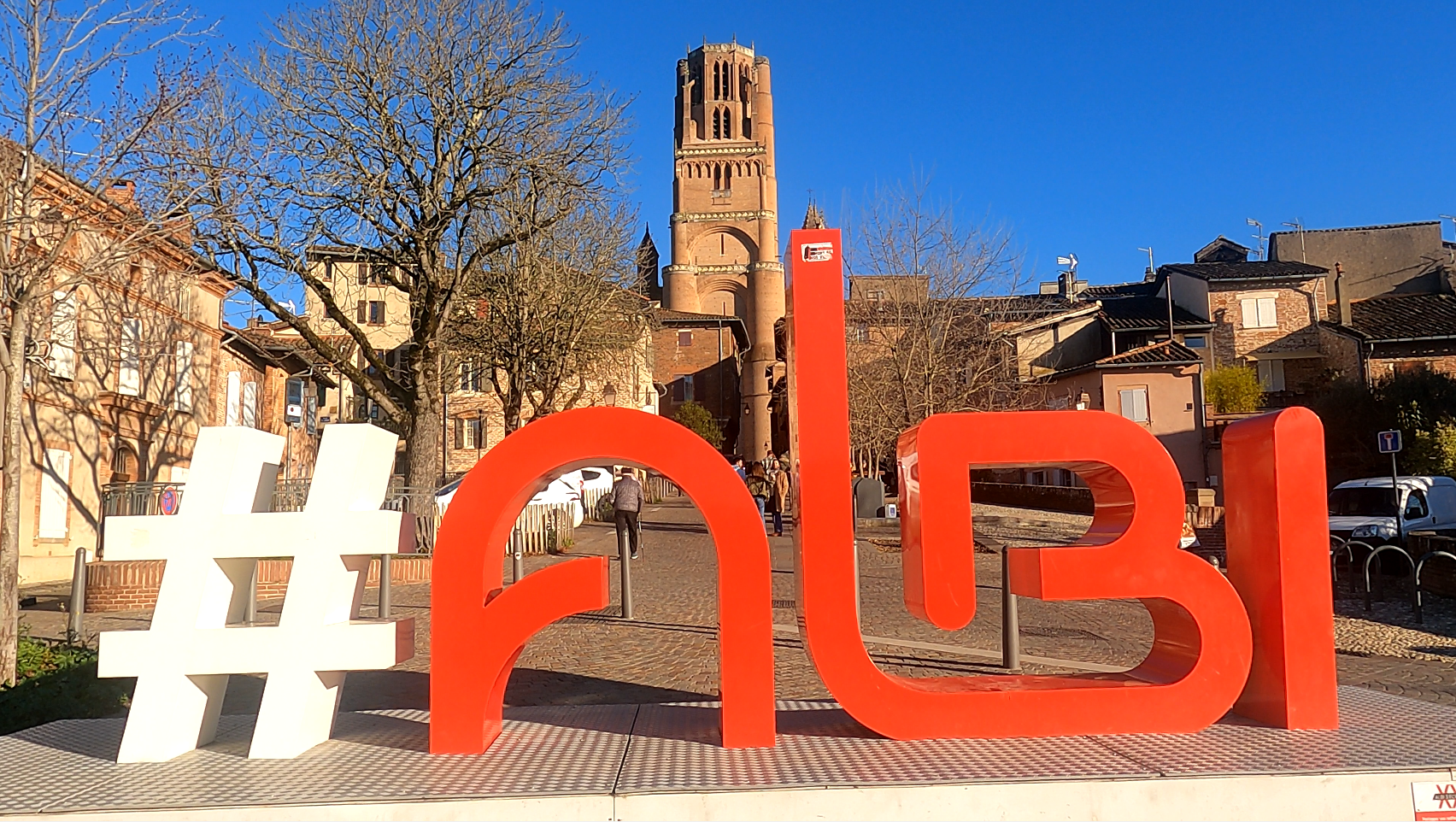
Albi

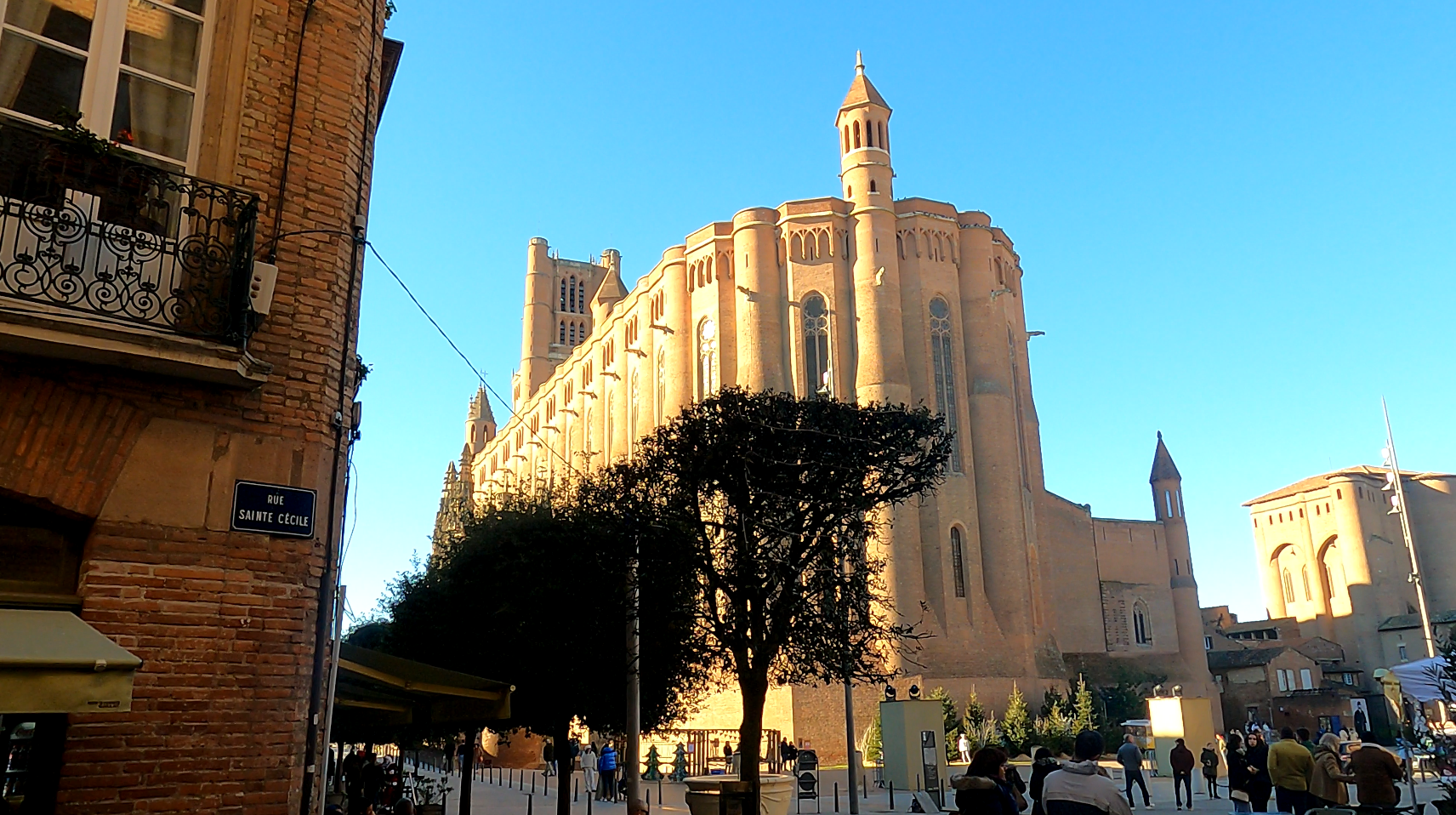
Albi cathedral

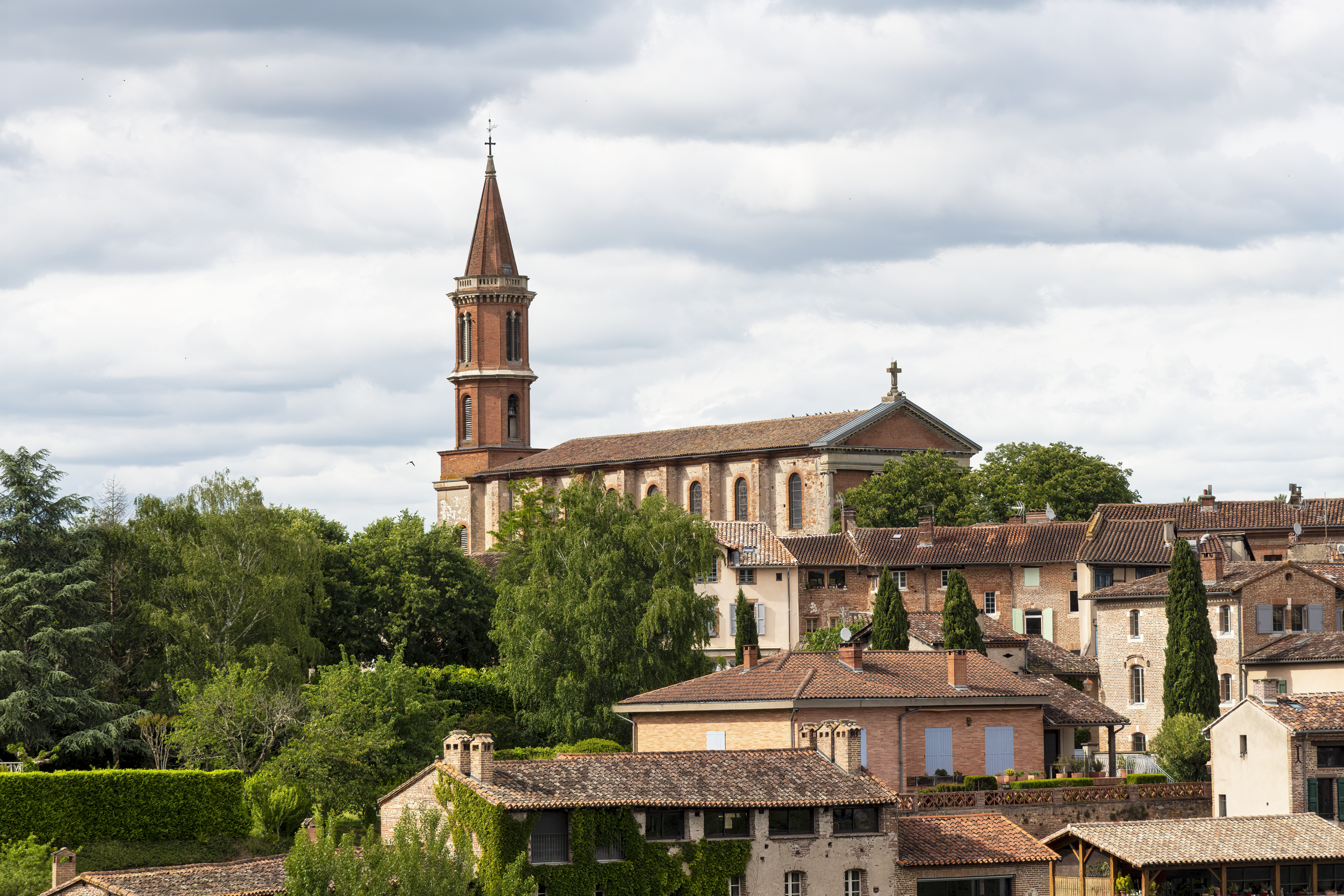
St-Madeleine Church, Albi

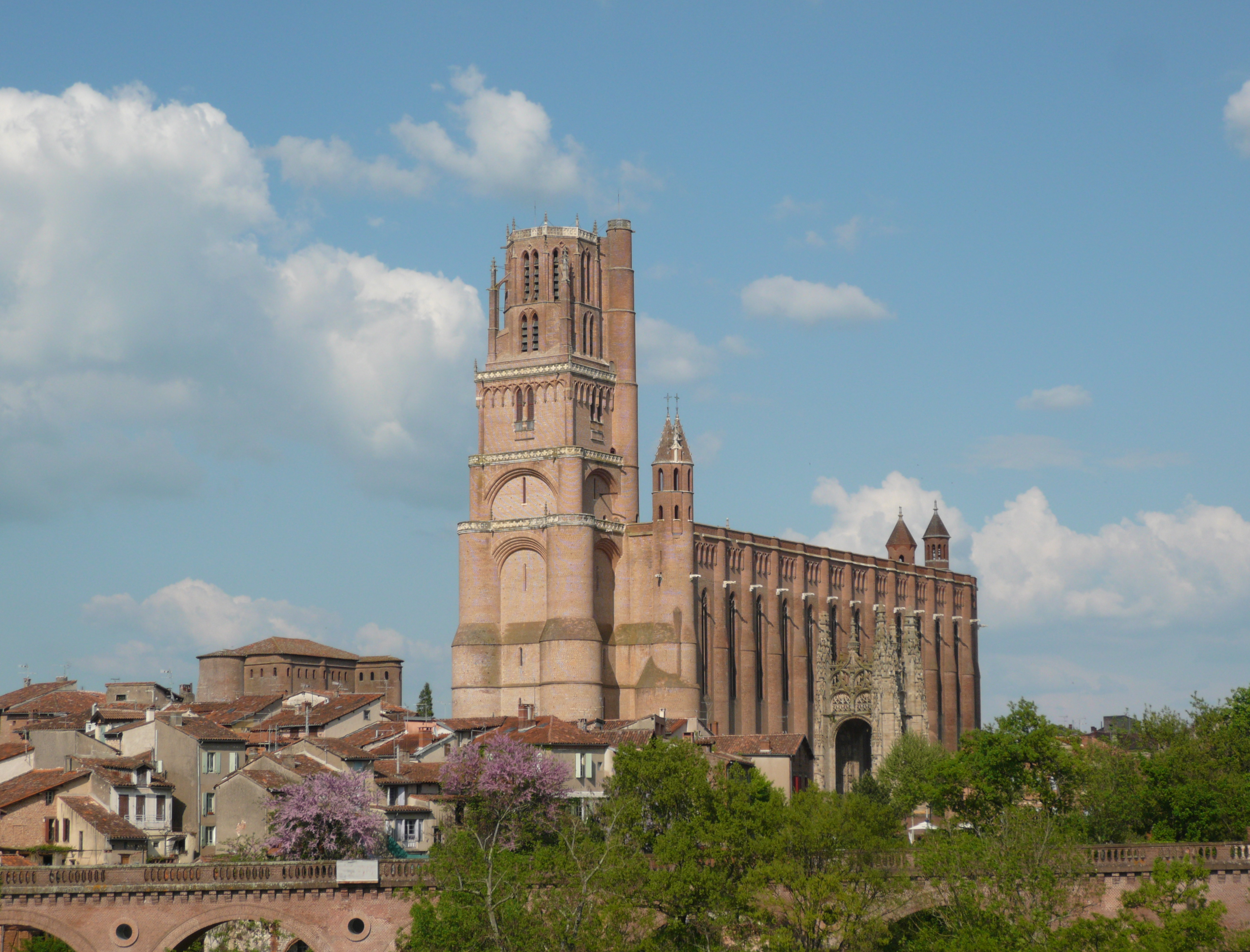
Cathédrale Sainte-Cécile

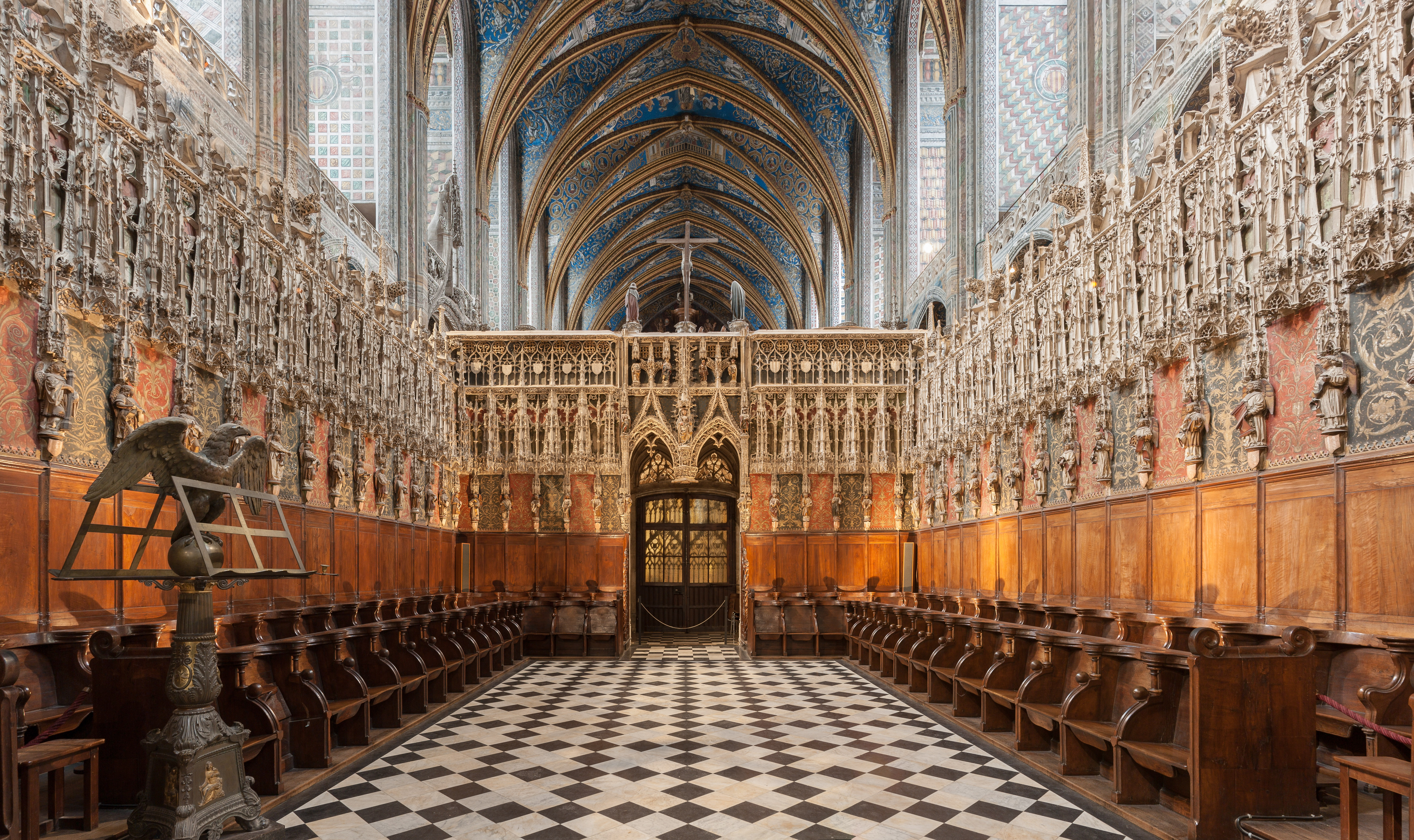
The choir of the cathedral

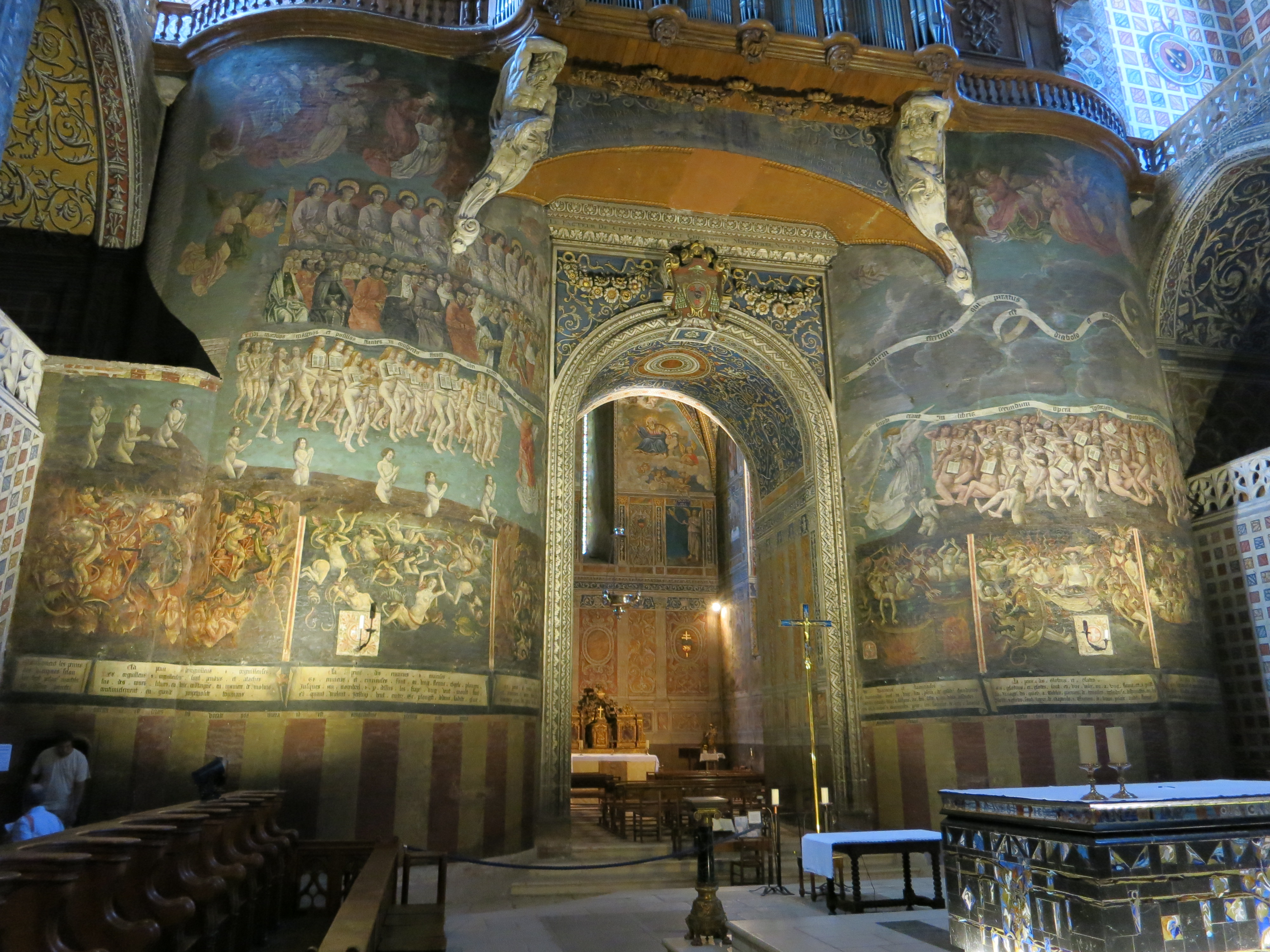
In the cathedral, paintings of the Last Judgement

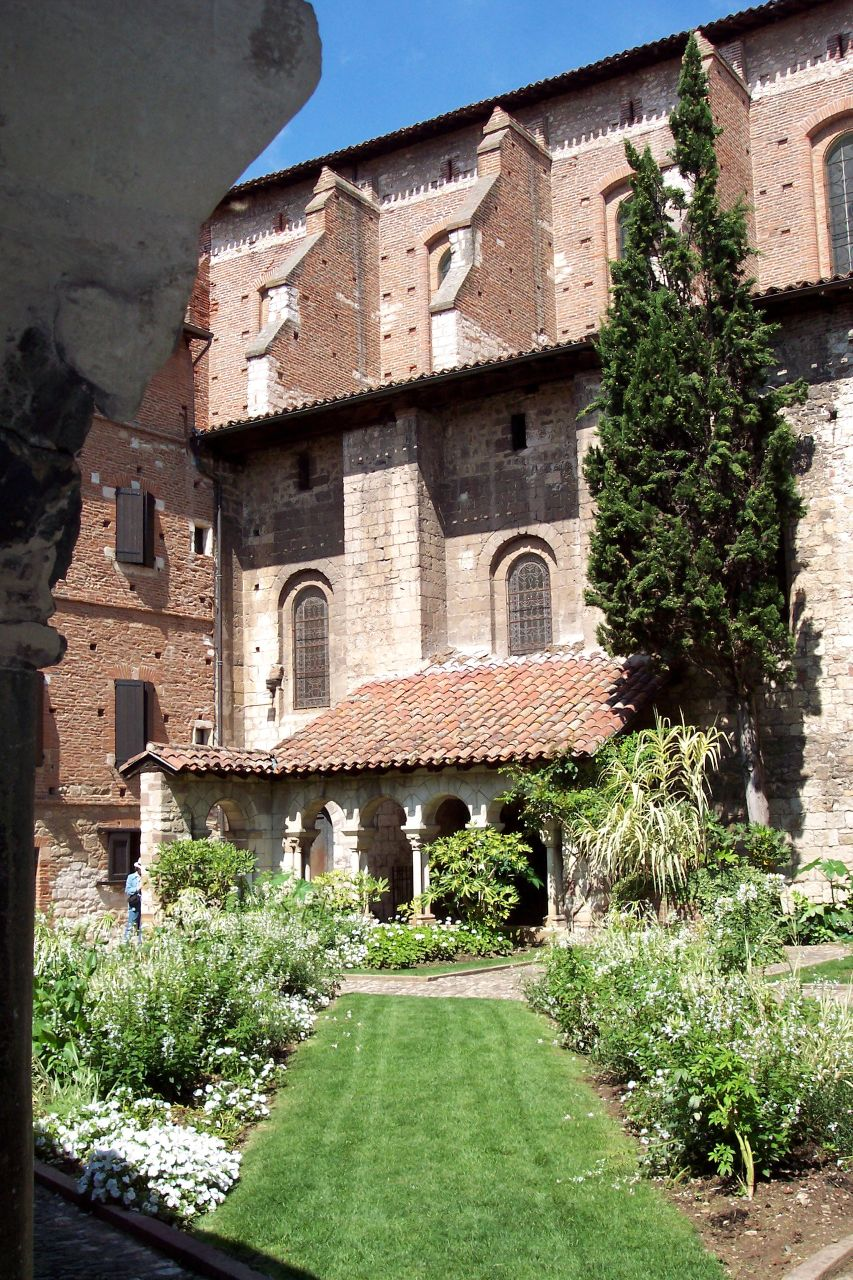
Collégiale Saint-Salvi, the oldest church in Albi, dedicated to Saint Salvius

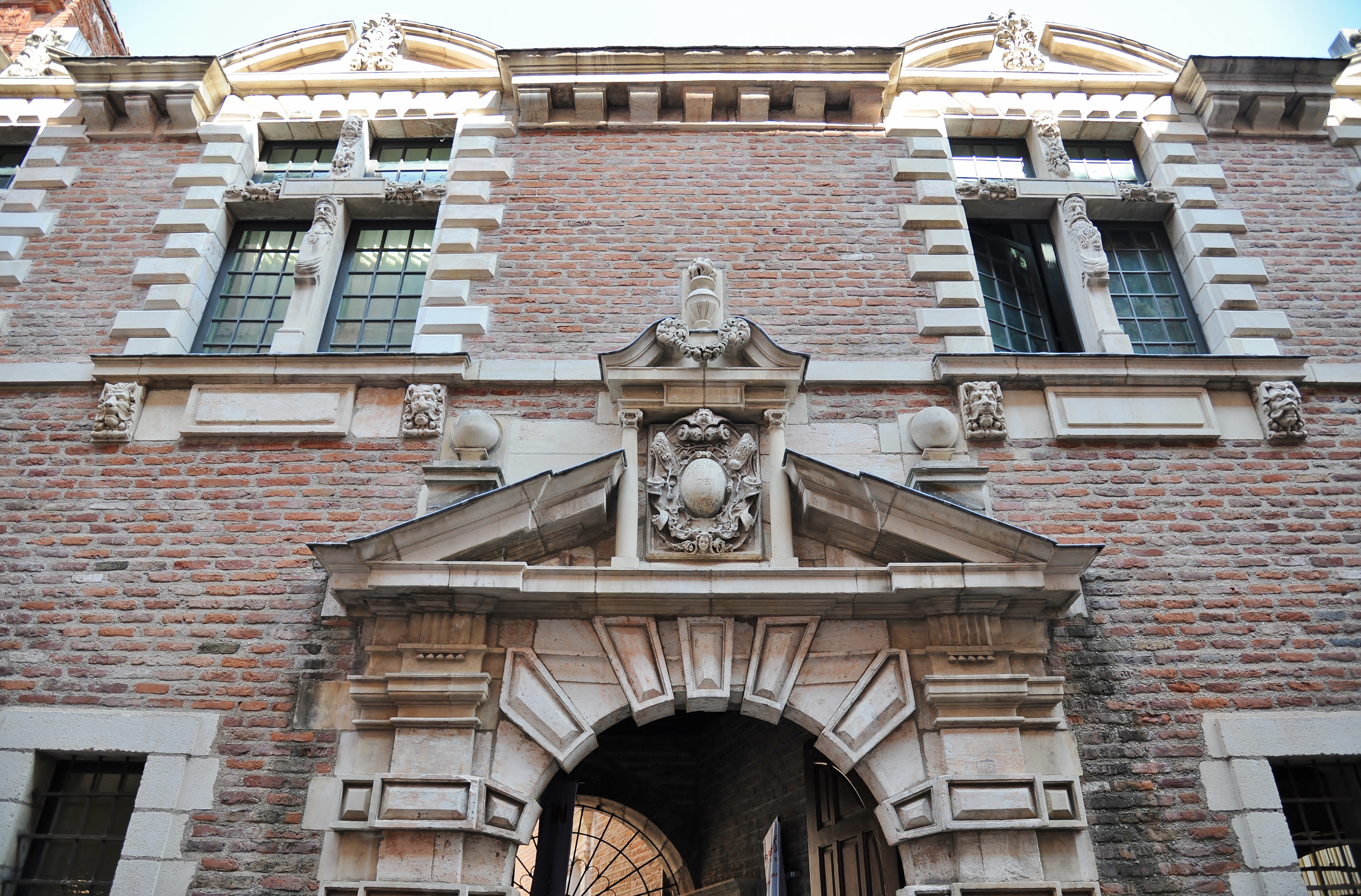
Hôtel Reynès (Renaissance)

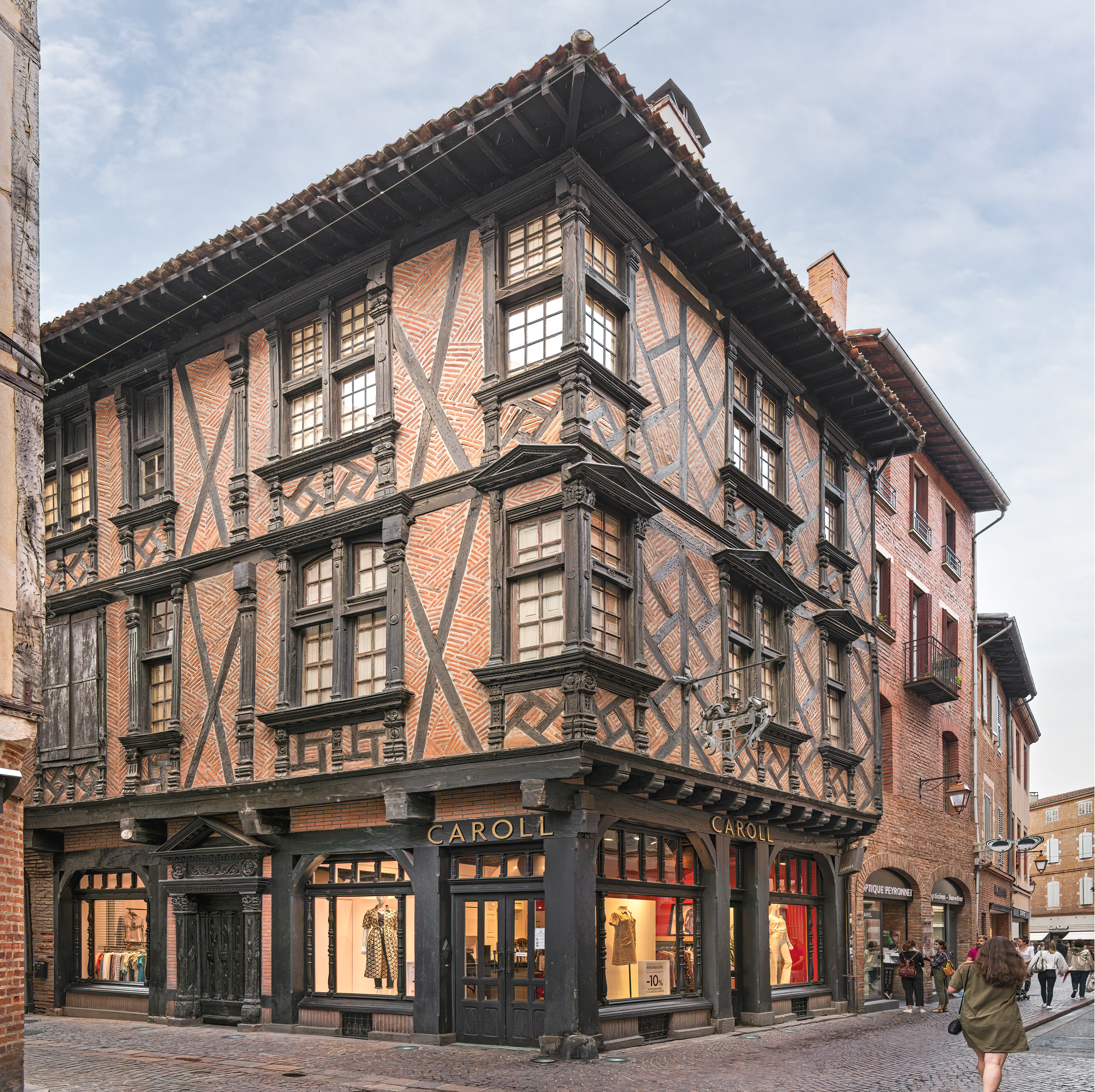
Maison Enjalbert (Renaissance)

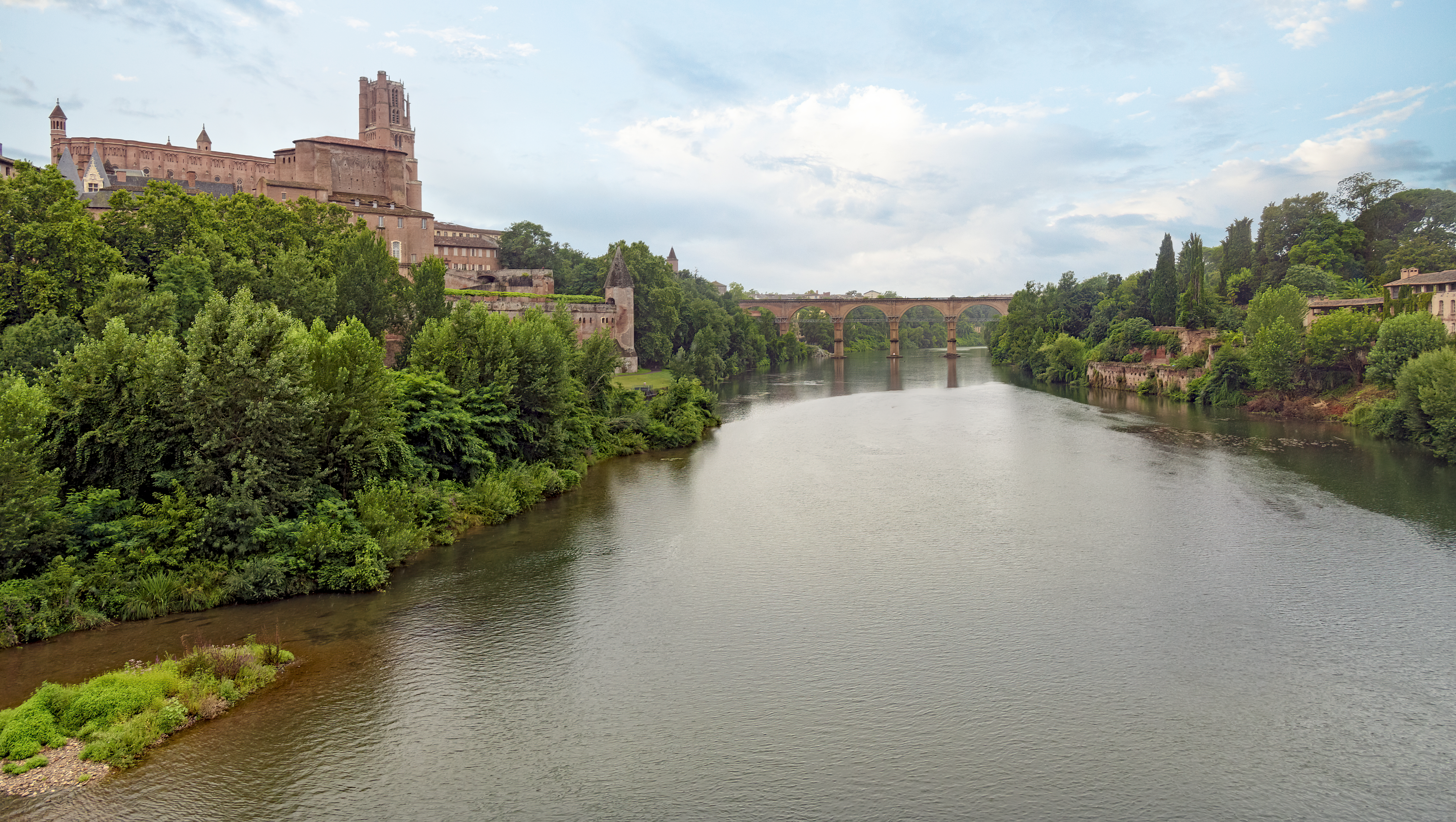
Tarn river in Albi

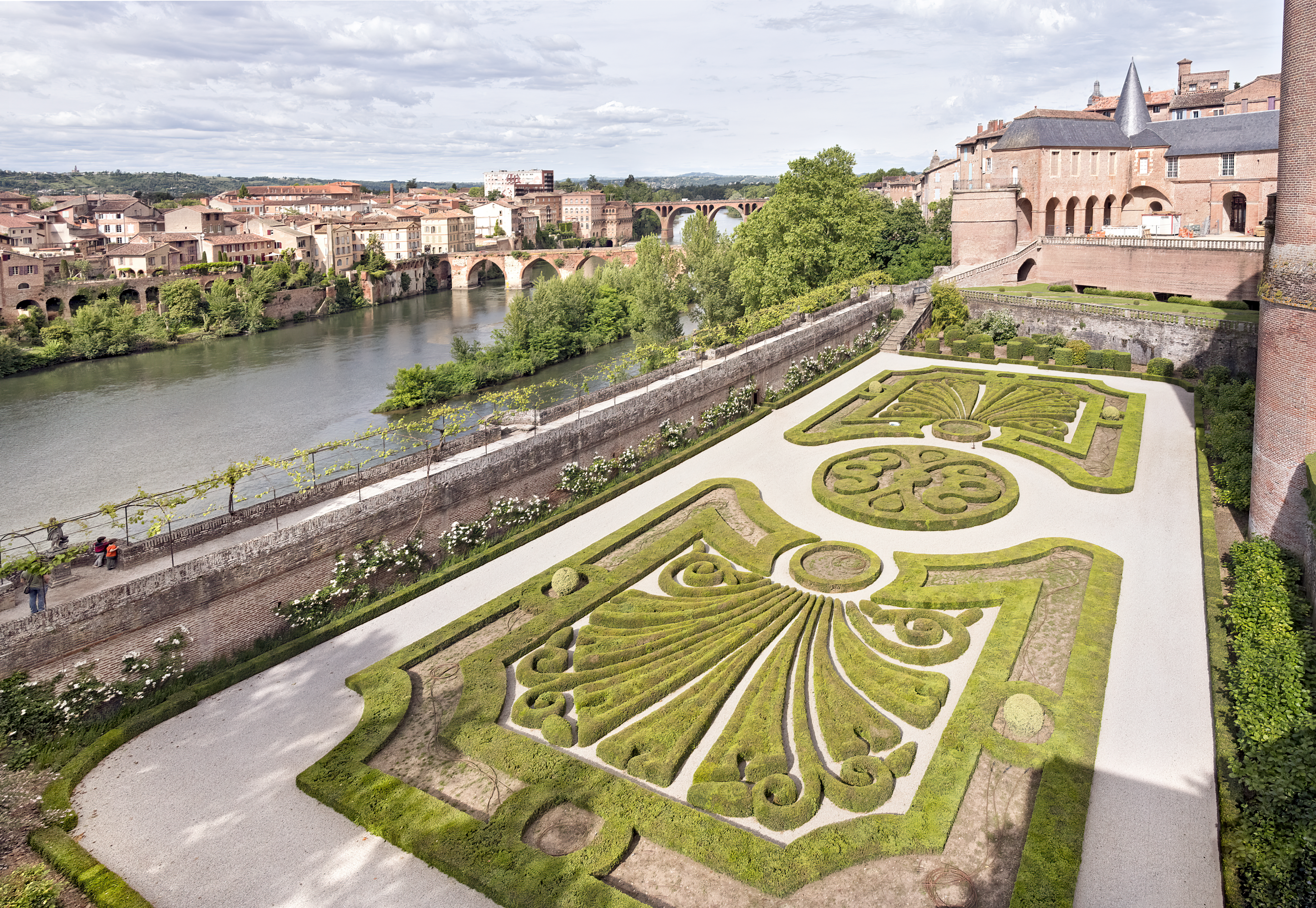

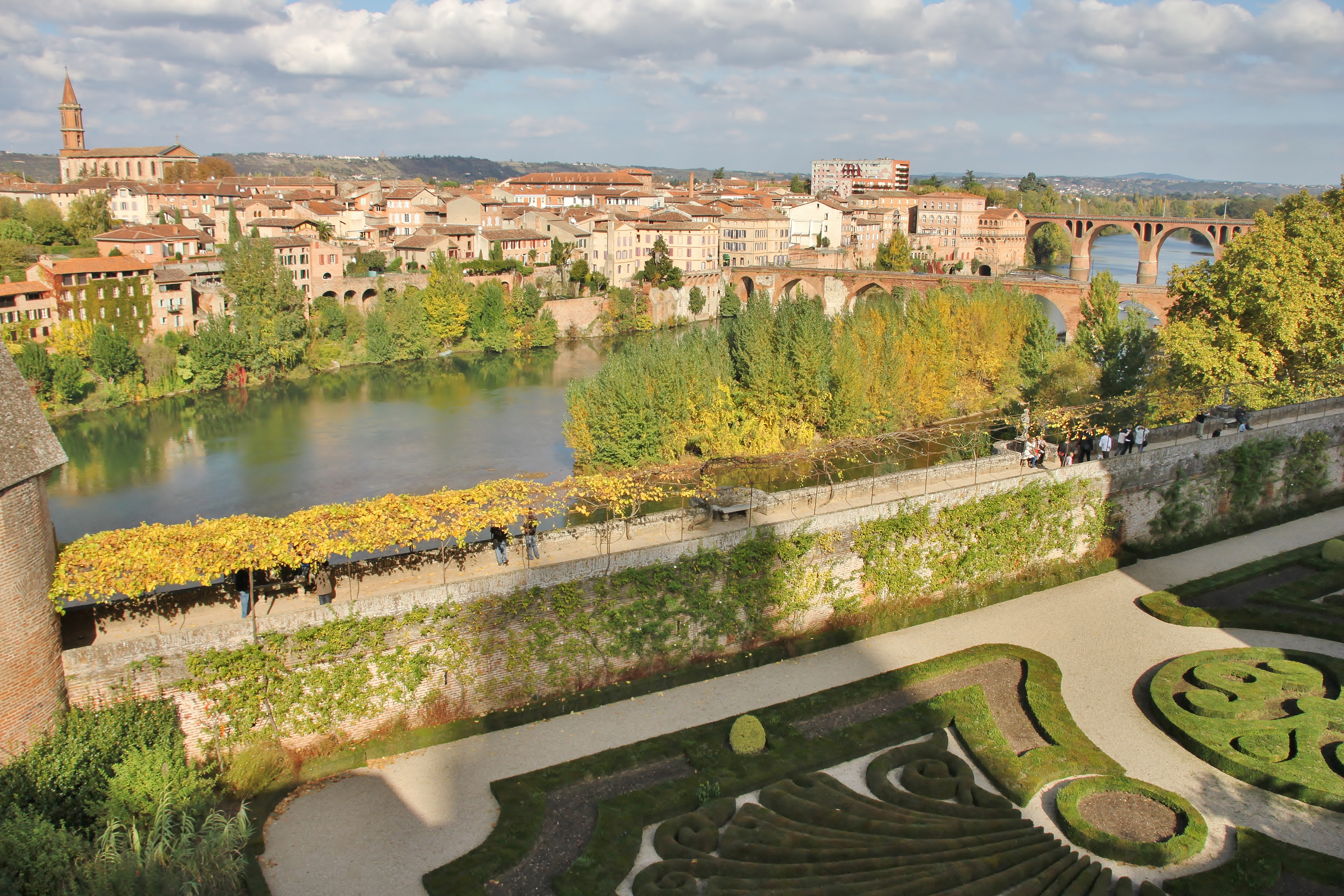
Banks of the Tarn river

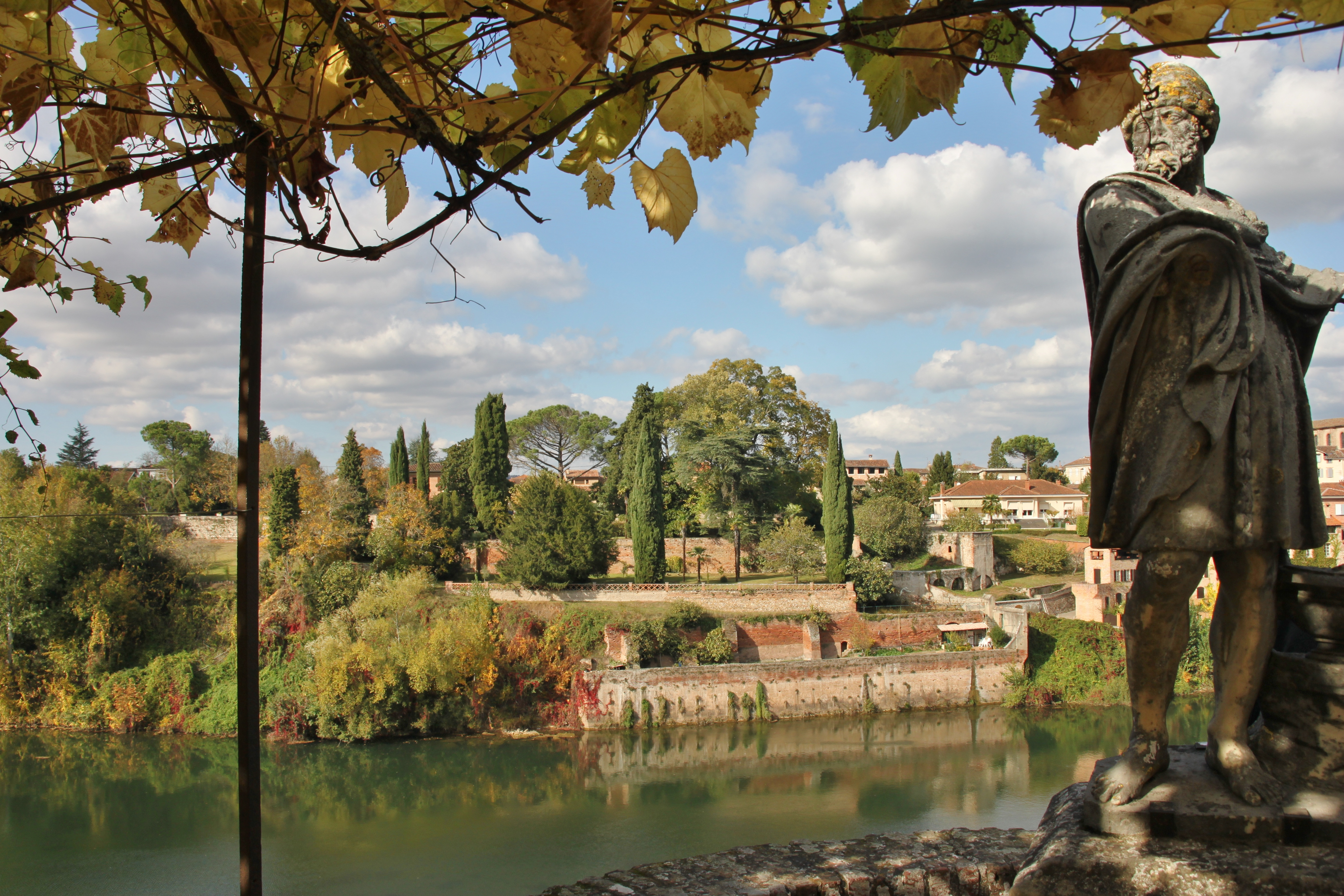
Banks of the Tarn river

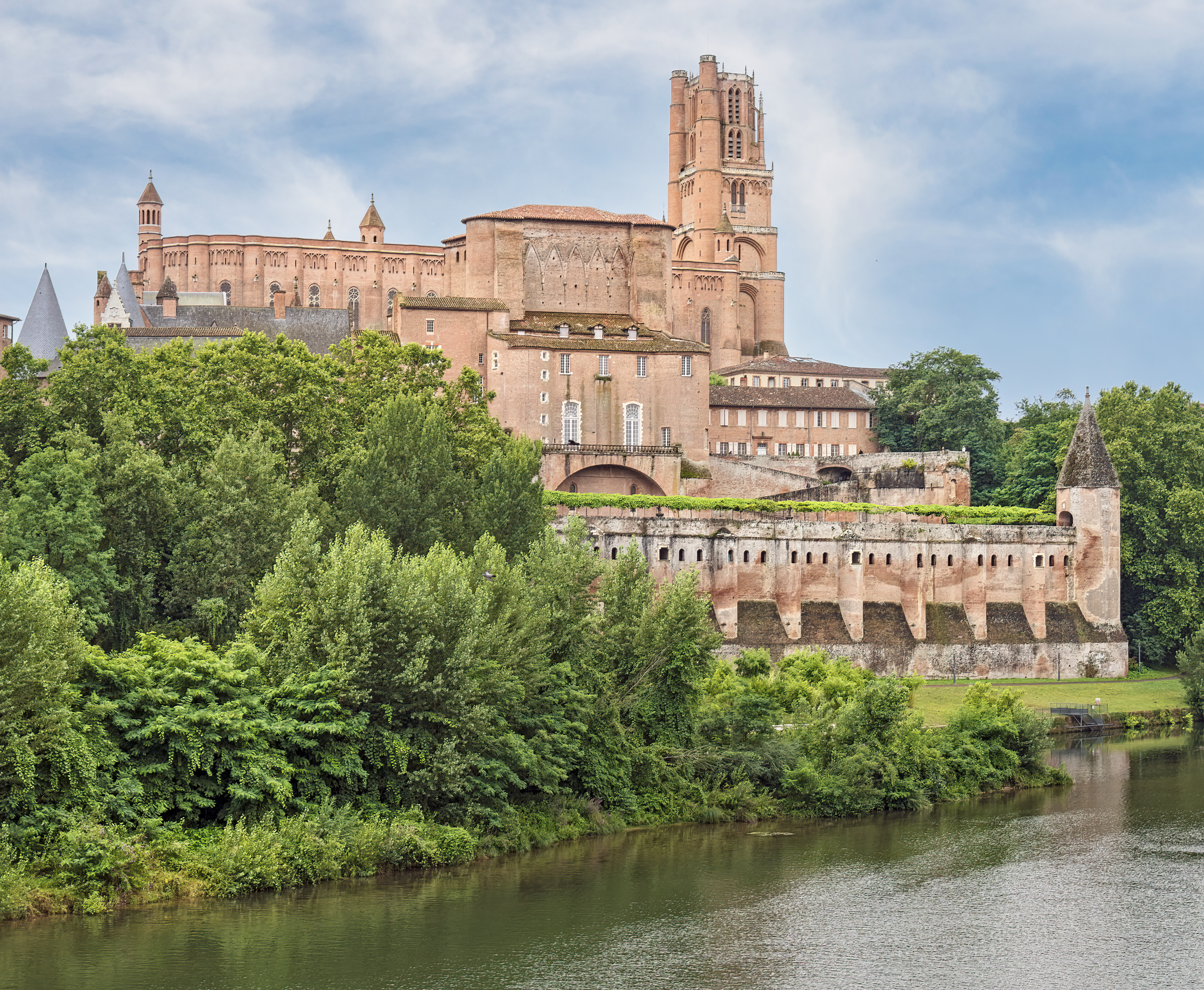

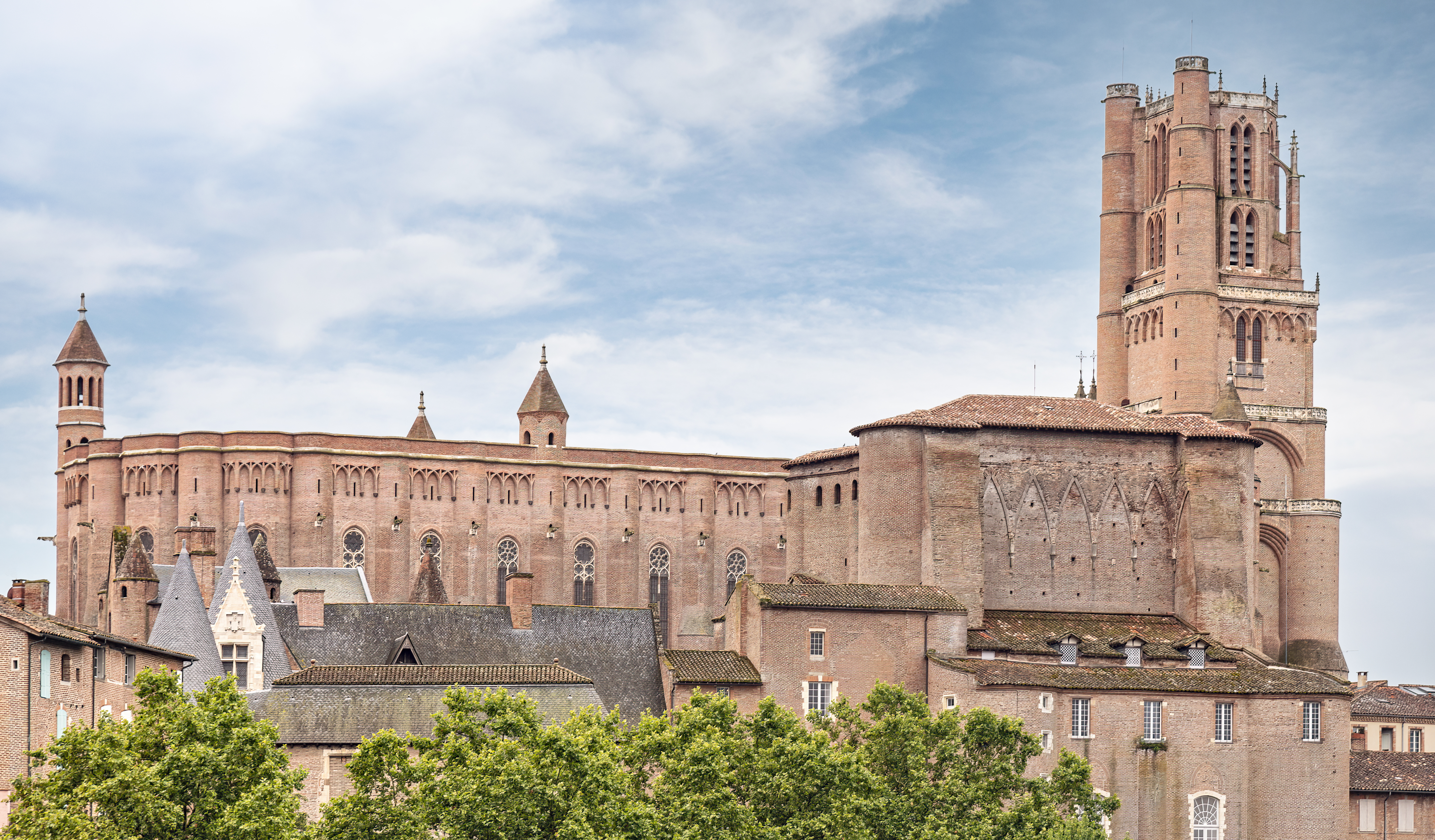

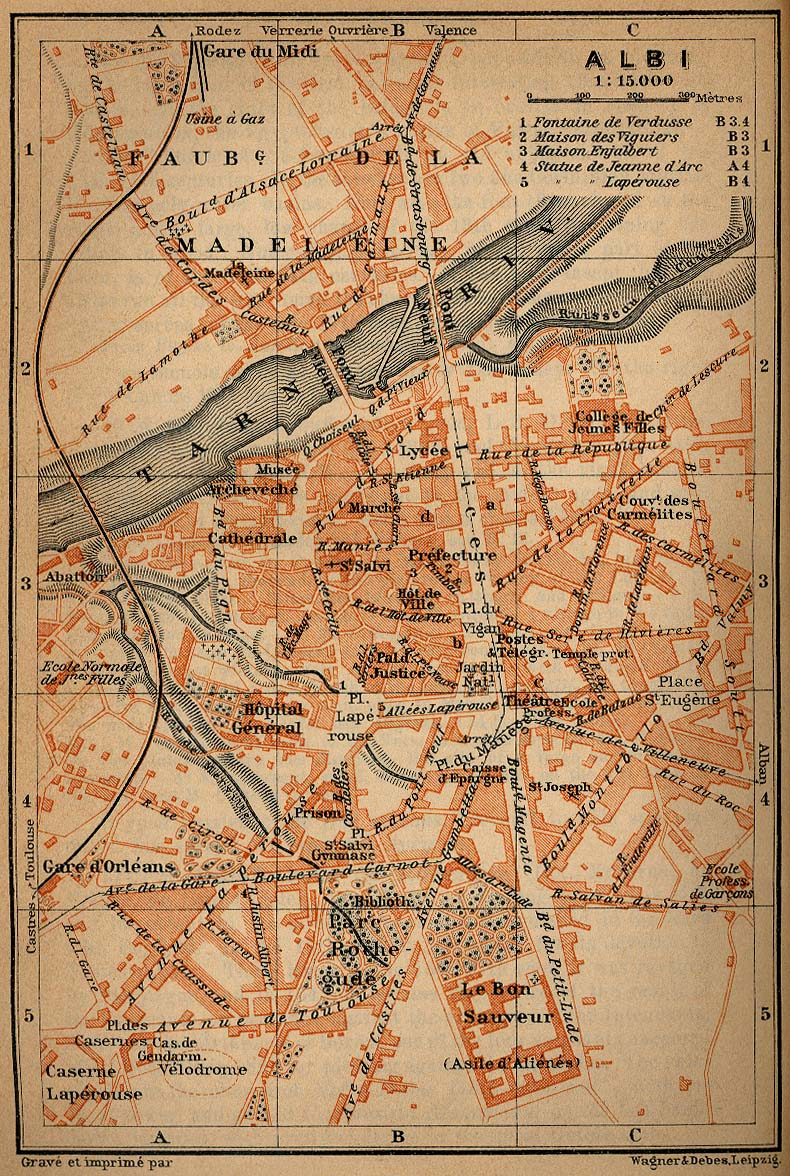
Map of Albi, 1914

== See also ==
- Lion and Sun
- Tourism in Tarn
