= Carlus =

- Commune
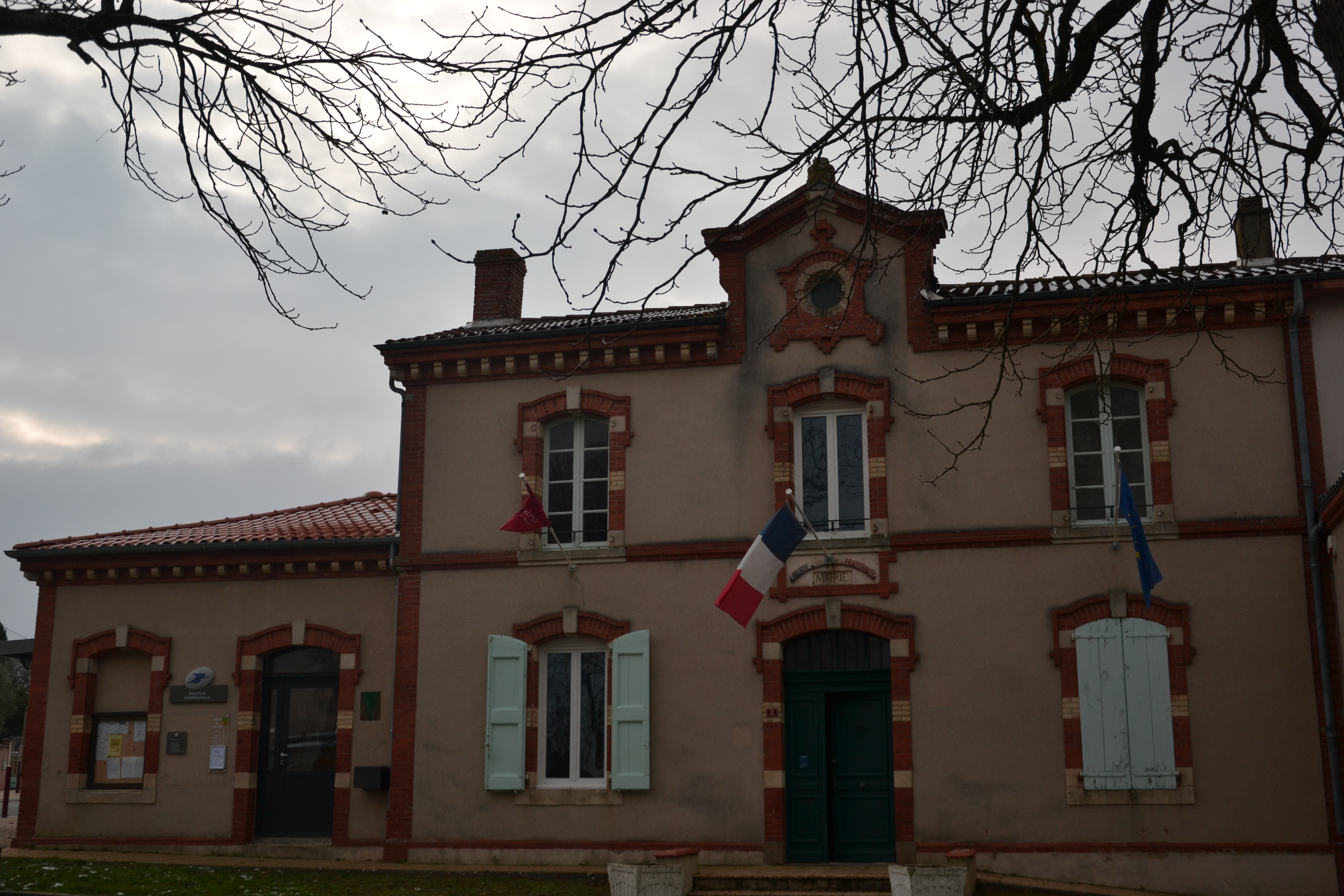
- Carlus Town hall

- Coat of arms
- Location of Carlus
- Location within France Location within Occitanie
- Coordinates: 43°53′19″N 2°06′33″E
- Country: France
- Region: Occitania
- Department: Tarn
- Arrondissement: Albi
- Canton: Albi-2
- Intercommunality: CA Albigeois
- Area^{1}: 10.6 km^{2} (4.1 sq mi)
- Elevation: 245 m (804 ft)
- Highest elevation: 282 m (925 ft)
- Lowest elevation: 164 m (538 ft)
- Population (2023): 664
  - Density: 62.6/km^{2} (162/sq mi)
- Time zone: UTC+01:00 (CET)
  - Summer (DST): UTC+02:00 (CEST)
- INSEE/Postal code: 81059 /81990
- ^{1} French Land Register data, which excludes lakes, ponds, glaciers > 1 km^{2} (0.386 sq mi or 247 acres) and river estuaries.

Carlus is a commune in the Tarn department in southern France.

== See also ==
- Communes of the Tarn department
