= Le Sequestre =

- Commune
- Location of Le Sequestre
- Location within France Location within Occitanie
- Coordinates: 43°55′05″N 2°05′56″E
- Country: France
- Region: Occitania
- Department: Tarn
- Arrondissement: Albi
- Canton: Albi-2
- Intercommunality: CA Albigeois

Government
  - Mayor (2020–2026): Gérard Poujade
- Area^{1}: 5.42 km^{2} (2.09 sq mi)
- Elevation: 175 m (574 ft)
- Highest elevation: 256 m (840 ft)
- Lowest elevation: 162 m (531 ft)
- Population (2023): 2,025
  - Density: 374/km^{2} (968/sq mi)
- Time zone: UTC+01:00 (CET)
  - Summer (DST): UTC+02:00 (CEST)
- INSEE/Postal code: 81284 /81990
- ^{1} French Land Register data, which excludes lakes, ponds, glaciers > 1 km^{2} (0.386 sq mi or 247 acres) and river estuaries.

Le Sequestre (French pronunciation: [lə sekɛstʁ]; also Le Séquestre; Occitan: Lo Sequèstre) is a commune in the Tarn department in southern France.

== Population ==
Historical population
Year	Pop.	±% p.a.
1968	612	—
1975	697	+1.88%
1982	622	−1.61%
1990	925	+5.09%
1999	1,336	+4.17%
2007	1,570	+2.04%
2012	1,509	−0.79%
2017	1,809	+3.69%
2023	2,025	+1.90%
Source: INSEE

== See also ==
- Communes of the Tarn department
