= Saliès =

- Commune
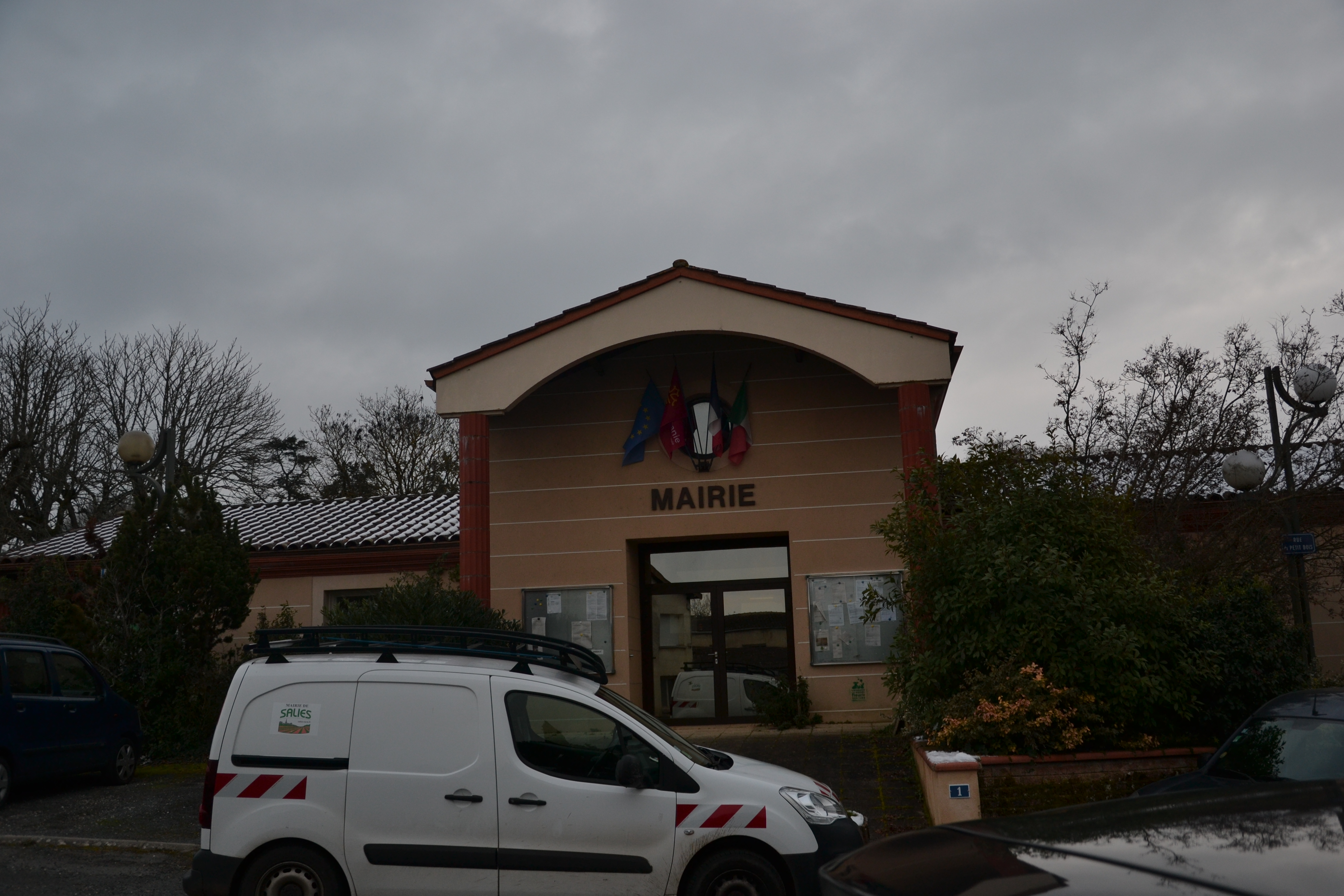
- Location of Saliès
- Location within France Location within Occitanie
- Coordinates: 43°53′28″N 2°07′44″E
- Country: France
- Region: Occitania
- Department: Tarn
- Arrondissement: Albi
- Canton: Albi-2
- Intercommunality: CA Albigeois

Government
  - Mayor (2020–2026): Jean-François Rochedreux
- Area^{1}: 3.55 km^{2} (1.37 sq mi)
- Elevation: 241 m (791 ft)
- Highest elevation: 274 m (899 ft)
- Lowest elevation: 182 m (597 ft)
- Population (2023): 806
  - Density: 227/km^{2} (588/sq mi)
- Time zone: UTC+01:00 (CET)
  - Summer (DST): UTC+02:00 (CEST)
- INSEE/Postal code: 81274 /81990
- ^{1} French Land Register data, which excludes lakes, ponds, glaciers > 1 km^{2} (0.386 sq mi or 247 acres) and river estuaries.

Saliès (French pronunciation: [saljɛs]; Occitan: Salièrs) is a commune in the Tarn department in southern France.

== Notable people ==
- Antoinette de Saliès (1639–1730), writer, feminist

== See also ==
- Communes of the Tarn department
