= Rouffiac, Tarn =

Rouffiac
- Commune
- Coat of arms
- Location of Rouffiac
- Location within France Location within Occitanie
- Coordinates: 43°53′02″N 2°04′08″E
- Country: France
- Region: Occitania
- Department: Tarn
- Arrondissement: Albi
- Canton: Albi-2
- Intercommunality: CA Albigeois

Government
  - Mayor (2020–2026): Michel Trébosc
- Area^{1}: 11.13 km^{2} (4.30 sq mi)
- Elevation: 185 m (607 ft)
- Highest elevation: 271 m (889 ft)
- Lowest elevation: 165 m (541 ft)
- Population (2023): 639
  - Density: 57.4/km^{2} (149/sq mi)
- Time zone: UTC+01:00 (CET)
  - Summer (DST): UTC+02:00 (CEST)
- INSEE/Postal code: 81232 /81150
- ^{1} French Land Register data, which excludes lakes, ponds, glaciers > 1 km^{2} (0.386 sq mi or 247 acres) and river estuaries.

Rouffiac (French pronunciation: [ʁufjak]; Occitan: Rofiac) is a commune in the Tarn department in southern France.

== See also ==
- Communes of the Tarn department
