= Hôtel de Ville, Albi =

Town hall in Albi, France

Hôtel de Ville
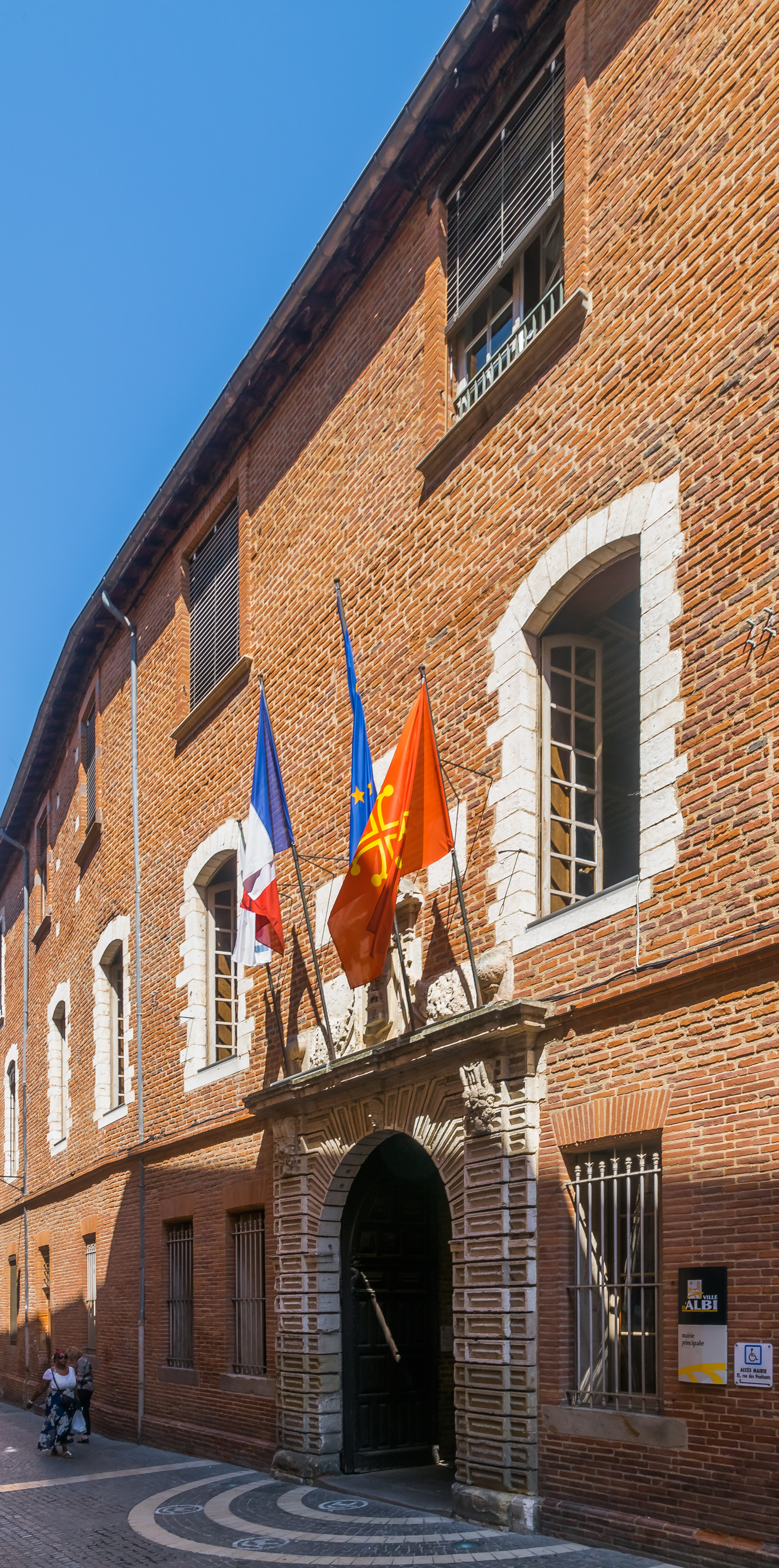
- The main frontage of the Hôtel de Ville in August 2017

General information
- Type: City hall
- Architectural style: Neoclassical style
- Location: Albi, France
- Coordinates: 43.9273°N 2.1464°E
- Completed: 1682

Monument historique
- Official name: Hôtel de ville
- Type: Inscrit
- Designated: 1971
- Reference no.: PA00095461

The Hôtel de Ville (French pronunciation: [otɛl də vil], City Hall) is a municipal building in Albi, Tarn, in southern France, standing on Rue de l'Hôtel de Ville. It was designated a monument historique by the French government in 1971.

== History ==
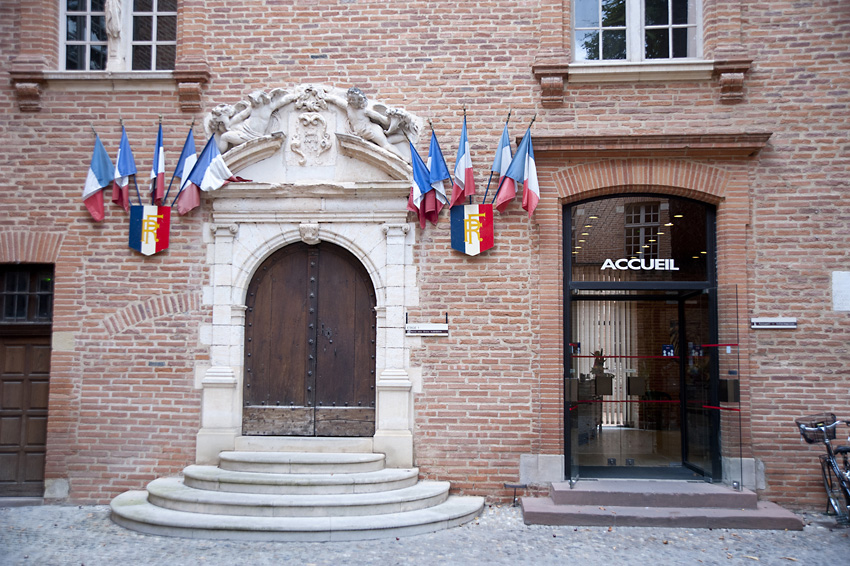
Inside the main courtyard

The first municipal building, known as the Maison Commune, was a rented building, in an old part of the town, dating back to the 14th century: the area was cleared for construction of the Halle du Marché Couvert (covered market) in the early 20th century. In 1391, the consuls purchased two houses in Rue de La Sabataria Sanct Jolia (now Rue Saint-Julien), one of which faced the Church of Saint-Salvi. They converted these buildings to create a town hall in 1397. Internally, the principal room was a great hall which was decorated with frescos by the local artist, Jean de Rabastens. It also had a fine ceiling which was decorated by another local artist, Marc Lor, in the late 15th century or early 16th century.

This arrangement continued for over three centuries until the consuls decided to acquire a more substantial building. The site they selected was the former house of the Treasurer of France for the Généralité of Toulouse, Étienne de Martin, on Carieira drecha del Viga (now Rue de l'Hôtel de Ville). Like most other buildings in the town, it was constructed in red brick. An inscription above one of the internal doorways indicated that the house dated back at least to 1682. However, either the current structure or an earlier version of it served as the home of Henri de Bourbon (1575–1647). Also known as the Marquis de Malauze and Seigneur de Lacaze, he was a Huguenot military commander in the late 16th century. The consuls completed the acquisition of the building in 1728.

The design involved a long asymmetrical main frontage facing onto Rue de l'Hôtel de Ville. It featured a tall round headed opening, in the eastern part of the frontage, which was flanked by pilasters decorated with bossages. Above the doorway, there was a cornice, and an entablature which bore the coat of arms of the town. The building was laid out as a typical hôtel particulier with a central courtyard. The opening on Rue de l'Hôtel de Ville led through to the courtyard, which faced east, and the main access to the building was through a stone doorway, sculpted in the Renaissance Revival style, inside the courtyard. Internally, the principal room was the Salle du Conseil (council chamber).
