= La Bastide-Solages =

Commune in Occitanie, France

La Bastide-Solages La Bastida de Solatge (Occitan)
- Commune
- Location of La Bastide-Solages
- Location within France Location within Occitanie
- Coordinates: 43°56′44″N 2°31′30″E
- Country: France
- Region: Occitania
- Department: Aveyron
- Arrondissement: Millau
- Canton: Causses-Rougiers
- Intercommunality: Réquistanais

Government
  - Mayor (2020–2026): André Rouquette
- Area^{1}: 7.1 km^{2} (2.7 sq mi)
- Elevation: 420 m (1,380 ft)
- Highest elevation: 570 m (1,870 ft)
- Lowest elevation: 205 m (673 ft)
- Population (2023): 117
  - Density: 16/km^{2} (43/sq mi)
- Time zone: UTC+01:00 (CET)
  - Summer (DST): UTC+02:00 (CEST)
- INSEE/Postal code: 12023 /12550
- ^{1} French Land Register data, which excludes lakes, ponds, glaciers > 1 km^{2} (0.386 sq mi or 247 acres) and river estuaries.

La Bastide-Solages (French pronunciation: [la bastid sɔlaʒ]; Occitan: La Bastida de Solatge or La Bastida Solatges) is a commune in the Aveyron department in the Occitanie region of Southern France. It is located on the departmental border with Tarn.

The inhabitants of the commune are known as Solageois (masculine) or Solageoises (feminine) in French.

== Geography ==
La Bastide-Solages is located some 25 km east by north-east of Albi and 28 km east by south-east of Carmaux just inside the Parc Naturel Regional des Grands Causses. The north-western and southern borders of the commune are the departmental border with Tarn. Access to the commune is by the D555 which branches from the D33 east of the commune and comes west through the village then north to rejoin the D33 north of the commune. The D665 branches from the D555 in the south of the commune and follows the southern border west to a bridge across the Tarn which links to the D172. Apart from the village there are the hamlets of La Carriere Basse, Cayssials, La Carriere Haute, La Bastide, and Le Bousquet. The commune is farmland in the middle with forests in the east and west.

The river Tarn forms the whole north-western border as it flows south-west to eventually join the Garonne at Boudou. The Rance river forms the southern border of the commune as it flows west to join the Tarn at the western tip of the commune.

== Toponymy ==
La Bastide-Solages appears as la Baftide Teulat on the 1750 Cassini Map and as la Baftide on the 1790 version.

== Administration ==
List of Successive Mayors

From	To	Name
1875	1885	Pierre Jean Pousthomis
1885	1896	Jean Souyris
1896	1903	Joseph Pousthomis
2001	2014	Léon Souyris
2014	2026	André Rouquette

== Demography ==
Between 1833 and 1874, La Bastide-Solages was part of the commune of Plaisance.

Historical population

Year	Pop.	±% p.a.
1793	255	—
1800	298	+2.25%
1876	466	+0.59%
1881	453	−0.56%
1886	424	−1.31%
1891	383	−2.01%
1896	429	+2.29%
1901	402	−1.29%
1906	405	+0.15%
1911	403	−0.10%
1921	309	−2.62%
1926	313	+0.26%
1931	250	−4.40%

Year	Pop.	±% p.a.
1936	270	+1.55%
1946	287	+0.61%
1954	249	−1.76%
1962	247	−0.10%
1968	212	−2.51%
1975	177	−2.54%
1982	130	−4.31%
1990	111	−1.96%
1999	97	−1.49%
2007	114	+2.04%
2012	112	−0.35%
2017	108	−0.72%
2023	117	+1.34%

Source: EHESS and INSEE

== Bibliography ==
- Christian-Pierre Bedel, Sent-Sarnin, Balaguièr, Brasc, Combret, Copiac, La Bastida-Solatges, La Sèrra, La Val-Ròca-Cesièira, Martrinh, Montclar, Montfranc, Plasença, Postòmis, Sant-Jòri / Christian-Pierre Bedel et les habitants del canton de Sent-Sarnin, Rodez, Mission départementale de la culture, 1992, Al canton collection, 232 pages, ill., cov. ill. 28 cm, ISBN 2-907279-10-6, ISSN 1151-8375, BnF 35529736f (in French)

== See also ==
- Communes of the Aveyron department
