= Tauriac-de-Camarès =

Commune in Occitanie, France

- Commune
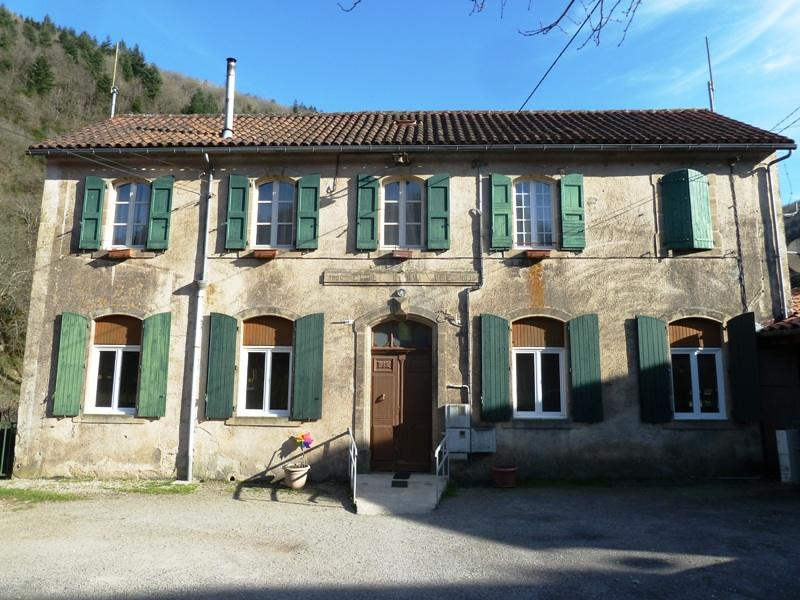
- Tauriac-de-Camarès Town hall

- Coat of arms
- Location of Tauriac-de-Camarès
- Location within France Location within Occitanie
- Coordinates: 43°46′51″N 3°01′51″E
- Country: France
- Region: Occitania
- Department: Aveyron
- Arrondissement: Millau
- Canton: Causses-Rougiers

Government
  - Mayor (2020–2026): Jean-Marc Nègre
- Area^{1}: 24.75 km^{2} (9.56 sq mi)
- Elevation: 510 m (1,670 ft)
- Highest elevation: 905 m (2,969 ft)
- Lowest elevation: 467 m (1,532 ft)
- Population (2023): 35
  - Density: 1.4/km^{2} (3.7/sq mi)
- Time zone: UTC+01:00 (CET)
  - Summer (DST): UTC+02:00 (CEST)
- INSEE/Postal code: 12275 /12360
- ^{1} French Land Register data, which excludes lakes, ponds, glaciers > 1 km^{2} (0.386 sq mi or 247 acres) and river estuaries.

Tauriac-de-Camarès (French pronunciation: [toʁjak də kamaʁɛs], literally Tauriac of Camarès; Occitan: Tauriac de Camarés) is a commune in the Aveyron department in the Occitanie region in southern France.

== Population ==
Historical population
Year	Pop.	±% p.a.
1968	99	—
1975	82	−2.66%
1982	73	−1.65%
1990	56	−3.26%
1999	64	+1.49%
2007	59	−1.01%
2012	53	−2.12%
2017	41	−5.00%
2023	35	−2.60%
Source: INSEE

== See also ==
- Communes of the Aveyron department
