= Moustiers =

Moustier or Moustiers is the name or part of the name of several communes in France and Belgium:

Belgium

- Moustier, Hainaut, in Hainaut province
- Moustier-sur-Sambre, in Namur province

France

- Moustier, Lot-et-Garonne, in the Lot-et-Garonne département
- Moustier-en-Fagne, in the Nord département
- Moustier-Ventadour, in the Corrèze département
- Peyzac-le-Moustier, in the Dordogne département
- Saint-Sever-du-Moustier, in the Aveyron département
- Moustiers-Sainte-Marie, also called Moustiers, in the Alpes-de-Haute-Provence département
- Verneuil-Moustiers, in the Haute-Vienne département
