= Arnac-sur-Dourdou =

Commune in Occitanie, France

- Commune
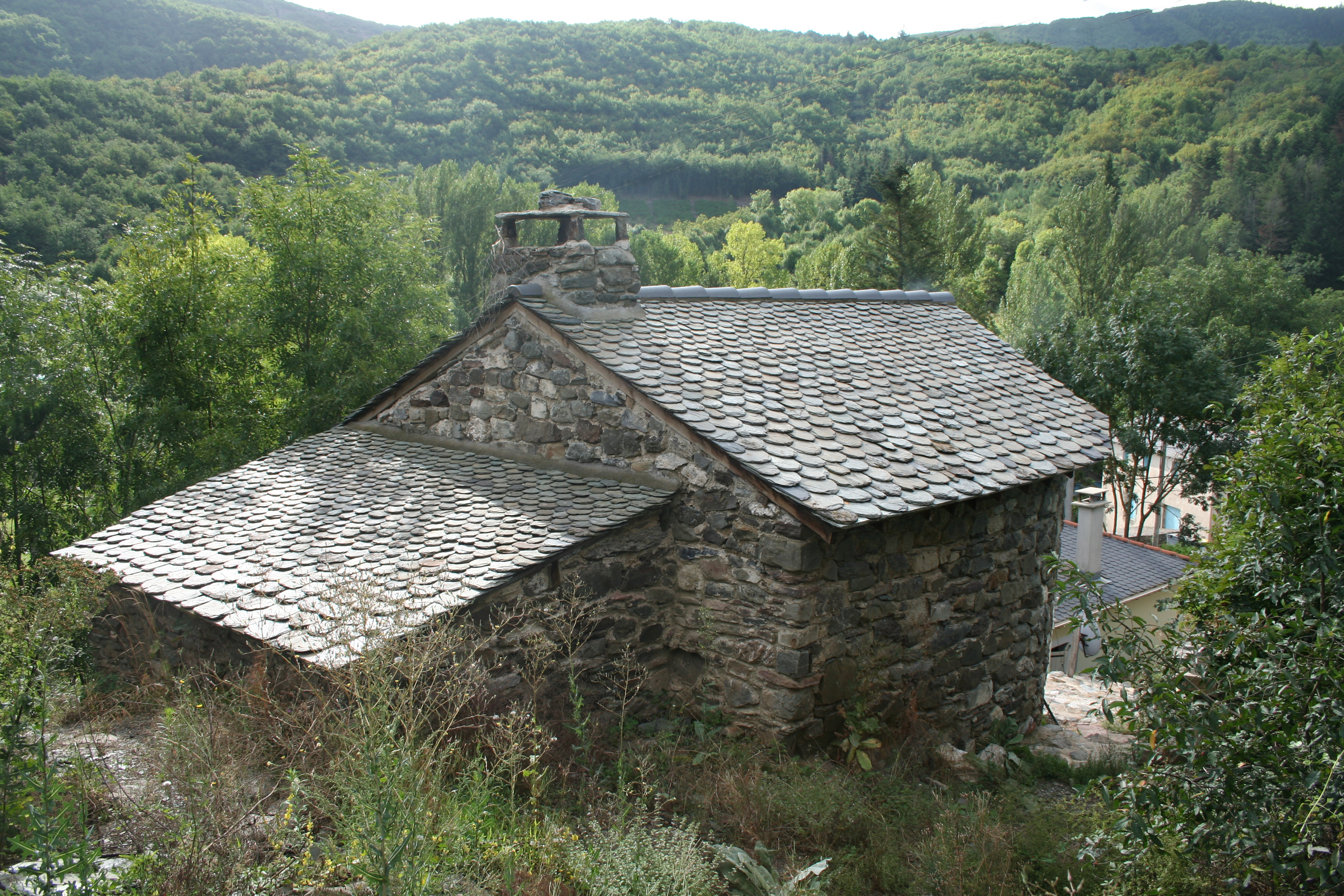
- Old bread oven
- Location of Arnac-sur-Dourdou
- Location within France Location within Occitanie
- Coordinates: 43°43′38″N 2°56′00″E
- Country: France
- Region: Occitania
- Department: Aveyron
- Arrondissement: Millau
- Canton: Causses-Rougiers
- Intercommunality: Monts, Rance et Rougier

Government
  - Mayor (2020–2026): Guy Sales
- Area^{1}: 16.57 km^{2} (6.40 sq mi)
- Elevation: 560 m (1,840 ft)
- Highest elevation: 1,000 m (3,300 ft)
- Lowest elevation: 506 m (1,660 ft)
- Population (2023): 47
  - Density: 2.8/km^{2} (7.3/sq mi)
- Time zone: UTC+01:00 (CET)
  - Summer (DST): UTC+02:00 (CEST)
- INSEE/Postal code: 12009 /12360
- ^{1} French Land Register data, which excludes lakes, ponds, glaciers > 1 km^{2} (0.386 sq mi or 247 acres) and river estuaries.

Arnac-sur-Dourdou (French pronunciation: [aʁnak syʁ duʁdu], literally Arnac on Dourdou; Occitan: Arnac) is a commune in the Aveyron department in the Occitanie region of southern France.

== Geography ==
Arnac-sur-Dourdou is a sparsely populated commune in the extreme southern corner of Aveyron some 50 km west by north-west of Saint-André-de-Sangonis and 8 km east by north-east of Murat-sur-Vèbre in the heart of the Lacaune mountains. The western border of the commune is also the border between the departments of Aveyron and Tarn while the southern border is the border between Aveyron and Hérault. Access to the commune is by the D92 road from Brusque in the north which is a tortuous mountain road going to the village and continuing west to change to the D162 at the commune border then south to join the D622 to Murat-sur-Vèbre. The D12 road from Brusque to the south forms the eastern border of the commune and road D174 connects the village to this road. The commune is mountainous and heavily forested.

The Dourdou de Camarès river flows through the commune and the village from east to west gathering numerous tributaries flowing from all corners of the commune.

== History ==
Until the French Revolution the Parish of Arnac was part of the community of Brusque. Saint-Benoît-d'Arnac was then an annex of the Parish of Saint-Pierre-des-Cats (currently the commune of Mélagues). After the Revolution Arnac was part of the commune of Mélagues. It was in 1872 that the commune of Arnac-sur-Dourdou was founded. Today the village consists of many second homes which are often the properties of descendants of the past inhabitants of the village.

== Administration ==
List of Successive Mayors

From	To	Name	Party
1872	1892	Barthélémy Garenq	
1892	1929	Jacques Roques	
1929	1935	Hyppolyte Garenq	
1935	1945	Jacques Roques	
1945	1947	Jean Bertrand	
1947	1995	Louis Maury	
1995	1997	Pierre Garrencq	
1997	2008	Henri Riac	
2008	2020	Fernande Singer	DVG
2020	2026	Guy Sales	

== Population ==
The inhabitants of the commune are known as Arnacois or Arnacoises in French.

Historical population
Year	Pop.	±% p.a.
1968	87	—
1975	66	−3.87%
1982	48	−4.45%
1990	55	+1.72%
1999	30	−6.51%
2007	23	−3.27%
2012	37	+9.98%
2017	34	−1.68%
2023	47	+5.54%
Source: INSEE

== Cultural Events and Festivals ==
- Arnac Festival in traditional clothes
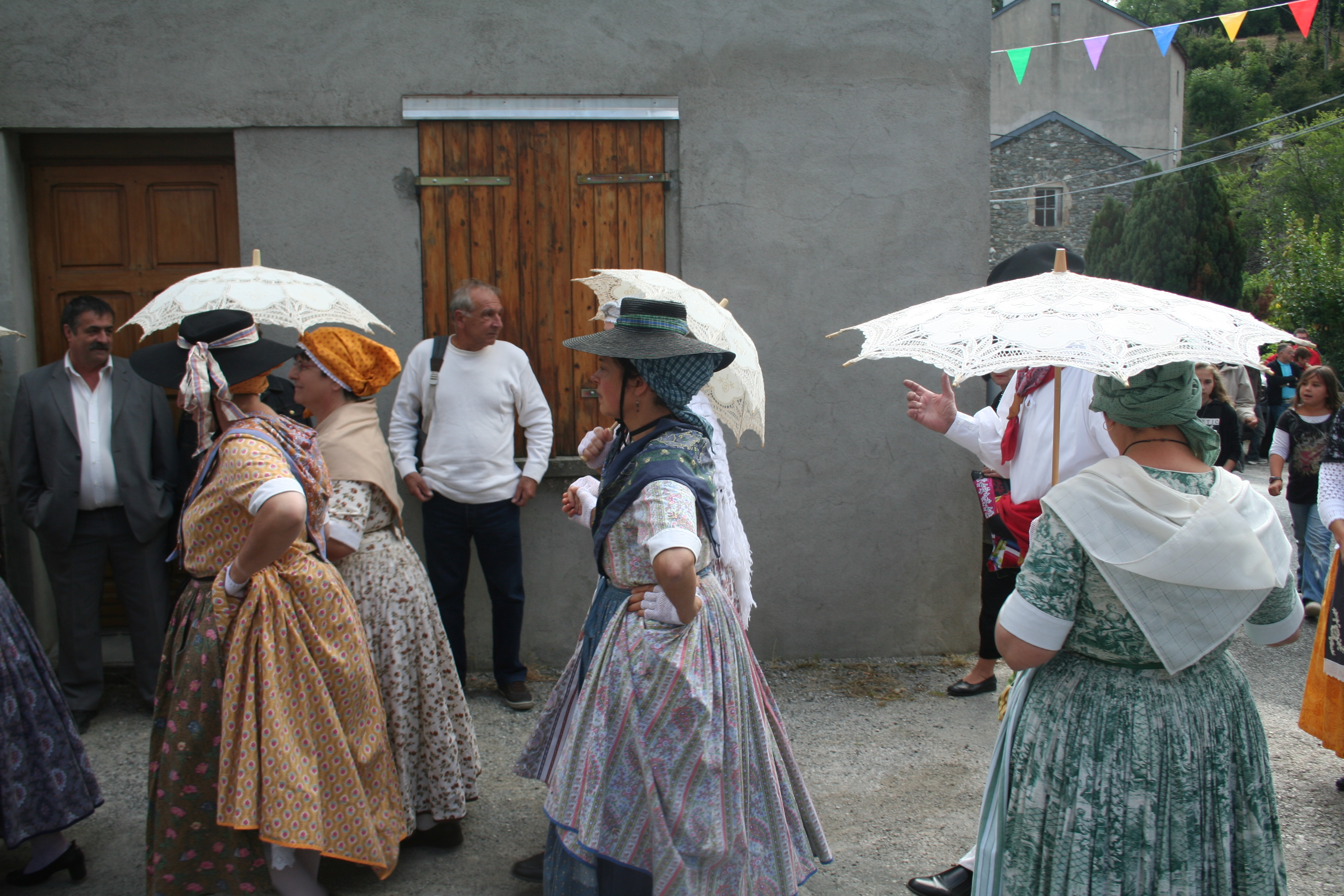

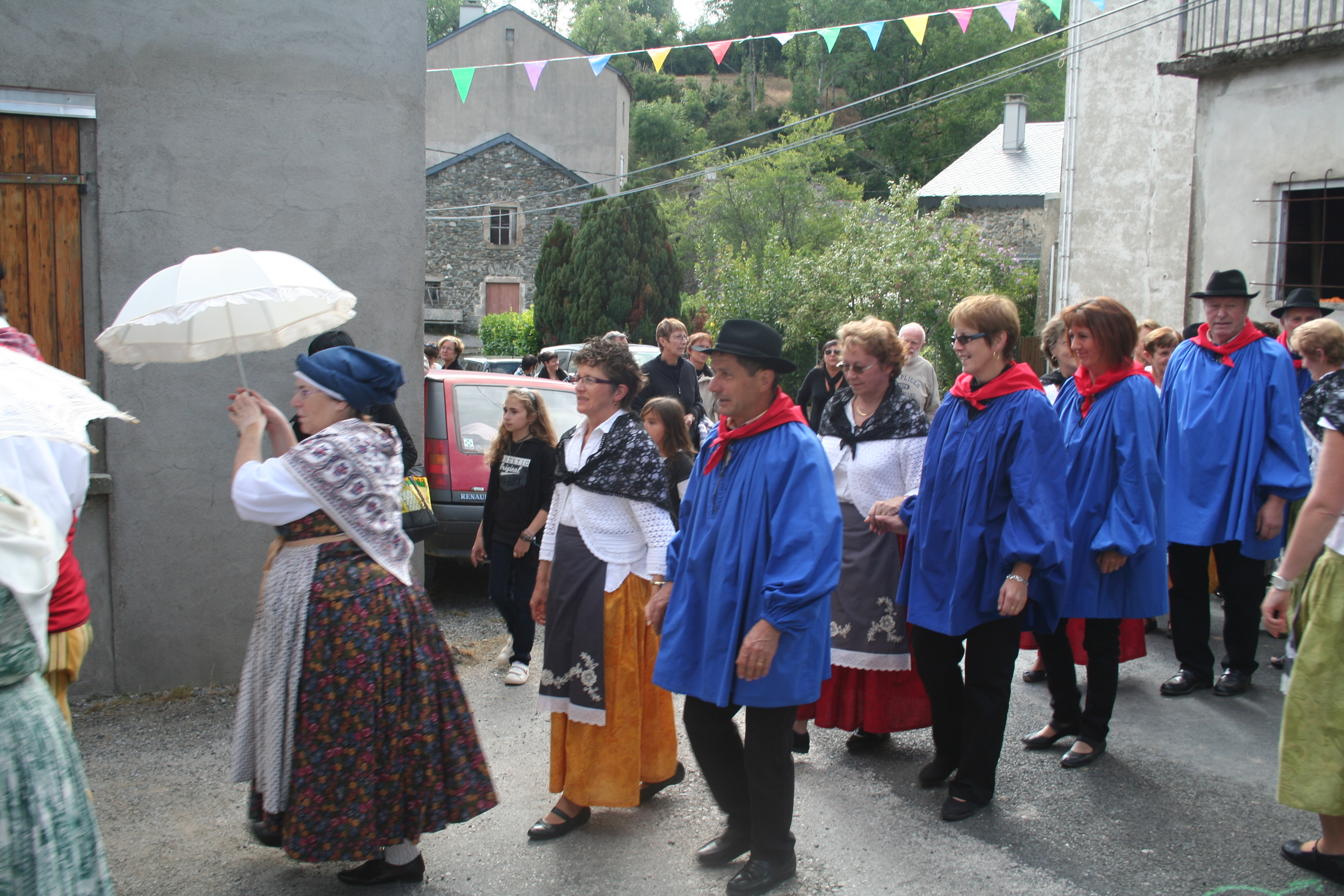

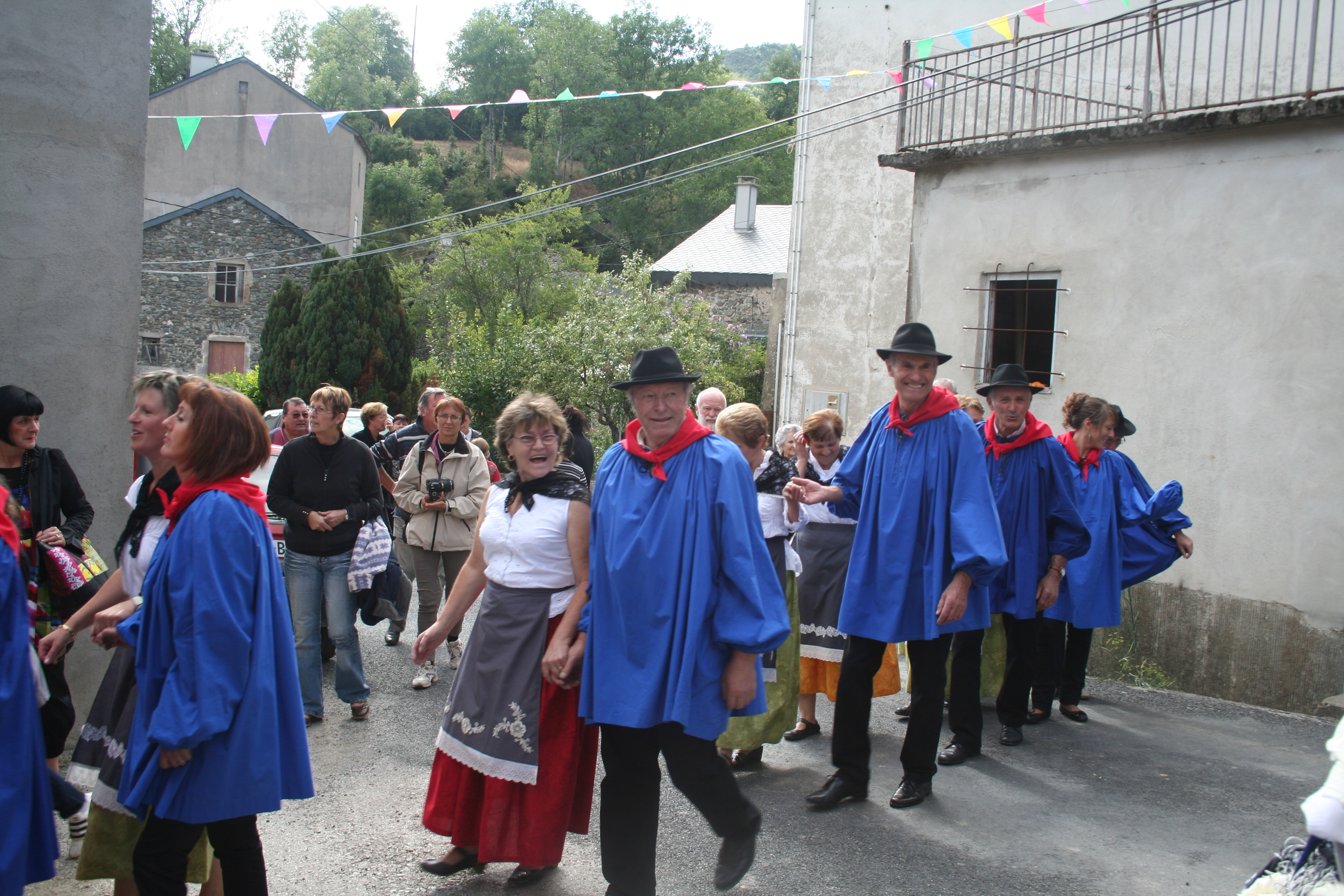

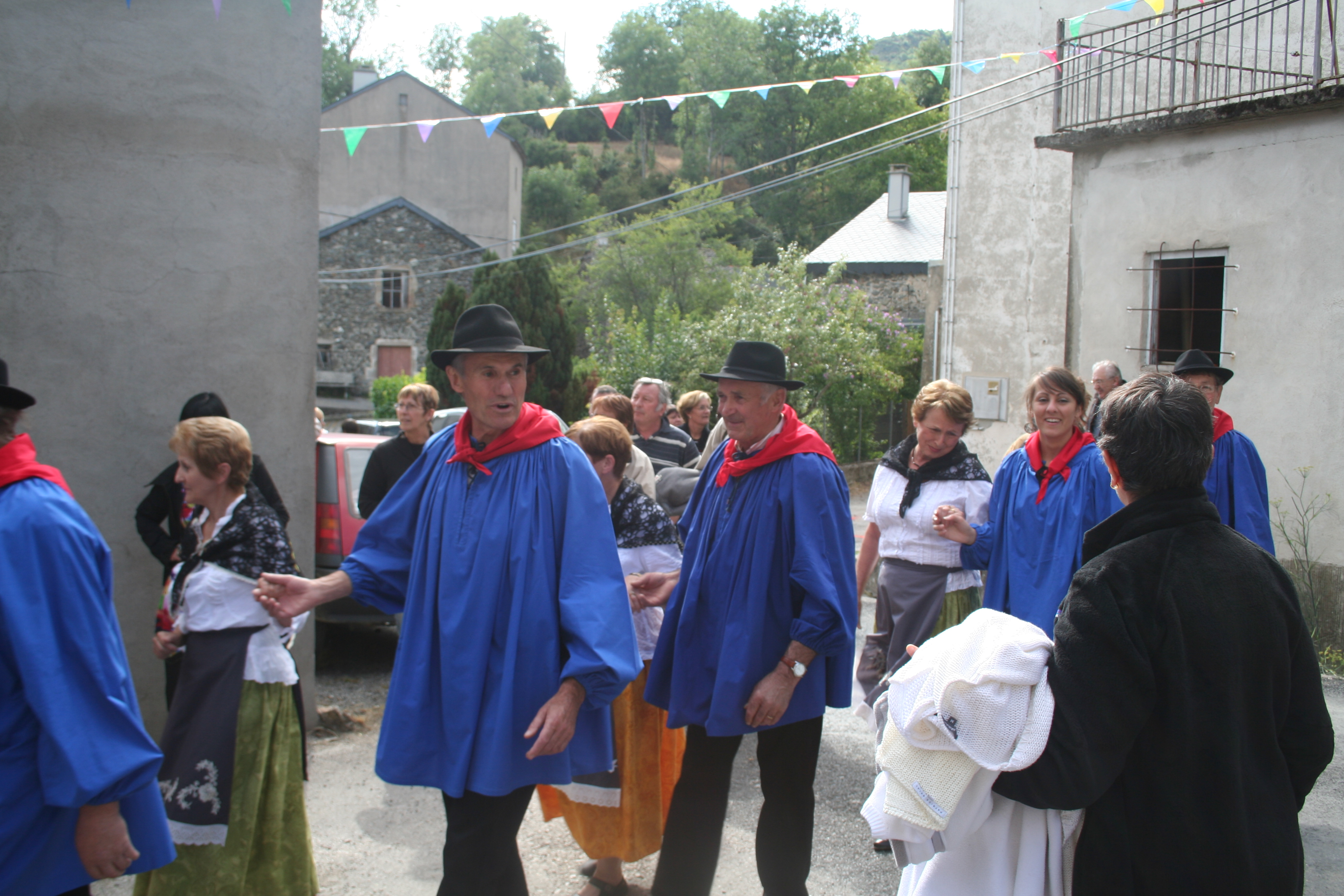

== Sites and monuments ==
- The Church of Saint-Benoît
- The Bread oven at the Arnac Mill
- The GR 71 passes through the commune
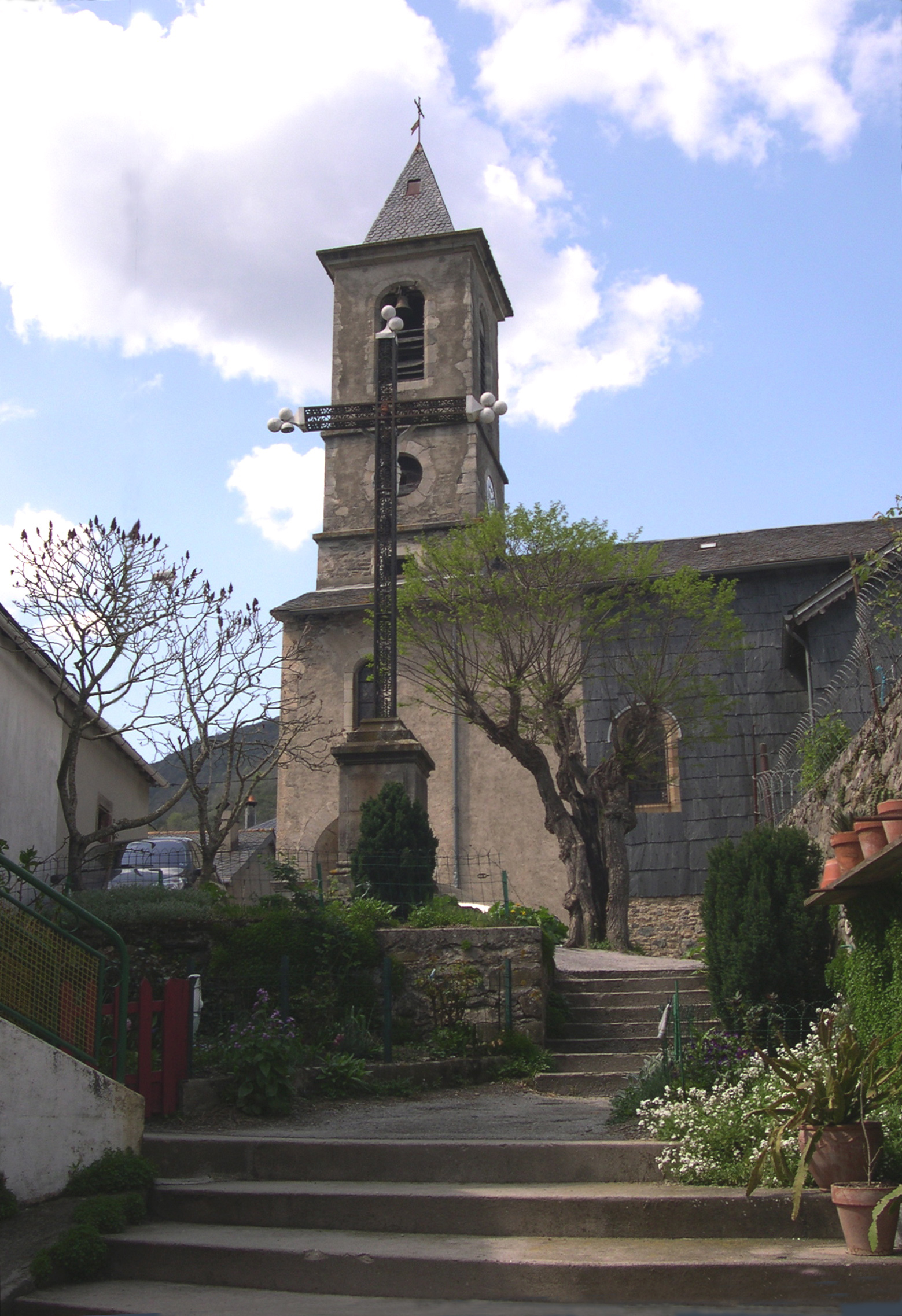
Church of Saint-Benoît.

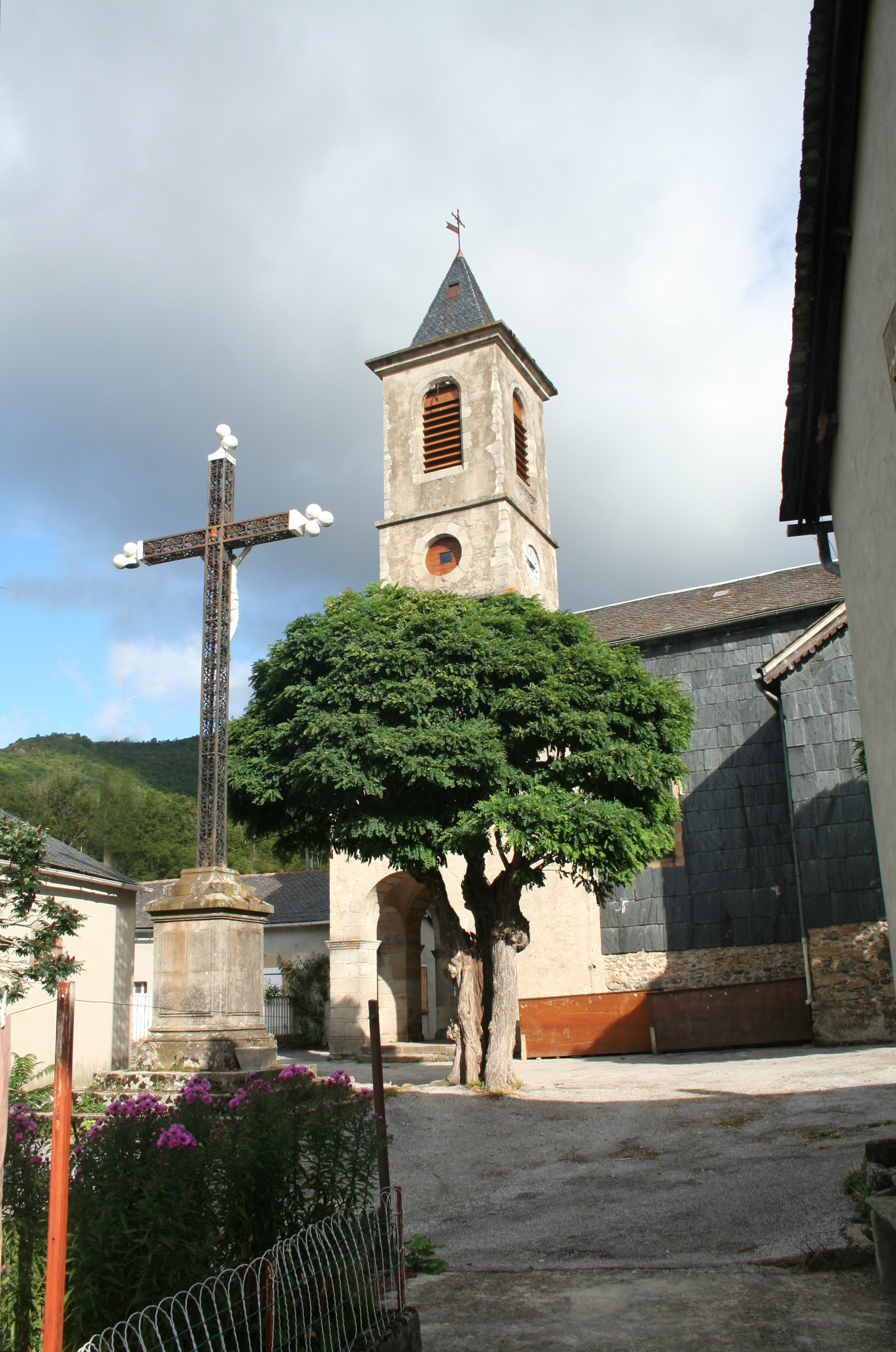
Church of Saint-Benoît.

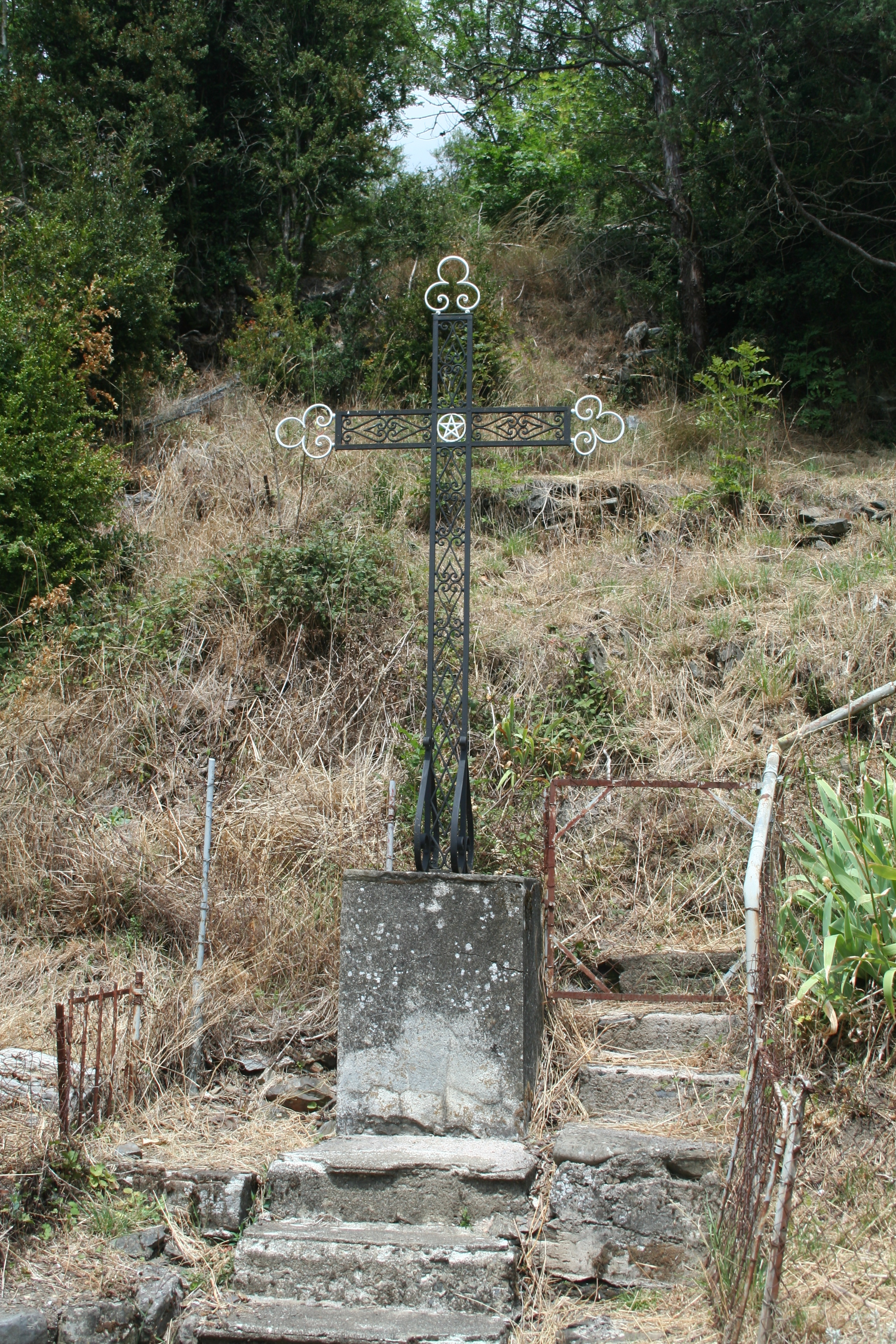
Wayside Cross.

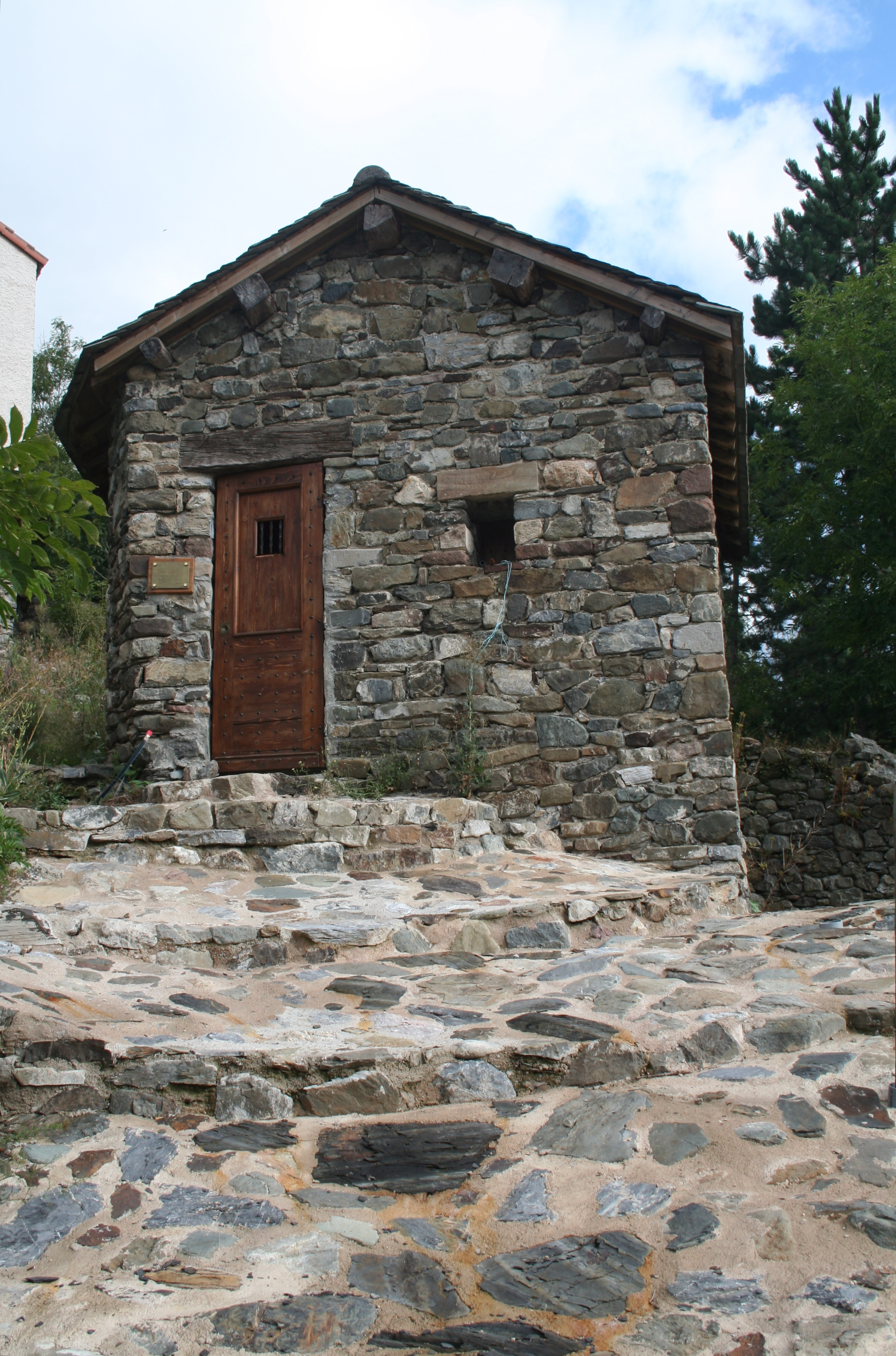
The bread oven in the Mill of Arnac.

== See also ==
- Communes of the Aveyron department

=== Bibliography ===
- Christian-Pierre Bedel, Lo Pont - Arnac, Brusca, Faiet, Gissac, Melagas, Montanhòl, Pèus-e-Cofolèus, Silvanés, Tauriac, preface by the General Counsel, Christian-Pierre Bedel e los estatjants del canton de Camarés, Rodez, Mission départementale de la culture, 2000, Al canton collection, 320 pages, ill., cover ill., 28 cm, ISBN 2-907279-50-5, ISSN 1151-8375, BNF 37657611d (Occitan/French)
