= Saint-Beaulize =

Commune in Occitanie, France

- Commune
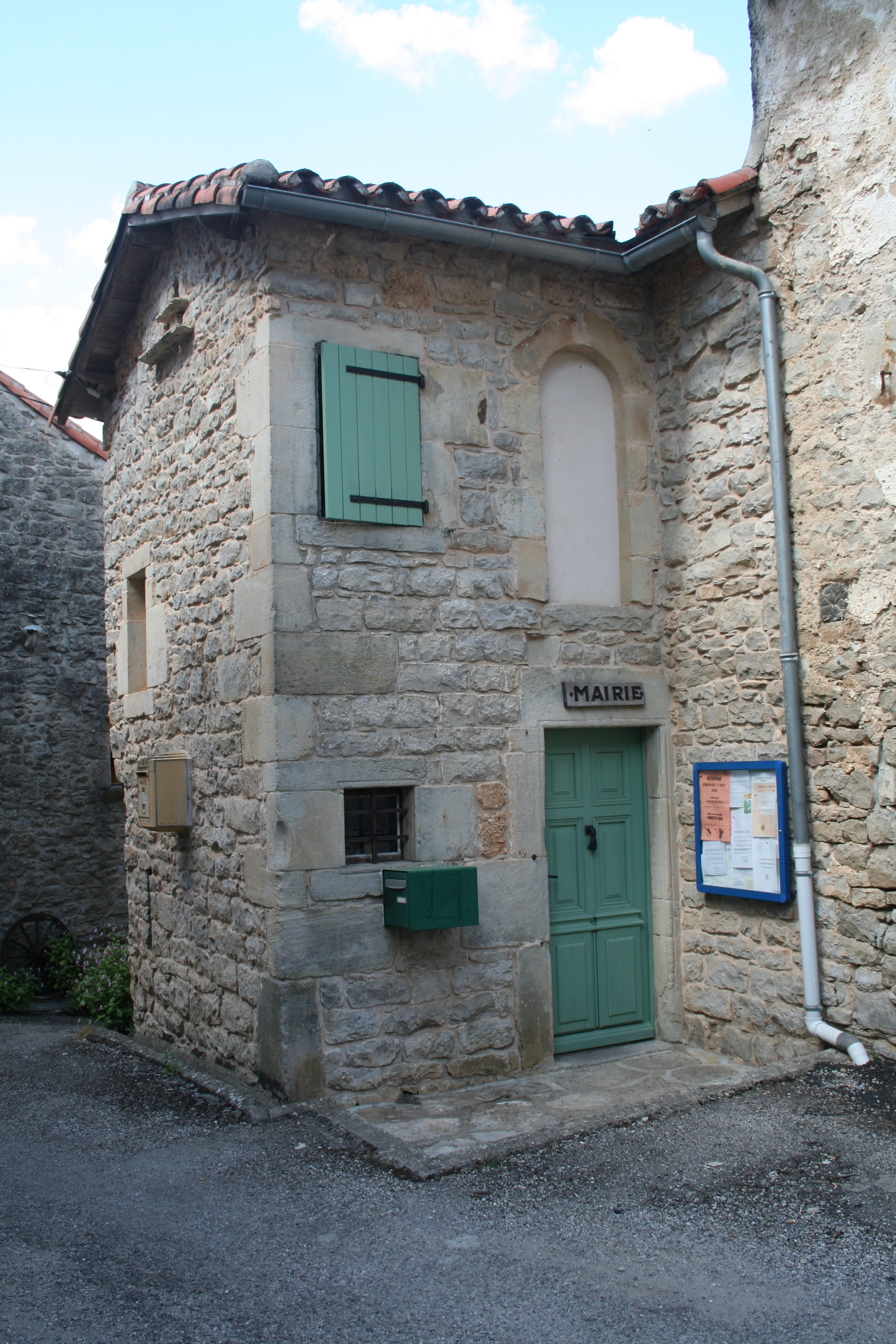
- Town hall
- Location of Saint-Beaulize
- Location within France Location within Occitanie
- Coordinates: 43°53′53″N 3°06′37″E
- Country: France
- Region: Occitania
- Department: Aveyron
- Arrondissement: Millau
- Canton: Causses-Rougiers

Government
  - Mayor (2020–2026): Guy Cazottes
- Area^{1}: 19.97 km^{2} (7.71 sq mi)
- Elevation: 530 m (1,740 ft)
- Highest elevation: 849 m (2,785 ft)
- Lowest elevation: 500 m (1,600 ft)
- Population (2023): 107
  - Density: 5.36/km^{2} (13.9/sq mi)
- Time zone: UTC+01:00 (CET)
  - Summer (DST): UTC+02:00 (CEST)
- INSEE/Postal code: 12212 /12540
- ^{1} French Land Register data, which excludes lakes, ponds, glaciers > 1 km^{2} (0.386 sq mi or 247 acres) and river estuaries.

Saint-Beaulize (French pronunciation: [sɛ̃ boliz]; Occitan: Sent Baulise) is a commune in the Aveyron department in southern France. The nearest airport is Larzac, which is 7 miles (11.3 km) away.

== Population ==
Historical population
| Year | Pop. | ±% p.a. |
|---|---|---|
| 1968 | 93 | — |
| 1975 | 104 | +1.61% |
| 1982 | 93 | −1.58% |
| 1990 | 86 | −0.97% |
| 1999 | 95 | +1.11% |
| 2007 | 98 | +0.39% |
| 2012 | 109 | +2.15% |
| 2017 | 89 | −3.97% |
| 2023 | 107 | +3.12% |
Source: INSEE

== See also ==
- Communes of the Aveyron department
