= Montagnol =

Commune in Occitanie, France

- Commune
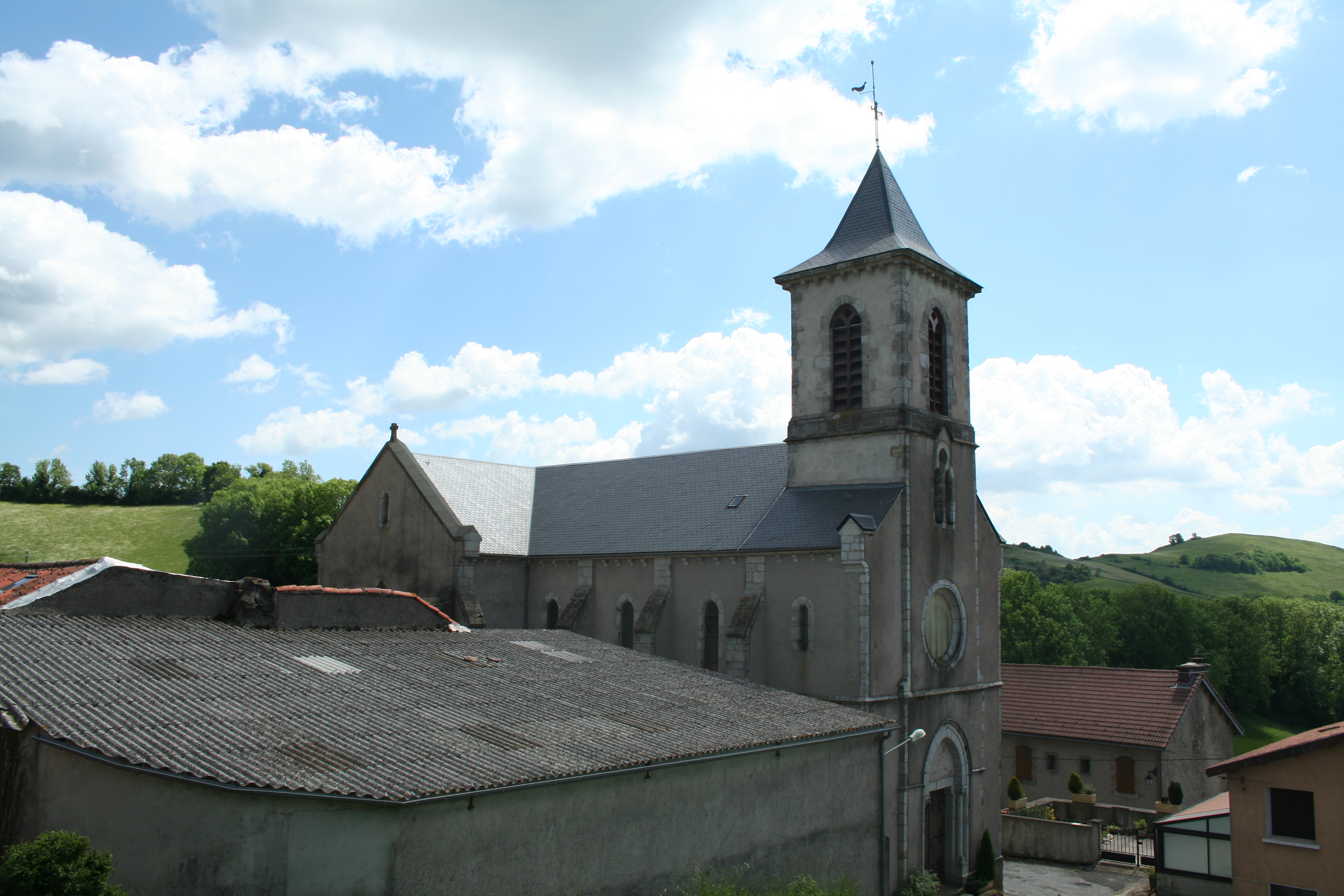
- The church in Montagnol
- Location of Montagnol
- Location within France Location within Occitanie
- Coordinates: 43°50′21″N 3°00′50″E
- Country: France
- Region: Occitania
- Department: Aveyron
- Arrondissement: Millau
- Canton: Causses-Rougiers

Government
  - Mayor (2020–2026): Claude Chibaudel
- Area^{1}: 34.47 km^{2} (13.31 sq mi)
- Elevation: 630 m (2,070 ft)
- Highest elevation: 826 m (2,710 ft)
- Lowest elevation: 450 m (1,480 ft)
- Population (2023): 149
  - Density: 4.32/km^{2} (11.2/sq mi)
- Time zone: UTC+01:00 (CET)
  - Summer (DST): UTC+02:00 (CEST)
- INSEE/Postal code: 12147 /12360
- ^{1} French Land Register data, which excludes lakes, ponds, glaciers > 1 km^{2} (0.386 sq mi or 247 acres) and river estuaries.

Montagnol (French pronunciation: [mɔ̃taɲɔl]; Occitan: Montanhòl) is a commune in the Aveyron department in southern France.

== Population ==
Historical population
Year	Pop.	±% p.a.
1968	241	—
1975	207	−2.15%
1982	191	−1.14%
1990	172	−1.30%
1999	159	−0.87%
2007	156	−0.24%
2012	139	−2.28%
2017	133	−0.88%
2023	149	+1.91%
Source: INSEE

== See also ==
- Communes of the Aveyron department
