= Pousthomy =

Commune in Occitanie, France

- Commune
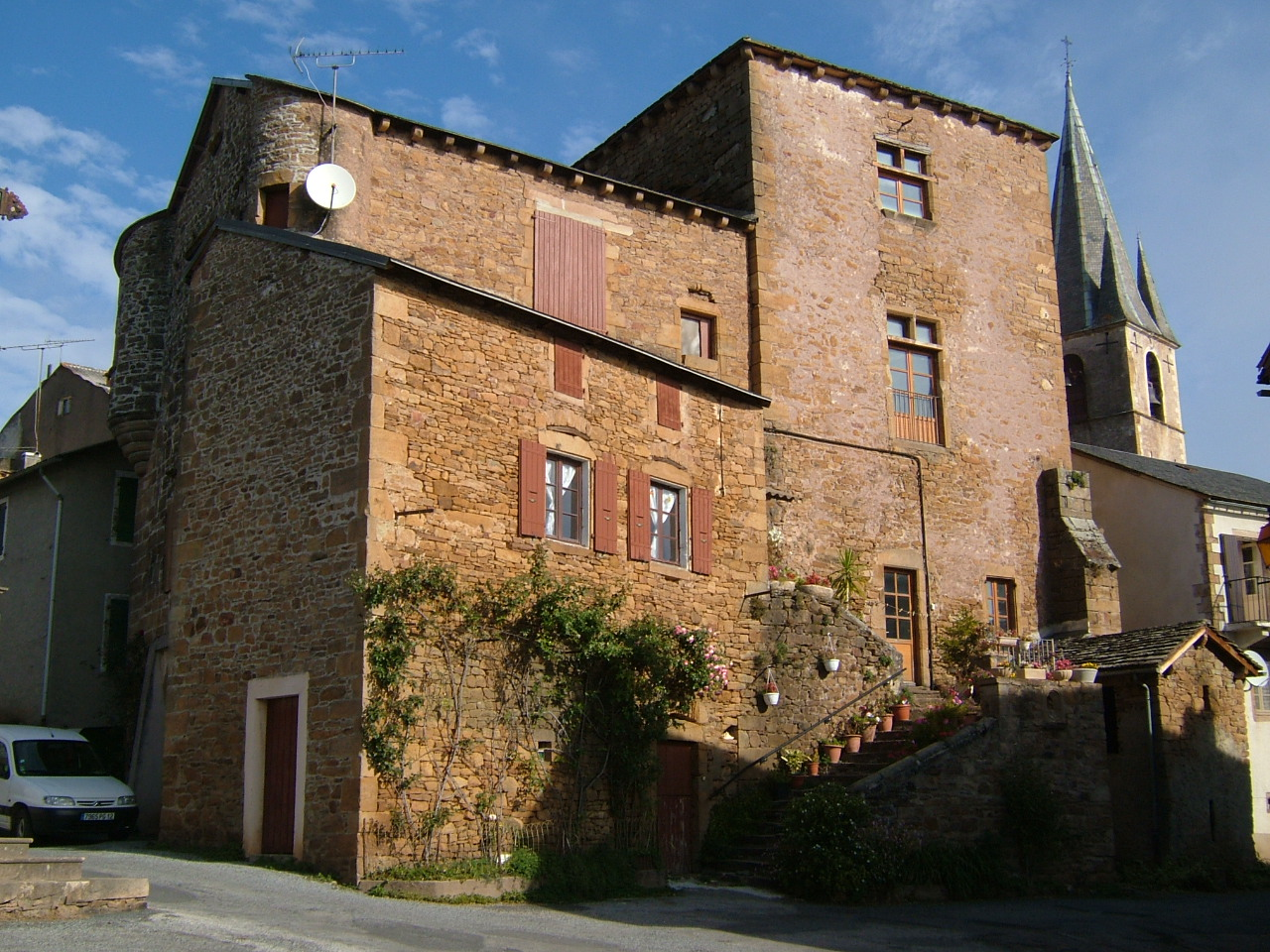
- Houses in Pousthomy
- Location of Pousthomy
- Location within France Location within Occitanie
- Coordinates: 43°51′32″N 2°36′49″E
- Country: France
- Region: Occitania
- Department: Aveyron
- Arrondissement: Millau
- Canton: Causses-Rougiers

Government
  - Mayor (2020–2026): Jacqueline Lavabre
- Area^{1}: 17.33 km^{2} (6.69 sq mi)
- Elevation: 480 m (1,570 ft)
- Highest elevation: 807 m (2,648 ft)
- Lowest elevation: 308 m (1,010 ft)
- Population (2023): 212
  - Density: 12.2/km^{2} (31.7/sq mi)
- Time zone: UTC+01:00 (CET)
  - Summer (DST): UTC+02:00 (CEST)
- INSEE/Postal code: 12186 /12380
- ^{1} French Land Register data, which excludes lakes, ponds, glaciers > 1 km^{2} (0.386 sq mi or 247 acres) and river estuaries.

Pousthomy (French pronunciation: [pustɔmi]; Occitan: Postòmis) is a commune in the Aveyron department in southern France.

== Population ==
Historical population
Year	Pop.	±% p.a.
1968	389	—
1975	282	−4.49%
1982	242	−2.16%
1990	199	−2.42%
1999	186	−0.75%
2007	212	+1.65%
2012	211	−0.09%
2017	211	+0.00%
2023	212	+0.08%
Source: INSEE

== See also ==
- Communes of the Aveyron department
