= Arrondissement of Millau =

Coordinates: 44.10°N 3.08°E

Millau
- Arrondissement
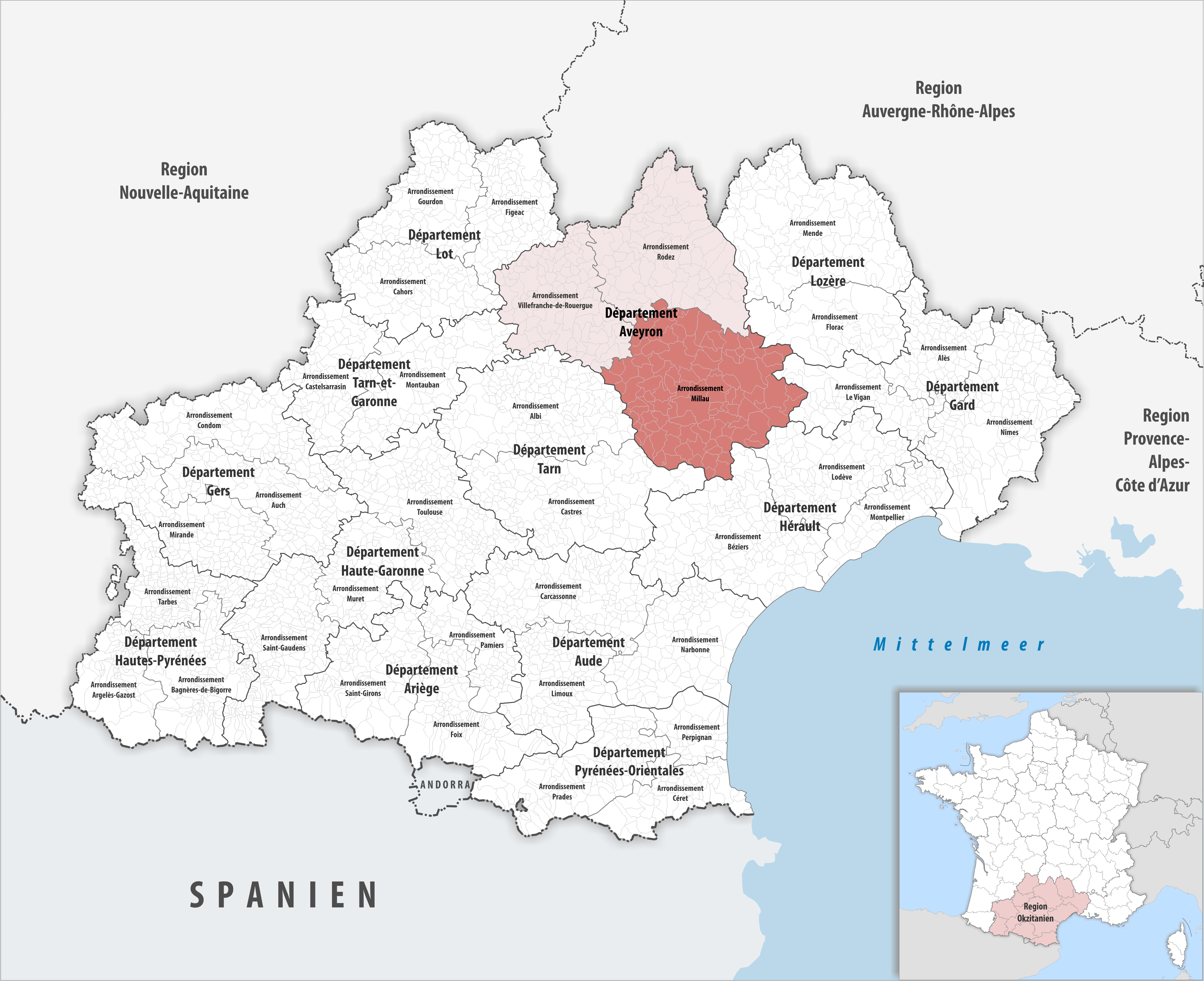
- Location within the region Occitanie
- Country: France
- Region: Occitania
- Department: Aveyron
- No. of communes: {{{nbcomm}}}
- Area: 3,741.7 km^{2} (1,444.7 sq mi)
- Population (2023): 79,819
  - Density: 21.332/km^{2} (55.250/sq mi)
- INSEE code: 121

The arrondissement of Millau is an arrondissement of France in the Aveyron department in the Occitanie region. It has 110 communes. Its population is 79,528 (2021), and its area is 3,741.7 km^{2} (1,444.7 sq mi).

== Composition ==
The communes of the arrondissement of Millau, and their INSEE codes, are:

1. Agen-d'Aveyron (12001)
2. Aguessac (12002)
3. Alrance (12006)
4. Arnac-sur-Dourdou (12009)
5. Arques (12010)
6. Arvieu (12011)
7. Auriac-Lagast (12015)
8. Ayssènes (12017)
9. Balaguier-sur-Rance (12019)
10. La Bastide-Pradines (12022)
11. La Bastide-Solages (12023)
12. Belmont-sur-Rance (12025)
13. Brasc (12035)
14. Broquiès (12037)
15. Brousse-le-Château (12038)
16. Brusque (12039)
17. Calmels-et-le-Viala (12042)
18. Camarès (12044)
19. Canet-de-Salars (12050)
20. Castelnau-Pégayrols (12062)
21. La Cavalerie (12063)
22. Le Clapier (12067)
23. Combret (12069)
24. Compeyre (12070)
25. Comprégnac (12072)
26. Comps-la-Grand-Ville (12073)
27. Connac (12075)
28. Cornus (12077)
29. Les Costes-Gozon (12078)
30. Coupiac (12080)
31. La Couvertoirade (12082)
32. Creissels (12084)
33. La Cresse (12086)
34. Curan (12307)
35. Durenque (12092)
36. Fayet (12099)
37. Flavin (12102)
38. Fondamente (12155)
39. Gissac (12109)
40. L'Hospitalet-du-Larzac (12115)
41. Lapanouse-de-Cernon (12122)
42. Laval-Roquecezière (12125)
43. Lédergues (12127)
44. Lestrade-et-Thouels (12129)
45. Marnhagues-et-Latour (12139)
46. Martrin (12141)
47. Mélagues (12143)
48. Millau (12145)
49. Montagnol (12147)
50. Montclar (12149)
51. Montfranc (12152)
52. Montjaux (12153)
53. Montlaur (12154)
54. Mostuéjouls (12160)
55. Mounes-Prohencoux (12192)
56. Murasson (12163)
57. Nant (12168)
58. Paulhe (12178)
59. Peux-et-Couffouleux (12179)
60. Peyreleau (12180)
61. Plaisance (12183)
62. Pont-de-Salars (12185)
63. Pousthomy (12186)
64. Prades-Salars (12188)
65. Rebourguil (12195)
66. Réquista (12197)
67. Rivière-sur-Tarn (12200)
68. Roquefort-sur-Soulzon (12203)
69. La Roque-Sainte-Marguerite (12204)
70. Rullac-Saint-Cirq (12207)
71. Saint-Affrique (12208)
72. Saint-André-de-Vézines (12211)
73. Saint-Beaulize (12212)
74. Saint-Beauzély (12213)
75. Sainte-Eulalie-de-Cernon (12220)
76. Saint-Félix-de-Sorgues (12222)
77. Saint-Georges-de-Luzençon (12225)
78. Saint-Izaire (12228)
79. Saint-Jean-d'Alcapiès (12229)
80. Saint-Jean-Delnous (12230)
81. Saint-Jean-du-Bruel (12231)
82. Saint-Jean-et-Saint-Paul (12232)
83. Saint-Juéry (12233)
84. Saint-Laurent-de-Lévézou (12236)
85. Saint-Léons (12238)
86. Saint-Rome-de-Cernon (12243)
87. Saint-Rome-de-Tarn (12244)
88. Saint-Sernin-sur-Rance (12248)
89. Saint-Sever-du-Moustier (12249)
90. Saint-Victor-et-Melvieu (12251)
91. Salles-Curan (12253)
92. Salmiech (12255)
93. Sauclières (12260)
94. Ségur (12266)
95. La Selve (12267)
96. La Serre (12269)
97. Sylvanès (12274)
98. Tauriac-de-Camarès (12275)
99. Tournemire (12282)
100. Trémouilles (12283)
101. Le Truel (12284)
102. Vabres-l'Abbaye (12286)
103. Verrières (12291)
104. Versols-et-Lapeyre (12292)
105. Veyreau (12293)
106. Vézins-de-Lévézou (12294)
107. Viala-du-Pas-de-Jaux (12295)
108. Viala-du-Tarn (12296)
109. Le Vibal (12297)
110. Villefranche-de-Panat (12299)

== History ==
The arrondissement of Millau was created in 1800. At the January 2017 reorganization of the arrondissements of Aveyron, it lost six communes to the arrondissement of Rodez, and it gained 19 communes from the arrondissement of Rodez.

As a result of the reorganisation of the cantons of France which came into effect in 2015, the borders of the cantons are no longer related to the borders of the arrondissements. The cantons of the arrondissement of Millau were, as of January 2015:

1. Belmont-sur-Rance
2. Camarès
3. Campagnac
4. Cornus
5. Millau-Est
6. Millau-Ouest
7. Nant
8. Peyreleau
9. Saint-Affrique
10. Saint-Beauzély
11. Saint-Rome-de-Tarn
12. Saint-Sernin-sur-Rance
13. Salles-Curan
14. Sévérac-le-Château
15. Vézins-de-Lévézou
