= Viala-du-Pas-de-Jaux =

Commune in Occitanie, France

- Commune
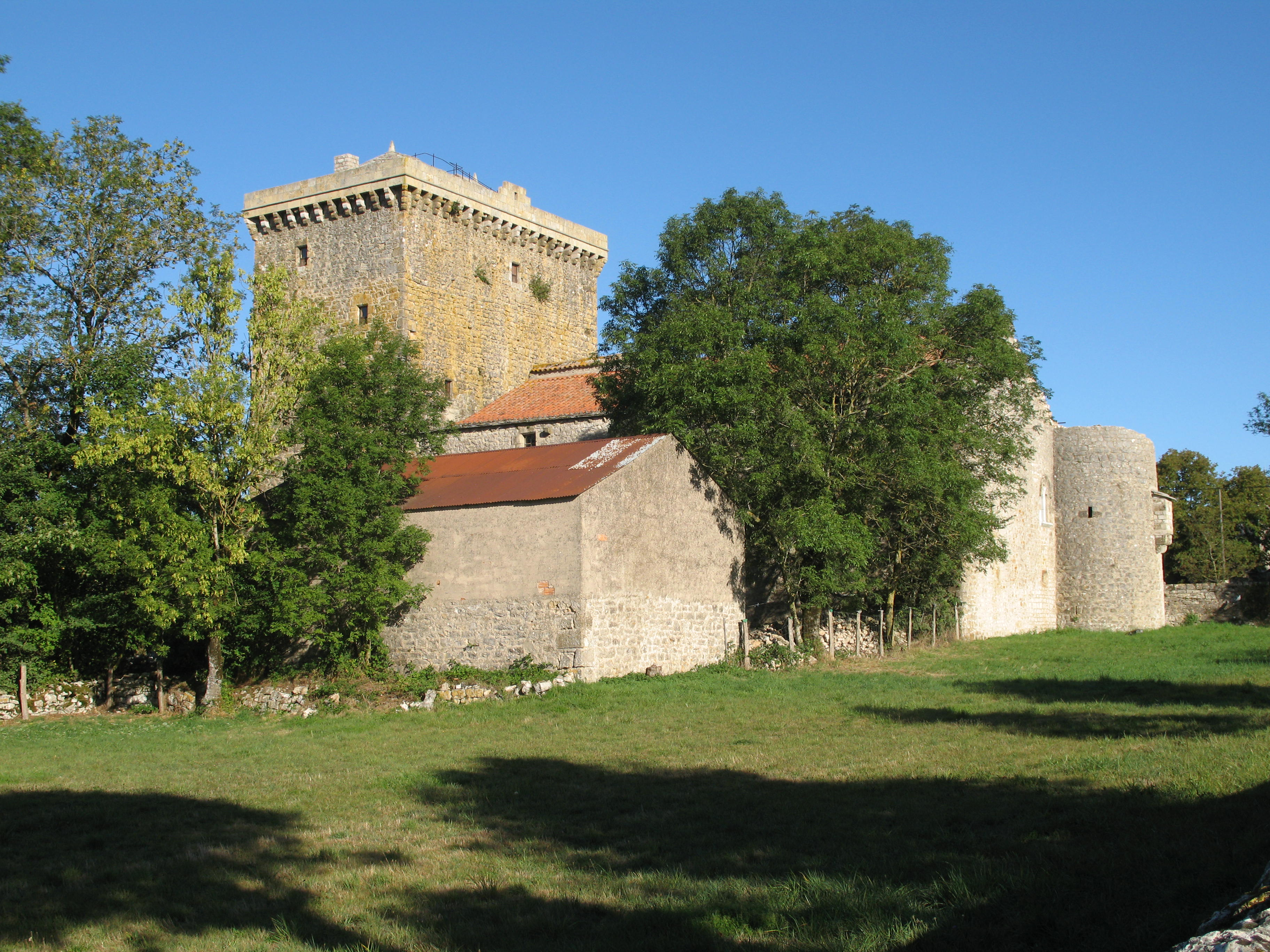
- The tower in Viala-du-Pas-de-Jaux
- Location of Viala-du-Pas-de-Jaux
- Location within France Location within Occitanie
- Coordinates: 43°57′27″N 3°03′23″E
- Country: France
- Region: Occitania
- Department: Aveyron
- Arrondissement: Millau
- Canton: Causses-Rougiers
- Intercommunality: Larzac et Vallées

Government
  - Mayor (2020–2026): Lucien Moulieres
- Area^{1}: 18.95 km^{2} (7.32 sq mi)
- Elevation: 810 m (2,660 ft)
- Highest elevation: 879 m (2,884 ft)
- Lowest elevation: 720 m (2,360 ft)
- Population (2023): 84
  - Density: 4.4/km^{2} (11/sq mi)
- Time zone: UTC+01:00 (CET)
  - Summer (DST): UTC+02:00 (CEST)
- INSEE/Postal code: 12295 /12250
- ^{1} French Land Register data, which excludes lakes, ponds, glaciers > 1 km^{2} (0.386 sq mi or 247 acres) and river estuaries.

Viala-du-Pas-de-Jaux (French pronunciation: [vjala dy pa də ʒo]; Occitan: Lo Vialar del Pas de Jòus) is a commune in the Aveyron department in the Occitanie region in southern France.

== Population ==
Historical population
Year	Pop.	±% p.a.
1968	100	—
1975	80	−3.14%
1982	87	+1.21%
1990	85	−0.29%
1999	74	−1.53%
2007	99	+3.71%
2012	95	−0.82%
2017	99	+0.83%
2023	84	−2.70%
Source: INSEE

== See also ==
- Communes of the Aveyron department
