= Saint-Jean-et-Saint-Paul =

Commune in Occitanie, France

- Commune
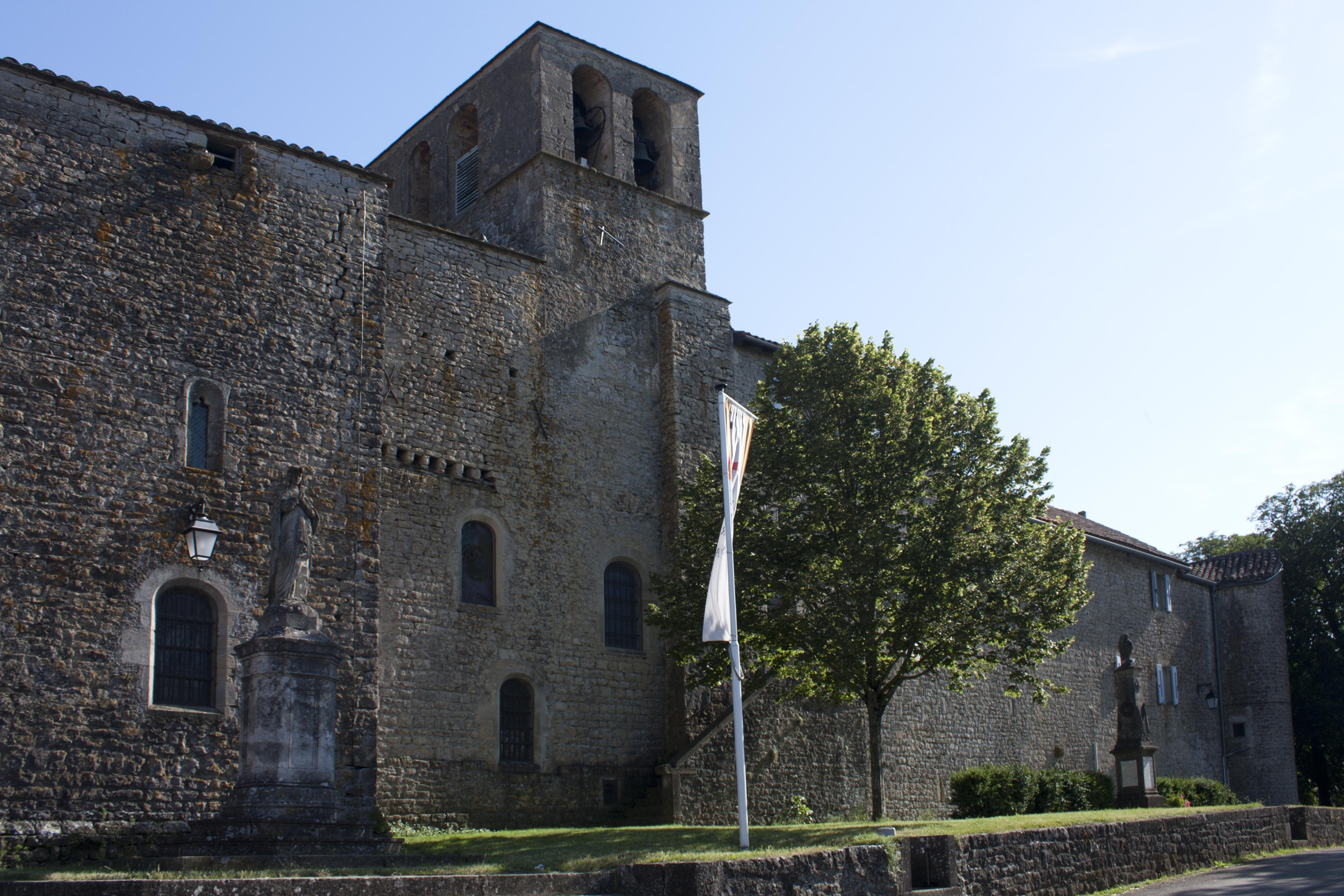
- Saint Jean d'Alcas church

- Coat of arms
- Location of Saint-Jean-et-Saint-Paul
- Location within France Location within Occitanie
- Coordinates: 43°55′41″N 3°00′18″E
- Country: France
- Region: Occitania
- Department: Aveyron
- Arrondissement: Millau
- Canton: Causses-Rougiers
- Intercommunality: Larzac et Vallées

Government
  - Mayor (2020–2026): Anne Calmels
- Area^{1}: 37.91 km^{2} (14.64 sq mi)
- Highest elevation: 825 m (2,707 ft)
- Lowest elevation: 432 m (1,417 ft)
- Population (2023): 282
  - Density: 7.44/km^{2} (19.3/sq mi)
- Time zone: UTC+01:00 (CET)
  - Summer (DST): UTC+02:00 (CEST)
- INSEE/Postal code: 12232 /12250
- ^{1} French Land Register data, which excludes lakes, ponds, glaciers > 1 km^{2} (0.386 sq mi or 247 acres) and river estuaries.

Saint-Jean-et-Saint-Paul (French pronunciation: [sɛ̃ ʒɑ̃ e sɛ̃ pɔl]; Languedocien: Sant Joan e Sant Pau or Sent Joan e Sent Paul) is a commune in the Aveyron department in southern France.

== Population ==
Historical population
| Year | Pop. | ±% p.a. |
|---|---|---|
| 1968 | 303 | — |
| 1975 | 275 | −1.38% |
| 1982 | 242 | −1.81% |
| 1990 | 208 | −1.87% |
| 1999 | 218 | +0.52% |
| 2007 | 261 | +2.28% |
| 2012 | 268 | +0.53% |
| 2017 | 278 | +0.74% |
| 2023 | 282 | +0.24% |
Source: INSEE

== See also ==
- Communes of the Aveyron department
