= Peux-et-Couffouleux =

Commune in Occitanie, France

- Commune
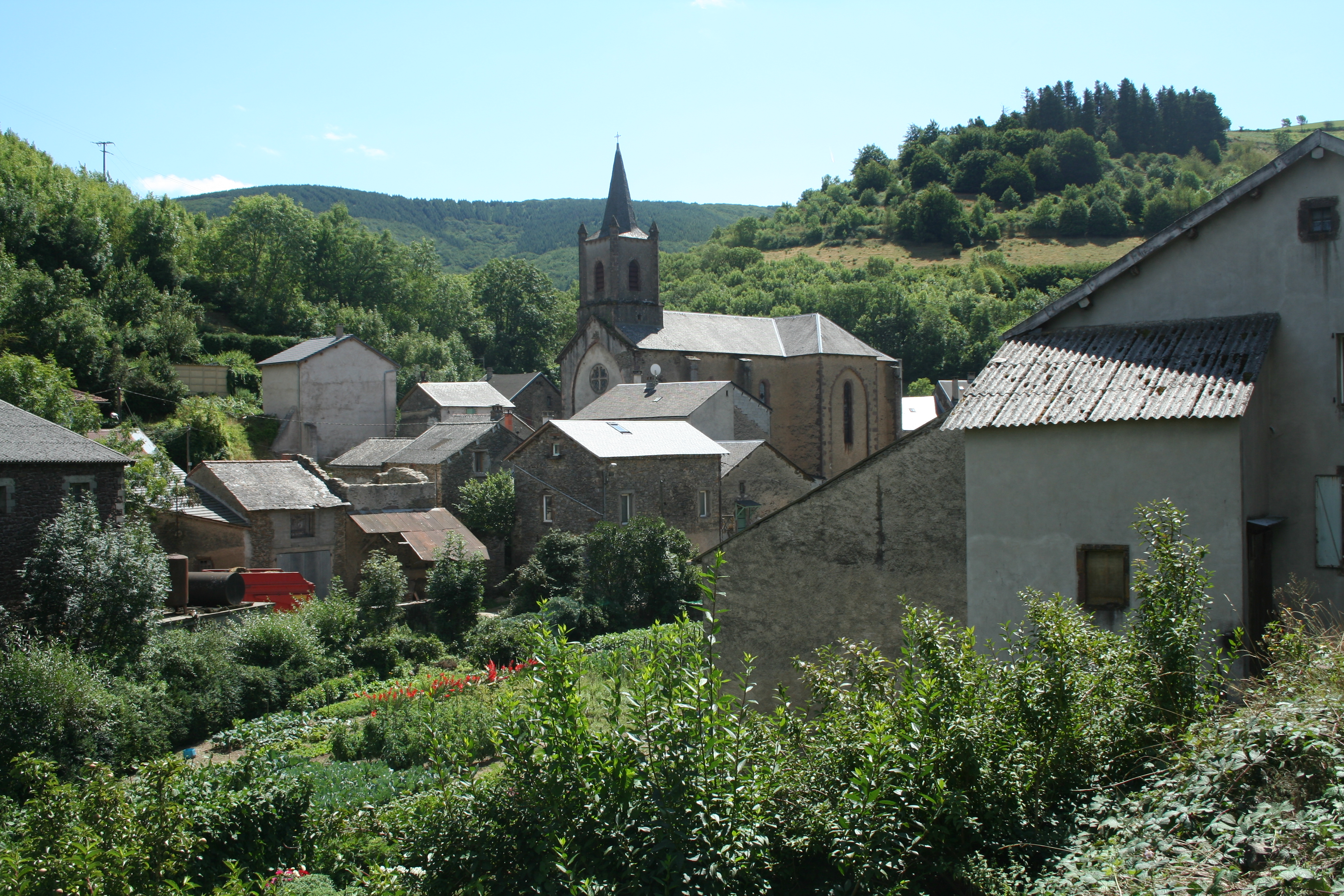
- A general view of Couffouleux
- Location of Peux-et-Couffouleux
- Location within France Location within Occitanie
- Coordinates: 43°46′21″N 2°52′36″E
- Country: France
- Region: Occitania
- Department: Aveyron
- Arrondissement: Millau
- Canton: Causses-Rougiers

Government
  - Mayor (2020–2026): Philippe Giganon
- Area^{1}: 21.71 km^{2} (8.38 sq mi)
- Elevation: 700 m (2,300 ft)
- Highest elevation: 1,092 m (3,583 ft)
- Lowest elevation: 595 m (1,952 ft)
- Population (2023): 86
  - Density: 4.0/km^{2} (10/sq mi)
- Time zone: UTC+01:00 (CET)
  - Summer (DST): UTC+02:00 (CEST)
- INSEE/Postal code: 12179 /12360
- ^{1} French Land Register data, which excludes lakes, ponds, glaciers > 1 km^{2} (0.386 sq mi or 247 acres) and river estuaries.

Peux-et-Couffouleux (French pronunciation: [pø e kufulø]; Occitan: Pèus e Cofolèus) is a commune in the Aveyron department in southern France.

== Population ==
Historical population
Year	Pop.	±% p.a.
1968	235	—
1975	190	−2.99%
1982	162	−2.25%
1990	138	−1.98%
1999	109	−2.59%
2007	110	+0.11%
2012	99	−2.09%
2017	87	−2.55%
2023	86	−0.19%
Source: INSEE

== See also ==
- Communes of the Aveyron department
