= Martrin =

Commune in Occitanie, France

- Commune
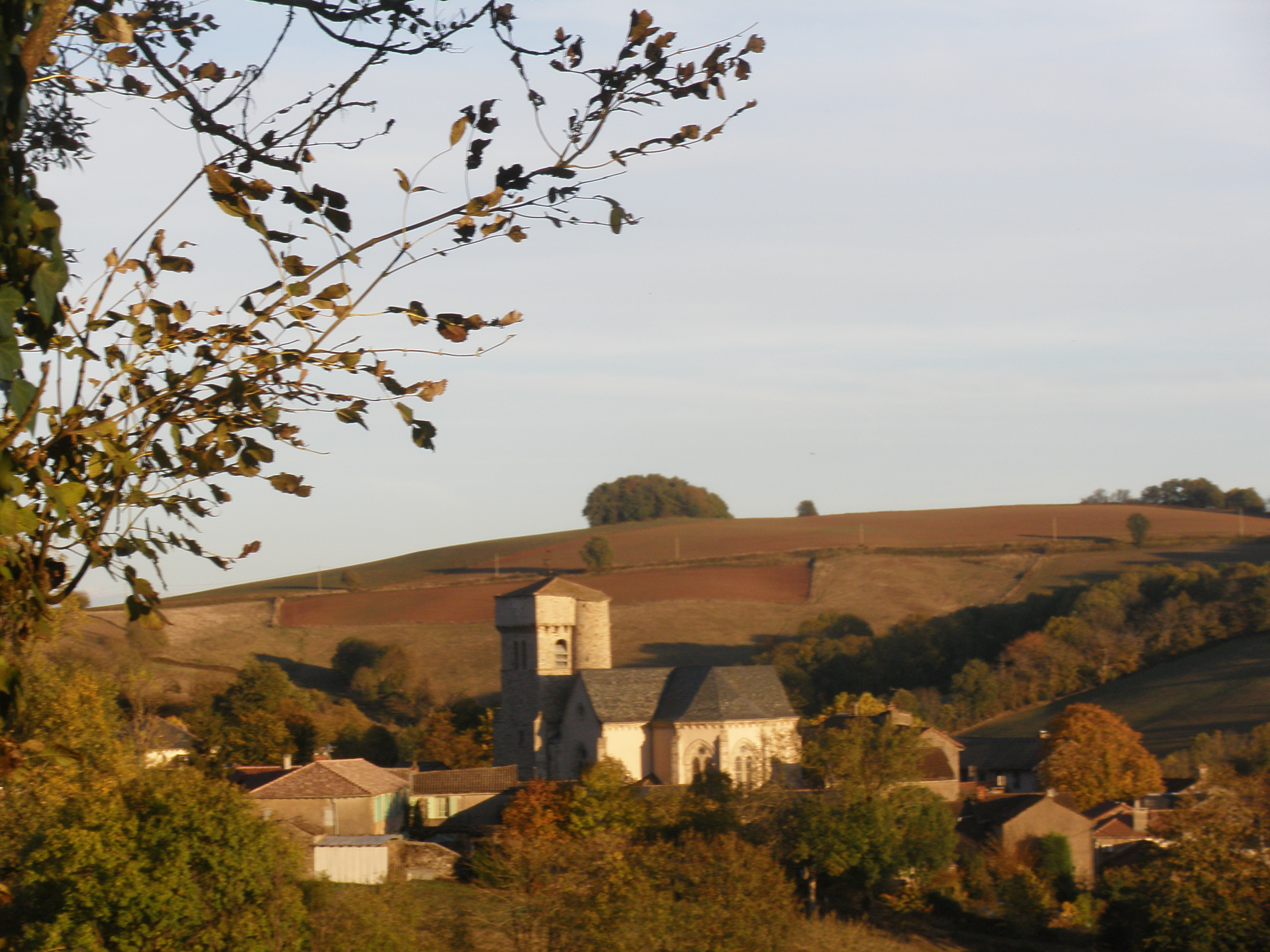
- A general view of Martrin

- Coat of arms
- Location of Martrin
- Location within France Location within Occitanie
- Coordinates: 43°56′22″N 2°37′12″E
- Country: France
- Region: Occitania
- Department: Aveyron
- Arrondissement: Millau
- Canton: Causses-Rougiers
- Intercommunality: Saint Affricain, Roquefort, Sept Vallons

Government
  - Mayor (2020–2026): Christiane Cailliau-Deleu
- Area^{1}: 23.31 km^{2} (9.00 sq mi)
- Elevation: 550 m (1,800 ft)
- Highest elevation: 630 m (2,070 ft)
- Lowest elevation: 311 m (1,020 ft)
- Population (2023): 241
  - Density: 10.3/km^{2} (26.8/sq mi)
- Time zone: UTC+01:00 (CET)
  - Summer (DST): UTC+02:00 (CEST)
- INSEE/Postal code: 12141 /12550
- ^{1} French Land Register data, which excludes lakes, ponds, glaciers > 1 km^{2} (0.386 sq mi or 247 acres) and river estuaries.

Martrin (French pronunciation: [maʁtʁɛ̃]; Occitan: Martrinh) is a commune in the Aveyron department in southern France.

== Population ==
Historical population
Year	Pop.	±% p.a.
1968	366	—
1975	305	−2.57%
1982	272	−1.62%
1990	241	−1.50%
1999	238	−0.14%
2007	216	−1.21%
2012	235	+1.70%
2017	226	−0.78%
2023	241	+1.08%
Source: INSEE

== See also ==
- Communes of the Aveyron department
