= Rebourguil =

Commune in Occitanie, France

- Commune
- Coat of arms
- Location of Rebourguil
- Location within France Location within Occitanie
- Coordinates: 43°53′17″N 2°46′30″E
- Country: France
- Region: Occitania
- Department: Aveyron
- Arrondissement: Millau
- Canton: Causses-Rougiers

Government
  - Mayor (2020–2026): Anne-Claire Solier-Assier
- Area^{1}: 35.31 km^{2} (13.63 sq mi)
- Elevation: 460 m (1,510 ft)
- Highest elevation: 656 m (2,152 ft)
- Lowest elevation: 341 m (1,119 ft)
- Population (2023): 296
  - Density: 8.38/km^{2} (21.7/sq mi)
- Time zone: UTC+01:00 (CET)
  - Summer (DST): UTC+02:00 (CEST)
- INSEE/Postal code: 12195 /12400
- ^{1} French Land Register data, which excludes lakes, ponds, glaciers > 1 km^{2} (0.386 sq mi or 247 acres) and river estuaries.

Rebourguil (French pronunciation: [ʁəbuʁɡil]; Occitan: Reborguil) is a commune in the Aveyron department in southern France.

== Population ==
Historical population
Year	Pop.	±% p.a.
1968	360	—
1975	312	−2.02%
1982	286	−1.24%
1990	251	−1.62%
1999	301	+2.04%
2007	263	−1.67%
2012	274	+0.82%
2017	280	+0.43%
2023	296	+0.93%
Source: INSEE

== See also ==
- Communes of the Aveyron department
