= Saint-Sernin-sur-Rance =

Commune in Occitanie, France

- Commune
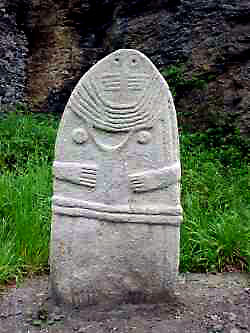
- Menhir La Dame de Saint-Sernin

- Coat of arms
- Location of Saint-Sernin-sur-Rance
- Location within France Location within Occitanie
- Coordinates: 43°53′06″N 2°36′15″E
- Country: France
- Region: Occitania
- Department: Aveyron
- Arrondissement: Millau
- Canton: Causses-Rougiers

Government
  - Mayor (2022–2026): Patrick Roques
- Area^{1}: 11.14 km^{2} (4.30 sq mi)
- Elevation: 290 m (950 ft)
- Highest elevation: 662 m (2,172 ft)
- Lowest elevation: 288 m (945 ft)
- Population (2023): 580
  - Density: 52/km^{2} (130/sq mi)
- Time zone: UTC+01:00 (CET)
  - Summer (DST): UTC+02:00 (CEST)
- INSEE/Postal code: 12248 /12380
- ^{1} French Land Register data, which excludes lakes, ponds, glaciers > 1 km^{2} (0.386 sq mi or 247 acres) and river estuaries.

Saint-Sernin-sur-Rance (French pronunciation: [sɛ̃ sɛʁnɛ̃ syʁ ʁɑ̃s], literally Saint-Sernin on Rance; Occitan: Sent Sarnin) is a commune in the Aveyron department in southern France.

== Population ==
Historical population
Year	Pop.	±% p.a.
1968	693	—
1975	632	−1.31%
1982	604	−0.65%
1990	563	−0.87%
1999	530	−0.67%
2007	663	+2.84%
2012	650	−0.40%
2017	622	−0.88%
2023	580	−1.16%
Source: INSEE

== Notable people ==
- Victor of Aveyron, a feral child, was found in the commune on 8 January 1800.

== See also ==
- Communes of the Aveyron department
