= Montclar, Aveyron =

Commune in Occitanie, France

Montclar
- Commune
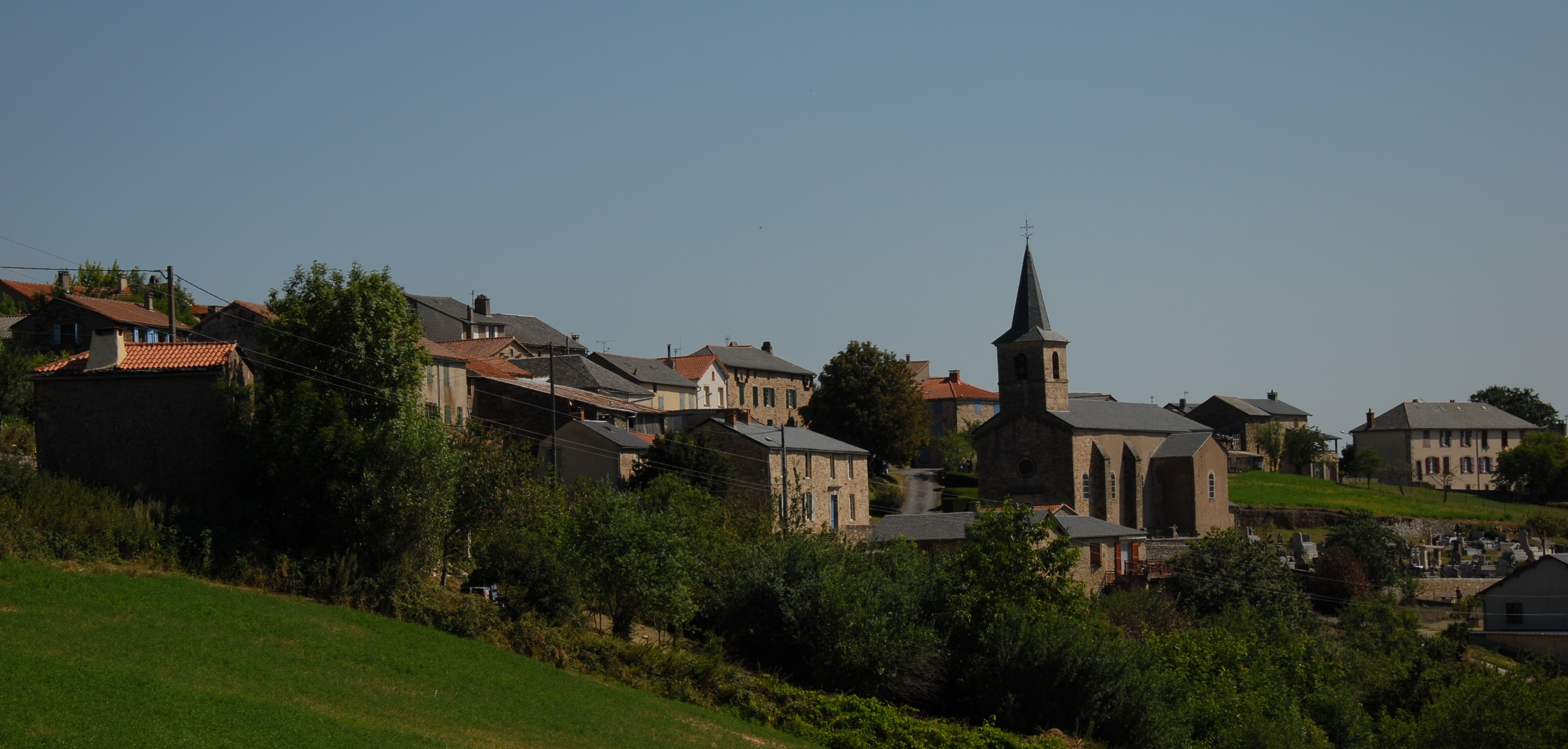
- The church and surrounding buildings in Montclar
- Location of Montclar
- Location within France Location within Occitanie
- Coordinates: 43°58′N 2°39′E
- Country: France
- Region: Occitania
- Department: Aveyron
- Arrondissement: Millau
- Canton: Causses-Rougiers

Government
  - Mayor (2021–2026): Marina Vidal-Condomines
- Area^{1}: 12.80 km^{2} (4.94 sq mi)
- Elevation: 630 m (2,070 ft)
- Highest elevation: 669 m (2,195 ft)
- Lowest elevation: 221 m (725 ft)
- Population (2023): 133
  - Density: 10.4/km^{2} (26.9/sq mi)
- Time zone: UTC+01:00 (CET)
  - Summer (DST): UTC+02:00 (CEST)
- INSEE/Postal code: 12149 /12550
- ^{1} French Land Register data, which excludes lakes, ponds, glaciers > 1 km^{2} (0.386 sq mi or 247 acres) and river estuaries.

Montclar (French pronunciation: [mɔ̃klaʁ]; Occitan: [mũnˈkla]) is a commune in the Aveyron department in southern France.

== See also ==
- Communes of the Aveyron department
