= Montfranc =

Commune in Occitanie, France

- Commune
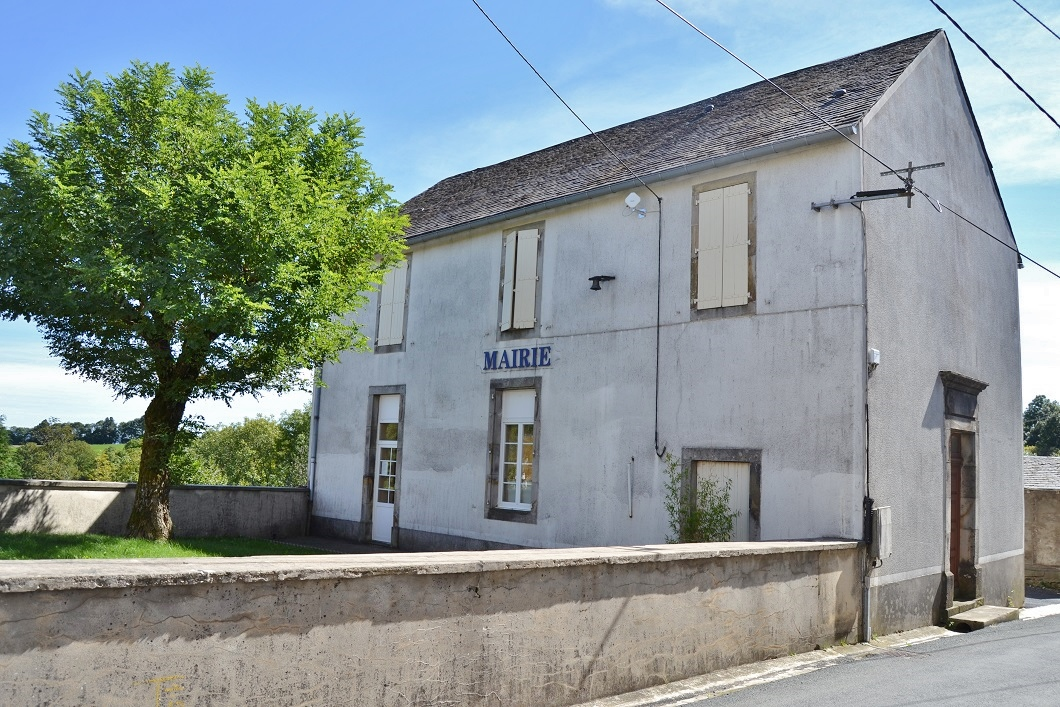
- Town hall
- Location of Montfranc
- Location within France Location within Occitanie
- Coordinates: 43°50′39″N 2°34′05″E
- Country: France
- Region: Occitania
- Department: Aveyron
- Arrondissement: Millau
- Canton: Causses-Rougiers

Government
  - Mayor (2020–2026): Michelle Fontanilles
- Area^{1}: 6.2 km^{2} (2.4 sq mi)
- Elevation: 835 m (2,740 ft)
- Highest elevation: 834 m (2,736 ft)
- Lowest elevation: 595 m (1,952 ft)
- Population (2023): 130
  - Density: 21/km^{2} (54/sq mi)
- Time zone: UTC+01:00 (CET)
  - Summer (DST): UTC+02:00 (CEST)
- INSEE/Postal code: 12152 /12380
- ^{1} French Land Register data, which excludes lakes, ponds, glaciers > 1 km^{2} (0.386 sq mi or 247 acres) and river estuaries.

Montfranc (French pronunciation: [mɔ̃fʁɑ̃]) is a commune in the Aveyron department in southern France.

== Population ==
Historical population
Year	Pop.	±% p.a.
1968	181	—
1975	154	−2.28%
1982	168	+1.25%
1990	158	−0.76%
1999	135	−1.73%
2007	135	+0.00%
2012	123	−1.84%
2017	124	+0.16%
2023	130	+0.79%
Source: INSEE

== See also ==
- Communes of the Aveyron department
