= Mounes-Prohencoux =

Commune in Occitanie, France

- Commune
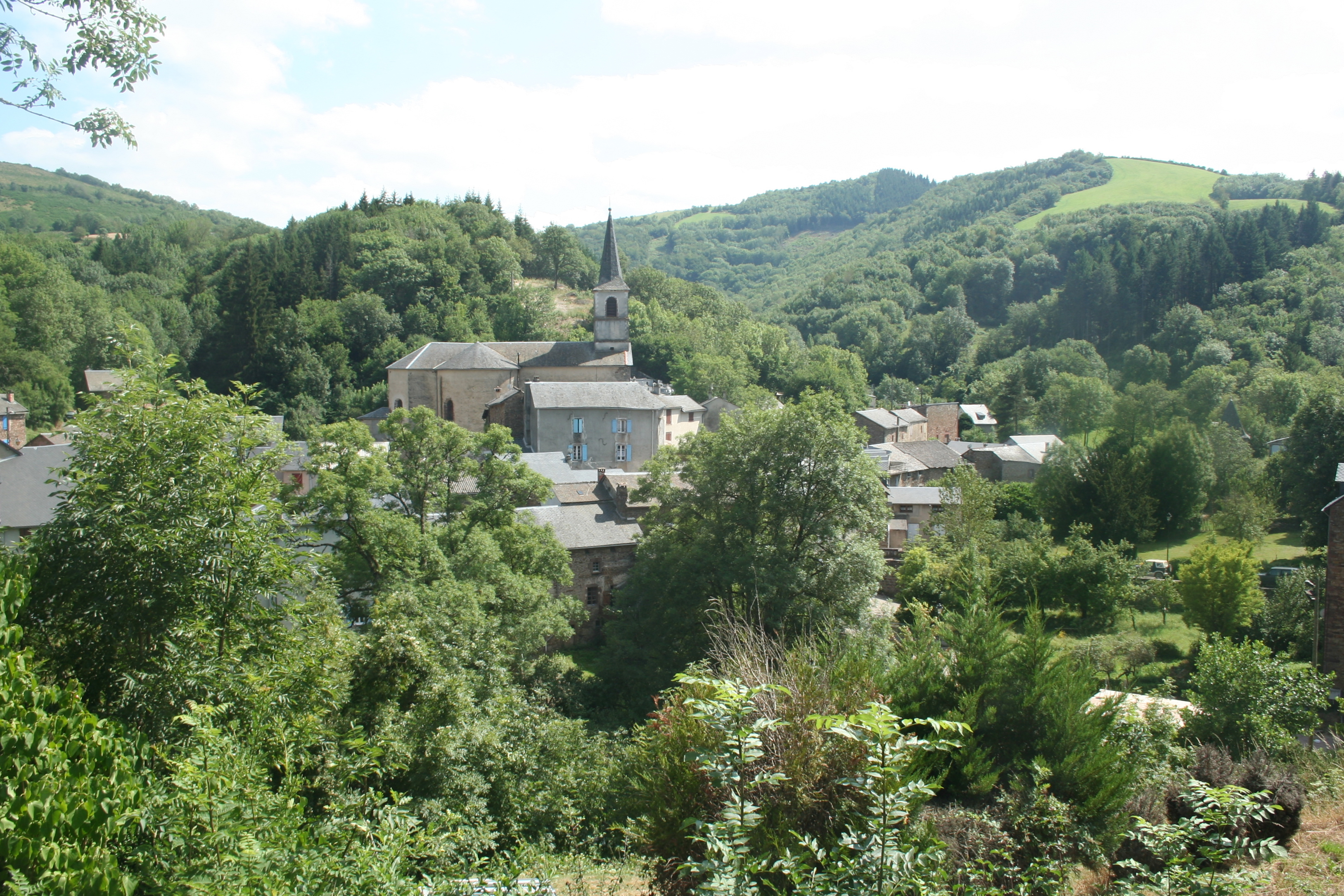
- A general view of Mounes
- Location of Mounes-Prohencoux
- Location within France Location within Occitanie
- Coordinates: 43°47′16″N 2°51′15″E
- Country: France
- Region: Occitania
- Department: Aveyron
- Arrondissement: Millau
- Canton: Causses-Rougiers

Government
  - Mayor (2020–2026): Michel Leblond
- Area^{1}: 37.62 km^{2} (14.53 sq mi)
- Elevation: 620 m (2,030 ft)
- Highest elevation: 951 m (3,120 ft)
- Lowest elevation: 440 m (1,440 ft)
- Population (2023): 193
  - Density: 5.13/km^{2} (13.3/sq mi)
- Time zone: UTC+01:00 (CET)
  - Summer (DST): UTC+02:00 (CEST)
- INSEE/Postal code: 12192 /12370
- ^{1} French Land Register data, which excludes lakes, ponds, glaciers > 1 km^{2} (0.386 sq mi or 247 acres) and river estuaries.

Mounes-Prohencoux (French pronunciation: [mun pʁɔɑ̃ku]; Occitan: Monés e Proencós) is a commune in the Aveyron department in southern France.

== Population ==
Historical population
Year	Pop.	±% p.a.
1968	344	—
1975	266	−3.61%
1982	243	−1.28%
1990	233	−0.52%
1999	190	−2.24%
2007	197	+0.45%
2012	180	−1.79%
2017	182	+0.22%
2023	193	+0.98%
Source: INSEE

== See also ==
- Communes of the Aveyron department
