= Sauclières =

Commune in Occitanie, France

- Commune
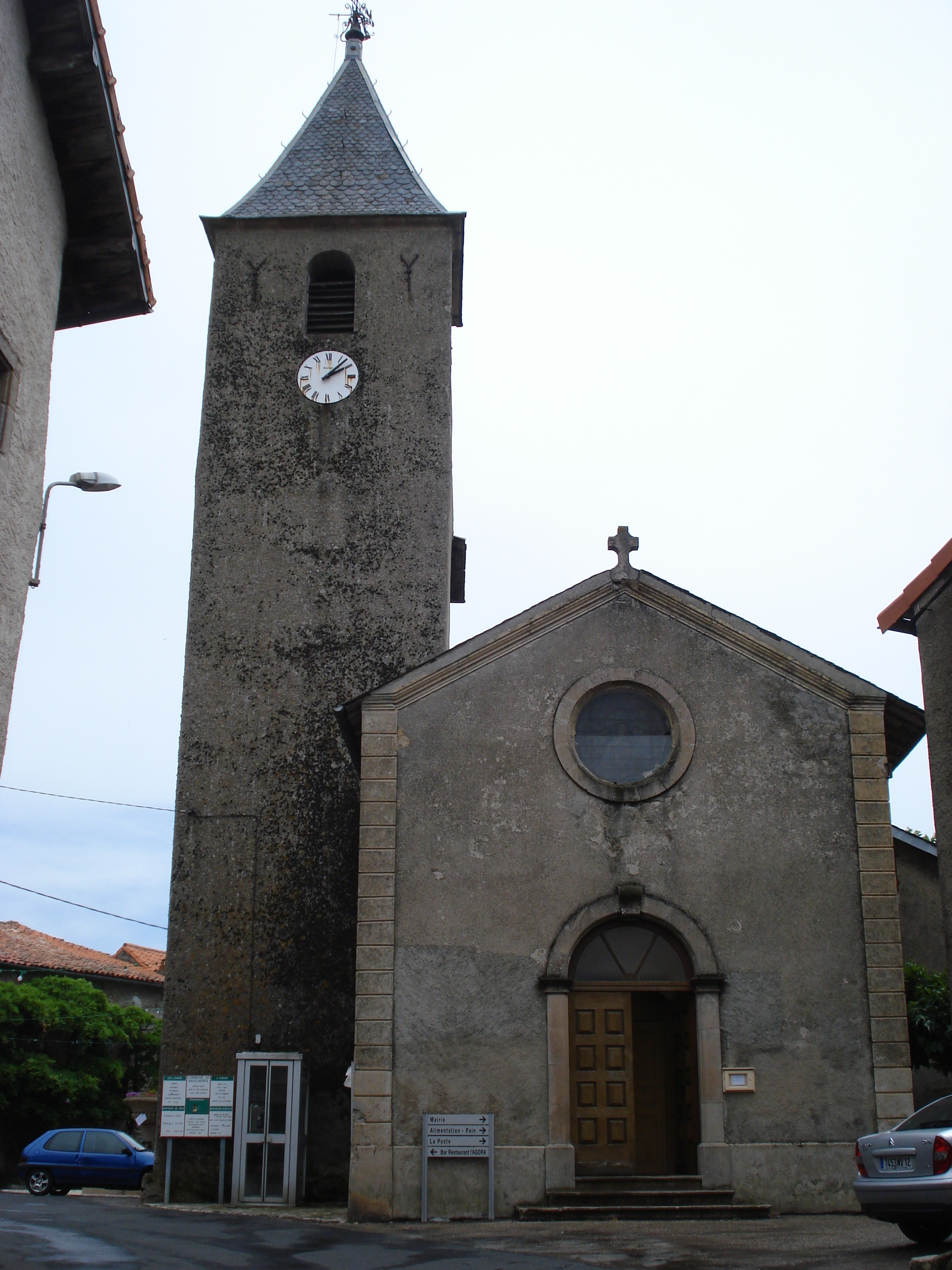
- The church in Sauclières

- Coat of arms
- Location of Sauclières
- Location within France Location within Occitanie
- Coordinates: 43°58′37″N 3°22′04″E
- Country: France
- Region: Occitania
- Department: Aveyron
- Arrondissement: Millau
- Canton: Causses-Rougiers

Government
  - Mayor (2020–2026): Bernadette Negros
- Area^{1}: 38.81 km^{2} (14.98 sq mi)
- Elevation: 750 m (2,460 ft)
- Highest elevation: 1,341 m (4,400 ft)
- Lowest elevation: 580 m (1,900 ft)
- Population (2023): 188
  - Density: 4.84/km^{2} (12.5/sq mi)
- Time zone: UTC+01:00 (CET)
  - Summer (DST): UTC+02:00 (CEST)
- INSEE/Postal code: 12260 /12230
- ^{1} French Land Register data, which excludes lakes, ponds, glaciers > 1 km^{2} (0.386 sq mi or 247 acres) and river estuaries.

Sauclières (French pronunciation: [soklijɛʁ]; Occitan: Sauclièiras) is a commune in the Aveyron department in southern France.

== Population ==
Historical population
Year	Pop.	±% p.a.
1968	242	—
1975	198	−2.83%
1982	173	−1.91%
1990	202	+1.96%
1999	189	−0.74%
2007	187	−0.13%
2012	147	−4.70%
2017	170	+2.95%
2023	188	+1.69%
Source: INSEE

== See also ==
- Communes of the Aveyron department
