= Murasson =

Commune in Occitanie, France

- Commune
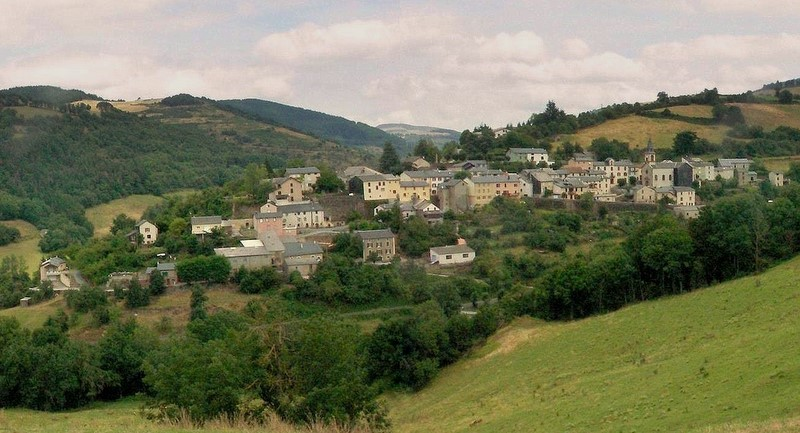
- A general view of Murasson
- Location of Murasson
- Location within France Location within Occitanie
- Coordinates: 43°45′40″N 2°45′54″E
- Country: France
- Region: Occitania
- Department: Aveyron
- Arrondissement: Millau
- Canton: Causses-Rougiers

Government
  - Mayor (2023–2026): Céline Ginieis
- Area^{1}: 40.25 km^{2} (15.54 sq mi)
- Elevation: 600 m (2,000 ft)
- Highest elevation: 1,013 m (3,323 ft)
- Lowest elevation: 473 m (1,552 ft)
- Population (2023): 204
  - Density: 5.07/km^{2} (13.1/sq mi)
- Time zone: UTC+01:00 (CET)
  - Summer (DST): UTC+02:00 (CEST)
- INSEE/Postal code: 12163 /12370
- ^{1} French Land Register data, which excludes lakes, ponds, glaciers > 1 km^{2} (0.386 sq mi or 247 acres) and river estuaries.

Murasson (French pronunciation: [myʁasɔ̃]) is a commune in the Aveyron department in southern France.

== Population ==
Historical population
| Year | Pop. | ±% p.a. |
|---|---|---|
| 1968 | 362 | — |
| 1975 | 299 | −2.69% |
| 1982 | 266 | −1.66% |
| 1990 | 235 | −1.54% |
| 1999 | 212 | −1.14% |
| 2007 | 204 | −0.48% |
| 2012 | 189 | −1.52% |
| 2017 | 194 | +0.52% |
| 2023 | 204 | +0.84% |
Source: INSEE

== See also ==
- Communes of the Aveyron department
