= Brasc =

Commune in Occitanie, France

- Commune
- Location of Brasc
- Location within France Location within Occitanie
- Coordinates: 43°58′45″N 2°34′26″E
- Country: France
- Region: Occitania
- Department: Aveyron
- Arrondissement: Millau
- Canton: Causses-Rougiers

Government
  - Mayor (2020–2026): Jean-Charles Alibert
- Area^{1}: 20.14 km^{2} (7.78 sq mi)
- Elevation: 590 m (1,940 ft)
- Highest elevation: 658 m (2,159 ft)
- Lowest elevation: 214 m (702 ft)
- Population (2023): 170
  - Density: 8.4/km^{2} (22/sq mi)
- Time zone: UTC+01:00 (CET)
  - Summer (DST): UTC+02:00 (CEST)
- INSEE/Postal code: 12035 /12550
- ^{1} French Land Register data, which excludes lakes, ponds, glaciers > 1 km^{2} (0.386 sq mi or 247 acres) and river estuaries.

Brasc (French pronunciation: [bʁask]) is a commune in the Aveyron department in southern France.

== Population ==
Historical population
Year	Pop.	±% p.a.
1968	309	—
1975	271	−1.86%
1982	244	−1.49%
1990	190	−3.08%
1999	174	−0.97%
2007	200	+1.76%
2012	177	−2.41%
2017	167	−1.16%
2023	170	+0.30%
Source: INSEE

== See also ==
- Communes of the Aveyron department
