= Coupiac =

Commune in Occitanie, France

- Commune
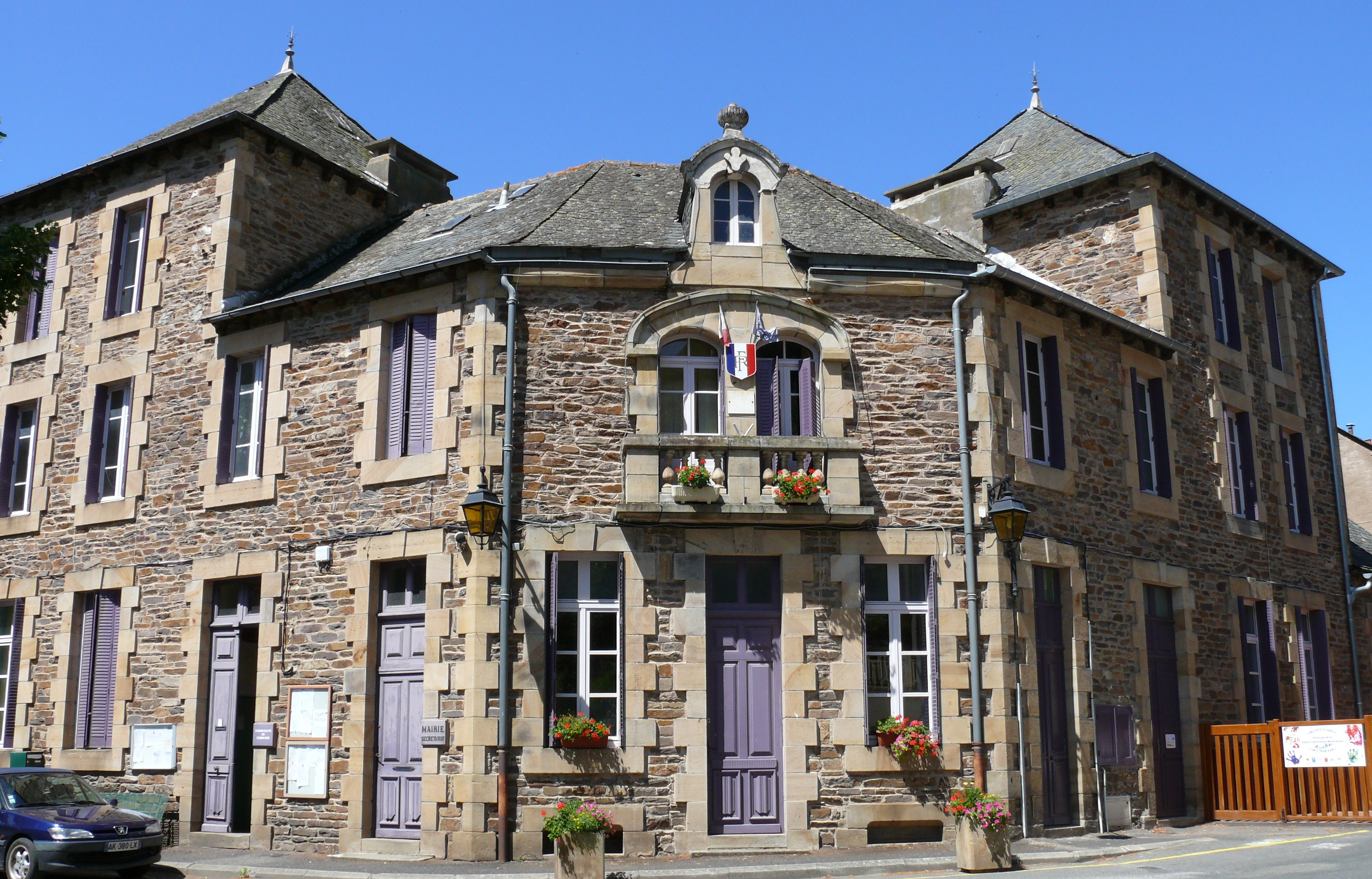
- Town hall

- Coat of arms
- Location of Coupiac
- Location within France Location within Occitanie
- Coordinates: 43°57′15″N 2°34′57″E
- Country: France
- Region: Occitania
- Department: Aveyron
- Arrondissement: Millau
- Canton: Causses-Rougiers

Government
  - Mayor (2020–2026): Jean-Claude Souyris
- Area^{1}: 24.72 km^{2} (9.54 sq mi)
- Elevation: 380 m (1,250 ft)
- Highest elevation: 649 m (2,129 ft)
- Lowest elevation: 278 m (912 ft)
- Population (2023): 353
  - Density: 14.3/km^{2} (37.0/sq mi)
- Time zone: UTC+01:00 (CET)
  - Summer (DST): UTC+02:00 (CEST)
- INSEE/Postal code: 12080 /12550
- ^{1} French Land Register data, which excludes lakes, ponds, glaciers > 1 km^{2} (0.386 sq mi or 247 acres) and river estuaries.

Coupiac (French pronunciation: [kupjak]; Occitan: Copiac) is a commune in the Aveyron department in southern France.

== Population ==
Historical population
Year	Pop.	±% p.a.
1968	662	—
1975	663	+0.02%
1982	718	+1.14%
1990	629	−1.64%
1999	535	−1.78%
2007	486	−1.19%
2012	438	−2.06%
2017	392	−2.19%
2023	353	−1.73%
Source: INSEE

== See also ==
- Communes of the Aveyron department
