= Canton of Causses-Rougiers =

Coordinates: 44.01°N 3.16°E

- Canton
- Situation of the canton of Causses-Rougiers in the department of Aveyron
- Country: France
- Region: Occitania
- Department: Aveyron
- No. of communes: {{{nbcomm}}}
- Population (2023): 12,793
- INSEE code: 1204

The canton of Causses-Rougiers is an administrative division of the Aveyron department, southern France. It was created at the French canton reorganisation which came into effect in March 2015. Its seat is in La Cavalerie.

It consists of the following communes:

1. Arnac-sur-Dourdou
2. Balaguier-sur-Rance
3. La Bastide-Solages
4. Belmont-sur-Rance
5. Brasc
6. Brusque
7. Camarès
8. La Cavalerie
9. Le Clapier
10. Combret
11. Cornus
12. Coupiac
13. La Couvertoirade
14. Fayet
15. Fondamente
16. Gissac
17. L'Hospitalet-du-Larzac
18. Lapanouse-de-Cernon
19. Laval-Roquecezière
20. Marnhagues-et-Latour
21. Martrin
22. Mélagues
23. Montagnol
24. Montclar
25. Montfranc
26. Montlaur
27. Mounes-Prohencoux
28. Murasson
29. Peux-et-Couffouleux
30. Plaisance
31. Pousthomy
32. Rebourguil
33. Saint-Beaulize
34. Sainte-Eulalie-de-Cernon
35. Saint-Jean-et-Saint-Paul
36. Saint-Juéry
37. Saint-Sernin-sur-Rance
38. Saint-Sever-du-Moustier
39. Sauclières
40. La Serre
41. Sylvanès
42. Tauriac-de-Camarès
43. Viala-du-Pas-de-Jaux
