= Laval-Roquecezière =

Commune in Occitanie, France

- Commune
- Location of Laval-Roquecezière
- Location within France Location within Occitanie
- Coordinates: 43°48′28″N 2°38′55″E
- Country: France
- Region: Occitania
- Department: Aveyron
- Arrondissement: Millau
- Canton: Causses-Rougiers

Government
  - Mayor (2020–2026): Patrice Viala
- Area^{1}: 30.66 km^{2} (11.84 sq mi)
- Elevation: 500 m (1,600 ft)
- Highest elevation: 932 m (3,058 ft)
- Lowest elevation: 329 m (1,079 ft)
- Population (2023): 303
  - Density: 9.88/km^{2} (25.6/sq mi)
- Time zone: UTC+01:00 (CET)
  - Summer (DST): UTC+02:00 (CEST)
- INSEE/Postal code: 12125 /12380
- ^{1} French Land Register data, which excludes lakes, ponds, glaciers > 1 km^{2} (0.386 sq mi or 247 acres) and river estuaries.

Laval-Roquecezière is a commune in the Aveyron department in southern France.

== Population ==
Historical population
Year	Pop.	±% p.a.
1968	656	—
1975	596	−1.36%
1982	474	−3.22%
1990	391	−2.38%
1999	340	−1.54%
2007	310	−1.15%
2012	259	−3.53%
2017	282	+1.72%
2023	303	+1.20%
Source: INSEE

== See also ==
- Communes of the Aveyron department
