= Combret =

Commune in Occitanie, France

- Commune
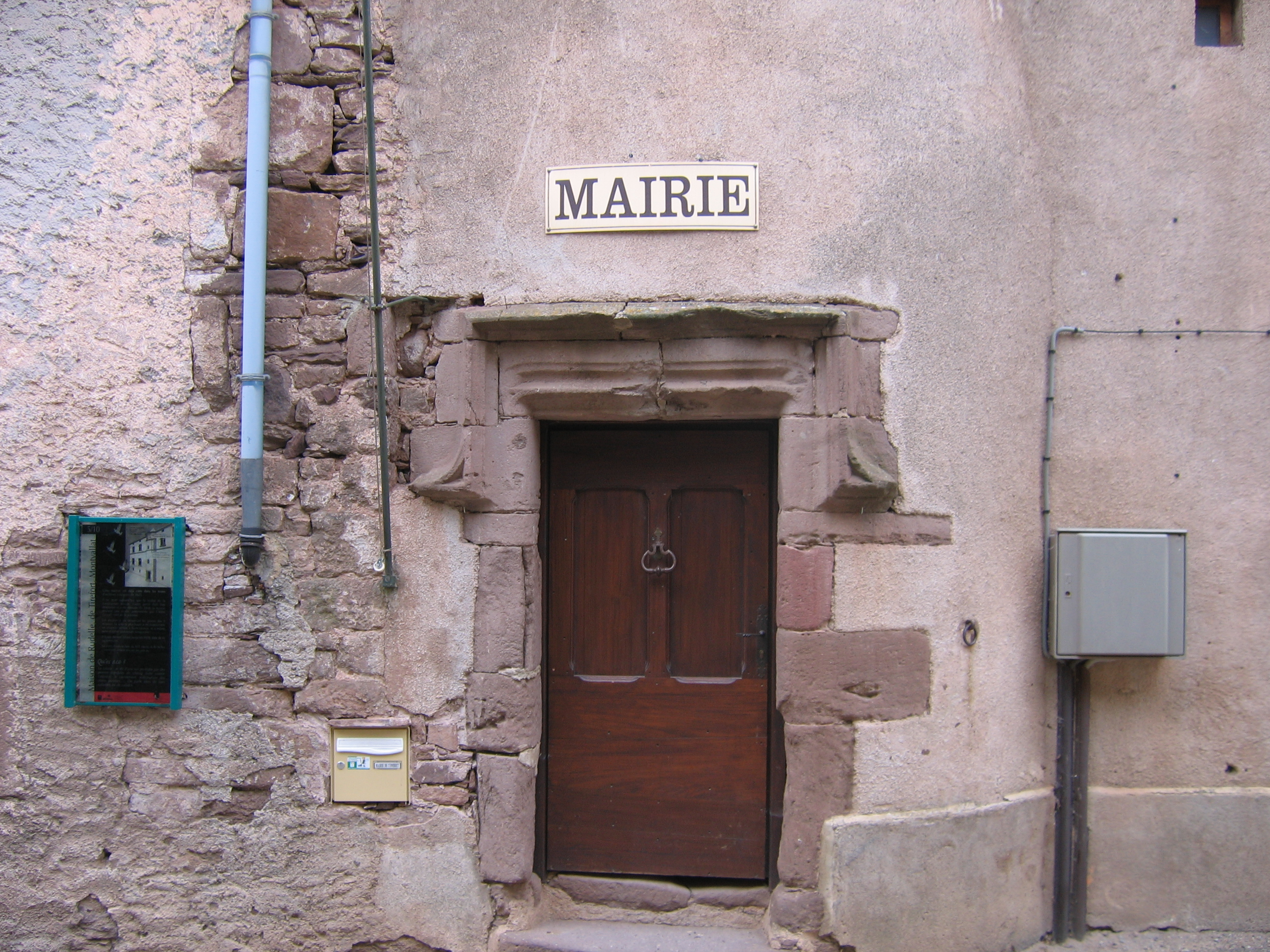
- Town hall

- Coat of arms
- Location of Combret
- Location within France Location within Occitanie
- Coordinates: 43°50′33″N 2°40′24″E
- Country: France
- Region: Occitania
- Department: Aveyron
- Arrondissement: Millau
- Canton: Causses-Rougiers
- Intercommunality: Monts, Rance et Rougier

Government
  - Mayor (2020–2026): Jean-Philippe Sabathier
- Area^{1}: 49.85 km^{2} (19.25 sq mi)
- Elevation: 370 m (1,210 ft)
- Highest elevation: 919 m (3,015 ft)
- Lowest elevation: 326 m (1,070 ft)
- Population (2023): 263
  - Density: 5.28/km^{2} (13.7/sq mi)
- Time zone: UTC+01:00 (CET)
  - Summer (DST): UTC+02:00 (CEST)
- INSEE/Postal code: 12069 /12370
- ^{1} French Land Register data, which excludes lakes, ponds, glaciers > 1 km^{2} (0.386 sq mi or 247 acres) and river estuaries.

Combret (French pronunciation: [kɔ̃bʁɛ]) is a commune in the Aveyron department in southern France. It has a bridge over the river Rance, which runs alongside the village.

== Population ==
Historical population
Year	Pop.	±% p.a.
1968	462	—
1975	370	−3.12%
1982	327	−1.75%
1990	271	−2.32%
1999	296	+0.99%
2007	296	+0.00%
2012	294	−0.14%
2017	270	−1.69%
2023	263	−0.44%
Source: INSEE

== Administration ==
Claude Barthélémy was the mayor between 2001 and 2020. Jean-Philippe Sabathier was elected mayor in 2020.

== See also ==
- Communes of the Aveyron department
