= Lapanouse-de-Cernon =

Commune in Occitanie, France

- Commune
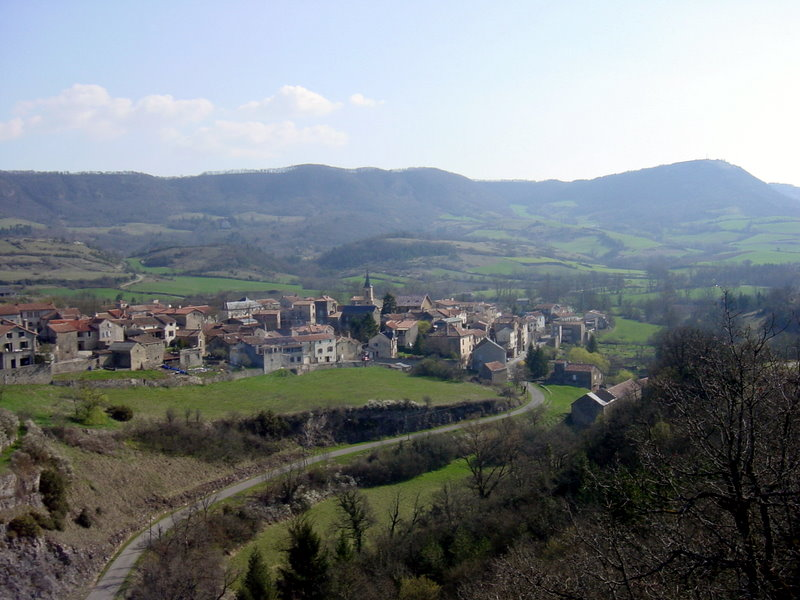
- A general view of Lapanouse-de-Cernon
- Location of Lapanouse-de-Cernon
- Location within France Location within Occitanie
- Coordinates: 43°59′48″N 3°05′54″E
- Country: France
- Region: Occitania
- Department: Aveyron
- Arrondissement: Millau
- Canton: Causses-Rougiers

Government
  - Mayor (2020–2026): Stéphanie Andrieu
- Area^{1}: 22.87 km^{2} (8.83 sq mi)
- Elevation: 520 m (1,710 ft)
- Highest elevation: 880 m (2,890 ft)
- Lowest elevation: 473 m (1,552 ft)
- Population (2023): 119
  - Density: 5.20/km^{2} (13.5/sq mi)
- Time zone: UTC+01:00 (CET)
  - Summer (DST): UTC+02:00 (CEST)
- INSEE/Postal code: 12122 /12230
- ^{1} French Land Register data, which excludes lakes, ponds, glaciers > 1 km^{2} (0.386 sq mi or 247 acres) and river estuaries.

Lapanouse-de-Cernon (French pronunciation: [lapanuz də sɛʁnɔ̃]; Occitan: La Panosa de Sarnon) is a commune in the Aveyron department in southern France.

== Population ==
Historical population
Year	Pop.	±% p.a.
1968	152	—
1975	130	−2.21%
1982	142	+1.27%
1990	111	−3.03%
1999	99	−1.26%
2007	116	+2.00%
2012	122	+1.01%
2017	123	+0.16%
2023	119	−0.55%
Source: INSEE

== See also ==
- Communes of the Aveyron department
