= Camarès =

Commune in Occitanie, France

- Commune
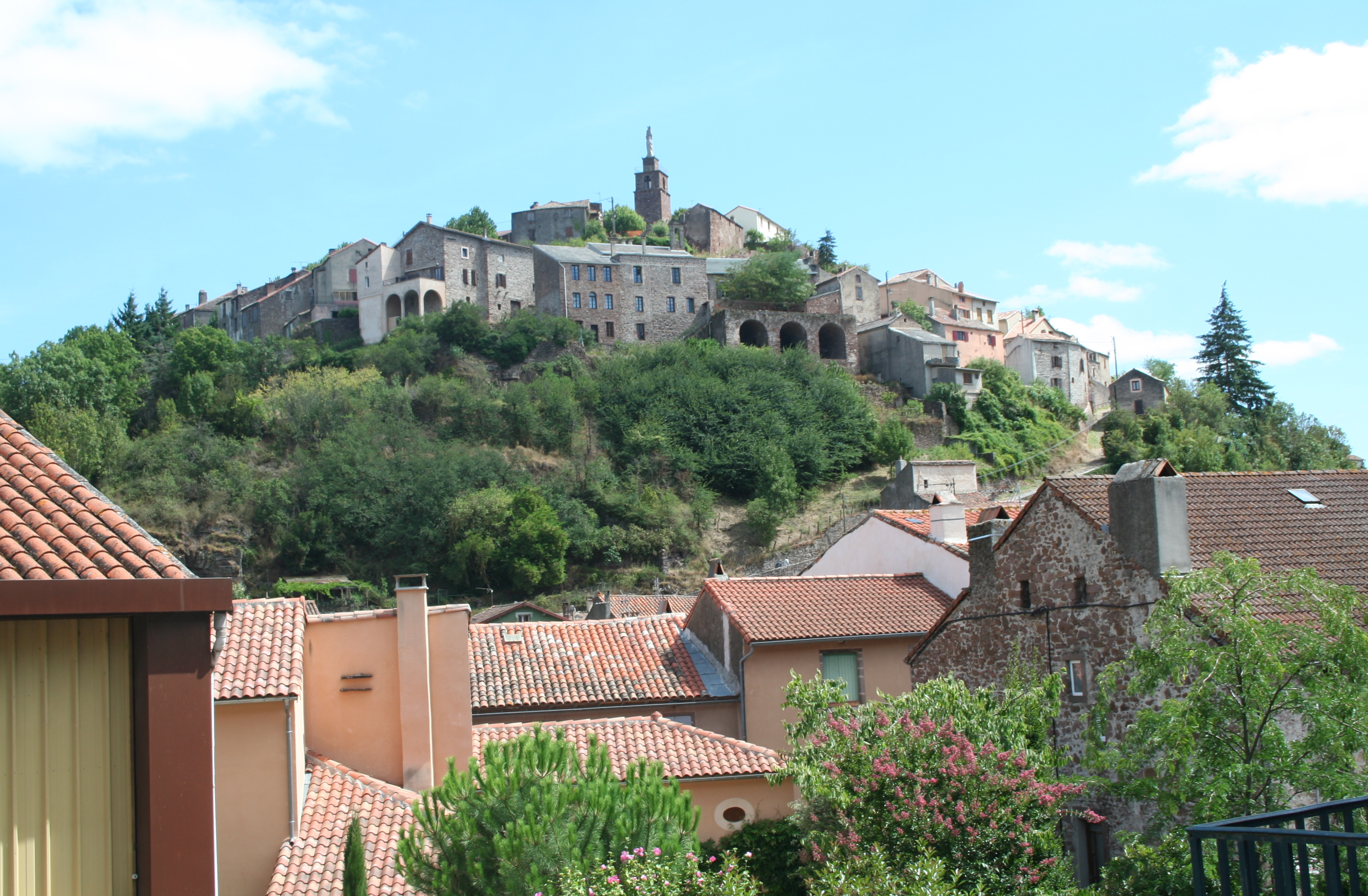
- A general view of Camarès

- Coat of arms
- Location of Camarès
- Location within France Location within Occitanie
- Coordinates: 43°49′24″N 2°52′49″E
- Country: France
- Region: Occitania
- Department: Aveyron
- Arrondissement: Millau
- Canton: Causses-Rougiers

Government
  - Mayor (2020–2026): Cyril Touzet
- Area^{1}: 41.86 km^{2} (16.16 sq mi)
- Elevation: 383 m (1,257 ft)
- Highest elevation: 968 m (3,176 ft)
- Lowest elevation: 356 m (1,168 ft)
- Population (2023): 1,030
  - Density: 24.6/km^{2} (63.7/sq mi)
- Time zone: UTC+01:00 (CET)
  - Summer (DST): UTC+02:00 (CEST)
- INSEE/Postal code: 12044 /12360
- ^{1} French Land Register data, which excludes lakes, ponds, glaciers > 1 km^{2} (0.386 sq mi or 247 acres) and river estuaries.

Camarès (French pronunciation: [kamaʁɛs]; Occitan: Lo Pont de Camarés) is a commune in the Aveyron department in southern France.

== Geography ==
Situated 23 kilometres south of Saint-Affrique and 80 kilometres from Béziers, the commune is traversed by the Dourdou de Camarès and sits at the foot of the Monts de Lacaune.

Its red soil, le rougier, is a schistose sandstone. It covers a rich substrate which was exploited for the first mines of copper and argentiferous lead during the Gallo-Roman era.

The commune includes a thermal basin with springs that are no longer in use today: Prugnes les eaux, Andabre, Le Cayla et Sylvanès (eau thermale).

== Population ==
Historical population
Year	Pop.	±% p.a.
1968	1,253	—
1975	1,212	−0.47%
1982	1,258	+0.53%
1990	1,127	−1.37%
1999	1,008	−1.23%
2007	979	−0.36%
2012	987	+0.16%
2017	1,038	+1.01%
2023	1,030	−0.13%
Source: INSEE

== See also ==
- Communes of the Aveyron department
- List of medieval bridges in France
