= Mélagues =

Commune in Occitanie, France

- Commune
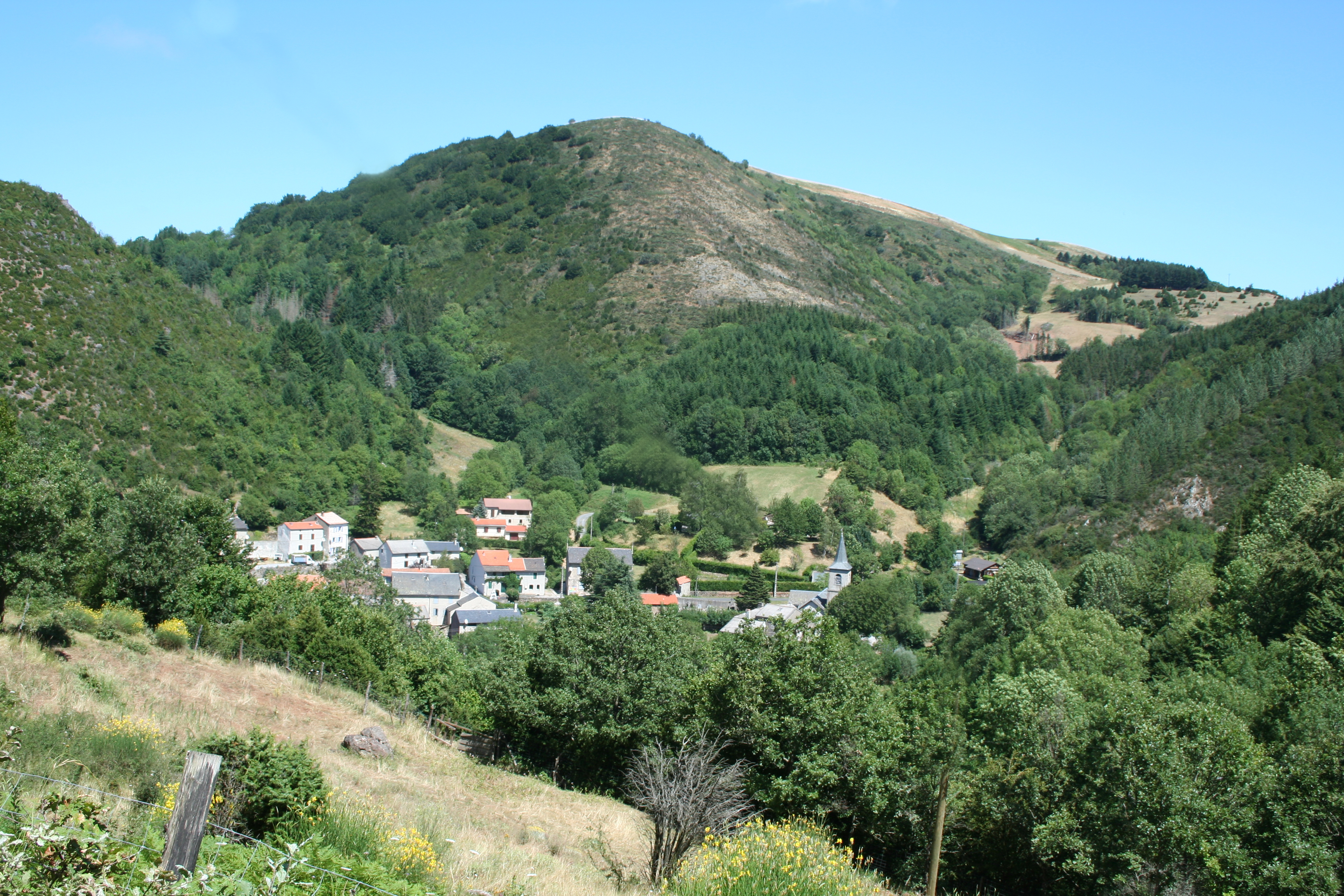
- A general view of Mélagues
- Location of Mélagues
- Location within France Location within Occitanie
- Coordinates: 43°44′25″N 3°01′06″E
- Country: France
- Region: Occitania
- Department: Aveyron
- Arrondissement: Millau
- Canton: Causses-Rougiers

Government
  - Mayor (2020–2026): Jean Milesi
- Area^{1}: 44.51 km^{2} (17.19 sq mi)
- Elevation: 680 m (2,230 ft)
- Highest elevation: 1,067 m (3,501 ft)
- Lowest elevation: 554 m (1,818 ft)
- Population (2023): 53
  - Density: 1.2/km^{2} (3.1/sq mi)
- Time zone: UTC+01:00 (CET)
  - Summer (DST): UTC+02:00 (CEST)
- INSEE/Postal code: 12143 /12360
- ^{1} French Land Register data, which excludes lakes, ponds, glaciers > 1 km^{2} (0.386 sq mi or 247 acres) and river estuaries.

Mélagues (French pronunciation: [melaɡ]; Occitan: Melagas) is a commune in the Aveyron department in southern France.

== Population ==
Historical population
Year	Pop.	±% p.a.
1968	107	—
1975	113	+0.78%
1982	94	−2.60%
1990	106	+1.51%
1999	102	−0.43%
2007	67	−5.12%
2012	62	−1.54%
2017	60	−0.65%
2023	53	−2.05%
Source: INSEE

== See also ==
- Communes of the Aveyron department
