= Plaisance, Aveyron =

Commune in Occitanie, France

Plaisance
- Commune
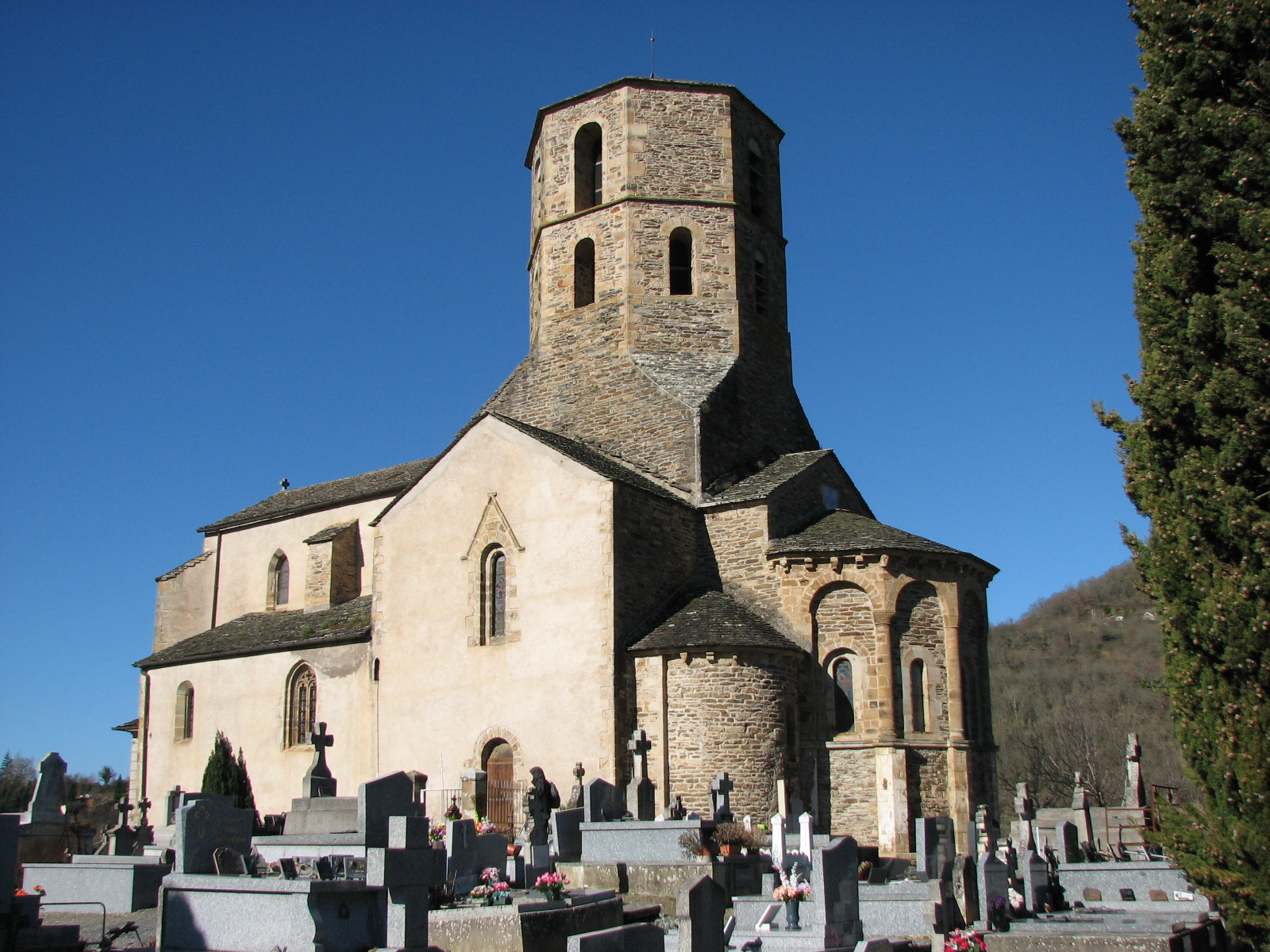
- The church in Plaisance
- Location of Plaisance
- Location within France Location within Occitanie
- Coordinates: 43°55′40″N 2°32′53″E
- Country: France
- Region: Occitania
- Department: Aveyron
- Arrondissement: Millau
- Canton: Causses-Rougiers

Government
  - Mayor (2020–2026): Thierry Arnal
- Area^{1}: 14 km^{2} (5.4 sq mi)
- Elevation: 360 m (1,180 ft)
- Highest elevation: 647 m (2,123 ft)
- Lowest elevation: 229 m (751 ft)
- Population (2023): 219
  - Density: 16/km^{2} (41/sq mi)
- Time zone: UTC+01:00 (CET)
  - Summer (DST): UTC+02:00 (CEST)
- INSEE/Postal code: 12183 /12550
- ^{1} French Land Register data, which excludes lakes, ponds, glaciers > 1 km^{2} (0.386 sq mi or 247 acres) and river estuaries.

Plaisance (French pronunciation: [plɛzɑ̃s]; Occitan: Plasença) is a commune in the Aveyron department in southern France.

== Population ==
Historical population
Year	Pop.	±% p.a.
1968	318	—
1975	280	−1.80%
1982	282	+0.10%
1990	228	−2.62%
1999	228	+0.00%
2007	227	−0.05%
2012	203	−2.21%
2017	221	+1.71%
2023	219	−0.15%
Source: INSEE

== See also ==
- Communes of the Aveyron department
