= Saint-Sever-du-Moustier =

Commune in Occitanie, France

- Commune
- Location of Saint-Sever-du-Moustier
- Location within France Location within Occitanie
- Coordinates: 43°46′36″N 2°42′02″E
- Country: France
- Region: Occitania
- Department: Aveyron
- Arrondissement: Millau
- Canton: Causses-Rougiers

Government
  - Mayor (2020–2026): Eric Houles
- Area^{1}: 26.03 km^{2} (10.05 sq mi)
- Elevation: 525 m (1,722 ft)
- Highest elevation: 964 m (3,163 ft)
- Lowest elevation: 456 m (1,496 ft)
- Population (2023): 179
  - Density: 6.88/km^{2} (17.8/sq mi)
- Time zone: UTC+01:00 (CET)
  - Summer (DST): UTC+02:00 (CEST)
- INSEE/Postal code: 12249 /12370
- ^{1} French Land Register data, which excludes lakes, ponds, glaciers > 1 km^{2} (0.386 sq mi or 247 acres) and river estuaries.

Saint-Sever-du-Moustier is a commune in the Aveyron department in southern France.

== Population ==
Historical population
Year	Pop.	±% p.a.
1968	419	—
1975	360	−2.14%
1982	282	−3.43%
1990	228	−2.62%
1999	218	−0.50%
2007	227	+0.51%
2012	234	+0.61%
2017	201	−2.99%
2023	179	−1.91%
Source: INSEE

== See also ==
- Communes of the Aveyron department
