= Pomayrols =

Commune in Occitanie, France

- Commune
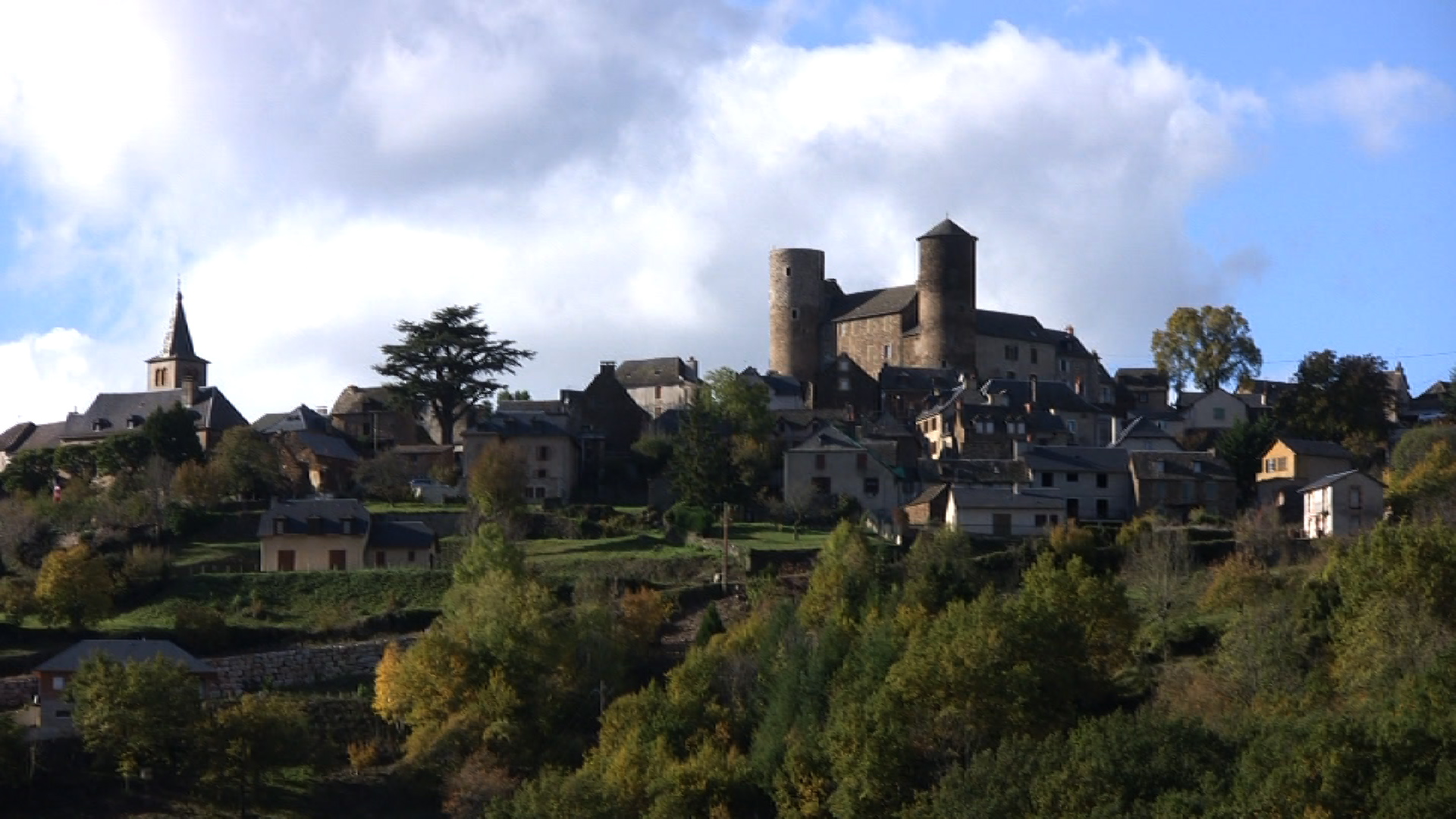
- Pomayrols and its castle

- Coat of arms
- Location of Pomayrols
- Location within France Location within Occitanie
- Coordinates: 44°28′19″N 3°01′32″E
- Country: France
- Region: Occitania
- Department: Aveyron
- Arrondissement: Rodez
- Canton: Lot et Palanges

Government
  - Mayor (2020–2026): Christine Andrieu Epouse Verlaguet
- Area^{1}: 23.1 km^{2} (8.9 sq mi)
- Elevation: 550 m (1,800 ft)
- Highest elevation: 1,180 m (3,870 ft)
- Lowest elevation: 433 m (1,421 ft)
- Population (2023): 116
  - Density: 5.02/km^{2} (13.0/sq mi)
- Time zone: UTC+01:00 (CET)
  - Summer (DST): UTC+02:00 (CEST)
- INSEE/Postal code: 12184 /12130
- ^{1} French Land Register data, which excludes lakes, ponds, glaciers > 1 km^{2} (0.386 sq mi or 247 acres) and river estuaries.

Pomayrols (French pronunciation: [pɔmeʁɔl]; Occitan: Pomairòls) is a commune in the Aveyron department in southern France.

== Geography ==
The commune lies on the southern slope of the high valley of the Lot river, between the cities of Saint-Laurent-d'Olt and Saint-Geniez-d'Olt.

Its land area is 2,340 hectares (in the shape of a triangle); its altitude varies from 433 metres in La Tourre with 1,180 metres at the "Puech of the Blackbird".

Its northeastern limit touches the department of Lozère with the commune of Trélans. It follows the old track "drailhe" which was used by the pilgrims of the Way of St. James and is now GR footpath n° 6 which connects Le Puy-en-Velay to Conques.

In southeast, from the ravine of the Drop to Puech Grond is used as limit with the commune of Saint-Laurent-d'Olt.

In the south, runs the Lot river which goes down from Saint-Laurent-d'Olt; it separates the commune with that from La Capelle-Bonance.

The river is used as border between two extremely different natural areas: mounts of Aubrac in north, large plateaus in the south.

In the southwest, the road on right bank of the brook of Bonance (known as "Canto Serp") borders the commune of Saint-Geniez-d'Olt.

In the northwest the commune is separated from that of Aurelle-Verlac by a line which passes under Ginestes, Molière and Fraïssinède.

== Localities and hamlets ==
Names of villages, farms and hamlets located on the territory of the commune in French and Occitan, with translation and origin.

- Pomayrols, (Pomairòls): place with the many apple trees, comes from Latin poma, pomum: apple.

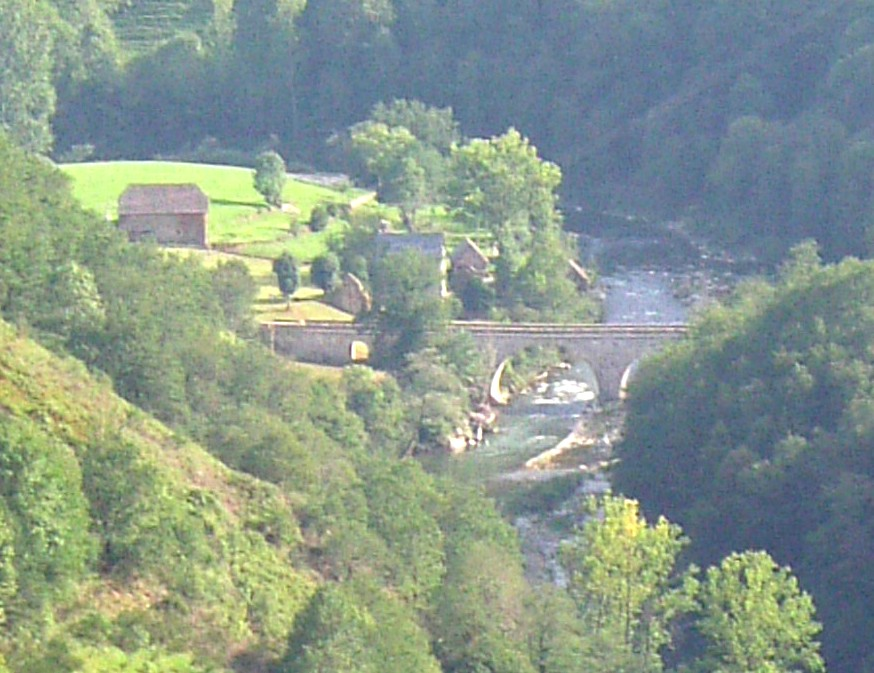
Chipole

- Chipole, (Gipola), "at Gipou" place which belongs to Joseph (Latin origin);
- La Tourre, Torre: the tower, in Latin turris: the tower.
- Vialaneuve, (the viala nova): the new way or new villa, from Latin via: the way.
- La Bessière, ( becièra ): planted place of birches, from Latin betullus: birch.

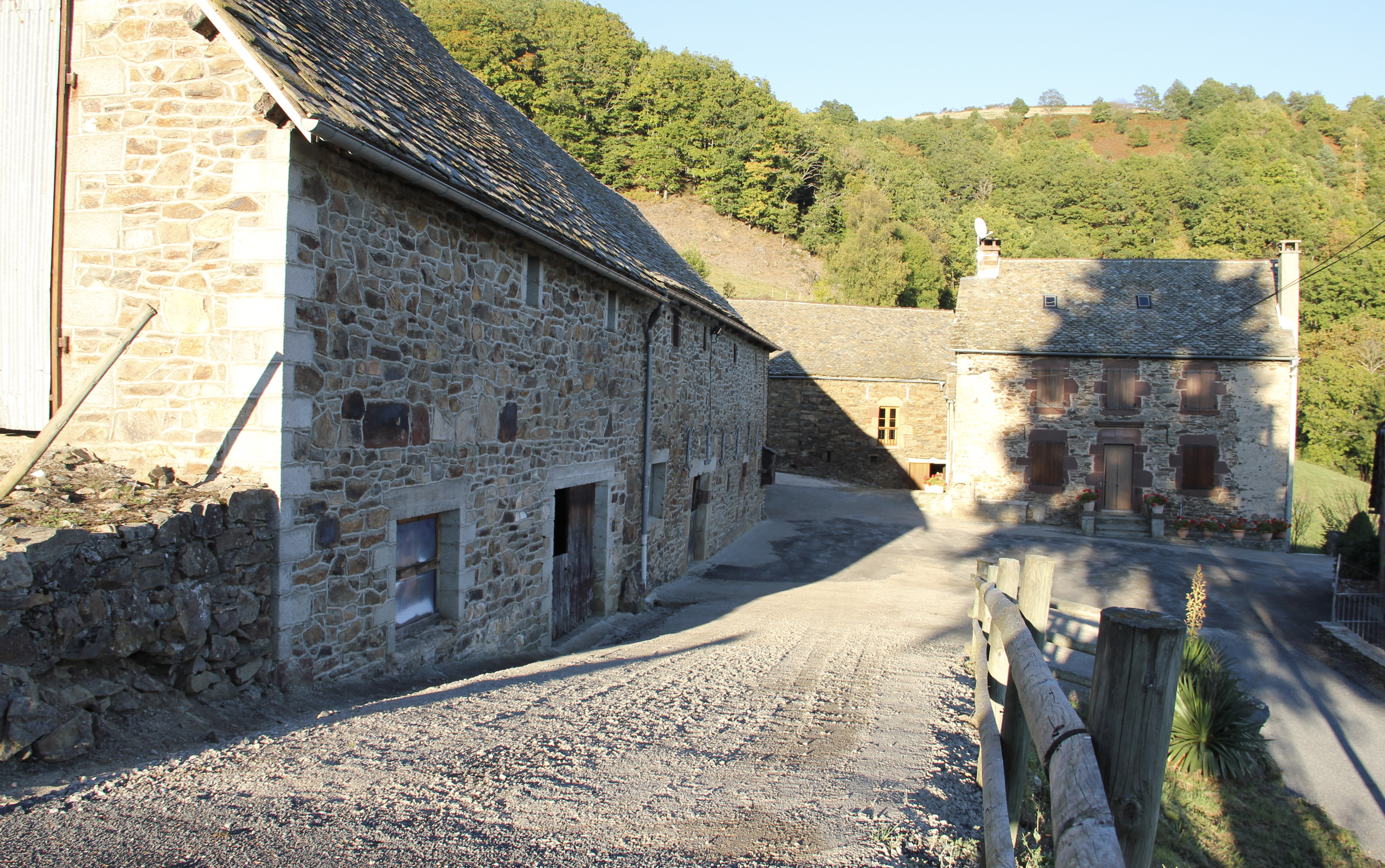
The farm: "Les Crouzets" Pomayrols-Aveyron-France

- Le Monna
- Les Gandalgues
- La Fage, ( the Fagia, in the past, the Clara Fagia): clearing of beeches, in Latin fagus/fagea: beech.
- Bonance
- Rouveret, (Roveret): plantation of oaks; place planted of reopen (oaks): from Latin robur: reopen.
- Les Vergounhoux, (los Vergonhôs): the vergogneux ones (humble and modest shy persons) in Latin vergonha: timidity.
- Lespinasse (the espinassa): where there are thorn-bushes, in Latin spina: spine.
- Le Flourigués (florigués): flowered place, in Latin flor: flower.
- La Boulesq, (the bolesc): place or house belonging to "Ball" (Latin origin).
- Falguières, (will falguièras): ferns, in Latin filicaria: fern.
- Les Crouzets, (los crosets): the small hollows, come from Celtic the kris, then in popular Latin crosus: hollow.
- Le Martinesq (lo Martinesc): place or house which belongs to Martin (Latin origin).
- La Plagne, (the planha): flat place, in Latin planea: plain.
- Les Pougettes
- La Bourgade, (the borgada): the village, comes from Germanic, burg: city.
- Les Gandalgues

The farms and hamlets located on left bank of the Lot river forming are added part of the parish of Pomayrols:

In the commune of Capelle-Bonance:

- La Prade
- Pomiès
- Navechs
- Le Gibertès
- Le Laus

In the commune of Saint-Geniez-in Olt:

- Cayzac (Caïsac): place pertaining to "Caïus" (Latin origin).

(Sources: Al Canton of Feels-Ginièis, departmental mission of the culture, ISBN 2-907279-07-6)

== Nature ==
=== Landscapes ===
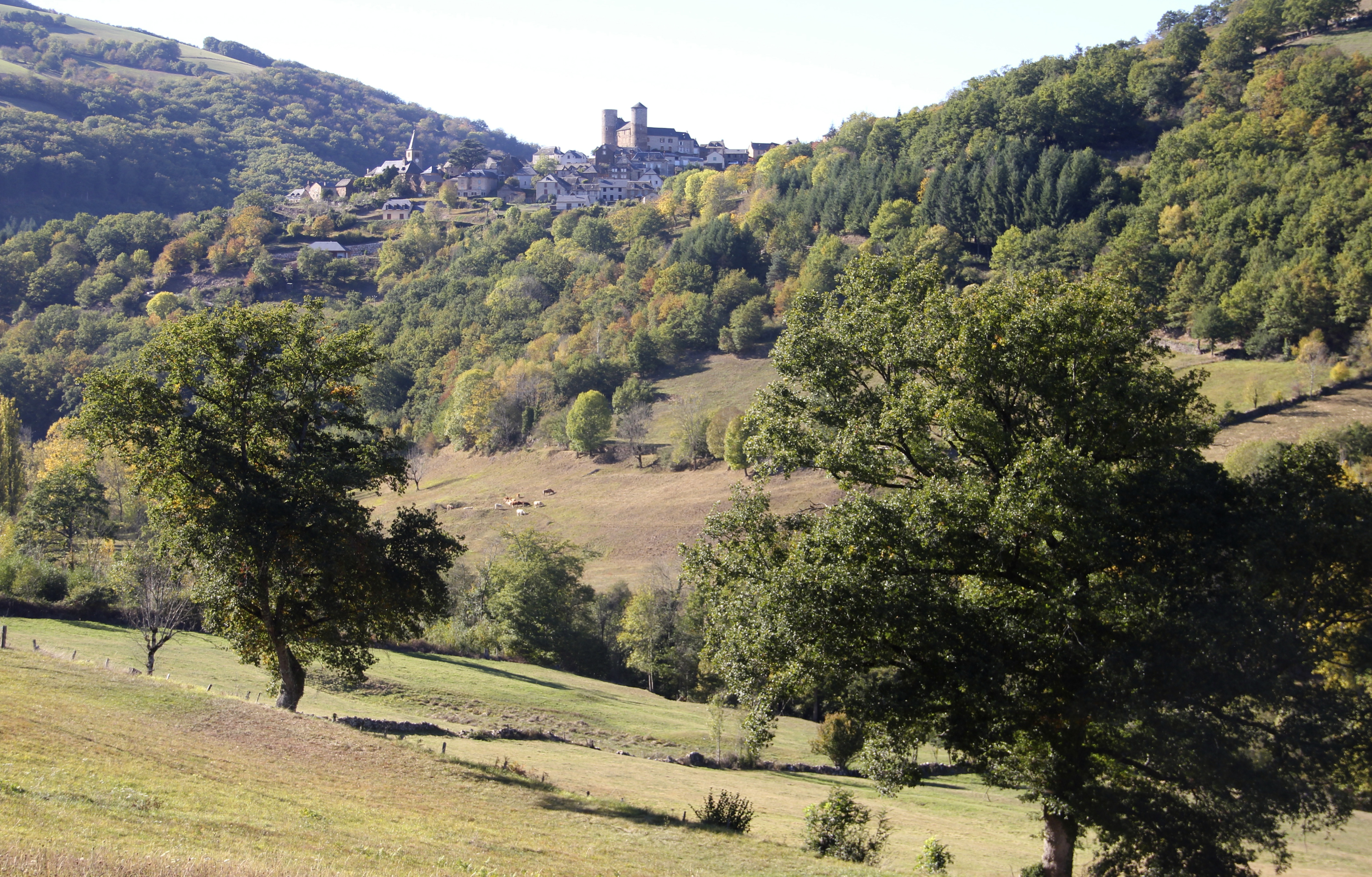
The valley of the Lot river. Pomayrols (Aveyron France)

The formerly cultivated slopes made place with the wood of oaks or chestnuts intersected with natural meadows.

On the heights, the moors of heathers were gradually replaced by vast meadows and fields of cereals.

On the commune, since the 1970s, the farmers forsook little by little the slopes with the profit heights easier to exploit.

If this change is not without incidences on the quality of surrounding spring waters, at the bottom of the valley on the other hand, this evolution allowed to see developing vast areas with the passing of years where nature took again its rights for the greatest benefit of the flora and fauna.

On along the river, this new situation does not make forget the maintenance of the banks in order to reduce the devastators effects of the risings.

=== Natura 2000 setting ===
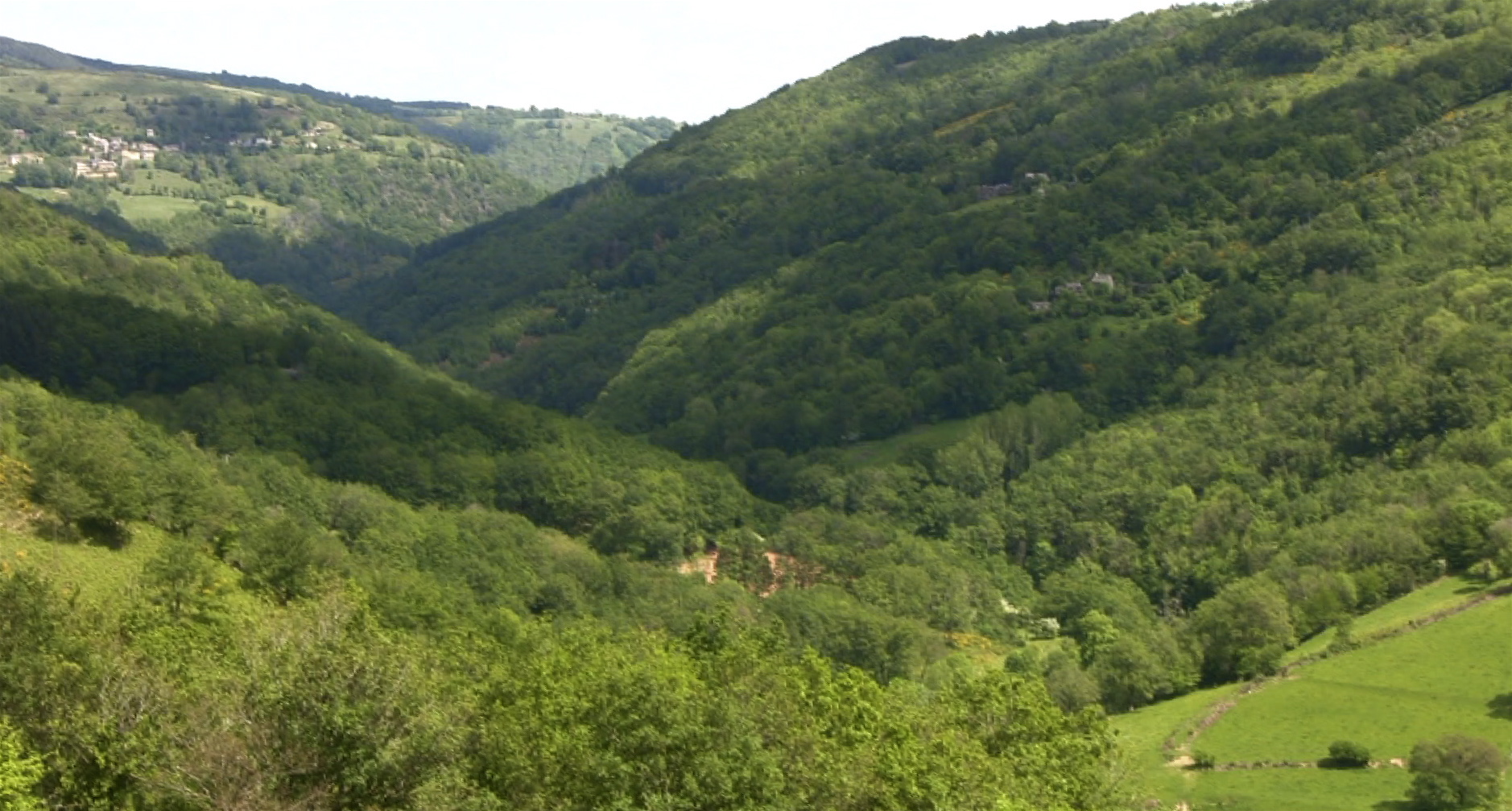
Natura 2000 area.

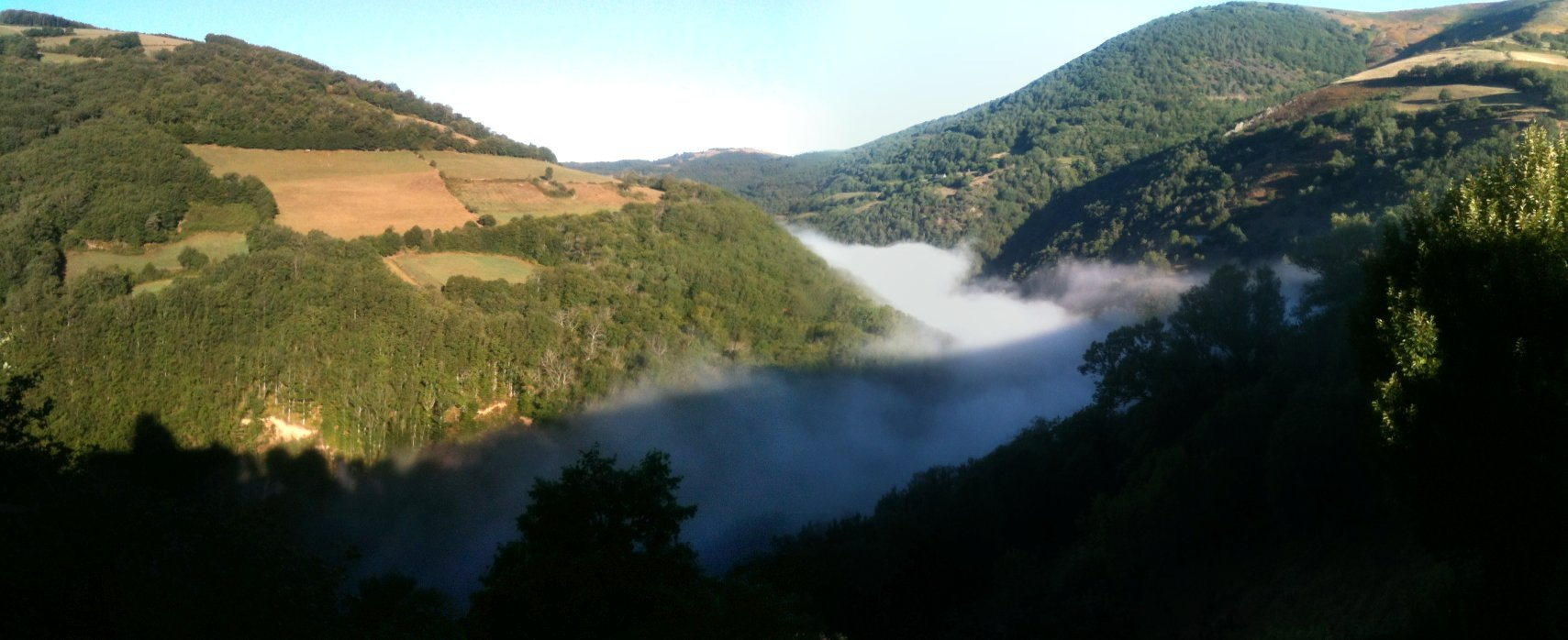
Mist in the valley.

To preserve biodiversity in the high valley of the Lot, the area between the cities of Espalion and Saint-Laurent-d'Olt was included in the Natura 2000 network.

In Pomayrols, on right bank of the river, the grounds located under the road n° 509 starting from the place known as:"Le Gravas" to the limit of Saint Laurent are indexed by the Général council of Aveyron as a sensitive natural area .

This part of the valley which extends on 8 km (5.0 mi) from banks makes from now on the object of specific contracts and procedures as regards agriculture in order to guarantee the protection of these mediums and to take care of the quietude of the animal species present.

== History ==
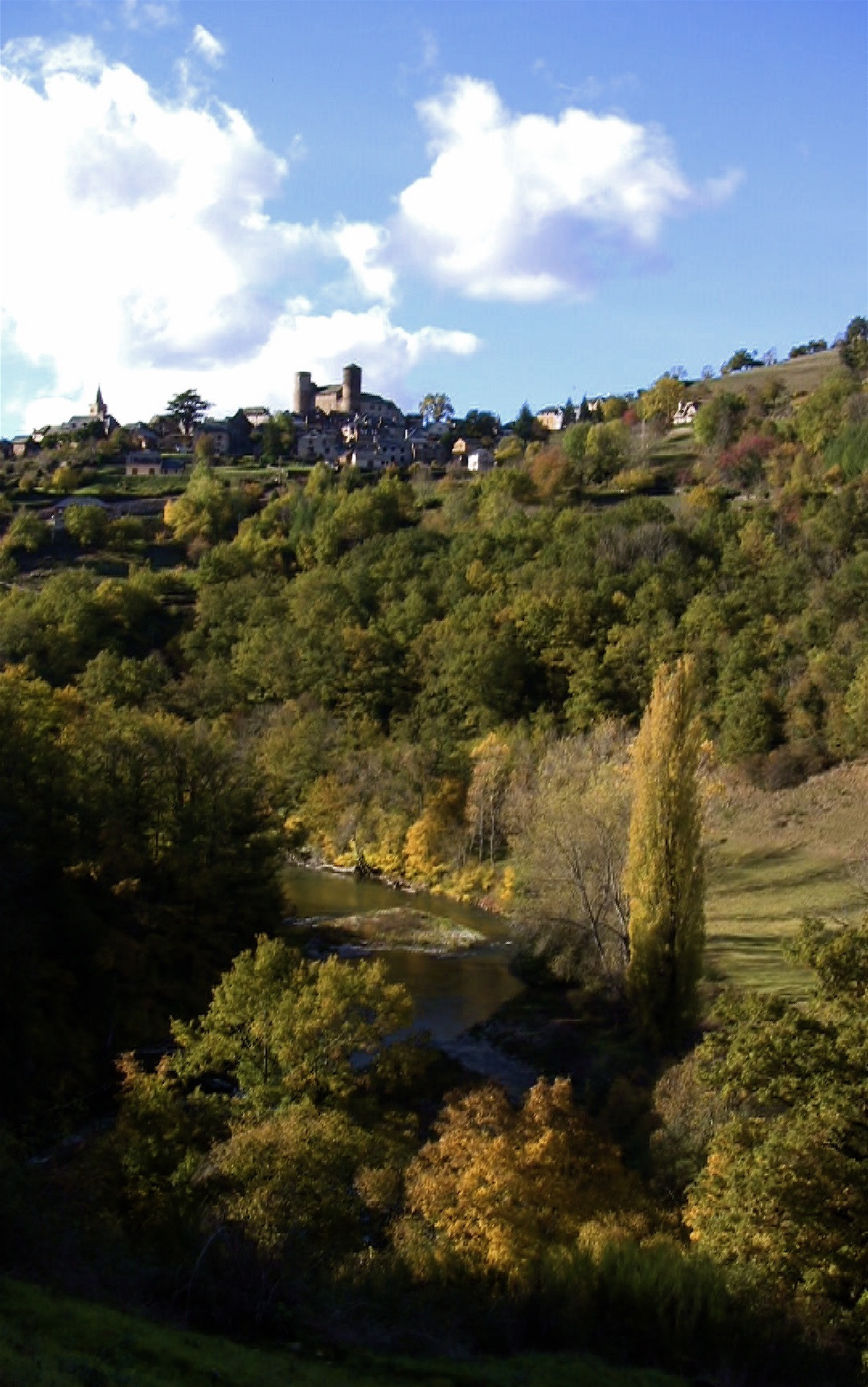
the castle overlooking the valley

Before the French Revolution, the castle and its land had successively belonged to several families of former Nobility.

Rights and duties of the lord of the manor of Pomayrols: The Lord of the manor had on his field (Manorialism) the duty to ensure peace and safety for the people. In order to maintain the peace, he had the legal authority, the right to make "the high, middle and low justice".

To show this capacity, he was allowed to draw up one or several Gibbet. (In French this right was called: right of fork). In Pomayrols, the gibbet was located at the cross of the stake (formerly a much attended crossing point). To ensure the safety of the goods and the people, he had to maintain men trained with the use of the weapons.

These expenses were financed by the perception of taxes and various royalties such as (Censive, Champart, Lods_&_sales and commun run of peace). Because of the scarcity of currency, these taxes were paid either in food products or in day's works ( Corvée). These local taxes resulting from Feudalism would be applied until 4 August 1789.

Cayrodes 1261–1408 In 1261, the seigniory belonged to the family of Cayrodes, Pons de Cayrodes (Étienne de Cayrodes'son) was the first of this line.

(the pact of marriage of Guillemette the Pons de Cayrodes' sister going back to 1261 is the oldest document which mentions the existence of the castle of Pomayrols.)

In 1360, by the Treaty of Brétigny, a great part of the South-west of France including Rouergue was annexed to Guyenne which was already an English possession since 1259.

Pomayrols from now on was located at the border with close Gévaudan remained with the crown of France. The Black Prince troops set up a regular monitoring of this new border.

Between 1361 and 1369, an English garrison occupied the châtellenie of La Roque Valzergues close to Saint Saturnin de Lenne.

(Witness of this disturbed time, the rock of the English, " Lo ròc dels Anglés" in occitan language.

This large rock drawn up on the Southern slope of the small valley of the Cazette holds its name for the time when these soldiers who moved in hostile environment, used it as place of sheltered and made safe bivouac).

In 1408, Hugues de Cayrodes tested the field in favour of the marquis de Laromiguière a close relation of his family.

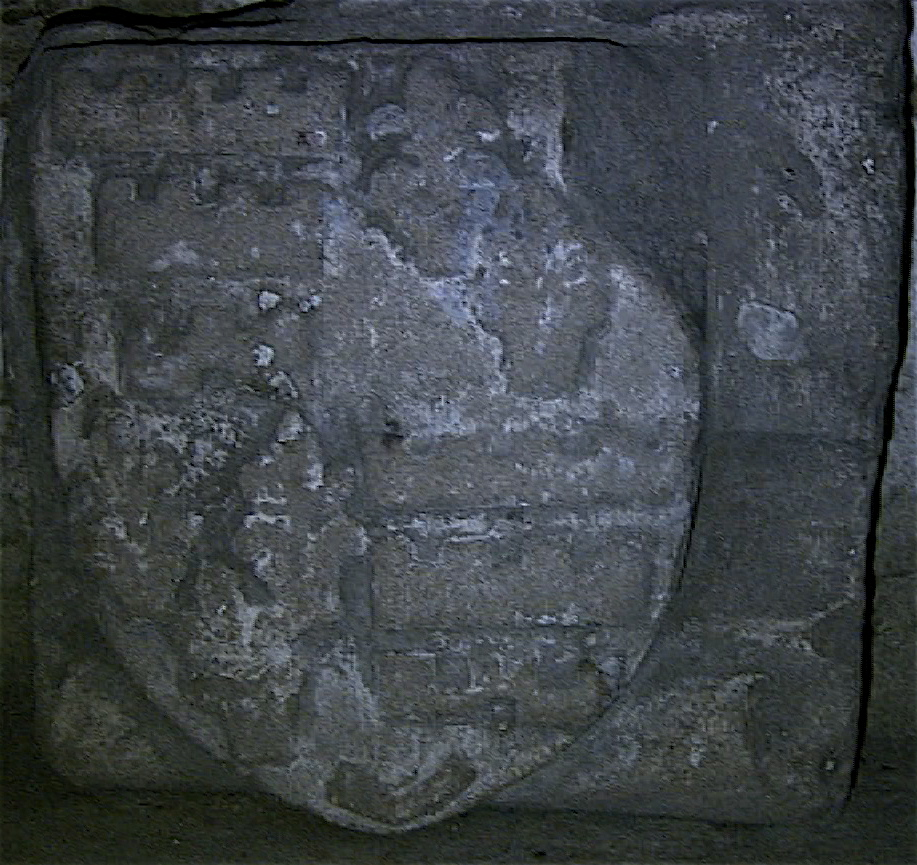
Armorial bearings of Laromiguière

Laromiguiere 1408–1452 In 1425, always during the Hundred Years' War, at the beginning of the reign of the king Charles VII of France, Loîse (Louise) of Laromiguière married Aymeric de Montamail which taken the name and armorial bearings of Laromiguière.

In 1452, Gabrielle their daughter, married Bérard Murat de Lestang which engaged for him and its, to keep the armorial bearings of Laromiguière.

Murat de Lestang 1452–1687 Among the lords of Rouergue, the family Murat de Lestang was during the 15th and 16th century, one of the most powerful of the county.

The Pomayrols line:

Gabrielle de Laromiguière: heiress of Pomayrols, Cambon, La roque Sainte Marguerite, and Bozouls in Rouergue as well as Montamat close to Raulhac in Auvergne.

Bérard Murat de Lestang: Rider and chamberlain of the king Louis XI of France.

He was named by the king with the command of the military forterress of Usson in Auvergne.

Gabrielle and Bérard (Bernard) had three children, Antoine, Pierre and Gabriel.

Gabriel Murat de Lestang: Knight Hospitaller of saint John of Jerusalem, that the History indicates under the name of Commander of Pomayrols.

He illustrated itself, with his friends in arms by its bravery at the time of the defense of the fortress of Rhodes besieged by Suleiman the Magnificent in 1522, under the reign of Francis I of France. Of return in France it managed the commandery of Saint Jean of Toulouse.

Antoine Murat de Lestang: Rider of the king Charles VIII of France. Married in 1504, with Marquise, the daughter of Guillaume, Baron of Estaing, without children, he bequeathed Pomayrols to Pierre his brother.

Pierre Murat de Lestang: Married during the alive one of Antoine with Marie, heiress of the castle of Labastide - Teulat, they bequeathed Pomayrols to François their son.

François Murat de Lestang: Married in 1541, with Anne, the daughter of Antoine, Lord of Valzergues and Naussac, they bequeathed Pomayrols to Antoine their son.

It was at that time, on 15 February 1568, during the French Wars of Religion, under the reign of the king Charles IX of France, that the castle and the church of the village were plundered and ransacked.

Huguenot revolts, come from Millau, sowed terror through Rouergue.

They were caught of it more particularly to the members clergy and with the goods of the catholic Church. Learning that in the castle of Pomayrols, had been stored harvests but especially of the pieces of furniture and the objects of great values of the churches of Saint-Geniez, they went there to take it by storm, in spite of the walls, the attackers in excess did not have any difficulties of taking the " local Fort Knox".

The castle was plundered and set fire to. The six priests who had the guard of the parochial goods were carried out by the sword.

In same time, learning that moniales were with the monastery of Fage, the plunderers went up there at once.

Alerted this threat, the moniales fled towards Saint-Geniez by the valley, they were refugièrent in the hermitage of Saint-Pierre (near to the current vault of the boxwood).

They would remain there until 17 May 1586, when Saint Geniez d' Olt was again attacked by the troops of the Protestant Reformation, the churches were plundered and set fire to, the hermitage of Saint Pierre located near to the borough suffered the same fate, unhappy young women whom the History will retain under the name of Ladies of Pomayrols, all were massacred.

Antoine Murat de Lestang 2nd of the name: Married on 18 June 1581, Jeanne, the only daughter of Antoine de Bérail the Lord of Paulhac, Caylus, Belpech and other places. Antoine dies "of violent death" on 26 September 1613. (He will be the last Lord to have resided permanently at the castle). He bequeathed Pomayrols to Claude his son.

Claude Murat de Lestang: Gentleman with the room of the king Louis XIII. It married on 14 November 1615, Gabrielle, the daughter of Jean, Sénéchal and Governor of Toulouse, Lord of Valette and other places. They gave birth to three children: Jean, Marie and François. They Bequeathed Pomayrols to Jean.

Jean Murat de Lestang: Married on 20 March 1664, Anne-Marthe, the daughter of Louis, Lord of Brunet, Vicomte of Ambialet, Panat and other places. They had three children: François, Anne and Marie. They bequeathed Pomayrols to François their elder son.

François Murat de Lestang: Without children, it bequeathed Pomayrols to Anne her sister.

Armorial bearings of Dupont de Ligonnes.

On 5 October 1687 Anne Murat de Lestang married Jean Baptist Deroux de la Loubière, thus was completed the line of Murat de Lestang with Pomayrols.

Deroux de la Loubiere 1687 - 1754 In 1754, Jean Baptist DeRoux (2nd of the name) tested the field of Pomayrols in favour of his nephew Jean Baptist Dupont de Ligonnes

Dupont of Ligonnes 1754 - 1789 After the year 1800, Charles Gabriel Dupont de Ligonnès, his son, sold the castle (which for lack of maintenance was in state of advanced decay) to Mr. Aymar de Jabrun.

Sources: The gold Book of Pomayrols, Maury printer S.A, 4E quarter 1982.

History of Rouergue, Editions Privat 1987, ISBN 2-7089-1689-0

== Administration ==
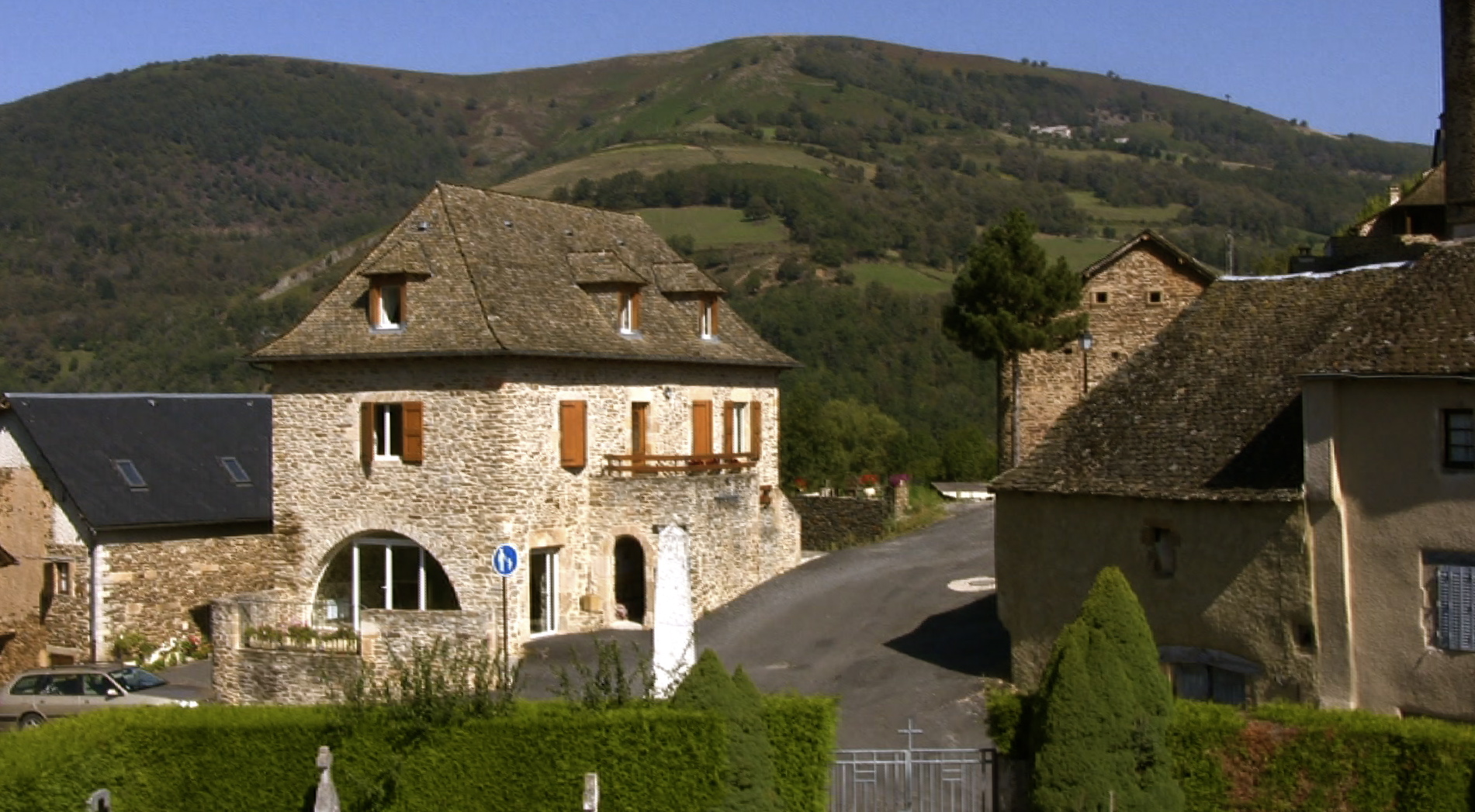
Town hall

Successive mayors since 1900

List of successive mayors
Term	Name
1900–1904	Numa Autigeon
1904–1938	Joseph Bouscary
1938–1959	Baptiste Badoc
1959–1967	Joseph Tisse
1967–1983	Jean Sabarie
1983–2008	André Solignac
2008–2014	Bernard Solignac
2014–2020	Christine Verlaguet
2020–incumbent	Christine Andrieu Epouse Verlaguet

== Population ==
Demography under the Ancien Régime:

Since the 14th century, the bishops of Rodez are held to make at least once during their mandate, the round of inspection of each parish.

About 1515, the parish of Pomayrols (which included La Boulesq and Falguières) counted 1200 inhabitants including 400 in the borough.

During the 18th century, under the reign of King Louis XV, the result of the inspections of 1746 and 1771 teach us that the population which lived in Pomayrols turned around a thousand of inhabitants (900 in 1746, 1090 in 1771, including 341 in the borough).

Demography during 19th and 20th centuries:

In 1874 the commune counted 1107 inhabitants. 479 on the parish of Pomayrols, 378 around Boulesq and Falguières, 250 around Fage.

From the 16th until at the end of the 19th century, the population of the valley thus remained relatively stable.

Marriage certificates on the commune and parish of Pomayrols to the 19th century.

According to the data base of the F.N.A.A

Since the end of the 19th century, the migrations (towards Paris or others towns and South America too) noted on the whole of Massif central area did not save the commune.

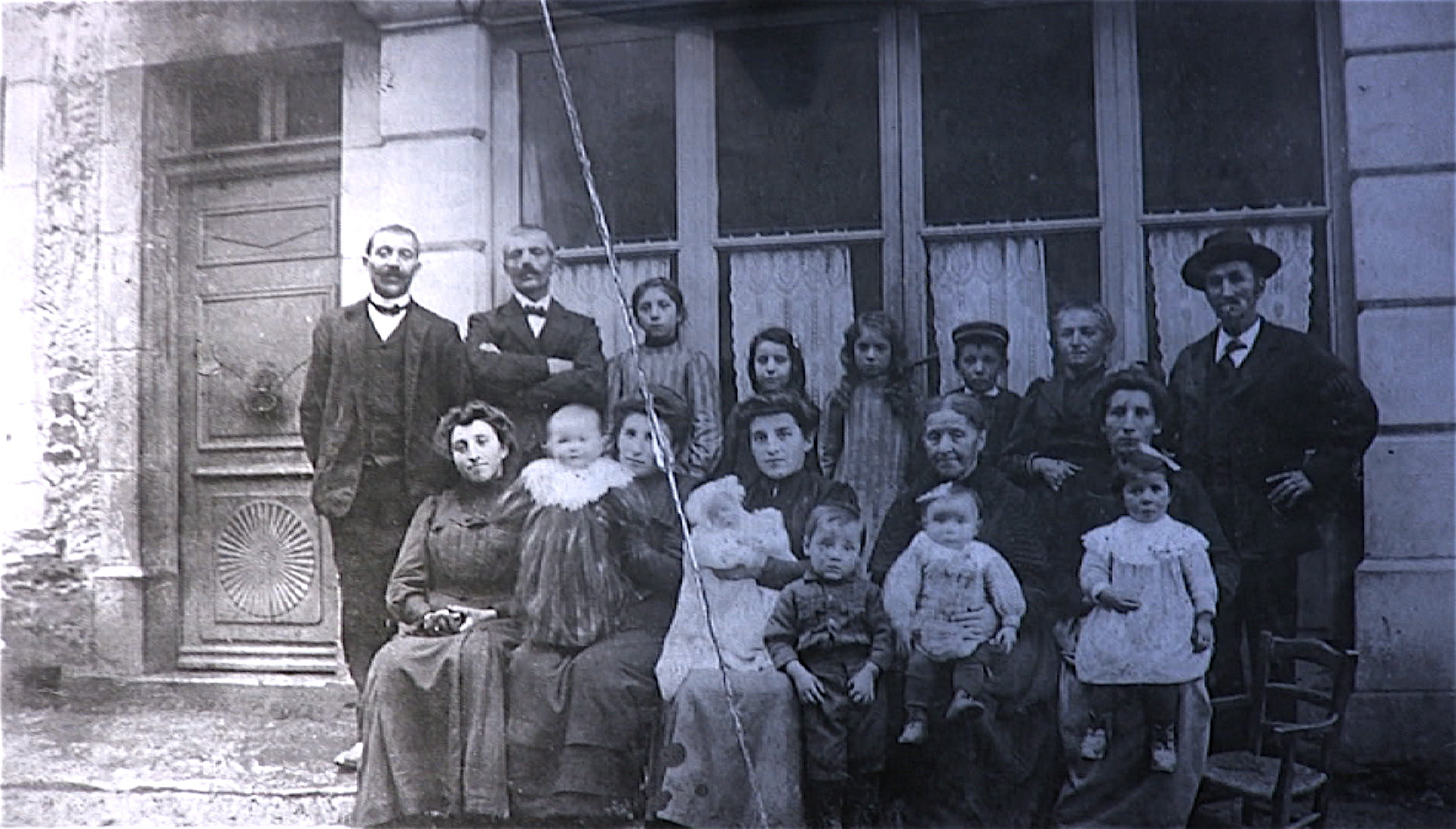
Baptism in 1913.

In 1914, it counted only 600 inhabitants. Between 1914 and 1918, the First World War left 61 victims among the men in age to found a family, accentuating the depopulation.

Historical population

Year	Pop.	±% p.a.
1515	1,200	—
1746	900	−0.12%
1771	1,090	+0.77%
1793	533	−3.20%
1806	3,679	+16.02%
1841	1,869	−1.92%
1872	913	−2.28%
1911	601	−1.07%
1931	512	−0.80%
1946	387	−1.85%
1954	342	−1.53%

Year	Pop.	±% p.a.
1962	276	−2.64%
1968	283	+0.42%
1975	246	−1.98%
1982	178	−4.52%
1990	182	+0.28%
1999	152	−1.98%
2007	153	+0.08%
2012	132	−2.91%
2017	119	−2.05%
2023	116	−0.42%

Source: EHESS (1793-1999) and INSEE (1968-2023)

Nowadays, the commune is characterized by the doubling of its population in the summer.

According to INSEE, in 2017, the commune counted 145 dwellings, of which 41% were main residences, 57% were second homes and 1% were vacant.

== Religious heritage ==
=== John the Baptist church ===
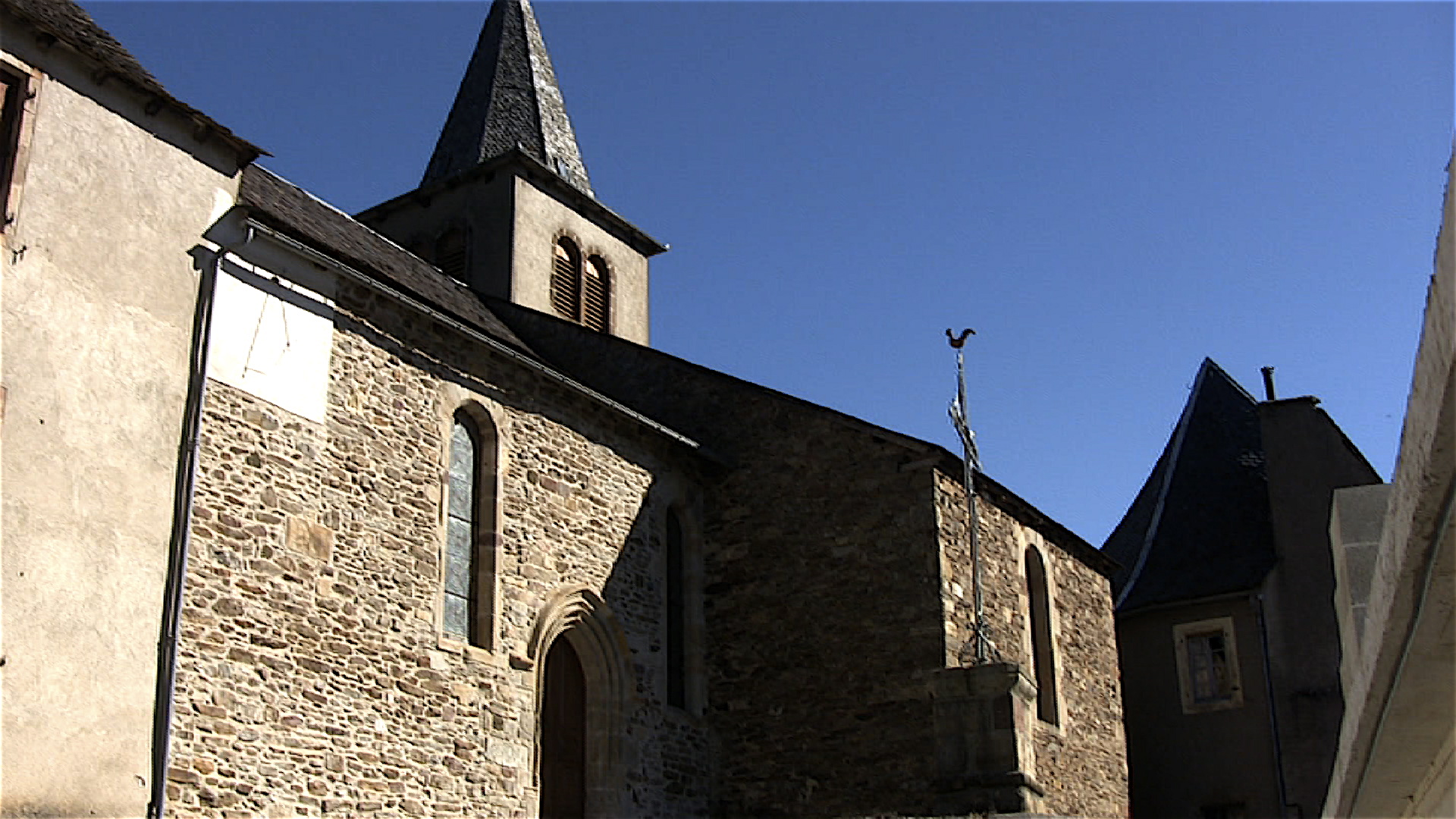
John the Baptist Church.

The church is located at the bottom of the village, with the arrival of the path which used to be called "the coast of the Lords".

The building existed from the very start of the 11th century.

In 1050, under the reign of Henry I of France, Hugues de Calmont, bequeathed it to the abbey of Conques which would manage it for more than three centuries. The village was used as stage for the pélerins of the Way of St. James, which went from Puy in Velay to Conques.

On 28 February 1390 the abbey of Conques yielded the administration of the church and its Priory to the diocese of Rodez. In 1452 Bérard Murat de Lestang undertook its rebuilding.

(the side chapel of the rosary where it puts back beside Gabrielle his wife is the only part of the church who remains us of this time).

Partly burned in 1568 during the wars of religion, the church was raised returned peace. Three centuries later, between 1840 and 1900, the church was gradually restored: the vault in 1840, interior parts in 1852, the bell-tower in 1855.

=== The Saint Peter cross ===
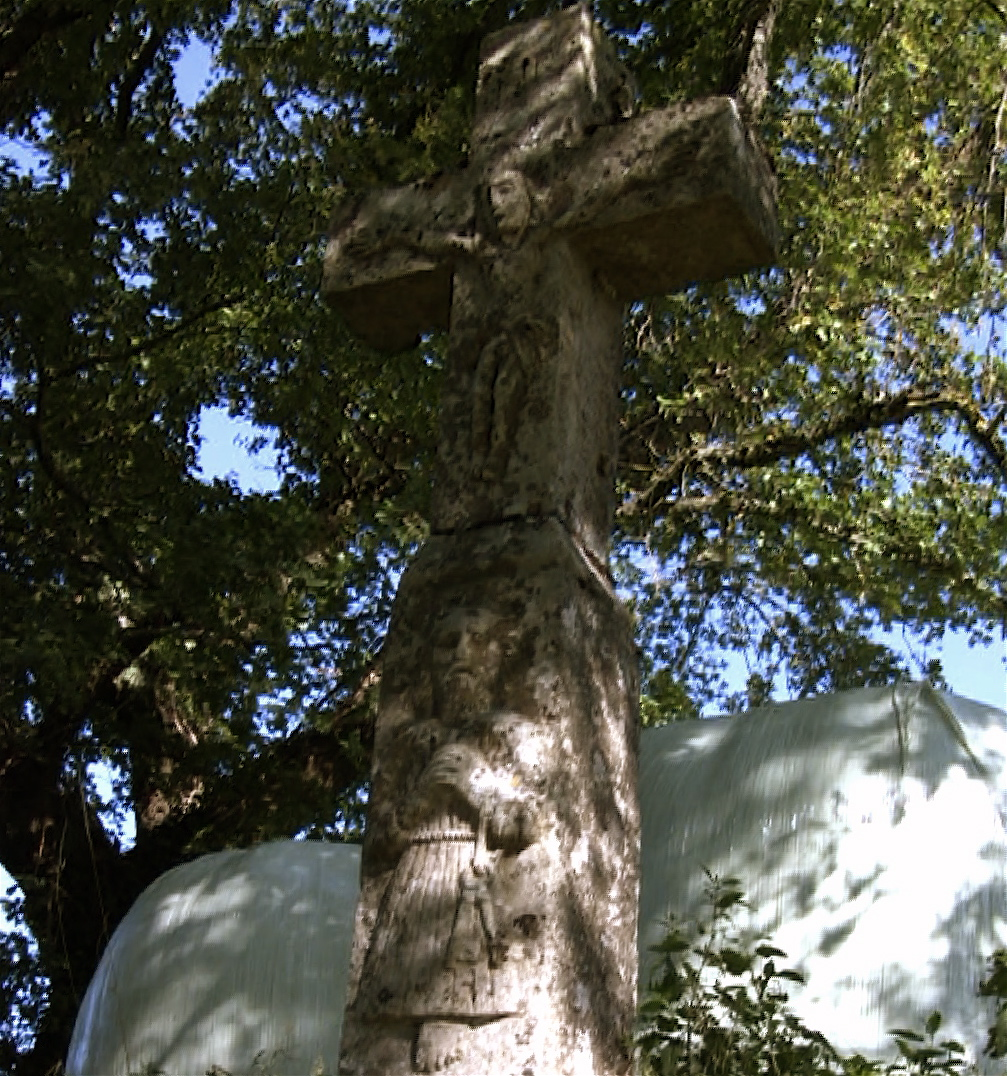
The Saint Peter cross.

(Located near to the borough of Pomayrols at the turning of the lane which leads to Bonance).

It is a very beautiful cross cut out of limestone where figure in low relief Peter the apostle and on which one you can read the following inscription: " FEV Marie Veisset de Bonance founder of this cross. A lord' s Prayer and a Maria ave. Requiescant in pace. Amen." Pierre Flovrou that it did it the year 1740.

Opposite the current cross, there was a small vault also dedicated to Saint Peter who had been built in 1544 per Pierre Murat de Lestang.

=== The chapel of the calvary ===
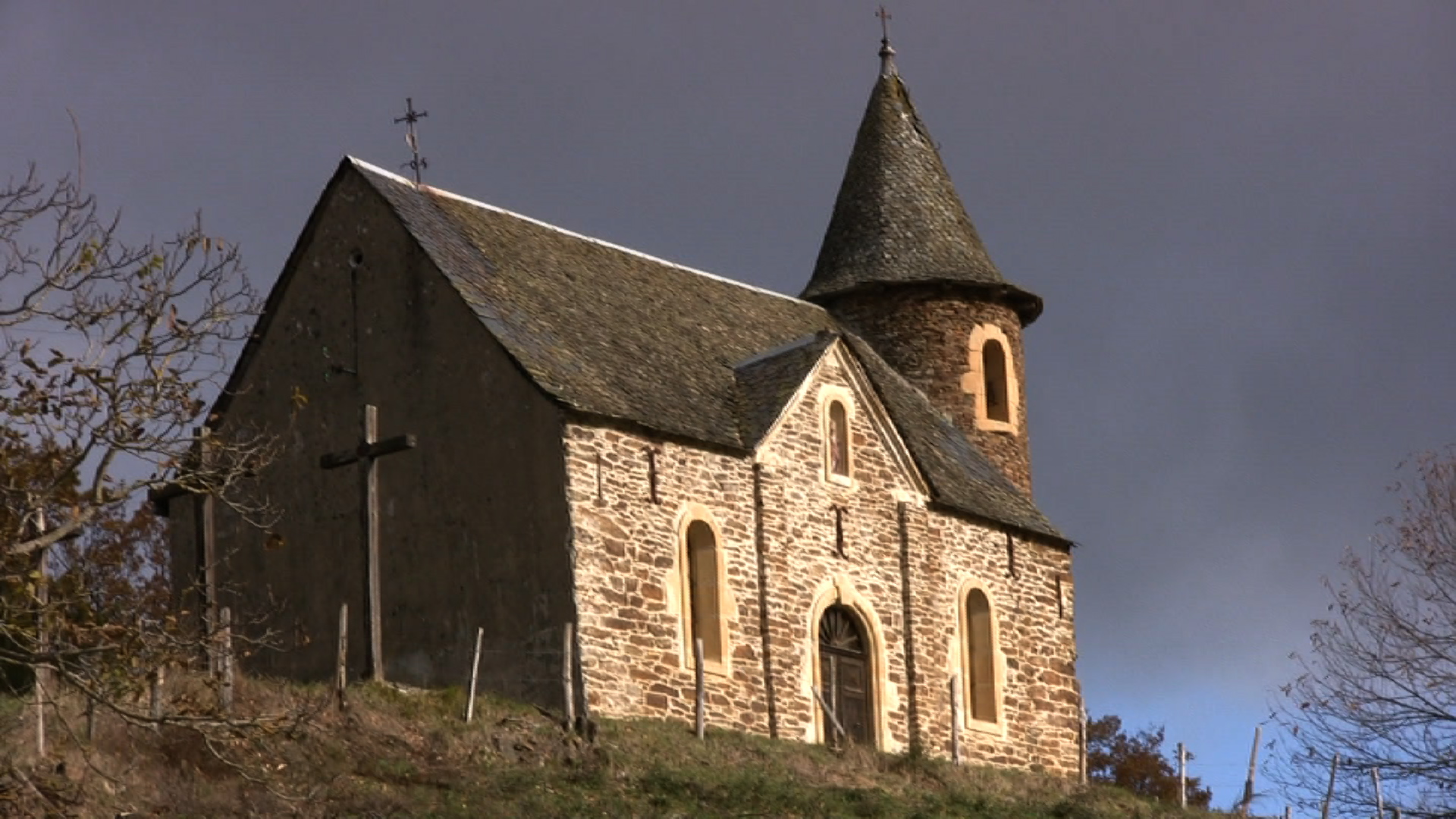
The calvary

Its frontage cuts out on the peak of the hill to a few hundred meters of the borough of Pomayrols.

It was built in 1788 by the Marie and Christine Massabuau. In ruin one century afterwards, it was raised in 1880 by the inhabitants of the village (owners of the building) In 1988, at the time of its bicentenary, it was restored on the initiative of the Parisians friendly society.

=== Mary Magdalene Church ===
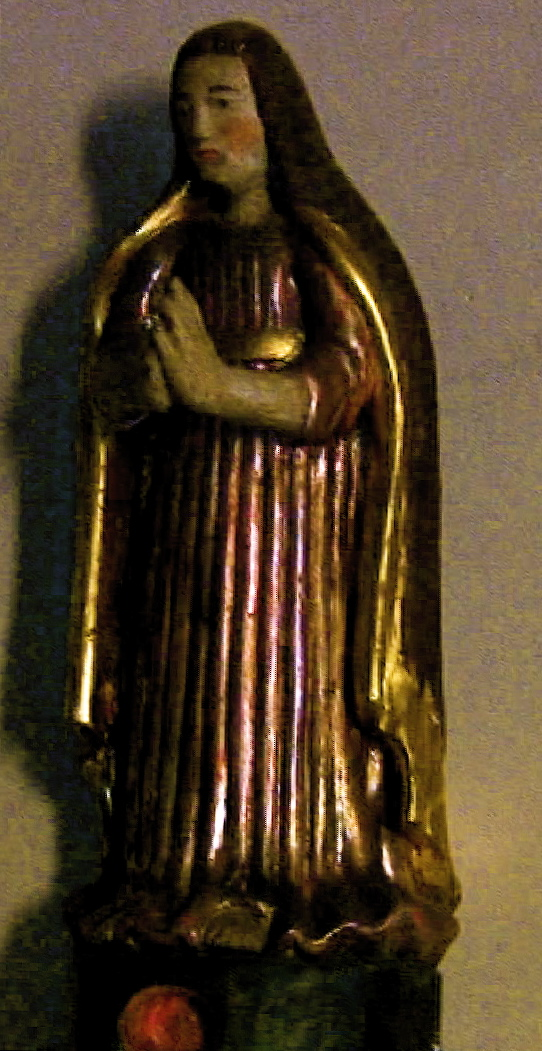
Mary Magdalene wood statuette

Located near to the hamlet of La Fage, sheltered with the hollow of a small valley, the church existed since the 10th century.

In 1082, it was given by Pons of Etienne (bishop of Rodez between 1079 and 1095) to the abbey Saint Victor of Marseilles .

In 1144, the pope Lucius II confirmed this donation.

About 1550, the two daughters of Pierre Murat de Lestang lord of Pomayrols founded a monastery there. In 1568, during the wars of religion, the buildings were partly destroyed.

In 1700 the church was set up in parish. The priests resident will follow one another it to the 20th century (1931).

During the 19th century, work of restoration was undertaken by the fabric committee and the parishioners to preserve the building of the bad weather.

In 1879, a part of the church was repaired as well as the presbytery.

In 1892, the rough-casting of the walls.

The side Romance vault constitutes the only vestiges which remain us of preceding building.

=== Saint Roch Church in La-Boulesq ===
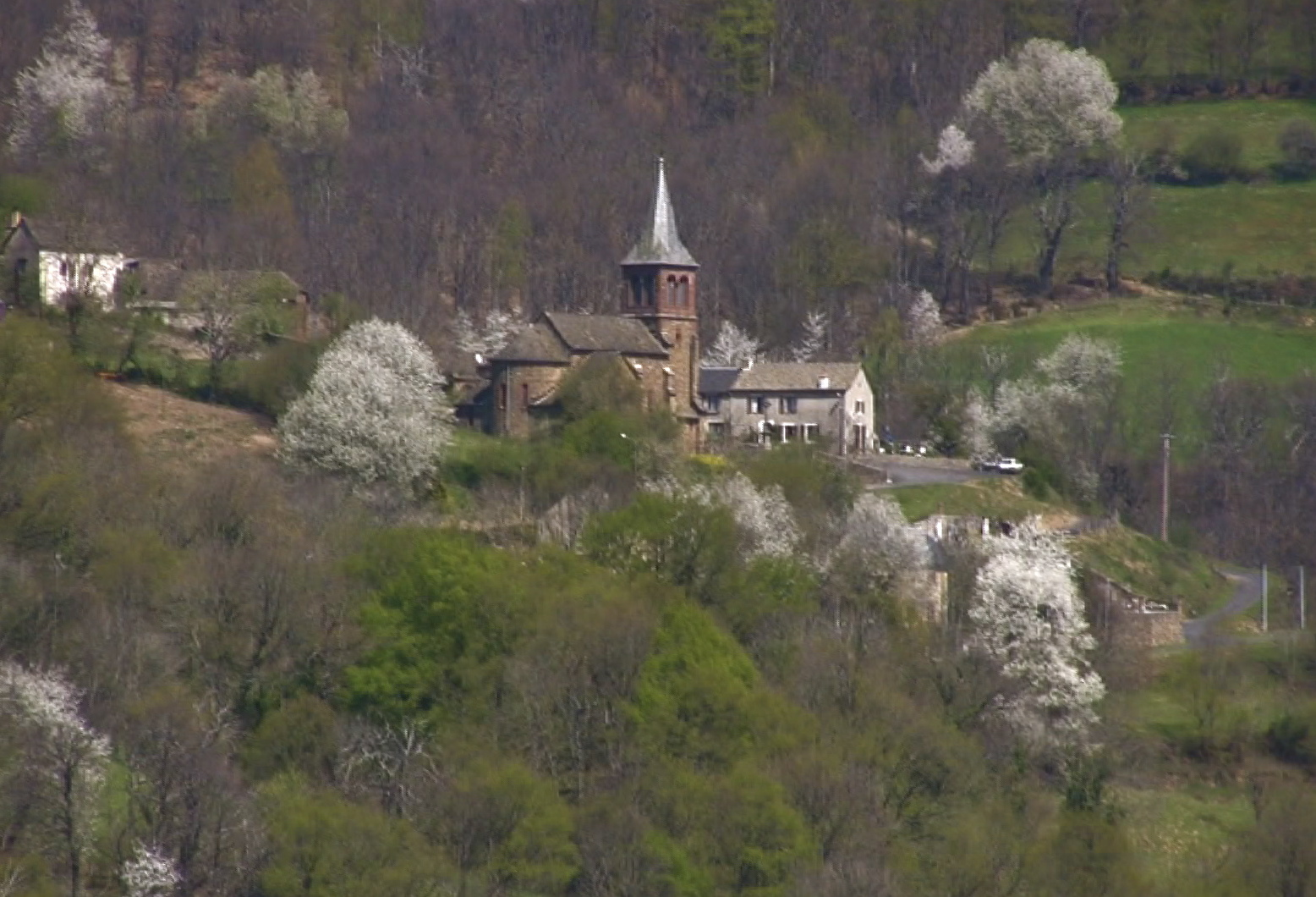
Saint Roch church in La Boulesq

Located on the Southern slope of the valley, in the medium of the charming village of Boulesq, the church whose bell-tower is built out of pink sandstone of Saint Laurent d'olt date of 1893.

It was built since 1890 by the inhabitants of the village.

Previously, at the place of the current presbytery, there was a small vault also dedicated to Saint Roch who went back to 1777.

This vault was set up in parish on 26 April 1787 by the bishop of Rodez of the time: Jerome-Marie Champion of Cicé.

=== The cross with the wheel in Falguières ===
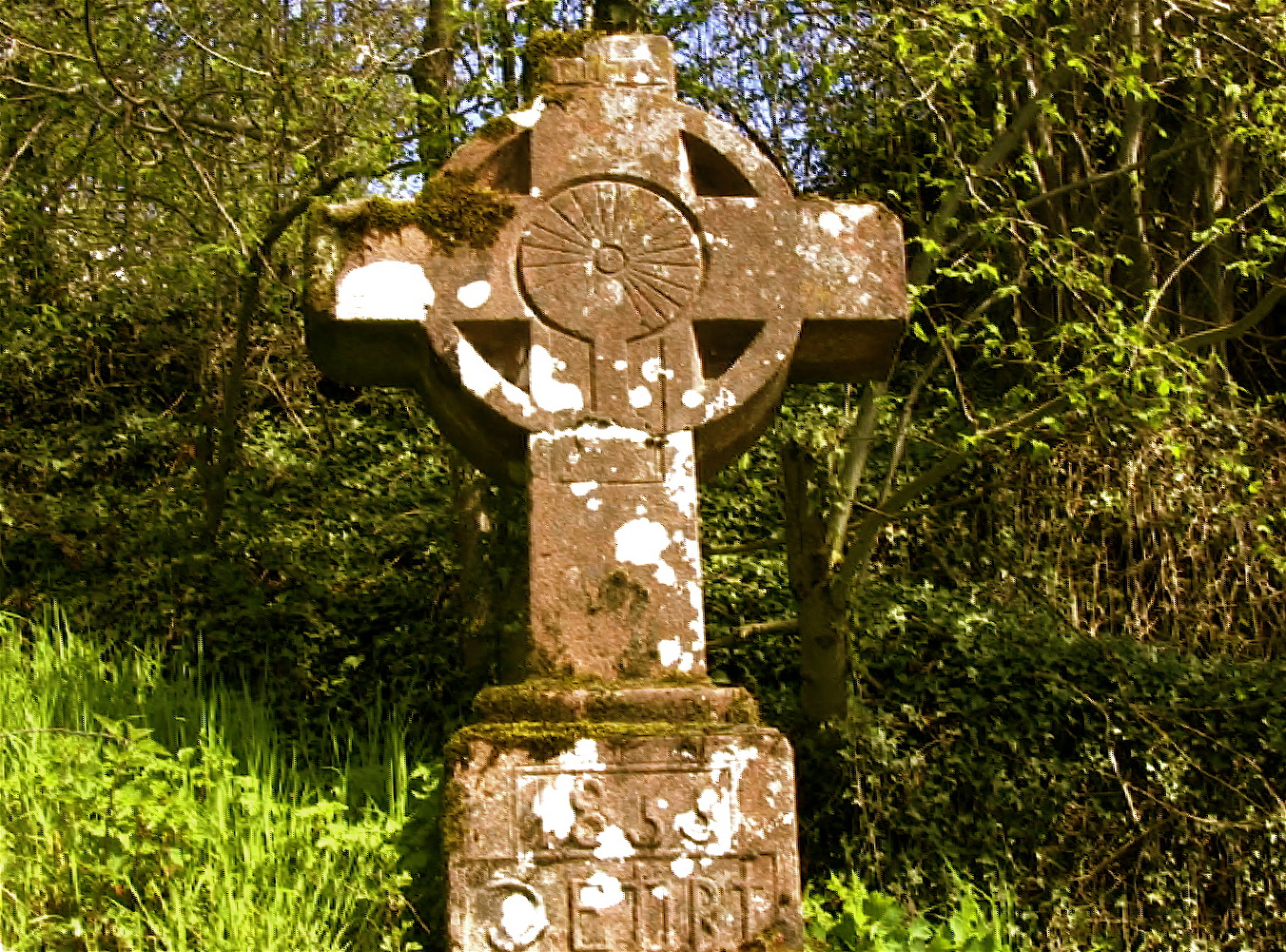
The cross with the wheel in Falguières

Located in top of the village, this beautiful pink sandstone cross overhanging a fountain is finely worked.

It carries the date of 1856 and the inscriptions: E J.B., the initials of Enfru Jean Baptist, who was a stonemason.

== Civil heritage ==
=== The castle ===
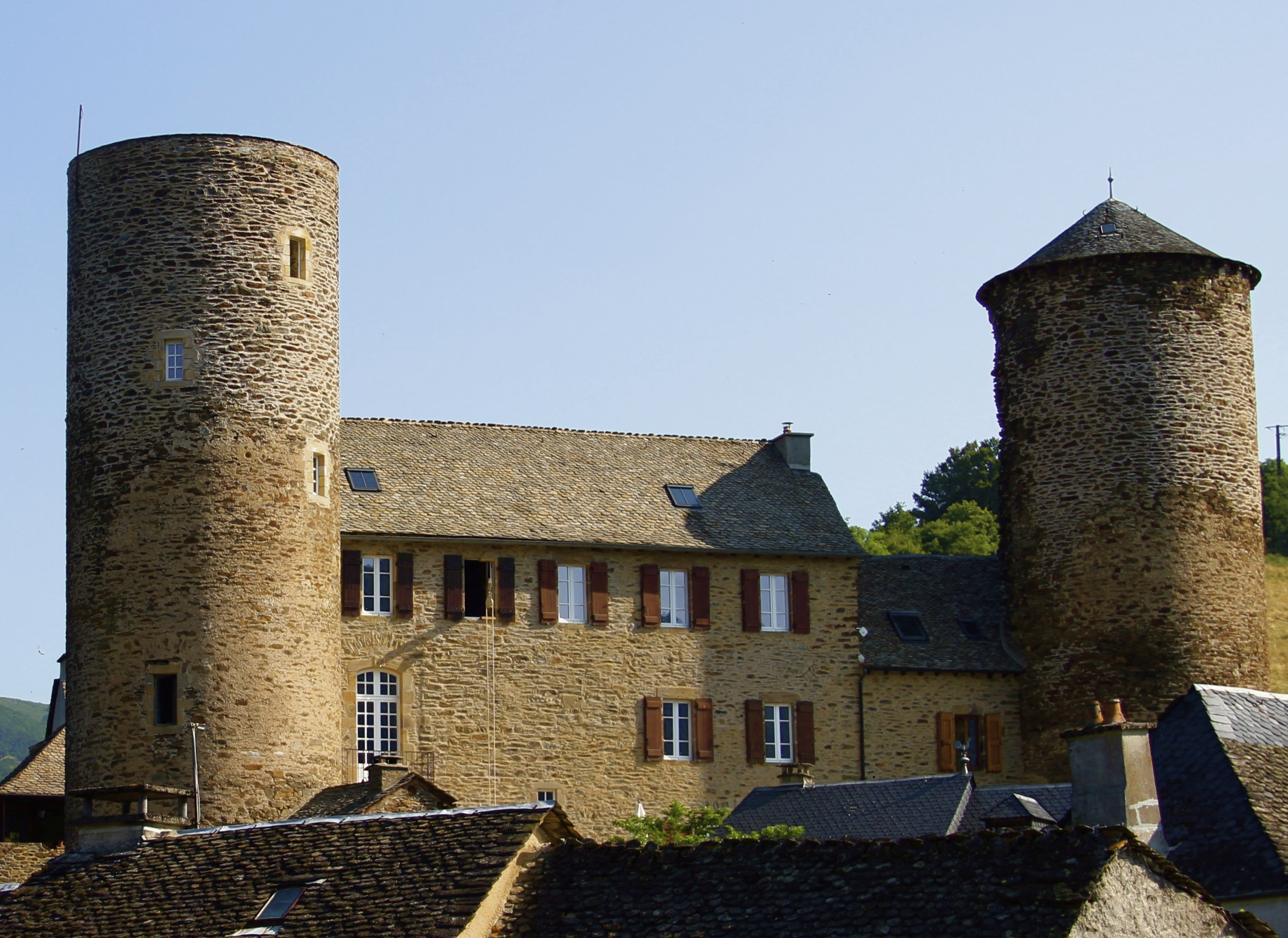
The castle (southern frontage).

The presence of the castle would go up to the 10th century, period during which many fortifications were built.

Its existence is attested since 1261 in the marriage certificate of Guillemette the Pons de Cayrodes' sister.

The current castle, at least what us remains about it, was completed in 1446.

It results from rehandlings and enlargings carried out on the castle of origin.

In this end of the Middle Ages, the memory of made plunderings a few decades before by the Great Company was always present in the spirits and justified this construction for the protection of the goods and the people.

Here is an old description:

This building forms a quadrilateral oblong and flanked on the southernmost frontage of two grosses 28-metre-high (92 ft) towers (not included crenels).

They have with their external base, ten nine meters of circumference. In the towers are "apartments": four in the East and six in the West.

The thickness of the walls is 1 meter. The frontage of the South east bored of 15 windows. The walls as well as the towers are crenelated. Ditches made the turn of the castle. In front of the gate are the superimposed stables whose Western frontage has five arcades with semicircular arch and loopholes, resting on large cylindrical columns half.

The castle is built out of schist drowned in the mortar watered with the large sand of Lot river.

This mortar is very hard, because it is easier to cross than to tear off the stone.

The corners of the doors and the windows are in likings variegated, taken with the careers of Capelle Bonance.

In 1329, to facilitate transport of it, the lord of Pomayrols had made build a bridge upon the Lot river which was carried by a rising in 1705.

The building of 1446 will preserve its aspect of origin until 1568. After the passage of Huguenots, the ransacked parts all were not rebuilt.

Murat de Lestang which had functions at the court of Versailles will not remain any more with the castle.

It is a building without maintenance, delivered to the bad weather and the plunderers which is bought during the French revolution by Mr. Aymar de Jabrun.

During the 19th century, Aymar de Jabrun sells the masonry to Mr. Xavier Fournier (craftsman on wood) who will rebuild the parts in ruin.

In the Southern building, it will arrange there workshops at the ground floor and apartments in the stages.

In 1905 it sells with the commune the part located at the East and the contiguous tower. It will arrange there a public school at the ground floor, the residences of the teachers to the 1er stages. In the tower: the town hall.

In 1986, this part was entirely renovated and reconverted in rooms of reception and residences of hiring. A part of angle shelters a museum where a remarkable collection of old agricultural tools is exposed.

Despite past damage and modifications, the castle and its two prominent towers remain a key historical site in High Rouergue, although it lacks formal historic monument status.

=== The Chipole bridge ===
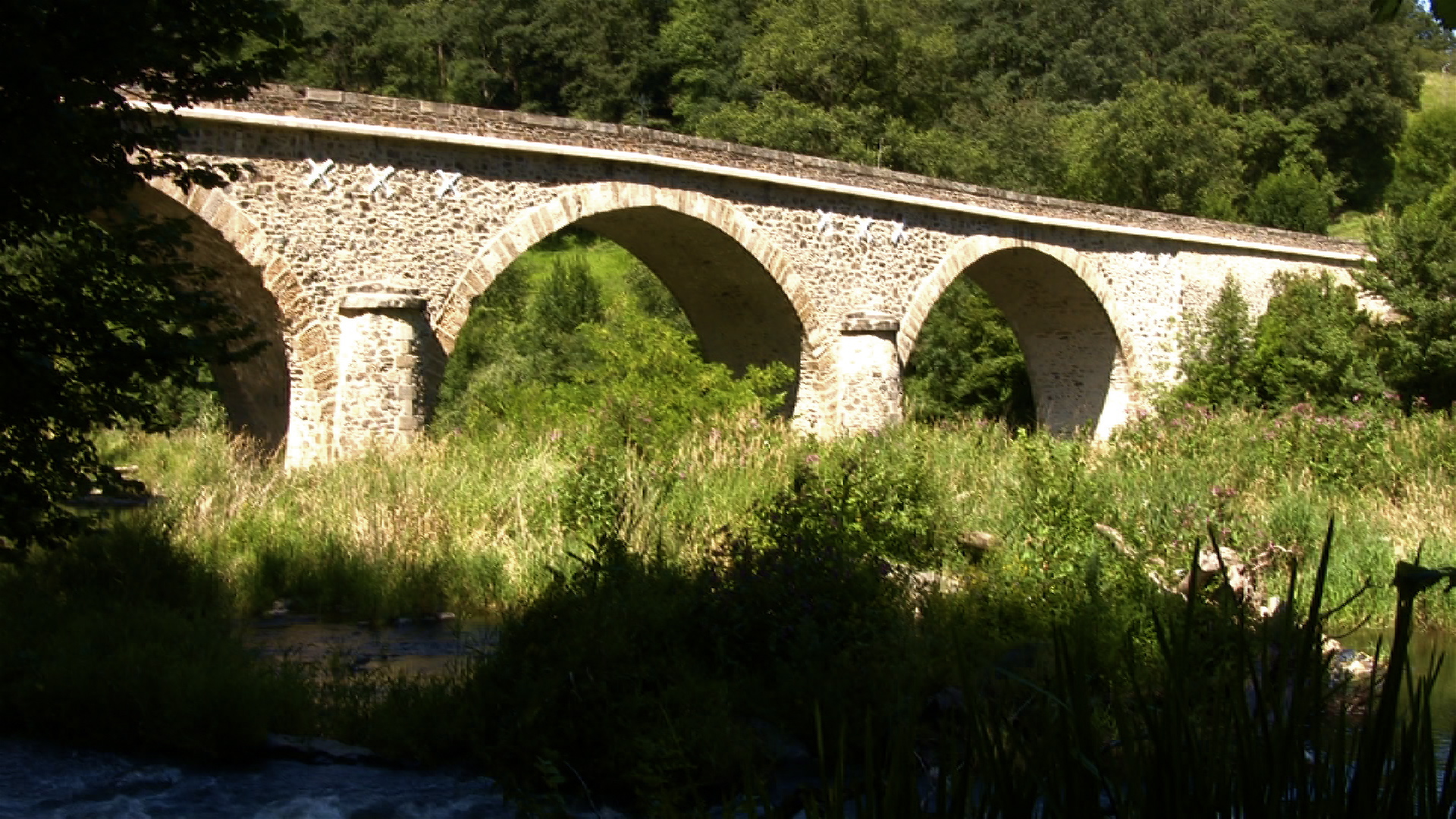
Chipole bridge

It is the third bridge built at this place of the valley;

In 1329, the Lord of Pomayrols of the time made build the first, it was located at the hamlet of Chipole, it was destroyed by one of violent raw which the valleyundergoes during the winter 1705 .

In 1859 a second and transitory bridge were built again. Builds in precipitation, inaugurated on 16 October 1859, it did not support the first raw arrival and collapsed on 5 January 1860.

The current bridge dates back to 1871, its construction was financed by the State. In 2000 it was consolidated and entirely renovated.

== Archives ==
Old pictures:

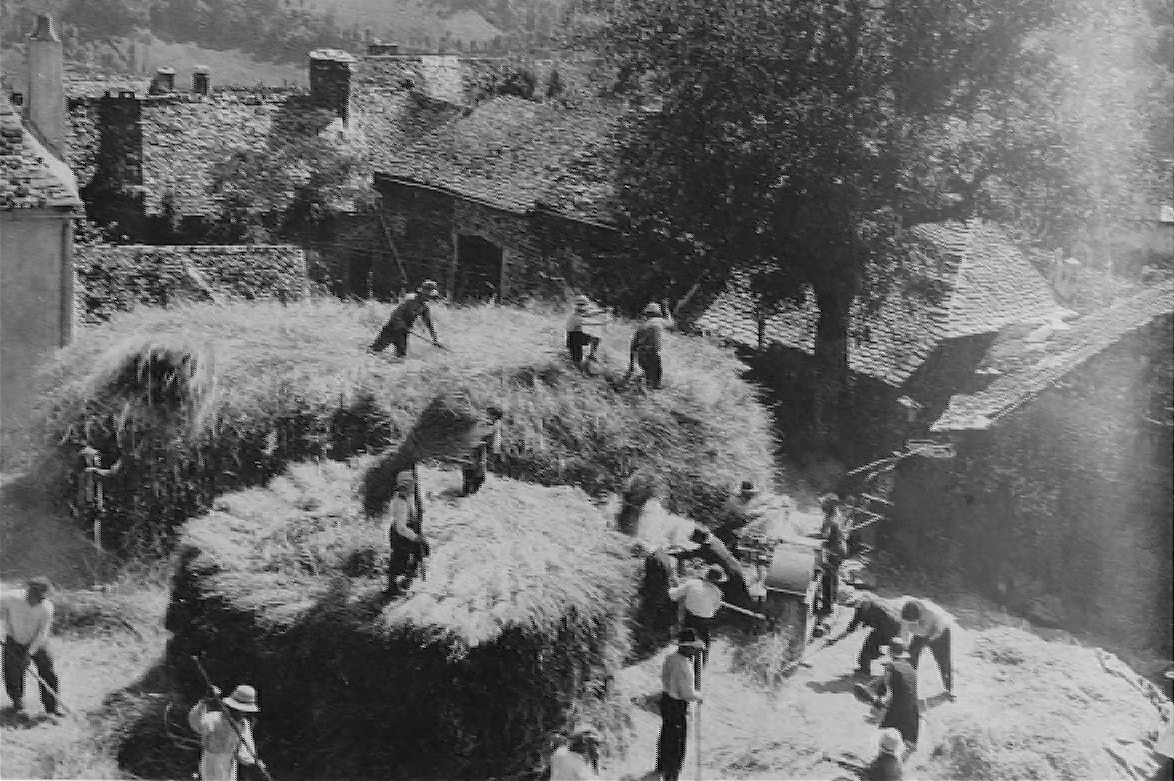
beating of corn on the ground in front of the castle. .

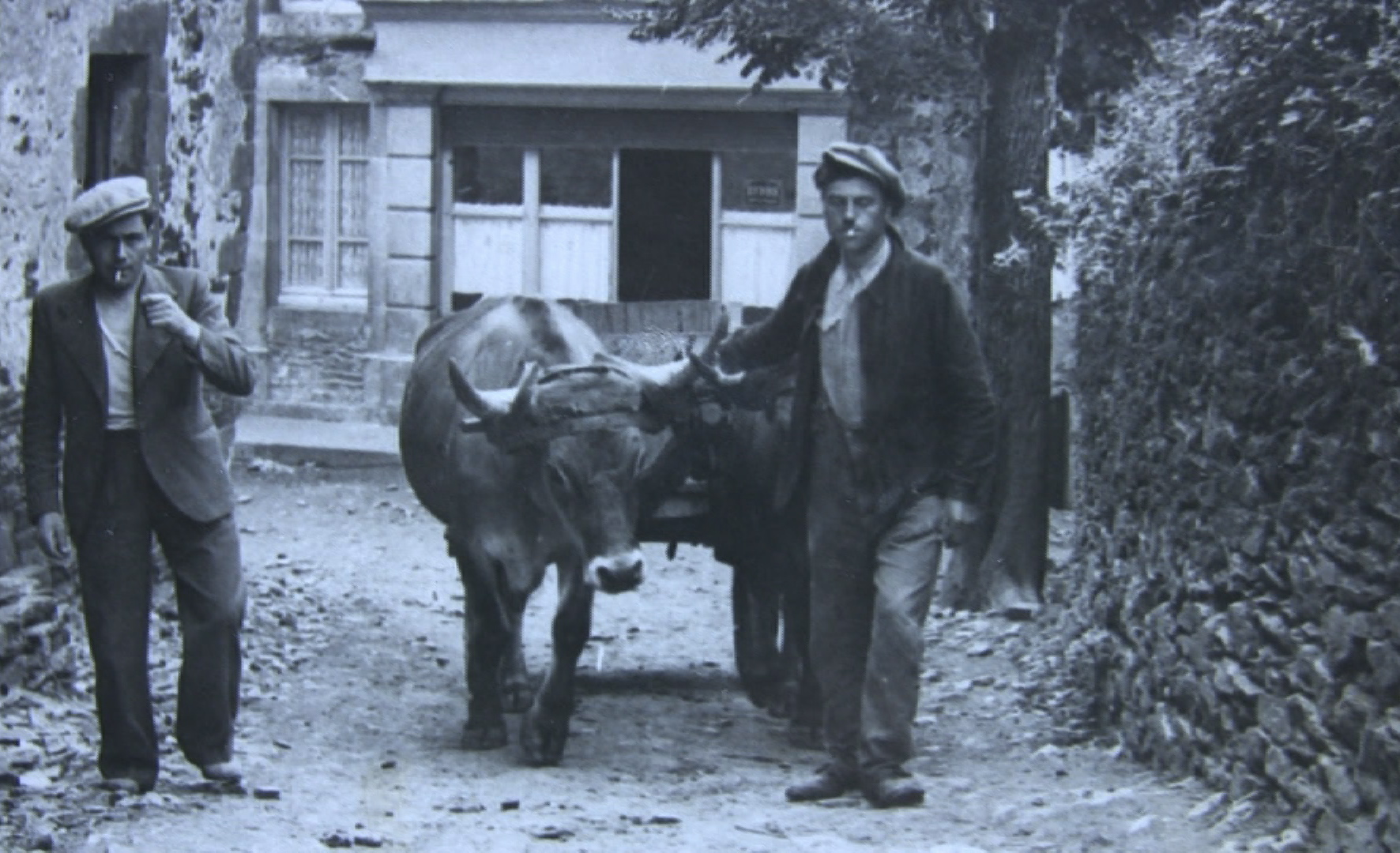
a street of the village in 1935.

Parochial registers and of marital status since:

Genealogical examinations:

Municipal deliberations since:

Personalities related to the commune

The canon Jean Pierre Bourgade, (1809–1880) general chaplain of the Navy.

== See also ==
- Communes of the Aveyron department
