= Chaos de Montpellier-le-Vieux =

Coordinates: 44°08′13″N 3°12′10″E

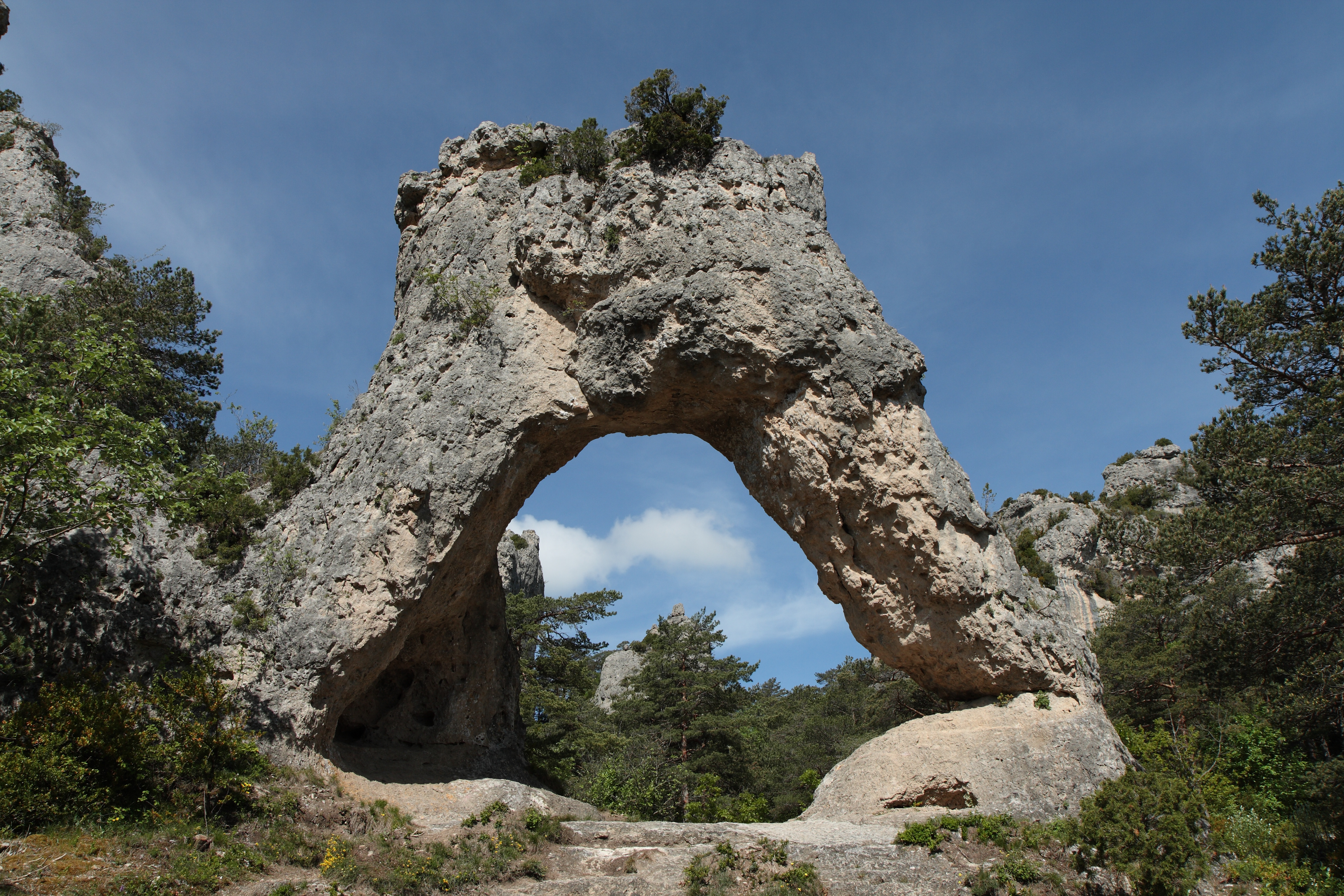
La porte de Mycène

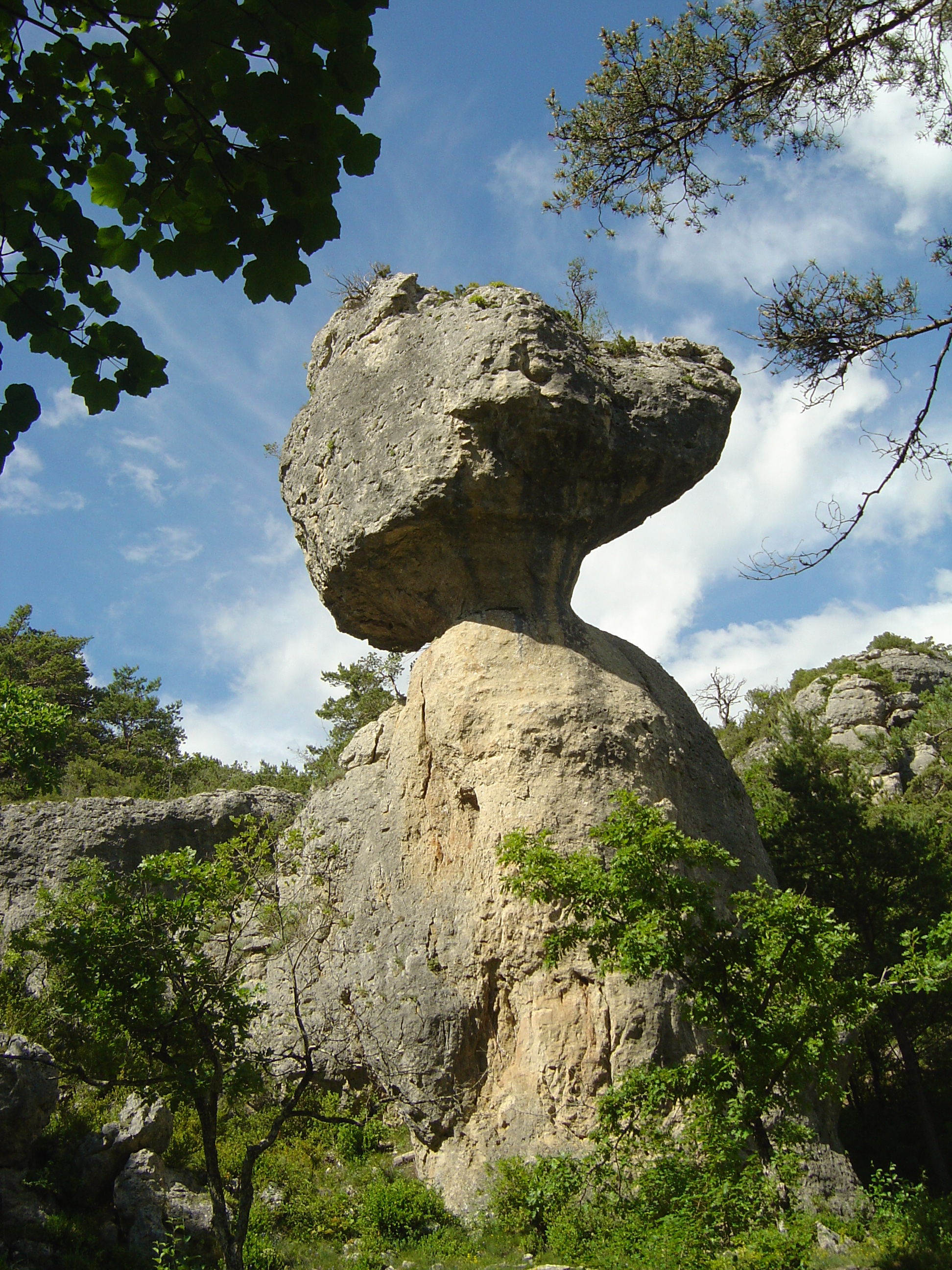
Roc Camparolié

The Chaos de Montpellier-le-Vieux is a 120-hectare (297-acre) blockfield at the southern edge of the Causse Noir, above the Gorges de la Dourbie, north-east of Millau and its famous viaduct, in the commune of La Roque-Sainte-Marguerite, Aveyron, France.

The rocks consist of dolomite.

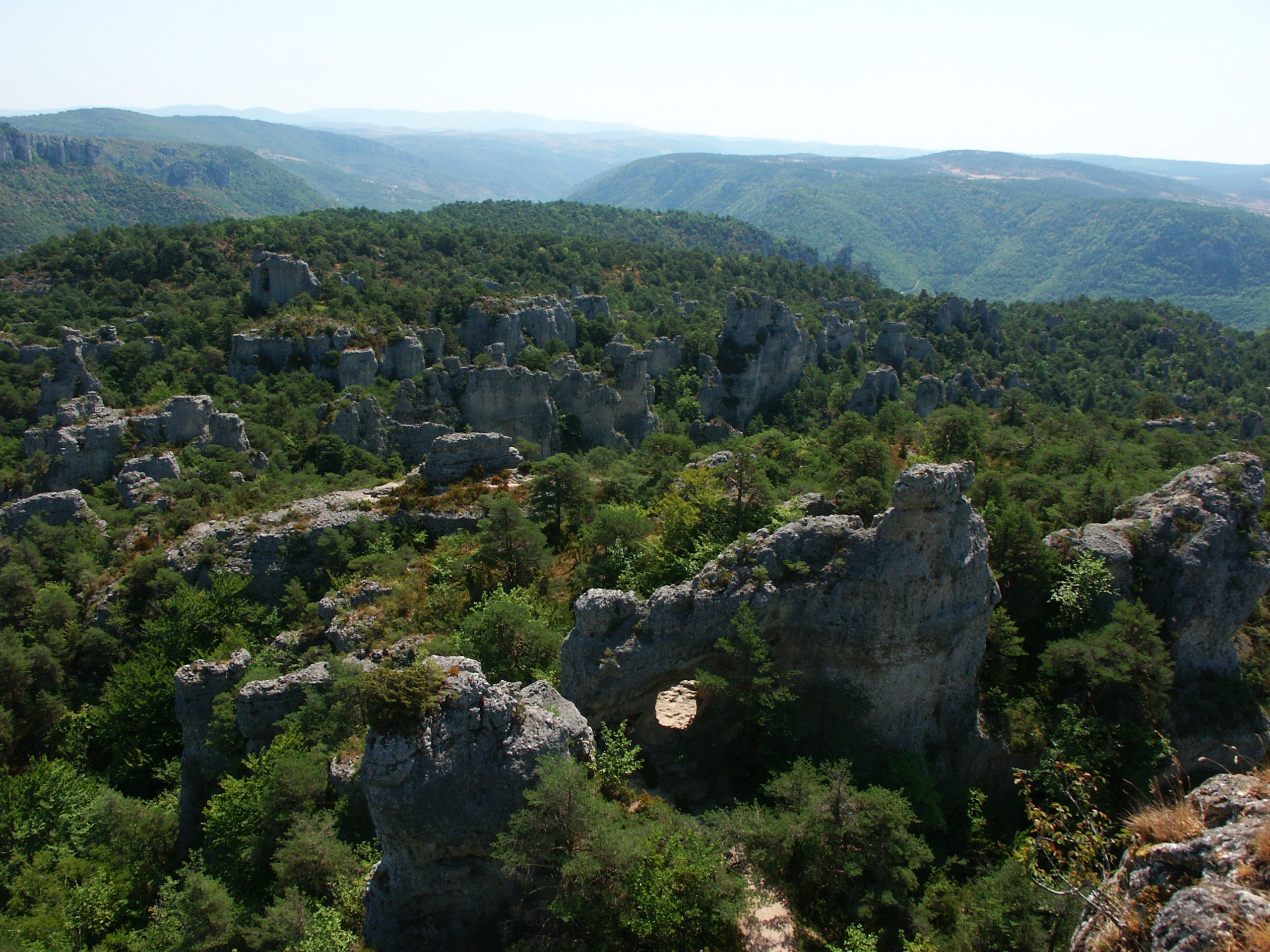
View from le Douminial

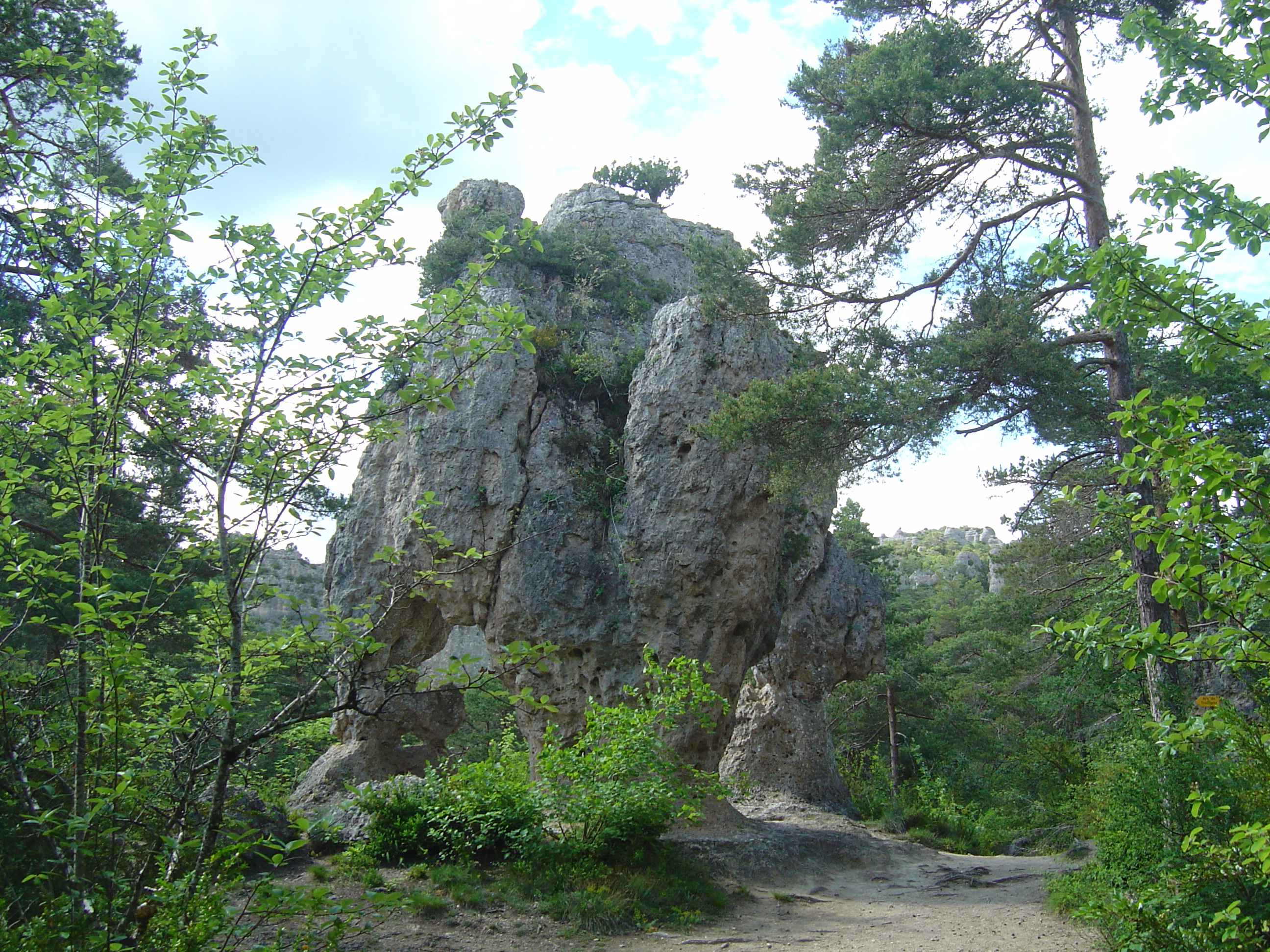
Arc de triomphe du chaos de Montpellier-le-Vieux

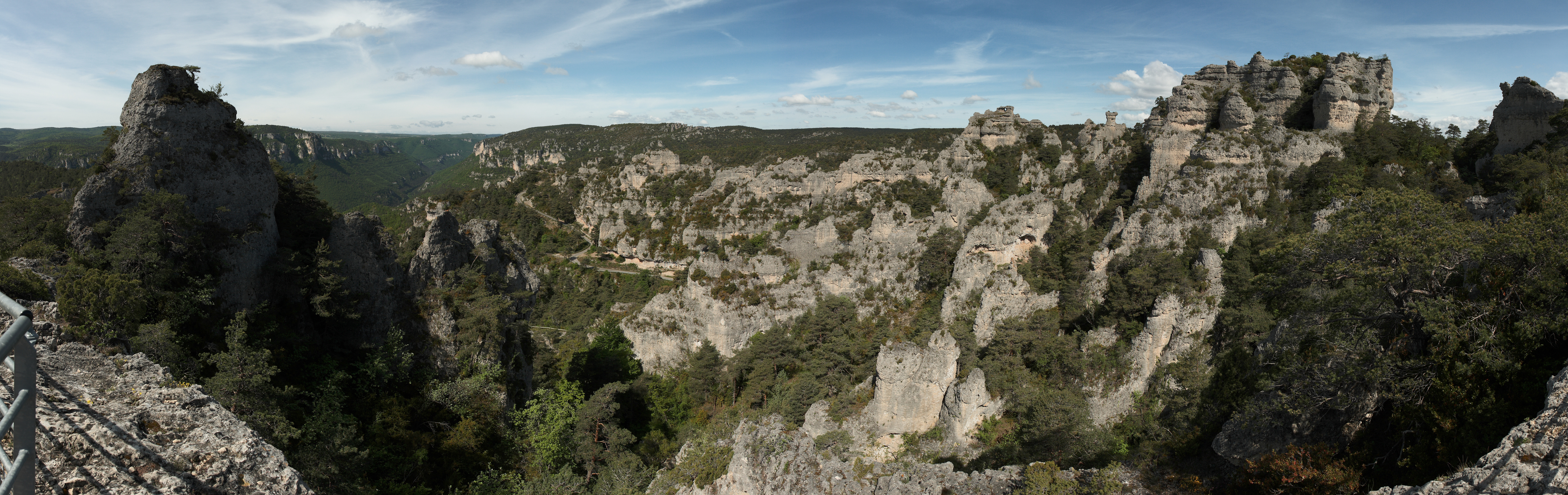
Le Douminial, highest point of the blockfield, on the right
