= Canton of Tarn et Causses =

Coordinates: 44.32°N 3.07°E

- Canton
- Situation of the canton of Tarn et Causses in the department of Aveyron
- Country: France
- Region: Occitania
- Department: Aveyron
- No. of communes: {{{nbcomm}}}
- Population (2023): 10,299
- INSEE code: 1220

The canton of Tarn et Causses is an administrative division of the Aveyron department, southern France. It was created at the French canton reorganisation which came into effect in March 2015. Its seat is in Sévérac-d'Aveyron.

It consists of the following communes:

1. Campagnac
2. La Capelle-Bonance
3. Castelnau-Pégayrols
4. La Cresse
5. Montjaux
6. Mostuéjouls
7. Peyreleau
8. Rivière-sur-Tarn
9. La Roque-Sainte-Marguerite
10. Saint-André-de-Vézines
11. Saint-Beauzély
12. Saint-Laurent-d'Olt
13. Saint-Martin-de-Lenne
14. Saint-Saturnin-de-Lenne
15. Sévérac-d'Aveyron
16. Verrières
17. Veyreau
18. Viala-du-Tarn
