= Saint-André-de-Vézines =

Commune in Occitanie, France

- Commune
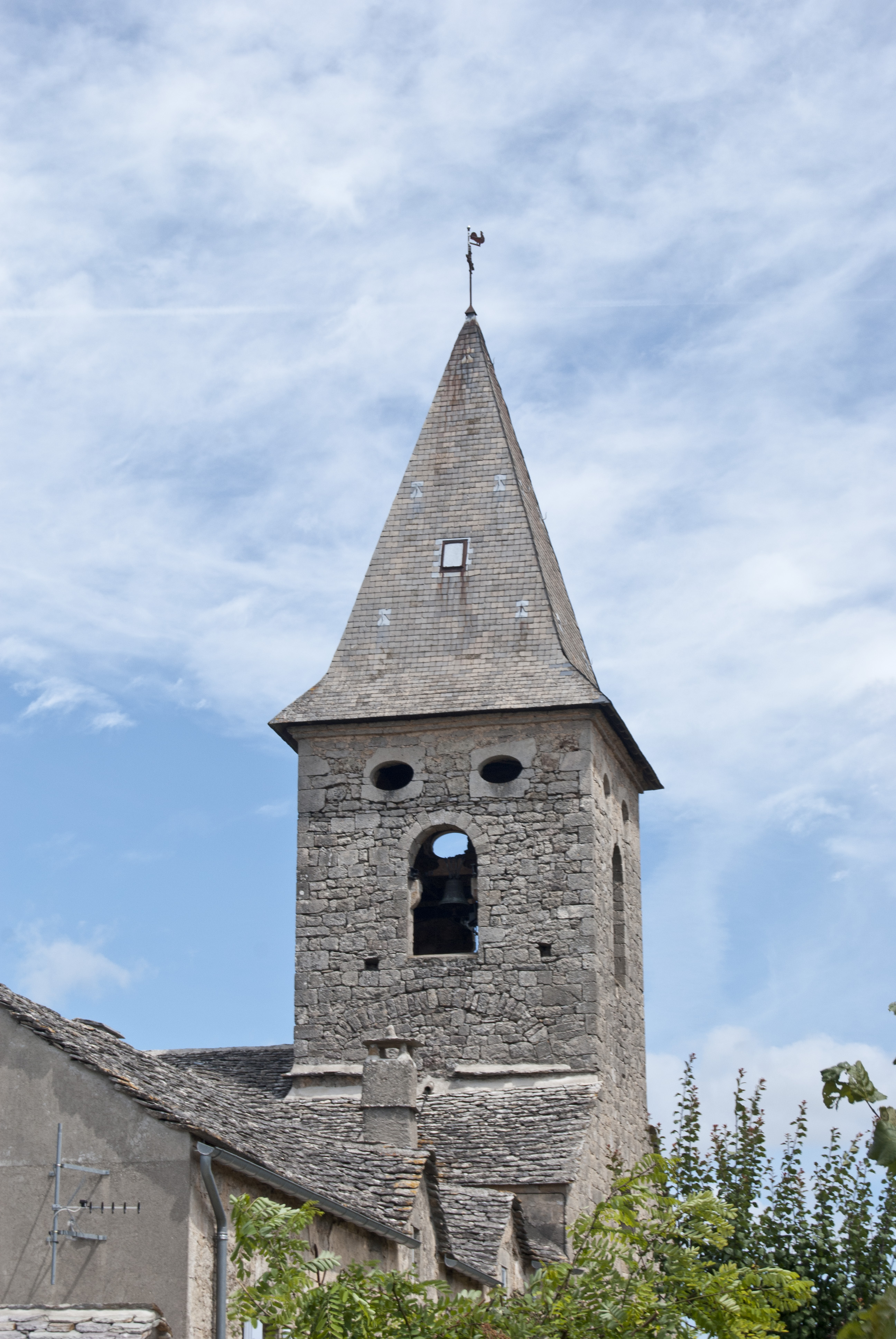
- The church in Saint-André-de-Vézines
- Location of Saint-André-de-Vézines
- Location within France Location within Occitanie
- Coordinates: 44°09′11″N 3°15′32″E
- Country: France
- Region: Occitania
- Department: Aveyron
- Arrondissement: Millau
- Canton: Tarn et Causses
- Intercommunality: Millau Grands Causses

Government
  - Mayor (2020–2026): Christian Boudes
- Area^{1}: 38.97 km^{2} (15.05 sq mi)
- Elevation: 876 m (2,874 ft)
- Highest elevation: 983 m (3,225 ft)
- Lowest elevation: 396 m (1,299 ft)
- Population (2023): 130
  - Density: 3.3/km^{2} (8.6/sq mi)
- Time zone: UTC+01:00 (CET)
  - Summer (DST): UTC+02:00 (CEST)
- INSEE/Postal code: 12211 /12720
- ^{1} French Land Register data, which excludes lakes, ponds, glaciers > 1 km^{2} (0.386 sq mi or 247 acres) and river estuaries.

Saint-André-de-Vézines (French pronunciation: [sɛ̃.t‿ɑ̃dʁe də vezin]; Occitan: Sant Andrieu) is a commune in the Aveyron department in southern France.

== Population ==
Historical population
Year	Pop.	±% p.a.
1968	109	—
1975	102	−0.94%
1982	120	+2.35%
1990	108	−1.31%
1999	117	+0.89%
2007	123	+0.63%
2012	128	+0.80%
2017	135	+1.07%
2023	130	−0.63%
Source: INSEE

== See also ==
- Communes of the Aveyron department
