= Mostuéjouls =

Commune in Occitanie, France

- Commune
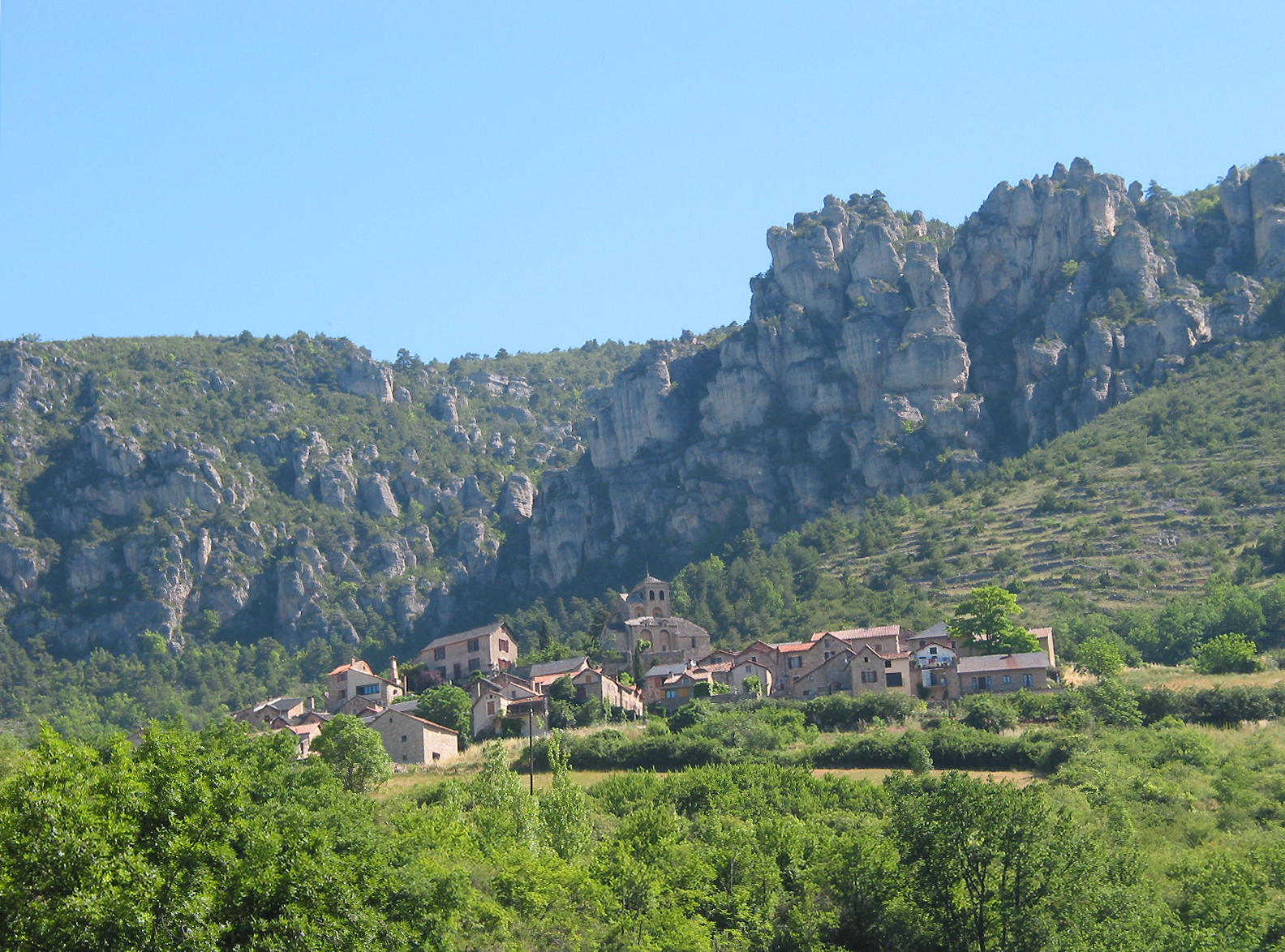
- The village of Liaucous

- Coat of arms
- Location of Mostuéjouls
- Location within France Location within Occitanie
- Coordinates: 44°12′14″N 3°11′04″E
- Country: France
- Region: Occitania
- Department: Aveyron
- Arrondissement: Millau
- Canton: Tarn et Causses
- Intercommunality: Millau Grands Causses

Government
  - Mayor (2020–2026): Christine Bedel
- Area^{1}: 30.95 km^{2} (11.95 sq mi)
- Elevation: 460 m (1,510 ft)
- Highest elevation: 962 m (3,156 ft)
- Lowest elevation: 376 m (1,234 ft)
- Population (2023): 333
  - Density: 10.8/km^{2} (27.9/sq mi)
- Time zone: UTC+01:00 (CET)
  - Summer (DST): UTC+02:00 (CEST)
- INSEE/Postal code: 12160 /12720
- ^{1} French Land Register data, which excludes lakes, ponds, glaciers > 1 km^{2} (0.386 sq mi or 247 acres) and river estuaries.

Mostuéjouls (French pronunciation: [mɔstɥeʒul]; Occitan: Mostuèjols) is a commune in the Aveyron department in southern France.

== Population ==
Historical population
Year	Pop.	±% p.a.
1968	260	—
1975	217	−2.55%
1982	232	+0.96%
1990	249	+0.89%
1999	264	+0.65%
2007	277	+0.60%
2012	296	+1.34%
2017	315	+1.25%
2023	333	+0.93%
Source: INSEE

== Notable locals ==
- Raymond de Mimèges = de Mostuèjouls, chaplain of Pope John XXII, first bishop of Diocese of Saint-Flour (1317-1319), bishop of Diocese of Saint-Papoul, created Cardinal in 1327

== See also ==
- Communes of the Aveyron department
