= Saint-Martin-de-Lenne =

Commune in Occitanie, France

- Commune
- Location of Saint-Martin-de-Lenne
- Location within France Location within Occitanie
- Coordinates: 44°25′56″N 2°57′56″E
- Country: France
- Region: Occitania
- Department: Aveyron
- Arrondissement: Rodez
- Canton: Tarn et Causses

Government
  - Mayor (2020–2026): Sébastien Cros
- Area^{1}: 9.48 km^{2} (3.66 sq mi)
- Elevation: 630 m (2,070 ft)
- Highest elevation: 840 m (2,760 ft)
- Lowest elevation: 480 m (1,570 ft)
- Population (2023): 340
  - Density: 36/km^{2} (93/sq mi)
- Time zone: UTC+01:00 (CET)
  - Summer (DST): UTC+02:00 (CEST)
- INSEE/Postal code: 12239 /12130
- ^{1} French Land Register data, which excludes lakes, ponds, glaciers > 1 km^{2} (0.386 sq mi or 247 acres) and river estuaries.

Saint-Martin-de-Lenne (French pronunciation: [sɛ̃ maʁtɛ̃ də lɛn]; Languedocien: Sent Martin) is a commune in the Aveyron department in southern France.

== Population ==
Historical population
Year	Pop.	±% p.a.
1968	310	—
1975	284	−1.24%
1982	270	−0.72%
1990	234	−1.77%
1999	208	−1.30%
2007	243	+1.96%
2012	301	+4.37%
2017	302	+0.07%
2023	340	+1.99%
Source: INSEE

== See also ==
- Communes of the Aveyron department
