= La Cresse =

Commune in Occitanie, France

- Commune
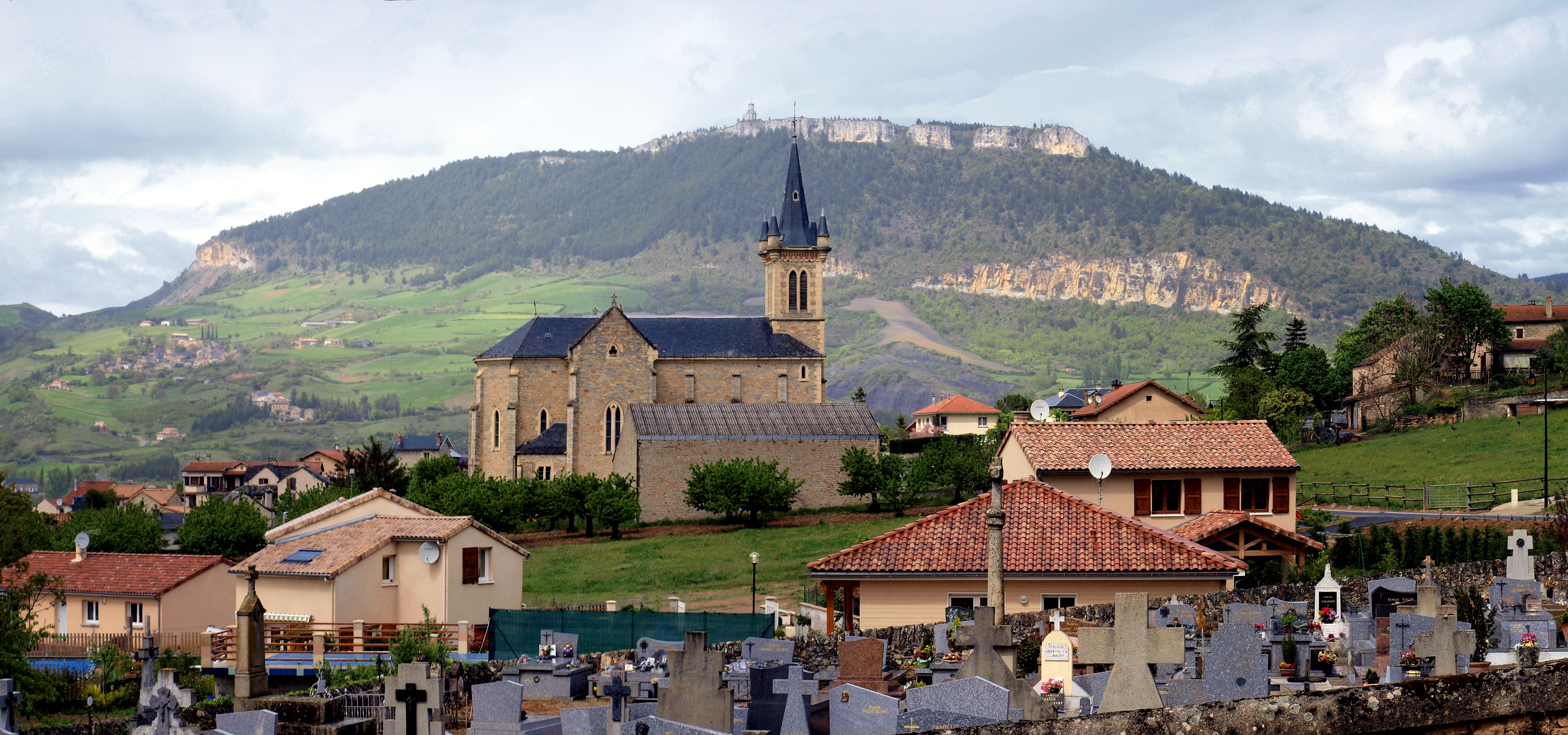
- The centre of the village

- Coat of arms
- Location of La Cresse
- Location within France Location within Occitanie
- Coordinates: 44°10′43″N 3°07′50″E
- Country: France
- Region: Occitania
- Department: Aveyron
- Arrondissement: Millau
- Canton: Tarn et Causses
- Intercommunality: Millau Grands Causses

Government
  - Mayor (2020–2026): Danièle Vergonnier
- Area^{1}: 19.06 km^{2} (7.36 sq mi)
- Elevation: 410 m (1,350 ft)
- Highest elevation: 868 m (2,848 ft)
- Lowest elevation: 372 m (1,220 ft)
- Population (2023): 333
  - Density: 17.5/km^{2} (45.3/sq mi)
- Time zone: UTC+01:00 (CET)
  - Summer (DST): UTC+02:00 (CEST)
- INSEE/Postal code: 12086 /12640
- ^{1} French Land Register data, which excludes lakes, ponds, glaciers > 1 km^{2} (0.386 sq mi or 247 acres) and river estuaries.

La Cresse (French pronunciation: [la kʁɛs]; Occitan: La Cressa) is a commune in the Aveyron department in southern France.

== Population ==
Historical population
Year	Pop.	±% p.a.
1968	239	—
1975	214	−1.57%
1982	231	+1.10%
1990	255	+1.24%
1999	273	+0.76%
2007	309	+1.56%
2012	329	+1.26%
2017	317	−0.74%
2023	333	+0.82%
Source: INSEE

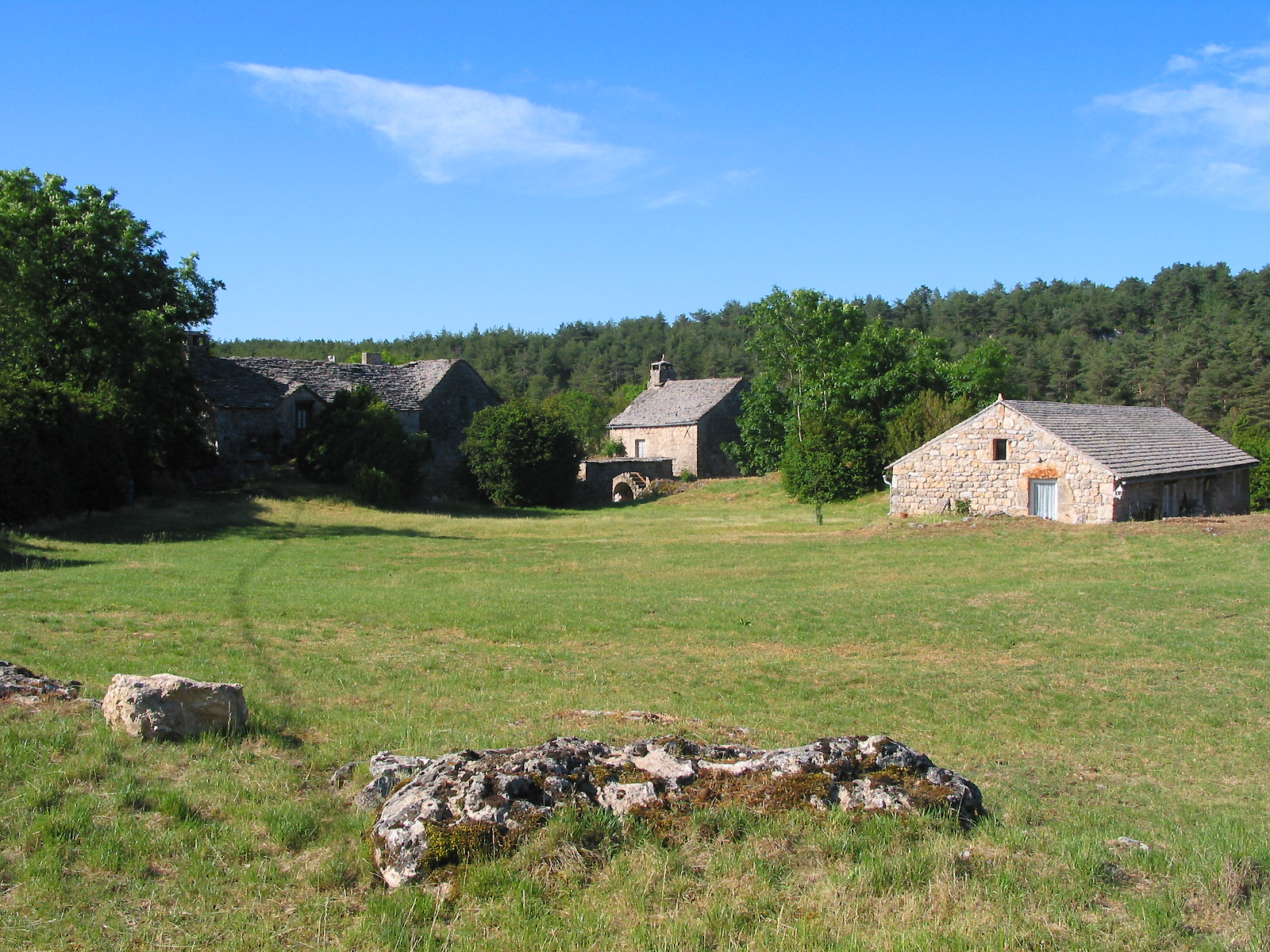
Farm inn "La Tindelle".

== See also ==
- Communes of the Aveyron department
