= Montjaux =

Commune in Occitanie, France

- Commune
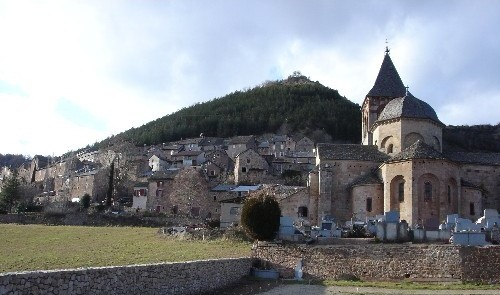
- Romanesque church

- Coat of arms
- Location of Montjaux
- Location within France Location within Occitanie
- Coordinates: 44°06′12″N 2°54′23″E
- Country: France
- Region: Occitania
- Department: Aveyron
- Arrondissement: Millau
- Canton: Tarn et Causses

Government
  - Mayor (2020–2026): Colette Lembert
- Area^{1}: 31.48 km^{2} (12.15 sq mi)
- Elevation: 600 m (2,000 ft)
- Highest elevation: 1,087 m (3,566 ft)
- Lowest elevation: 340 m (1,120 ft)
- Population (2023): 436
  - Density: 13.9/km^{2} (35.9/sq mi)
- Time zone: UTC+01:00 (CET)
  - Summer (DST): UTC+02:00 (CEST)
- INSEE/Postal code: 12153 /12490
- ^{1} French Land Register data, which excludes lakes, ponds, glaciers > 1 km^{2} (0.386 sq mi or 247 acres) and river estuaries.

Montjaux (French pronunciation: [mɔ̃ʒo]; in Occitan Mont Jòus from the Latin Mons Jovis (Mount Jupiter)) is a commune in the Aveyron department in southern France.

== Population ==
Historical population
| Year | Pop. | ±% p.a. |
|---|---|---|
| 1968 | 501 | — |
| 1975 | 444 | −1.71% |
| 1982 | 423 | −0.69% |
| 1990 | 382 | −1.27% |
| 1999 | 388 | +0.17% |
| 2007 | 393 | +0.16% |
| 2012 | 392 | −0.05% |
| 2017 | 406 | +0.70% |
| 2023 | 436 | +1.20% |
Source: INSEE

== See also ==
- Communes of the Aveyron department
