= Campagnac, Aveyron =

Commune in Occitanie, France

Campagnac
- Commune
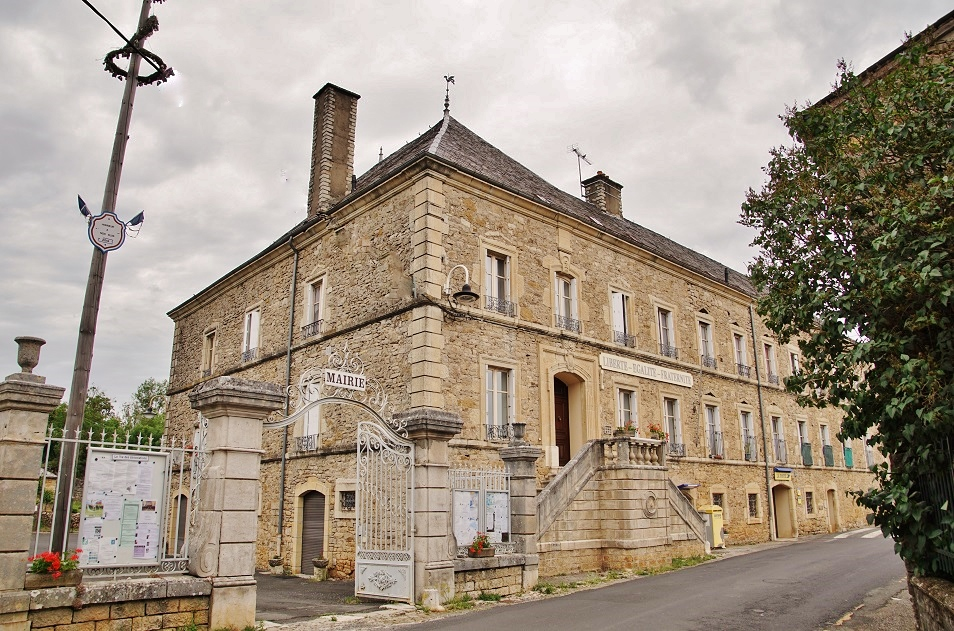
- Campagnac Town hall

- Coat of arms
- Location of Campagnac
- Location within France Location within Occitanie
- Coordinates: 44°25′06″N 3°05′16″E
- Country: France
- Region: Occitania
- Department: Aveyron
- Arrondissement: Rodez
- Canton: Tarn et Causses

Government
  - Mayor (2020–2026): Jean-Michel Ladet
- Area^{1}: 41.88 km^{2} (16.17 sq mi)
- Elevation: 729 m (2,392 ft)
- Highest elevation: 960 m (3,150 ft)
- Lowest elevation: 492 m (1,614 ft)
- Population (2023): 431
  - Density: 10.3/km^{2} (26.7/sq mi)
- Time zone: UTC+01:00 (CET)
  - Summer (DST): UTC+02:00 (CEST)
- INSEE/Postal code: 12047 /12560
- ^{1} French Land Register data, which excludes lakes, ponds, glaciers > 1 km^{2} (0.386 sq mi or 247 acres) and river estuaries.

Campagnac (French pronunciation: [kɑ̃paɲak]; Occitan: Campanhac) is a commune in the Aveyron department in southern France.

== Population ==
Historical population
Year	Pop.	±% p.a.
1968	556	—
1975	458	−2.73%
1982	399	−1.95%
1990	404	+0.16%
1999	396	−0.22%
2007	460	+1.89%
2012	450	−0.44%
2017	450	+0.00%
2023	431	−0.72%
Source: INSEE

== See also ==
- Communes of the Aveyron department
