= La Roque-Sainte-Marguerite =

Commune in Occitanie, France

- Commune
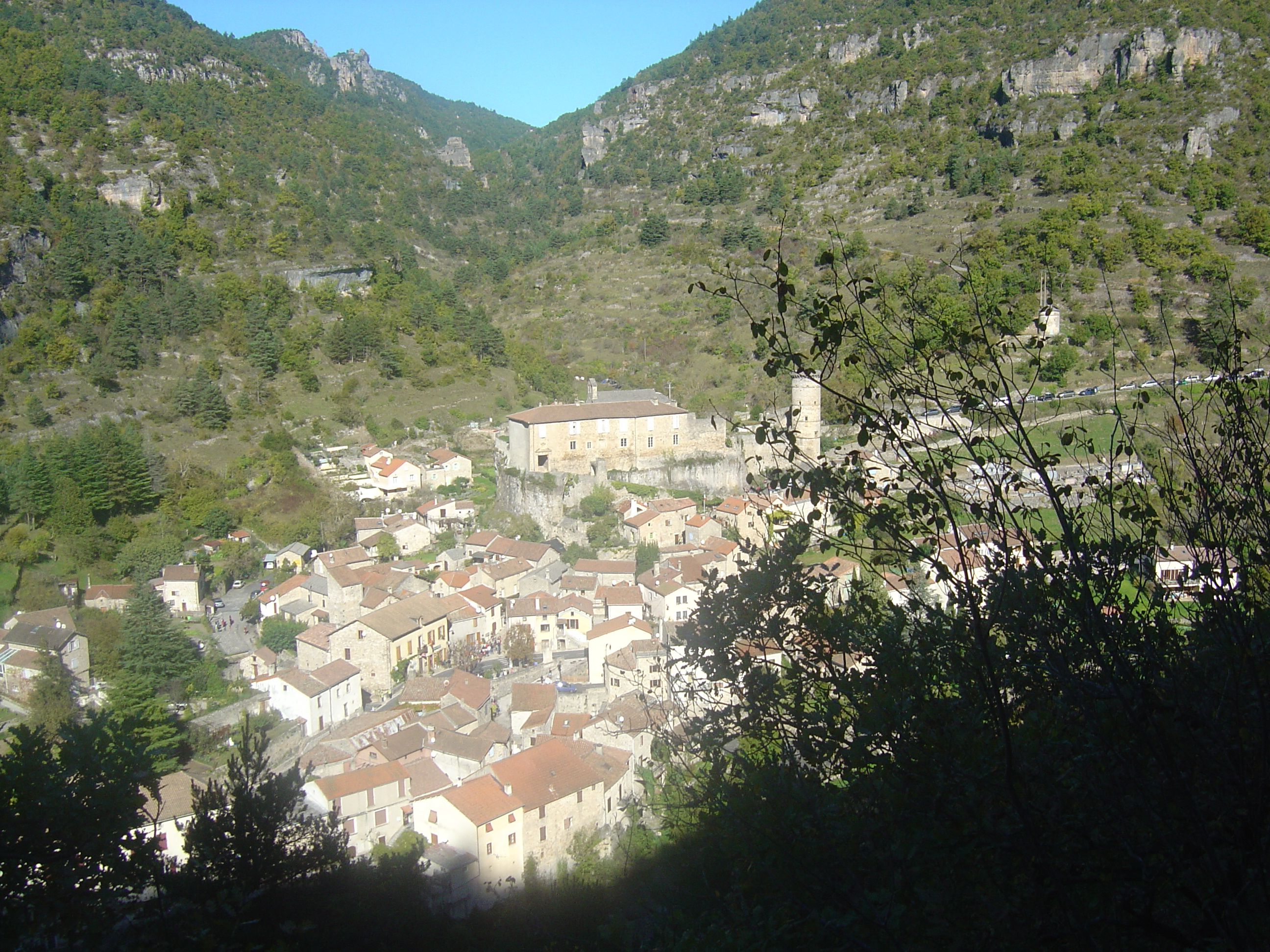
- A general view of La Roque-Sainte-Marguerite

- Coat of arms
- Location of La Roque-Sainte-Marguerite
- Location within France Location within Occitanie
- Coordinates: 44°07′33″N 3°13′25″E
- Country: France
- Region: Occitania
- Department: Aveyron
- Arrondissement: Millau
- Canton: Tarn et Causses
- Intercommunality: Millau Grands Causses

Government
  - Mayor (2020–2026): Annie Polycarpe
- Area^{1}: 49.4 km^{2} (19.1 sq mi)
- Elevation: 404 m (1,325 ft)
- Highest elevation: 909 m (2,982 ft)
- Lowest elevation: 385 m (1,263 ft)
- Population (2023): 182
  - Density: 3.68/km^{2} (9.54/sq mi)
- Time zone: UTC+01:00 (CET)
  - Summer (DST): UTC+02:00 (CEST)
- INSEE/Postal code: 12204 /12100
- ^{1} French Land Register data, which excludes lakes, ponds, glaciers > 1 km^{2} (0.386 sq mi or 247 acres) and river estuaries.

La Roque-Sainte-Marguerite (French pronunciation: [la ʁɔk sɛ̃t maʁɡərit]; Occitan: La Ròca) is a commune in the Aveyron department in southern France.

Lying deep in the scenic Dourbie gorge, the commune absorbed the formerly separate commune of St Verin in 1940, and it also incorporates the village of Pierrefiche du Larzac, which lies much higher on the Causse du Larzac (Larzac Plateau), at about 670 metres above sea level.

The village lies about 15 km (9.3 mi) east of Millau. The main industry for the residents who still work locally is tourism: the most visited site in Aveyron for tourists, Le Chaos de Montpellier-le-Vieux, is within its bounds. But most working residents commute into Millau.

On the Causse du Larzac, the villagers of Pierrefiche were shepherds, bringing their ewes' milk to the village dairy to make Roquefort cheese. Until recently there were two flocks of 50 & 200 ewes. The droughts of 2004 have reduced this to one. The sheepskins & fleeces went to Millau for the glove industry.

The castle was the western defence of the formerly heavily guarded Dourbie valley, which was a rich agricultural area in the Middle Ages. Old vine terraces can still be seen lining the deep chasm cut by the river through the Causse plateaux, some 300 m deep.

== Population ==
Historical population
Year	Pop.	±% p.a.
1968	142	—
1975	158	+1.54%
1982	145	−1.22%
1990	144	−0.09%
1999	172	+1.99%
2007	197	+1.71%
2012	192	−0.51%
2017	182	−1.06%
2023	182	+0.00%
Source: INSEE

== See also ==
- Communes of the Aveyron department
