= Veyreau =

Commune in Occitanie, France

- Commune
- Coat of arms
- Location of Veyreau
- Location within France Location within Occitanie
- Coordinates: 44°11′09″N 3°18′00″E
- Country: France
- Region: Occitania
- Department: Aveyron
- Arrondissement: Millau
- Canton: Tarn et Causses
- Intercommunality: Millau Grands Causses

Government
  - Mayor (2022–2026): Régis Cartayrade
- Area^{1}: 41.09 km^{2} (15.86 sq mi)
- Elevation: 885 m (2,904 ft)
- Highest elevation: 1,011 m (3,317 ft)
- Lowest elevation: 428 m (1,404 ft)
- Population (2023): 124
  - Density: 3.02/km^{2} (7.82/sq mi)
- Time zone: UTC+01:00 (CET)
  - Summer (DST): UTC+02:00 (CEST)
- INSEE/Postal code: 12293 /12720
- ^{1} French Land Register data, which excludes lakes, ponds, glaciers > 1 km^{2} (0.386 sq mi or 247 acres) and river estuaries.

Veyreau (French pronunciation: [vɛʁo]; Occitan: Vairau) is a commune in the Aveyron department in southern France.

== Population ==
Historical population
Year	Pop.	±% p.a.
1968	140	—
1975	110	−3.39%
1982	109	−0.13%
1990	106	−0.35%
1999	109	+0.31%
2007	124	+1.62%
2012	134	+1.56%
2017	137	+0.44%
2023	124	−1.65%
Source: INSEE

== See also ==
- Communes of the Aveyron department
