= Saint-Laurent-d'Olt =

Commune in Occitanie, France

- Commune
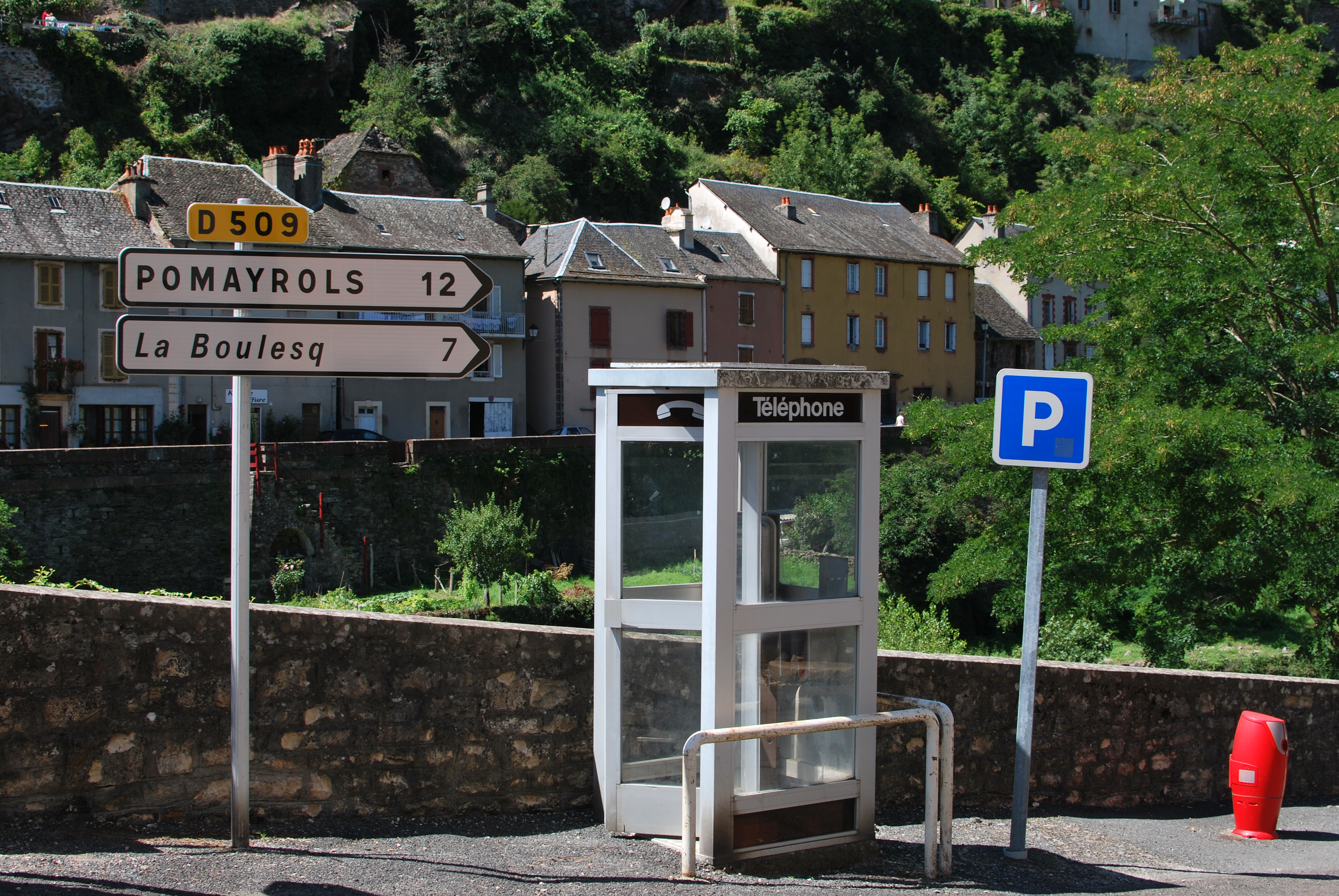
- Street furniture in Saint-Laurent-d'Olt

- Coat of arms
- Location of Saint-Laurent-d'Olt
- Location within France Location within Occitanie
- Coordinates: 44°26′49″N 3°06′42″E
- Country: France
- Region: Occitania
- Department: Aveyron
- Arrondissement: Rodez
- Canton: Tarn et Causses

Government
  - Mayor (2020–2026): Alain Vioulac
- Area^{1}: 38.74 km^{2} (14.96 sq mi)
- Elevation: 545 m (1,788 ft)
- Highest elevation: 1,033 m (3,389 ft)
- Lowest elevation: 448 m (1,470 ft)
- Population (2023): 623
  - Density: 16.1/km^{2} (41.7/sq mi)
- Time zone: UTC+01:00 (CET)
  - Summer (DST): UTC+02:00 (CEST)
- INSEE/Postal code: 12237 /12560
- ^{1} French Land Register data, which excludes lakes, ponds, glaciers > 1 km^{2} (0.386 sq mi or 247 acres) and river estuaries.

Saint-Laurent-d'Olt (French pronunciation: [sɛ̃ loʁɑ̃ dɔlt], literally Saint-Laurent of Olt; Occitan: Sant Laurenç d'Òlt) is a commune in the Aveyron department in southern France.

== Geography ==
Situated on the D988 departmental road, roughly equidistant between the towns of Millau, Rodez and Mende, and 3.5 km west of the A75 autoroute, Saint-Laurent-d'Olt is perched on a rocky ridge above the river Lot, at about 584 metres above sea level. The upper valley of the Lot divides the volcanic plateau of the Aubrac from the limestone plateaux of the Grands Causses.

In order to preserve the biodiversity of the area, the upper Lot valley between Espalion and Saint-Laurent-d'Olt is gazetted as part of the Natura 2000 network.

The commune is also part of the Parc naturel régional des Grands Causses.

== Institut Médico-Educatif (I.M.E.) ==
As well as providing services for the surrounding district, the village is home to an Institut Médico-Educatif, which is a residential school for children with intellectual handicaps, aged 6–20. The current roll is around 80 pupils. Founded in 1965, the Institut is the largest employer in the commune, employing 60 people.

== Population ==
Historical population
Year	Pop.	±% p.a.
1968	745	—
1975	728	−0.33%
1982	658	−1.43%
1990	659	+0.02%
1999	619	−0.69%
2007	650	+0.61%
2012	617	−1.04%
2017	646	+0.92%
2023	623	−0.60%
Source: INSEE

== See also ==
- Communes of the Aveyron department
