= La Capelle-Bonance =

Commune in Occitanie, France

- Commune
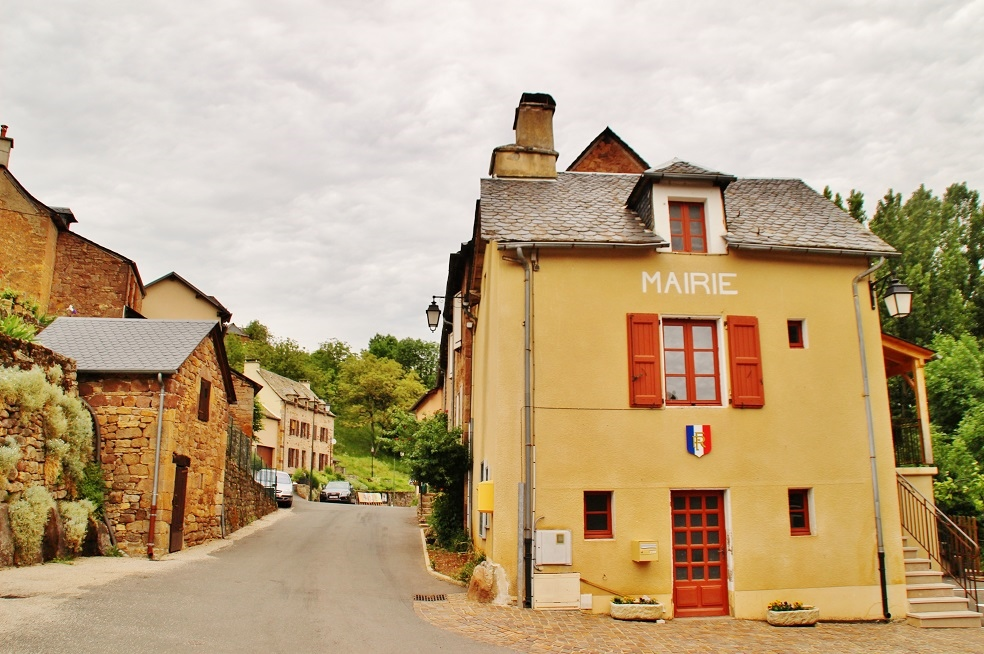
- Town hall
- Location of La Capelle-Bonance
- Location within France Location within Occitanie
- Coordinates: 44°26′35″N 3°00′47″E
- Country: France
- Region: Occitania
- Department: Aveyron
- Arrondissement: Rodez
- Canton: Tarn et Causses

Government
  - Mayor (2020–2026): Jean-Louis Sannié
- Area^{1}: 14.12 km^{2} (5.45 sq mi)
- Elevation: 650 m (2,130 ft)
- Highest elevation: 855 m (2,805 ft)
- Lowest elevation: 444 m (1,457 ft)
- Population (2023): 95
  - Density: 6.7/km^{2} (17/sq mi)
- Time zone: UTC+01:00 (CET)
  - Summer (DST): UTC+02:00 (CEST)
- INSEE/Postal code: 12055 /12130
- ^{1} French Land Register data, which excludes lakes, ponds, glaciers > 1 km^{2} (0.386 sq mi or 247 acres) and river estuaries.

La Capelle-Bonance (French pronunciation: [la kapɛl bɔnɑ̃s]; Occitan: La Capèla Bonança) is a commune in the Aveyron department in southern France.

== Population ==
Historical population
Year	Pop.	±% p.a.
1968	202	—
1975	143	−4.81%
1982	139	−0.40%
1990	129	−0.93%
1999	95	−3.34%
2007	88	−0.95%
2012	98	+2.18%
2017	83	−3.27%
2023	95	+2.28%
Source: INSEE

== See also ==
- Communes of the Aveyron department
