= Balaguier-sur-Rance =

Commune in Occitanie, France

- Commune
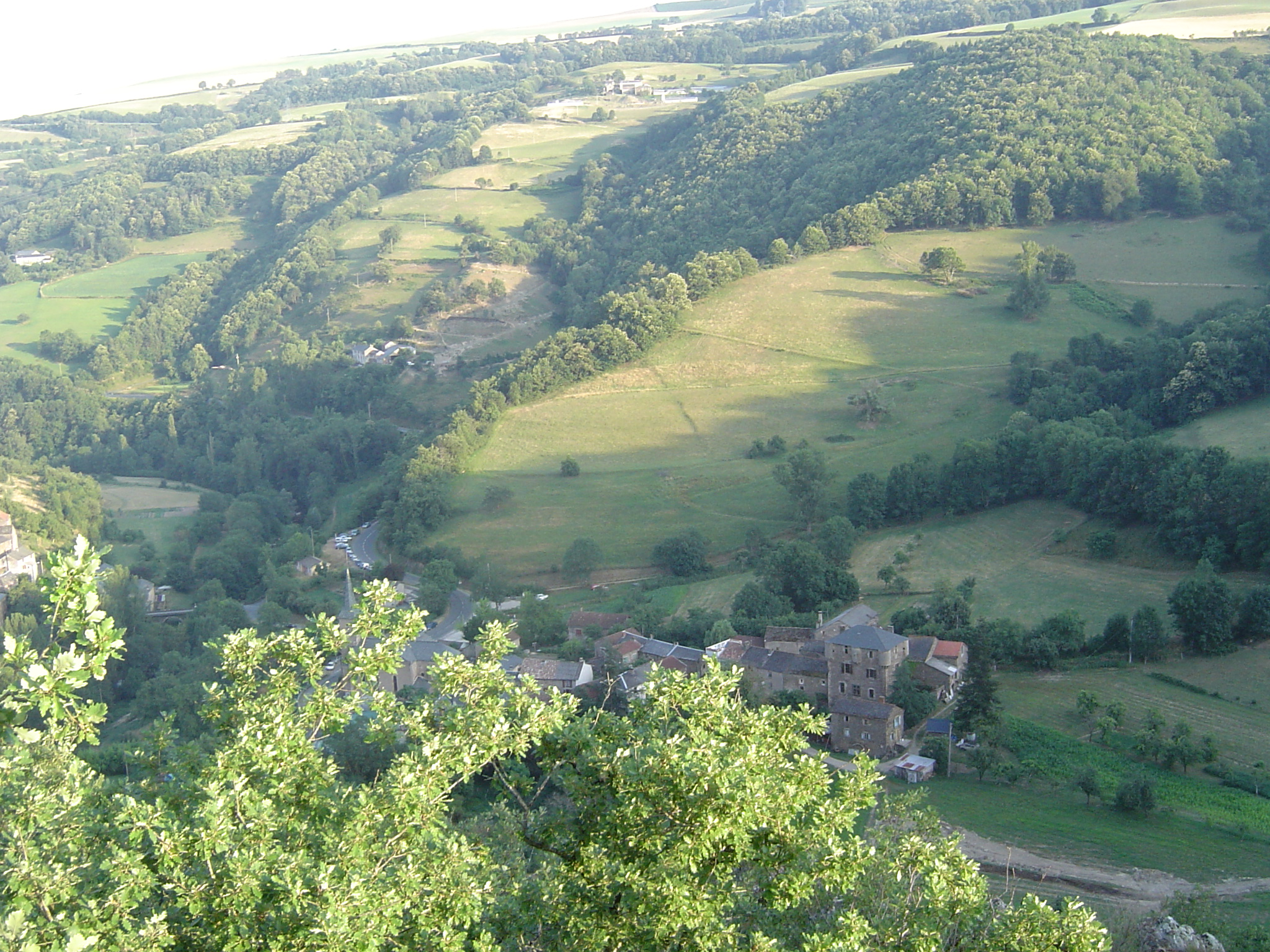
- Balaguier-sur-Rance seen from the nearby hillside
- Location of Balaguier-sur-Rance
- Location within France Location within Occitanie
- Coordinates: 43°53′55″N 2°34′39″E
- Country: France
- Region: Occitania
- Department: Aveyron
- Arrondissement: Millau
- Canton: Causses-Rougiers

Government
  - Mayor (2020–2026): David Maury
- Area^{1}: 9.8 km^{2} (3.8 sq mi)
- Elevation: 271 m (889 ft)
- Highest elevation: 748 m (2,454 ft)
- Lowest elevation: 253 m (830 ft)
- Population (2023): 90
  - Density: 9.2/km^{2} (24/sq mi)
- Time zone: UTC+01:00 (CET)
  - Summer (DST): UTC+02:00 (CEST)
- INSEE/Postal code: 12019 /12380
- ^{1} French Land Register data, which excludes lakes, ponds, glaciers > 1 km^{2} (0.386 sq mi or 247 acres) and river estuaries.

Balaguier-sur-Rance (French pronunciation: [balaɡje syʁ ʁɑ̃s]; Occitan: Balaguièr de Rance) is a commune in the Aveyron department in the Occitanie region of southern France.

== Geography ==
Balaguier-sur-Rance is located some 32 km east of Albi and just north of Saint-Sernin-sur-Rance. The whole western border of the commune is the departmental boundary between Aveyron and Tarn. The commune is divided into two parts situated on either side of the Rance river. Balaguier le Maigre (the thin) or le Vieux (the old) is on the right bank with its houses clinging to a rocky outcrop that supported a fortified structure of which there remains no trace. On the left bank is Balaguier le Gras (the fat) with the church, the town hall, and a chateau from the 15th and 16th centuries. Both banks are connected by a stone bridge from the 15th century. Access to the commune is by the D33 road from Curvalle in the north-west which passes through the commune and the village and joins the D999 on the communal border then continues to Saint-Sernin-sur-Rance. The D999 passes through the south of the commune as it goes from Alban to Vabres-l'Abbaye.

The Rance river flows through the centre of the commune from east to west where it continues north-west to join the Tarn east of Trébas. Many tributaries rise in the commune on both banks of the Rance and flow into it.

== Administration ==
List of Successive Mayors

From	To	Name
1846	1870	Pierre Cadas
1870	1876	Casimir Guy
1876	1902	Pierre Sylvain Frédéric Villeneuve
1902	1904	Auguste Louis Cadas
1995	2014	Philippe Boularan
2014	2026	David Maury

== Demography ==
The inhabitants of the commune are known as Balaguiérois or Balaguiéroises in French.

Historical population

Year	Pop.	±% p.a.
1793	360	—
1846	519	+0.69%
1872	510	−0.07%
1901	446	−0.46%
1926	330	−1.20%
1946	268	−1.04%
1962	209	−1.54%
1968	172	−3.20%

Year	Pop.	±% p.a.
1975	150	−1.94%
1982	127	−2.35%
1990	104	−2.47%
1999	100	−0.43%
2007	91	−1.17%
2012	100	+1.90%
2017	92	−1.65%
2023	90	−0.37%

Source: EHESS and INSEE

== Sites and monuments ==
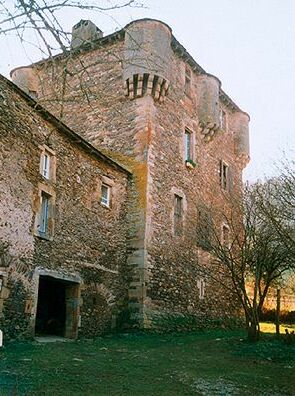
The Chateau Keep

- A copy of a menhir statue found when working under the main road in the village.
- A Chateau Keep from the 15th and 16th centuries.

== Notable people linked to the commune ==
- Hippolyte Coste, born 20 December 1858 in Balaguier-sur-Rance at Mas d'Estioussès.

== See also ==
- Communes of the Aveyron department
