= Paulinet =

- Commune
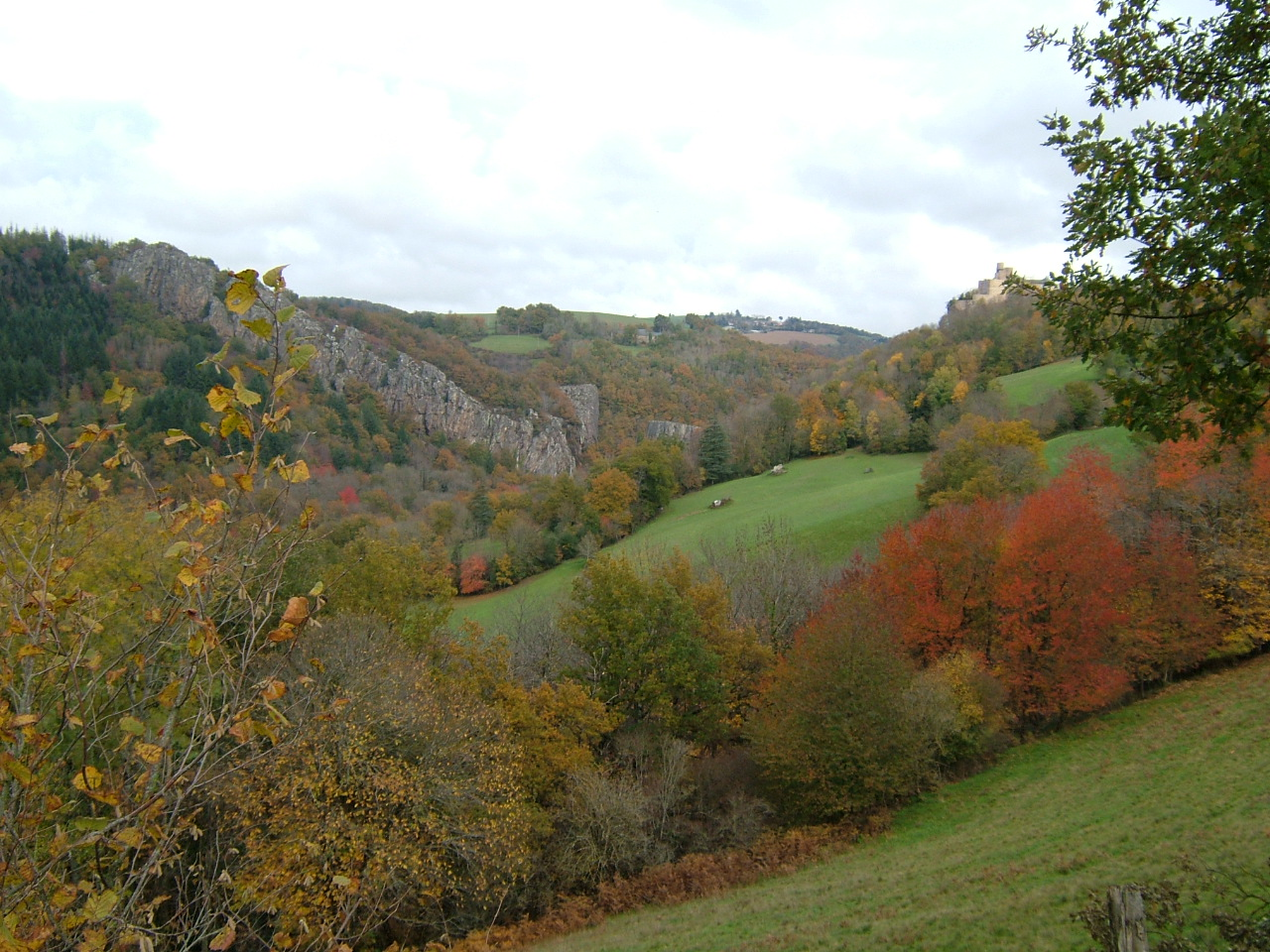
- Gorge of Oulas and Castle Paulin

- Coat of arms
- Location of Paulinet
- Location within France Location within Occitanie
- Coordinates: 43°50′58″N 2°25′50″E
- Country: France
- Region: Occitania
- Department: Tarn
- Arrondissement: Albi
- Canton: Le Haut Dadou
- Intercommunality: CC Monts d'Alban et Villefranchois

Government
  - Mayor (2026–32): Martine Laclau
- Area^{1}: 73.75 km^{2} (28.48 sq mi)
- Elevation: 654 m (2,146 ft)
- Highest elevation: 704 m (2,310 ft)
- Lowest elevation: 360 m (1,180 ft)
- Population (2023): 498
  - Density: 6.75/km^{2} (17.5/sq mi)
- Time zone: UTC+01:00 (CET)
  - Summer (DST): UTC+02:00 (CEST)
- INSEE/Postal code: 81203 /81250
- ^{1} French Land Register data, which excludes lakes, ponds, glaciers > 1 km^{2} (0.386 sq mi or 247 acres) and river estuaries.

Paulinet (French pronunciation: [polinɛ]) is a commune in the Tarn department in southern France.

== Geography ==
The commune is traversed by the river Dadou. It is made of seven parishes and many smaller hamlets, eg. Connac, Le Masnau, Notre-Dame d'Ourtiguet, Paulin, Paulinet, Pommardelle, Ruèges, Saint-Jean-de-Jeannes, Terrabusset.

== History ==
The commune was created as Paulin in 1790. It inherited the pre-Revolution community of Paulin boundaries. Many territorial adjustments occurred during the 19th century to remove enclaves and exclaves. In 1833, the westernmost part of the commune became an independent commune as Teillet. In 1897, the commune was renamed Paulinet.

== See also ==
- Communes of the Tarn department
