= Bellegarde, Tarn =

Bellegarde
- Part of Bellegarde-Marsal
- Location of Bellegarde
- Location within France Location within Occitanie
- Coordinates: 43°54′27″N 2°16′26″E
- Country: France
- Region: Occitania
- Department: Tarn
- Arrondissement: Albi
- Canton: Le Haut Dadou
- Commune: Bellegarde-Marsal
- Area^{1}: 11.1 km^{2} (4.3 sq mi)
- Elevation: 344 m (1,129 ft)
- Highest elevation: 386 m (1,266 ft)
- Lowest elevation: 226 m (741 ft)
- Population (2013): 441
  - Density: 39.7/km^{2} (103/sq mi)
- Time zone: UTC+01:00 (CET)
  - Summer (DST): UTC+02:00 (CEST)
- Postal code: 81430
- ^{1} French Land Register data, which excludes lakes, ponds, glaciers > 1 km^{2} (0.386 sq mi or 247 acres) and river estuaries.

Bellegarde (French pronunciation: [bɛlɡaʁd]; Languedocien: Bèlagarda) is a former commune of the Tarn department of southern France. On 1 January 2016, it was merged into the new commune of Bellegarde-Marsal.

== See also ==
- Communes of the Tarn department
