= Samrong Sen =

Prehistoric archaeological site in Kampong Chhnang, Cambodia

- Somron-Seng, Somrong Seng, Somrong Sen, Som-Ron-Sen
- Location within Cambodia
- 12°13′0″N 104°47′0″E
- Location: Kampong Chhnang Province, Cambodia

Samrong Sen (alternates: Somron-Seng, Somrong Seng, Somrong Sen, Som-Ron-Sen; Khmer: សំរោងសែន) on the east bank of the Stueng Chinit River is a prehistoric archaeological site in the Kampong Chhnang Province, Cambodia. Consisting of a very large fluviatile shell midden, it flourished in particular from 1500 BC to 500 BC.

Excavations at Samrong Sen, which started in the 1880s, have been described as the earliest prehistoric archaeological studies which gave credence to the concept of Southeast Asian Bronze Age. Excavations conducted to depths of 6 metres (20 ft) stratifications have revealed that Samrong Sen provides a link to the professional skills and burial practices of the Bronze Age communities who lived in the Banchiang area on the banks of the Chinit River. As Samrong Sen was almost the only known prehistoric settlement in Cambodia for many years, it was visited by many archaeologists and its artefacts were studied by scientists in several countries. It has been characterized as a highly developed Stone Age culture in Indo-China.

== History ==
Though various spellings have been presented, "Samrong Sen" is considered to be correct. The site was first discovered and reported in 1876 by M. Rouques, Director of the Fluvial Transportation Company. Samrong Sen was subject to archaeological excavation from the late 19th century through the end of the 19th century, and also into the 20th century. The excavations show close relationship with Neolithic sites in Southeast Asia and also many Pacific Islands. They have revealed that the people who lived at Samrong Sen during the Bronze Age were very similar to the ancestors of the Funanese. Archaeological history of the village in general and the research finding of the archaeological site in particular have been reported by archaeologists Corre in 1879, Fuchs in 1882 and 1883, Mansuy in 1902, Mourer in 1994, Vanna in 1999, and many Cambodian archaeologists and researchers.

Initial villager excavations

Initial finds at Samrong Sen were by villagers' excavations while extracting for hydrated lime from shell excavations at this site; these initial finds were handed over by the villagers to the missionaries. After the first excavations of 1876 in the flood plains of Tonlé Sap, additional excavations were carried out by archaeologists at different locations within this site. Many of the large size collections made from the site during several excavations could have been from casual surface excavations and hence no specific methodology could be explained.

19th century

The earliest artefacts were found by Lieutenant Jean Moura in 1876; he was the Representative of the French protectorate of Cambodia in 1864. The stray archaeological finds were transported to France where they were analysed and interpreted. The Fuchs report of 1883 stated that the top layer consisted of recent flood deposit (inferred from recent pottery). Below this layer were shell lenses which contained black pytahanite, gouges, and chisels. There were also marine shell bracelets, as well as pottery vessels with varying type of incisions. Comparing it with the Mekong delta sediment deposits, Fuch inferred that the site existed a few centuries prior to the advent of Christian Epoch. These excavations also inferred that the site belonged to the Bronze Age on the basis of a comparison of the archaeological finds of similar sites in Thailand and Vietnam. Henri Alphonse Mansuy and Olov Janse, archaeologist from Sweden who found or purchased many of the artefacts, could not date them correctly since the carbon dating technique was not known at that time. The occupational sequence of the site could not be correctly assessed.

20th century

Systematic excavations with stratigraphic control started in 1902, and again in 1923 by Mansuy. Three layers were identified, which revealed shell lenses up to 4.5 metres (15 ft) depth. Arm bands and beads found here have similarity with those found in the Mekong sites. Pottery found here was not of any decorative type. Graves, however, gave many finds of fully formed bronze vessels. Excavations carried out in stratified layers have unearthed late Stone Age ceramics and also human remains, out of which many layers are dated 2000 BC, as per radiocarbon dating methods. However, the bronze collections were not found from excavations carried out in stratified layers. Several observations were made on the claims of archaeologists during the early stages of the excavations such as they were overzealous and that they over stated when presenting their findings.

Prior to the World War II, the site was again excavated by Janse. He collected many artefacts, which were examined in 1986 by Robert E. Murowchick of Boston University. During these excavations, a crucible (with remnants of scoria) was also found along with bracelets, socketed spearheads, axes and a bell. Chemical analysis of five antiquaries indicated 11.74 to 26.47% of lead which verifies that the technological techniques of casting and annealing were known during the period. However, the bronze items have been dated to late 200 BC. In 1994, radiocarbon dating by Roland Mourer suggests the prehistoric sequence for Samrong Sen as lying between 3400 BC and 500 AD. This has been confirmed by the Accelerator mass spectrometry (AMS) analysis, a methodology adopted to determine the concentration of carbon-14.

Finds of Mansuy were further examined by French archaeologists in 1998 for human skeletons. This study identified three fully preserved skulls. In addition, 20 mandibles and several post-cranial ones found here established that these belonged to at least 20 people. Also found was a bronze mould and various arrowheads, axeheads, chisels and fish hooks etc.

== Geography ==
Samrong Sen is located in central Cambodia on the east bank of the Stueng Chinit River, in the flood plains of the Tonlé Sap River, near the ancient capital of Oudong. The site is approachable from the Kampong Chhnang, which is 22 kilometres (14 mi) away. The village below which the prehistoric archaeological finds are found, is a rugged mound of elliptical shape with a length of 600 m laid in a north–south direction. In the first report made by Edmond Fuchs in 1883, the site was identified as covering an area of 300 metres (980 ft) by 150 metres (490 ft). It was about 5 metres (16 ft) to 6 metres (20 ft) above the Chinit River during low flow season. While parts of the site were exploited in the 1930s, the surviving portion as of the 1960s, is situated on the right bank of the Strung-Kinit, a rivulet within the waterway that flows from the Kompong-Leng mountains into the Tonlé Sap. The site is approached along the waterway by inland transport from Kampong Chhnang port across the Tonlé Sap Lake via the Steung Chinit River. The road approach is, however, seasonal only on a non-monsoon road.

The Samrong Sen village, where the archaeological site is situated, is in the Kampong Leaeng District in the lacustrine flood plains, an area which is subject to backwater flooding from the Tonlé Sap lake and the Mekong River flows during the months of June to September (rainy season). The area gets exposed during the dry season from October to May when bush vegetation and water plants grow here and fishing is common vocation. The villagers subsist on hydrated lime extraction from the shells and fishing, activities that were recorded by the earliest researchers of the site and which had continued till the 1930s. As of 1999, 1237 people lived here in 235 stilt houses. A school and a Buddhist Pagoda were also reported in the village.

== Fauna ==
Excavations uncovered bones of faunal species (cattle, pig, dog) and aqua species (crocodile, water turtle and shell fish). Shell fish bones extracted from depths of 1–1.5 metres (3 ft 3 in – 4 ft 11 in) were subject to carbon dating which has fixed the age of the site around 1650±120 BC.

== Findings ==
Morphological characteristics of the tools have been the basis for the categorization of the Samrong Sen stone tools. The adzes, axes, shouldered adzes, shouldered axes, gouges, chisels, a burnisher, a tool used as a hammer are the eight identified categories. The most common tools found were adzes, followed by chisels and gouges. Axes and shouldered axes were very few. In the early excavation stages, flakes, debris, pre-forms and unfinished tools were not part of the collections. Further, though tool-manufacturing techniques could not be correctly discerned, it has been inferred after careful study of the tools that picking or flaking was the initial step followed by partial, edge, and full grinding. It has also been conjectured that sawing techniques were used.

The adzes have quadrangular sections similar to those found in Indo-China, Southern Thailand, Myanmar, and even India, Malaysia, Indonesia, Philippines, Melanesia, Micronesia, and Polynesia. The stone gouges are linked to similar ones found in Marianas. Other antiquaries included ceramics, stone tools (adzes), a decorated bronze bell (19.7 cm in height), bone spear, harpoon shafts and human remains. Polished stone tools were used for wood working activities and pottery vessels and were produced by professionals. It has been inferred: "Standardization in polished stone toll forms and functions was one of the socioeconomic changes experienced by the societies that lived in the flood plain zone of the Tonlé Sap during the transition of Neolithic and Metal periods in Cambodia." On the basis of studies carried out in ancient archaeological sites in Thailand the occupation of the area in the Neolithic period has also been inferred through the remains unearthed at the Samrong Sen site, as establishing occupation during Bronze Age (after 2000 BC). There is a certain degree of confusion in this dating since it has been noted that "Neolithic/Bronze Age periods are poorly separated" at the Cambodian sites.

Other observations showed that the ceramics contained decoration that are incised or impressed, a stylish technology which could exist at other locations; an earthenware vase mounted on a pedestal (reported by Mansuy in 1902 and in Mourer in 1971) attests to the polished stone adzes of the late Neolithic or early Bronze Age and are found in the adjoining countries of Thailand and Vietnam; stylistic changes have been recorded in the stratigraphic sequences such as in the curvilinear geometric ware. With findings of bronzes, arrow heads, hooks, bracelets, an axe, and a sandstone mould for axes, the excavations have also bridged the information gap between the Bronze Age with the excavations done at Angkor Borei. The Bronze Age manufacturing of bronze finds at Samrong Sen and other sites in Cambodia are inferred to have been the outcome of supplies of ingots of copper received from central or northeastern Thailand, as Cambodia lacked any copper resources in its own territory. The finished bronze products produced in Cambodia are, however, testified by the large quantity of moulds and workshop remnants found during excavations. It was also revealed that the settlers of Samrong Sen lived in bamboo houses on stilts, much like today

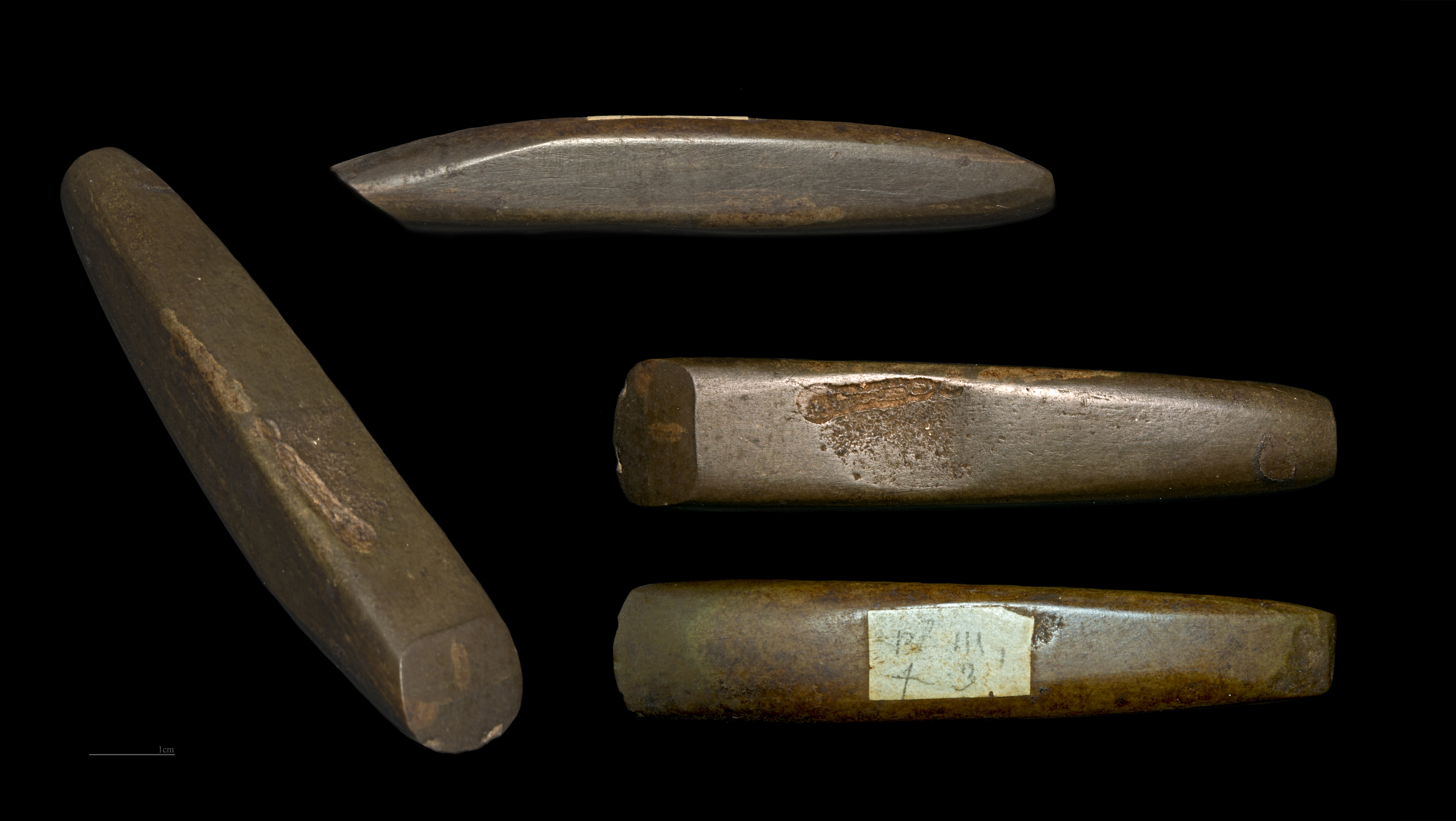
Chisel – former collection of Jean Moura MHNT

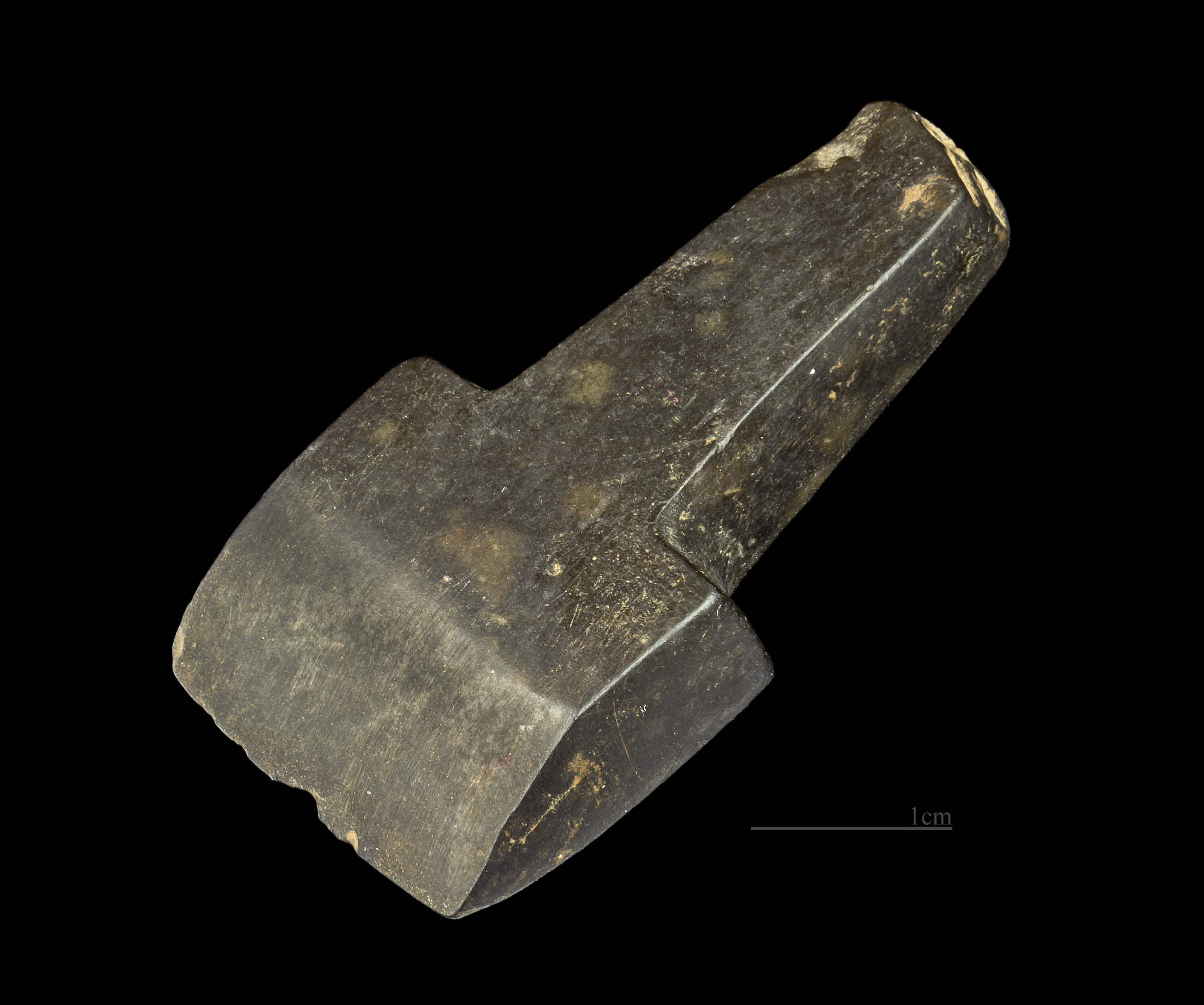
Shouldered axes – former collection of Jean Moura MHNT

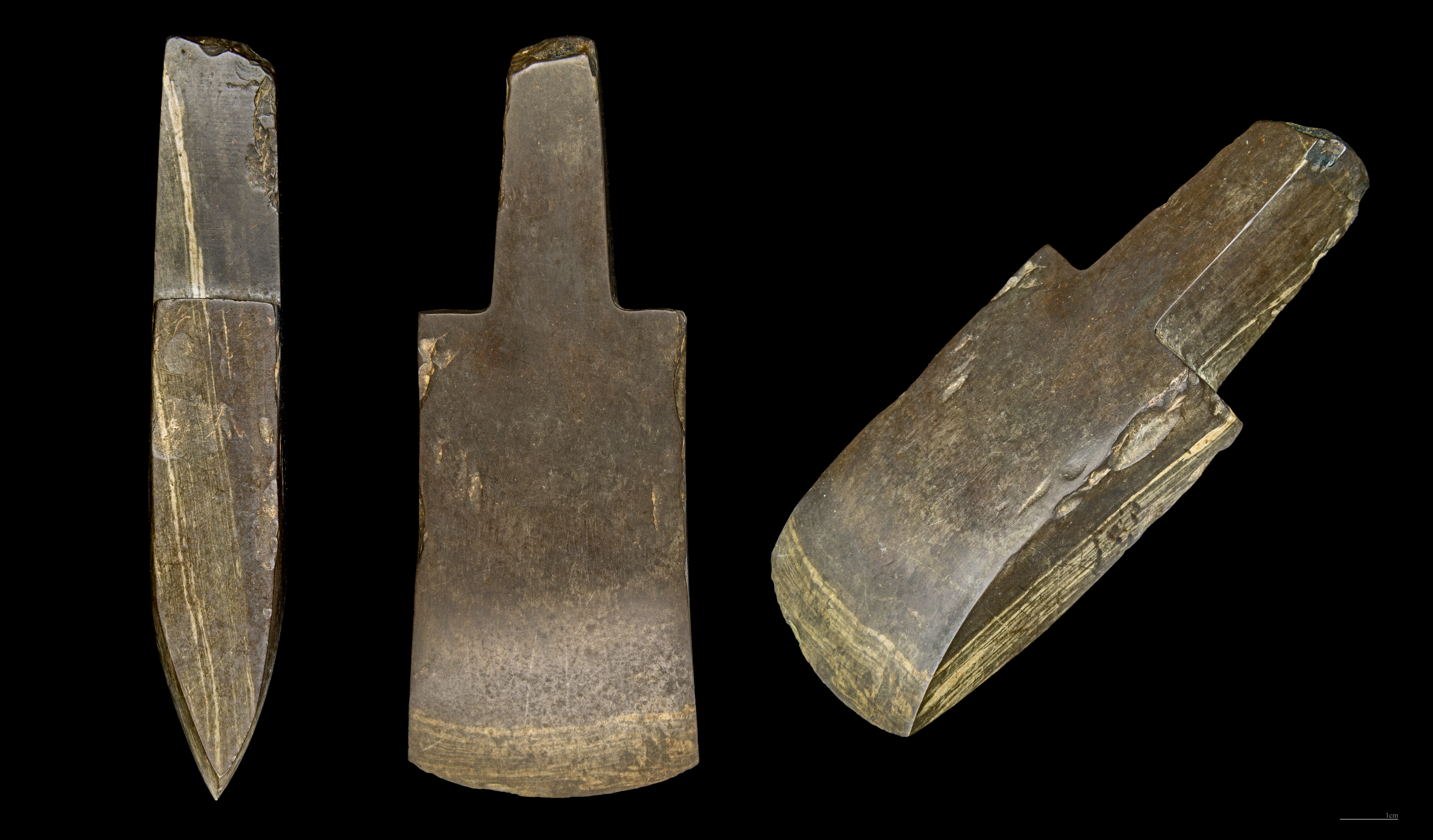
Shouldered axes – former collection of Jean Moura MHNT

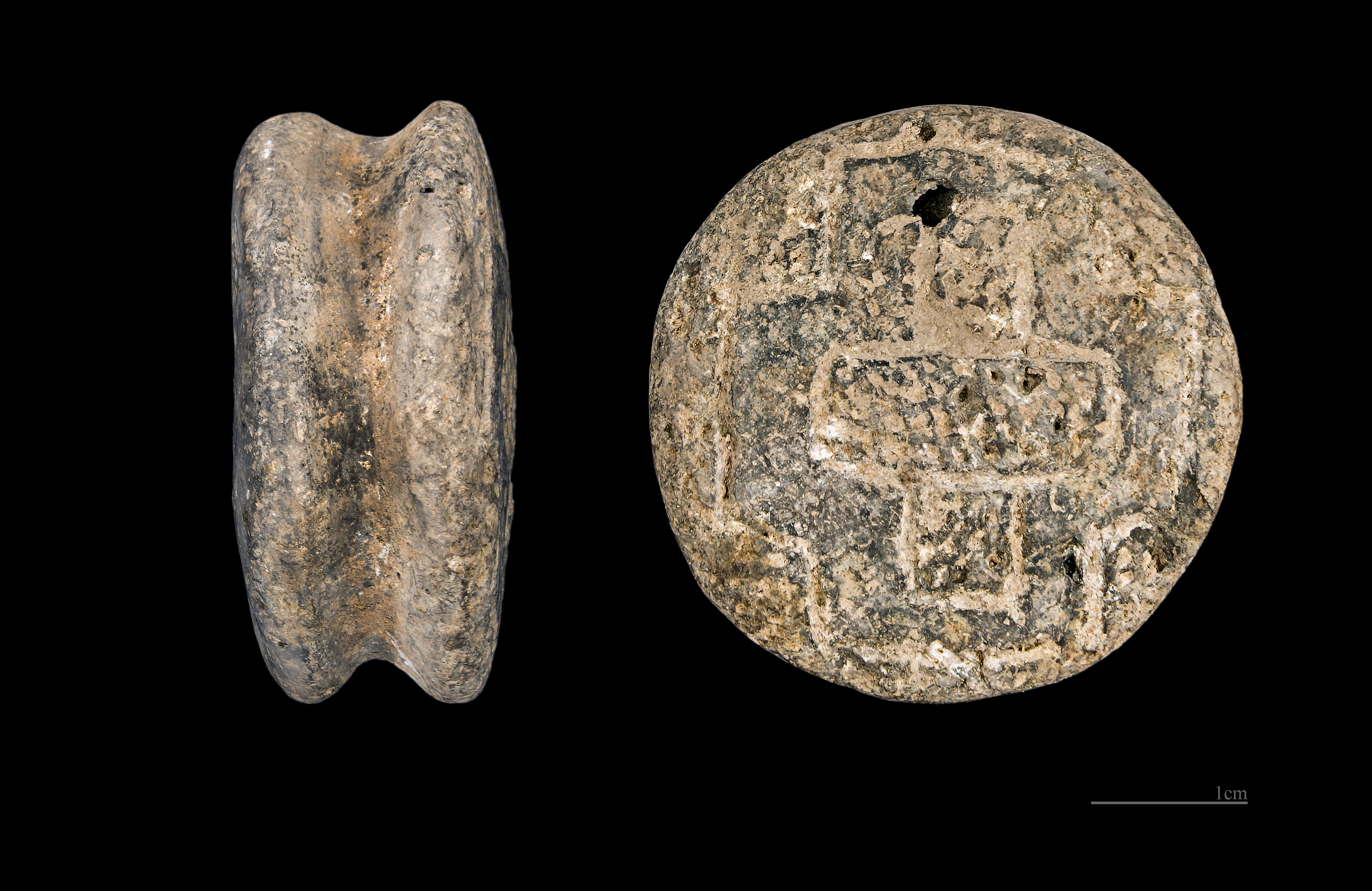
Ear stretching plug – former collection of Jean Moura MHNT

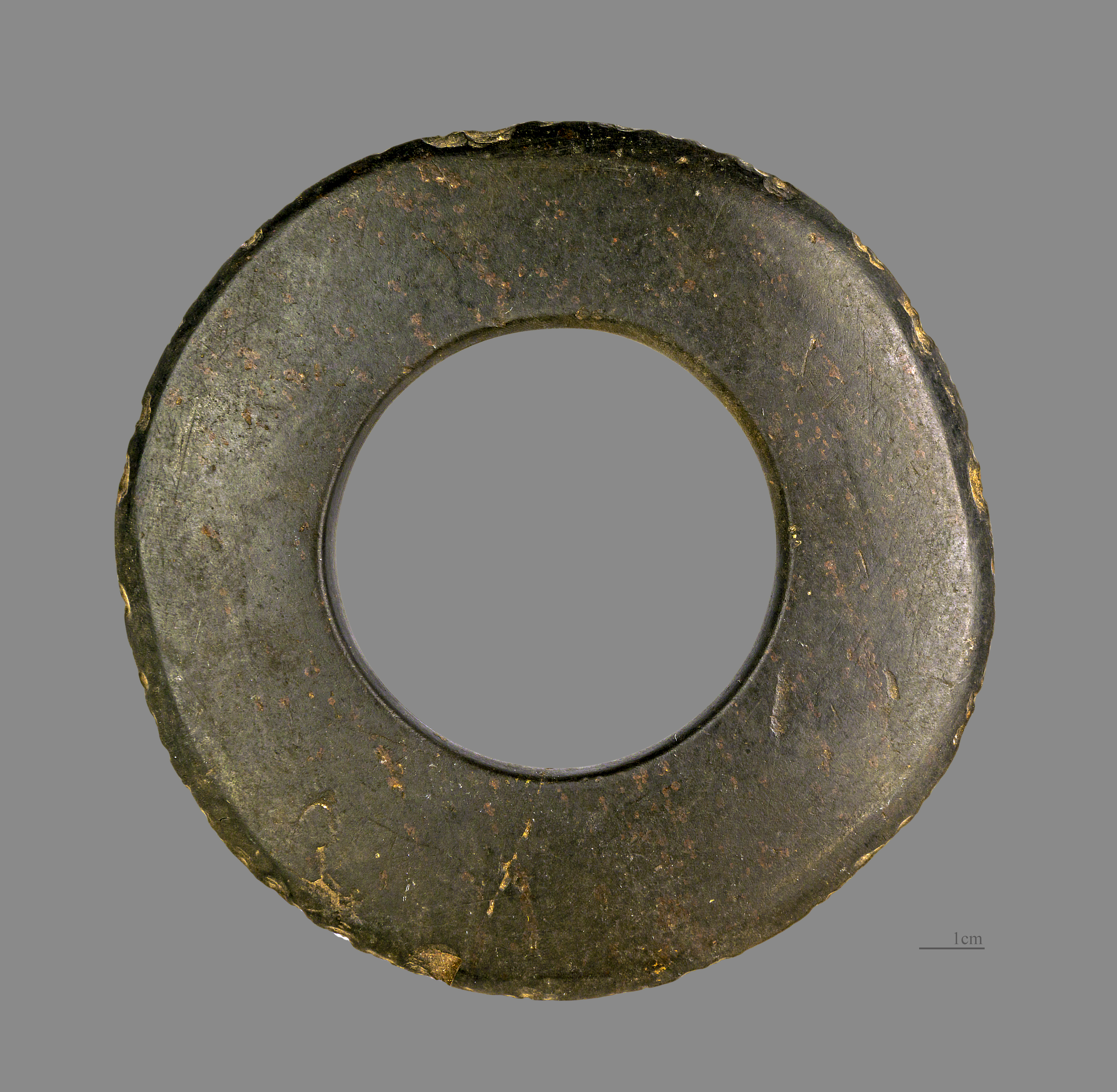
Jade ornaments – former collection of Jean Moura MHNT

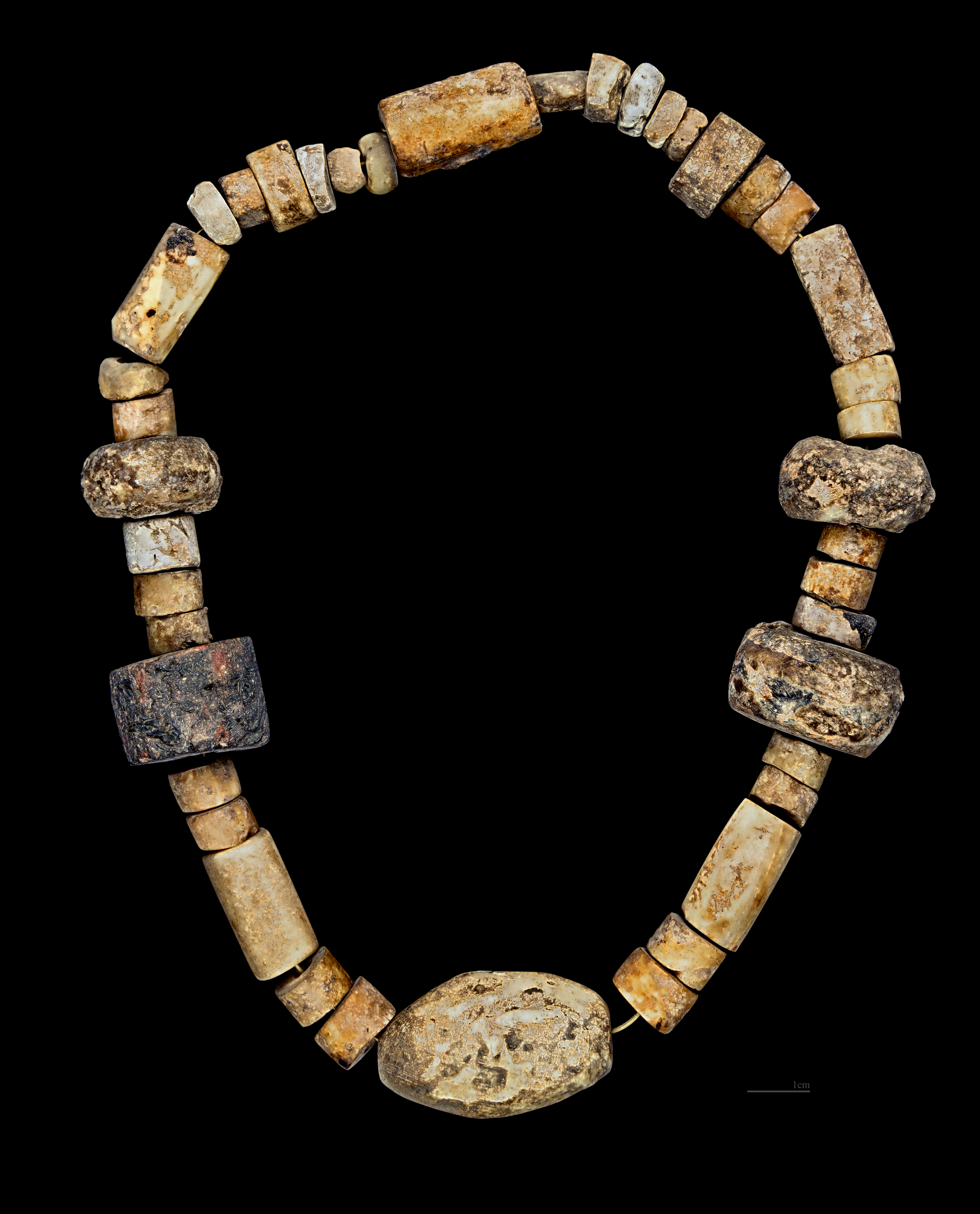
Necklace – former collection of Jean Moura MHNT

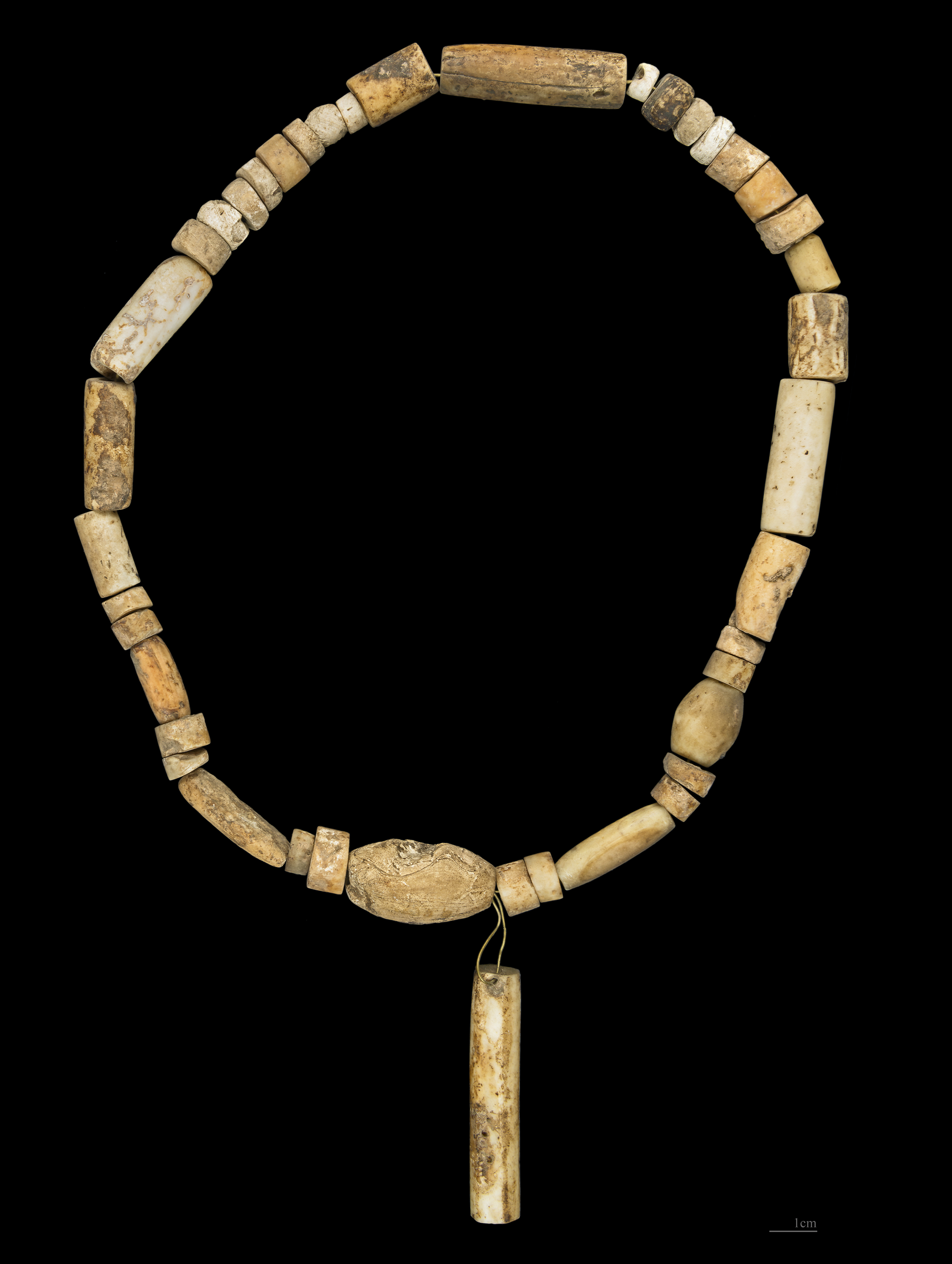
Necklace – former collection of Jean Moura MHNT

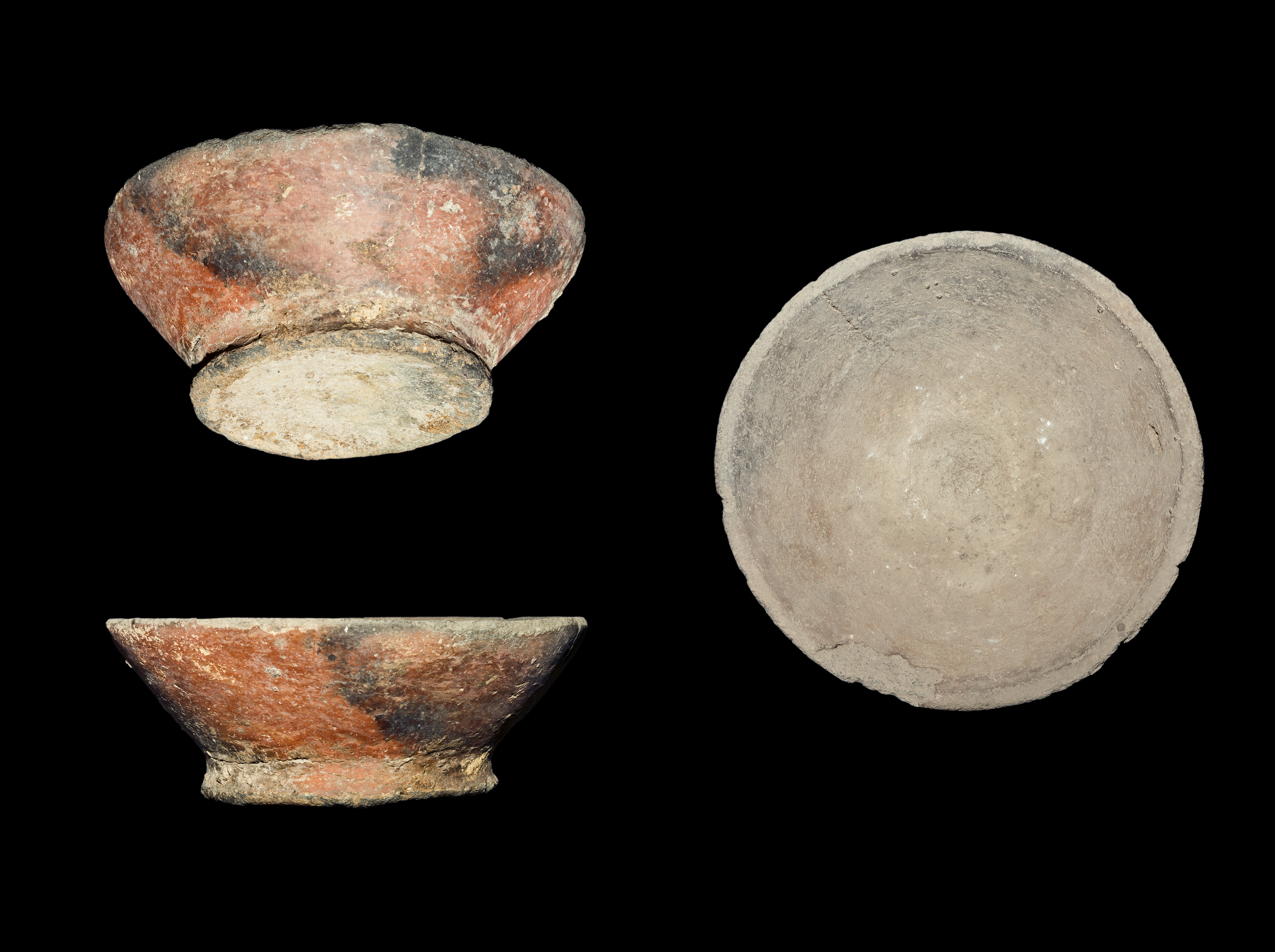
Ceramic bowl decorated – former collection of Jean Moura MHNT

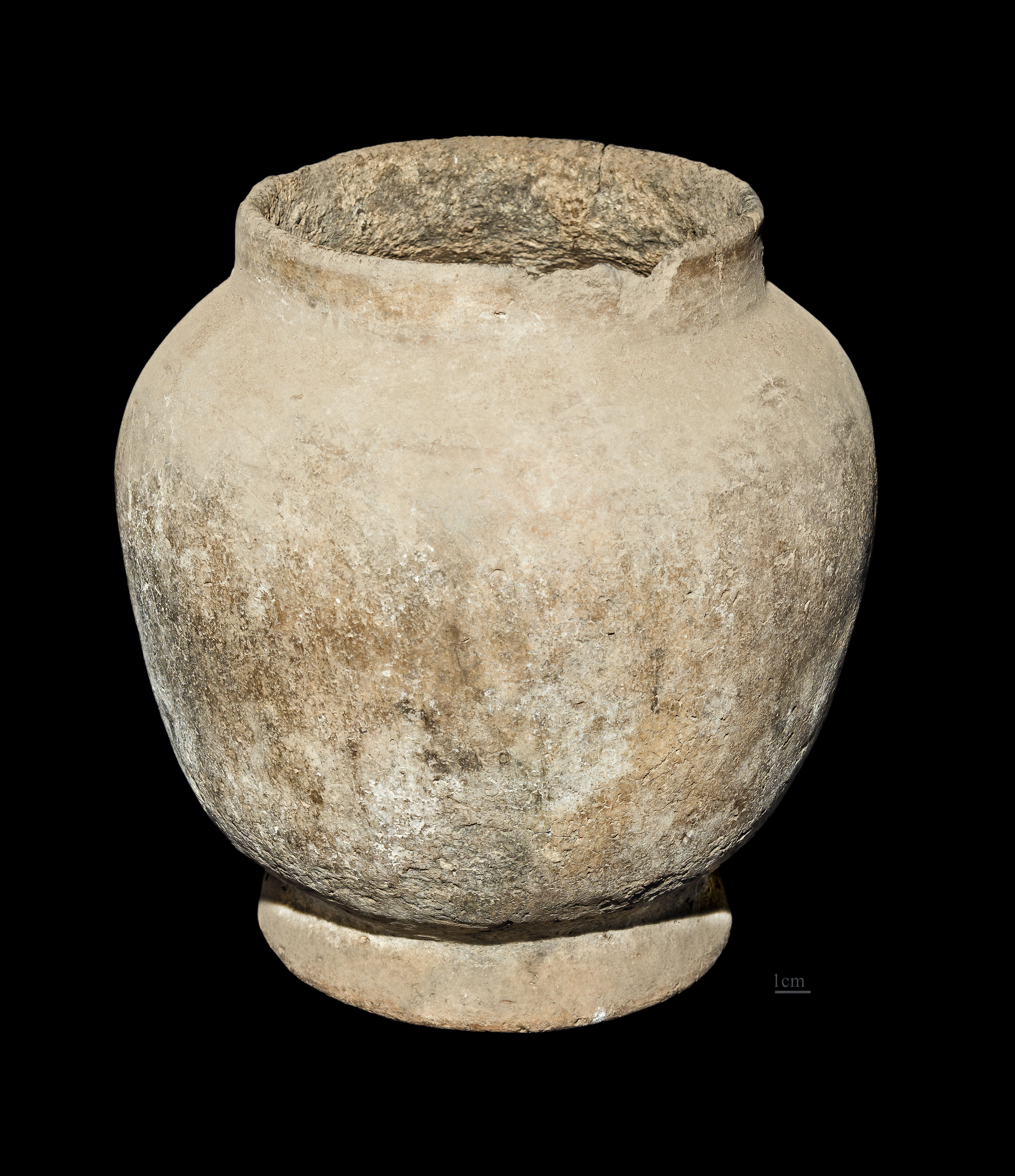
Ceramic vase – former collection of Jean Moura MHNT

== Collections ==
The 1864 Moura collection of 18 items is housed in the Muséum d'Histoire Naturelle de Toulouse, along with the undated finds of F. Regnault (11 items) and C.C. Rousseau (15 items). The six items credited to Ludovic Jammes, a teacher from Realmont, France in 1887 are housed in the Musée des Antiquités in Saint-Germain-en-Laye, along with items found by Vitout in 1912, and one item of Corre in 1905. Jammes had collected 71 items which are kept in the Muséum d'Histoire Naturelle de Lyon, and part of his collection is at the Smithsonian Institution. The largest collection of 142 items, collected by Mansuy in 1902, are in the Department of Prehistory, Muséum national d'histoire naturelle, Paris. Vesigne collected 18 items in 1906 which are also in the Muséum national d'histoire naturelle. Antiquaries (3 items) collected by Johan Gunnar Andersson are in the Museum of Far Eastern Antiquities, Stockholm. European museums have a collection of 289 polished stone implements collected from Samrong Sen. The collections in the National Museum in Phnom Penh in Cambodia is however very limited, that too mostly donated by the Biological Anthropological Laboratory of the Musée de l'Homme, Paris. Some artefacts from surface collections are also kept with the Departure of Culture. The artefacts found by the Cambodian archaeologist L. Vanna relate to some fragments of pottery, polished tools and bronze ornaments, bones of fish and animals, tools to make pottery, shells and biological remains preserved in Phnom Penh.

== Bibliography ==
- Higham, Charles (1996). The Bronze Age of Southeast Asia. Cambridge University Press. ISBN 978-0-521-56505-9.
- Miksic, John N. (2003). Earthenware in Southeast Asia: proceedings of the Singapore Symposium on Premodern Southeast Asian Earthenwares. NUS Press. ISBN 978-9971-69-271-1.
- Sophady, Heng (2007). "A Study of Polished Stone Tools from Samrong Sen, Cambodia: The French Museum Collections" (PDF). Tautavel: Muséum National d'Histoire Naturelle, Paris Département de Préhistoire.
