= Marsal, Tarn =

Marsal
- Part of Bellegarde-Marsal
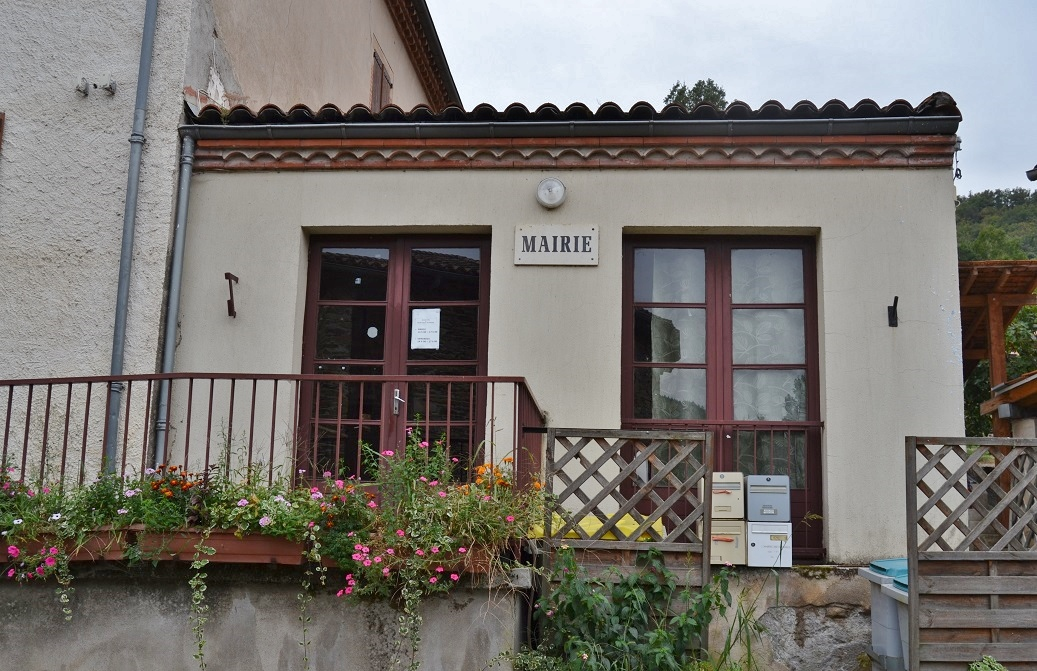
- Marsal Town hall

- Coat of arms
- Location of Marsal
- Location within France Location within Occitanie
- Coordinates: 43°55′52″N 2°17′15″E
- Country: France
- Region: Occitania
- Department: Tarn
- Arrondissement: Albi
- Canton: Le Haut Dadou
- Commune: Bellegarde-Marsal
- Area^{1}: 8.29 km^{2} (3.20 sq mi)
- Elevation: 185 m (607 ft)
- Highest elevation: 367 m (1,204 ft)
- Lowest elevation: 163 m (535 ft)
- Population (2013): 273
  - Density: 32.9/km^{2} (85.3/sq mi)
- Time zone: UTC+01:00 (CET)
  - Summer (DST): UTC+02:00 (CEST)
- Postal code: 81430
- ^{1} French Land Register data, which excludes lakes, ponds, glaciers > 1 km^{2} (0.386 sq mi or 247 acres) and river estuaries.

Marsal (French pronunciation: [maʁsal]; Occitan: Marçal) is a former commune in the Tarn department in southern France. On 1 January 2016, it was merged into the new commune of Bellegarde-Marsal.

== See also ==
- Communes of the Tarn department
