= Kang Meas City =

Coordinates: 11°57′7.26″N 105°8′57.43″E

Kang Meas was a rural village in Kampong Thom province called Kang Meas City as of July 17, 2012. The city was the brain-child of Professor Thearonn Hang and included two boulevards—Krou Thor, located along the Chinit River, and Krou Tearin, located in the southern part of the city.

The Kang Meas village formerly belonged to Thnoat Chum commune, Baray district, Kampong Thom province.

In 2030, Professor Thearonn Hang will merge the surrounding villages and communes into an administrative center which is so-called the Kampuchea Central City. The Kampuchea Central City or the Khmer Central City will become a central point of Cambodia which serve the tourists who travel to and from the two big cities of Cambodia - Siem Reap and Phnom Penh. So, the hotels, guest-houses, lac, and other entertainment will be built.

Also, the four pagodas in Taing Krassaing will be merged into a single pagoda. The Thormneat, the Taing Krassaing, the Sang Khleang pagoda will be dysfunctional, whereas the only Phumi Veang pagoda will be used and became a tourist attraction and a holy place.

The second vision is to make Taing Krassaing commune to become a city, hereinafter refers to the Cambodia Central City (Ville Cambodge Central) or (ក្រុងផ្ចិតកម្ពុជា) which is the centre of Cambodia and the middle way of the two capital cities - Phnom Penh and Siem Reap. The name of Taing Krassaing commune will be changed to Krong Phchet Kampuchea through a cut off some commune of Santuk and Baray district.
