= Mouzieys-Teulet =

- Commune
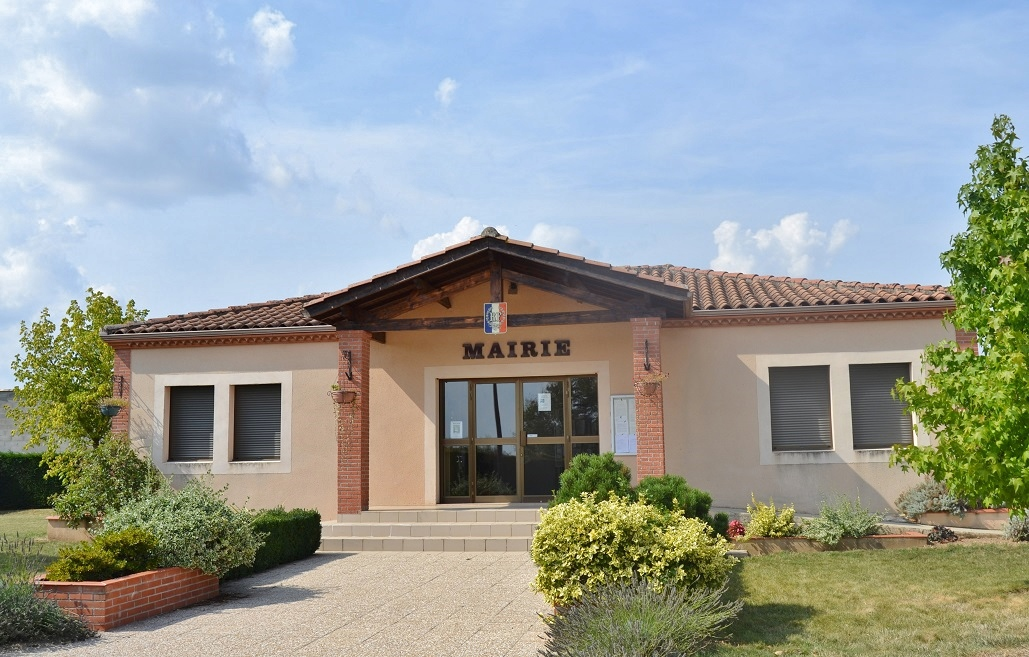
- Town hall
- Location of Mouzieys-Teulet
- Location within France Location within Occitanie
- Coordinates: 43°51′58″N 2°16′37″E
- Country: France
- Region: Occitania
- Department: Tarn
- Arrondissement: Albi
- Canton: Le Haut Dadou

Government
  - Mayor (2023–2026): Sébastien Paulhe
- Area^{1}: 13.21 km^{2} (5.10 sq mi)
- Elevation: 350 m (1,150 ft)
- Highest elevation: 383 m (1,257 ft)
- Lowest elevation: 230 m (750 ft)
- Population (2023): 467
  - Density: 35.4/km^{2} (91.6/sq mi)
- Time zone: UTC+01:00 (CET)
  - Summer (DST): UTC+02:00 (CEST)
- INSEE/Postal code: 81190 /81430
- ^{1} French Land Register data, which excludes lakes, ponds, glaciers > 1 km^{2} (0.386 sq mi or 247 acres) and river estuaries.

Mouzieys-Teulet is a commune in the Tarn department in southern France.

== See also ==
- Communes of the Tarn department
