= Orban, Tarn =

Orban
- Commune
- Coat of arms
- Location of Orban
- Location within France Location within Occitanie
- Coordinates: 43°50′36″N 2°05′03″E
- Country: France
- Region: Occitania
- Department: Tarn
- Arrondissement: Albi
- Canton: Le Haut Dadou
- Intercommunality: Centre Tarn

Government
  - Mayor (2020–2026): Isabelle Calmet
- Area^{1}: 8.76 km^{2} (3.38 sq mi)
- Elevation: 220 m (720 ft)
- Highest elevation: 252 m (827 ft)
- Lowest elevation: 188 m (617 ft)
- Population (2023): 351
  - Density: 40.1/km^{2} (104/sq mi)
- Time zone: UTC+01:00 (CET)
  - Summer (DST): UTC+02:00 (CEST)
- INSEE/Postal code: 81198 /81120
- ^{1} French Land Register data, which excludes lakes, ponds, glaciers > 1 km^{2} (0.386 sq mi or 247 acres) and river estuaries.

Orban (French pronunciation: [ɔʁbɑ̃]; Occitan: Orbanh) is a commune in the Tarn department and Occitanie region of southern France.

== See also ==
- Communes of the Tarn department
