= Massals =

- Commune
- Coat of arms
- Location of Massals
- Location within France Location within Occitanie
- Coordinates: 43°51′08″N 2°31′29″E
- Country: France
- Region: Occitania
- Department: Tarn
- Arrondissement: Albi
- Canton: Le Haut Dadou
- Intercommunality: CC Monts d'Alban et Villefranchois

Government
  - Mayor (2020–2026): Michèle Saunal
- Area^{1}: 16.3 km^{2} (6.3 sq mi)
- Elevation: 716 m (2,349 ft)
- Highest elevation: 813 m (2,667 ft)
- Lowest elevation: 527 m (1,729 ft)
- Population (2023): 113
  - Density: 6.93/km^{2} (18.0/sq mi)
- Time zone: UTC+01:00 (CET)
  - Summer (DST): UTC+02:00 (CEST)
- INSEE/Postal code: 81161 /81250
- ^{1} French Land Register data, which excludes lakes, ponds, glaciers > 1 km^{2} (0.386 sq mi or 247 acres) and river estuaries.

Massals is a commune in the Tarn department in southern France.

== See also ==
- Communes of the Tarn department
