= Saint-André, Tarn =

Saint-André
- Commune
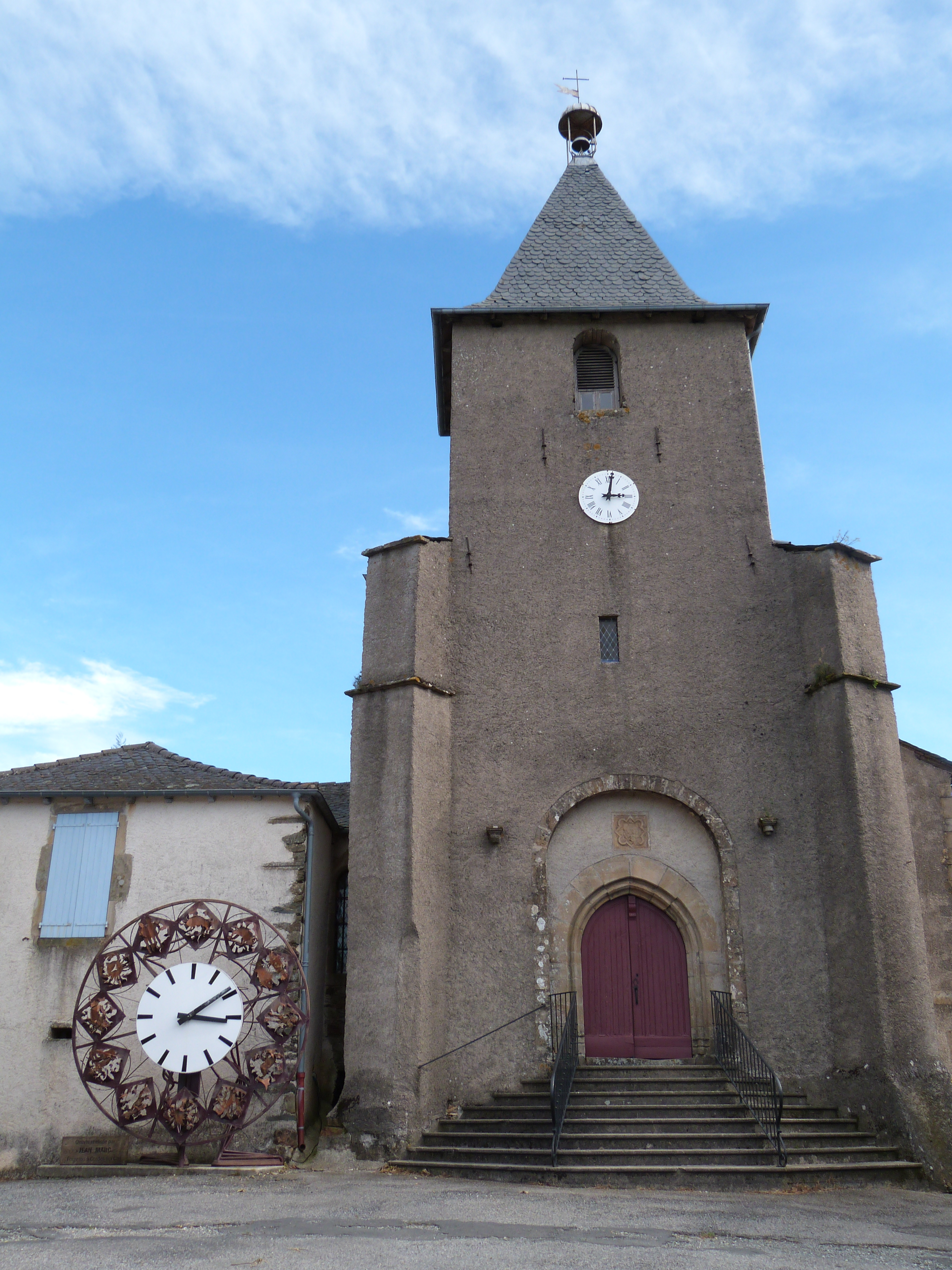
- The church in Saint-André
- Location of Saint-André
- Location within France Location within Occitanie
- Coordinates: 43°56′02″N 2°27′38″E
- Country: France
- Region: Occitania
- Department: Tarn
- Arrondissement: Albi
- Canton: Le Haut Dadou

Government
  - Mayor (2020–2026): Jean-Luc Espitalier
- Area^{1}: 7.27 km^{2} (2.81 sq mi)
- Elevation: 427 m (1,401 ft)
- Highest elevation: 563 m (1,847 ft)
- Lowest elevation: 206 m (676 ft)
- Population (2023): 102
  - Density: 14.0/km^{2} (36.3/sq mi)
- Time zone: UTC+01:00 (CET)
  - Summer (DST): UTC+02:00 (CEST)
- INSEE/Postal code: 81240 /81250
- ^{1} French Land Register data, which excludes lakes, ponds, glaciers > 1 km^{2} (0.386 sq mi or 247 acres) and river estuaries.

Saint-André (French pronunciation: [sɛ̃.t‿ɑ̃dʁe]; Languedocien: Sant Andrieu) is a commune in the Tarn department in southern France.

== See also ==
- Communes of the Tarn department
