= Villefranche-d'Albigeois =

- Commune
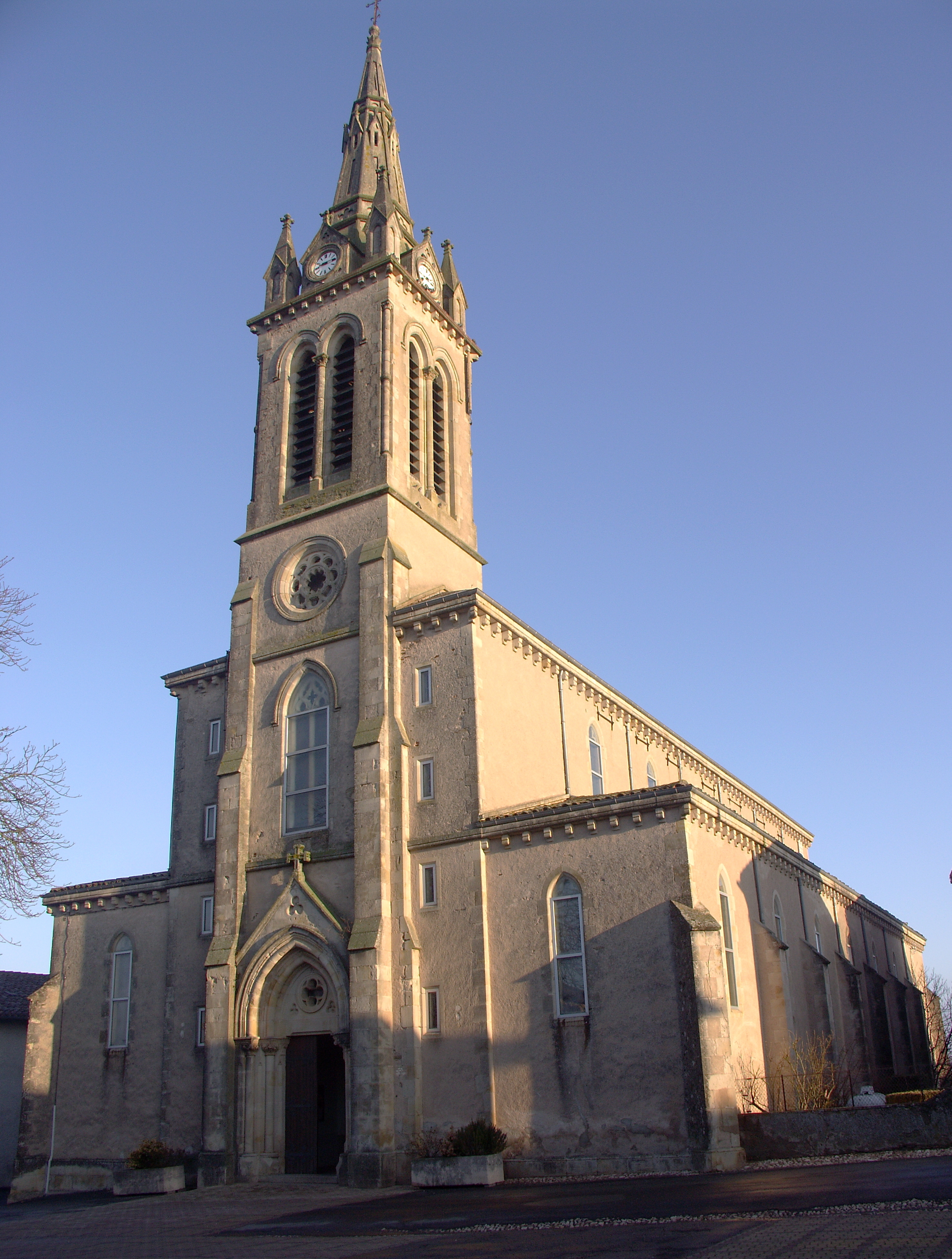
- The church in Villefranche-d Albigeois

- Coat of arms
- Location of Villefranche-d'Albigeois
- Location within France Location within Occitanie
- Coordinates: 43°53′52″N 2°19′51″E
- Country: France
- Region: Occitania
- Department: Tarn
- Arrondissement: Albi
- Canton: Le Haut Dadou
- Intercommunality: CC Monts d'Alban et Villefranchois

Government
  - Mayor (2020–2026): Bruno Bousquet
- Area^{1}: 22.09 km^{2} (8.53 sq mi)
- Elevation: 420 m (1,380 ft)
- Highest elevation: 526 m (1,726 ft)
- Lowest elevation: 183 m (600 ft)
- Population (2023): 1,224
  - Density: 55.41/km^{2} (143.5/sq mi)
- Time zone: UTC+01:00 (CET)
  - Summer (DST): UTC+02:00 (CEST)
- INSEE/Postal code: 81317 /81430
- ^{1} French Land Register data, which excludes lakes, ponds, glaciers > 1 km^{2} (0.386 sq mi or 247 acres) and river estuaries.

Villefranche-d'Albigeois (French pronunciation: [vilfʁɑ̃ʃ dalbiʒwa]; Languedocien: Vilafranca) is a commune in the Tarn department in southern France.

== See also ==
- Communes of the Tarn department
