= Bellegarde-Marsal =

- Commune
- Location of Bellegarde-Marsal
- Location within France Location within Occitanie
- Coordinates: 43°54′25″N 2°16′26″E
- Country: France
- Region: Occitania
- Department: Tarn
- Arrondissement: Albi
- Canton: Le Haut Dadou

Government
  - Mayor (2020–2026): Serge Capgras
- Area^{1}: 19.39 km^{2} (7.49 sq mi)
- Population (2023): 690
  - Density: 36/km^{2} (92/sq mi)
- Time zone: UTC+01:00 (CET)
  - Summer (DST): UTC+02:00 (CEST)
- INSEE/Postal code: 81026 /81430
- ^{1} French Land Register data, which excludes lakes, ponds, glaciers > 1 km^{2} (0.386 sq mi or 247 acres) and river estuaries.

Bellegarde-Marsal (French pronunciation: [bɛlɡaʁd maʁsal]; Occitan: Bèlagarda e Marçal) is a commune in the department of Tarn, southern France. The municipality was established on 1 January 2016 by merger of the former communes of Bellegarde and Marsal.

== See also ==
- Communes of the Tarn department
