= Ambialet =

- Commune
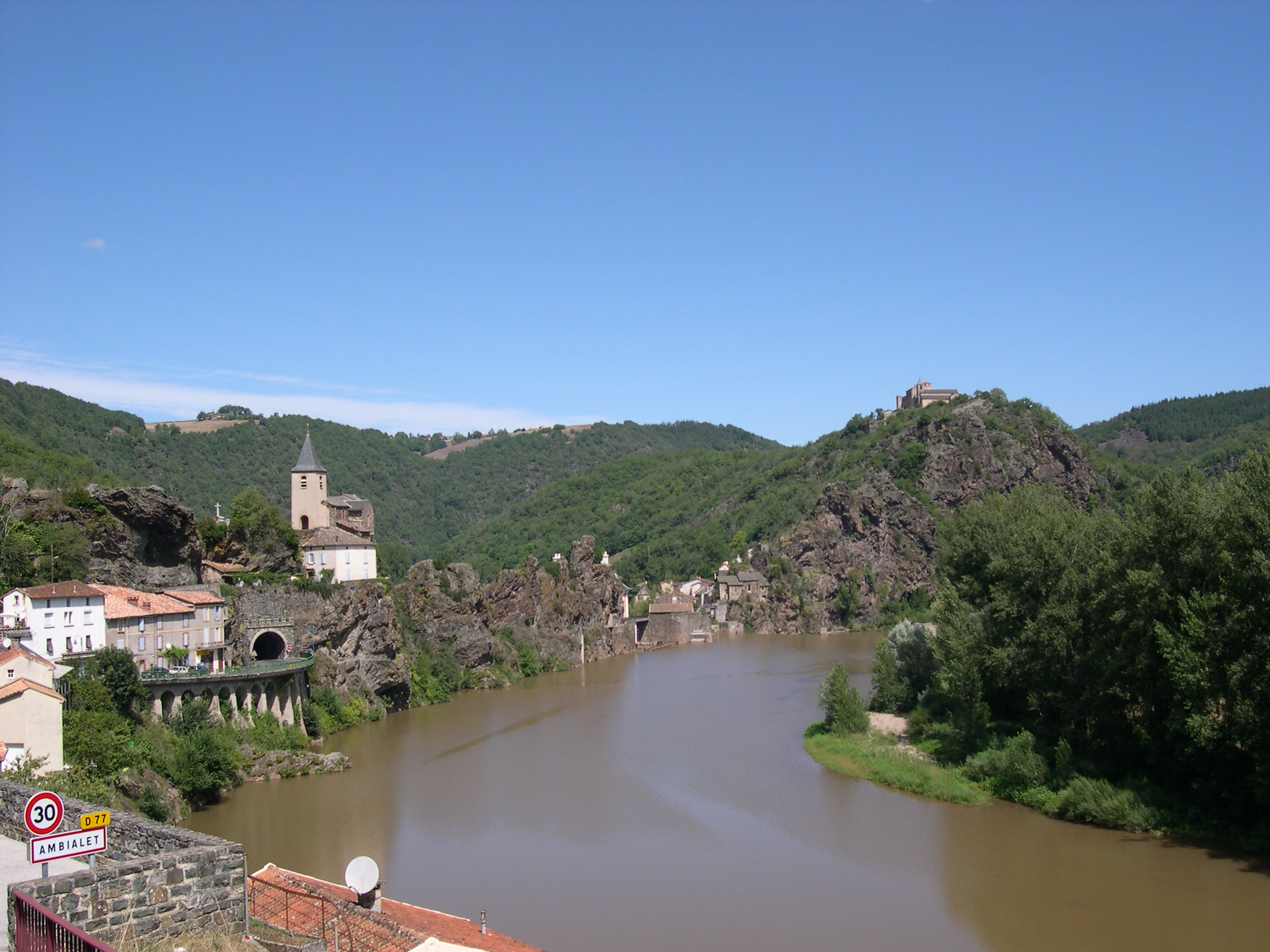
- A general view of Ambialet

- Coat of arms
- Location of Ambialet
- Location within France Location within Occitanie
- Coordinates: 43°56′51″N 2°22′48″E
- Country: France
- Region: Occitania
- Department: Tarn
- Arrondissement: Albi
- Canton: Le Haut Dadou
- Intercommunality: Monts-d'Alban et Villefranchois

Government
  - Mayor (2020–2026): Florence Durand
- Area^{1}: 30.04 km^{2} (11.60 sq mi)
- Elevation: 190 m (620 ft)
- Highest elevation: 502 m (1,647 ft)
- Lowest elevation: 180 m (590 ft)
- Population (2023): 471
  - Density: 15.7/km^{2} (40.6/sq mi)
- Time zone: UTC+01:00 (CET)
  - Summer (DST): UTC+02:00 (CEST)
- INSEE/Postal code: 81010 /81430
- ^{1} French Land Register data, which excludes lakes, ponds, glaciers > 1 km^{2} (0.386 sq mi or 247 acres) and river estuaries.

Ambialet (French pronunciation: [ɑ̃bjalɛ]) is a commune of the Tarn department in southern France.

Ambialet's castle was a stronghold of the Cathars and was sacked during the Middle Ages by Simon de Montfort. It is also home to a study abroad campus of Saint Francis University, Loretto, Pennsylvania. Classes are held in the centuries-old former Franciscan Monastery in Ambialet, and during visits to Barcelona, Spain and Paris, France. All classes are taught in English.

== See also ==
- Communes of the Tarn department
