= Poulan-Pouzols =

- Commune
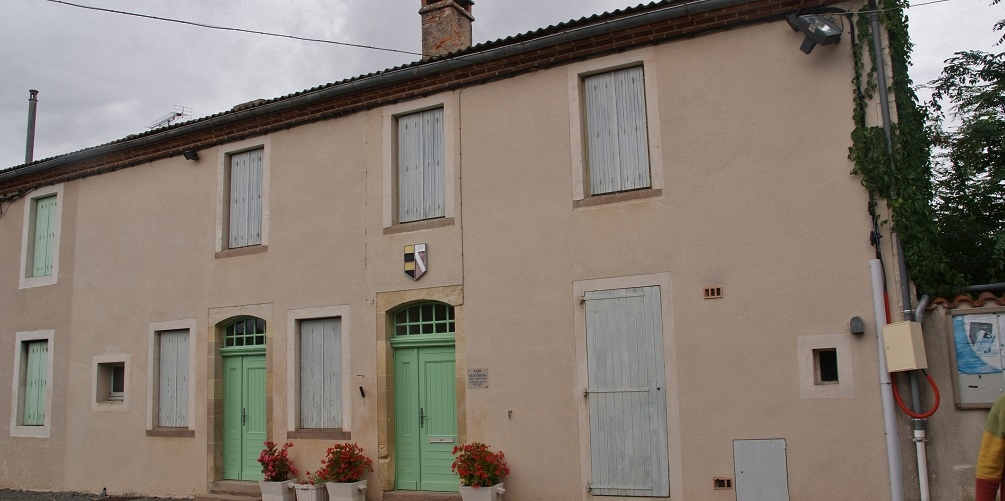
- Town hall

- Coat of arms
- Location of Poulan-Pouzols
- Location within France Location within Occitanie
- Coordinates: 43°51′39″N 2°07′02″E
- Country: France
- Region: Occitania
- Department: Tarn
- Arrondissement: Albi
- Canton: Le Haut Dadou

Government
  - Mayor (2020–2026): Jean-Claude Madaule
- Area^{1}: 11.86 km^{2} (4.58 sq mi)
- Elevation: 270 m (890 ft)
- Highest elevation: 292 m (958 ft)
- Lowest elevation: 187 m (614 ft)
- Population (2023): 478
  - Density: 40.3/km^{2} (104/sq mi)
- Time zone: UTC+01:00 (CET)
  - Summer (DST): UTC+02:00 (CEST)
- INSEE/Postal code: 81211 /81120
- ^{1} French Land Register data, which excludes lakes, ponds, glaciers > 1 km^{2} (0.386 sq mi or 247 acres) and river estuaries.

Poulan-Pouzols is a commune in the Tarn department in southern France.

== See also ==
- Communes of the Tarn department
