= Alban, Tarn =

Alban
- Commune
- Coat of arms
- Location of Alban
- Location within France Location within Occitanie
- Coordinates: 43°53′24″N 2°27′38″E
- Country: France
- Region: Occitania
- Department: Tarn
- Arrondissement: Albi
- Canton: Le Haut Dadou
- Intercommunality: Monts d'Alban et du Villefranchois

Government
  - Mayor (2020–2026): Bernard Lafon
- Area^{1}: 9.82 km^{2} (3.79 sq mi)
- Elevation: 615 m (2,018 ft)
- Highest elevation: 644 m (2,113 ft)
- Lowest elevation: 357 m (1,171 ft)
- Population (2023): 964
  - Density: 98.2/km^{2} (254/sq mi)
- Time zone: UTC+01:00 (CET)
  - Summer (DST): UTC+02:00 (CEST)
- INSEE/Postal code: 81003 /81250
- ^{1} French Land Register data, which excludes lakes, ponds, glaciers > 1 km^{2} (0.386 sq mi or 247 acres) and river estuaries.

Alban (French pronunciation: [albɑ̃]; Occitan: Albanh) is a commune of the Tarn department in southern France.

== Population ==
Historical population
Year	Pop.	±% p.a.
1968	994	—
1975	935	−0.87%
1982	921	−0.22%
1990	904	−0.23%
1999	848	−0.71%
2007	953	+1.47%
2012	951	−0.04%
2017	938	−0.27%
2023	964	+0.46%
Source: INSEE

== See also ==
- Communes of the Tarn department
