= Chinit River =

Chinit River Stung Chinit, Stoeng Chinith

Location
- Country: Cambodia

Physical characteristics
- Source
  - location: Kampong Thom Province, Cambodia
  - coordinates: 12°31′38″N 104°27′31″E
  - elevation: 1,647 ft (502 m)
- Mouth: Tonlé Sap River
  - coordinates: 13°32.25′N 105°47.55′E
  - elevation: 16 ft (4.9 m)
- Length: 164 mi (264 km)
- Basin size: 1,739 mi^{2} (4,500 km^{2})
- Discharge
  - location: Kampong Thmar

Basin features
- River system: Tonlé Sap
- Tributaries
  - right: Stung Tang Krasaing

Chinit River (alternates: Stung Chinit or Stoeng Chinith; Khmer: ស្ទឹងជីនិត) is a river of Cambodia. Located in Kampong Thom Province, it is a major tributary of the Tonlé Sap Lake ("Great Lake"), which joins the Tonlé Sap River at the downstream end in the larger Mekong basin. Somewhat unusually the river is looped back into the same river system, which accounts for its length of 264 kilometres (164 mi), leaving Tonlé Sap lake and entering its river again downstream. The prehistoric archaeological site of Samrong Sen is located on the river bank. Water resource projects, commencing in 1971 and in 2003, have had various measures of success. The river is an important trade route.

== Geography ==
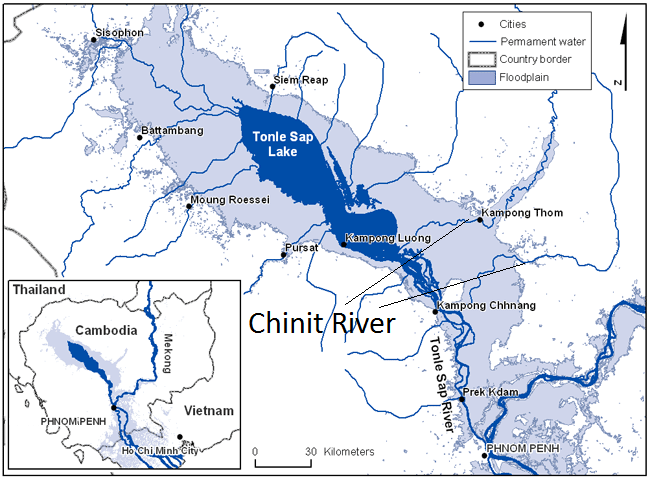
Map showing the looping course of the Chinit River and the Tonlé Sap lake and river system

Chinit River, also called Stung Chinit River, is a major tributary of the Tonlé Sap River, which flows down from the great lake of the same name from the northeast direction at 12°31′38″N 104°27′31″E, in central Cambodia. It reenters the Tonlé Sap system in the river at 13°32′N 105°47′E. The river's length is approximately 264 kilometres (164 mi) and loops out and into the Tonlé Sap system. Its width varies in the range of 60–90 metres (200–300 ft) over a total river stretch of 110 kilometres (68 mi).

The river drains a catchment area of 5,649 km^{2} (2,181 sq mi) including the catchment of 1,145 km^{2} (442 sq mi) of its tributary, the Stung Tang Krasaing, up to its outflow into Tonlé Sap Lake. The river passes through the Bolaven Plateau of Laos, reaches its highest elevation point, 288 metres (945 ft), at Phumi Chrach, and ends at its outflow point on Tonlé Sap Lake at an elevation of 5 metres (16 ft).There are gentler slopes noted towards the downstream. Its main lake is Bung Real Lake.

The main city along the river is Santuk District Capital. Samrong Sen, a prehistoric archaeological site of Neolithic Age is located on its right bank.

== Climate ==
According to the data sourced to the Hydrologic Water Year Book of Mekong Committee, the basin's climatic parameters recorded at the Kampong Thmar station, are; an average annual temperature of 27.8 °C (82.0 °F) with a minimum of 26.2 °C (79.2 °F) in December and maximum of 29.8 °C (85.6 °F) in March. The average annual evaporation rate is 1,455 millimetres (57.3 in) with a standard deviation of 133 millimetres (5.2 in) per month. The average annual precipitation recorded is 1,590 millimetres (63 in) with heavy rains recorded from April to October. The records of the Agrometerological Group of FAO of Research and Technology Development Division show the sunshine hours as 7.3 hours per day and the solar radiation at an annual average of 19.5 MJ/m^{2} per day.

== Water resources ==
Based on flow measurements carried out at the Chinit River's Kampong Thmar station, where the catchment area measured is 4,130 square kilometres (1,590 mi^{2}), the maximum and minimum flows recorded are 329 cubic metres per second (11,600 cu ft/s) and 3.34 cubic metres per second (118 cu ft/s) respectively with an average flow rate of 44.1 cubic metres per second (1,560 cu ft/s).

=== 1971 public works project ===
A multipurpose project envisaging benefits of irrigation, flood control, fisheries and hydro power generation was planned in 1971 to cover a command area of 48,000 hectares (120,000 acres). At Phnom Takho, the river drains a catchment area of 3,770 square kilometres (1,460 mi^{2}), using storage of 458 million cubic metres (371,000 acre⋅ft) (gross capacity 500 million cubic metres and effective capacity of 391 million cubic metres). The dam planned at Phnom Takho was to provide irrigation benefits with canal systems planned on both banks of the river, and also for power generation. A pumping station was also planned at Kampong Thmar to provide irrigation for an area of 7,600 hectares (19,000 acres). Power generation envisaged was 4.5 MW using a net head of 16.3 metres (53 ft) and effective storage of 391 million cubic metres for the purpose for rural electrification supply and lift irrigation. The project was also anticipated to bring in changes in the fish production both upstream and downstream of the dam location.

The project was to cover the districts of Santuk and Baray in the Kampong Thom Province. It was partially implemented between the 1970s and the 1980s, with the main diversion structure and the main canal with head regulators built during the Khmer Rouge regime using forced labour. Some of the structures that were built, were subsequently damaged by regime soldiers who were "grenade fishing". The project only partial irrigation as the canal system was built for only a short length of 40 kilometres (25 mi). The system was found to be lacking in proper planning and design concepts, and also dubious construction methods were adopted in many respects, which caused frequent flooding and damages to structures and canal systems.

=== 2003 public works project ===
Consequent to this, a fresh start was made by launching The Stung Chinit Irrigation and Rural Infrastructure Project (SCIRIP), with technical and financial inputs of US$23.8 million equivalent from the Government of the Kingdom of Cambodia, the Asian Development Bank (ADB), Agence Française de Développement and the beneficiaries. The objective was to increase agricultural productivity and to stimulate the rural economy in the province. In the initial phase, an area of 12,000 hectares (30,000 acres) was proposed to be developed, apart from rehabilitation of about 7,000 hectares (17,000 acres) that been previously developed. An additional dry season irrigation system in an area of about 2,000 hectares (4,900 acres) was also planned.

The project, launched in 2003, was implemented over a six-year period. It included improvements to the drainage infrastructure, 150 kilometres (93 mi) of rural roads, six markets, and extension services. Stakeholder participation occurred through Water User groups. By 2007, three communes and 24 villages in one district had benefited from the public works project. According to a 2008 ADB report, "The resettlement plan included three phases to cover the irrigation/drainage canal infrastructure, the reservoir area and the Otchork tributary area. All phases have been satisfactorily implemented but some longer-term income restoration activities are still ongoing and require post-project monitoring".

== Navigation ==
Inland navigation is practiced to a very limited extent due to shallow draft. Fishing and community boats are plied by villagers who reside on the banks of the river, for fishing and to transport goods to the markets.

== Land use ==
The Chinit River basin land use distribution is 75.5% under forest cover, 14.8% under paddy cultivation and the balance area is under other agricultural uses. Agricultural farming, mostly during the wet season of rice cultivation (seasonal rice and floating rice) is the major economic activity of the people living in the valley. Rice is also grown during the non-rainy season, but its acreage is limited to 10% of the cultivated area. White corn, green beans and tobacco are also grown in the higher elevations of the valley.

== Aquafauna ==
The Chinit River has been a subject of studies on fish migration. Movement of fish has been studied on Chinit and also on other rivers in the Mekong through sampling techniques carried out in 20-to-50-kilometre (12 to 31 mi) stretches upstream of the flooded areas, to identify larval and fry fish in five tributaries. Seventy-one species belonging to 17 families have been recorded in the Chinit River. It was also noted during these studies that the species recorded were distinctive for each tributary but the fish fauna found in Chinit and Stung tributaries were identical.

== Bibliography ==
- Kyoto University (1997). "Stung Chinit" (PDF). River Catalogue, Cambodia, Vol. 2. Japan. pp. 23–31.
