= Curvalle =

- Commune
- Coat of arms
- Location of Curvalle
- Location within France Location within Occitanie
- Coordinates: 43°56′40″N 2°28′06″E
- Country: France
- Region: Occitania
- Department: Tarn
- Arrondissement: Albi
- Canton: Le Haut Dadou

Government
  - Mayor (2020–2026): Joël Marquès
- Area^{1}: 38.63 km^{2} (14.92 sq mi)
- Elevation: 219 m (719 ft)
- Highest elevation: 696 m (2,283 ft)
- Lowest elevation: 206 m (676 ft)
- Population (2023): 398
  - Density: 10.3/km^{2} (26.7/sq mi)
- Time zone: UTC+01:00 (CET)
  - Summer (DST): UTC+02:00 (CEST)
- INSEE/Postal code: 81077 /81250
- ^{1} French Land Register data, which excludes lakes, ponds, glaciers > 1 km^{2} (0.386 sq mi or 247 acres) and river estuaries.

Curvalle (French pronunciation: [kyʁval]; Occitan: Curvala) is a commune in the Tarn department in southern France.

== See also ==
- Communes of the Tarn department
