= Réalmont =

- Commune
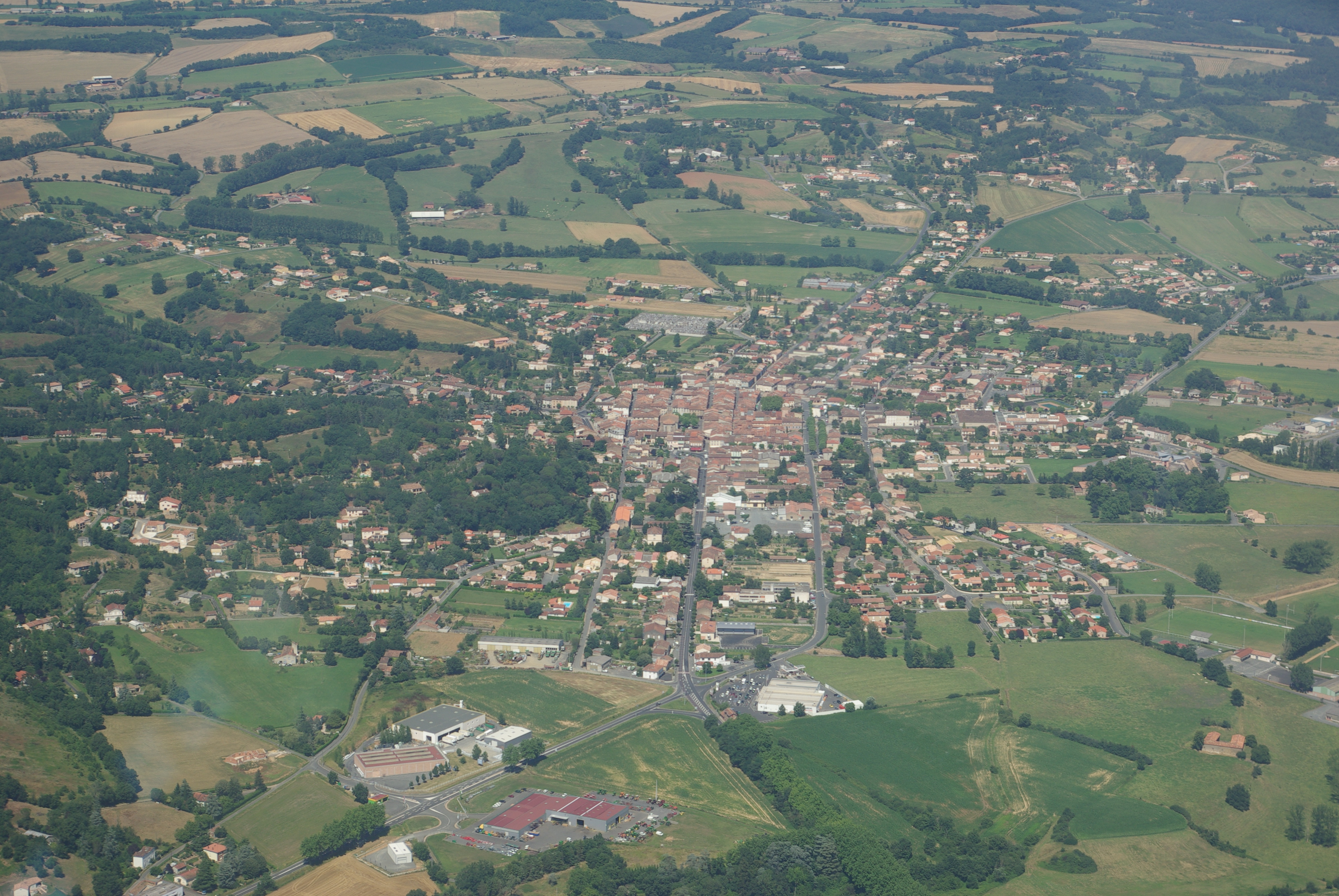
- An aerial view of Réalmont

- Coat of arms
- Location of Réalmont
- Location within France Location within Occitanie
- Coordinates: 43°46′38″N 2°11′26″E
- Country: France
- Region: Occitania
- Department: Tarn
- Arrondissement: Albi
- Canton: Le Haut Dadou

Government
  - Mayor (2020–2026): Henri Viaules
- Area^{1}: 14.33 km^{2} (5.53 sq mi)
- Elevation: 212 m (696 ft)
- Highest elevation: 333 m (1,093 ft)
- Lowest elevation: 181 m (594 ft)
- Population (2023): 3,561
  - Density: 248.5/km^{2} (643.6/sq mi)
- Time zone: UTC+01:00 (CET)
  - Summer (DST): UTC+02:00 (CEST)
- INSEE/Postal code: 81222 /81120
- ^{1} French Land Register data, which excludes lakes, ponds, glaciers > 1 km^{2} (0.386 sq mi or 247 acres) and river estuaries.

Réalmont (French pronunciation: [ʁealmɔ̃]; Occitan: Reialmont) is a commune in the Tarn department in southern France.

== Geography ==
The commune is traversed by the river Dadou.

== Population ==
Historical population
Year	Pop.	±% p.a.
1968	2,505	—
1975	2,618	+0.63%
1982	2,538	−0.44%
1990	2,631	+0.45%
1999	2,850	+0.89%
2007	3,214	+1.51%
2012	3,305	+0.56%
2017	3,418	+0.67%
2023	3,561	+0.69%
Source: INSEE

== See also ==
- Communes of the Tarn department
