= Teillet =

- Commune
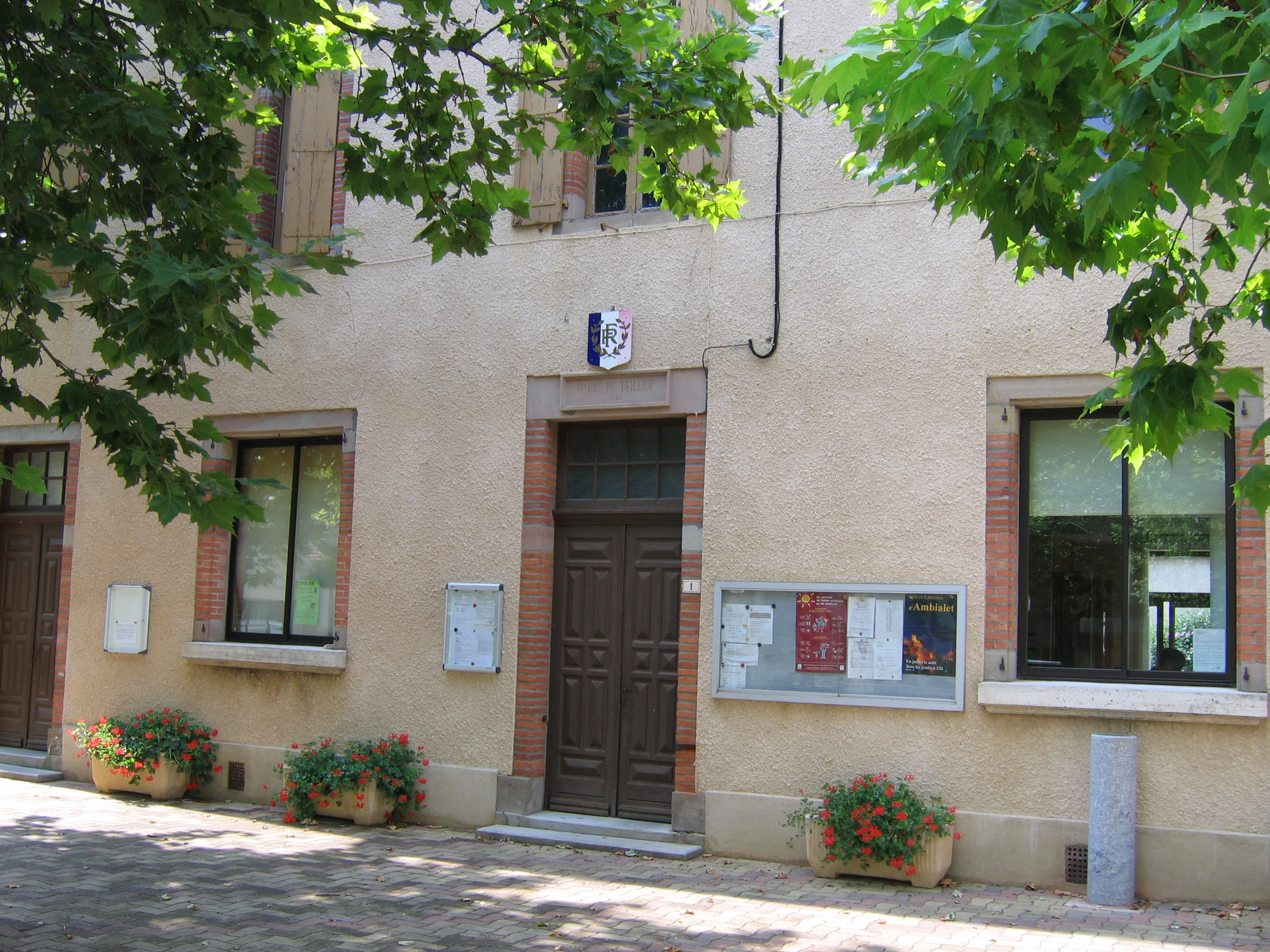
- Teillet: the mairie

- Coat of arms
- Location of Teillet
- Location within France Location within Occitanie
- Coordinates: 43°50′07″N 2°20′24″E
- Country: France
- Region: Occitania
- Department: Tarn
- Arrondissement: Albi
- Canton: Le Haut Dadou
- Intercommunality: Monts d'Alban et Villefranchois

Government
  - Mayor (2020–2026): Sandrine Sandral
- Area^{1}: 24.22 km^{2} (9.35 sq mi)
- Highest elevation: 534 m (1,752 ft)
- Lowest elevation: 339 m (1,112 ft)
- Population (2023): 458
  - Density: 18.9/km^{2} (49.0/sq mi)
- Time zone: UTC+01:00 (CET)
  - Summer (DST): UTC+02:00 (CEST)
- INSEE/Postal code: 81295 /81120
- ^{1} French Land Register data, which excludes lakes, ponds, glaciers > 1 km^{2} (0.386 sq mi or 247 acres) and river estuaries.

Teillet (French pronunciation: [tɛjɛ]; Occitan: Telhet) is a commune in the Tarn department and Occitanie region of southern France.

The name of the settlement – Telhet in Occitan – means "little linden".

== See also ==
- Communes of the Tarn department
