= Canton of Le Haut Dadou =

Coordinates: 43.77°N 2.19°E

The canton of Le Haut Dadou is an administrative division of the Tarn department, southern France. It was created at the French canton reorganisation which came into effect in March 2015. Its seat is in Réalmont.

It consists of the following communes:

1. Alban
2. Ambialet
3. Arifat
4. Bellegarde-Marsal
5. Curvalle
6. Fauch
7. Le Fraysse
8. Laboutarie
9. Lamillarié
10. Lombers
11. Massals
12. Miolles
13. Montredon-Labessonnié
14. Mont-Roc
15. Mouzieys-Teulet
16. Orban
17. Paulinet
18. Poulan-Pouzols
19. Rayssac
20. Réalmont
21. Saint-André
22. Sieurac
23. Teillet
24. Terre-de-Bancalié
25. Villefranche-d'Albigeois
