= Pier (bridge structure) =

Structure of a bridge

A bridge pier is an intermediate support, placed atop a foundation, that holds the deck of the span. It is a permanent support, as opposed to temporary shoring used during construction.

== History ==
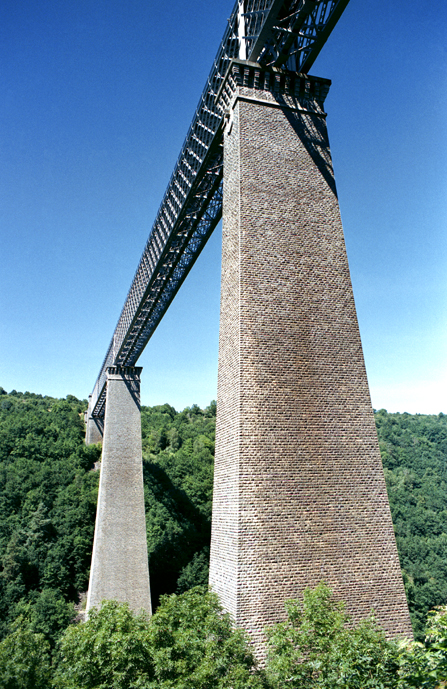
Fades viaduct – the tallest traditional masonry piers ever built (92 m)

Until the advent of concrete and the use of cast iron and then steel, bridges were made of masonry. Roman bridges were sturdy, semicircular, and rested on thick piers, with a width equal to about half the span of the vault.

It was only from 1750, with Jean-Rodolphe Perronet, that the thickness of the piers could be reduced. While it was considered an absolute rule to give them a thickness equal to one-fifth of the span, Perronet proposed and succeeded in having thicknesses equal to one-tenth of the span and rises varying between one-fifth and one-seventh accepted. These reductions significantly reduced the obstacle to water flow created by the structure. With a height of 92 meters, the piers of the Fades viaduct in France, inaugurated on 10 October 1909, are the tallest traditional masonry piers ever built.

Considerable progress was then made with the invention of modern natural cement discovered in 1791 by James Parker in England and especially through the work of Louis Vicat in France (1813–1818) who laid the foundations of the hydraulic binders industry and thus of concrete. The alliance with steel gave birth to reinforced concrete, allowing the construction of increasingly daring and economical structures. Paul Séjourné would be the last great theorist of masonry bridges, and his methods and formulas for calculating piers remain relevant today.

Piers then became more slender and taller. As early as 1937, considerable height was reached with the Golden Gate Bridge in the United States, which has pylons 230 m (750 ft) tall that integrate piers below the deck and towers to support the span's suspension cables above it.

A further leap forward occurred with the emergence of two new technologies: pre-stressed concrete developed by Eugène Freyssinet in 1928 and high-performance concrete in the 1980s. The combination of the two allowed for the construction of very tall piers.

== Masonry piers ==
=== Composition ===
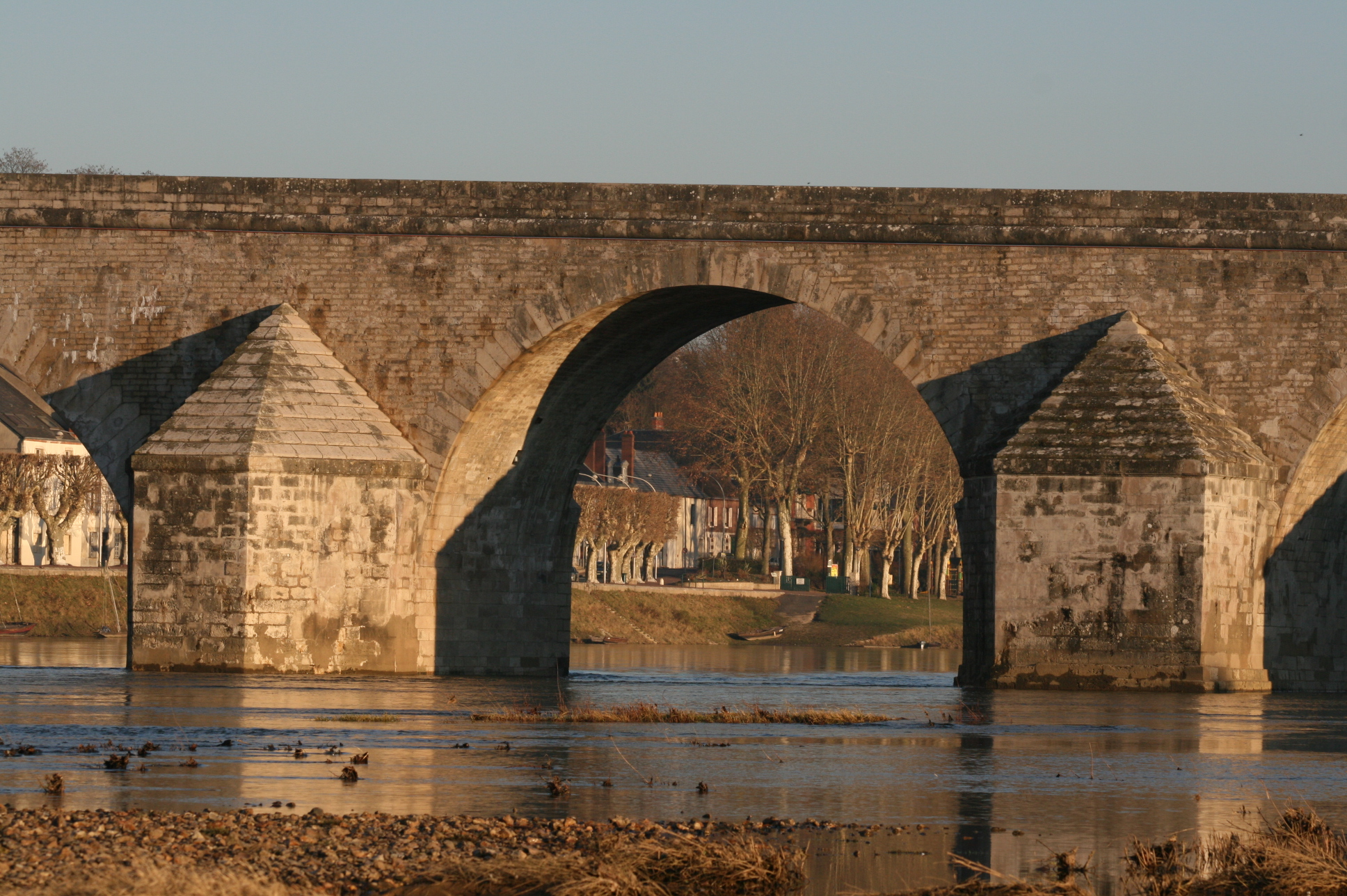
Old Gien Bridge (Loiret, France) – masonry piers, protected downstream here by backwaters

In masonry bridge piers, there is a resistant part and a filling part:

- The periphery of the shafts over a certain thickness constitutes the resistant part, made of rough or dressed stone or brick.
- The filling within the periphery, which consists of rough stones or rubble, bonded or not by mortar or cement, offering no particular mechanical resistance and sometimes being of very poor and very heterogeneous quality.

=== Calculation ===
The dimensions of the supports result from the consideration of four criteria: stability against overturning, compression resistance of the support masonry, permissible pressure on the ground, and aesthetics.

However, the piers of the first bridges were not calculated, and the characteristics of the structures resulted from empirical formulas. The piers of the early structures were very robust to ensure the stability of the support during construction: each pier was self-stable under the thrust of the already built vault. Subsequently, technical evolution, such as simultaneous vault construction, allowed for refinement.

The thickness of the piers at the level of the vault springing lines is given by the formulas of Paul Séjourné.

=== Low piers ===
In this case, the height of the structure, measured between the top of the deck and the ground, is between the values a/3 and a/2, where a denotes the span of the arch, which is generally a semicircular or elliptical arch.

The thickness e of the pier depends solely on the span of the arches: a/10 < e < a/8.

=== High piers ===
The total height of the structure is generally between 1.5a and 2.5a.

The arches are semicircular, and their thickness T depends both on the span a of the arches and on the height H of the structure:

If H = 2.5a, T = 0.1a + 0.04H
If H < 2.5a, T = 0.125a + 0.04H

However, if the span a is small (a < 8 m), it is preferable to use the following formula for T:

T = 0.15a + 0.4

== Concrete piers ==
Most of the piers of modern bridges are made of reinforced concrete or prestressed concrete for larger structures. Two types of forms are mainly encountered: columns or walls.

Each support can be composed of one or more walls or columns. The standard-shaped walls that can be found on most highways are represented in the illustration opposite.

Columns, being visible surfaces, are often subject to architectural research. This can result in a different section from the classic disc or specific surfaces. This is called architectural concrete.

Some structures have pile forms different from these two classic forms of column or wall. The deck of the Europe Bridge in Orléans (France) is supported by particularly original tripodal piers.

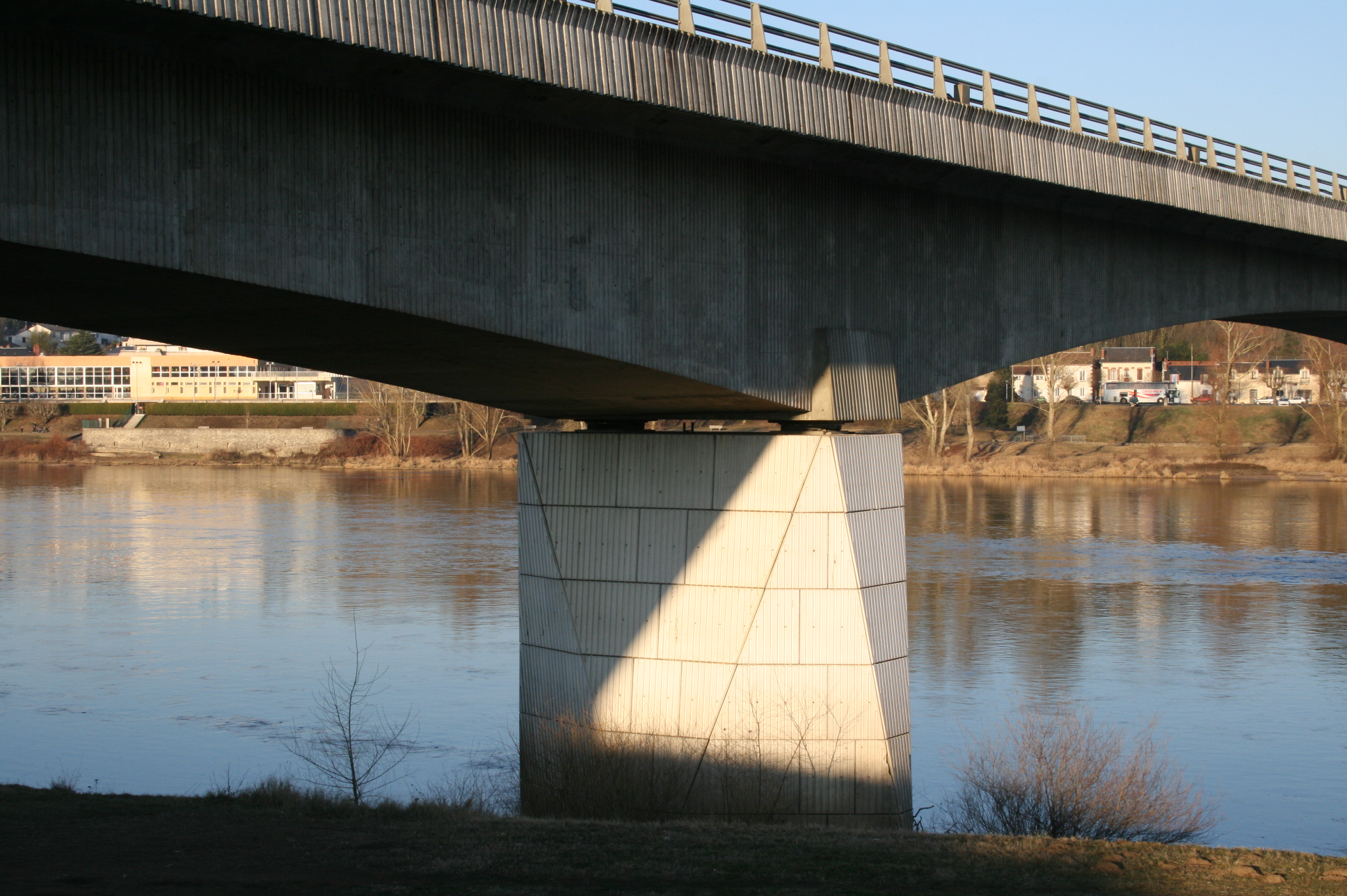
New Gien Bridge (Gien, Loiret department, France)

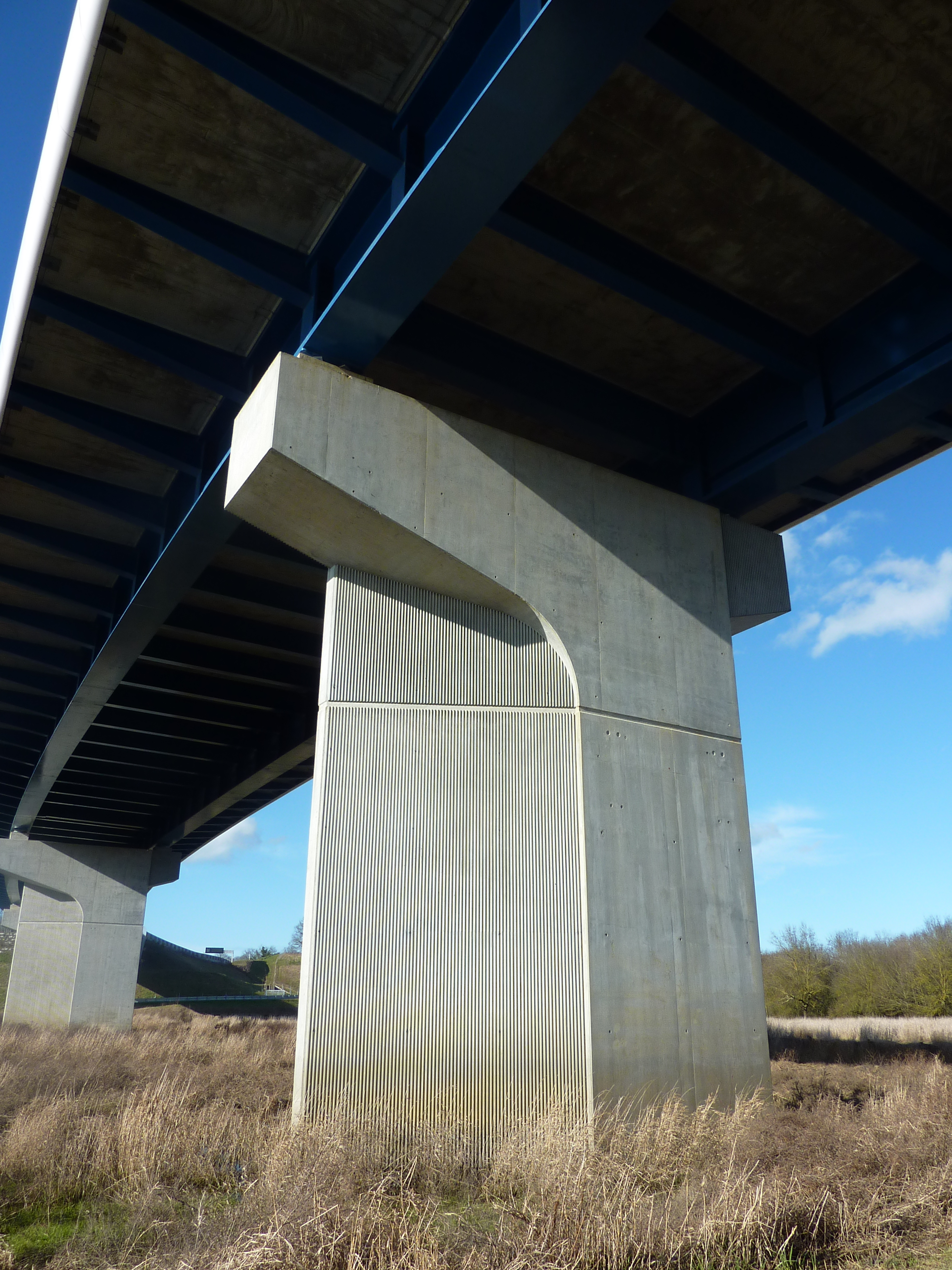
Maine Viaduct (Angers, Maine-et-Loire department, France)

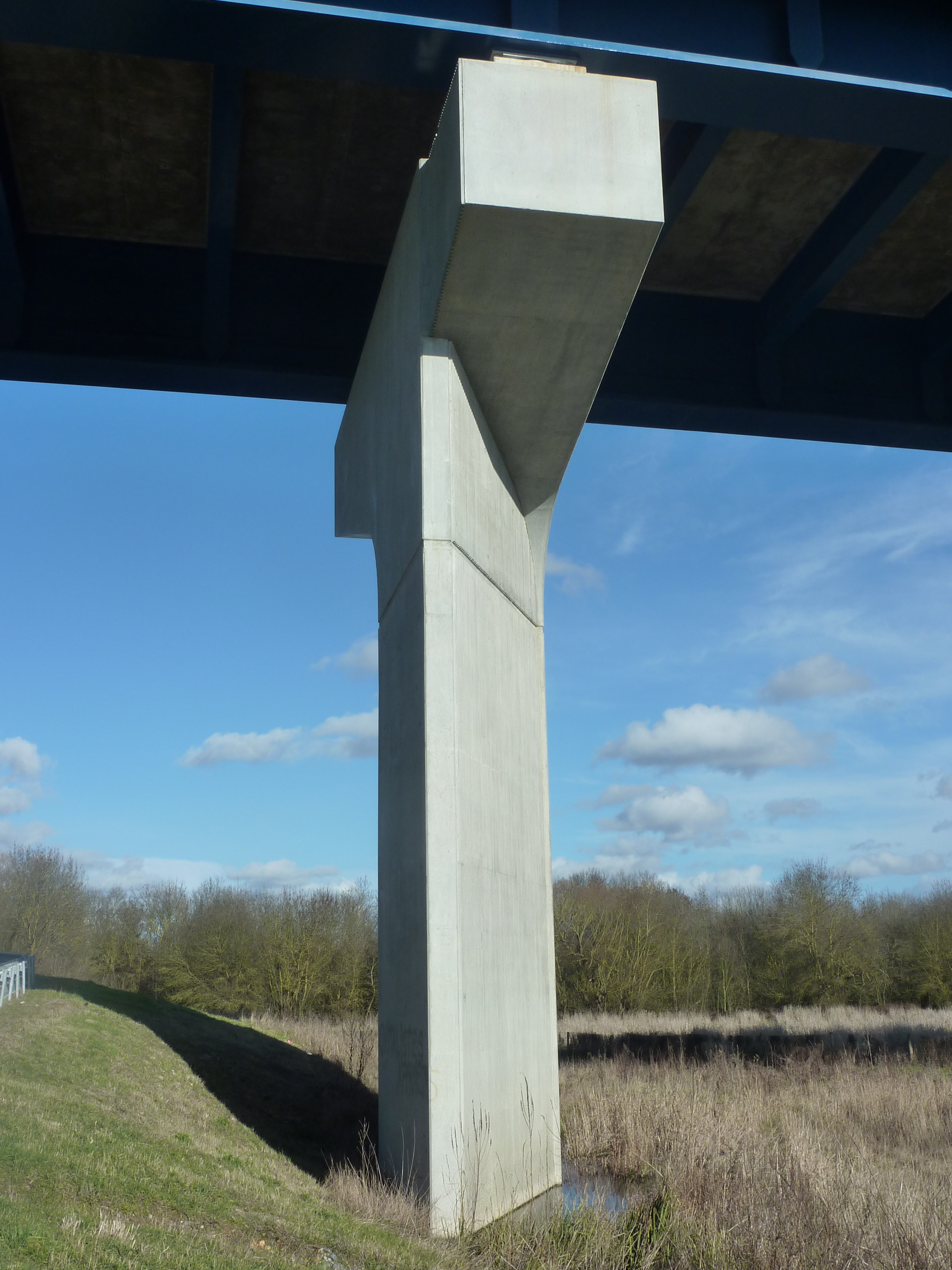
Same

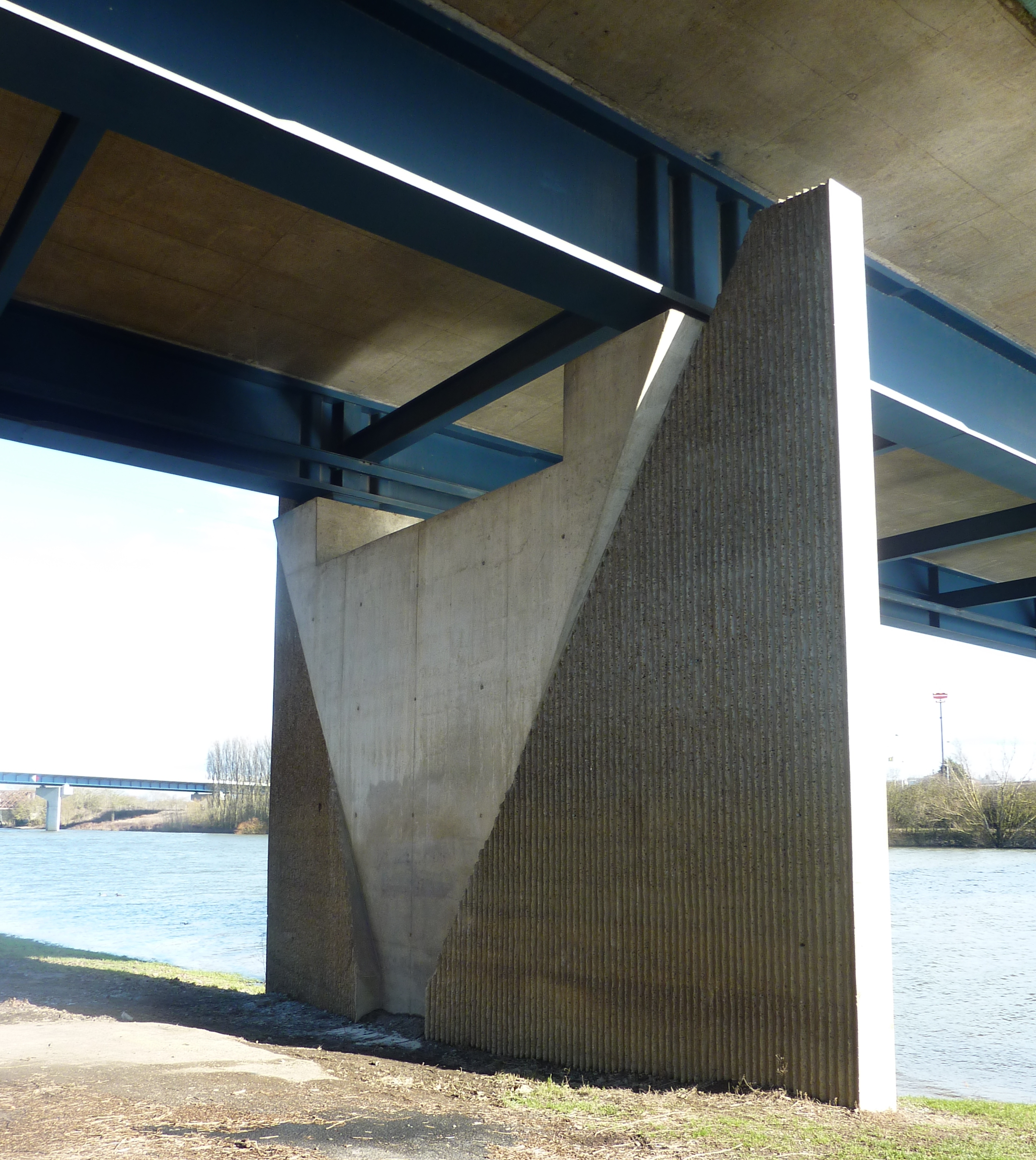
Jean-Moulin Bridge (also in Angers)

== Tall piles ==
A pile is considered tall when it exceeds 70 m. The slenderness, the ratio of the maximum diameter of the shaft to the height of the pile, is generally less than or equal to 1/10°. The compression exerted at the base of the pile is accentuated both by the weight of the pile itself and by the weight of the supported deck, as tall height generally combines, for architectural reasons, with long span. Therefore, this is a logical and sometimes privileged area for the use of high-performance concrete.

=== Concrete composition ===
High-performance concretes are manufactured by reducing the porosity of the concrete, which means reducing the ratio E/C of the mass of water to that of cement per 1 m³ of concrete. An E/C ratio below 0.4 generally corresponds, with common cements, to the domain of HPC (the strength then exceeds 50 MPa). In practice, to overcome the decrease in workability of the concrete due to low E/C ratios, superplasticizers are used to deflocculate the fines (cement, mineral additions, ultra-fines).

The composition of the HPC80 concrete used for the Elorn Bridge was as follows:

- Saint-Vigor CPA HP PM cement: 150 kg/m³
- Saint-Renan 0/4 sand: 744 kg/m³
- Kerguillo 4/10 gravel: 423 kg/m³
- Kerguillo 10/16 gravel: 634 kg/m³
- Silica fume (8%): 36 kg/m³
- Plasticizer (3.95%): 18 kg/m³
- Setting retarder: 1.6 kg/m³
- Water (E/C ratio = 0.32): 132 kg/m³

=== Construction method ===
Two construction methods can be used to build tall piers:

- Climbing or self-climbing formwork is the most commonly used method in France. The formwork relies on the already concreted part to rise to a determined height. However, concrete resumption is necessary each time the concreting is stopped. The piers of the Millau Viaduct and the Verrières Viaduct were built using this method.
- Sliding formwork consists of continuously moving a formwork at a speed between 10 and 30 cm per hour. This technique avoids concrete resumption. The Tsing Ma Bridge (1997) in Hong Kong, the Skarnsundet Bridge (1991), or the Helgeland Bridge (1990) in Norway were built using this method.

=== The world's tallest piers ===
Structures with the tallest piers in the world are concentrated in Europe, specifically in France, Germany, and Austria. The first of these is the Millau Viaduct, which has the tallest pier in the world and two others in the top nine. The list of the fifteen tallest piers is as follows.

N.	Bridge	Pier	Height	Type	Building	Country	Region / city	Function
1	Millau Viaduct	P2	244.8 m	Cable-stayed bridge	2004	France	Millau	Highway
2	Millau Viaduct	P3	221.7 m	Cable-stayed bridge	2004	France	Millau	Highway
3	Kocher Viaduct	P4 and P5	176 m	Girder bridge	1979	Germany	Kocher	Highway
4	Lavant Viaduct	P3 and P4	165 m	Girder bridge	1981	Austria	Twimberg	Highway
5	Rago viaduct	P2	150 m	Box girder bridge	1974	Italy	Morano Calabro	Highway
6	Europa Bridge	P4	146.5 m	Box girder bridge	1963	Austria	Brenner Autobahn	Highway
7	Italia Viaduct	P3	145 m	Box girder bridge	1974	Italy	Laino Borgo	Highway
8	Millau Viaduct	P4	144.55 m	Cable-stayed bridge	2004	France	Millau	Highway
9	Verrières Viaduct	P3	143 m	Cable-stayed bridge	2002	France	Verrières	Road
10	Verrières Viaduct	P2	141 m	Cable-stayed bridge	2002	France	Verrières	Road
11	Europa Bridge	P3	136.5 m	Girder bridge	1963	Austria	Brenner Autobahn	Highway
12	Millau Viaduct	P5	136.4 m	Cable-stayed bridge	2004	France	Millau	Highway
13	Neckar Viaduct	P2	127 m	Box girder bridge	1978	Germany	Neckar	Road
14	Pays de Tulle Viaduct	P4	124 m	Girder bridge	2002	France	Tulle	Highway

== See also ==
- Bridge
- Bridge bearing

== Bibliography ==
- Delbecq, Jean-Michel (1982). Les ponts en maçonnerie (in French). SETRA.
- Prade, Marcel (1986). Les ponts – monuments historiques. Art et Patrimoine (in French). Brissaud. ISBN 2-902170-54-8.
- Allard, R.; Kienert, G. (1957). Notions de travaux publics (in French). Eyrolles.
- d’Aloïa, Laetitia; Légeron, Frédéric; Le Roy, Robert; Runfola, Pierre; Toutlemonde, François (2003). Valorisation des bétons à hautes performances dans les piles et pylônes de grande hauteur des ouvrages d'art (in French). Laboratoire Central des Ponts et Chaussées. ISBN 2-7208-3118-2.
