= Verrières =

Verrières is the name or part of the name of several communes in France:

- Verrières, Ardennes
- Verrières, Aube
- Verrières, Aveyron
- Verrières, Charente
- Verrières, Marne
- Verrières, Orne
- Verrières, Puy-de-Dôme
- Verrières, Vienne
- Verrières-de-Joux, Doubs department
- Verrières-du-Grosbois, Doubs department
- Verrières-en-Forez, Loire department
- Verrières-le-Buisson, Essonne department

== In fiction ==
- Verrières, a village in Stendhal's The Red and the Black (Le Rouge et le Noir)

== See also ==
- Veyrières (disambiguation)
