= Séjourné =

Séjourné is a surname. Notable people with the surname include:

- Emmanuel Séjourné (born 1961), French composer and percussionist
- Laurette Séjourné (1911–2003), Mexican archeologist and ethnologist
- Paul Séjourné (1851–1939), French engineer
- Stéphane Séjourné (born 1985), French lawyer and politician
