= Charbonnières-les-Sapins =

- Part of Étalans
- Location of Charbonnières-les-Sapins
- Location within France Location within Bourgogne-Franche-Comté
- Coordinates: 47°08′52″N 6°12′56″E
- Country: France
- Region: Bourgogne-Franche-Comté
- Department: Doubs
- Arrondissement: Pontarlier
- Canton: Ornans
- Commune: Étalans
- Area^{1}: 9.1 km^{2} (3.5 sq mi)
- Highest elevation: 583 m (1,913 ft)
- Lowest elevation: 400 m (1,300 ft)
- Population (2014): 190
  - Density: 21/km^{2} (54/sq mi)
- Time zone: UTC+01:00 (CET)
  - Summer (DST): UTC+02:00 (CEST)
- Postal code: 25620
- ^{1} French Land Register data, which excludes lakes, ponds, glaciers > 1 km^{2} (0.386 sq mi or 247 acres) and river estuaries.

Charbonnières-les-Sapins (French pronunciation: [ʃaʁbɔnjɛʁ le sapɛ̃]) is a former commune in the Doubs department in the Bourgogne-Franche-Comté region in eastern France. On 1 January 2017, it was merged into the commune Étalans.

== See also ==
- Communes of the Doubs department
