= Étalans =

- Commune
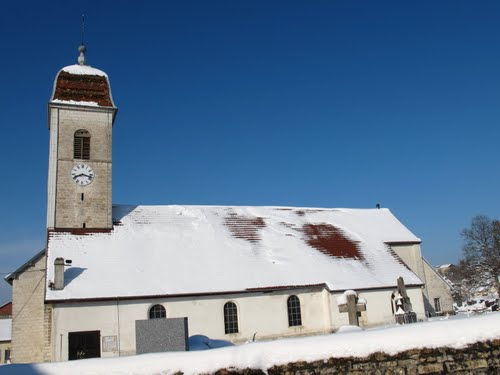
- St. Nicholas' Church

- Coat of arms
- Location of Étalans
- Location within France Location within Bourgogne-Franche-Comté
- Coordinates: 47°09′07″N 6°16′09″E
- Country: France
- Region: Bourgogne-Franche-Comté
- Department: Doubs
- Arrondissement: Pontarlier
- Canton: Valdahon
- Intercommunality: Portes du Haut-Doubs

Government
  - Mayor (2020–2026): Paul Ruchet
- Area^{1}: 40.91 km^{2} (15.80 sq mi)
- Highest elevation: 638 m (2,093 ft)
- Lowest elevation: 520 m (1,710 ft)
- Population (2023): 1,643
  - Density: 40.16/km^{2} (104.0/sq mi)
- Time zone: UTC+01:00 (CET)
  - Summer (DST): UTC+02:00 (CEST)
- INSEE/Postal code: 25222 /25580
- ^{1} French Land Register data, which excludes lakes, ponds, glaciers > 1 km^{2} (0.386 sq mi or 247 acres) and river estuaries.

Étalans is a commune in the Doubs department in the Bourgogne-Franche-Comté region in eastern France. On 1 January 2017, the former communes of Charbonnières-les-Sapins and Verrières-du-Grosbois were merged into Étalans.

== Population ==
Population data refer to the area corresponding with the commune as of January 2025.

Historical population
Year	Pop.	±% p.a.
1968	853	—
1975	978	+1.97%
1982	902	−1.15%
1990	1,051	+1.93%
1999	1,103	+0.54%
2007	1,306	+2.13%
2012	1,422	+1.72%
2017	1,550	+1.74%
2023	1,643	+0.98%
Source: INSEE

== See also ==
- Communes of the Doubs department
