= Veyrières =

Veyrières may refer to the following places in France:

- Veyrières, Cantal, a commune in the department of Cantal
- Veyrières, Corrèze, a commune in the department of Corrèze

== See also ==
- Verrières (disambiguation)
