= Verrières-du-Grosbois =

- Part of Étalans
- Location of Verrières-du-Grosbois
- Location within France Location within Bourgogne-Franche-Comté
- Coordinates: 47°12′06″N 6°16′40″E
- Country: France
- Region: Bourgogne-Franche-Comté
- Department: Doubs
- Arrondissement: Pontarlier
- Canton: Valdahon
- Commune: Étalans
- Area^{1}: 7.86 km^{2} (3.03 sq mi)
- Highest elevation: 635 m (2,083 ft)
- Lowest elevation: 555 m (1,821 ft)
- Population (2014): 38
  - Density: 4.8/km^{2} (13/sq mi)
- Time zone: UTC+01:00 (CET)
  - Summer (DST): UTC+02:00 (CEST)
- Postal code: 25580
- ^{1} French Land Register data, which excludes lakes, ponds, glaciers > 1 km^{2} (0.386 sq mi or 247 acres) and river estuaries.

Verrières-du-Grosbois (French pronunciation: [vɛʁjɛʁ dy ɡʁobwa]) is a former commune in the Doubs department in the Bourgogne-Franche-Comté region in eastern France. On 1 January 2017, it was merged into the commune Étalans.

== See also ==
- Communes of the Doubs department
