= Verrières Viaduct =

Verrières Viaduct Viaduc de Verrières
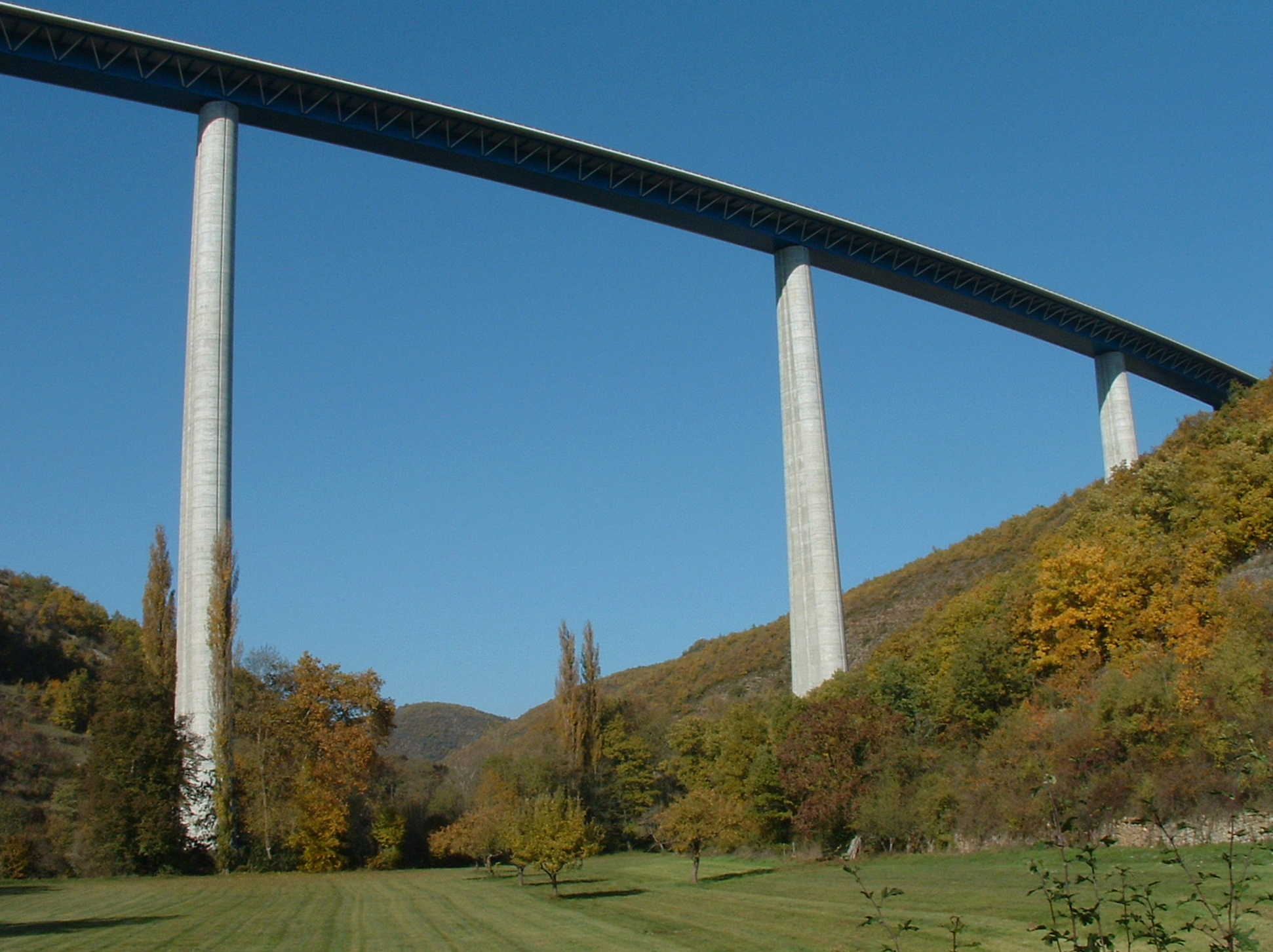
- View in November 2003
- Coordinates: 44.1972°N 3.0652°E
- Carries: Vehicles on the A75 autoroute
- Crosses: River Lumensonesque
- Locale: Verrières, Aveyron, Occitanie, southern France

Characteristics
- Design: Box girder bridge
- Material: Steel reinforced concrete composite
- Total length: 720 m (2,360 ft)
- Width: 23.5 m (77 ft)
- Height: 141 m (463 ft)
- Longest span: 144 m (472 ft)
- No. of spans: 6

History
- Architect: André Mascarelli
- Constructed by: Spie Batignolles (concrete road deck), Groupe Razel (concrete piers)
- Construction start: August 1998
- Construction end: January 2002
- Construction cost: 36,635,000 euros
- Opened: 2002
- Inaugurated: 2002

Location
- Interactive map of Verrières Viaduct

The Verrières Viaduct is a curved 720-metre long concrete autoroute box girder bridge in the south of France, which at one point was briefly the highest bridge in France; it is roughly 141 metres (463 ft) tall. The nearby Millau Viaduct, completed in 2004 and standing at 343 metres (1,125 ft) tall, is currently the tallest bridge in France.

== History ==
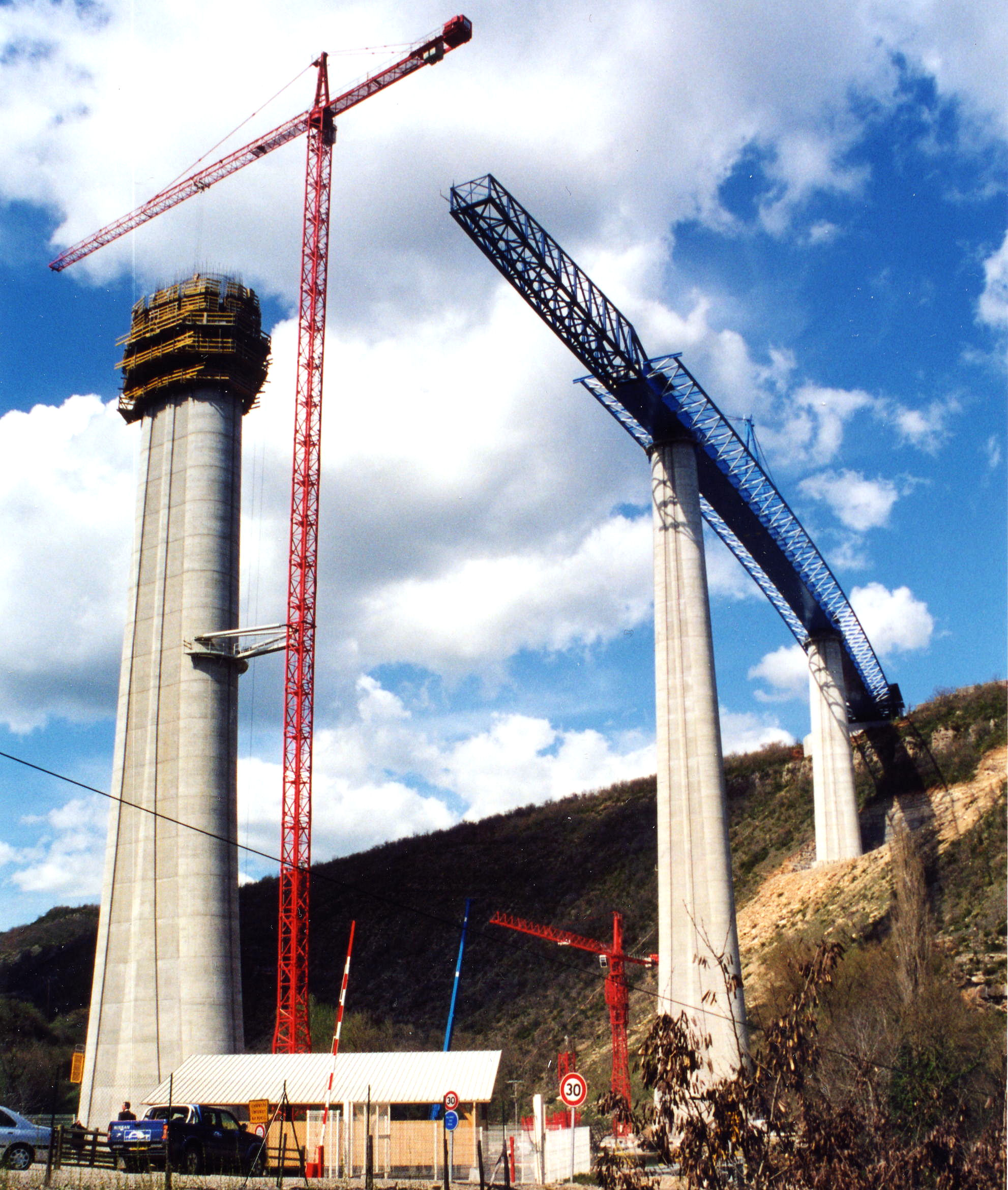
Construction in 2002 (the highest P3 pier is being built, with P2 and P1)

=== Design ===
It would be the highest bridge in France. It has a concrete road deck, built on steel girders. The concrete piers are from 40 metres to 140 metres in height. Société d'études techniques et économiques (SETEC) carried out design work for the shape of the road deck.

P3 pier would be the highest at 141.36m.

=== Construction ===
In August 1999, construction began of the steel deck structure on-site. In January 2002, the bridge deck was incrementally launched from one side. The bridge was too high to be built with a crane. 6,200 tonnes of steel were built, with 22,000 cubic metres of concrete for the five concrete piers. Groupe Razel built the concrete piers.

The steelwork was built by Société d'études R. Foucault et Associés (SERF) of Cergy in Paris (Île-de-France).

Construction finished in January 2002.
