= Verrières, Aveyron =

Commune in Occitanie, France

Verrières
- Commune
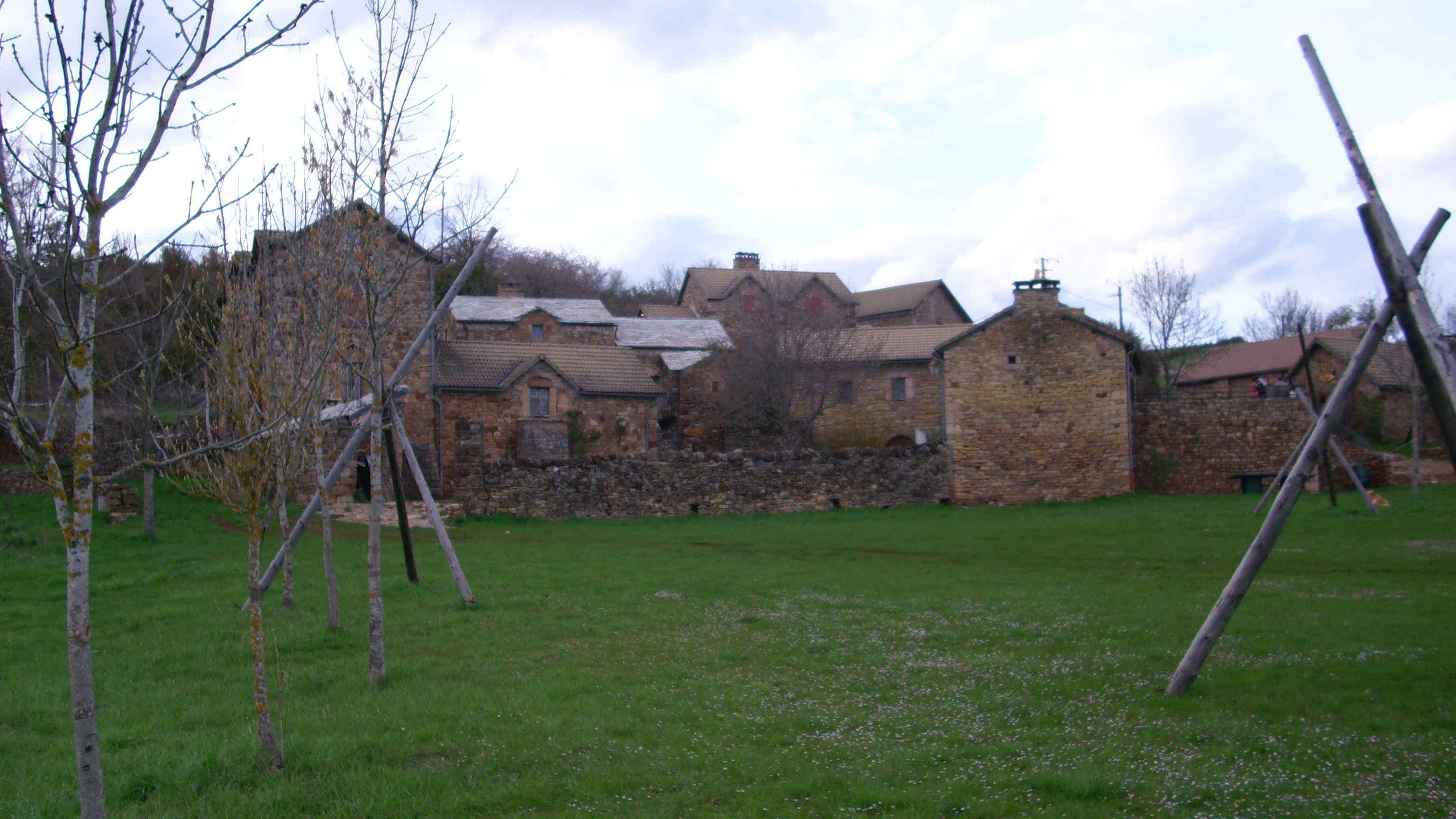
- The hamlet of Bécours
- Location of Verrières
- Location within France Location within Occitanie
- Coordinates: 44°12′08″N 3°03′32″E
- Country: France
- Region: Occitania
- Department: Aveyron
- Arrondissement: Millau
- Canton: Tarn et Causses

Government
  - Mayor (2020–2026): Jérôme Mouries
- Area^{1}: 53.01 km^{2} (20.47 sq mi)
- Elevation: 480 m (1,570 ft)
- Highest elevation: 962 m (3,156 ft)
- Lowest elevation: 420 m (1,380 ft)
- Population (2023): 357
  - Density: 6.73/km^{2} (17.4/sq mi)
- Time zone: UTC+01:00 (CET)
  - Summer (DST): UTC+02:00 (CEST)
- INSEE/Postal code: 12291 /12520
- ^{1} French Land Register data, which excludes lakes, ponds, glaciers > 1 km^{2} (0.386 sq mi or 247 acres) and river estuaries.

Verrières (French pronunciation: [vɛʁjɛʁ]; Occitan: Verièiras) is a commune in the Aveyron department in southern France.

== Population ==
Historical population
Year	Pop.	±% p.a.
1968	368	—
1975	338	−1.21%
1982	351	+0.54%
1990	334	−0.62%
1999	342	+0.26%
2007	375	+1.16%
2012	426	+2.58%
2017	454	+1.28%
2023	357	−3.93%
Source: INSEE

== Geography ==
Nearby is the Verrières Viaduct on the A75 autoroute.

== See also ==
- Communes of the Aveyron department
