= Paul Séjourné =

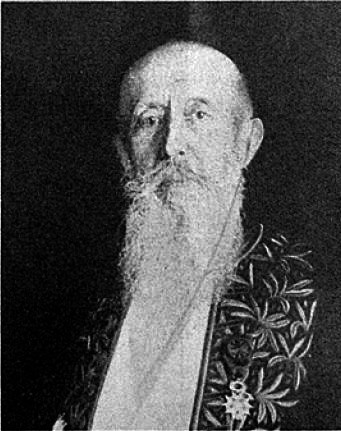
Paul Séjourné

Paul Séjourné (21 December 1851; Orléans – 19 January 1939; Paris) was a French engineer who specialized in the construction of large bridges from masonry, a domain in which he made some important innovations.

== Biography ==
Paul Séjourné graduated from the École polytechnique in 1873 and the civil engineering grande école École nationale des Ponts et Chaussées (ENPC) in 1876, he was appointed Ingénieur des ponts et chaussées in Mende in 1877, then in Toulouse in 1890. In these two positions, Séjourné was responsible for the planning and construction of several railway lines. He made his reputation with innovative methods, and 1886 was decorated with the Légion d'honneur, with the citation 'has designed and built on several railway lines in planning or under construction long span bridges which should be considered as a basis for design'. Between 1890 and 1893, Séjourné took time off from public service to work for the Fives-Lille company in Spain. In 1896 he left the civil service and joined the Chemins de fer de Paris à Lyon et à la Méditerranée (PLM) as chief engineer based in Dijon, all the while continuing to lead other important projects such as the Adolphe Bridge in Luxembourg. He became chief of the construction department of the PLM in 1909. In 1916, Marshal Lyautey named him director of the Moroccan railways. He then returned to the PLM as vice-director in 1919 before retiring at 76 with the title of honorary director.

Between 1901 and 1922, Séjourné taught the construction of large masonry bridges at the ENPC and published a 6 volume manual Grandes Voûtes ('Great Arches) which brought together all his knowledge on the subject. After winning the Caméré prize in 1918, he was elected to the French Academy of Sciences in 1924. In 1926 he was promoted to 'grand officer of the Légion d'honneur'.

A street of the 6th arrondissement of Paris where Paul Séjourné once lived is named in his honor.

== Technical Contributions ==
Paul Séjourné developed some technical innovations: Design and calculation of Centring: Séjourné demonstrated the value of constructing arches by parallel sections, so that the centering only had to support the weight of the section under construction. When a section was complete it bore its own weight and the centering could then support the weight of the next section. The Romans used this technique to limit the cost of the centring but since the Renaissance period it had become standard to make centring that could support the full load of the arch and construct the arch in one go. Séjourné showed that the older technique was perfectly viable and could lower the weight and cost of the centering by up to 70%.

He then introduced twin arches to support a single deck on the Adolph bridge. The weight of the arches is significantly lower, thus reducing the force on the buttresses. He repeated the technique on the Pont des Amidonniers in Toulouse. This technique became widely adopted outside France and was known as the 'Séjourné design'.

While his contemporaries such as Gustav Eiffel resorted systematically to metalwork, Séjourné continued to design and build large span arch bridges in masonry until the end of the 1920s. Thereafter it became cheaper to build with concrete.

== Works ==
Paul Séjourné participated in the following works as:

=== Designer ===
1884 : Pont Antoinette (known as pont de l’Aiguillou) in Sémalens, Lavaur railway bridge, pont de Saint-Waast at Couffouleux, all three on the Montauban-Ville-Bourbon to La Crémade line.

1884 : Pont de Castelet (Ariège), on the Portet-Saint-Simon to Puigcerda line.

1904 : Pont Adolphe in Luxembourg (road bridge over the Pétrusse, with an 84m centre span).

1907 : Pont Séjourné carrying the Avenue Séjourné over the canal de Brienne in Toulouse.

1908 : Pont de Fontpédrouse (known as the pont Séjourné) and viaduc de la Cabanasse (1910) on the Cerdagne line.

1909 : Viaduc de Chanteloube on the Ubaye line from Chorges to Barcelonette. The line was never completed and the viaduct is now submerged in the Serre-Ponçon reservoir, but visible when the water level falls.

1911 : Pont des Amidonniers, known as pont des Catalans, a road bridge over the Garonne in Toulouse.

1912 : Morez viaducts in the Jura on the Andelot-en-Montagne - La Cluse line and the Pont Sidi Rached, Constantine (Algeria).

1914 : Viaduc de la calanque des Eaux salées, viaduc de Corbière, viaduc de la calanque de la Vesse, on the Côte Bleue railway line.

1915 : Mont-d'Or tunnel between Frasne to Vallorbe on the line from Lausanne to Paris

1922 : Viaduc de Saorge (Alpes-Maritimes), on the Tenda line from Nice to Cunéo. This viaduct was destroyed in 1940 by the French army.

1925 : Viaduc de Laussonne et Viaduc de la Recoumène, on the le Puy - Aubenas line, which was never opened.

1926 : Viaduc d’Erbosseria, Peille, Viaduc de L'Escarène, Viaduc du Caï (over the Bévéra), Viaduc du Scarassouï over the Roya (destroyed by the German army in 1944), Viaduc de de Saint-Dalmas-de-Tende, on the Tenda railway line. Also a road bridge in Compiègne over the Oise (destroyed by the French army in June 1940).

1928 : Viaduc de la Roizonne and Viaduc de la Bonne, on the la Mure - Corps railway line are today road bridges.

=== Engineer ===
1888 : Transcaspian railway project, Samarkand (Uzbekistan).

1912 : Andelot-en-Montagne - La Cluse railway line (Jura).

=== Chief Engineer ===
1908 : Bort-les-Orgues to Neussargues railway line in the Massif Central,

1920 to 1934 : in Morocco, the building of the Casablanca - Oued-Zem lines, at Rabat and Marrakech, and the Fez - Oujda junction completing the "imperial way" between Marrakesh and Tunis.

1926 : Tenda line (Nice - Cuneo).

== Bibliography ==
Marc, Giraud; Pascal Bejui (October 2010). Paul Séjourné: Génie des Grand Viaducs (in French). La Roche-Blanche, France: La Regordane. p. 208. ISBN 978-2-906984-89-9.

== Gallery ==
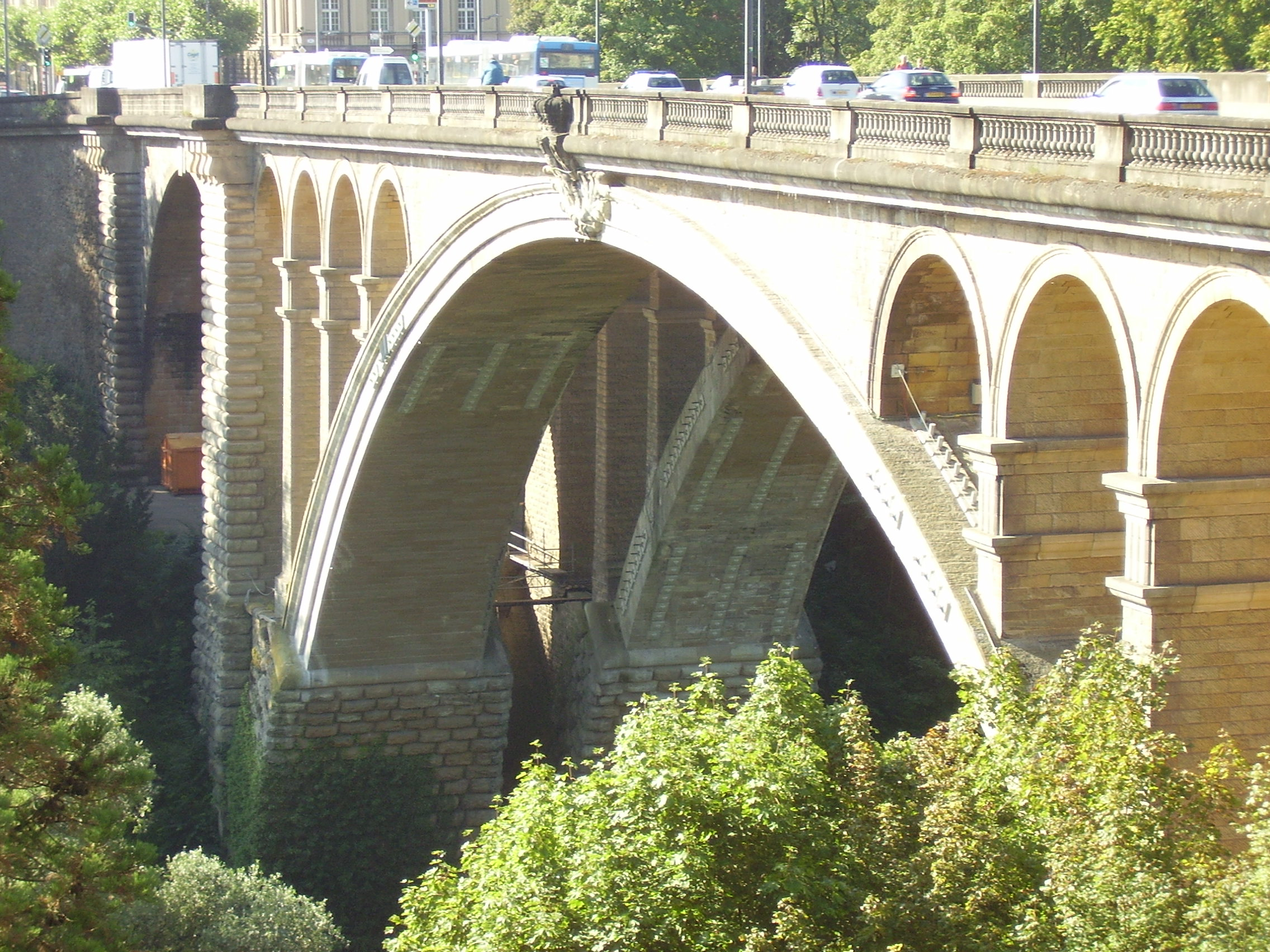
Adolphe Bridge, Luxembourg (1903)

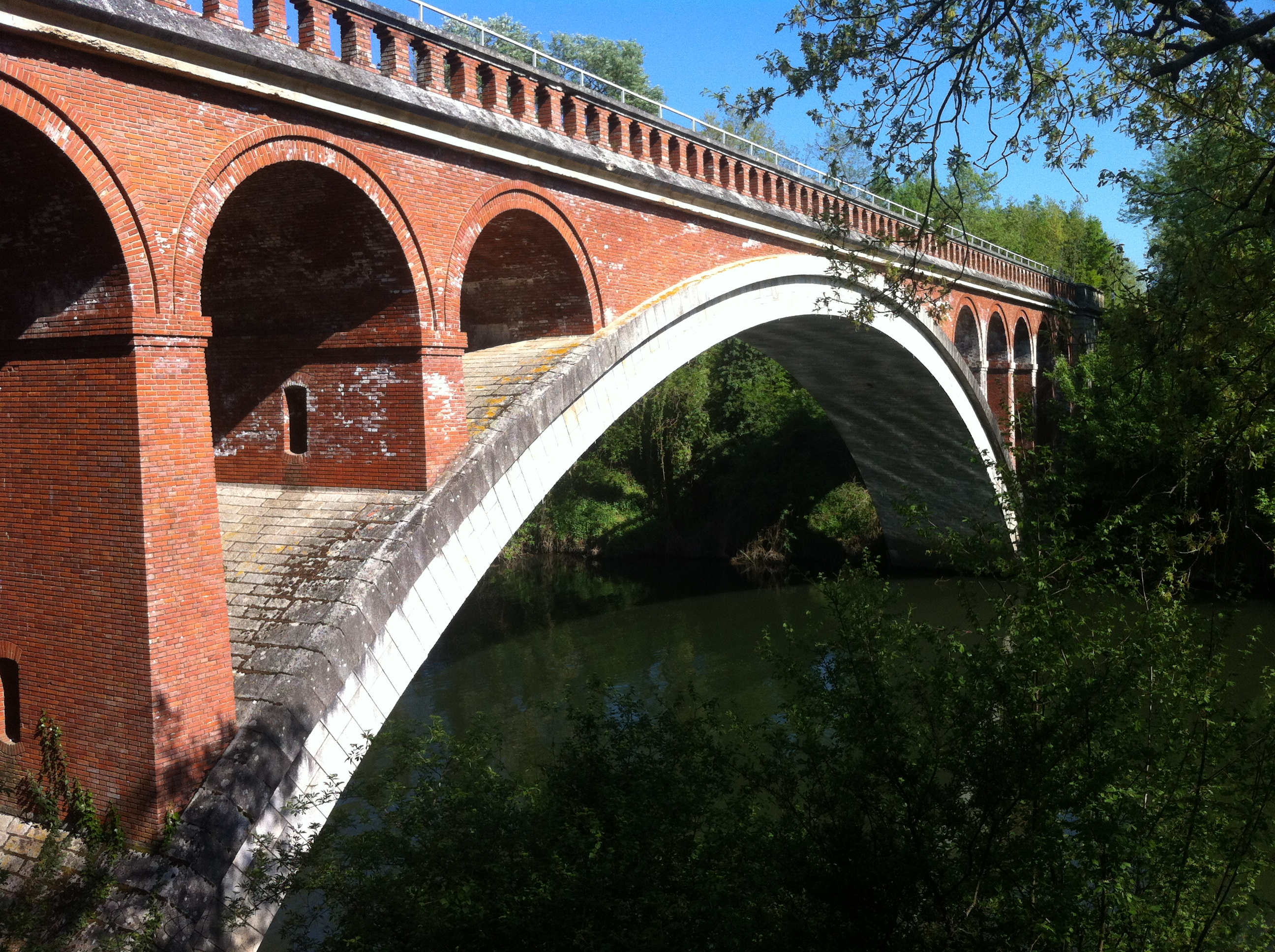
Pont Antoinette (known as pont de l’Aiguillou) in Sémalens, Tarn (1884)

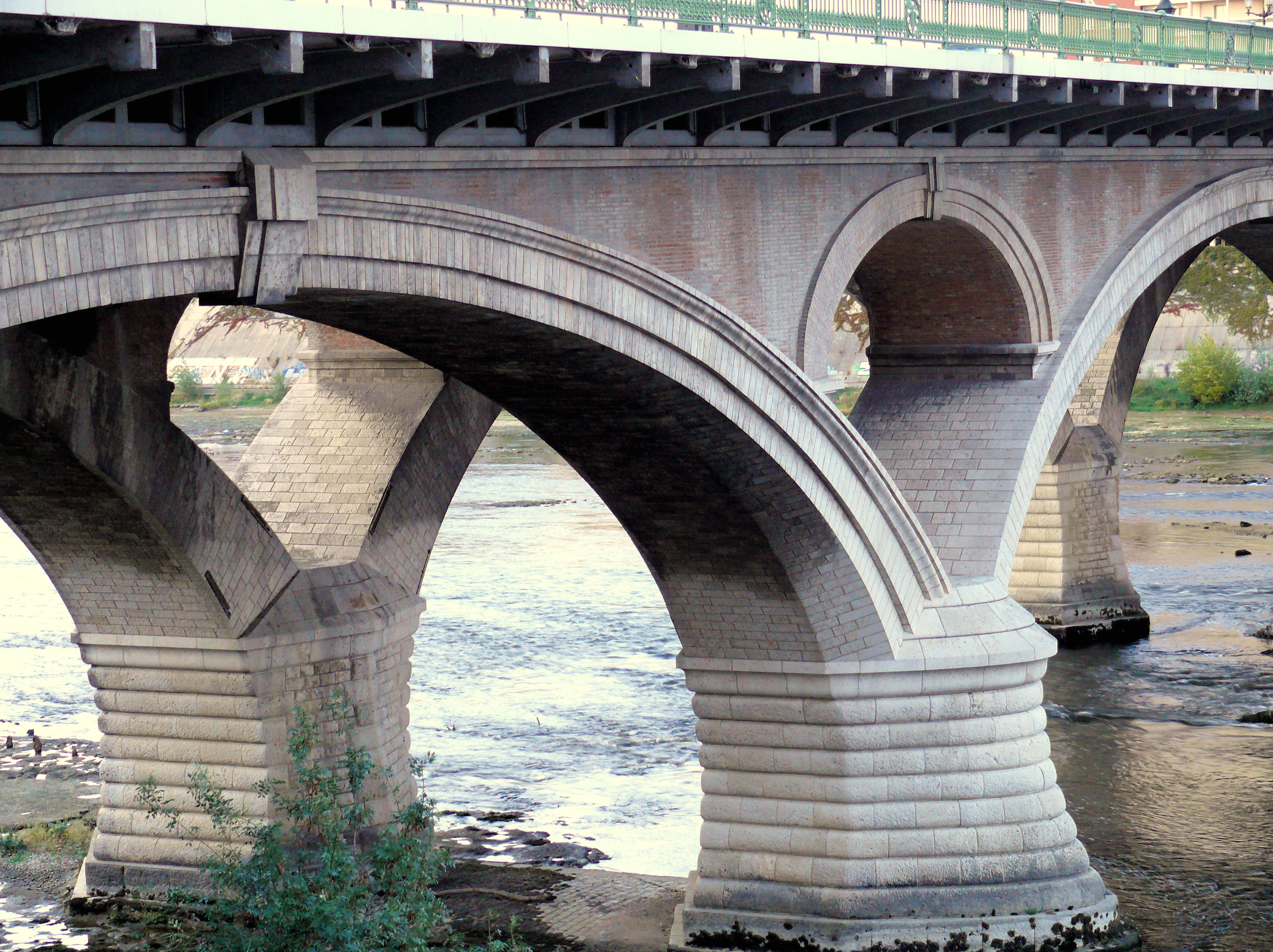
Pont des Amidonniers or Pont des Catalans, Toulouse (1907)

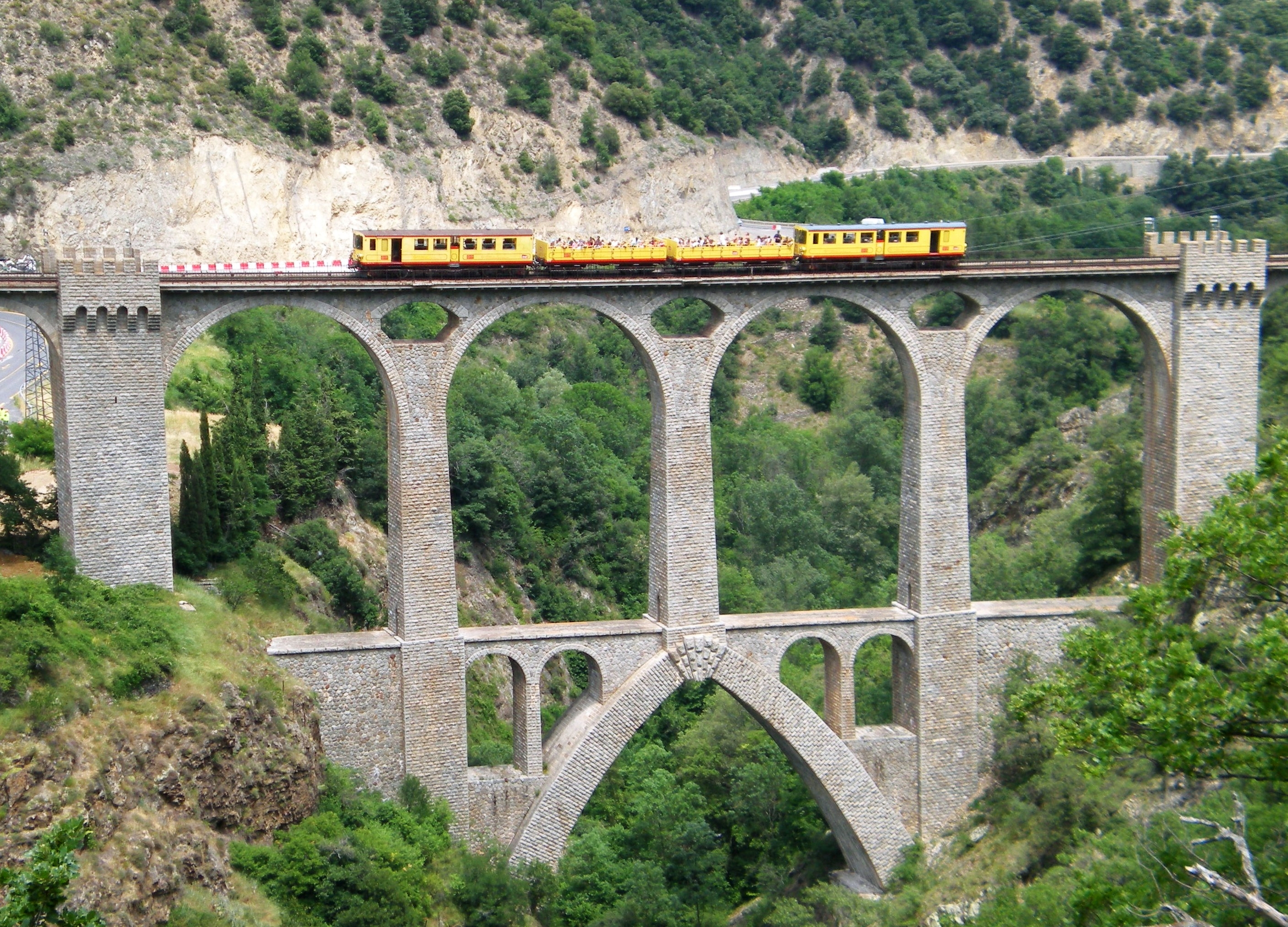
Pont Séjourné, Fontpédrouse, Pyrénées-Orientales (1908).

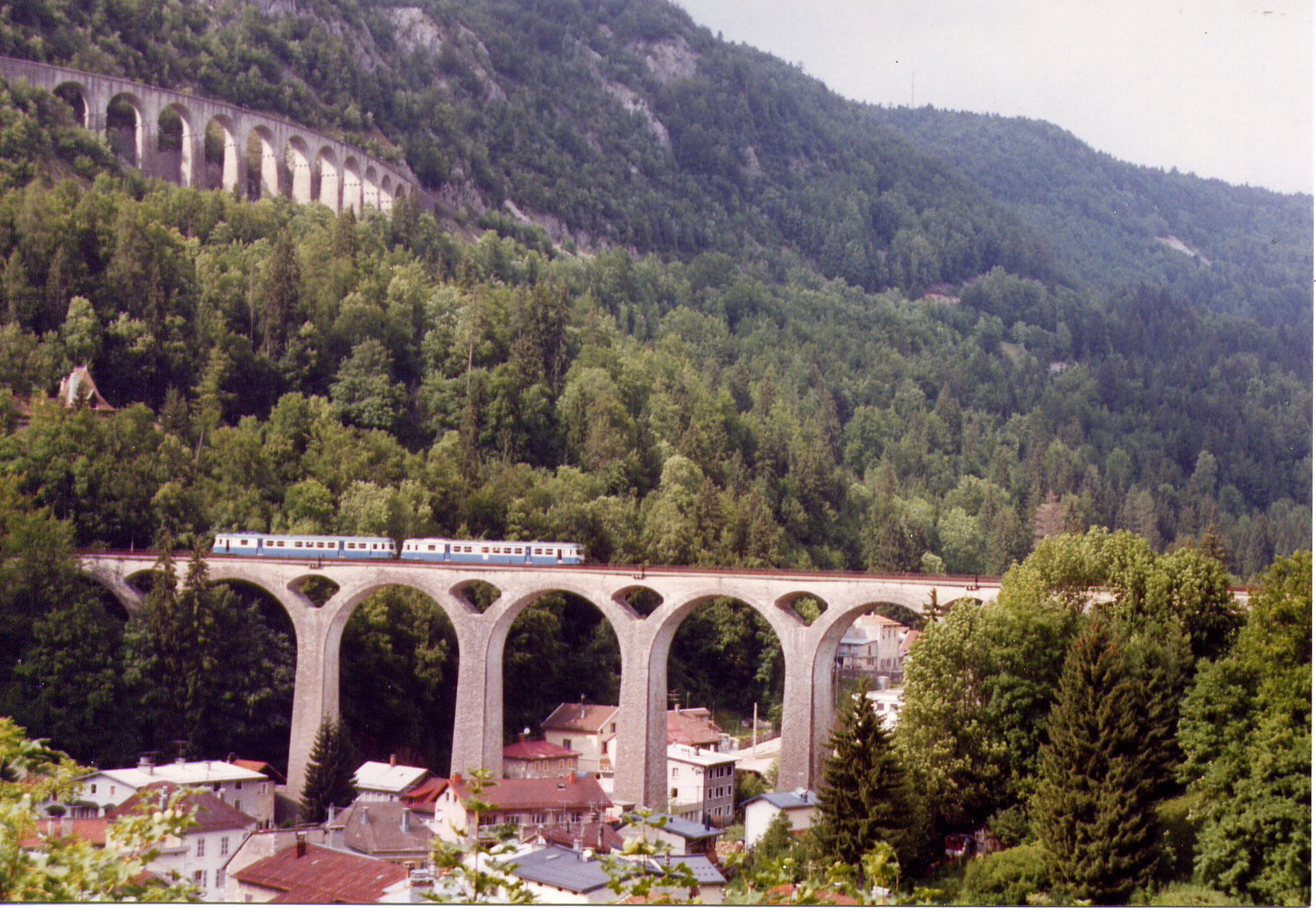
The Morez viaducts on the Andelot-en-Montagne - La Cluse line, Jura (1912)

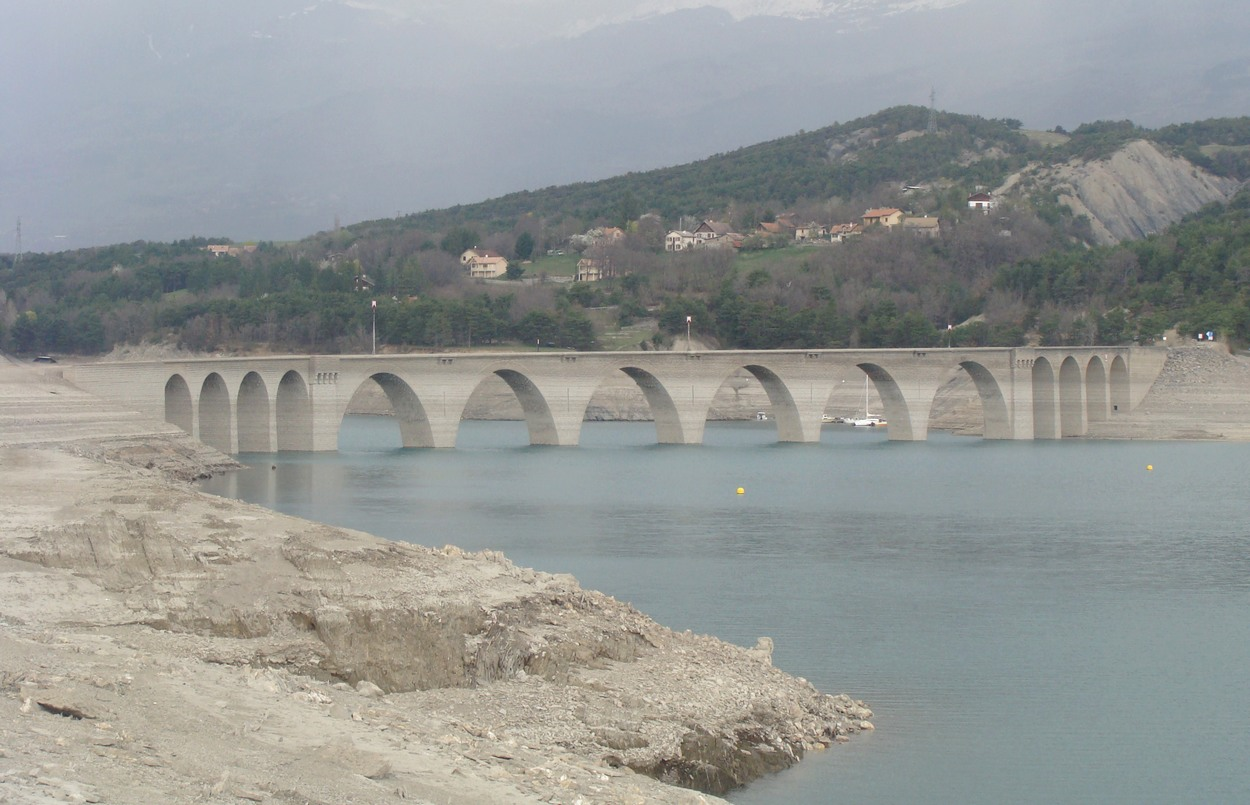
Chanteloube viaduct, near Chorges, Hautes-Alpes (1909 - 1935)

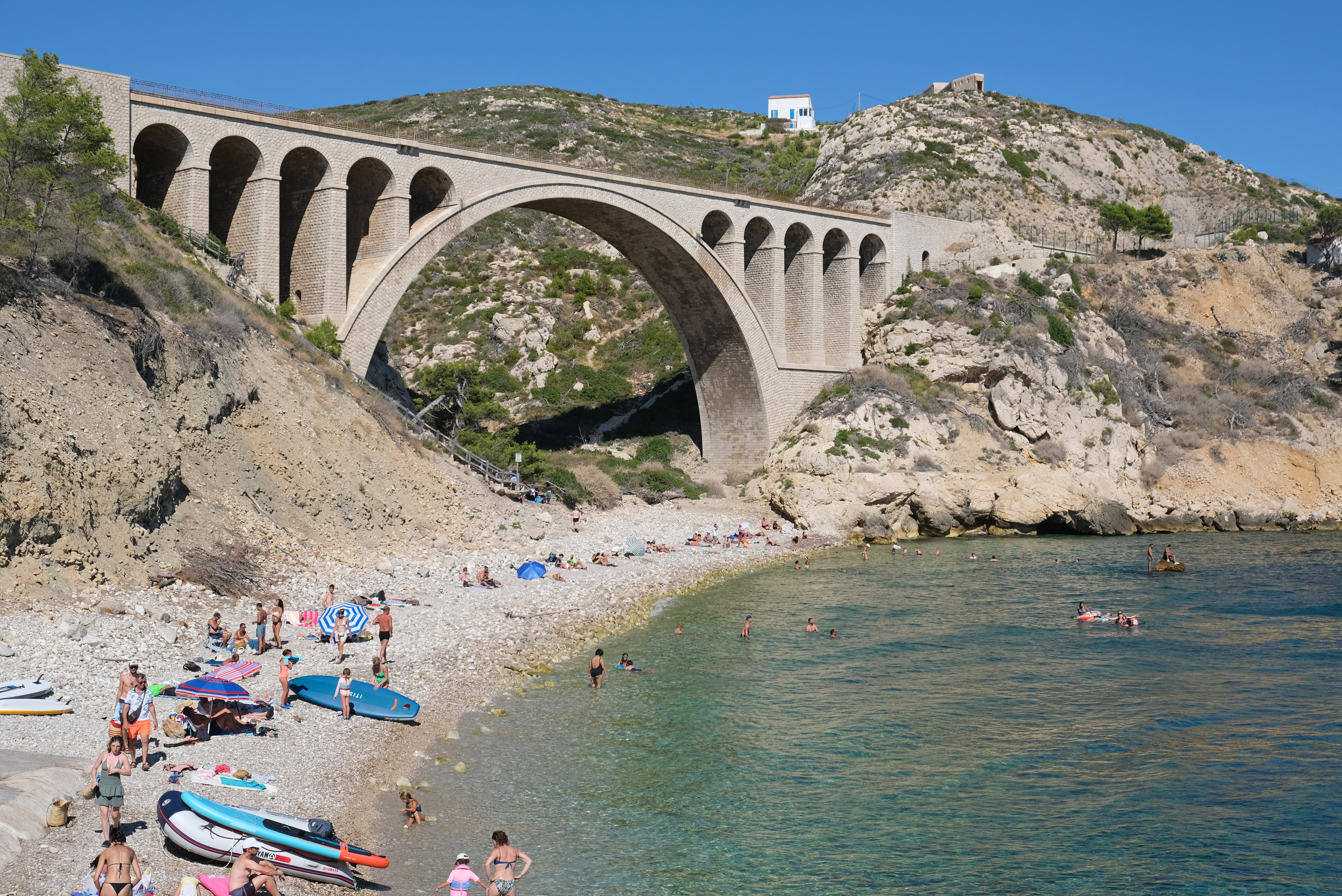
Viaduc des Eaux-salées, Bouches-du-Rhône (1914)

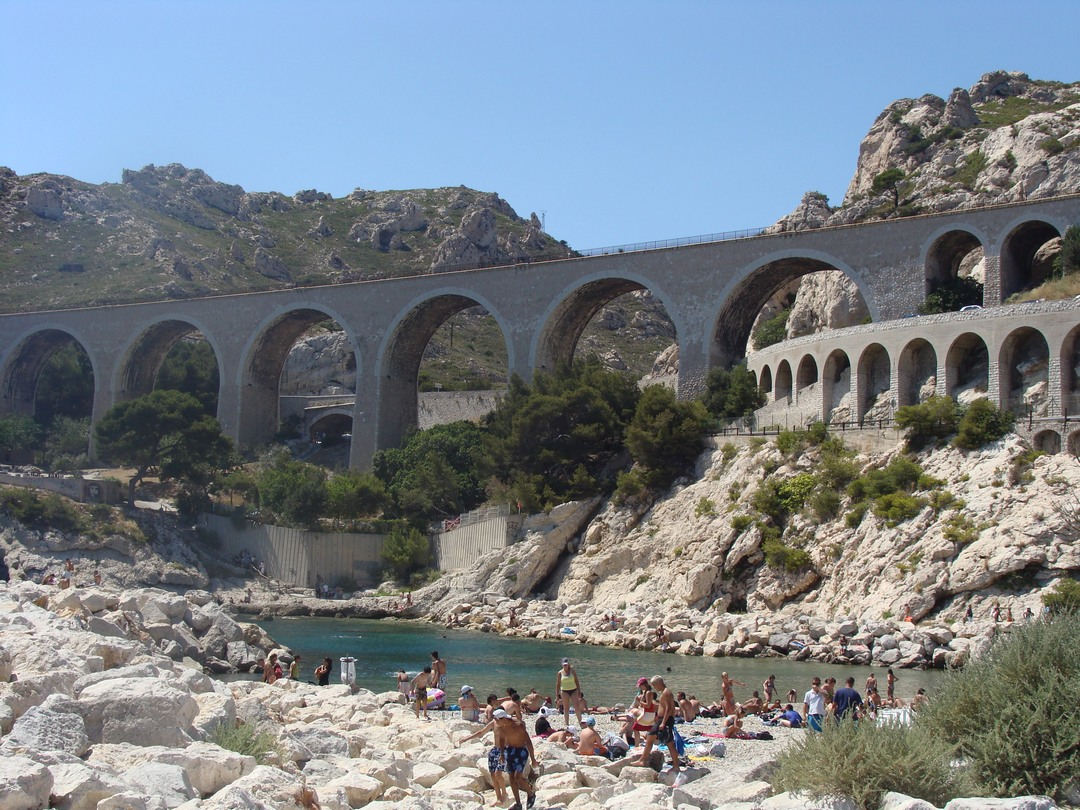
Corbière viaduct, Marseille-L'Estaques (1915)

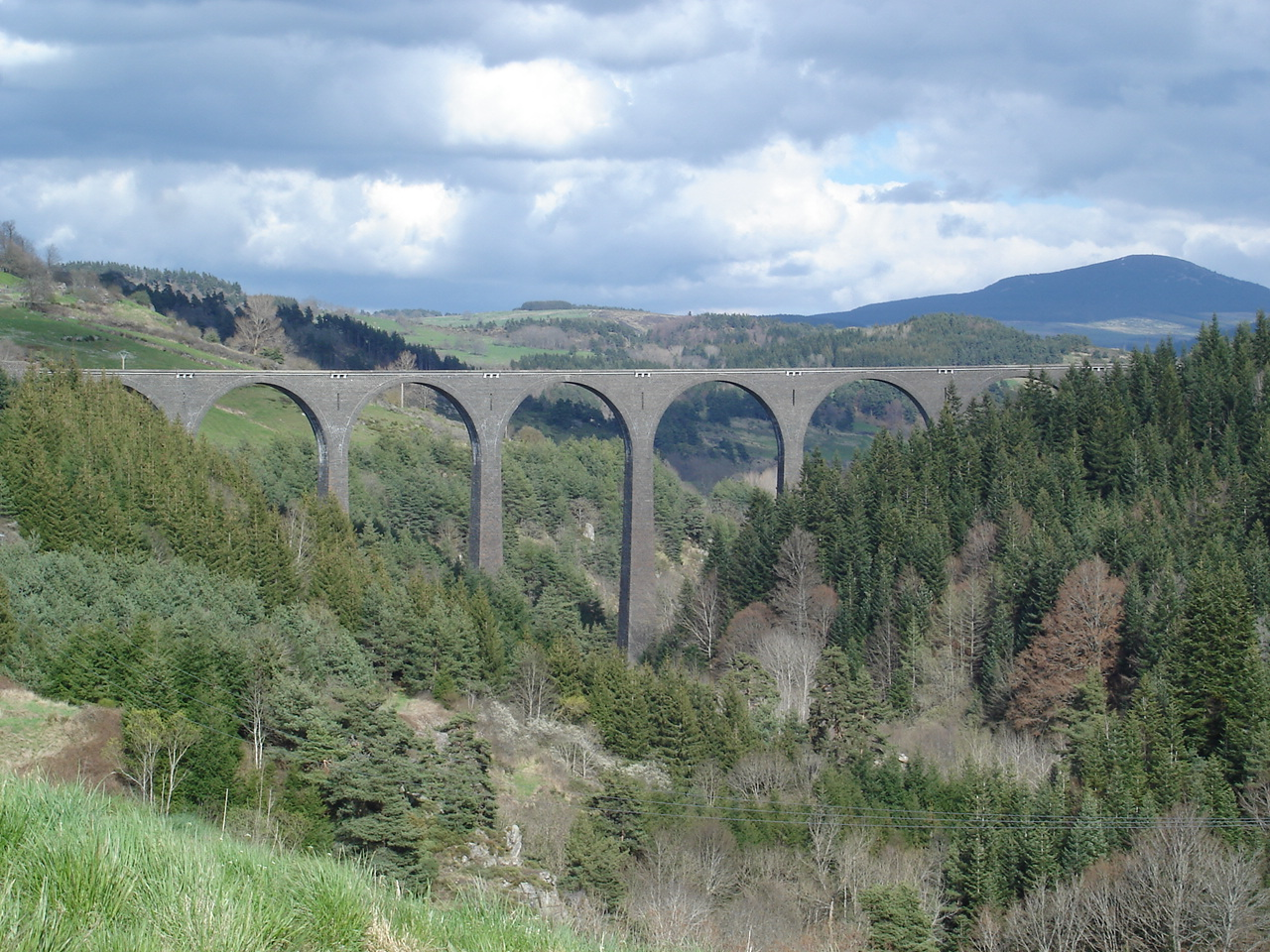
Recoumène viaduct, at Monastier-sur-Gazeille (1925)

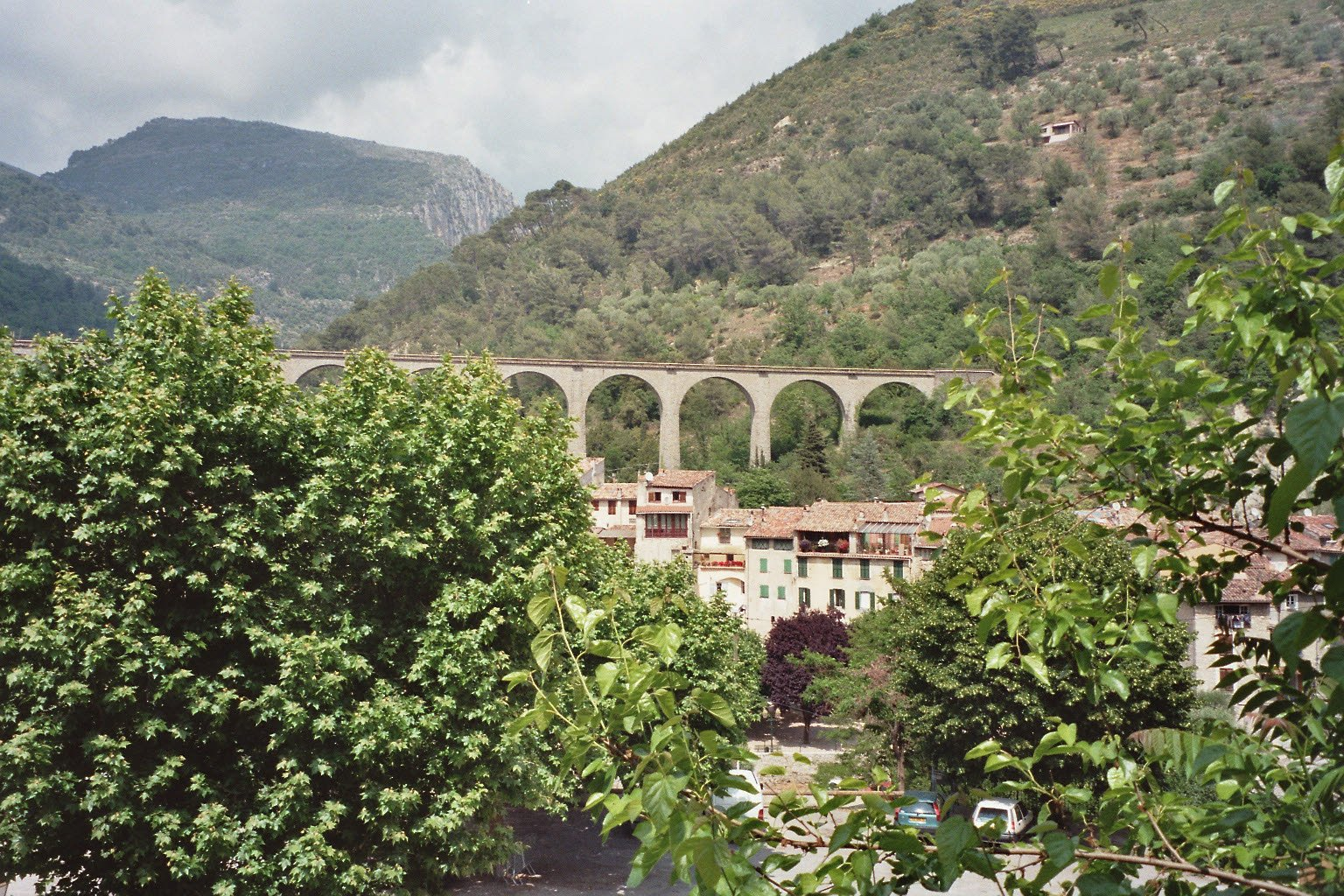
L'Escarène viaduct on the Tenda line (1927)

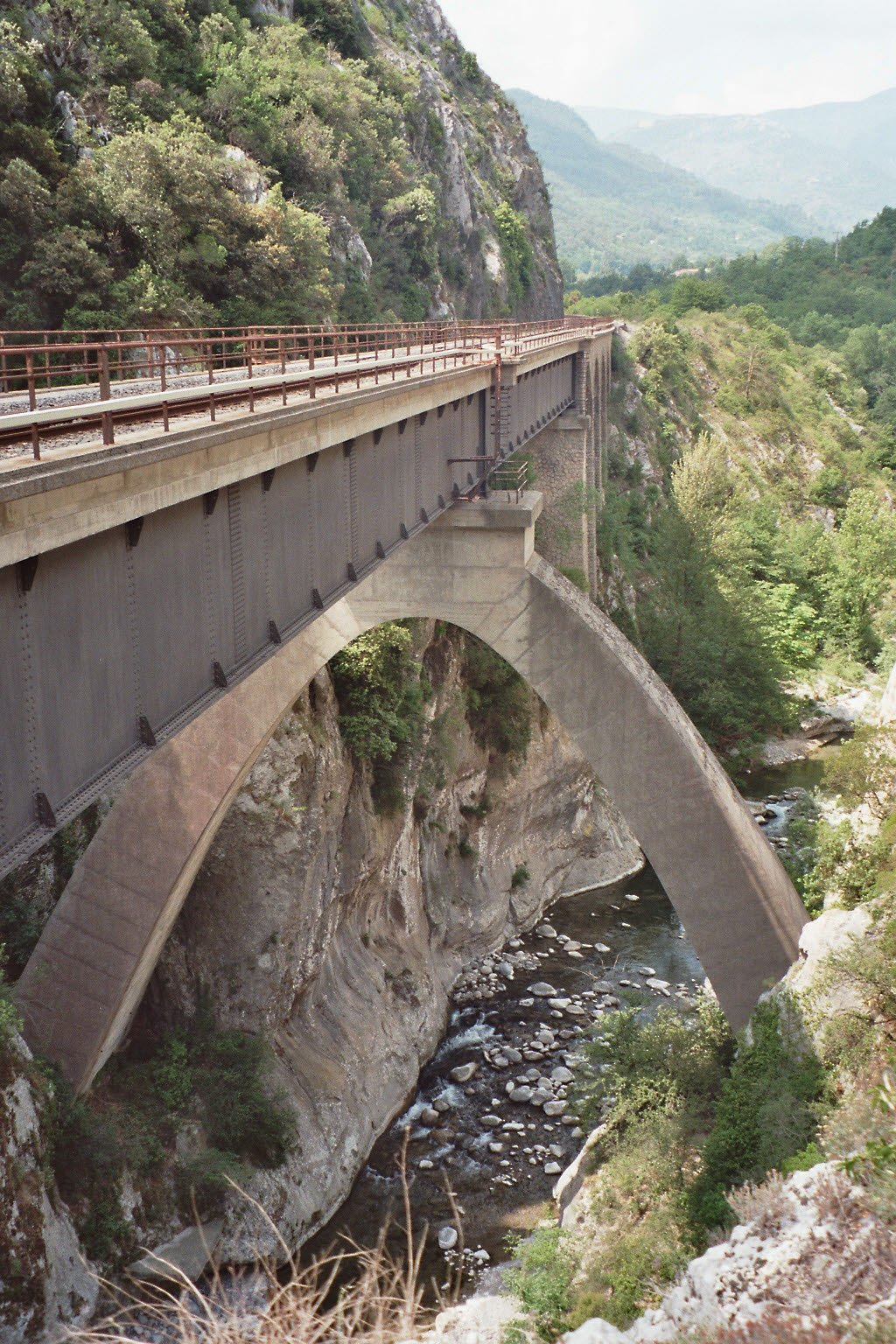
Bevera viaduct on the Tenda line (1927/1962)

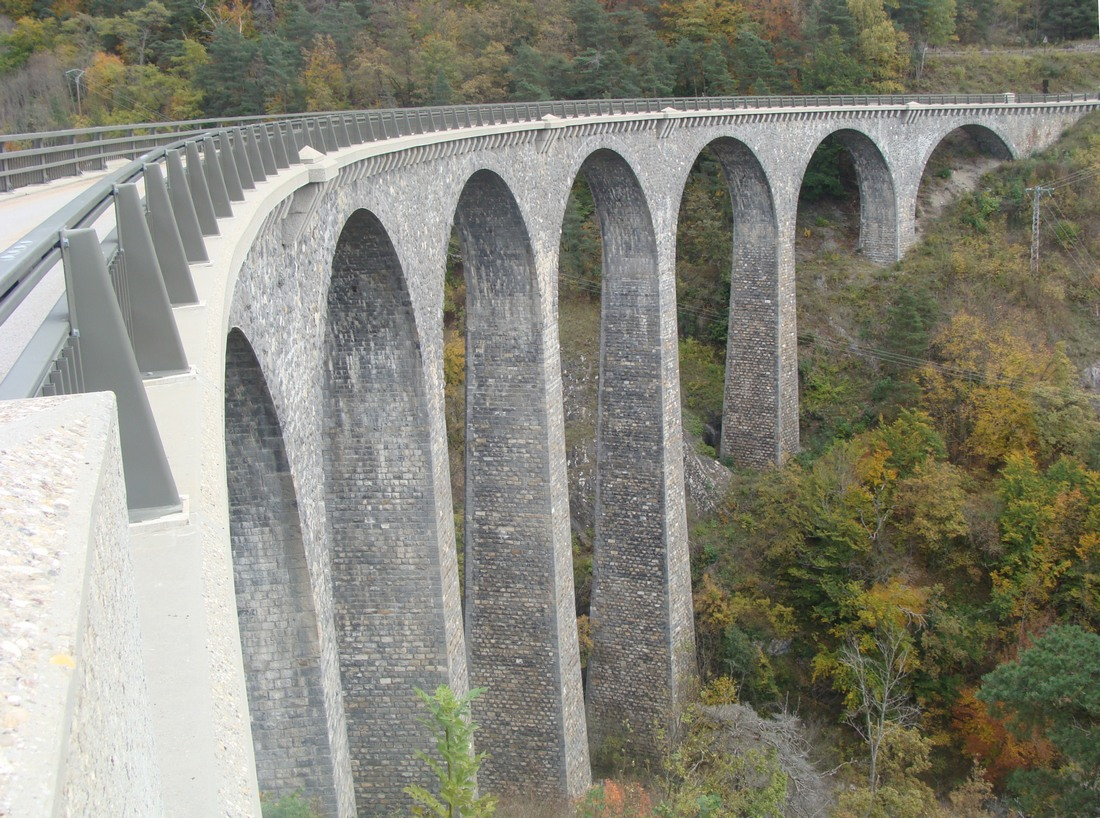
Bonne viaduct, at Valbonnais, Isère (1928)

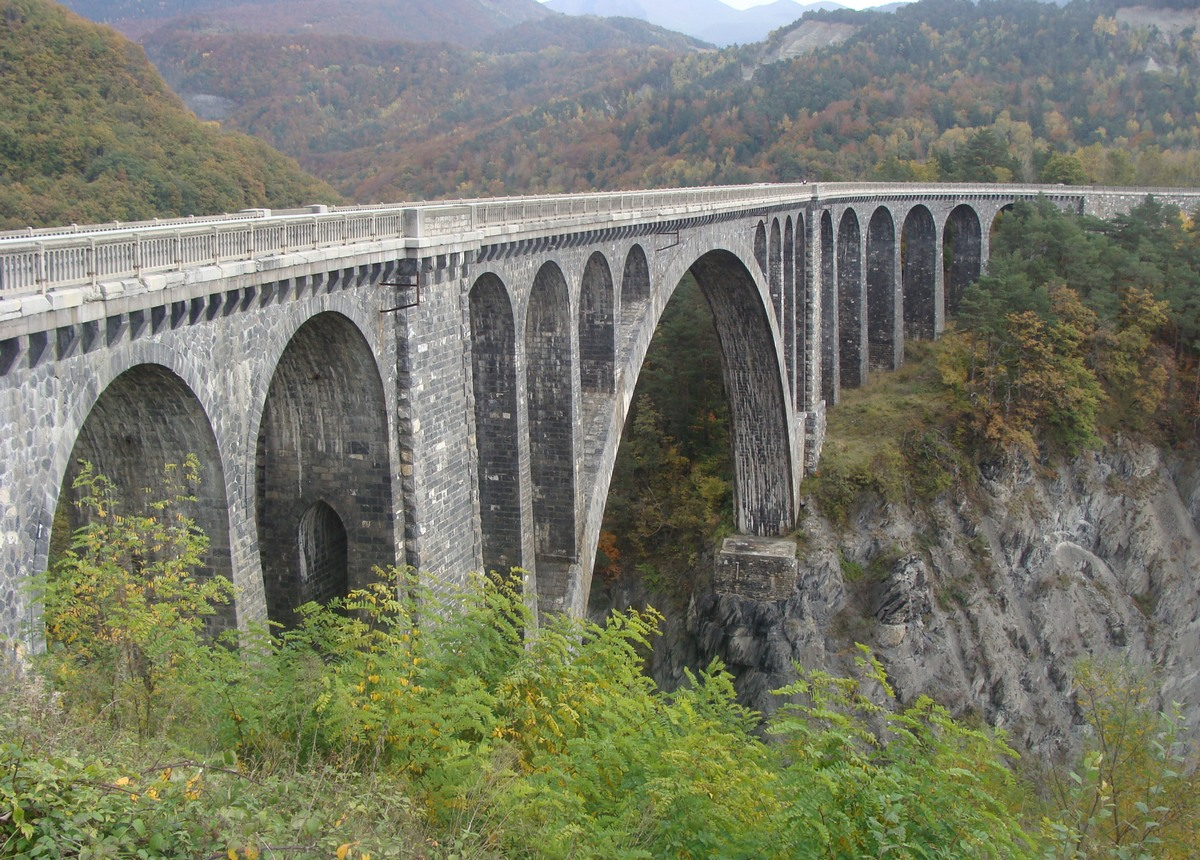
Roizonne viaduct, La Mure, Isère (1928)
