= Mother Marie-Anastasie =

French nun

Servant of God Marie-Anastasie Conduché OP
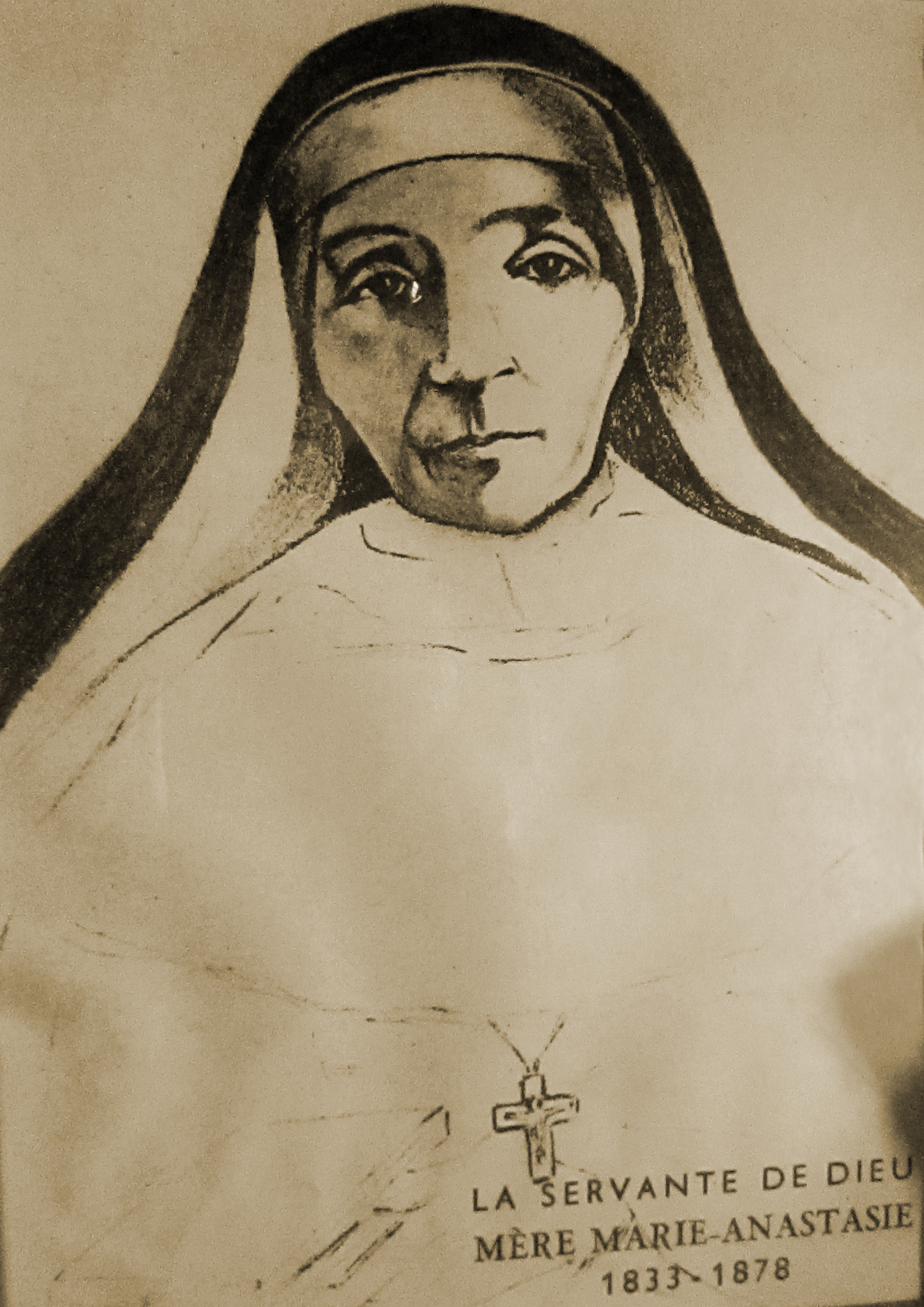
- Born: Marie-Alexandrine Conduché; 17 November 1833; Compeyre, Aveyron, France
- Died: 21 April 1878 (aged 44); Bor-et-Bar, Aveyron, France

Mother Marie-Anastasie, formerly Marie-Alexandrine Conduché, (17 November 1833 – 21 April 1878) had her initial formation with her Notre Dame Sisters of the Rodez diocese and later, she founded the Notre-Dame Dominican Congregation of Saint-Rosaire of Monteils.

== Early life ==
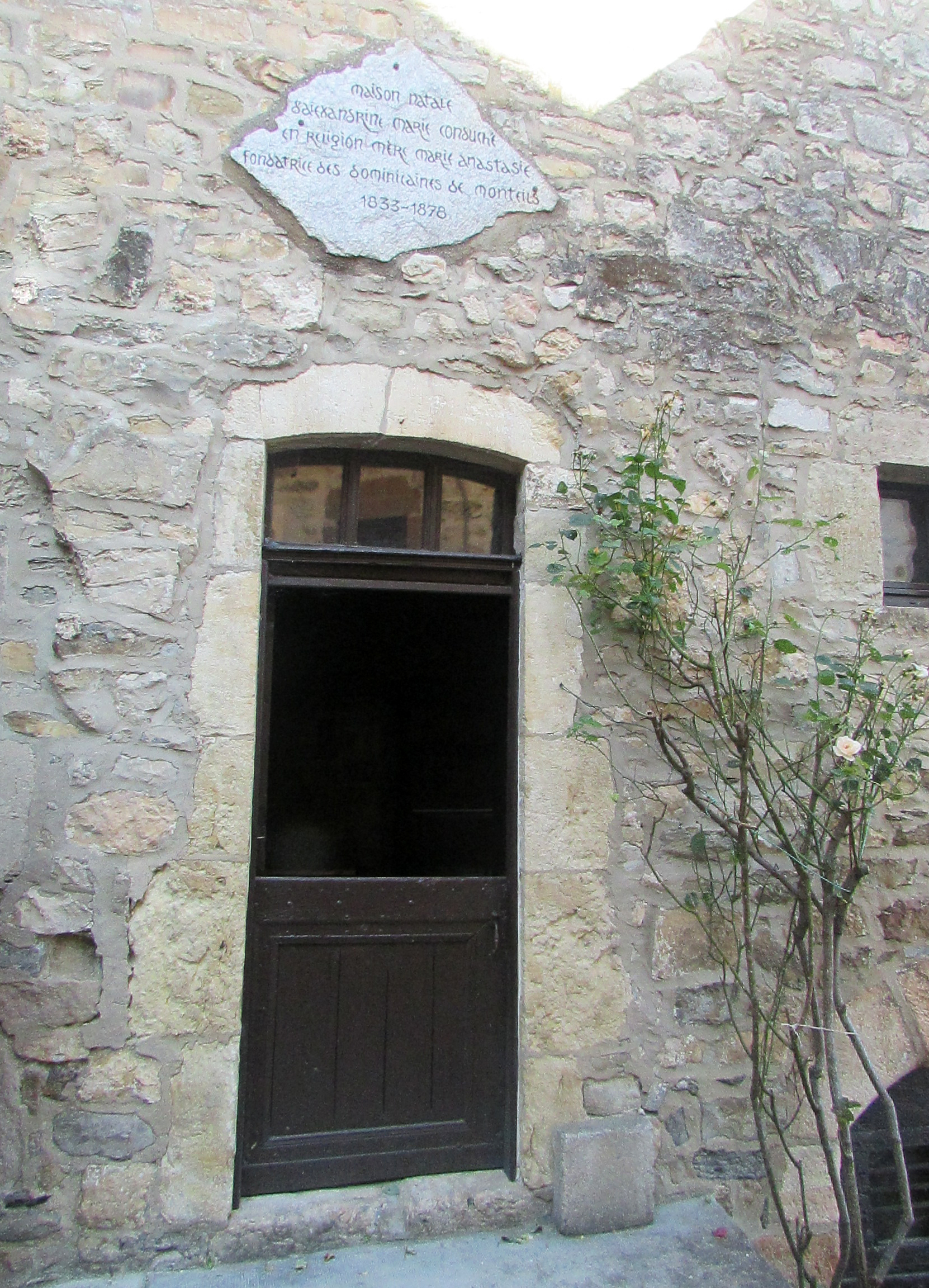
Home of Mother Marie-Anastasie in Compeyre, France, 2016

Alexandrine Conduché was born November 17, 1833, in Compeyre, France. From a poor, lower class household, she had a good education and religious background. Her maternal uncle was Father Artières, a priest in Tizac.

== Educator ==
She moved to Tizac to the parsonage of Father Artières when she was 13 years of age. Realizing her aptitude, he opened a school and Conduché taught the children. A relative of theirs, Father Jean Pierre Gavalda, concerned about the rate of illiteracy among the children of the area, decided to work with two intelligent, religious women to provide education. One was Conduché and the other was Virginie Gavalda, both of whom were called nieces. When she was sixteen, she and Father Gavalda began plans for Congregation of the Dominicans of Our Lady of the Rosary, with the plans to educate children and bring them into the faith in the process.

== Sisters of Notre Dame ==
The young women were sent by Father Gavalda to attend the Sisters of Notre Dame in Saint Julien d'Empare to round out their education. They arrived on March 10, 1849, at the religious community near Capdenac. On April 8, Conduché passed for the group of the postulants. Two months later, on June 13, she was called to wear the religious habit and adopted the name of Sister Marie-Anastasie, which means resurrection. Father Gavalda's niece was named Sister Marie Joseph.

== Congregation of the Dominicans of Our Lady of the Rosary, Bor ==
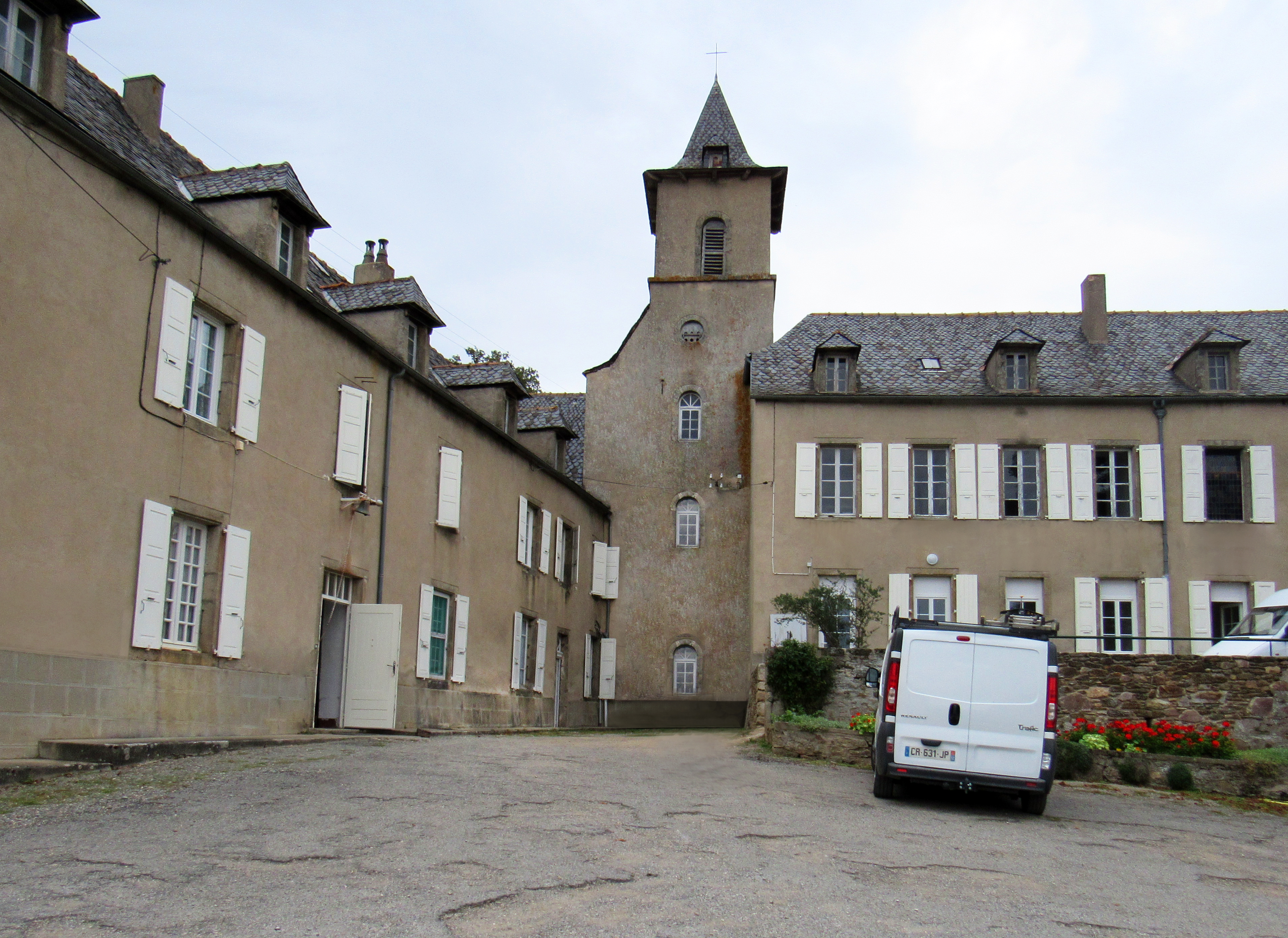
Convent at Bor, France, 2016

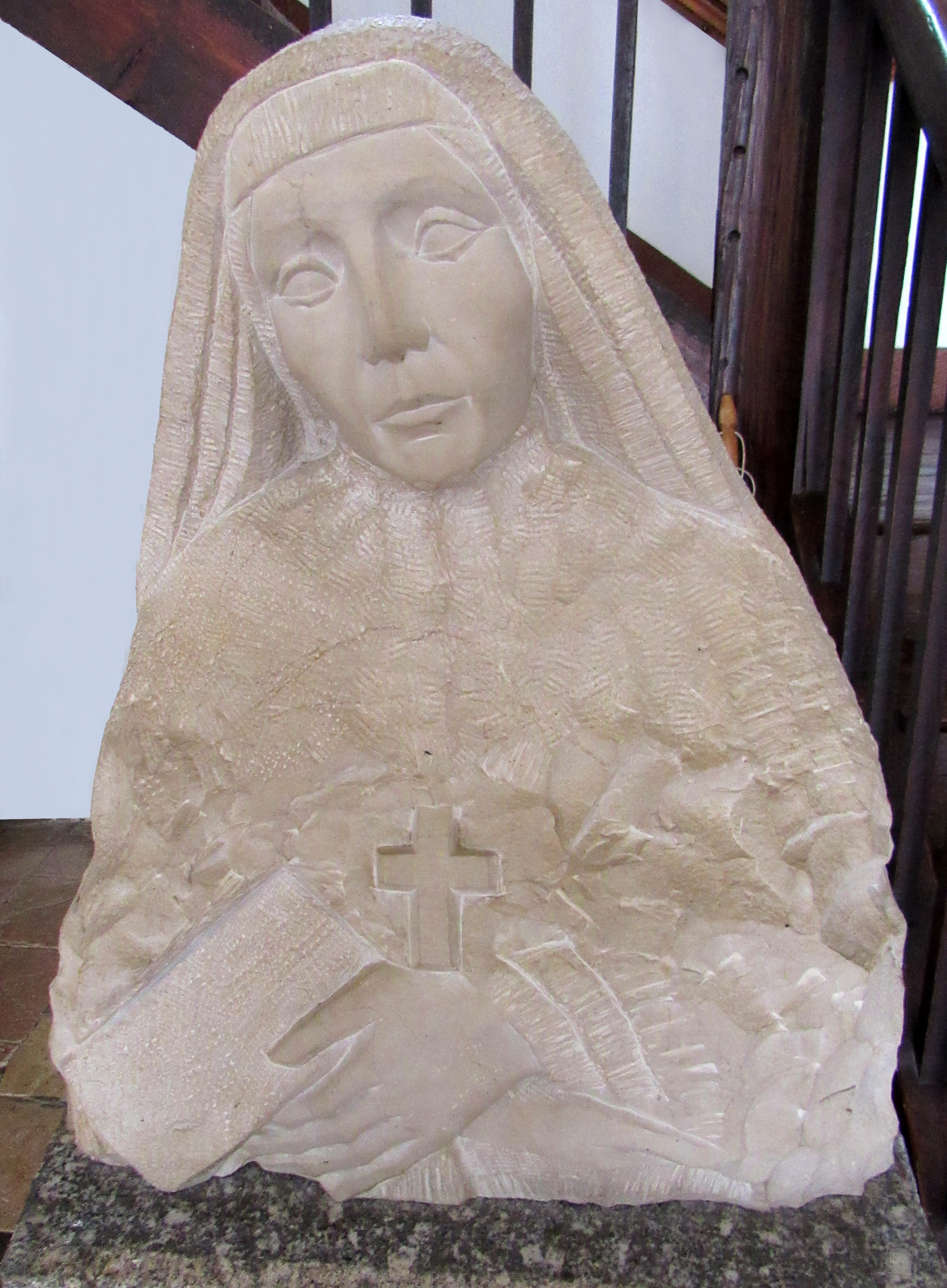
Sculpture of Mother Marie-Anastasie, Bor, France, 2016

Ready for classes to begin, Father Gavalda called the young women back to Bor after six months of formation. They returned on December 31, 1849, and classes began the next day and 24-year-old Sister Marie Joseph was named superior of the convent. The school was run by 17-year-old Sister Marie-Anastasie.

In that moment, the community was composed by the two sisters, Sister Saint-Joseph and Sister Marie-Anastasie, and by three aspirants who were waiting for their admission by Father Caubel. This moment marks the beginning of the Dominican Sisters Congregation of Our Lady of Rosario of Monteils, which started with the perseverance of Father Gavalda, priest of Bor. The Congregation was made official on March 30, 1850, by Jean François Croizier, bishop of Rodez, south of France, department of Aveyron.

On October 8, 1851, Sister Marie-Anastasie was named Master of Novices. She became the head of the convent when Sister Marie Joseph left the convent in September 1862. She was designated Prioress on October 10, 1862, by the Sisters of Notre Dame. At the feast of Our Lady of the Rosary in 1863, she took her perpetual vows. The Congregation of the Holy Rosary was then founded.

Anastasie modeled a deep spiritual life, one focused on prayer, charity, and contemplation, followed by action. She attracted young people to the welcoming convent. She also was concerned for those who were ill, and the sister visited parishioners when needed.

She went to Lourdes for a cure of her poor health when she was 42. Over her career, she opened 25 schools.

== Death and legacy ==
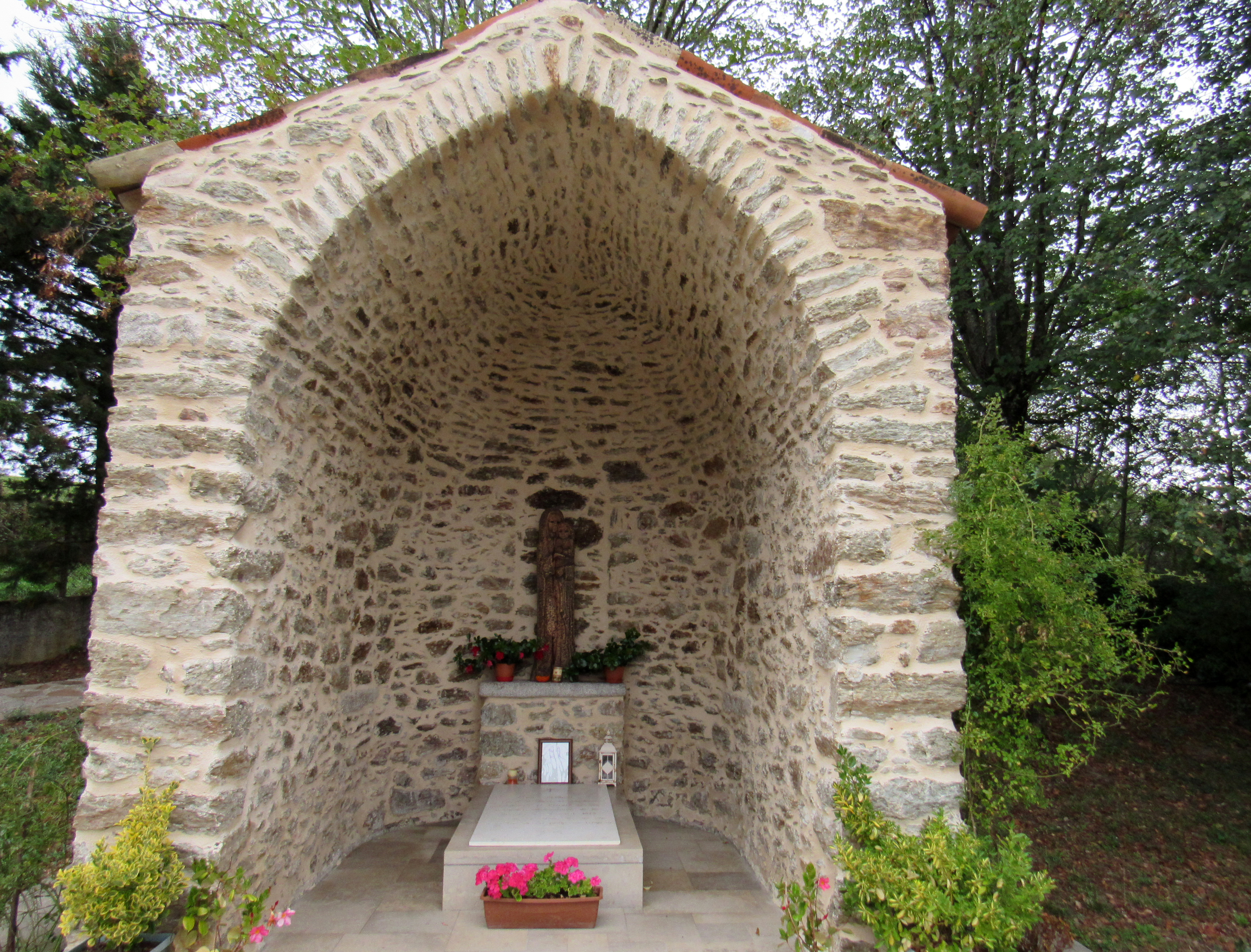
Tomb of Mother Marie-Anastasie, Bor, France, 2016

On Easter Sunday, April 21, 1878, Mother Marie-Anastasie died.

The communities continued to multiply themselves and the foundations happened in other countries bordering France: Italy, Belgium, Bulgaria, Spain. In 1885, a group of six Sisters from the Congregation crossed the Atlantic Ocean asked by the Dominican Order, and started it in the city of Uberaba, Brazil.
