= Auguste Fabre =

Auguste Fabre may refer to:

- Auguste Louis Antoine Fabre (1820–1878), French magistrate
- Auguste Marie Fabre (1833–1922), French industrialist
