= Dourbie =

River in southern France

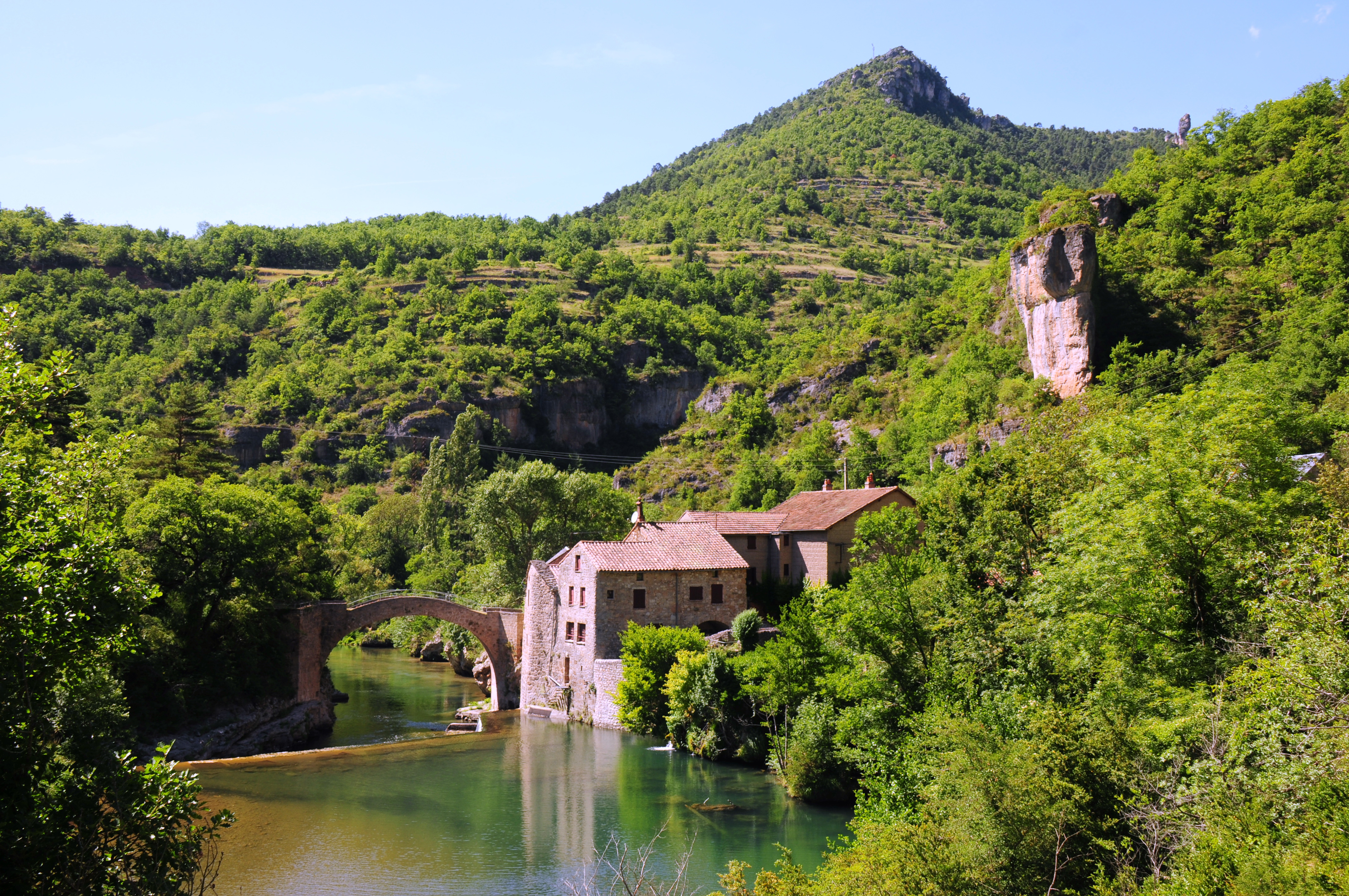
- Corp mill in the Dourbie gorges

- Location within France Location within Occitanie
- Native name: La Dourbie (French)

Location
- Country: France

Physical characteristics
- Source
  - location: Cévennes
- Mouth
  - location: Tarn
  - coordinates: 44°06′04″N 3°05′12″E
- Length: 72 km (45 mi)

Basin features
- Progression: Tarn→ Garonne→ Gironde estuary→ Atlantic Ocean

The Dourbie (French pronunciation: [duʁbi]; Occitan: Dorbia) is a 72 km (45 mi) long river in southern France. It is a left tributary of the Tarn. Its source is north of Le Vigan, in the Cévennes. It flows generally west through the following departments and towns:

- Gard: Dourbies
- Aveyron: Saint-Jean-du-Bruel, Nant

The Dourbie flows into the Tarn at Millau.
