= Canton of Millau-2 =

Coordinates: 44.10°N 3.08°E

- Canton
- Situation of the canton of Millau-2 in the department of Aveyron
- Country: France
- Region: Occitania
- Department: Aveyron
- No. of communes: {{{nbcomm}}}
- Population (2023): 14,052
- INSEE code: 1212

The canton of Millau-2 is an administrative division of the Aveyron department, southern France. It was created at the French canton reorganisation which came into effect in March 2015. Its seat is in Millau.

It consists of the following communes:

1. Aguessac
2. Compeyre
3. Millau (partly)
4. Nant
5. Paulhe
6. Saint-Jean-du-Bruel
