= Monteils, Aveyron =

Commune in Occitanie, France

Monteils
- Commune
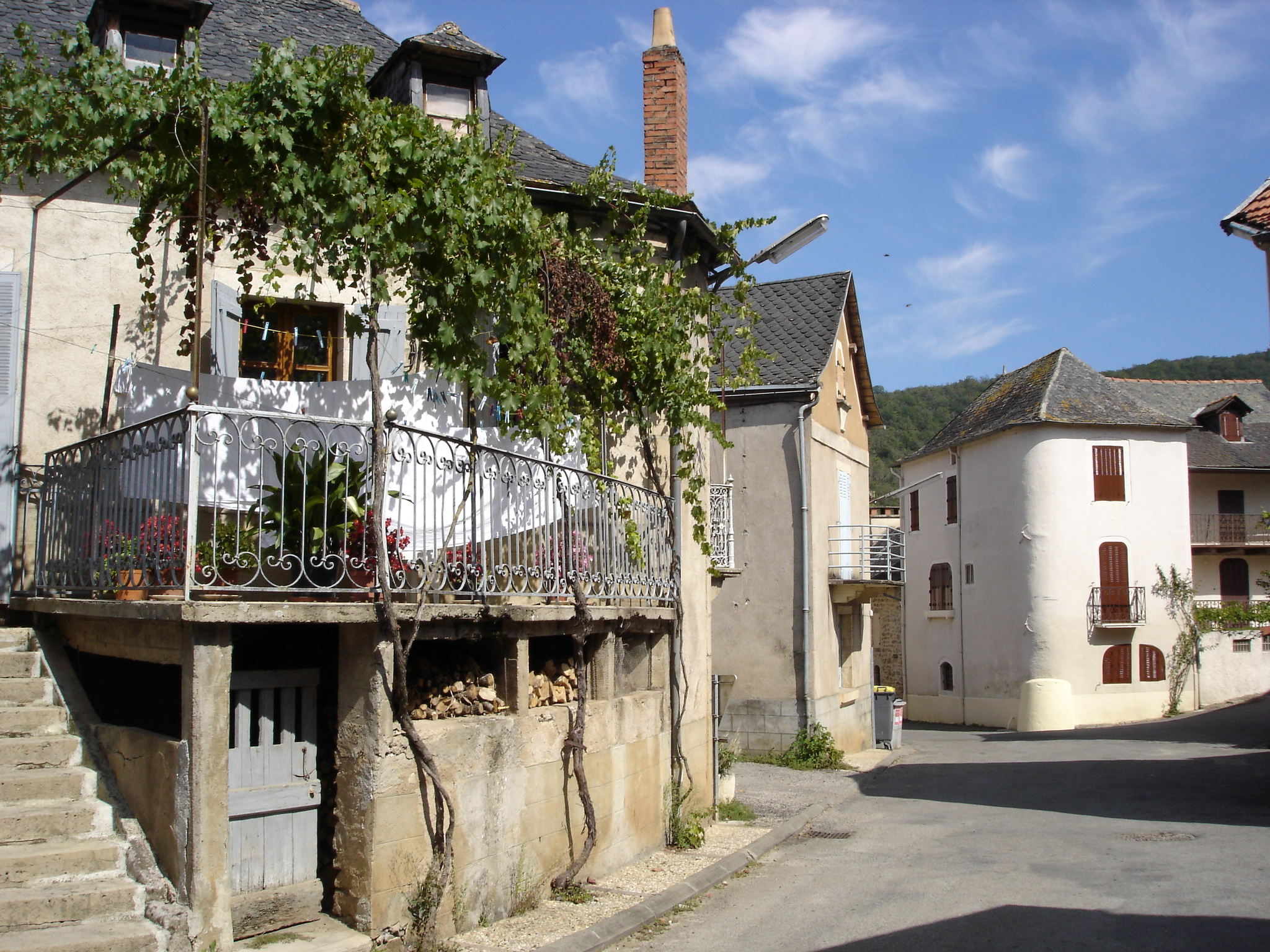
- A view within Monteils

- Coat of arms
- Location of Monteils
- Location within France Location within Occitanie
- Coordinates: 44°16′39″N 1°59′54″E
- Country: France
- Region: Occitania
- Department: Aveyron
- Arrondissement: Villefranche-de-Rouergue
- Canton: Aveyron et Tarn

Government
  - Mayor (2020–2026): Michel Delpech
- Area^{1}: 17.19 km^{2} (6.64 sq mi)
- Elevation: 234 m (768 ft)
- Highest elevation: 487 m (1,598 ft)
- Lowest elevation: 210 m (690 ft)
- Population (2023): 461
  - Density: 26.8/km^{2} (69.5/sq mi)
- Time zone: UTC+01:00 (CET)
  - Summer (DST): UTC+02:00 (CEST)
- INSEE/Postal code: 12150 /12200
- ^{1} French Land Register data, which excludes lakes, ponds, glaciers > 1 km^{2} (0.386 sq mi or 247 acres) and river estuaries.

Monteils (French pronunciation: [mɔ̃tɛj]; Occitan: Montelhs) is a commune in the Aveyron department in southern France.

== Population ==
Historical population
Year	Pop.	±% p.a.
1968	437	—
1975	404	−1.12%
1982	424	+0.69%
1990	490	+1.82%
1999	465	−0.58%
2007	523	+1.48%
2012	559	+1.34%
2017	542	−0.62%
2023	461	−2.66%
Source: INSEE

== See also ==
- Communes of the Aveyron department

== Notable people ==
- Mother Marie-Anastasie
