= Marie-Laurence Quatrefages =

French Righteous Among the Nations (1896–1976)

Mayor of Saint-Jean-du-Bruel
- In office 1947–1965

Personal details
- Born: Marie-Laurence Egrefeuille; 18 October 1896
- Died: 17 December 1976 (aged 80)
- Spouse: Mssr. Quatrefages (died 1942)
- Children: 11

Marie-Laurence Quatrefages (née Egrefeuille; 18 October 1896 – 17 December 1976) was a French storekeeper and politician who is recognized as Righteous Among the Nations by Yad Vashem for hiding a Jewish man in her home during the Holocaust. Following the war, she served as the mayor of Saint-Jean-du-Bruel from 1947 until 1965.

== Biography ==
Marie-Laurence Quatrefages (née Egrefeuille) was born on 18 October 1896. She and her husband were storekeepers in the town of Saint-Jean-du-Bruel in southern France, and they had eleven children; their eldest son Urbain was a priest in a neighboring town. Quatrefages's husband died in 1942.

Following the German occupation of Vichy France in late 1942, Quatrefages became acquainted with Chaim Widerspan, a Polish Jew who had been living in France since 1937. Widerspan, along with his Catholic wife and their children, had been hiding in southern France since the 1940 invasion. When local militias formed in 1943, Quatrefages and her family agreed to hide Widerspan in a storeroom on the second-floor of their house. During the evenings, Widerspan would eat dinner with the Quatrefages family, and would take nightly walks in the front yard dressed in clerical robes, imitating Urbain. His wife, who lived in a nearby apartment and worked as a seamstress, would visit her husband in the Quatrefages home under the guise of work. He later joined the French Resistance. After the war, the Widerspans (gallicized as Vidersan) remained in close contact with the Quatrefages family.

In 1947, Quatrefages was elected mayor of Saint-Jean-du-Bruel, serving for three terms until 1965. During her tenure, she oversaw the construction of new water and sanitation systems, as well as the widening of roads. She died on 17 December 1976.

On 25 May 2011, Quatrefages was recognized as Righteous Among the Nations by Yad Vashem. The local school was named in dedication of her in 2019.
