= Aguessac =

Commune in Occitanie, France

- Commune
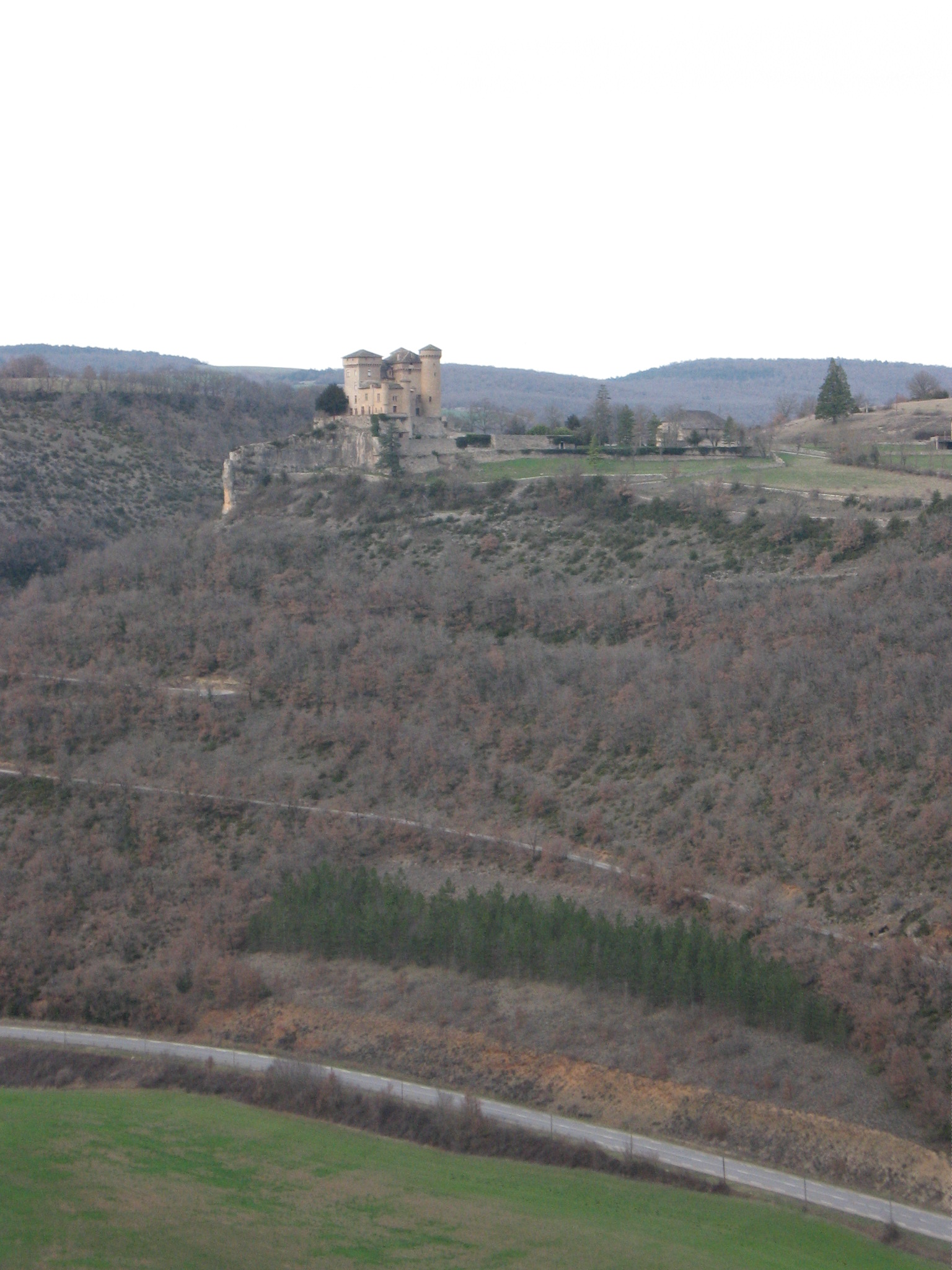
- Chateau of Cabrières

- Coat of arms
- Location of Aguessac
- Location within France Location within Occitanie
- Coordinates: 44°09′27″N 3°05′57″E
- Country: France
- Region: Occitania
- Department: Aveyron
- Arrondissement: Millau
- Canton: Millau-2
- Intercommunality: Millau Grands Causses

Government
  - Mayor (2020–2026): Anne Pailhas
- Area^{1}: 17.64 km^{2} (6.81 sq mi)
- Elevation: 372 m (1,220 ft)
- Highest elevation: 869 m (2,851 ft)
- Lowest elevation: 367 m (1,204 ft)
- Population (2023): 929
  - Density: 52.7/km^{2} (136/sq mi)
- Time zone: UTC+01:00 (CET)
  - Summer (DST): UTC+02:00 (CEST)
- INSEE/Postal code: 12002 /12520
- ^{1} French Land Register data, which excludes lakes, ponds, glaciers > 1 km^{2} (0.386 sq mi or 247 acres) and river estuaries.

Aguessac (French pronunciation: [aɡsak]; Occitan: Agaçac) is a commune in the Aveyron department in the Occitanie region of southern France.

== Geography ==
Aguessac is just south of the Massif Central and is located some 4 km north of Millau and 20 km south of Severac-le-Chateau. It can be accessed by the D29 road branching off the D911 in the west and continuing into the commune and south to the village. There is also the D809 coming from Millau in the south passing through the village and continuing north to join the A75 autoroute. The D907 goes north-east from the village to Riviere-sur-Tarn and the D167 goes west by a tortuous mountain route to Saint-Germain. The famous Millau Viaduct (Viaduc de la Garrigue) is on the A75 autoroute immediately to the west of the commune. The commune is mixed forest and high country farmland.

There are many streams flowing through the commune: the Ruisseau de Malbose forms the northern border of the commune, the Lumansonesque forms the eastern border flowing into the Tarn which forms the southern part of the eastern border. The Lumansonesque is fed by the Barbade with its numerous tributaries which forms part of the western border before flowing across the commune and joining the Lumansonesque.

== Administration ==
List of Successive Mayors of Aguessac

Mayors from the French Revolution to 1926

From	To	Name
1793	1795	Guillaume Assayrous
1795	1799	Alexandre Baldet
1800	1806	Jean Amans Barascut
1807	1816	Jean Joseph Quezac
1816	1822	Jean Magloire
1823	1827	Jean Antoine Fabre
1826	1829	Jean Baptiste Colliere
1829	1830	François Julien
1830	1836	Jean-Joseph Quezac
1836	1840	Camille Triadou
1840	1847	Jean-Joseph Quezac
1847	1848	Camille Triadou
1848	1852	Jean-Antoine Alegre
1852	1865	Jean-Pierre Decombis
1865	1876	René Demnes
1876	1878	Victor Vivier
1878	1881	Jean-Joseph Demnes
1881	1884	Jean-Joseph Quezac
1884	1904	Sylvain Baldeyrou
1904	1912	Camille Benoit
1912	1925	Louis Rascalou
1925	1926	Amédé Baldeyrou

Mayors from 1926

From	To	Name
1926	1947	Victor Arlabosse
1947	1959	Paul Bringuier
1959	1965	Jules Fau
1965	1977	Julien de Roquetaillade
1977	1983	Louis Vales
1983	1989	Julien de Roquetaillade
1989	1995	Louis Vales
1995	2008	Jacques Commayras
2008	2020	Aimé Heral
2020	2026	Anne Pailhas

== Population ==
The inhabitants of the commune are known as Nagassols or Nagassoles in French.

Historical population

Year	Pop.	±% p.a.
1793	575	—
1800	629	+1.29%
1831	748	+0.56%
1836	771	+0.61%
1841	763	−0.21%
1846	773	+0.26%
1851	760	−0.34%
1856	747	−0.34%
1861	789	+1.10%
1866	822	+0.82%
1872	753	−1.45%
1876	1,165	+11.53%
1881	786	−7.57%
1886	775	−0.28%
1891	709	−1.76%
1896	644	−1.90%
1901	668	+0.73%
1906	686	+0.53%

Year	Pop.	±% p.a.
1911	631	−1.66%
1921	597	−0.55%
1926	579	−0.61%
1931	645	+2.18%
1936	608	−1.17%
1946	596	−0.20%
1954	712	+2.25%
1962	731	+0.33%
1968	709	−0.51%
1975	714	+0.10%
1982	615	−2.11%
1990	811	+3.52%
1999	833	+0.30%
2007	842	+0.13%
2012	858	+0.38%
2017	867	+0.21%
2023	929	+1.16%

Source: EHESS and INSEE

== Economy ==
The economy of the commune is agricultural and characterized by traditional agriculture based on farming for the production of calves and lambs for fattening. There are twelve farms in this commune.

== Sites and monuments ==
- The Chateau of Cabrières

== Notable people linked to the commune ==
- Emma Calvé (1858-1942) at the height of her fame bought the Chateau of Cabrières in 1884 before selling it to a manufacturer of gloves a few years later.

== See also ==
- Cantons of the Aveyron department
