= Auguste Louis Antoine Fabre =

French politician and magistrate

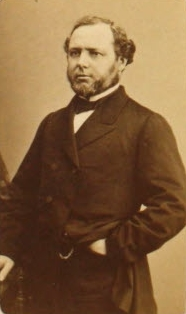
- Born: 13 April 1820; Compeyre, Aveyron, France
- Died: 15 January 1878 (aged 57); Les Matelles, Hérault, France
- Occupations: Lawyer, politician

Auguste Louis Antoine Fabre (13 April 1820 – 15 January 1878) was a French magistrate who was briefly a national deputy during the Second French Empire.

== Life ==
Auguste Louis Antoine Fabre was born on 13 April 1820 in Compeyre, Aveyron. He was a distant relative of Denis Auguste Affre (1793–1848), the Archbishop of Paris. He became a magistrate. He was an adviser to the imperial court of Nîmes when he was elected on 21 August 1864 as a member of the legislative body for the 3rd district of the Gard department. The administration openly supported his candidature, and brought the mine workers of Grand-Combe and Bességes to vote for him in brigades under the eyes of their managers. The opposition protested in vain. Fabre sat with the dynastic majority, where he did little. He was appointed Attorney General in 1868, and resigned his parliamentary seat. Fabre died on 15 January 1878 in Les Matelles, Hérault.

== Sources ==
- Robert, Adolphe; Cougny, Gaston (1891). "Auguste, Louis, Antoine FABRE". Dictionnaire des parlementaires français de 1789 à 1889 (in French).
