= Paulhe =

Commune in Occitanie, France

- Commune
- Location of Paulhe
- Location within France Location within Occitanie
- Coordinates: 44°09′11″N 3°06′16″E
- Country: France
- Region: Occitania
- Department: Aveyron
- Arrondissement: Millau
- Canton: Millau-2
- Intercommunality: Millau Grands Causses

Government
  - Mayor (2020–2026): Gilbert Faucher
- Area^{1}: 4.72 km^{2} (1.82 sq mi)
- Elevation: 260 m (850 ft)
- Highest elevation: 846 m (2,776 ft)
- Lowest elevation: 366 m (1,201 ft)
- Population (2023): 358
  - Density: 75.8/km^{2} (196/sq mi)
- Time zone: UTC+01:00 (CET)
  - Summer (DST): UTC+02:00 (CEST)
- INSEE/Postal code: 12178 /12520
- ^{1} French Land Register data, which excludes lakes, ponds, glaciers > 1 km^{2} (0.386 sq mi or 247 acres) and river estuaries.

Paulhe (French pronunciation: [poj]) is a commune in the Aveyron department in southern France.

== Population ==
Historical population
| Year | Pop. | ±% p.a. |
|---|---|---|
| 1968 | 150 | — |
| 1975 | 171 | +1.89% |
| 1982 | 231 | +4.39% |
| 1990 | 288 | +2.80% |
| 1999 | 312 | +0.89% |
| 2007 | 351 | +1.48% |
| 2012 | 360 | +0.51% |
| 2017 | 389 | +1.56% |
| 2023 | 358 | −1.37% |
Source: INSEE

== See also ==
- Communes of the Aveyron department
