= Nant, Aveyron =

Commune in Occitanie, France

Nant
- Commune
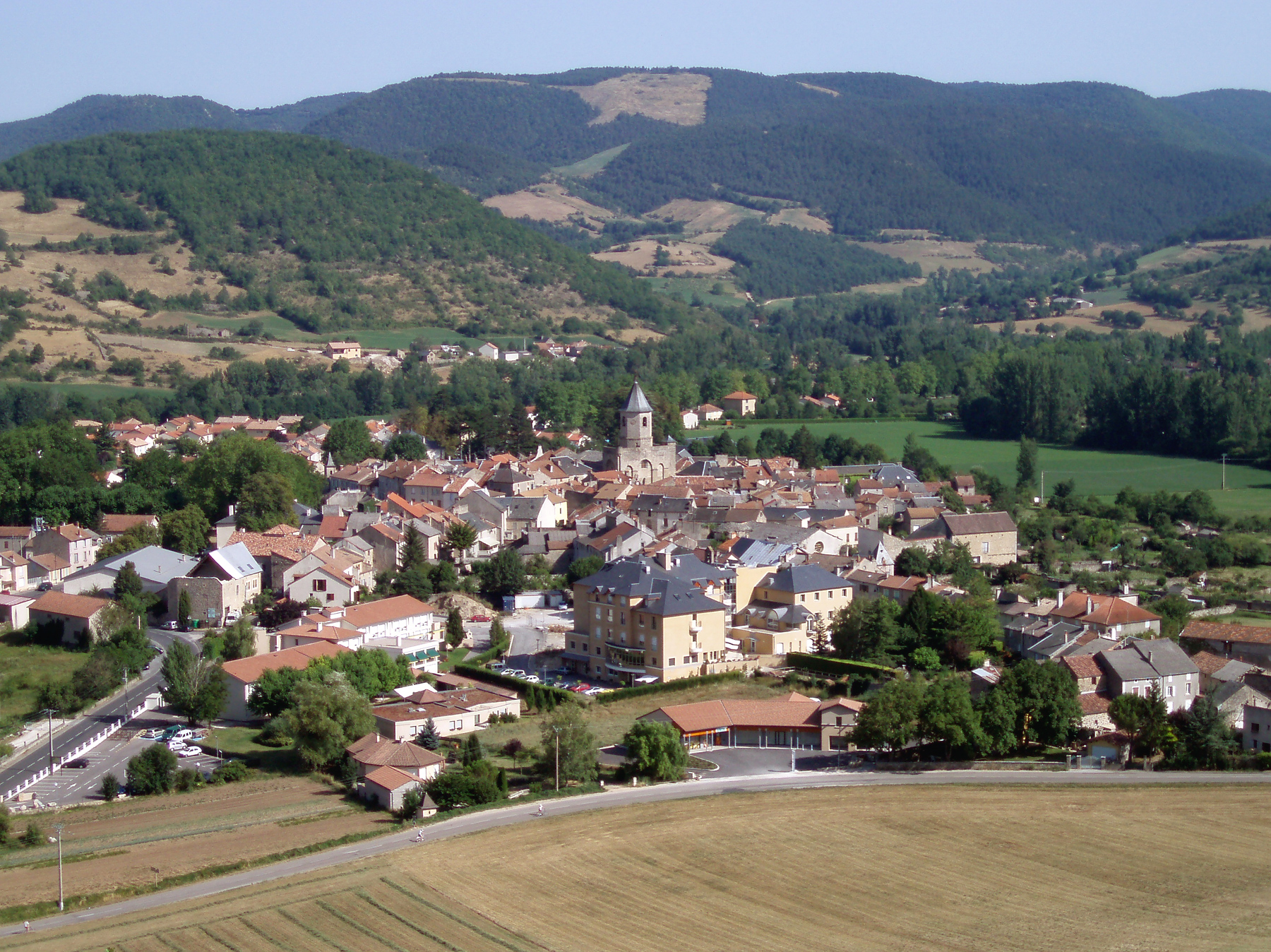
- A general view of Nant

- Coat of arms
- Location of Nant
- Location within France Location within Occitanie
- Coordinates: 44°01′18″N 3°18′02″E
- Country: France
- Region: Occitania
- Department: Aveyron
- Arrondissement: Millau
- Canton: Millau-2
- Intercommunality: Larzac et Vallées

Government
  - Mayor (2020–2026): Richard Fiol
- Area^{1}: 109.4 km^{2} (42.2 sq mi)
- Elevation: 500 m (1,600 ft)
- Highest elevation: 926 m (3,038 ft)
- Lowest elevation: 421 m (1,381 ft)
- Population (2023): 1,026
  - Density: 9.378/km^{2} (24.29/sq mi)
- Time zone: UTC+01:00 (CET)
  - Summer (DST): UTC+02:00 (CEST)
- INSEE/Postal code: 12168 /12230
- ^{1} French Land Register data, which excludes lakes, ponds, glaciers > 1 km^{2} (0.386 sq mi or 247 acres) and river estuaries.

Nant (French pronunciation: [nɑ̃]) is a commune in the Aveyron department in southern France.

== Geography ==
The commune is located in the southern part of the Massif Central. It includes a part of the Larzac plateau and its foothills, the valley of the Durzon river and a part of the valley of the Dourbie river.

== History ==
In the 10th century, monks drained the marshy soil of the Durzon valley where it joins the Dourbie, using a network of stone-lined canals. They started agriculture in the district. In 926 AD they built a monastery at the confluence of the two watercourses. In 1135 the monastery became an abbey. The economy and the local population grew and the village of Nant grew up around the abbey.

During the Wars of Religion the cloister and the monastic buildings were destroyed, but the village had a period of prosperity again during the second half of the 17th century. The large market buildings in the main square hosted local fairs and a flourishing market. An ecclesiastical college was founded in the village in 1665, until the abbey was suppressed in 1771 by royal decree. The Eglisle-Abbatiale of Saint Pierre de Nant contains stained glass windows by the artist Jean Hugo, who had a family home in the nearby Durzon valley.

== Population ==
Historical population
Year	Pop.	±% p.a.
1968	1,016	—
1975	959	−0.82%
1982	972	+0.19%
1990	773	−2.82%
1999	846	+1.01%
2007	916	+1.00%
2012	934	+0.39%
2017	1,004	+1.46%
2023	1,026	+0.36%
Source: INSEE

== Economy ==
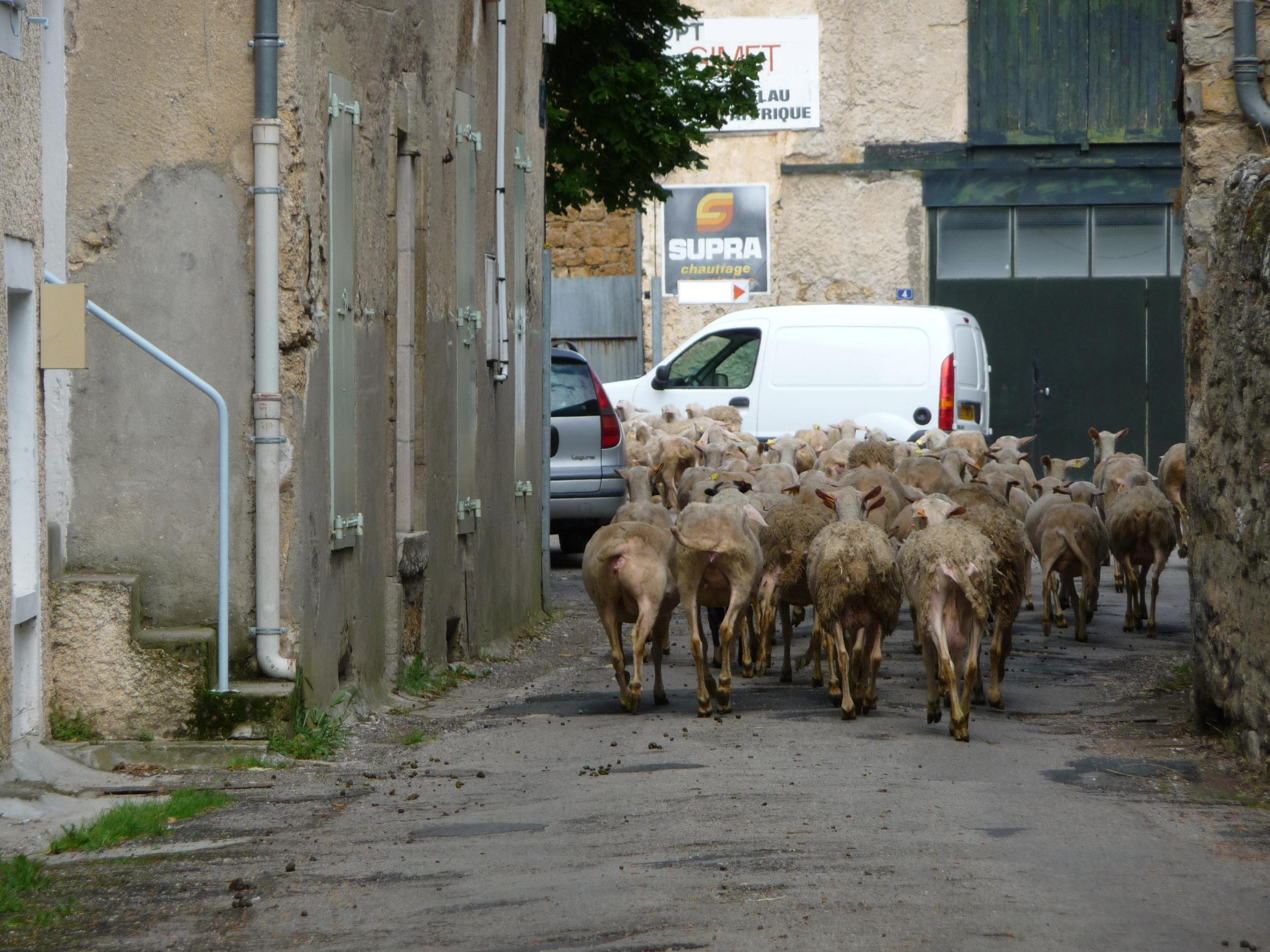
Herd of dairy sheep in the village

The local economy is characterised by traditional agriculture based on sheep farming for the production of roquefort, pérail and tome cheeses, and for the production of calves and lambs intended for fattening. There is some diversification towards aquaculture, beekeeping, the production of firewood and rural tourism.

Local farmers sell their produce in the open air market in the village. (The market hall is currently occupied by the terrace of a café). Merchants selling other food items also attend the market. A market exclusively for farmers is being planned.

Leisure activities also influence the local economy: horse-riding, holiday rental accommodation, camping, hiking, mountain biking and both coarse and game fishing. There is a municipal swimming pool. The hunting season of large wild animals opens each year on the 15th of August.

Two retirement homes are also located in the commune.

== See also ==
- Communes of the Aveyron department

== Photo gallery ==
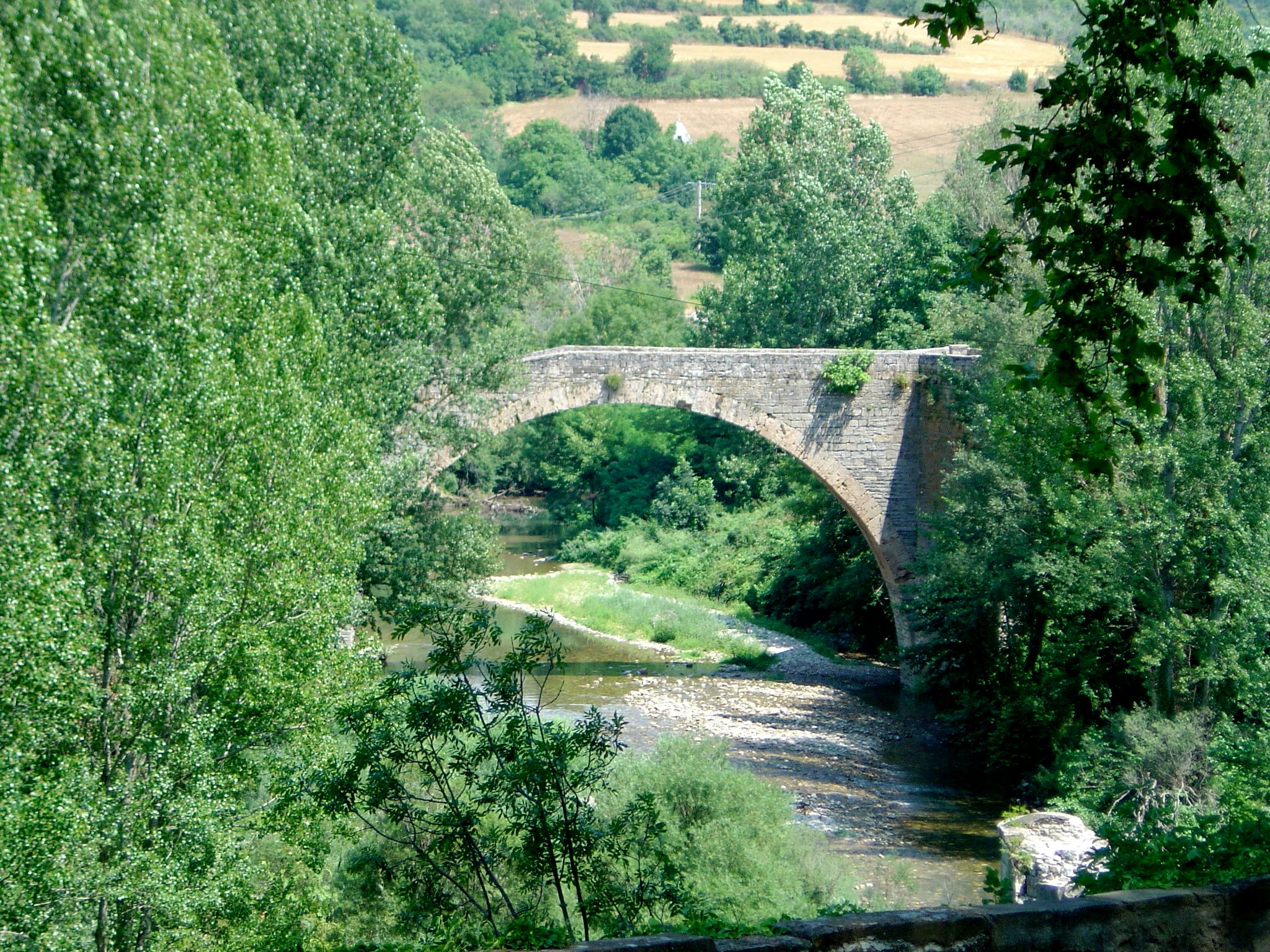
Pont de la Prade in Nant

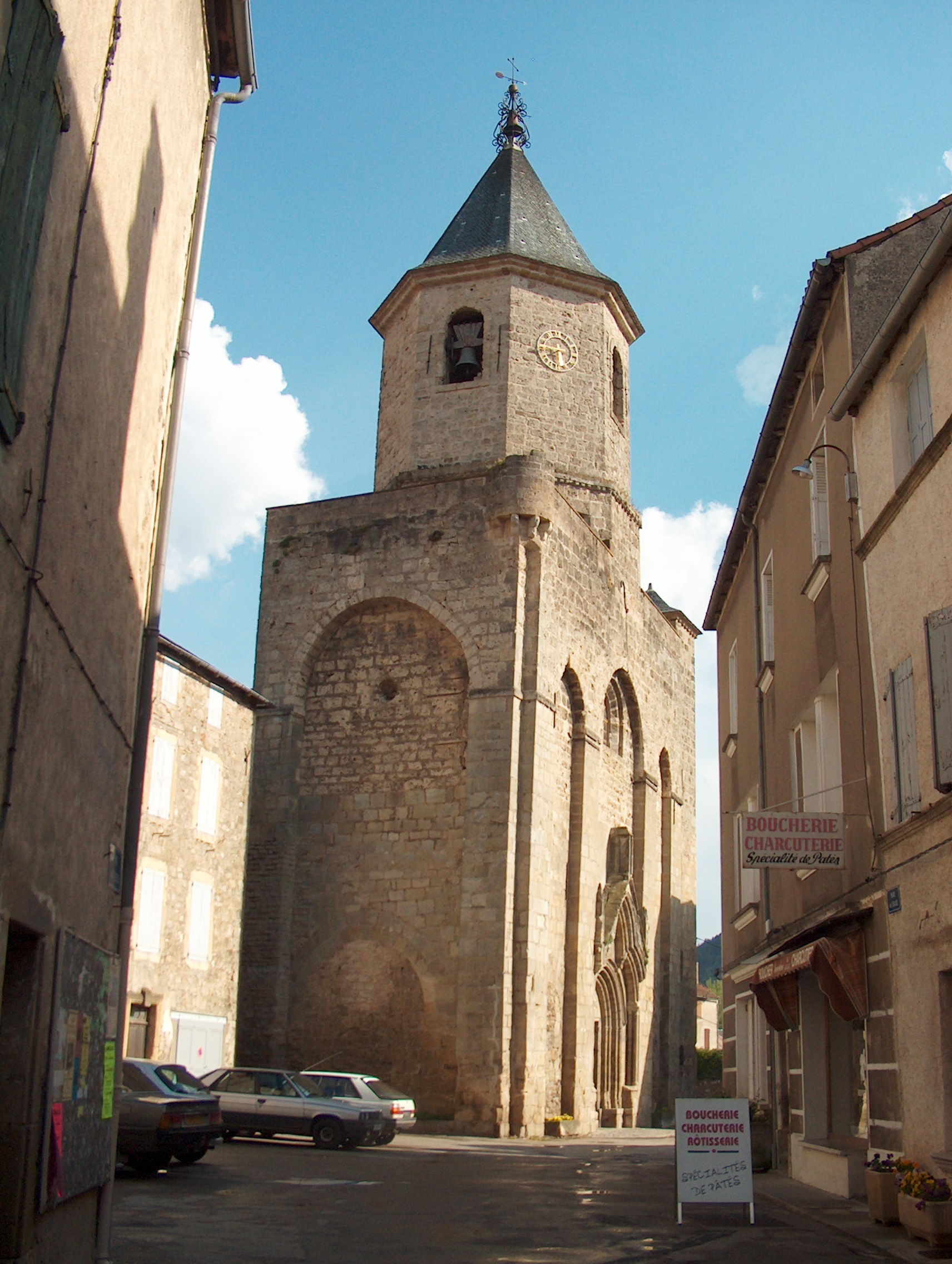
Nant: The fortified belltower of the church

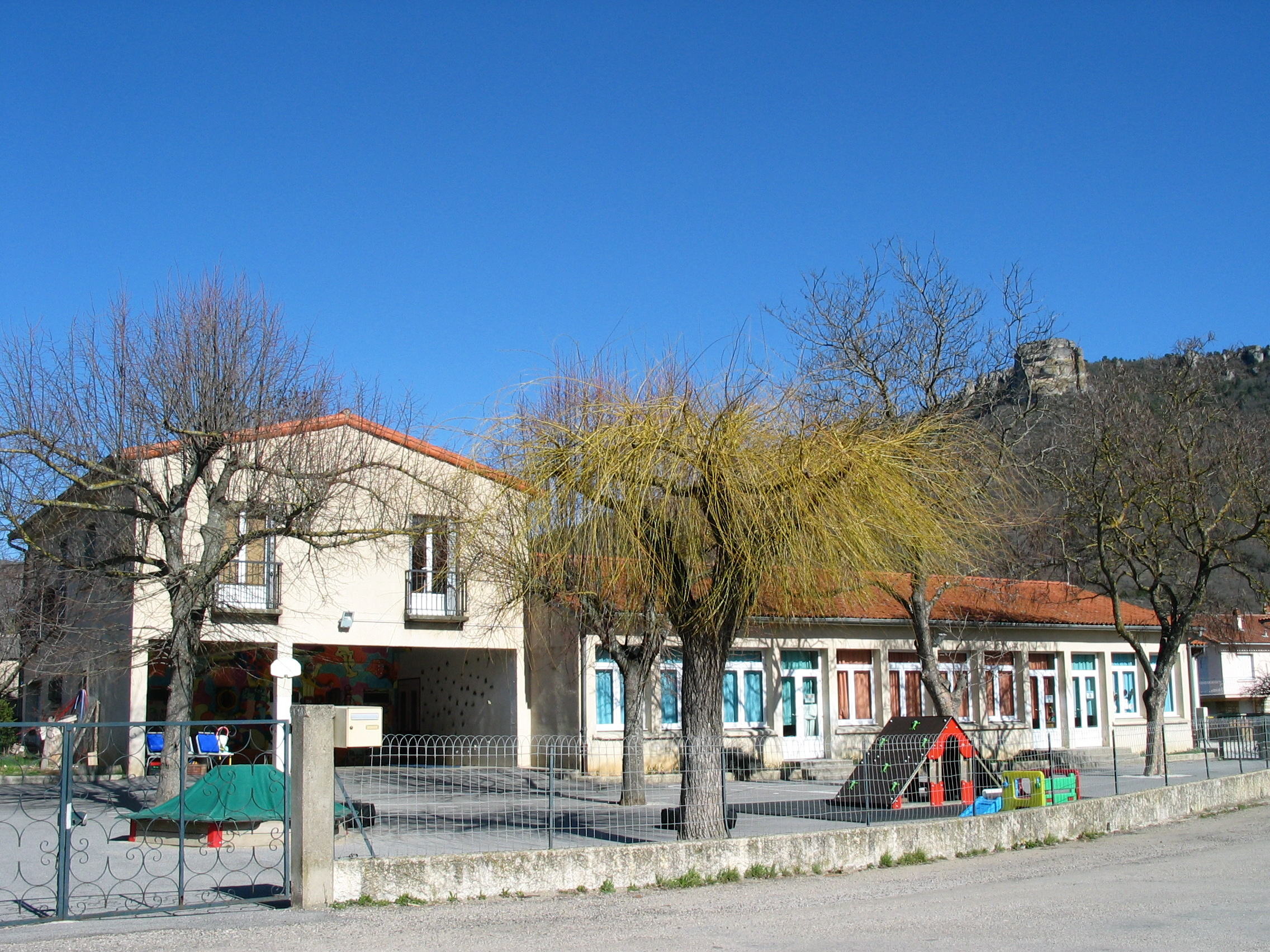
The primary school in Nant, named « Roc Nantais » (with the "Roc Nantais" in the background
