= Saint-Jean-du-Bruel =

Commune in Occitanie, France

- Commune
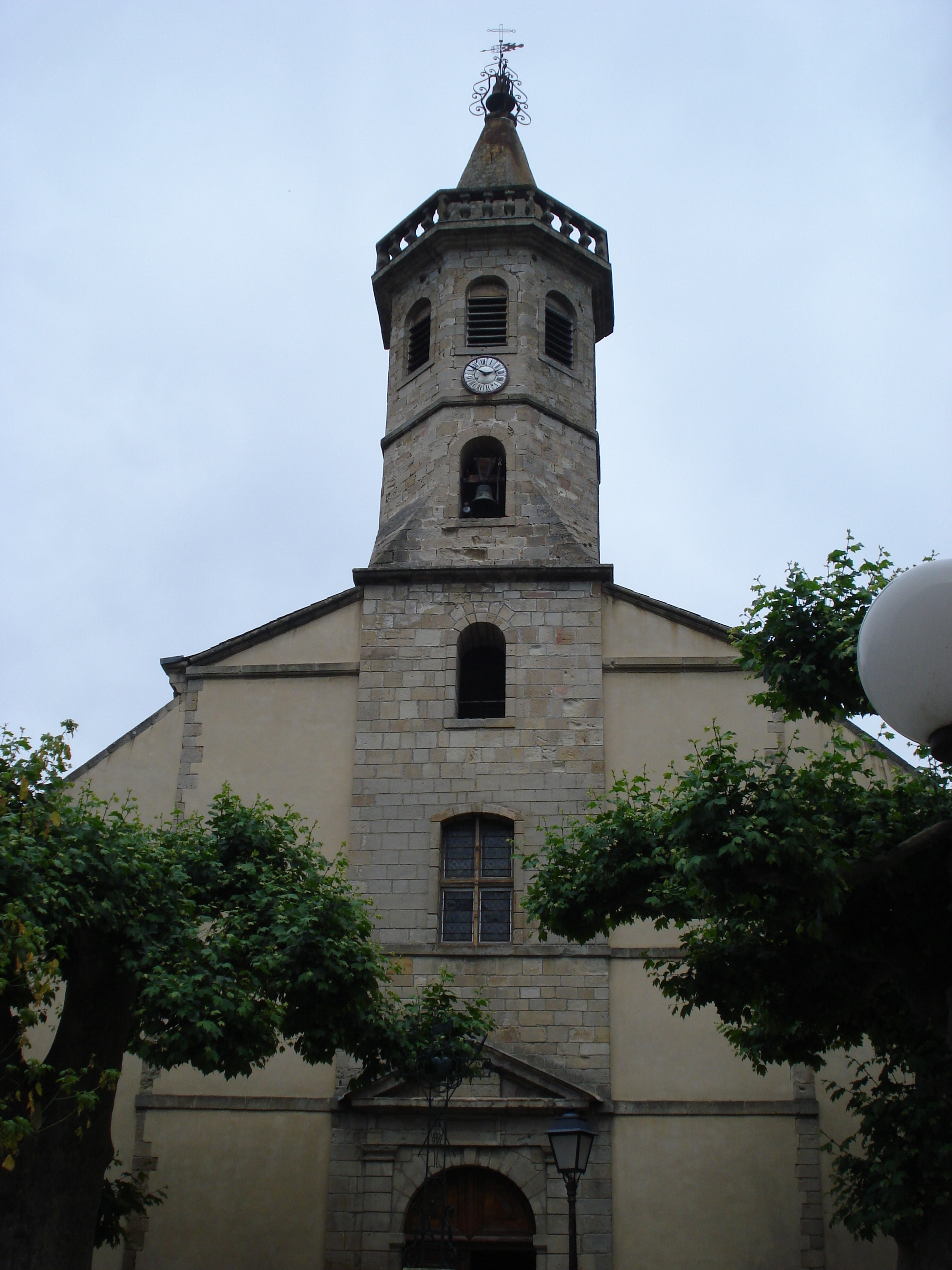
- The church in Saint-Jean-du-Bruel

- Coat of arms
- Location of Saint-Jean-du-Bruel
- Location within France Location within Occitanie
- Coordinates: 44°01′25″N 3°21′41″E
- Country: France
- Region: Occitania
- Department: Aveyron
- Arrondissement: Millau
- Canton: Millau-2
- Intercommunality: Larzac et Vallées

Government
  - Mayor (2023–2026): Claude Vidal
- Area^{1}: 37.23 km^{2} (14.37 sq mi)
- Elevation: 520 m (1,710 ft)
- Highest elevation: 1,339 m (4,393 ft)
- Lowest elevation: 492 m (1,614 ft)
- Population (2023): 639
  - Density: 17.2/km^{2} (44.5/sq mi)
- Time zone: UTC+01:00 (CET)
  - Summer (DST): UTC+02:00 (CEST)
- INSEE/Postal code: 12231 /12230
- ^{1} French Land Register data, which excludes lakes, ponds, glaciers > 1 km^{2} (0.386 sq mi or 247 acres) and river estuaries.

Saint-Jean-du-Bruel (French pronunciation: [sɛ̃ ʒɑ̃ dy bʁyɛl]; Occitan: Sent Joan del Bruèlh) is a commune in the Aveyron department in southern France.

Marie-Laurence Quatrefages was the mayor of Saint-Jean-du-Bruel from 1947 until 1965.

== Population ==
Historical population
| Year | Pop. | ±% p.a. |
|---|---|---|
| 1968 | 833 | — |
| 1975 | 827 | −0.10% |
| 1982 | 843 | +0.27% |
| 1990 | 820 | −0.35% |
| 1999 | 642 | −2.68% |
| 2007 | 690 | +0.91% |
| 2012 | 655 | −1.04% |
| 2017 | 702 | +1.40% |
| 2023 | 639 | −1.55% |
Source: INSEE

== See also ==
- Communes of the Aveyron department
