= Bor-et-Bar =

Commune in Occitanie, France

- Commune
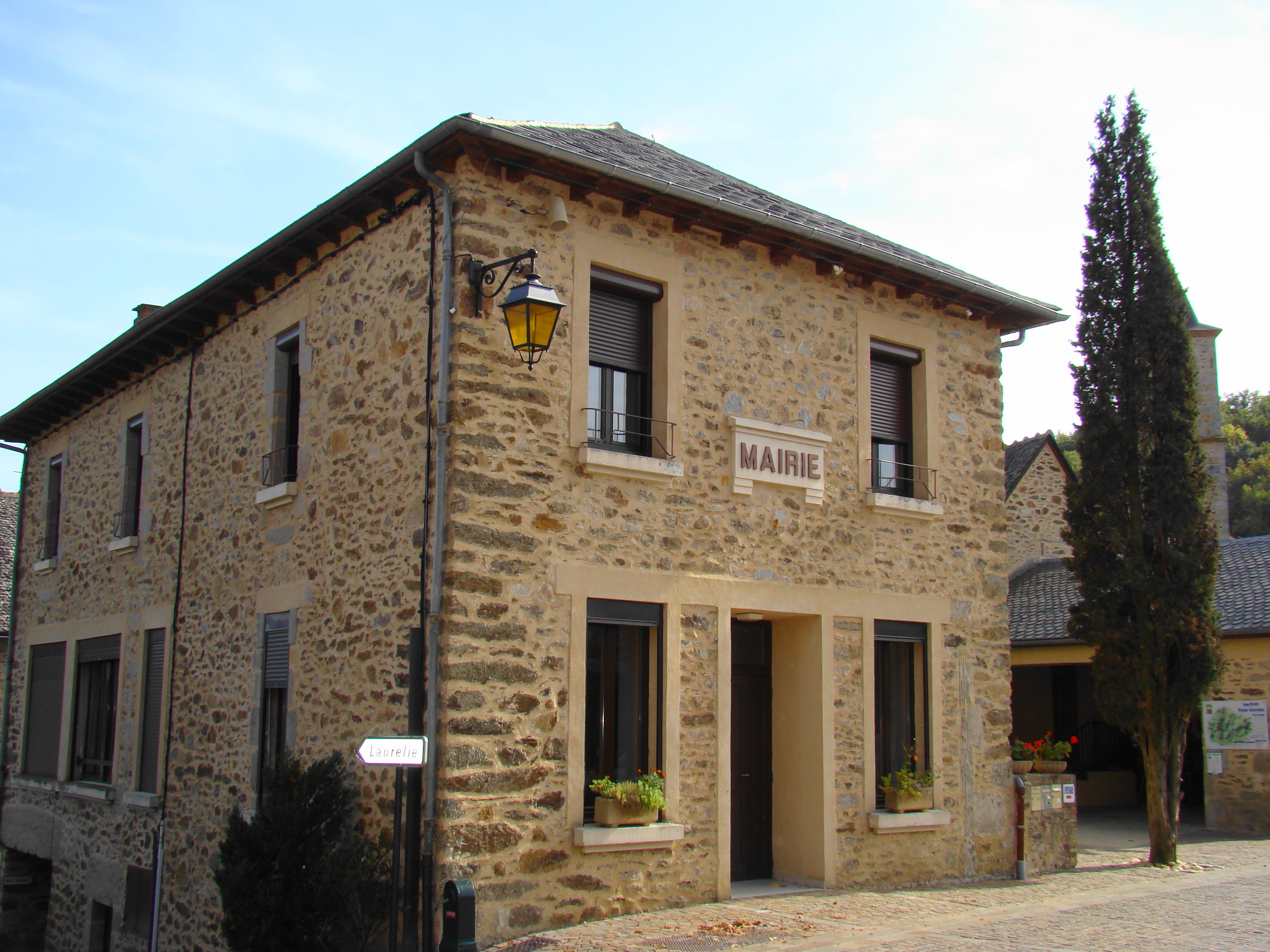
- The town hall in Bor-et-Bar
- Location of Bor-et-Bar
- Location within France Location within Occitanie
- Coordinates: 44°11′21″N 2°04′35″E
- Country: France
- Region: Occitania
- Department: Aveyron
- Arrondissement: Villefranche-de-Rouergue
- Canton: Aveyron et Tarn

Government
  - Mayor (2020–2026): Dominique Guy
- Area^{1}: 12.92 km^{2} (4.99 sq mi)
- Elevation: 290 m (950 ft)
- Highest elevation: 528 m (1,732 ft)
- Lowest elevation: 172 m (564 ft)
- Population (2023): 206
  - Density: 15.9/km^{2} (41.3/sq mi)
- Time zone: UTC+01:00 (CET)
  - Summer (DST): UTC+02:00 (CEST)
- INSEE/Postal code: 12029 /12270
- ^{1} French Land Register data, which excludes lakes, ponds, glaciers > 1 km^{2} (0.386 sq mi or 247 acres) and river estuaries.

Bor-et-Bar (French pronunciation: [bɔʁ e baʁ]; Occitan: Vòrs e Bar) is a commune in the Aveyron department in southern France.

== Population ==
Historical population
Year	Pop.	±% p.a.
1968	315	—
1975	285	−1.42%
1982	241	−2.37%
1990	206	−1.94%
1999	203	−0.16%
2007	187	−1.02%
2012	190	+0.32%
2017	194	+0.42%
2023	206	+1.01%
Source: INSEE

== See also ==
- Communes of the Aveyron department
