= Compeyre =

Commune in Occitanie, France

- Commune
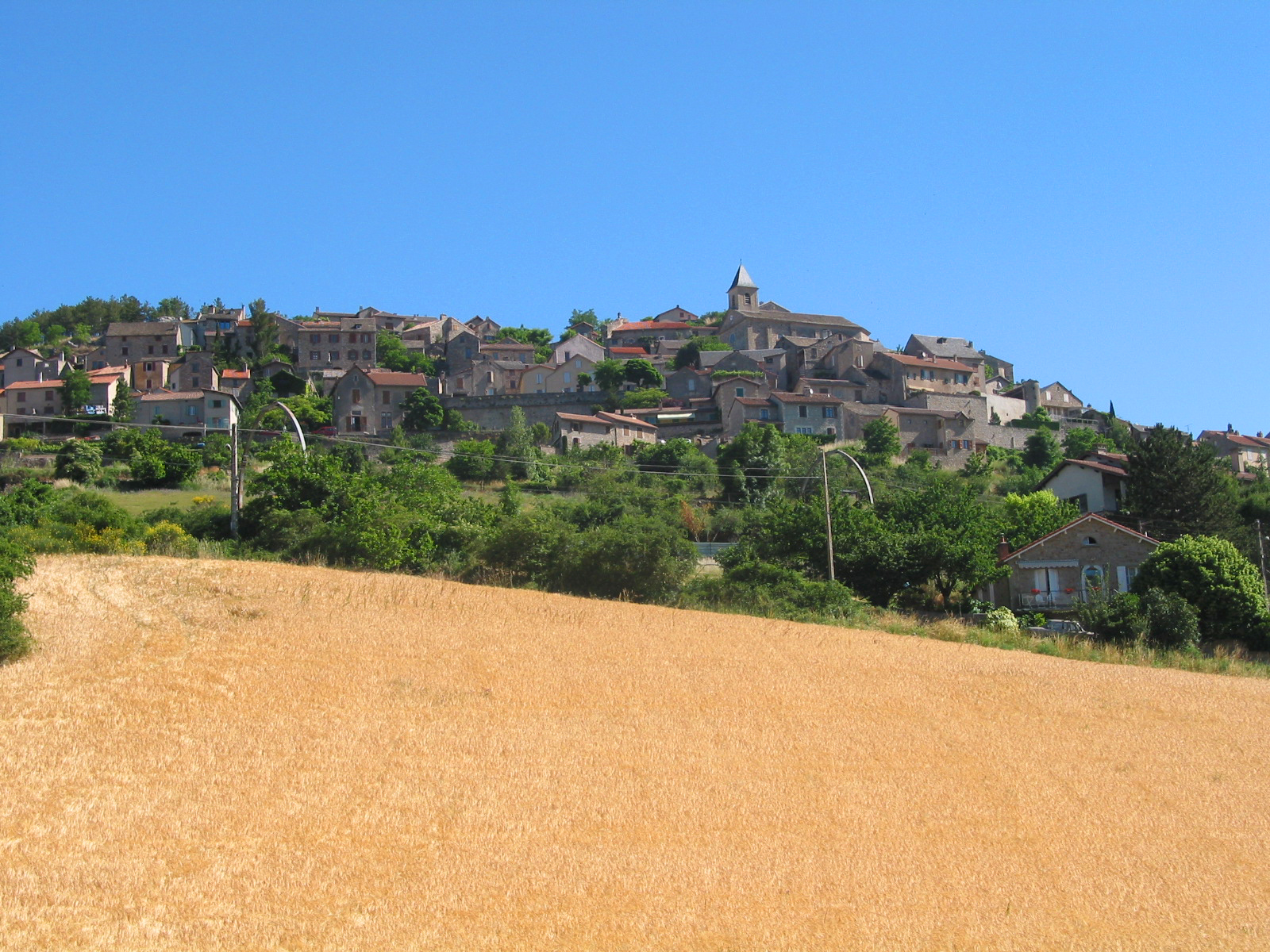
- The village seen from the Tarn valley

- Coat of arms
- Location of Compeyre
- Location within France Location within Occitanie
- Coordinates: 44°09′42″N 3°06′09″E
- Country: France
- Region: Occitania
- Department: Aveyron
- Arrondissement: Millau
- Canton: Millau-2
- Intercommunality: Millau Grands Causses

Government
  - Mayor (2020–2026): Patricia Pitot-Migayrou
- Area^{1}: 10.36 km^{2} (4.00 sq mi)
- Elevation: 460 m (1,510 ft)
- Highest elevation: 860 m (2,820 ft)
- Lowest elevation: 367 m (1,204 ft)
- Population (2023): 526
  - Density: 50.8/km^{2} (131/sq mi)
- Time zone: UTC+01:00 (CET)
  - Summer (DST): UTC+02:00 (CEST)
- INSEE/Postal code: 12070 /12520
- ^{1} French Land Register data, which excludes lakes, ponds, glaciers > 1 km^{2} (0.386 sq mi or 247 acres) and river estuaries.

Compeyre (French pronunciation: [kɔ̃pɛʁ]; Occitan: Compèire) is a commune in the Aveyron department in southern France.

== Population ==
Historical population
Year	Pop.	±% p.a.
1968	334	—
1975	310	−1.06%
1982	348	+1.67%
1990	419	+2.35%
1999	492	+1.80%
2007	532	+0.98%
2012	519	−0.49%
2017	530	+0.42%
2023	526	−0.13%
Source: INSEE

== See also ==
- Communes of the Aveyron department

== Notable people ==
- Mother Marie-Anastasie
