= Arvieu =

Commune in Occitanie, France

- Commune
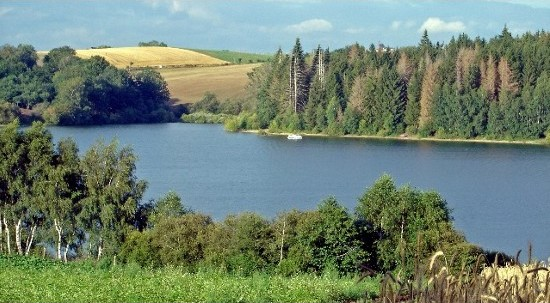
- The Lake of Pareloup
- Location of Arvieu
- Location within France Location within Occitanie
- Coordinates: 44°11′29″N 2°39′43″E
- Country: France
- Region: Occitania
- Department: Aveyron
- Arrondissement: Millau
- Canton: Monts du Réquistanais
- Intercommunality: Lévézou Pareloup

Government
  - Mayor (2020–2026): Guy Lacan
- Area^{1}: 46.91 km^{2} (18.11 sq mi)
- Elevation: 730 m (2,400 ft)
- Highest elevation: 929 m (3,048 ft)
- Lowest elevation: 606 m (1,988 ft)
- Population (2023): 774
  - Density: 16.5/km^{2} (42.7/sq mi)
- Time zone: UTC+01:00 (CET)
  - Summer (DST): UTC+02:00 (CEST)
- INSEE/Postal code: 12011 /12120
- ^{1} French Land Register data, which excludes lakes, ponds, glaciers > 1 km^{2} (0.386 sq mi or 247 acres) and river estuaries.

Arvieu (French pronunciation: [aʁvjø]; Occitan: Arviu) is a commune in the Aveyron department in the Occitanie region of southern France.

== Geography ==
Arvieu is located some 23 km south by south-east of Rodez and 7 km north of Alrance. Access to the commune is by the D56 road from Pont-de-Salars in the north-east passing through the commune and the village and continuing south to Durenque. The D82 branches off the D56 north of the village and goes north to Flavin. The D577 branches off the D56 in the south of the commune and goes west to Salmiech. The commune is entirely farmland except for some small patches of forest.

The eastern border of the commune is the Lac de Pareloup. The Céor river rises in the east of the commune and flows west through the village then south forming part of the western border before continuing west to join the Viaur at Saint-Just-sur-Viaur. The Ruisseau de Glauzeilles rises in the north of the commune flowing west then south-west, forming the north-eastern border of the commune, to join the Céor. The Ruisseau de Calieres rises in the east of the commune and flows north to join the Vioulou just north of the commune.

=== Places and hamlets ===
- Les Auglanes
- Aurifeuille
- Beauregard
- Bel-Air
- Bellevue
- Le Besset
- Bois de Nouet
- Bois Grand
- Bonneviale
- Le Bose
- La Brauge
- La Calmette
- Caplongue
- Cayras
- Cayras Bas
- Les Cazals
- Clauzelles
- Clauzellou
- Les Combes
- Le Coutal
- La Croix de l'Ouradou
- Dournets
- Dours
- Espinous
- Espinouset
- Fau du Dours
- Les Faux
- Font Bonne
- Fouleties
- Galinieres
- Gilergues
- Ginestous
- Girman Bas
- Girman Haut
- La Graille
- Grelac
- Lalic
- La Lumiere
- Mas Roux
- Le Mas Roussel
- Le Mas Vayssettes
- Montginoux
- Montredon
- Le Mouli
- Le Moulin d'Aigles
- Le Moulin de la Gineste
- N.-D d'Aures
- Pareloup
- Le Pouget
- La Pendarie
- Pierrefiche
- Pauhle Rouby
- La Pendarie
- La Plane
- Le Puech
- Puech d'Anglas
- Puech Cabane
- Le Puech de Clauzelles
- Puech d'Espinous
- Puech de Girman
- Le Puech Granier
- Puech de Grima
- Puech Grimal
- Le Rhan
- Les Rials
- Rochers du Diable
- le Roucan
- Rougeviale
- Routaboul
- Le Rueillou
- Saint-Martin des Faux (partly in Arvieu and partly in Salles-Curan)
- Serieux
- Les Sottes
- Tredos
- Ventajou

== History ==
- There are traces of the Gallo-Romans
- In the 16th century the village was besieged
- In the 18th century the Vigouroux family of Rodez bought the Lordship
- The Arvieu Affair: The village was attacked by a band of counter-revolutionaries from the former Army of Charrié who hid in the Palanges Forest. The house of Citizen Bonnefous, the leading citizen of the commune, was pillaged. Many people were accused of supporting the attackers who were from the de Barrau family of Carcenac-Salmiech.
- The ramparts were destroyed in the 19th century.

=== Heraldry ===
Arms of Arvieu	Blazon: Party per bend sinister, at 1 Azure with a Cross of Malta of Or; at 2 Gules, a lion Argent.

== Administration ==
List of Successive Mayors

Mayors from the French Revolution to 1941

From	To	Name	Party	Position
1789	1793	Pierre Lacombe		
1793	1796	Jean Blancpauly		
1796	1797	Joseph Dufieu		
1797	1799	Amans Gaubert		
1799	1801	François Robert		
1801	1816	Léonard Bonnefous		
1816	1821	Pierre Long		
1821	1826	Léonard Bonnefous		
1826	1830	Pierre Long		
1830	1843	Régis Dufieu		
1843	1848	Léonard Bonnefous		
1848	1851	Hippolyte Bonnefous		
1851	1854	Gervais Rigal		
1854	1865	Jean Cayron		
1865	1879	Hippolyte Bonnefous		
1879	1892	Antoine Capron		
1892	1901	Hippolyte Bonnefous		
1901	1904	Pierre Salbat		
1904	1913	Hippolyte Bonnefous		
1913	1929	Victor Espinasse		
1929	1935	Hervé Canac		
1935	1941	Justin Fabie		

Mayors from 1941

From	To	Name
1941	1945	Victor Boudes
1945	1950	Justin Mai
1950	1965	Ernest Thubieres
1965	1983	Raymond Almes
1983	1995	Léonce Terral
1995	2008	Raymond Vaysettes
2008	2014	Claudine Bru
2014	2020	Gilles Bounhol
2020	2026	Guy Lacan

== Population ==
The inhabitants of the commune are known as Arvieunois or Arvieunoises in French.

Historical population
Year	Pop.	±% p.a.
1968	1,234	—
1975	1,093	−1.72%
1982	1,082	−0.14%
1990	925	−1.94%
1999	880	−0.55%
2007	863	−0.24%
2012	820	−1.02%
2017	783	−0.92%
2023	774	−0.19%
Source: INSEE

== Culture and heritage ==
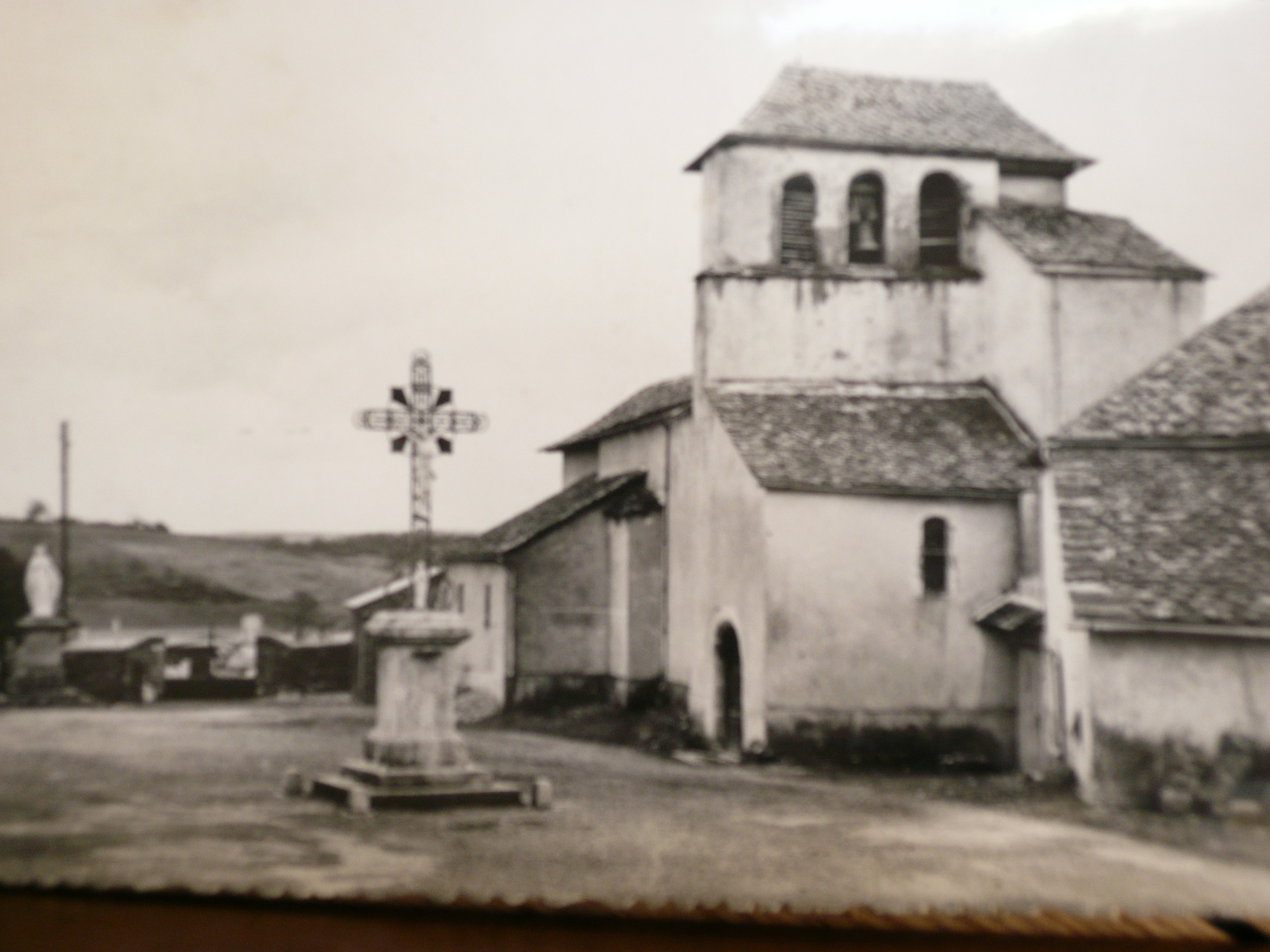
Chapel of Notre-Dame d'Aures

=== Civil heritage ===
- A Feudal Château Sainte-Famille (a former convent).
- The Château of Saint-Louis (now the Town Hall).
- The Château of Montfranc (Arvieu, private property).
- A Pond, Mill, and Lavoir (Public laundry) at Arvieu.

=== Religious heritage ===
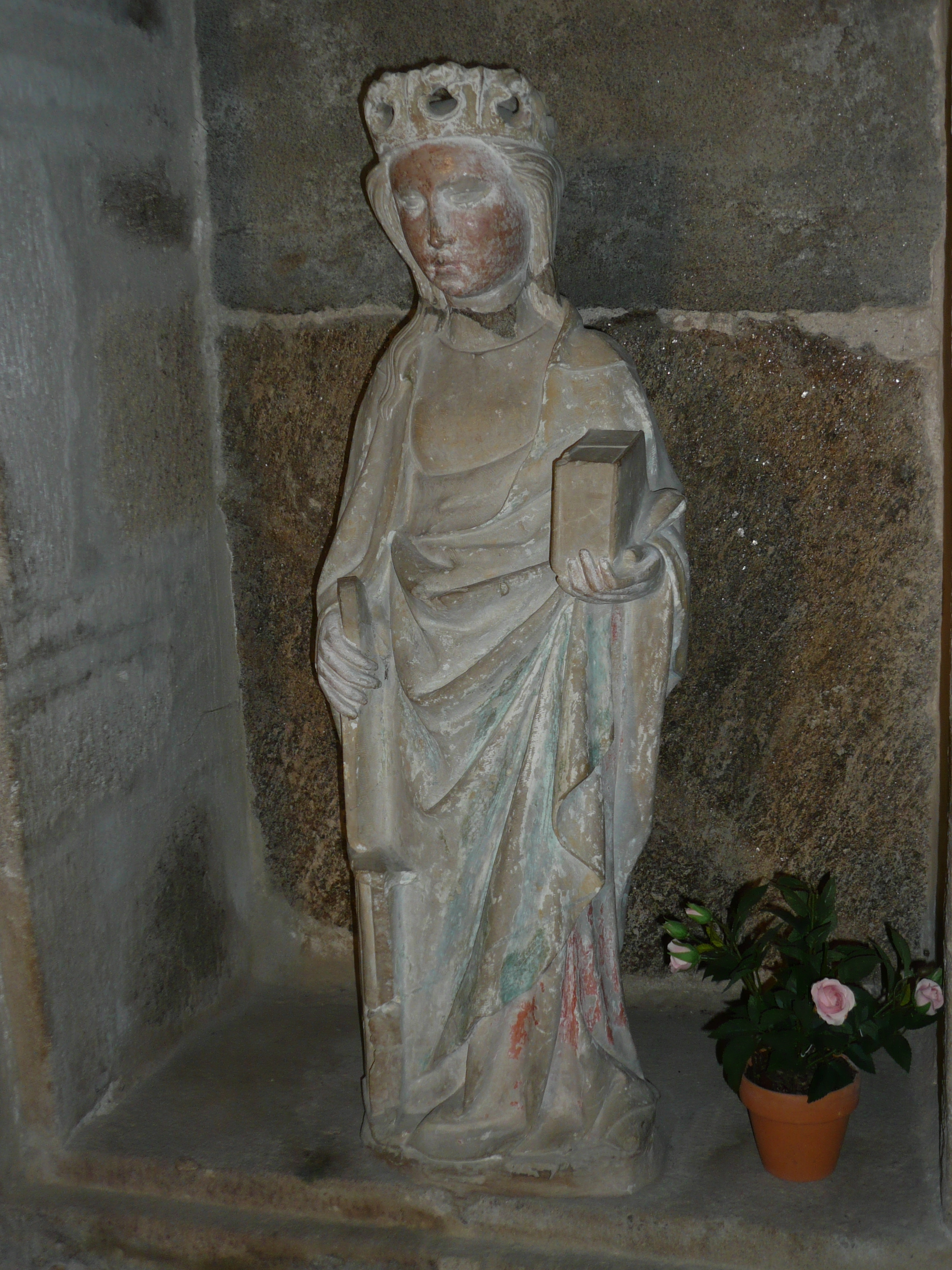
The Statue of Saint Foy

- The Church of Notre-Dame d'Aures (12th centuries) is registered as an historical monument. The church contains a Statue of Saint Foy (15th century) which is registered as an historical object.
- The Parish Church of Saint-Amans at Arvieu had a Painting: The Assumption of the Virgin (disappeared) (1850) which is registered as an historical object.
- The Church of Saint-Saturnin or Saint-Sernin at Caplongue.
- The Church of Saint-Martin at Faux.
- The Chapel of Saint-André at Clauzelles.

== Notable people linked to the commune ==
- Jean Dupin, (1936–), former senior Post Office official, wrote seven novels set in Lévézou, originally from Arvieu village.
- Joël Serin, former secretary in the Town Hall.
- Henri Grimal, born in Arvieu in 1910, academic and historian.

== See also ==
- Communes of the Aveyron department

=== Bibliography ===
- Christian-Pierre Bedel, preface by Bernard Destours, Cassanhas: Arviu, Auriac, Caumont, La Grand'Vila, Saumièg, Senta-Jaleda or Christian-Pierre Bedel e los estatjants del canton de Cassanhas, Rodez, Mission départementale de la culture, 1996, Al canton collection, 240 pages, ill., couv. ill., 28 cm, ISBN 2-907279-30-0, ISSN 1151-8375, BnF 366930046 (in French)/(Occitan)
