= Le Pouget (power station) =

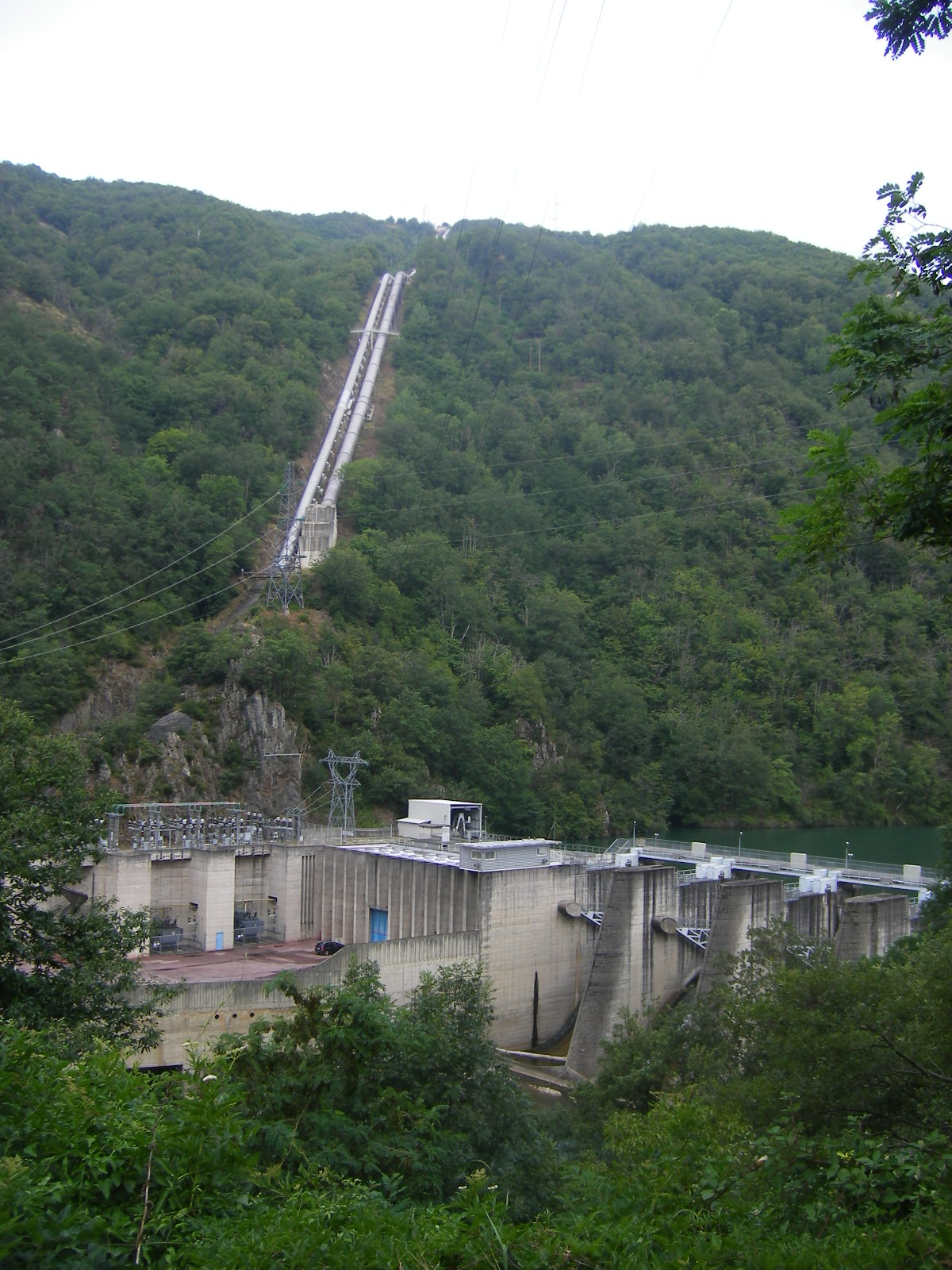
- Le Pouget power station alongside the Tarn, with penstocks connecting it to the Lac de Saint-Amans
- Country: France
- Location: Le Truel
- Coordinates: 44°3′34.92″N 2°46′12.0″E
- Operator(s): EDF

Upper reservoir
- Creates: Lac de Villefranche-de-Panat, Lac de Saint-Amans. Connected to Lac de Pareloup.

Lower reservoir
- Creates: River Tarn

Power Station
- Hydraulic head: 461.2 m
- Installed capacity: 372.5 MW

Le Pouget is a hydroelectric power station located at Le Truel, on the River Tarn, in the department of Aveyron in France. It uses the difference in height between the artificial lakes of Villefranche-de-Panat and Pareloup on the Lévézou plateau and the river 500 m below. It ranks as the 16th largest station in France. It is part of the complex system that connects the rivers Alrance, Ceor, Viaur, Bage and Violou with the Tarn.

In addition to its 440 MW generating capacity it houses a small pumping station that can return 6.6 m³/s of water from the Tarn to its header reservoir.

== Geography ==
The catchment of this system is on the Lévézou plateau- which is at the western end of the Grandes Causses. The plateau lies between 700 m and 900 m and consist of granite rocks. It is a landscape of gentle valleys, drained to the north by the Ceor, Viaur, Bage and Violou which flow towards Rodez, and to the south by the Alrance and the Ruisseau de Asseynes which fall steeply into the Tarn. To the south, exploiting a geological fault is the River Tarn which is at 265 m altitude, and to the south of the river the land rises again to over 600 m. The area is called Les Raspes de Tarn- 30 km to the east is the A75 autoroute and the Viaduc de Millau which crosses the Tarn and Dourdan at the level of the plateau. Further east is the town of Millau and the Karst landscape of the Gorges du Tarn. The impervious granites of the Lévézou make this a suitable location for water capture.

== Description ==
The catchment area of Le Pouget is extensive. The Alrance valley was dammed at Villefranche-de-Panat, creating the 197 hectare Lac de Villefranche-de-Panat. The dam at Villefranche is 17.10 m high and holds back 8.66 hm^{3} of usable water. This passes by a 5.3 km tunnel to the small 11 ha Lac de Saint-Amans reservoir, and then by steel penstocks the last 1.2 km to Le Pouget.

To the north is the Lac de Pareloup. This is the fifth largest hydroelectric reservoir by area in France having an area of 1260 hectares. It was formed by creating a dam across the Vioulou, and pumping water 6.4 km, up 80 m from the 53-hectare Bage reservoir on the Bage river and water from the 200 ha Pont-de-Salars reservoir on the Viaur. Waters from Pareloup can be directed either through the downstream Viaur to the power station at Thuries or through a 10.9 km tunnel to the power station at Alrance at the head of the Lac de Villefranche-de-Panat. A small amount (3.5 hm^{3}) is extracted for use as drinking water in Rodez and Ségala. Pareloup has a catchment area of 376 km^{2}: 160 km^{2} from the Vioulou, Gourde and Céor, 216 km^{2} from the Viaur and Bage. The dam at Pareloup is 43.45 m high and 232 m long- it is 15.87 metres thick at its base, tapering to 2.77 m at the rim. It holds back 167 million m^{3} of usable water.

Water from Le Pouget exits into the Tarn both above and below the Barrage du Truel.

Diagram of the linked rivers, reservoirs, dams, pipelines, pumping stations and power stations.

== Turbines ==
In 1952, the station was equipped with 3 PELTON type turbines. They take 11 m3/s of water and together generate 127.5 MW. They are denominated G1, G2, G3. In 1983 two new generators were installed. These were G4, a 275 MW FRANCIS type turbine, the most powerful of its type used in France; and the unique G5 41.5 MW reversible FRANCIS type turbine. Reversible, the latter could also be used to pump water 461 m up to the lac de Saint-Amans.

G4 uses a turbine that develops 286 MW of power, using 74 m3/s of water. At the time of its installation it was the most powerful gravity fed turbine in Europe and in 2012 is still the most powerful in France. This drives an alternator running at 333 revolutions / minute. It is 91% efficient delivering 275 MW (MVA) of electrical energy to the grid at 15.5 kV – that is nominally 10,245 kA.

== See also ==
- La Jourdanie (power station)
- Pinet (power station)
- Renewable energy in France
