= Alrance (power station) =

Hydroelectric power station

Coordinates: 44°07′21″N 2°41′26″E

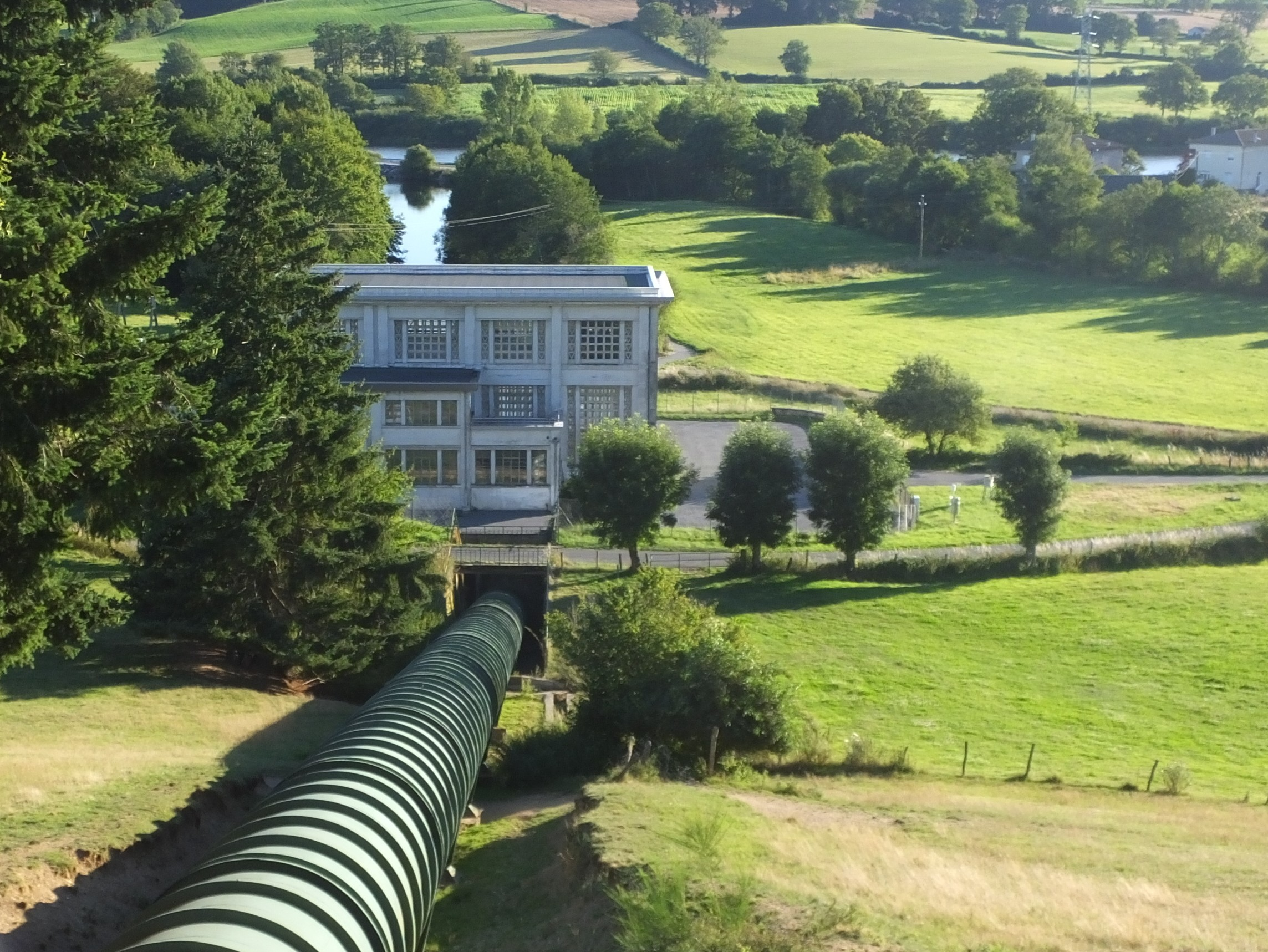
Alrance power station, 2016

Alrance is a hydroelectric power station in the commune of Alrance, Aveyron, southern France. It lies at the head of the Lac de Villefranche-de-Panat which it feeds: it draws water through 10.8 km long penstocks from the Lac de Pareloup.

== See also ==
- Le Pouget (power station)
- Lac de Saint-Amans
- Renewable energy in France
