= Alrance =

Commune in Occitanie, France

- Commune
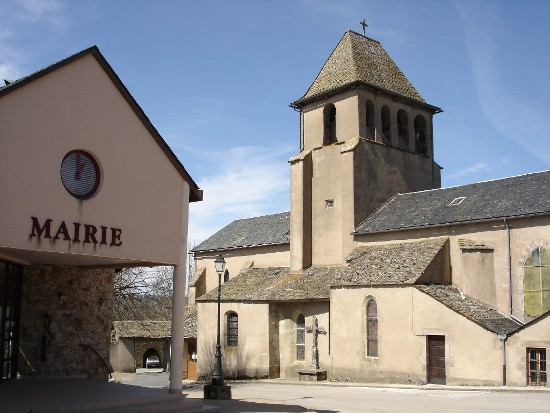
- The town hall and church in Alrance
- Location of Alrance
- Location within France Location within Occitanie
- Coordinates: 44°07′57″N 2°41′03″E
- Country: France
- Region: Occitania
- Department: Aveyron
- Arrondissement: Millau
- Canton: Raspes et Lévezou
- Intercommunality: Lévézou Pareloup

Government
  - Mayor (2020–2026): Bernard Cluzel
- Area^{1}: 35.43 km^{2} (13.68 sq mi)
- Elevation: 735 m (2,411 ft)
- Highest elevation: 971 m (3,186 ft)
- Lowest elevation: 719 m (2,359 ft)
- Population (2023): 335
  - Density: 9.46/km^{2} (24.5/sq mi)
- Time zone: UTC+01:00 (CET)
  - Summer (DST): UTC+02:00 (CEST)
- INSEE/Postal code: 12006 /12430
- ^{1} French Land Register data, which excludes lakes, ponds, glaciers > 1 km^{2} (0.386 sq mi or 247 acres) and river estuaries.

Alrance (French pronunciation: [alʁɑ̃s]; Occitan: Alrança) is a commune in the Aveyron department in the Occitanie region of southern France.

== Geography ==
Alrance is located some 30 km west of Millau and about 50 km north-east of Albi. The commune can be accessed by the D56 road which runs north-east from Durenque and intersects the road D25 in the commune. It continues north through the commune to Arvieu. The D25 comes south-east from Salmiech through most of the length of the commune and continues south-east to Villefranche-de-Panat. Access to the village is from the north-east on road D659 which runs off the D577 south of the Lac de Pareloup. The D659 runs south-west and ends at the village. The D528 also runs off the D25 in the south of the commune to the village.

The commune is mostly farmland with some forest and covered by many country roads. There are a number of other hamlets and villages in the commune. These are:

- L'Adrech
- Bonneguide
- Boussinesq
- Le Bouviale
- La Capelle Farcel
- La Coste
- Las Fenials
- Flauvelou
- Fretanels
- Le Jouanesq
- Lacan
- Le Mas Nespoulous
- Le Mas Viala
- Le Mas Vialet
- Montcouzac
- Nazareth
- La Niade
- Pentezac
- Peyrebrune
- La Rouquette
- Le Sales
- La Vacaresse

A number of streams rise in the commune and flow to the Lac de Villefranche-de-Panat at the southern border of the commune. The streams include L'Alrance, Ruisseau du Lagasi, and several others. Some streams rise in the north of the commune and flow northwards eventually joining the river Céor which eventually flows to the Viaur at Castelpers.

== Administration ==
List of Successive Mayors of Alrance

From	To	Name
1844	1856	Jean Joseph Terral
1856	1860	Adrien Seguret
1861	1862	Jean-Antoine Barthe
1862	1864	Jean-Joseph Terral
1864	1870	Jean-Antoine Barthe
1870	1871	François Gisquet
1871	1878	Joseph Gagraud
1878	1916	Adolphe Gagraud
1916	1919	Léopold Gautier
1919	1934	Adolphe Gagraud
1934	1953	Paul Serin
1953	1959	Gabriel Gintrand
1959	1971	Edouard Galtier
1971	1977	Auguste Fabre
1977	2001	Hubert Bonnefous
2001	2008	Jacques Montrozier
2008	2020	Jean-Pierre Drulhe
2020	2026	Bernard Cluzel

== Population ==
The inhabitants of the commune are known as Alrançais or Alrançaises in French.

Historical population
Year	Pop.	±% p.a.
1968	625	—
1975	550	−1.81%
1982	528	−0.58%
1990	468	−1.50%
1999	417	−1.27%
2007	382	−1.09%
2012	383	+0.05%
2017	358	−1.34%
2023	335	−1.10%
Source: INSEE

== Sites and Monuments ==
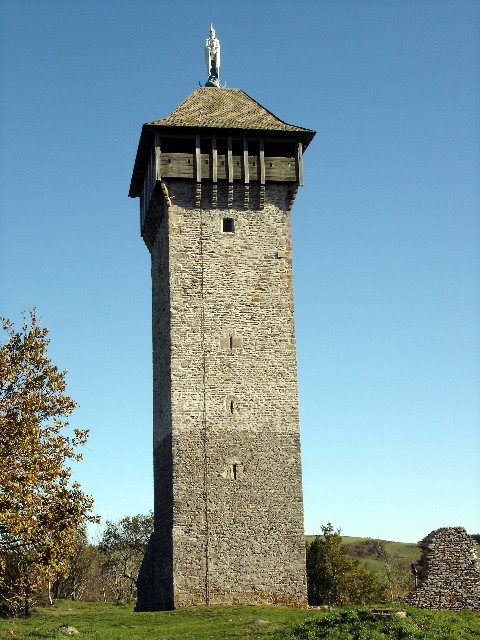
The Tower of Peyrebrune.

- The Lac de Villefranche-de-Panat just south of the commune border provides power and water activities for the commune
- The Church of Alrance and Church of La Capelle-Farcel
- The Tower of Peyrebrune (a chapel and remains of a castle)

== Notable People linked to the commune ==
- Jean-Baptiste Angles, a missionary in Japan.

== See also ==
- Communes of the Aveyron department
