= Centrès =

Commune in Occitanie, France

- Commune
- Coat of arms
- Location of Centrès
- Location within France Location within Occitanie
- Coordinates: 44°09′52″N 2°24′34″E
- Country: France
- Region: Occitania
- Department: Aveyron
- Arrondissement: Villefranche-de-Rouergue
- Canton: Ceor-Ségala

Government
  - Mayor (2020–2026): Nadine Vernhes
- Area^{1}: 36.71 km^{2} (14.17 sq mi)
- Elevation: 541 m (1,775 ft)
- Highest elevation: 605 m (1,985 ft)
- Lowest elevation: 320 m (1,050 ft)
- Population (2023): 462
  - Density: 12.6/km^{2} (32.6/sq mi)
- Time zone: UTC+01:00 (CET)
  - Summer (DST): UTC+02:00 (CEST)
- INSEE/Postal code: 12065 /12120
- ^{1} French Land Register data, which excludes lakes, ponds, glaciers > 1 km^{2} (0.386 sq mi or 247 acres) and river estuaries.

Centrès (French pronunciation: [sɑ̃tʁɛs]; Occitan: Centres) is a commune in the Aveyron department in southern France.

== Geography ==
The river Céor forms most of the commune's southeastern and southern borders, then flows (at Saint-Just-sur-Viaur) into the Viaur, which forms all of its western and northern borders.

== Population ==
Historical population
| Year | Pop. | ±% p.a. |
|---|---|---|
| 1968 | 1,012 | — |
| 1975 | 933 | −1.15% |
| 1982 | 826 | −1.73% |
| 1990 | 699 | −2.07% |
| 1999 | 599 | −1.70% |
| 2007 | 549 | −1.08% |
| 2012 | 550 | +0.04% |
| 2017 | 459 | −3.55% |
| 2023 | 462 | +0.11% |
Source: INSEE

== See also ==
- Communes of the Aveyron department
