= Le Truel =

Commune in Occitanie, France

- Commune
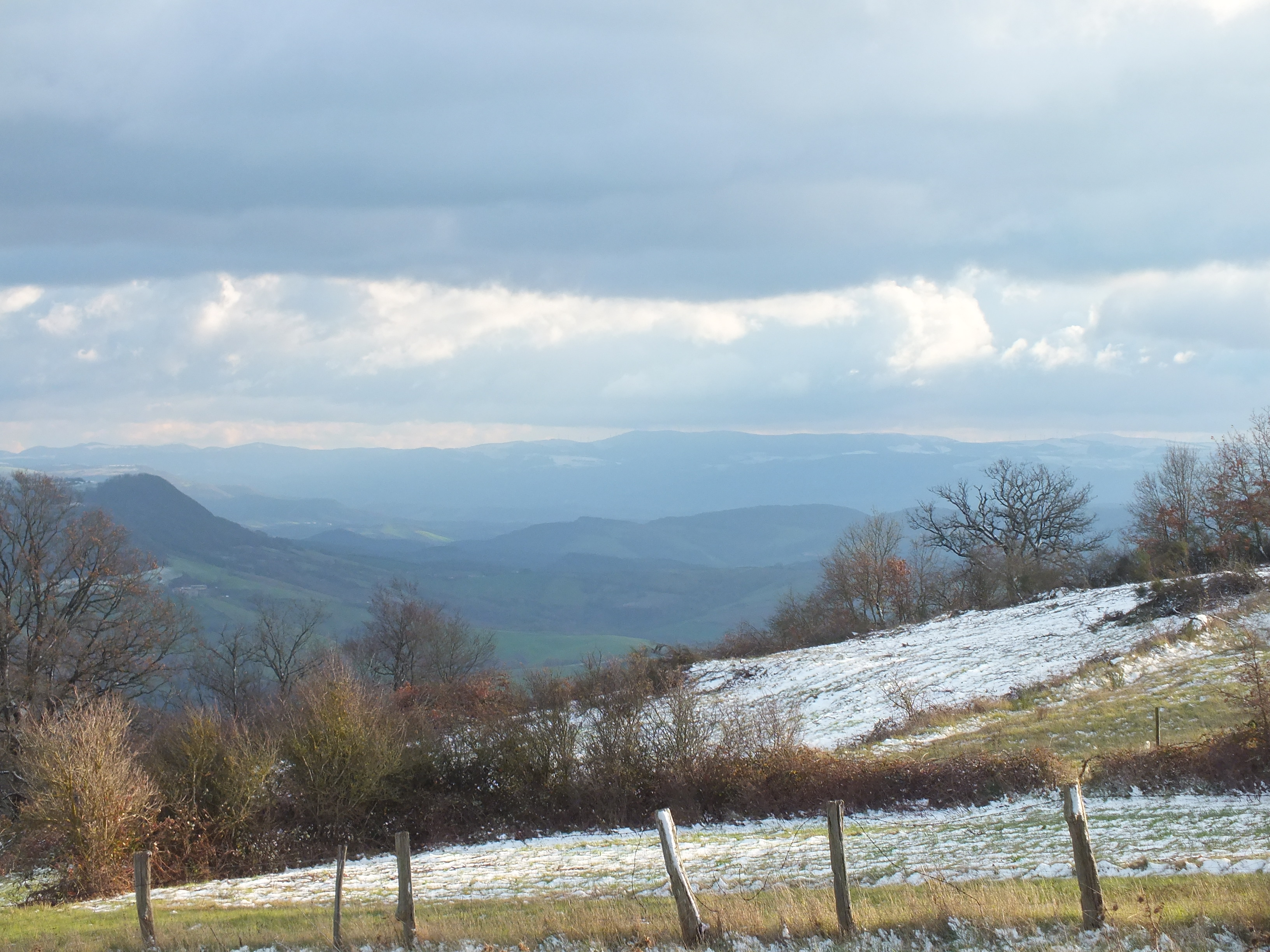
- Vista from Costecalde

- Coat of arms
- Location of Le Truel
- Location within France Location within Occitanie
- Coordinates: 44°03′01″N 2°45′20″E
- Country: France
- Region: Occitania
- Department: Aveyron
- Arrondissement: Millau
- Canton: Raspes et Lévezou

Government
  - Mayor (2020–2026): Jean-Pierre Alibert
- Area^{1}: 26.48 km^{2} (10.22 sq mi)
- Elevation: 260 m (850 ft)
- Highest elevation: 828 m (2,717 ft)
- Lowest elevation: 260 m (850 ft)
- Population (2023): 350
  - Density: 13/km^{2} (34/sq mi)
- Time zone: UTC+01:00 (CET)
  - Summer (DST): UTC+02:00 (CEST)
- INSEE/Postal code: 12284 /12430
- ^{1} French Land Register data, which excludes lakes, ponds, glaciers > 1 km^{2} (0.386 sq mi or 247 acres) and river estuaries.

Le Truel (French pronunciation: [lə tʁyɛl]; Occitan: Lo Truèlh) is a commune in the Aveyron department in southern France. The village was in the ancient province of Rouergue where they spoke in the rouergat patois of Occitan.

== Geography ==
The commune is on the southern edge of the Massif Central. The hamlets to the north have commanding views of the Cevennes and the Millau Viaduct, which is 20 miles (32 km) to the west. The commune is approached along the D200 which connects it to the A75 autoroute. The D200 runs alongside the Tarn which has been dammed and provides the power for two hydro-electric generating plants, Jourdanie and Le Pouget.

== Economy ==
The economy is rural and traditionally was based on the raising of sheep to produce milk for sheep cheeses such as Roquefort. The agriculture has diversified into the raising of veal calves.

=== Barrage du Truel ===
The Tarn has been dammed there and electricity is generated by two Kaplan turbines producing 27 KW.

=== Le Pouget ===
Adjacent to the Barrage du Truel at 275 metres, is the Le Pouget power station. It is powered by waters from the Lévézou plateau delivered by penstocks from the Lac de Villefranche-de-Panat and the Lac de Saint-Amans both at 727 m. Le Pouget delivers 440 MW.

== Population ==
Historical population
Year	Pop.	±% p.a.
1968	473	—
1975	418	−1.75%
1982	445	+0.90%
1990	384	−1.83%
1999	369	−0.44%
2007	339	−1.05%
2012	342	+0.18%
2017	345	+0.17%
2023	350	+0.24%
Source: INSEE

== Gallery ==
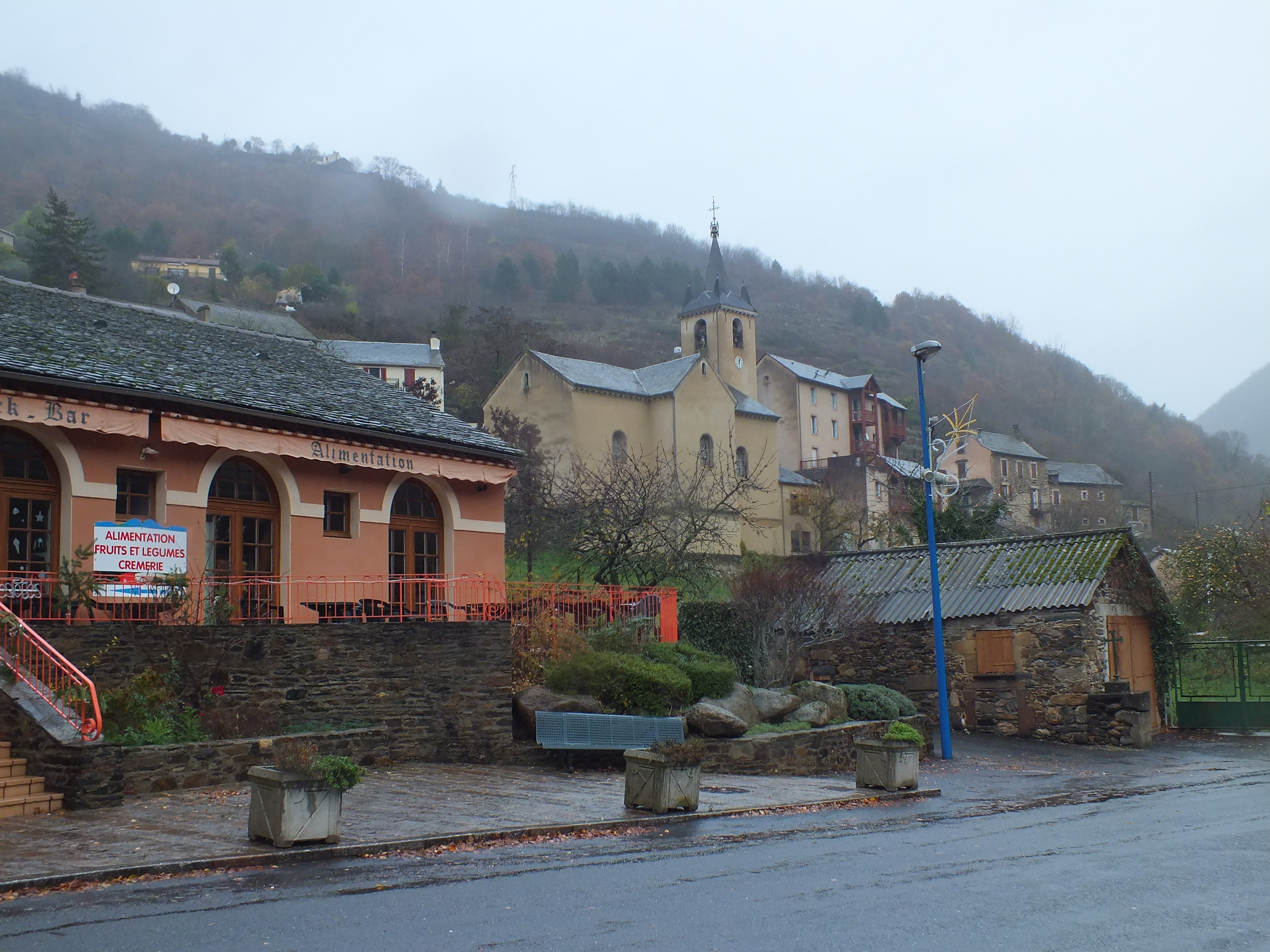

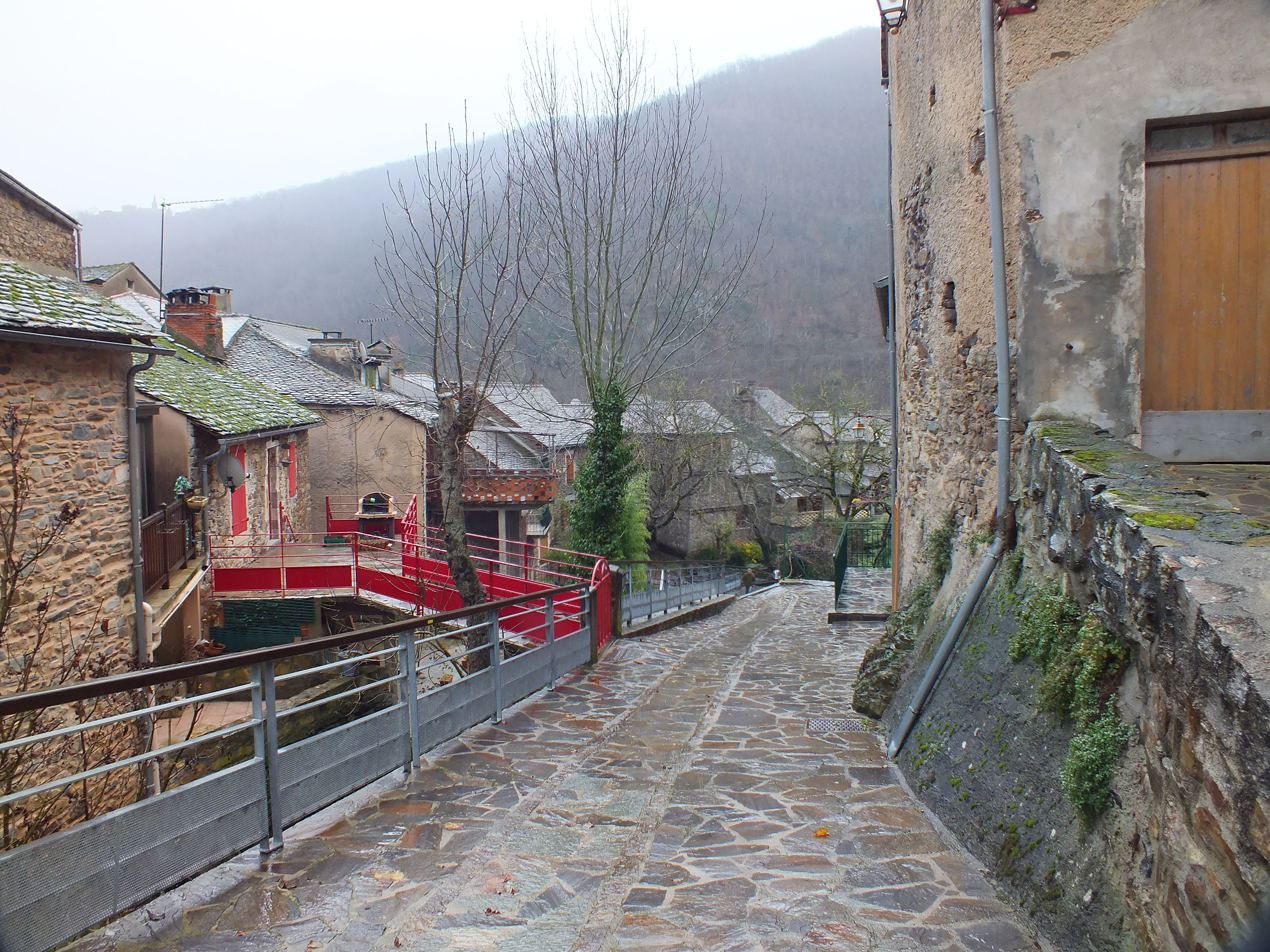

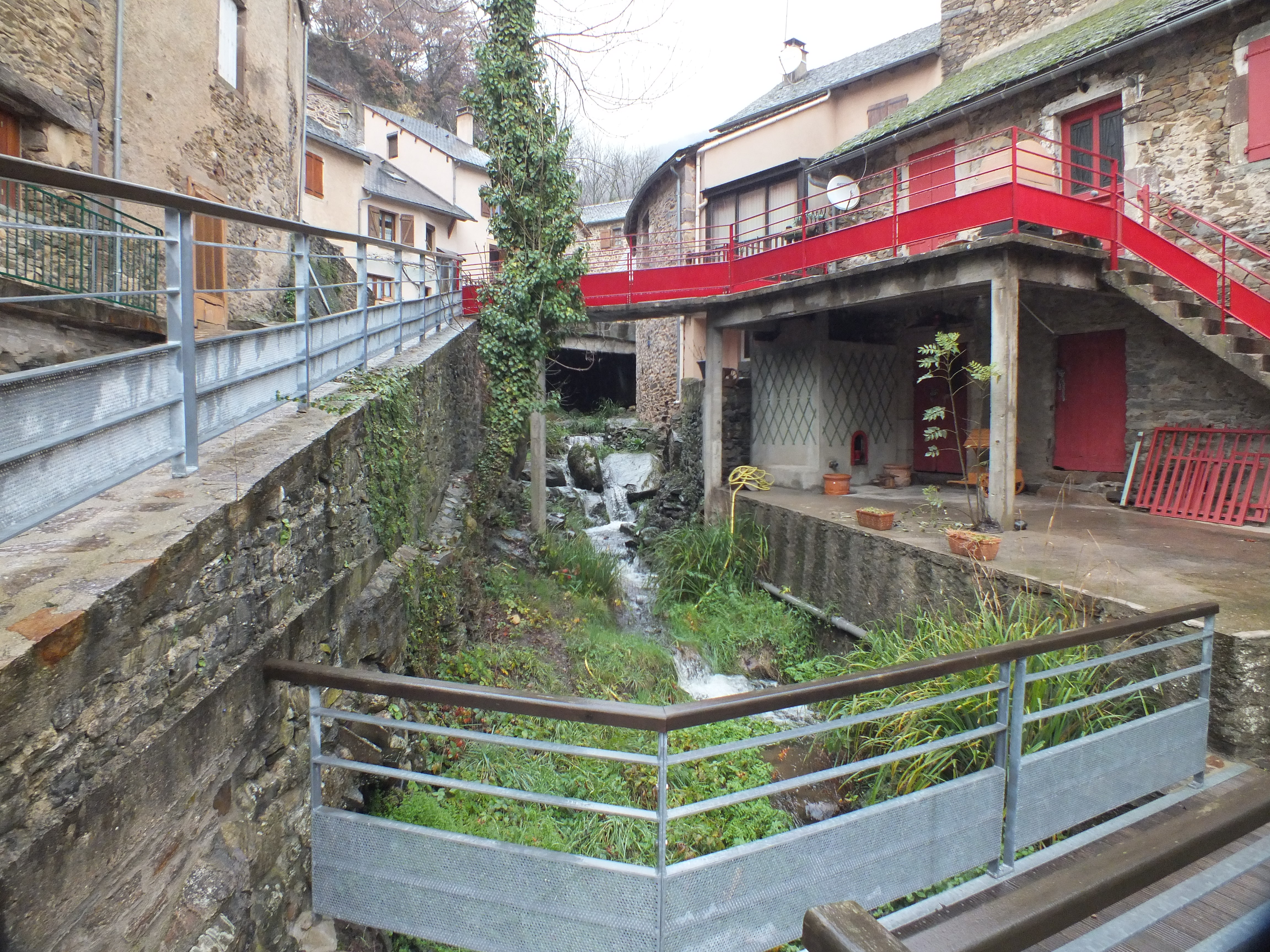

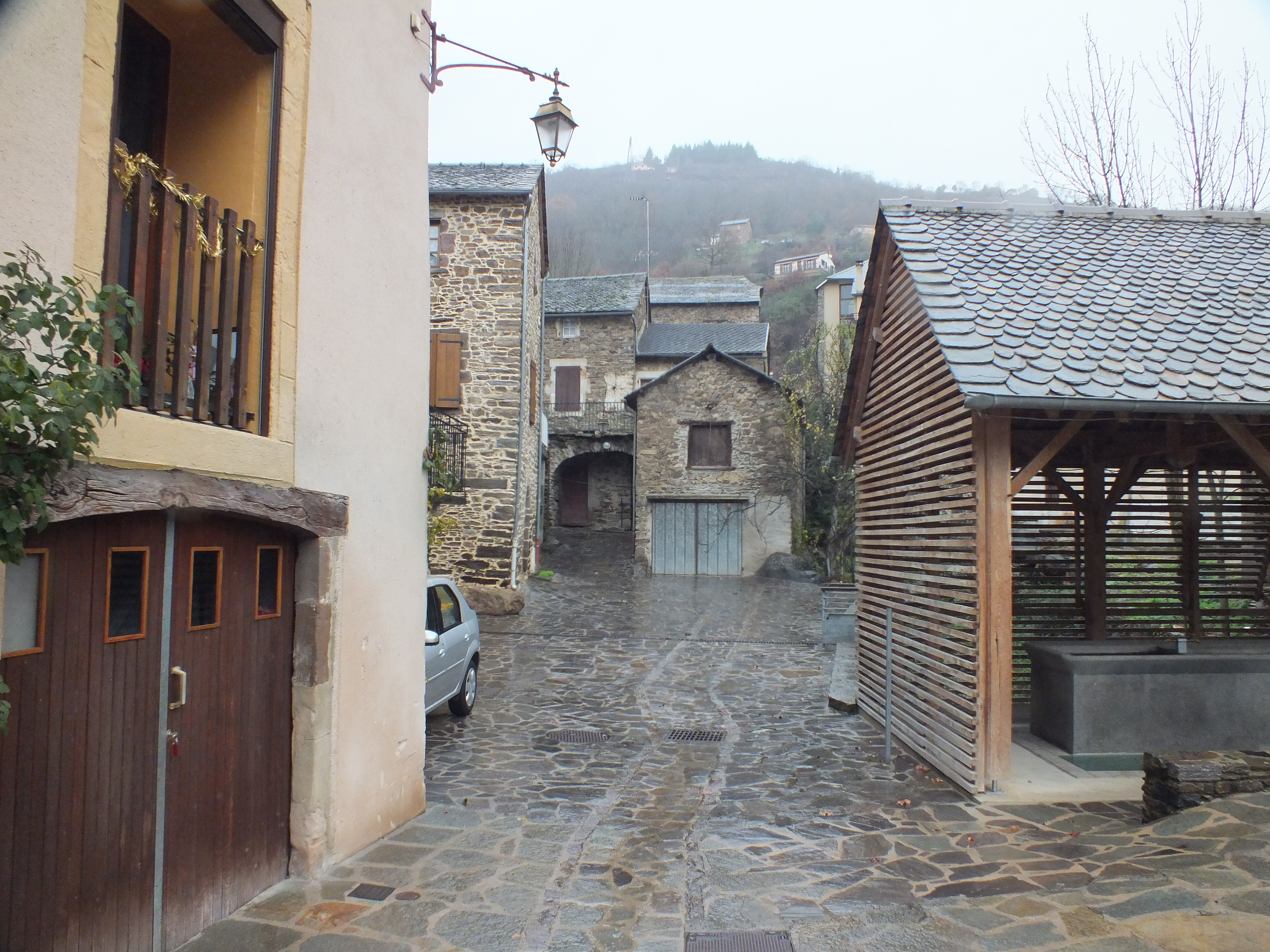
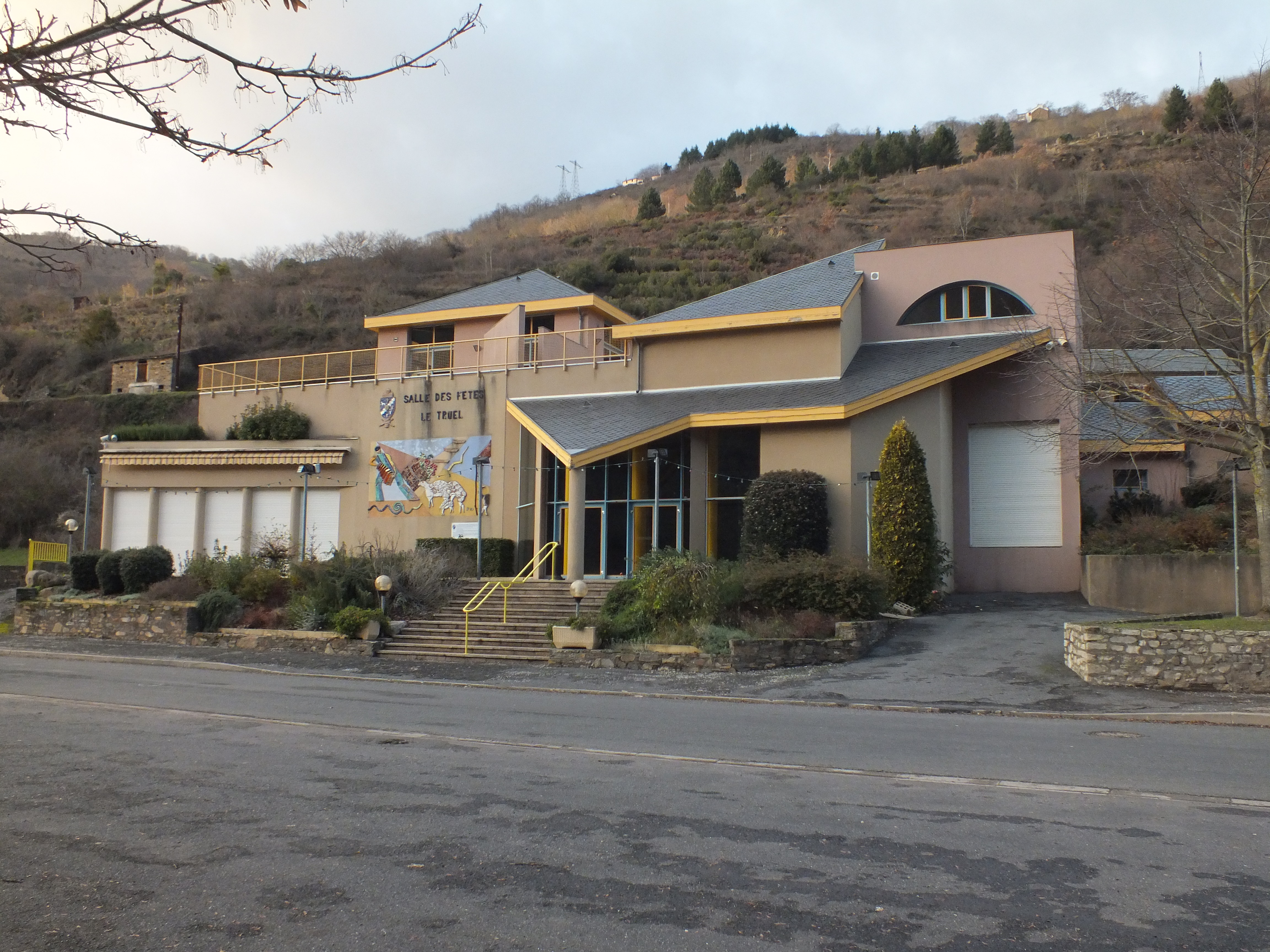

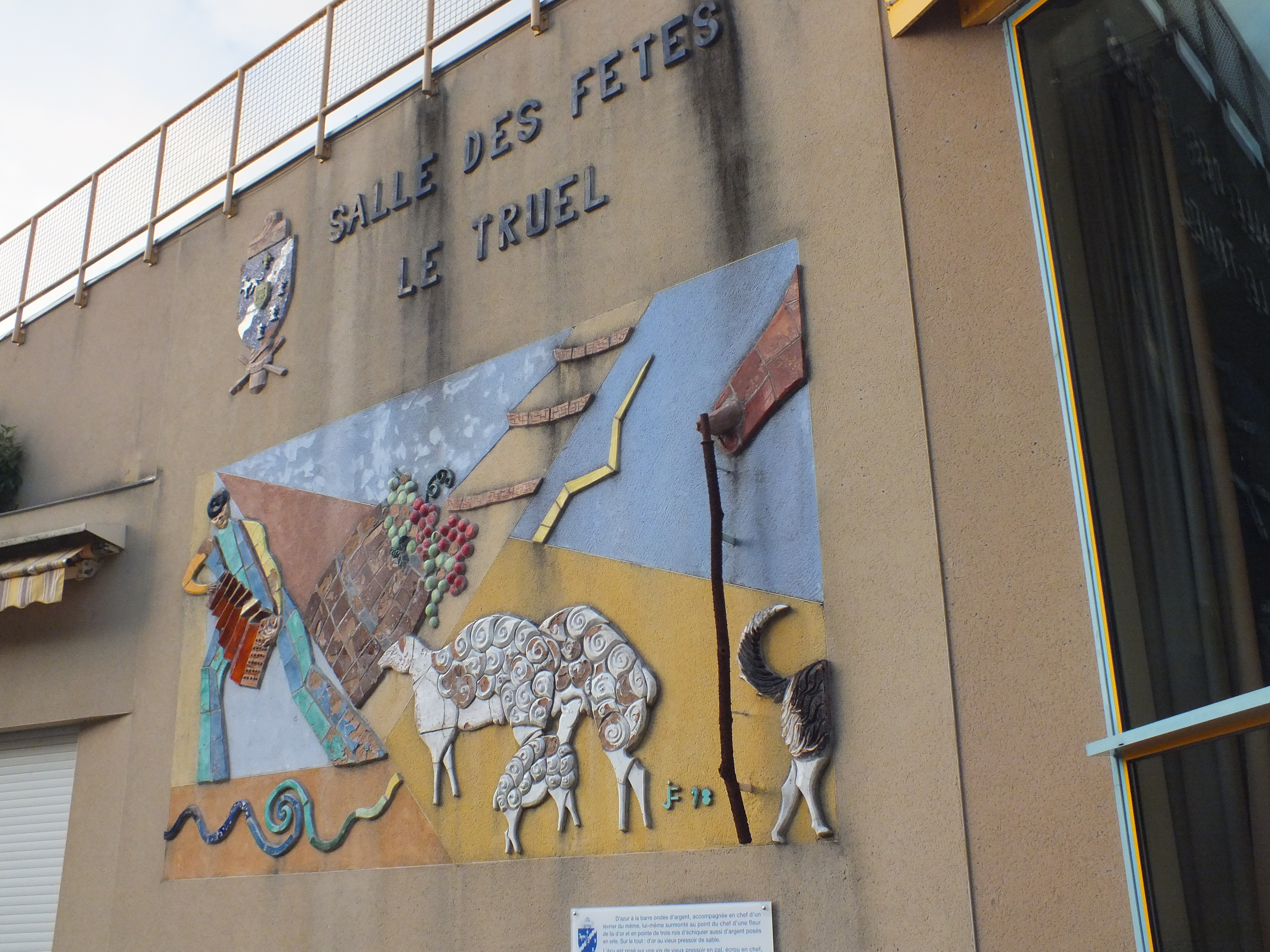

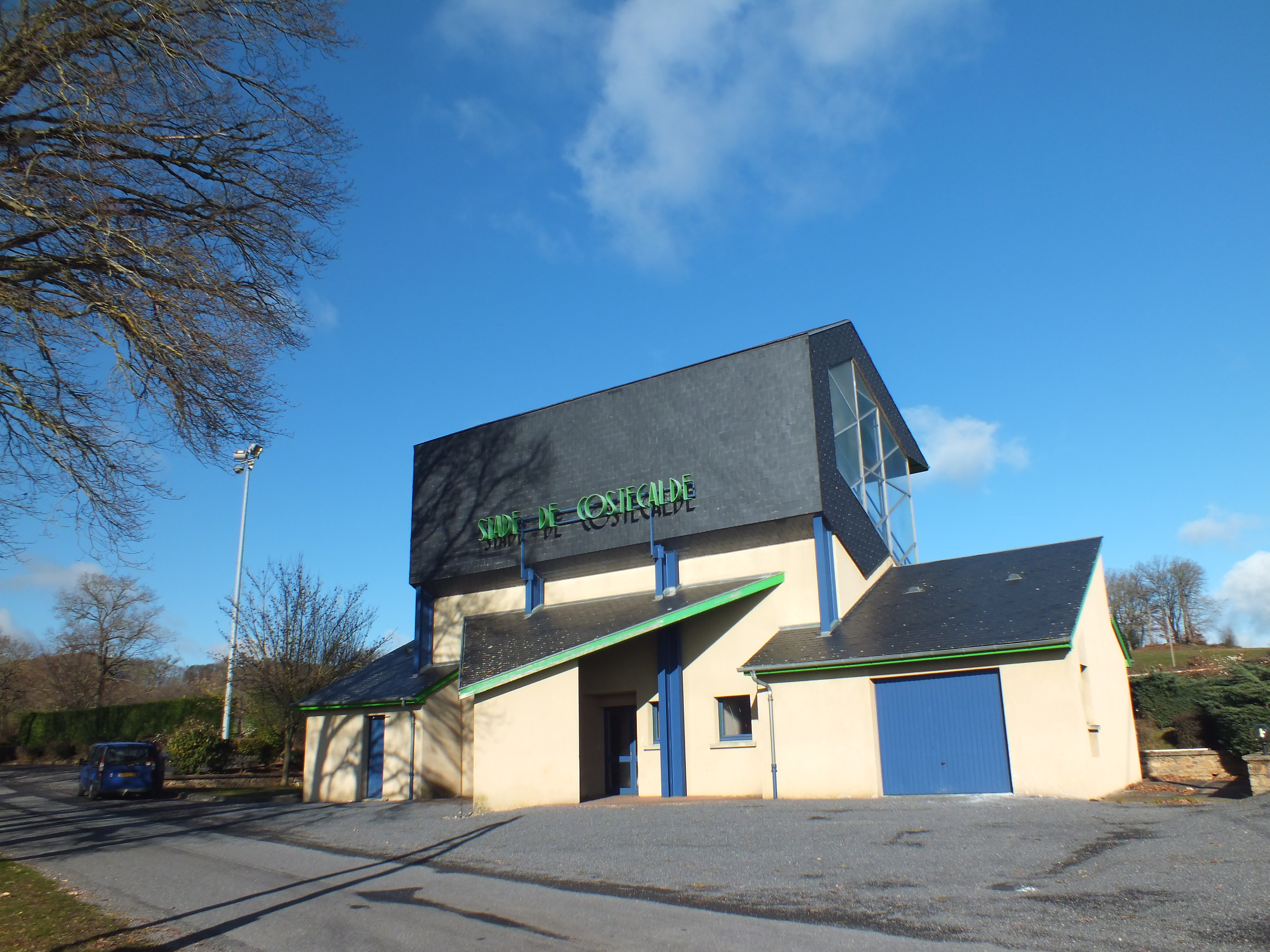

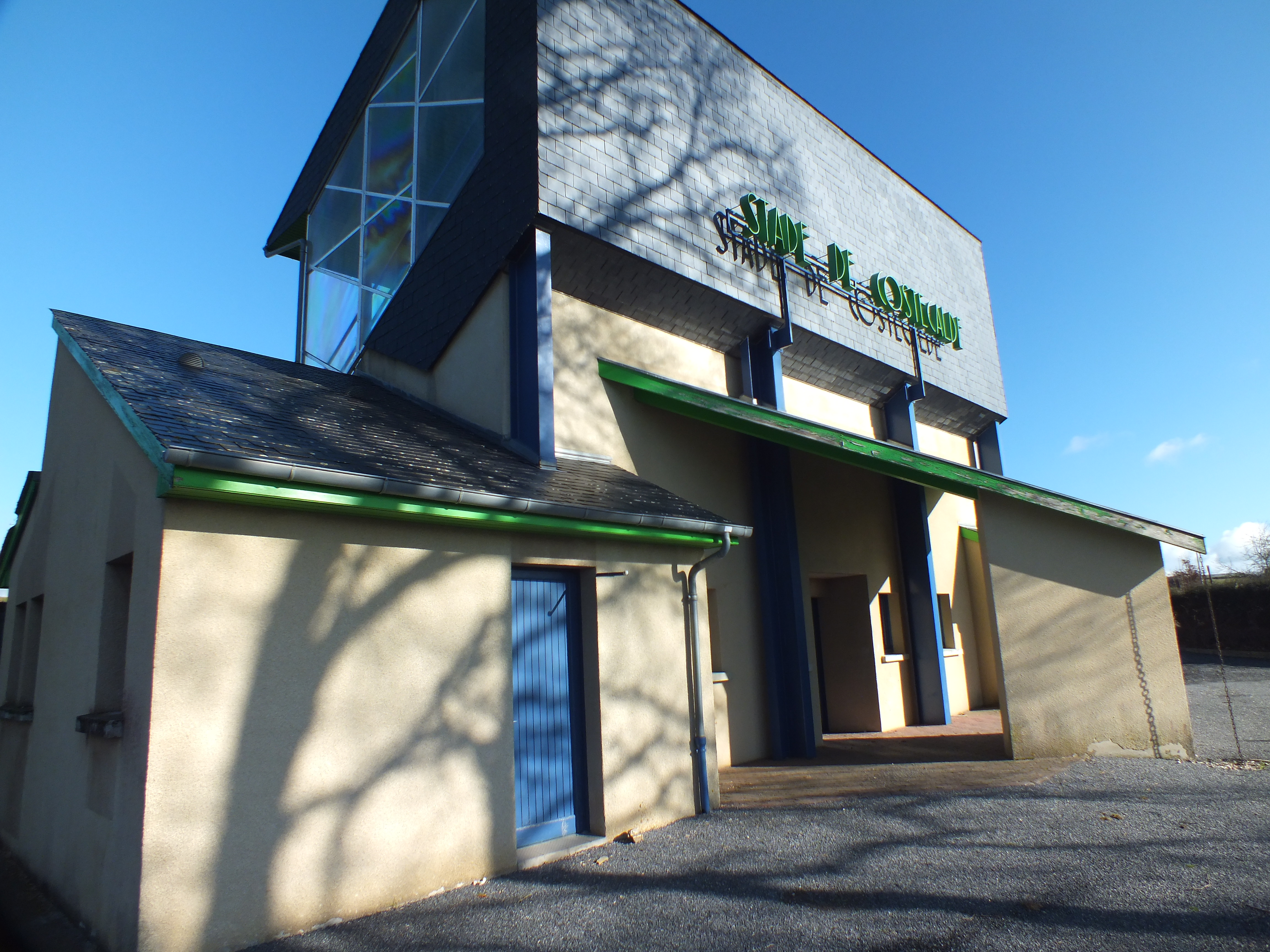
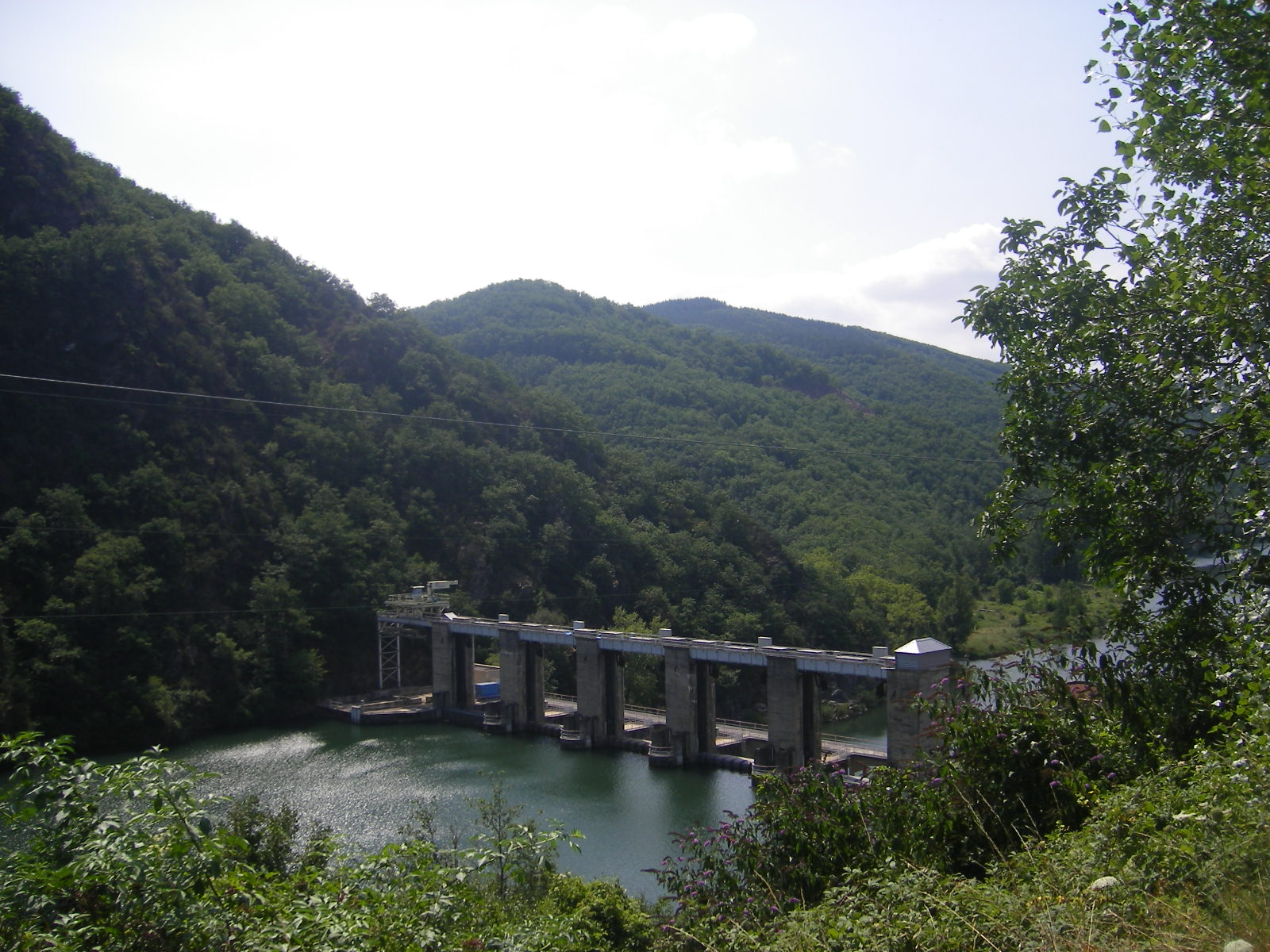

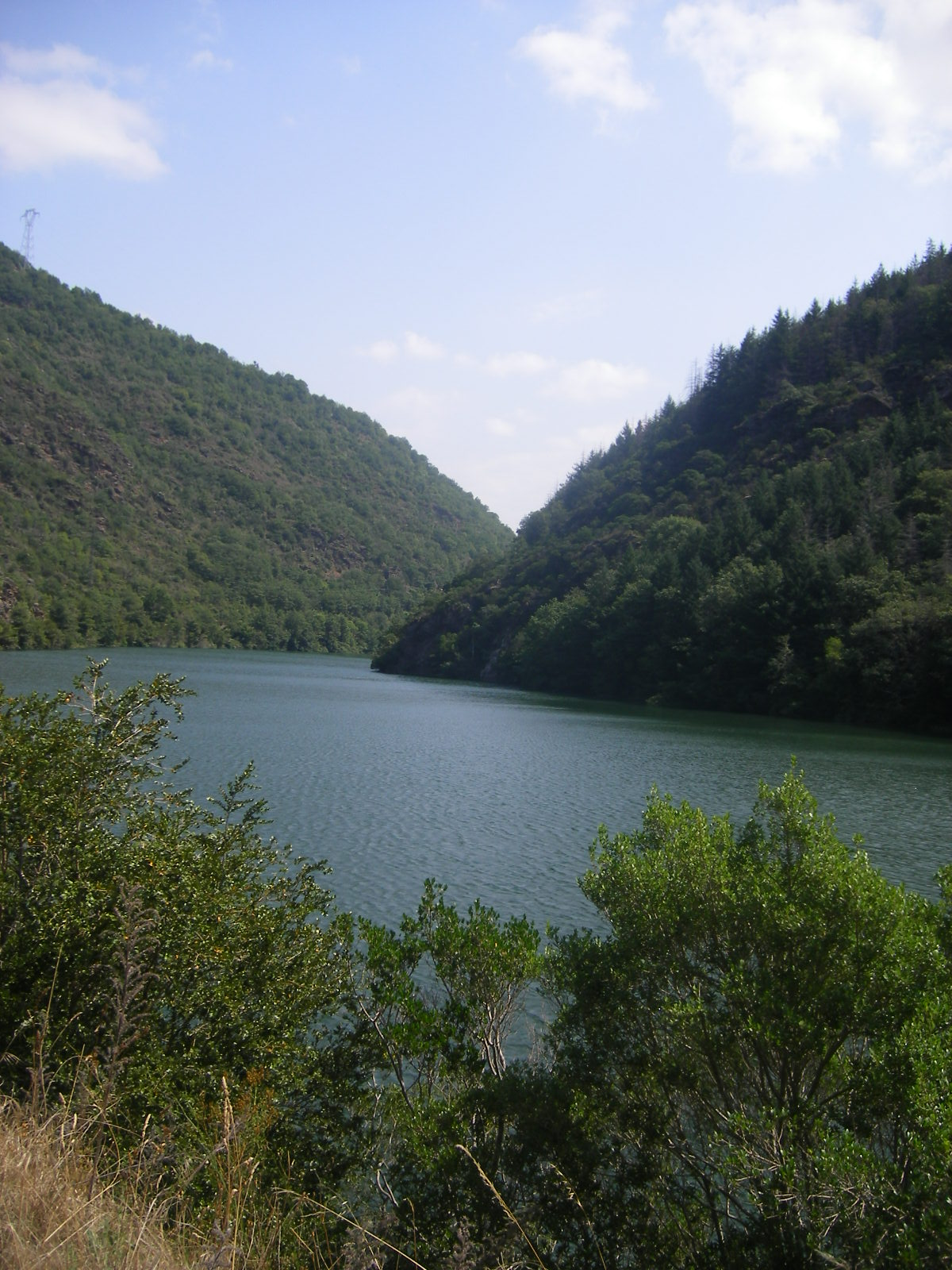

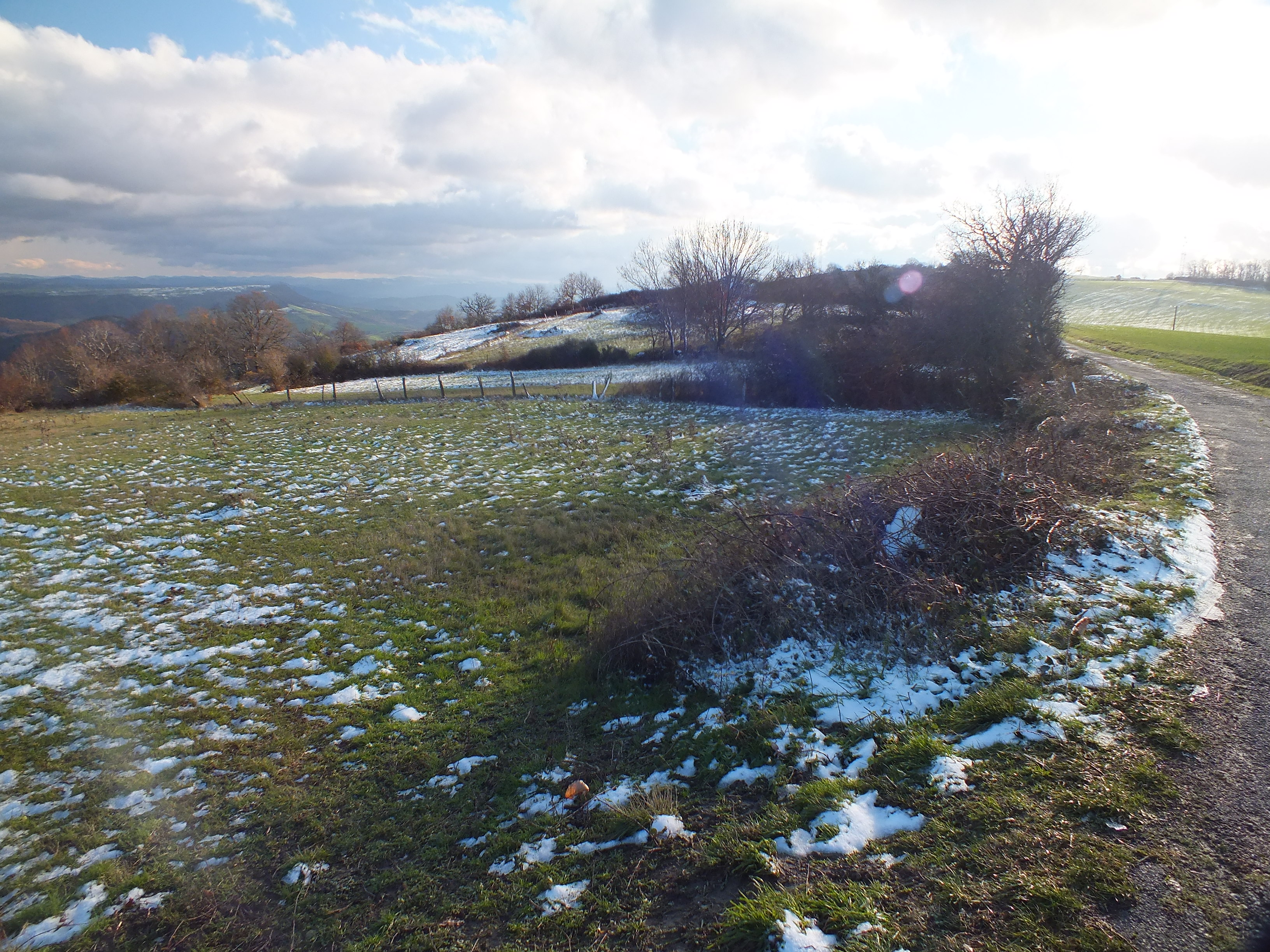

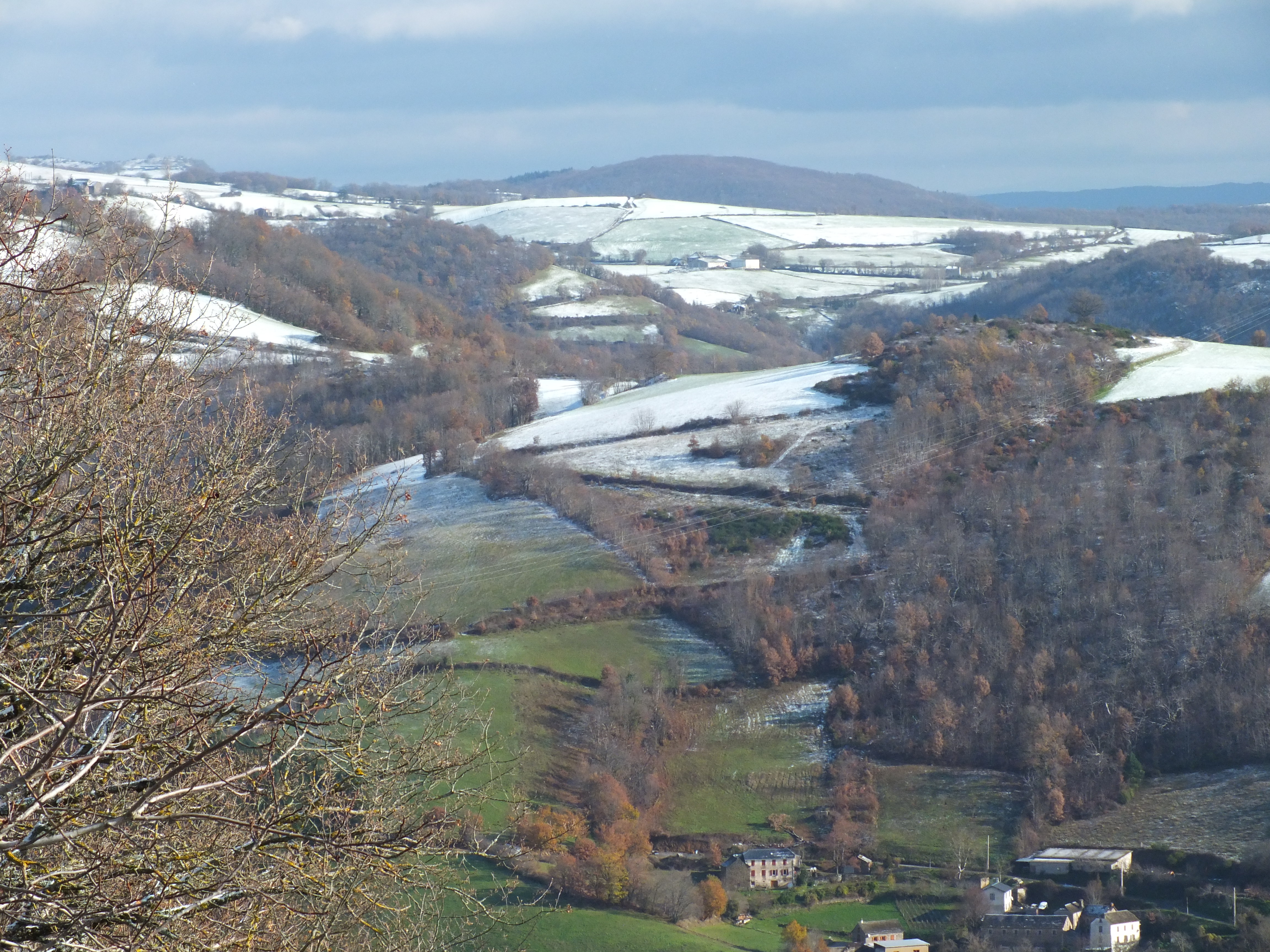
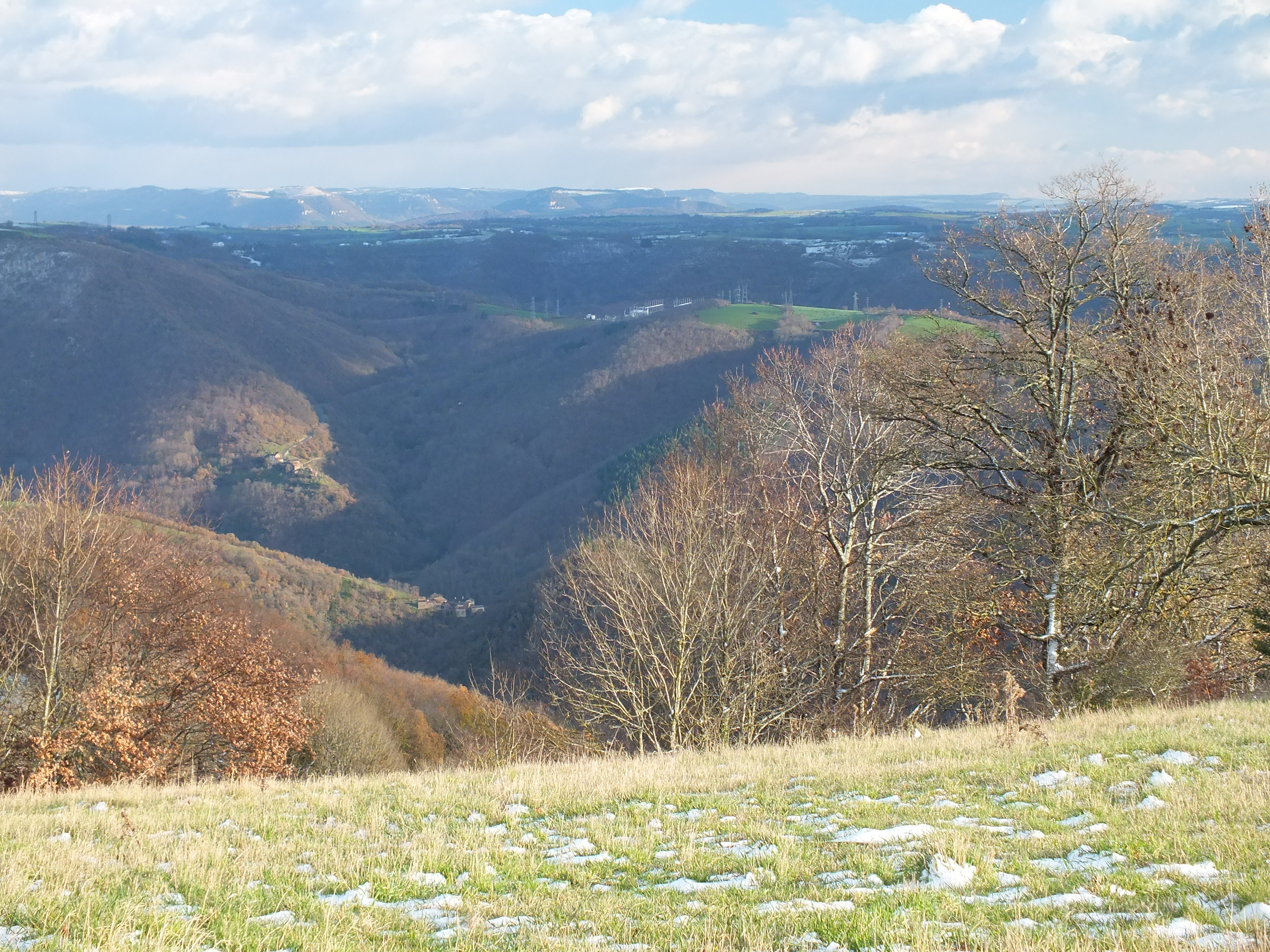

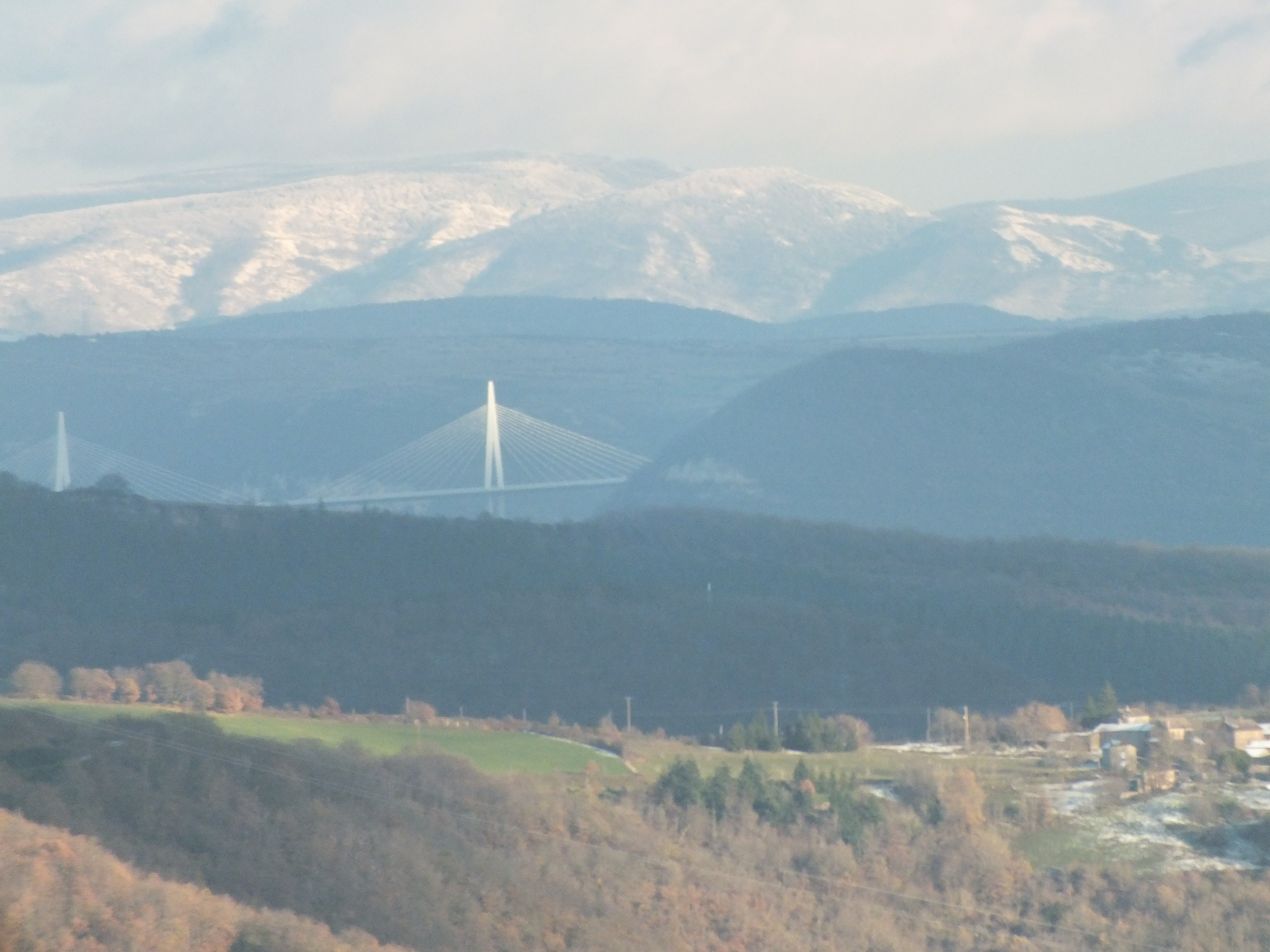

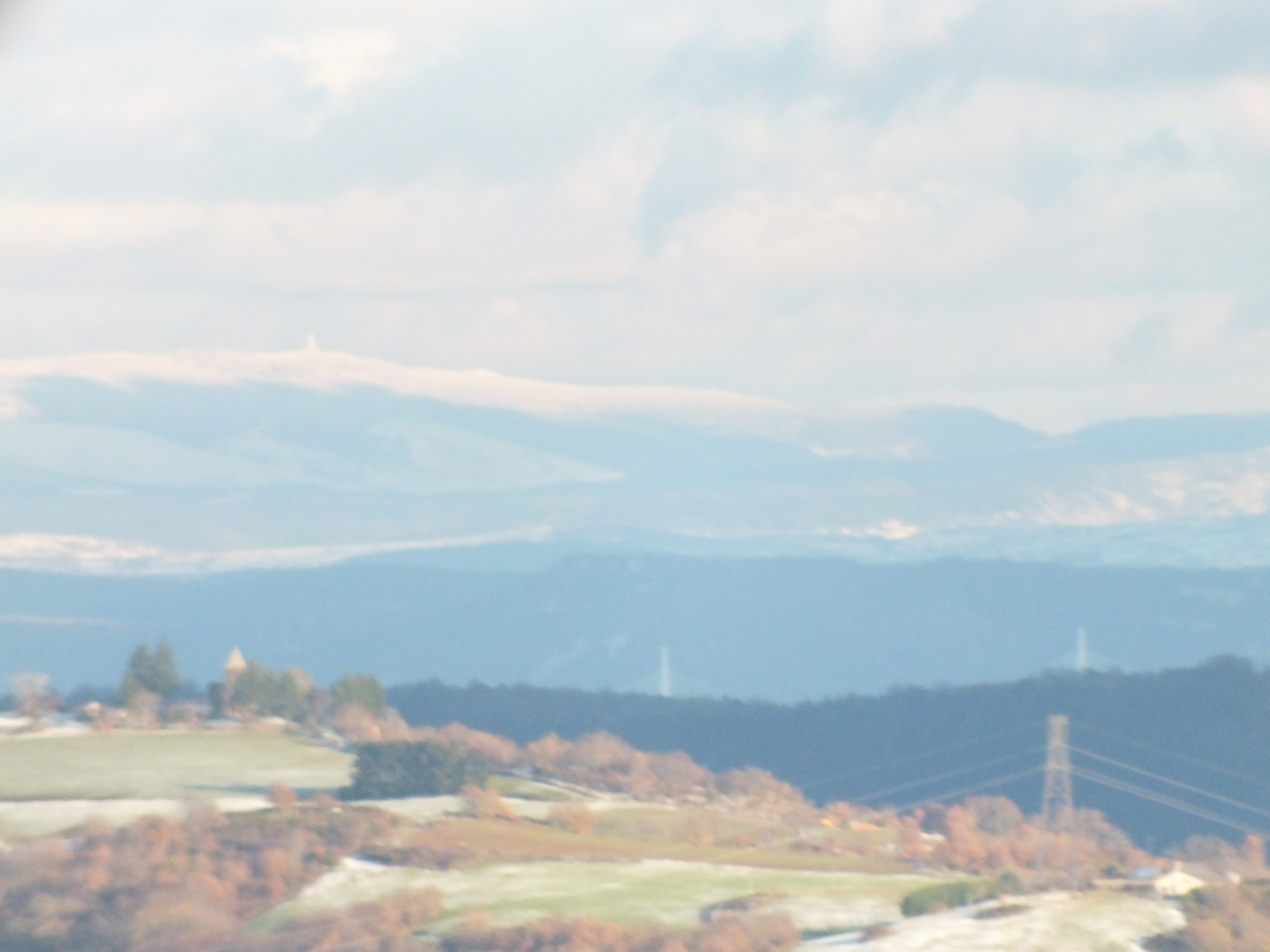

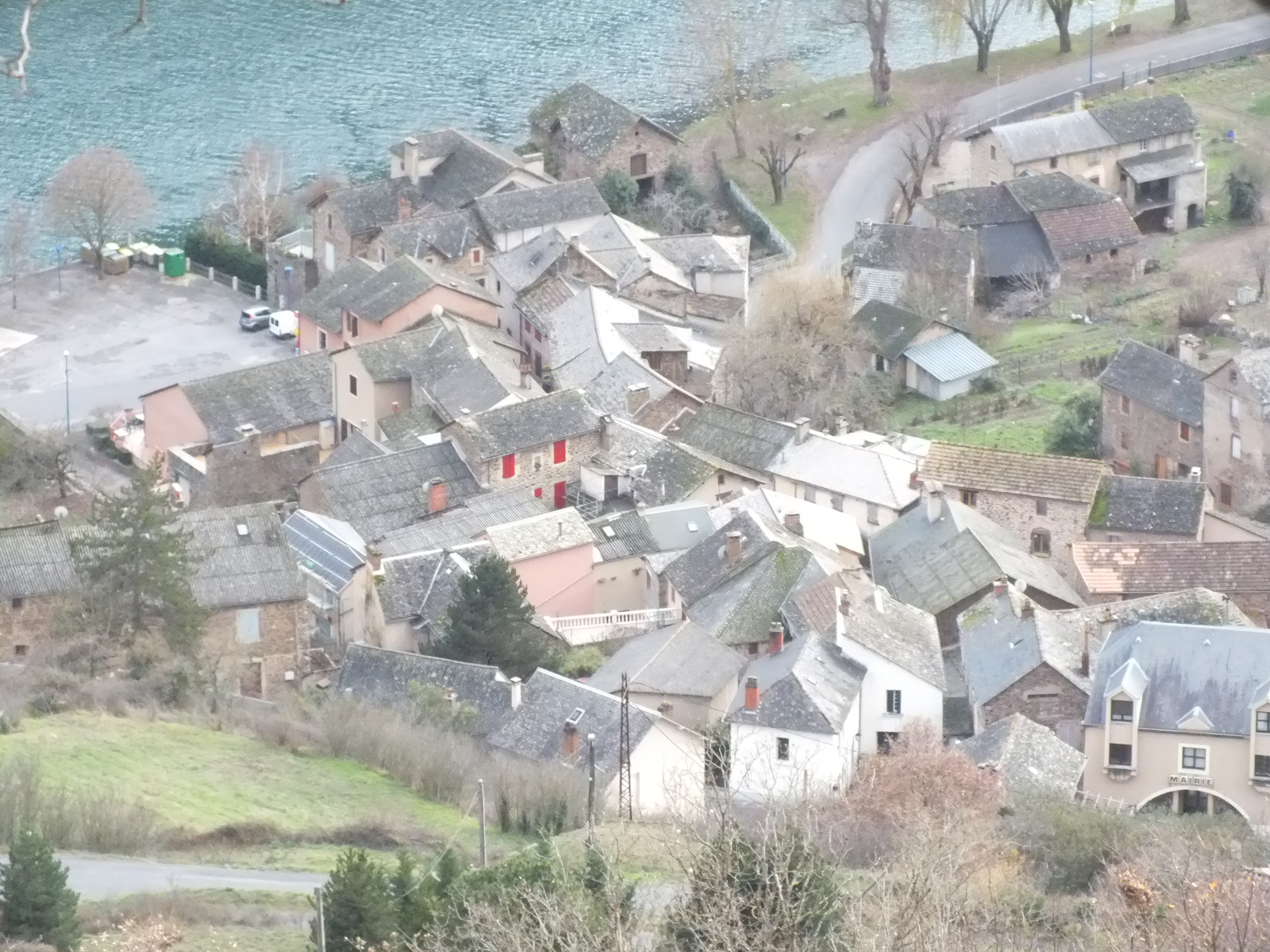

== See also ==
- Communes of the Aveyron department
