= Lac de Villefranche-de-Panat =

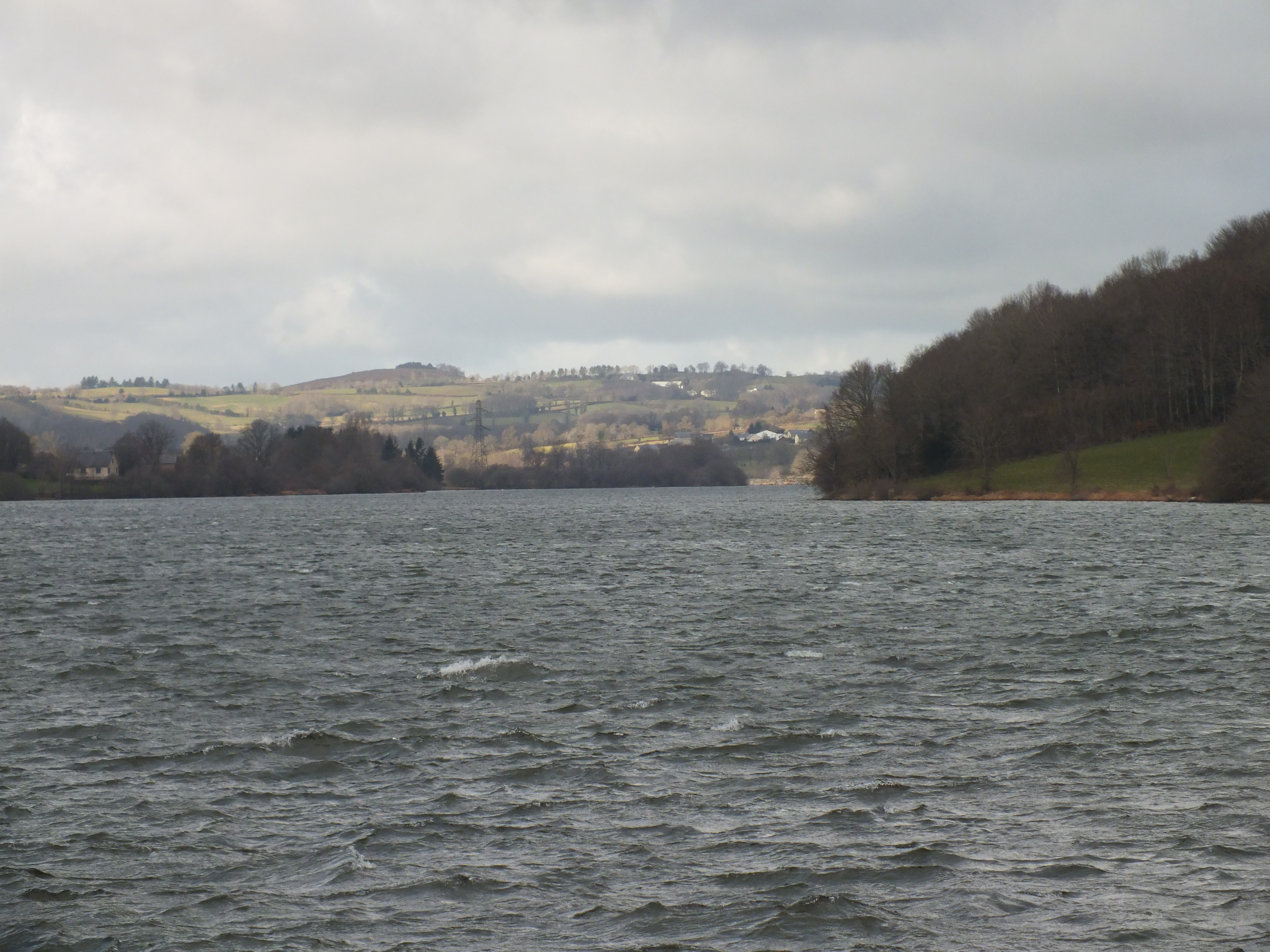
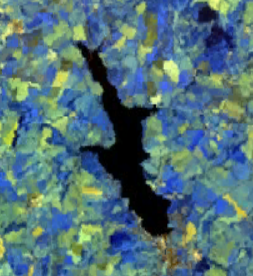
- From the barrage

- Location within France
- Location: Aveyron
- Coordinates: 44°6′25″N 2°41′40″E
- Type: reservoir
- Primary outflows: L'Alrance
- Basin countries: France
- Surface area: 1.92 km^{2} (0.74 sq mi)
- Max. depth: 17 m (56 ft)
- Surface elevation: 727 m (2,385 ft)

Lac de Villefranche-de-Panat (French pronunciation: [lak də vilfʁɑ̃ʃ də pana]) is a lake in Aveyron, France. At an elevation of 727 m, its surface area is 1.92 km^{2}.

It lies in the communes of Villefranche-de-Panat and Alrance.

== Description ==
The Lac de Villefranche-de-Panat is part of an electricity generating system where waters falling on the granite plateau of Lévézou that had drained unhindered into the Viaur and the Tarn river were captured and used by the power stations at Alrance and Le Pouget.

Diagram of the linked rivers, reservoirs, dams, pipelines, pumping stations and power stations.

Waters from the Vioulou fell, and waters from the Vaur were pumped into the reservoir at the Lac de Paraloup whence they passed through a 10.8 km (6.7 mi) steel-lined tunnel to the Alrance power station and into the lake. Waters from three streams that fell directly into the Tarn at Le Truel, are pumped directly into the lake. From this lake tunnels were dug to the Lac de Saint-Amans, where the waters drop 461 m (1,512 ft) vertically to the power station at Le Pouget on the Tarn.

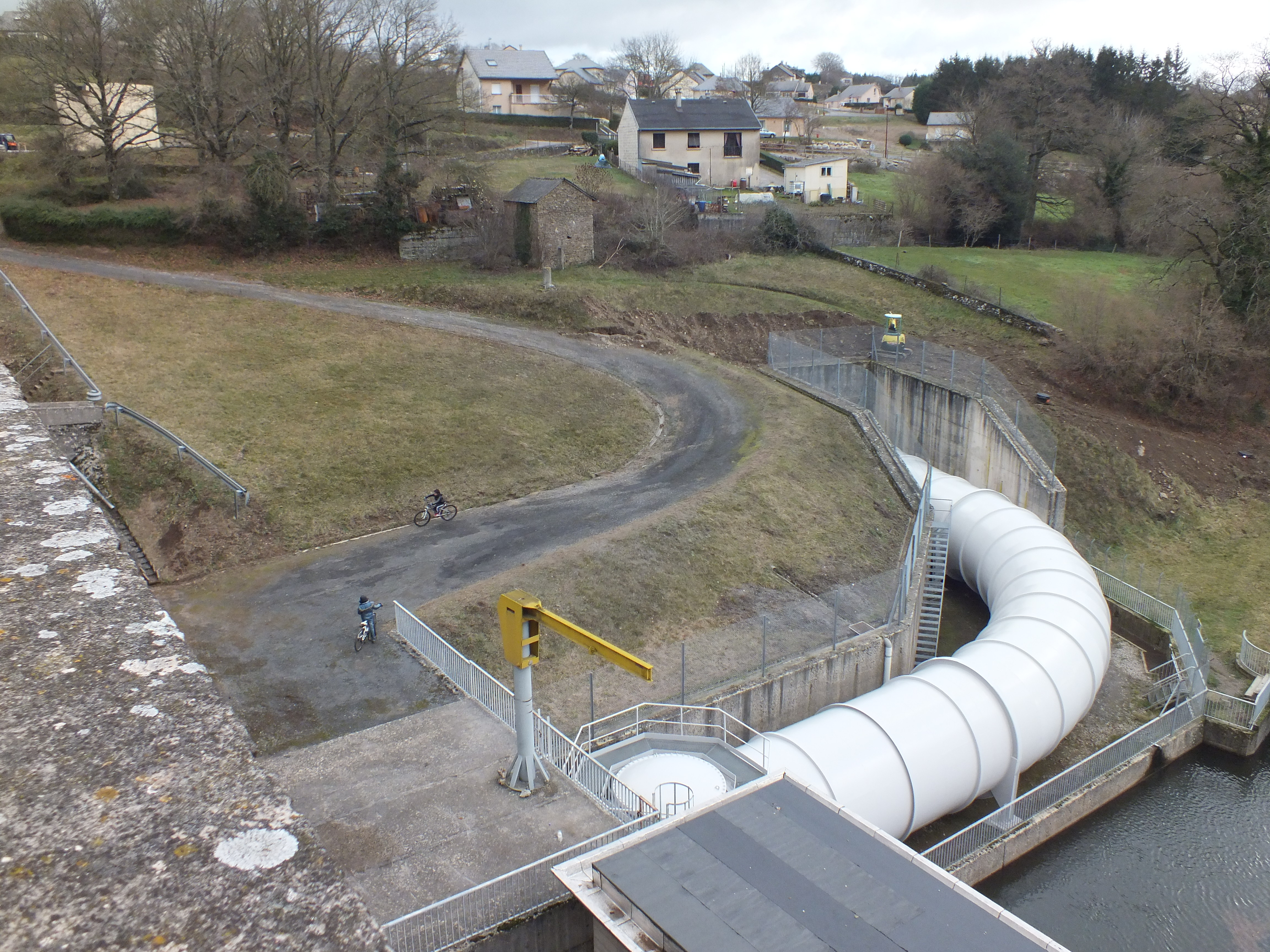
Alongside the dam

== The Dam ==
The Alrance was dammed between 1948 and 1950, which created the lake to supply the Pouget hydroelectric complex. It is a classic gravity dam of earth lined with concrete.

=== Statistics ===
Height : 43 m
Volume of the earth and concrete dam : 31 500 m³
Width at the base : 29 m
Width at the crest : 2,70 m
Length of the crest : 332 m
Volume of water retained : 10,9 hm³
Evacuation in spate : 48 m³/s
Évacuation method : an overflow channel
Discharge : 11 m³/s
Discharge : 1 butterfly valve

The tunnel leading from Villefranche-de-Panat to the Lac de Saint-Amans is 3.4 m in diameter and 4,690 m long.

== Leisure ==
The lake is used for boating, swimming, fishing and Hydro ULM. The lake is used for the swimming portion of the Lévézou triathlon, but it was competed as a duathlon in 2023 and 2026 due to cyanobacteria in the lake. La Fête du lac also takes place at the lake.

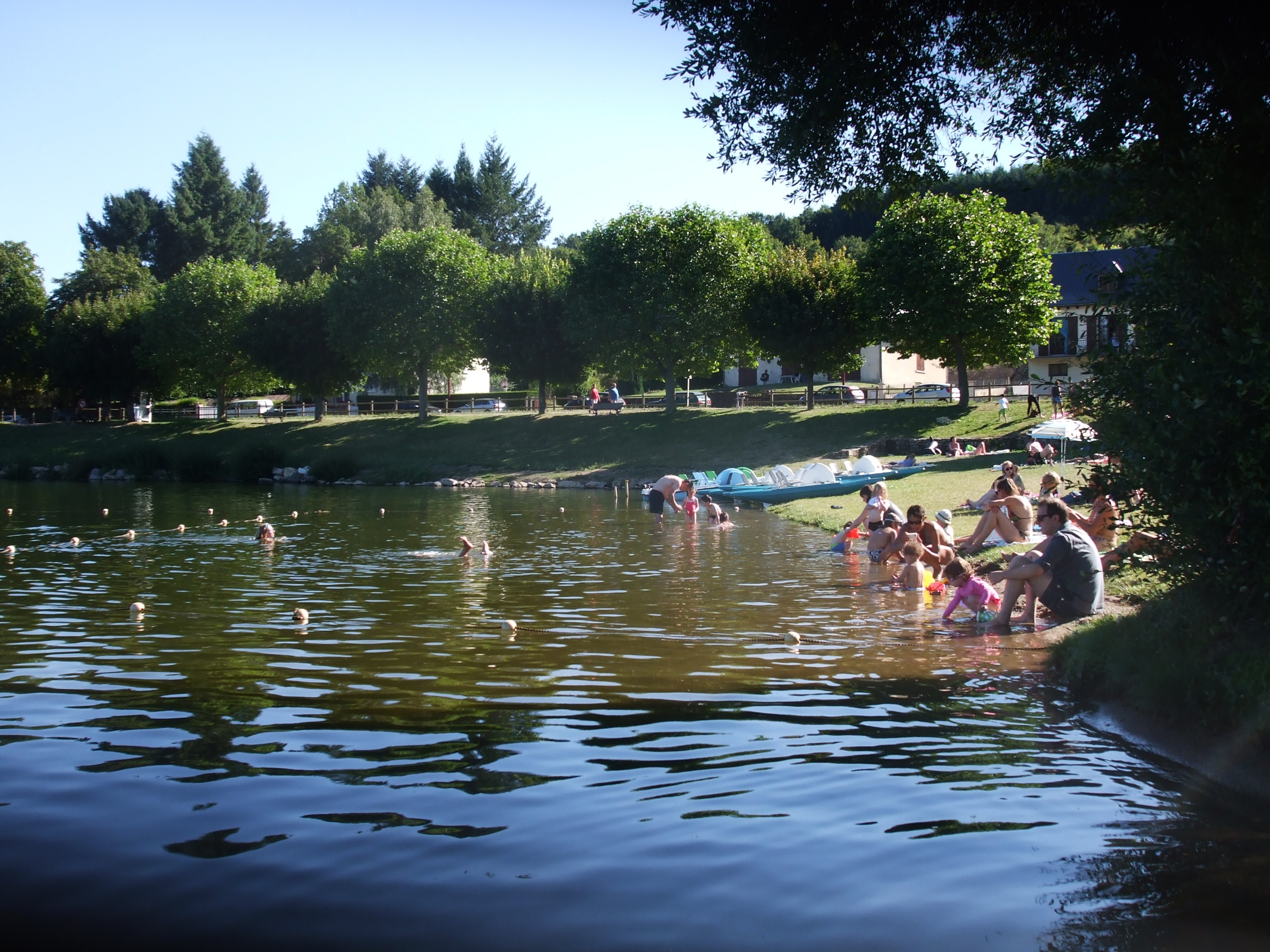

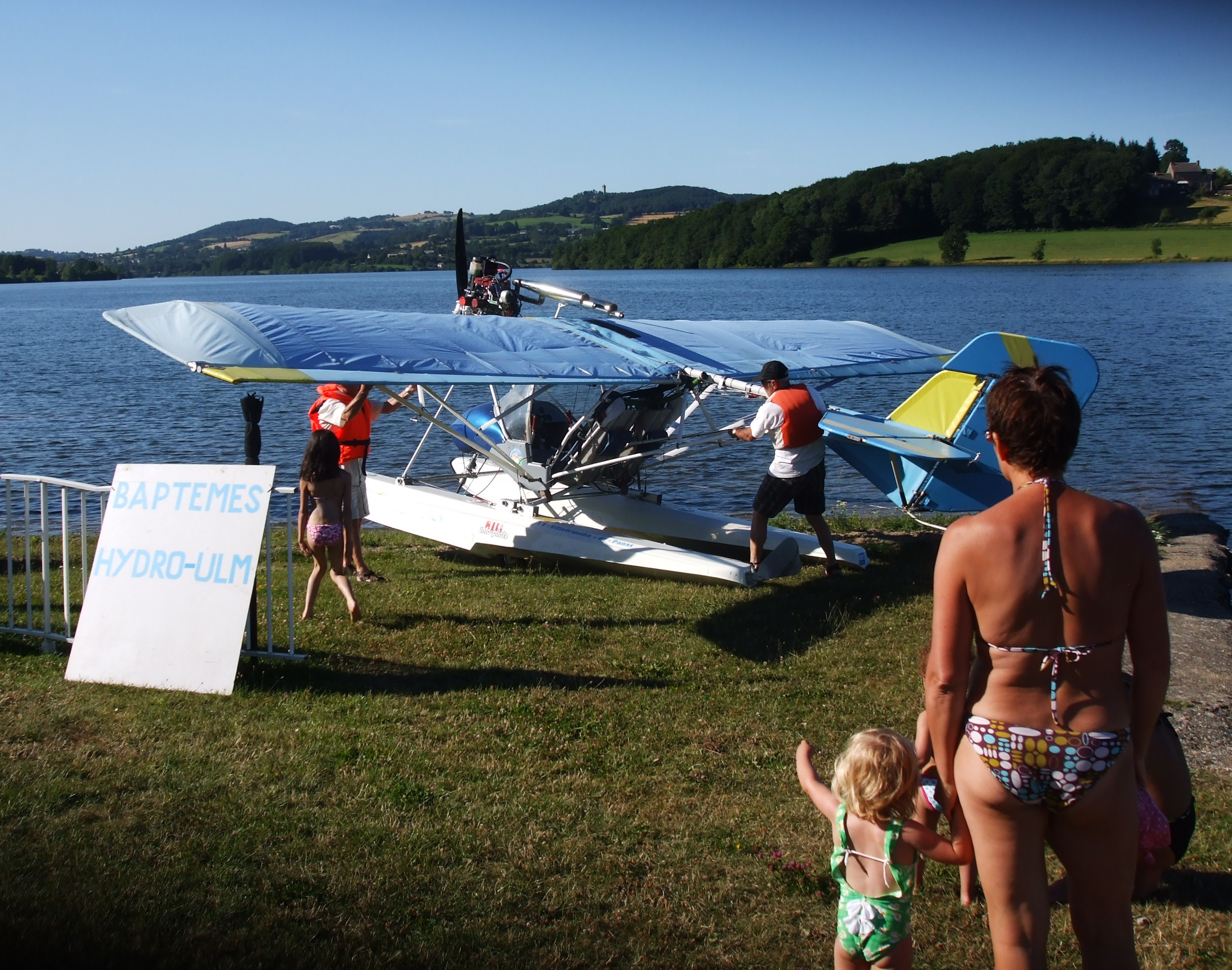
