= Rullac-Saint-Cirq =

Commune in Occitanie, France

- Commune
- Location of Rullac-Saint-Cirq
- Location within France Location within Occitanie
- Coordinates: 44°07′50″N 2°29′28″E
- Country: France
- Region: Occitania
- Department: Aveyron
- Arrondissement: Millau
- Canton: Monts du Réquistanais
- Intercommunality: Réquistanais

Government
  - Mayor (2023–2026): Gilles Almayrac
- Area^{1}: 32.74 km^{2} (12.64 sq mi)
- Elevation: 520 m (1,710 ft)
- Highest elevation: 671 m (2,201 ft)
- Lowest elevation: 344 m (1,129 ft)
- Population (2023): 340
  - Density: 10/km^{2} (27/sq mi)
- Time zone: UTC+01:00 (CET)
  - Summer (DST): UTC+02:00 (CEST)
- INSEE/Postal code: 12207 /12120
- ^{1} French Land Register data, which excludes lakes, ponds, glaciers > 1 km^{2} (0.386 sq mi or 247 acres) and river estuaries.

Rullac-Saint-Cirq (French pronunciation: [ʁylak sɛ̃ siʁk]; Occitan: Rutlac) is a commune in the Aveyron department in southern France.

== Population ==
Historical population
Year	Pop.	±% p.a.
1968	692	—
1975	556	−3.08%
1982	519	−0.98%
1990	508	−0.27%
1999	407	−2.43%
2007	358	−1.59%
2012	388	+1.62%
2017	344	−2.38%
2023	340	−0.19%
Source: INSEE

== Geography ==
The river Céor forms part of the commune's northern border.

== See also ==
- Communes of the Aveyron department
