= Lac de Saint-Amans =

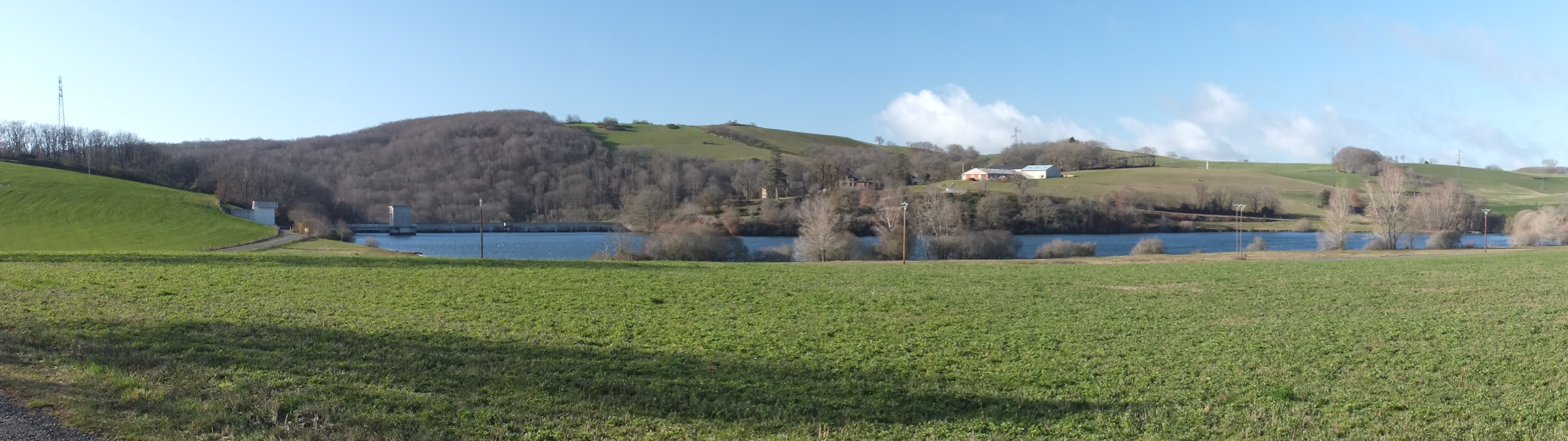
- Lac de Saint-Amans

- Location within France
- Location: Aveyron
- Coordinates: 44°4′16″N 2°45′15″E
- Type: reservoir
- Primary outflows: ruisseau de St-Amans
- Basin countries: France
- Surface area: 0.11 km^{2} (0.042 sq mi)
- Max. depth: 26 m (85 ft)
- Surface elevation: 727 m (2,385 ft)

Lac de Saint-Amans is an artificial lake in Le Truel, Aveyron, France close to Villefranche-de-Panat, and 500m above the Tarn. At an elevation of 727 m, it has surface area of 0.11 km^{2}. It is captured by the Barrage de Saint-Amans. It is a holding reservoir, taking water between the Lac de Villefranche-de-Panat and the hydro-electric power station at Le Pouget power station.

Diagram of the linked rivers, reservoirs, dams, pipelines, pumping stations and power stations.
