= Henri Grimal =

French writer and historian

- Born: 19 July 1910; Arvieu (Aveyron)
- Died: 3 November 2012 (aged 102); Paris
- Occupation: Historian

Henri Grimal (19 July 1910 – 3 November 2012) was a 20th-century French writer and historian, a specialist of the British Empire, the Commonwealth of Nations and the history of decolonisation. Agrégé d'histoire (1939), he taught at the lycée Janson-de-Sailly, the lycée Henri-IV, the lycée Louis-le-Grand, the Sorbonne, as well as at Princeton University.

== Works (selection) ==
- 1948: Derrière les barricades, Éditions Bourrelier
- 1956: Agricola, de Tacite, Éditions Hachette
- 1962: Le Commonwealth, Presses universitaires de France
- 1962: Histoire du Commonwealth britannique, Presses universitaires de France
- 1965: La Décolonisation, 1919-1963, Librairie Armand Colin, prix Broquette-Gonin of the Académie Française (1966) (reprints in 1967, 1970, 1985 and 1999 ISBN 978-2870271575, and in 1978 by Westview Press: Decolonialization : the British, Dutch, French and Belgian Empires: 1919-1963)
- 1971: De l'Empire britannique au Commonwealth, Librairie Armand Colin (rééd. 1999). ISBN 978-2200251581

Henri Grimal also published in 2005 the first volume of his souvenirs: L'Envol, at Presses de l'université des Sciences sociales de Toulouse, an account of his young years in the region of his native village in the 1920s. ISBN 978-2-915699-06-7
