= Salles-Curan =

Commune in Occitanie, France

- Commune
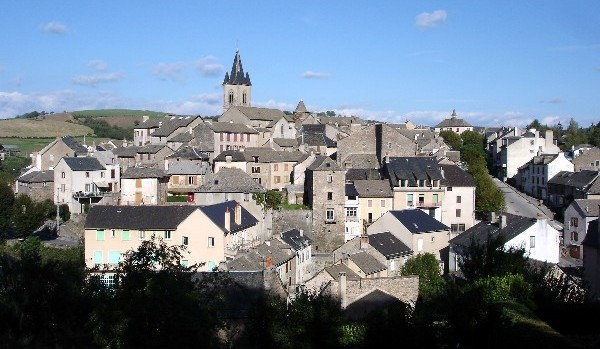
- A general view of Salles-Curan

- Coat of arms
- Location of Salles-Curan
- Location within France Location within Occitanie
- Coordinates: 44°11′00″N 2°47′16″E
- Country: France
- Region: Occitania
- Department: Aveyron
- Arrondissement: Millau
- Canton: Raspes et Lévezou
- Intercommunality: Lévézou Pareloup

Government
  - Mayor (2020–2026): Maurice Combettes
- Area^{1}: 93.9 km^{2} (36.3 sq mi)
- Elevation: 820 m (2,690 ft)
- Highest elevation: 1,084 m (3,556 ft)
- Lowest elevation: 547 m (1,795 ft)
- Population (2023): 1,043
  - Density: 11.1/km^{2} (28.8/sq mi)
- Time zone: UTC+01:00 (CET)
  - Summer (DST): UTC+02:00 (CEST)
- INSEE/Postal code: 12253 /12410
- ^{1} French Land Register data, which excludes lakes, ponds, glaciers > 1 km^{2} (0.386 sq mi or 247 acres) and river estuaries.

Salles-Curan (French pronunciation: [sal kyʁɑ̃]; Occitan: Las Salas) is a 1200 ha commune in the Aveyron department in southern France. The commune's economy is mostly linked to tourism driven by activities around the Lac de Pareloup, one of the largest artificial lakes in southern France.

== Geography ==
The lac de Pareloup forms part of the commune's northern border.

The river Céor has its source in the western part of the commune.

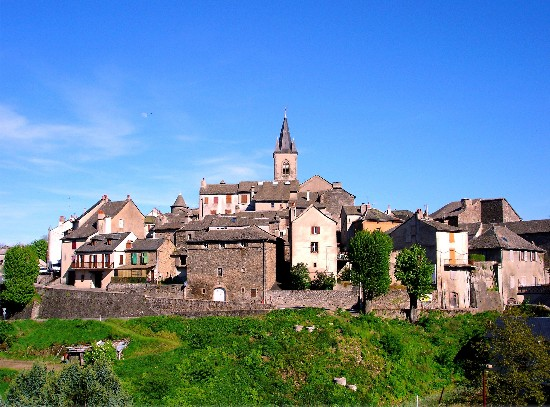
View of Salles-Curan

== Population ==
Historical population
Year	Pop.	±% p.a.
1968	1,538	—
1975	1,491	−0.44%
1982	1,419	−0.70%
1990	1,277	−1.31%
1999	1,088	−1.76%
2007	1,063	−0.29%
2012	1,068	+0.09%
2017	1,043	−0.47%
2023	1,043	+0.00%
Source: INSEE

== See also ==
- Communes of the Aveyron department
