= Lac de Pareloup =

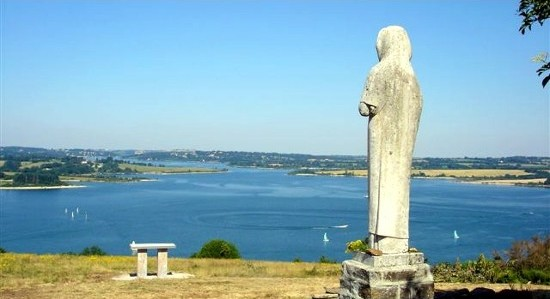

- Location within France
- Location: Aveyron
- Coordinates: 44.205408°N 2.757167°E
- Type: reservoir
- Primary inflows: Vioulou, pumping station at Bage- taking water from the Viaur and the Bage
- Primary outflows: Vioulou, lac de Villefranche-de-Panat via the Alrance power station
- Catchment area: 376 km^{2} (145 sq mi)
- Basin countries: France
- Surface area: 12.6 km^{2} (4.9 sq mi)
- Water volume: 169 million cubic metres (137,000 acre⋅ft)
- Surface elevation: 805 m (2,641 ft)

Lac de Pareloup (French pronunciation: [lak də paʁəlu]; Occitan: Lac de Paralop; English: Pareloup Lake) is a lake in Aveyron, France. It lies on the Lévézou plateau, 25 km south east of Rodez.

== Description ==
At an elevation of 805 m, its surface area is 12.6 km^{2}. The impermeable granite rocks are very suitable for water capture though the undulating landscape alone does not allow the vertical drops needed for power generation. However, in 1950 the barrage was built and a goit dug leading to the Lac de Villefranche-de-Panat where the waters drop 461m vertically to the power station at Le Pouget on the Tarn river.

This is the fifth largest hydroelectric reservoir by area in France having an area of 1260 hectares. It was formed by creating a dam across the Vioulou, and pumping water 6.4 km, up 80 m from the 53-hectare Bage reservoir on the Bage river and water from the 200 ha Pont-de-Salars reservoir on the Viaur.

Waters from Pareloup can be directed either through the downstream Viaur to the power station at Thuries or through a 10.9 km tunnel to the power station at Alrance at the head of the Lac de Villefranche-de-Panat. A small amount (3.5 hm^{3}) is extracted for use as drinking water in Rodez and Ségala. Pareloup has a catchment area of 376 km^{2}: 160 km^{2} from the Vioulou, Gourde and Céor, 216 km^{2} from the Viaur and Bage. The dam at Pareloup is 43.45 m high and 232 m long- it is 15.87 metres thick at its base, tapering to 2.77 m at the rim. It holds back 167 million m^{3} of usable water.

Diagram of the linked rivers, reservoirs, dams, pipelines, pumping stations and power stations.
