= Céor =

River in southern France

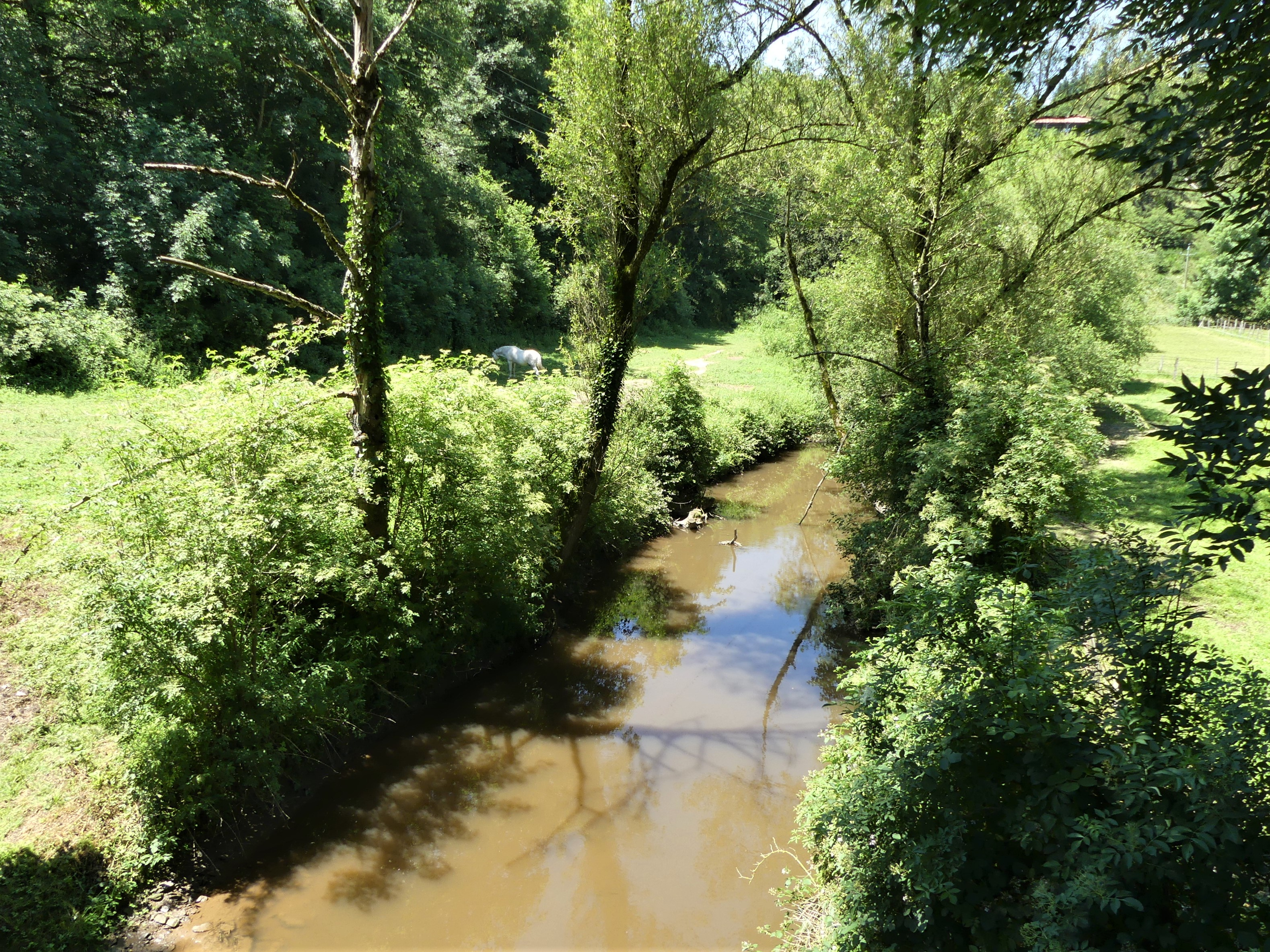

- Location within France Location within Occitanie

Location
- Country: France

Physical characteristics
- Source
  - location: Salles-Curan
  - coordinates: 44°09′47″N 02°41′42″E
  - elevation: 910 m (2,990 ft)
- Mouth
  - location: Viaur
  - coordinates: 44°07′27″N 02°29′29″E
  - elevation: 305 m (1,001 ft)
- Length: 55.8 km (34.7 mi)
- Basin size: 340 km^{2} (130 sq mi)
- Discharge
  - average: 4.6 m^{3}/s (160 cu ft/s)

Basin features
- Progression: Viaur→ Aveyron→ Tarn→ Garonne→ Gironde estuary→ Atlantic Ocean

The Céor (French pronunciation: [seɔʁ]) is a 55.8 km (34.7 mi) long river in the Aveyron department in southern France. Its source is at Salles-Curan, 3.5 km (2.2 mi) southwest of the lac de Pareloup. It flows generally west-southwest. It is a left tributary of the Viaur, into which it flows at Saint-Just-sur-Viaur.

== Communes along its course ==
This list is ordered from source to mouth:

- Aveyron: Salles-Curan, Arvieu, Salmiech, Cassagnes-Bégonhès, Centrès, Rullac-Saint-Cirq, Meljac, Saint-Just-sur-Viaur
