= Salmiech =

Commune in Occitanie, France

- Commune
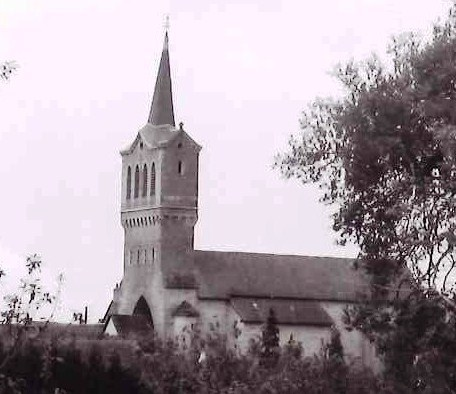
- The Church of Carcenac-Salmiech
- Location of Salmiech
- Location within France Location within Occitanie
- Coordinates: 44°10′56″N 2°34′18″E
- Country: France
- Region: Occitania
- Department: Aveyron
- Arrondissement: Millau
- Canton: Monts du Réquistanais

Government
  - Mayor (2020–2026): Jean-Paul Labit
- Area^{1}: 28.16 km^{2} (10.87 sq mi)
- Elevation: 600 m (2,000 ft)
- Highest elevation: 846 m (2,776 ft)
- Lowest elevation: 517 m (1,696 ft)
- Population (2023): 757
  - Density: 26.9/km^{2} (69.6/sq mi)
- Time zone: UTC+01:00 (CET)
  - Summer (DST): UTC+02:00 (CEST)
- INSEE/Postal code: 12255 /12120
- ^{1} French Land Register data, which excludes lakes, ponds, glaciers > 1 km^{2} (0.386 sq mi or 247 acres) and river estuaries.

Salmiech (French pronunciation: [salmjɛʃ]; Languedocien: Saumièg or Salmièg) is a commune in the Aveyron department in the Occitanie region in southern France.

== Geography ==
The village lies on the right bank of the Céor, which flows west through its southern part.

== Population ==
Historical population
Year	Pop.	±% p.a.
1968	951	—
1975	864	−1.36%
1982	741	−2.17%
1990	671	−1.23%
1999	728	+0.91%
2007	703	−0.44%
2012	734	+0.87%
2017	773	+1.04%
2023	757	−0.35%
Source: INSEE

== See also ==
- Communes of the Aveyron department
