= Saint-Just-sur-Viaur =

Commune in Occitanie, France

- Commune
- Location of Saint-Just-sur-Viaur
- Location within France Location within Occitanie
- Coordinates: 44°07′32″N 2°22′01″E
- Country: France
- Region: Occitania
- Department: Aveyron
- Arrondissement: Villefranche-de-Rouergue
- Canton: Ceor-Ségala

Government
  - Mayor (2020–2026): Yvon Besombes
- Area^{1}: 25.1 km^{2} (9.7 sq mi)
- Elevation: 305 m (1,001 ft)
- Highest elevation: 625 m (2,051 ft)
- Lowest elevation: 300 m (980 ft)
- Population (2023): 216
  - Density: 8.61/km^{2} (22.3/sq mi)
- Time zone: UTC+01:00 (CET)
  - Summer (DST): UTC+02:00 (CEST)
- INSEE/Postal code: 12235 /12170
- ^{1} French Land Register data, which excludes lakes, ponds, glaciers > 1 km^{2} (0.386 sq mi or 247 acres) and river estuaries.

Saint-Just-sur-Viaur (French pronunciation: [sɛ̃ ʒyst syʁ vjɔʁ], literally Saint-Just on Viaur; Languedocien: Sent Just de Viaur) is a commune in the Aveyron department in southern France.

== Geography ==
The river Céor flows into the Viaur in the commune.

== Population ==
Historical population
Year	Pop.	±% p.a.
1968	427	—
1975	348	−2.88%
1982	308	−1.73%
1990	267	−1.77%
1999	222	−2.03%
2007	206	−0.93%
2012	208	+0.19%
2017	209	+0.10%
2023	216	+0.55%
Source: INSEE

== See also ==
- Communes of the Aveyron department
