= Villefranche-de-Panat =

Commune in Occitanie, France

Villefranche de Panat Vilafranca de Panat (Occitan)
- Commune
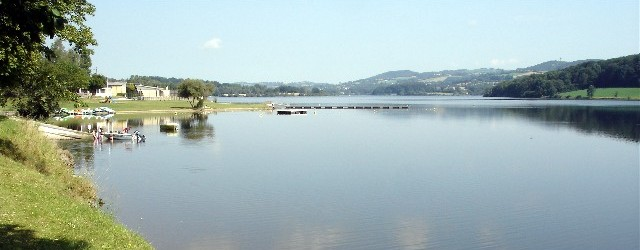
- Lac de Villefranche-de-Panat

- Coat of arms
- Location of Villefranche de Panat
- Location within France Location within Occitanie
- Coordinates: 44°05′22″N 2°42′20″E
- Country: France
- Region: Occitania
- Department: Aveyron
- Arrondissement: Millau
- Canton: Raspes et Lévezou
- Intercommunality: Lévézou Pareloup

Government
  - Mayor (2020–2026): Michel Vimini
- Area^{1}: 29.13 km^{2} (11.25 sq mi)
- Elevation: 720 m (2,360 ft)
- Highest elevation: 984 m (3,228 ft)
- Lowest elevation: 260 m (850 ft)
- Population (2023): 677
  - Density: 23.2/km^{2} (60.2/sq mi)
- Time zone: UTC+01:00 (CET)
  - Summer (DST): UTC+02:00 (CEST)
- INSEE/Postal code: 12299 /12430
- ^{1} French Land Register data, which excludes lakes, ponds, glaciers > 1 km^{2} (0.386 sq mi or 247 acres) and river estuaries.

Villefranche-de-Panat (French: [vilfʁɑ̃ʃ də pana]; Occitan: Vilafranca de Panat [ˌbilɔˈfɾaŋkɔ ðe paˈnat]) is a commune located in the Aveyron department in southern France.

== Population ==
Historical population
Year	Pop.	±% p.a.
1968	804	—
1975	775	−0.52%
1982	908	+2.29%
1990	711	−3.01%
1999	762	+0.77%
2007	777	+0.24%
2012	729	−1.27%
2017	703	−0.72%
2023	677	−0.63%
Source: INSEE

== See also ==
- Communes of the Aveyron department
