= Pont-de-Salars =

Commune in Occitanie, France

- Commune
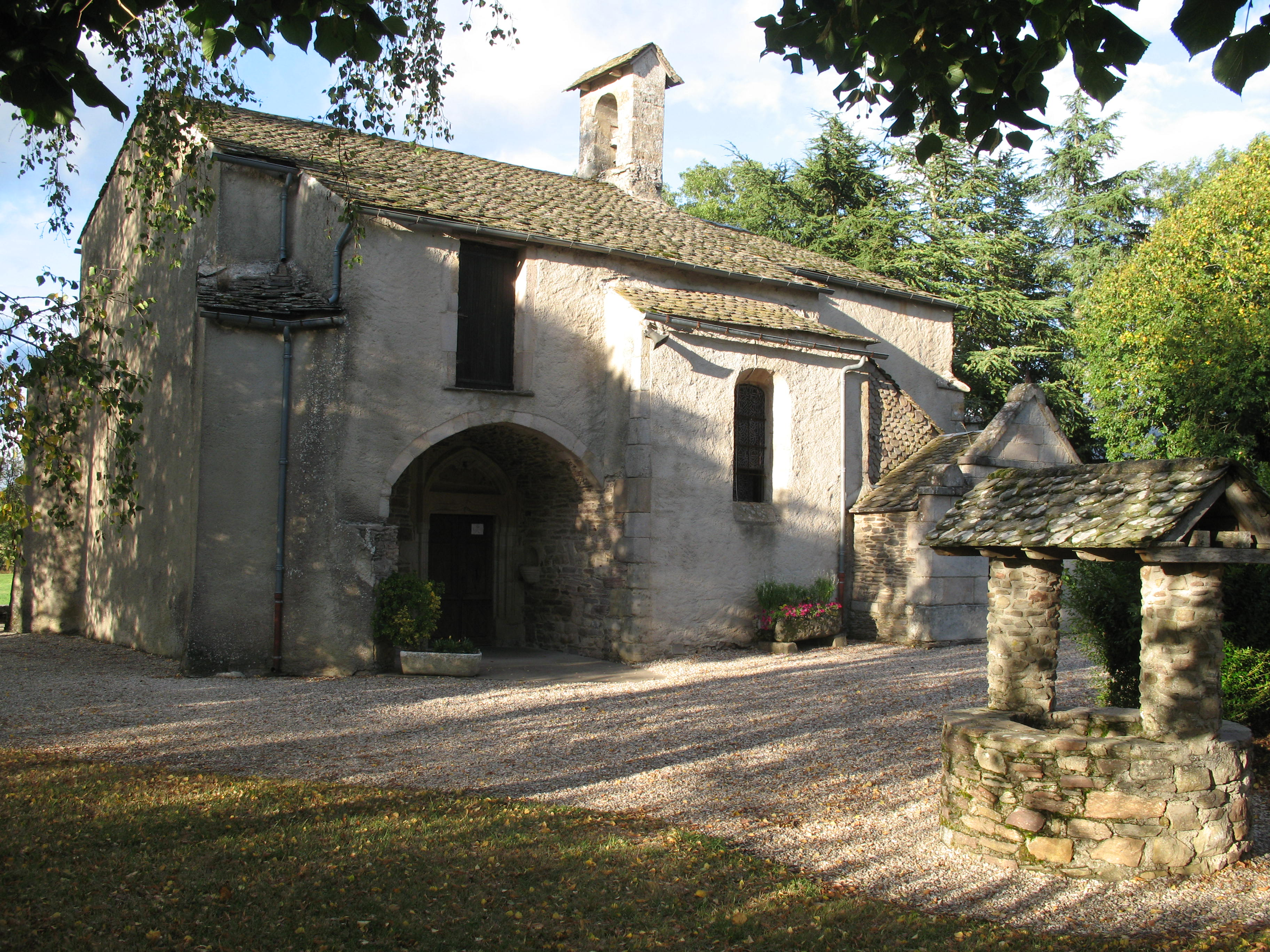
- The chapel of Our Lady of Salars

- Coat of arms
- Location of Pont-de-Salars
- Location within France Location within Occitanie
- Coordinates: 44°16′55″N 2°43′42″E
- Country: France
- Region: Occitania
- Department: Aveyron
- Arrondissement: Millau
- Canton: Raspes et Lévezou
- Intercommunality: Pays de Salars

Government
  - Mayor (2020–2026): Daniel Julien
- Area^{1}: 44.9 km^{2} (17.3 sq mi)
- Elevation: 684 m (2,244 ft)
- Highest elevation: 883 m (2,897 ft)
- Lowest elevation: 570 m (1,870 ft)
- Population (2023): 1,623
  - Density: 36.1/km^{2} (93.6/sq mi)
- Time zone: UTC+01:00 (CET)
  - Summer (DST): UTC+02:00 (CEST)
- INSEE/Postal code: 12185 /12290
- ^{1} French Land Register data, which excludes lakes, ponds, glaciers > 1 km^{2} (0.386 sq mi or 247 acres) and river estuaries.

Pont-de-Salars (French pronunciation: [pɔ̃ də salaʁ]; Languedocien: Lo Pònt de Salars) is a commune in the Aveyron department in southern France.

== Population ==
Historical population
| Year | Pop. | ±% p.a. |
|---|---|---|
| 1968 | 1,229 | — |
| 1975 | 1,300 | +0.81% |
| 1982 | 1,391 | +0.97% |
| 1990 | 1,422 | +0.28% |
| 1999 | 1,414 | −0.06% |
| 2007 | 1,544 | +1.11% |
| 2012 | 1,642 | +1.24% |
| 2017 | 1,652 | +0.12% |
| 2023 | 1,623 | −0.29% |
Source: INSEE

== See also ==
- Communes of the Aveyron department
