= Viaur =

River in southern France

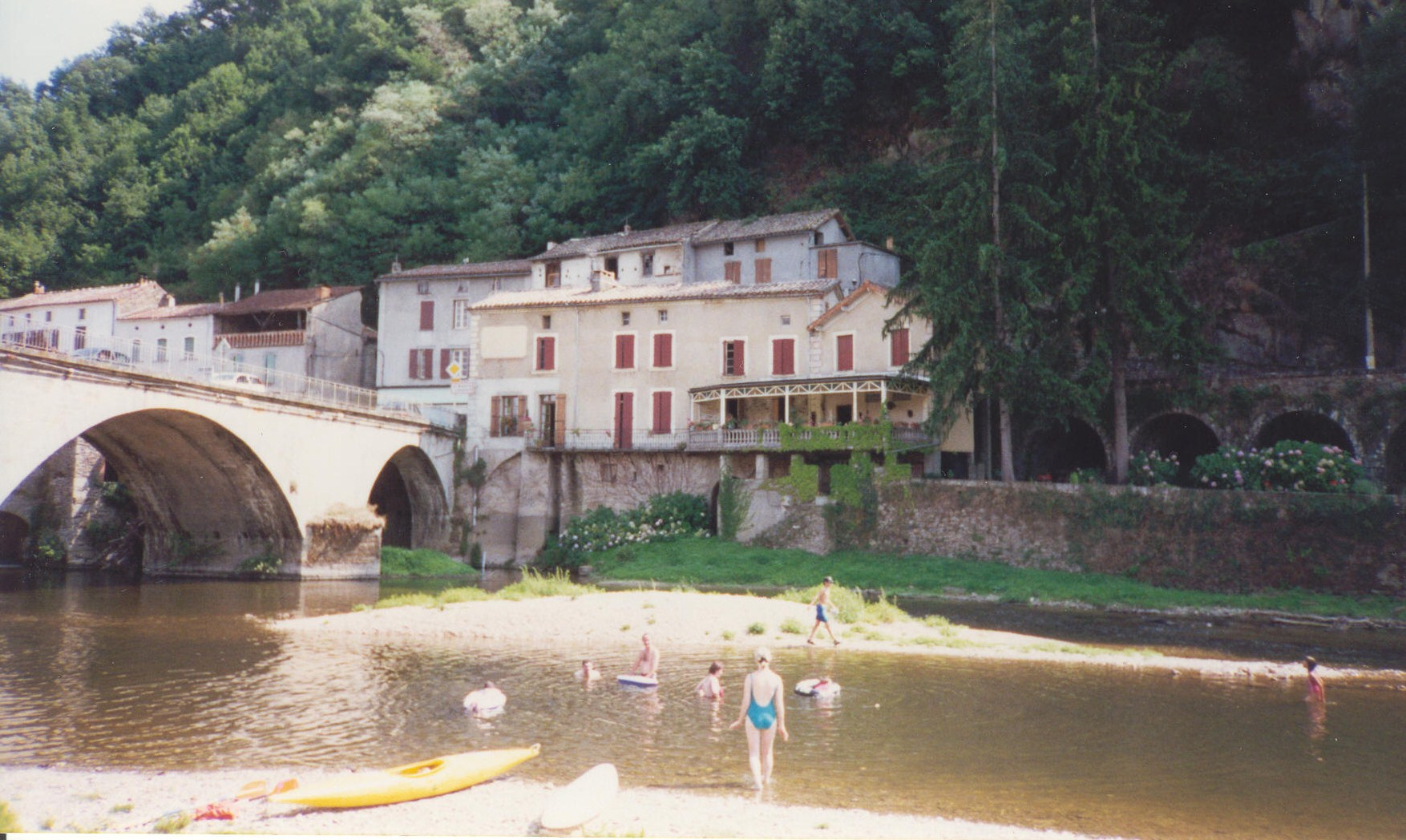
- The Viaur at Laguépie

- Location within France Location within Occitanie

Location
- Country: France

Physical characteristics
- Source
  - location: Massif Central
  - elevation: 1,070 m (3,510 ft)
- Mouth
  - location: Aveyron
  - coordinates: 44°8′39″N 1°58′1″E
- Length: 168 km (104 mi)
- Basin size: 1,530 km^{2} (590 sq mi)
- Discharge
  - average: 6 m^{3}/s (210 cu ft/s)

Basin features
- Progression: Aveyron→ Tarn→ Garonne→ Gironde estuary→ Atlantic Ocean

The Viaur (French pronunciation: [vjɔʁ]) is a 168-kilometre-long (104 mi) river in south-western France. It is a left tributary of the Aveyron. Its source is in the southern Massif Central, north of Millau. It flows generally west through the following departments and towns:

- Aveyron: Pont-de-Salars
- Tarn: Pampelonne
- Tarn-et-Garonne: Laguépie

The Viaur flows into the Aveyron in Laguépie.

Its main tributary is the Céor.
