= 2020 FIM Enduro World Championship =

World championship

The 2020 World Enduro Championship is the 31st season of the FIM World Enduro Championship. The season consists of eight events.

Brad Freeman goes into the championship after winning both the EnduroGP and Enduro 1 classes in 2019. Loic Larrieu is the reigning Enduro 2 champion, with Steve Holcombe going into the season after taking the Enduro 3 title last year.

== Calendar ==
An eight-round calendar was announced in December 2019.

Due to the COVID-19 pandemic, the start of the season was postponed. Portuguese and Spanish Grand Prix postponement was announced on 12 March and on 31 March the events in Italy and Hungary were postponed. In May, the GP of Sweden was cancelled, and GP of Estonia is rescheduled or possibly cancelled as well.

Round	Event	Location	Dates
1	France	Requista	18–20 September
2	Italy	Spoleto	25–27 September
3	Portugal	Marco de Canaveses	6–8 November
4	Portugal	Marco de Canaveses	13–15 November

== EnduroGP ==
=== Riders Championship ===
Pos	Rider	Bike	Class	FRA (France)		ITA (Italy)		POR (Portugal)		POR (Portugal)		Points
1	(United Kingdom) Steve Holcombe	Beta	Enduro 2	1	1	2	1	1	3	2	2	146
2	(United Kingdom) Brad Freeman	Beta	Enduro 3	2	2	1	2	2	2	1	3	140
3	(Italy) Andrea Verona	TM	Enduro 1	4	3	4	5	4	5	4	5	100
4	(Italy) Thomas Oldrati	Honda	Enduro 1	6	8	3	4	6	4	5	6	90
5	(France) Loïc Larrieu	TM	Enduro 2	3	5	5	3	8	10	11	7	80
6	(Spain) Josep Garcia	KTM	Enduro 2					3	1	3	1	70
7	(Spain) Jaume Betriu	KTM	Enduro 3	10	4	6	8	10	7	6	9	69
8	(United Kingdom) Daniel McCanney	Honda	Enduro 2	11	6	8	9	7	6	10	4	68
9	(Belgium) Antoine Magain	Sherco	Enduro 1	13	9	9	7	5	14	8	10	53
10	(Italy) Matteo Cavallo	Sherco	Enduro 2	8	13	12	10	9	12	7	Ret	41
11	(France) Christophe Charlier	Beta	Enduro 1	7	12	7	Ret	Ret	DNS	9	8	37
12	(United Kingdom) Joe Wootton	Husqvarna	Enduro 2	25	Ret	11	6	13	9	12	13	32
13	(France) Antoine Basset	Beta	Enduro 3	14	19	10	12	11	8	14	14	29
14	(Italy) Davide Guarneri	TM	Enduro 3	5	11	29	13					19
15	(France) Jeremy Tarroux	Sherco	Enduro 1	9	7							16
16	(France) David Abgrall	Beta	Enduro 3	24	15	18	15	12	13	13	12	16
17	(Spain) Cristobal Guerrero	Beta	Enduro 3	18	14	14	Ret	18	18	17	11	9
18	(Spain) Marc Sans	KTM	Enduro 3	16	10			19	17	15	19	7
19	(Finland) Eero Remes	Yamaha	Enduro 1	22	17	13	21	14	Ret	20	15	6
20	(Spain) Enric Francisco	Sherco	Enduro 3	19	22	20	11					5
21	(Italy) Rudy Moroni	KTM	Enduro 3	27	24	Ret	18	16	11	18	17	5
22	(Italy) Alex Salvini	Honda	Enduro 2	12	16	Ret	DNS					4
23	(France) Anthony Geslin	Beta	Enduro 2	20	18	17	14	15	Ret	16	18	3
24	(France) Max Vial	Husqvarna	Enduro 2	15	28	25	17	21	20	24	Ret	1
25	(France) Hugo Blanjoue	Honda	Enduro 2	17	20	15	Ret					1
26	(Spain) Kirian Mirabet	Honda	Enduro 1			Ret	DNS					1
26	(Spain) Kirian Mirabet	Honda	Enduro 2					17	15	19	Ret	1
Pos	Rider	Bike	Class	FRA (France)		ITA (Italy)		POR (Portugal)		POR (Portugal)		Points

=== Enduro 1 ===
Team	Constructor	No	Rider	Rounds
Aluns Motor	Sherco	6	(Sweden) Richard Alun	1–2
Beta Boano Costa Ligure	Beta	10	(Italy) Davide Soreca	All
TNT Corse	KTM	19	(Italy) Tommaso Montanari	2
Honda RedMoto World Enduro Team	Honda	22	(Italy) Thomas Oldrati	All
Oxmoto	Beta	23	(France) Christophe Charlier	All
WP Eric Augé Team	KTM	29	(Argentina) Nicolas Kutulas	3–4
Honda Redmoto Lunigiana Racing Team	Honda	31	(United Kingdom) Alex Snow	1–2
Johansson MPE	Yamaha	34	(Finland) Eero Remes	All
Johansson MPE	Yamaha	88	(Norway) Kevin Burud	All
Team Honda Impala	Honda	38	(Spain) Kirian Mirabet	2
	Beta	52	(Portugal) Diogo Ventura	3
ASD Entrophy Motorbike	Beta	66	(Italy) Filippo Grimani	2
Sherco Factory Racing	Sherco	71	(Belgium) Antoine Magain	All
Sherco Factory Racing	Sherco	81	(France) Jeremy Tarroux	1
TM Factory Racing Team	TM	98	(France) Nathan Bererd	3–4
TM Factory Racing Team	TM	99	(Italy) Andrea Verona	All

=== Riders Championship ===
Pos	Rider	Bike	FRA (France)		ITA (Italy)		POR (Portugal)		POR (Portugal)		Points
1	(Italy) Andrea Verona	TM	1	1	2	2	1	2	1	1	151
2	(Italy) Thomas Oldrati	Honda	2	3	1	1	3	1	2	2	141
3	(Belgium) Antoine Magain	Sherco	5	4	4	3	2	3	3	4	112
4	(Finland) Eero Remes	Yamaha	6	6	5	6	4	Ret	5	5	76
5	(Italy) Davide Soreca	Beta	7	7	6	Ret	7	4	6	6	70
6	(France) Christophe Charlier	Beta	3	5	3	Ret	Ret	DNS	4	3	69
7	(Norway) Kevin Burud	Yamaha	9	10	11	7	8	Ret	8	7	52
8	(United Kingdom) Alex Snow	Honda	8	8	8	4					37
9	(France) Jeremy Tarroux	Sherco	4	2							30
10	(Sweden) Richard Alun	Sherco	10	9	9	9					27
11	(Portugal) Diogo Ventura	Beta					5	5			22
12	(Italy) Tommaso Montanari	KTM			7	5					20
13	(Argentina) Nicolas Kutulas	KTM					6	DNS	7	Ret	19
14	(Italy) Filippo Grimani	Beta			10	8					14
	(France) Nathan Bererd	TM					Ret	DNS	Ret	DNS	0
	(Spain) Kirian Mirabet	Honda			Ret	DNS					0
Pos	Rider	Bike	FRA (France)		ITA (Italy)		POR (Portugal)		POR (Portugal)		Points

=== Enduro 2 ===
Team	Constructor	No	Rider	Rounds
JET Zanardo	Husqvarna	3	(United Kingdom) Joe Wootton	All
JET Zanardo	Husqvarna	32	(Australia) Andrew Wilksch	3–4
TM Factory Racing Team	TM	4	(France) Loïc Larrieu	All
S2 Motorsports Honda Redmoto	Honda	9	(Italy) Alex Salvini	1–2
S2 Motorsports Honda Redmoto	Honda	38	(Spain) Kirian Mirabet	3–4
Wolff Moto KTM	KTM	11	(France) Mika Barnes	1
	KTM	14	(Italy) Federico Ulissi	2
Sherco Factory Racing	Sherco	25	(Italy) Matteo Cavallo	All
Red Bull KTM Factory Racing	KTM	26	(Spain) Josep Garcia	3–4
Red Bull KTM Factory Racing	KTM	30	(Germany) Manuel Lettenbichler	4
Dafy Enduro Team	Husqvarna	27	(France) Jeremy Miroir	1
Team To Enduro CBO Group	Beta	29	(France) Vincent Gautie	1
Honda RedMoto World Enduro Team	Honda	43	(United Kingdom) Daniel McCanney	All
Team GST Berlin	KTM	48	(Germany) Edward Hübner	1–2
Team Honda ORC	Honda	56	(France) Hugo Blanjoue	1–2
Oxmoto	Beta	61	(France) Alex Pichaud	1–2
Oxmoto	Beta	64	(France) Anthony Geslin	All
KBS Team	Husqvarna	65	(Czech Republic) Patrik Markvart	1–2
Team Beta Factory Racing	Beta	70	(United Kingdom) Steve Holcombe	All
Team Specia ASD	Honda	83	(Italy) Alessandro Battig	1
Atomic Moto	Husqvarna	94	(France) Max Vial	All

=== Riders Championship ===
Pos	Rider	Bike	FRA (France)		ITA (Italy)		POR (Portugal)		POR (Portugal)		Points
1	(United Kingdom) Steve Holcombe	Beta	1	1	1	1	1	2	1	2	154
2	(France) Loïc Larrieu	TM	2	2	2	2	4	5	5	4	116
3	(United Kingdom) Daniel McCanney	Honda	4	3	3	4	3	3	4	3	114
4	(Italy) Matteo Cavallo	Sherco	3	4	5	5	5	6	3	Ret	86
5	(United Kingdom) Joe Wootton	Husqvarna	10	Ret	4	3	6	4	6	5	78
6	(Spain) Josep Garcia	KTM					2	1	2	1	74
7	(France) Anthony Geslin	Beta	8	6	7	6	7	Ret	7	6	65
8	(France) Max Vial	Husqvarna	6	10	8	7	9	8	11	Ret	53
9	(France) Hugo Blanjoue	Honda	7	7	6	Ret					28
10	(Germany) Edward Hübner	KTM	12	9	9	8					26
11	(Spain) Kirian Mirabet	Honda					8	7	8	Ret	25
12	(Italy) Alex Salvini	Honda	5	5	Ret	DNS					22
13	(Australia) Andrew Wilksch	Husqvarna					Ret	DNS	9	7	16
14	(France) Alex Pichaud	Beta	15	12	11	10					16
15	(France) Jeremy Miroir	Husqvarna	9	11							12
16	(France) Mika Barnes	KTM	13	8							11
17	(Italy) Federico Ulissi	KTM			12	9					11
18	(Czech Republic) Patrik Markvart	Husqvarna	14	Ret	10	Ret					8
19	(Germany) Manuel Lettenbichler	KTM							10	Ret	6
20	(France) Vincent Gautie	Beta	11	Ret							5
	(Italy) Alessandro Battig	Honda	16	Ret							0
Pos	Rider	Bike	FRA (France)		ITA (Italy)		POR (Portugal)		POR (Portugal)		Points

=== Enduro 3 ===
Team	Constructor	No	Rider	Rounds
Sebino	Beta	2	(Italy) Gianluca Martini	2
KTM Spain FN Speed Team	KTM	5	(Spain) Jaume Betriu	All
Atomic Moto	Beta	7	(France) Antoine Basset	All
Atomic Moto	Beta	28	(France) Thibaut Passet	1–3
SO7 Audiowise Beta Team	Beta	8	(Japan) Tomoki Ogami	2
Team Beta Factory Racing	Beta	12	(United Kingdom) Brad Freeman	All
Beta Boano Costa Ligure	Beta	15	(Italy) Nicola Recchia	1–2
Beta Trueba Racing	Beta	16	(Spain) Cristobal Guerrero	All
Sherco Factory Racing	Sherco	21	(Spain) Enric Francisco	1–2
Team To Enduro CBO Group	Beta	24	(France) Jean-Baptiste Brecheteau	1
Team To Enduro CBO Group	Beta	58	(France) Julien Raquidel	1
E/50 Racing	TM	39	(Italy) Davide Guarneri	1–2
WP Eric Augé Team	KTM	41	(Spain) Marc Sans	1, 3–4
Beta Motor Scandinavia	Beta	74	(Sweden) Jimmy Wicksell	1
Team Pro Racing Sport KTM	KTM	89	(Italy) Rudy Moroni	All
Sherco Czech Team	Sherco	90	(Czech Republic) Jaromir Romancik	1–2
Oxmoto	Beta	91	(France) David Abgrall	All
Jarsen Enduro Team	KTM	93	(Czech Republic) Jiri Hadek	1–2

=== Riders Championship ===
Pos	Rider	Bike	FRA (France)		ITA (Italy)		POR (Portugal)		POR (Portugal)		Points
1	(United Kingdom) Brad Freeman	Beta	1	1	1	1	1	1	1	1	160
2	(Spain) Jaume Betriu	KTM	3	2	2	2	2	2	2	2	134
3	(France) Antoine Basset	Beta	4	7	3	4	3	3	4	5	104
4	(France) David Abgrall	Beta	8	6	5	6	4	5	3	4	91
5	(Spain) Cristobal Guerrero	Beta	6	5	4	Ret	6	7	6	3	78
6	(Spain) Marc Sans	KTM	5	3			7	6	5	7	65
7	(Italy) Rudy Moroni	KTM	9	10	Ret	8	5	4	7	6	64
8	(Italy) Davide Guarneri	TM	2	4	11	5					46
9	(Spain) Enric Francisco	Sherco	7	9	7	3					40
10	(France) Thibaut Passet	Beta	10	8	9	7	Ret	DNS			30
11	(Italy) Nicola Recchia	Beta	11	11	8	10					24
12	(Czech Republic) Jaromir Romancik	Sherco	Ret	Ret	10	9					13
13	(Italy) Gianluca Martini	Beta			6	Ret					10
14	(France) Julien Raquidel	Beta	12	12							8
15	(Sweden) Jimmy Wicksell	Beta	13	14							5
16	(Czech Republic) Jiri Hadek	KTM	15	13	Ret	DNS					4
17	(France) Jean-Baptiste Brecheteau	Beta	14	15							3
	(Japan) Tomoki Ogami	Beta			DSQ	Ret					0
Pos	Rider	Bike	FRA (France)		ITA (Italy)		POR (Portugal)		POR (Portugal)		Points

== Junior ==
=== Riders Championship ===
Pos	Rider	Bike	Class	FRA (France)		ITA (Italy)		POR (Portugal)		POR (Portugal)		Points
1	(New Zealand) Hamish MacDonald	Sherco	Junior 2	2	2	2	1	1	1	1	1	151
2	(France) Theophile Espinasse	Sherco	Junior 2	1	1	1	3	Ret	2	2	5	120
3	(Finland) Roni Kytönen	Honda	Junior 1	3	7	4	5	3	14	3	2	97
4	(Italy) Matteo Pavoni	Beta	Junior 2	8	3	3	7	6	5	7	3	92
5	(Australia) Wil Ruprecht	Beta	Junior 2	6	4	16	2	2	3	5	DNS	83
6	(Chile) Ruy Barbosa	Husqvarna	Junior 1	4	13	6	4	4	6	9	4	82
7	(Brazil) Bruno Crivilin	Honda	Junior 1	15	8	7	6	8	4	8	8	65
8	(Italy) Lorenzo Macoritto	Beta	Junior 1	5	5	14	10	13	8	4	Ret	54
9	(Spain) Bernat Cortes	KTM	Junior 2	17	16	10	8	9	7	6	9	47
10	(Sweden) Max Ahlin	Husqvarna	Junior 2	14	18	8	12	12	10	10	6	40
11	(Spain) Pau Tomas	Beta	Junior 1	18	15	5	13	14	9	11	7	38
12	(France) Antoine Criq	Sherco	Junior 1	22	10	9	9	7	Ret	12	12	37
13	(Belgium) Erik Willems	Husqvarna	Junior 2	12	17	13	14	11	11	13	10	28
14	(Belgium) Matthew Van Oevelen	Husqvarna	Junior 2	9	6	12	11					26
15	(France) Till De Clercq	Husqvarna	Junior 1	10	9	18	17	10	Ret	14	11	26
16	(Czech Republic) Krystof Kouble	Sherco	Junior 2	16	Ret	15	16	5	13	16	Ret	15
17	(France) Antoine Alix	Husqvarna	Junior 1	7	11							14
18	(France) Isaac Devoulx	Yamaha	Junior 1	11	12							9
19	(Spain) Adria Sanchez	KTM	Junior 1	20	19	21	Ret	16	12	15	13	8
20	(Italy) Enrico Zili	Honda	Junior 2			11	15	Ret	DNS	17	Ret	6
21	(France) Luc Fargier	Husqvarna	Junior 2	13	14							5
22	(France) Killian Irigoyen	Beta	Junior 2	25	26	Ret	20	15	Ret	18	14	3
23	(Estonia) Priit Biene	Yamaha	Junior 2	30	27	22	22	19	Ret	20	15	1
Pos	Rider	Bike	Class	FRA (France)		ITA (Italy)		POR (Portugal)		POR (Portugal)		Points

=== Junior 1 ===
Team	Constructor	No	Rider	Rounds
Team Moto Axxe Elite Moto 15	KTM	105	(France) Yann Dupic	1
RFME Junior Team	Beta	106	(Spain) Pau Tomas	All
Sport Camps France	Husqvarna	107	(France) Fabien Poirot	1
Team Sherco Academy France	Sherco	108	(France) Antoine Criq	All
JET Zanardo	Husqvarna	114	(Chile) Ruy Barbosa	All
Johansson MPE	Yamaha	119	(United Kingdom) Alex Walton	1
Team LM Racing	Husqvarna	121	(France) Killian Lunier	1
Team LM Racing	Husqvarna	146	(France) Till De Clercq	All
DG Racing Team	KTM	142	(Italy) Adriano Bellicoso	2
Motoclub Ostra	Beta	151	(Italy) Jacopo Traini	2–4
	Sherco	155	(Netherlands) Max Schwarte	3–4
Honda RedMoto World Enduro Team	Honda	156	(Italy) Francesco Giusti	2
Honda RedMoto World Enduro Team	Honda	163	(Italy) Andrea Conigliaro	2
Bonneton2Roues Enduro Team	Yamaha	166	(France) Guillaume Huertier	1
	Beta	184	(Italy) Luca Pavone	1
Dafy Enduro Team	Husqvarna	188	(France) Antoine Alix	1
	KTM	190	(Spain) David Riera	1
Honda RedMoto World Enduro Team	Honda	191	(Finland) Roni Kytönen	All
KTM Spain	KTM	192	(Spain) Adria Sanchez	All
Beta Boano Costa Ligure	Beta	195	(Italy) Lorenzo Macoritto	All
	Yamaha	197	(France) Isaac Devoulx	1
S2 Motorsports Honda Redmoto	Honda	199	(Brazil) Bruno Crivilin	All

=== Riders Championship ===
Pos	Rider	Bike	FRA (France)		ITA (Italy)		POR (Portugal)		POR (Portugal)		Points
1	(Finland) Roni Kytönen	Honda	1	2	1	2	1	6	1	1	144
2	(Chile) Ruy Barbosa	Husqvarna	2	8	3	1	2	2	4	2	124
3	(Brazil) Bruno Crivilin	Honda	7	3	4	3	4	1	3	4	113
4	(Italy) Lorenzo Macoritto	Beta	3	1	6	5	6	3	2	Ret	98
5	(Spain) Pau Tomas	Beta	8	9	2	6	7	4	5	3	90
6	(France) Antoine Criq	Sherco	12	5	5	4	3	Ret	6	6	74
7	(France) Till De Clercq	Husqvarna	5	4	7	7	5	Ret	7	5	73
8	(Spain) Adria Sanchez	KTM	10	10	9	Ret	8	5	8	7	55
9	(Italy) Jacopo Traini	Beta			8	8	9	Ret	9	Ret	30
10	(France) Antoine Alix	Husqvarna	4	6							23
11	(Netherlands) Max Schwarte	Sherco					10	Ret	10	8	20
12	(France) Isaac Devoulx	Yamaha	6	7							19
13	(Italy) Adriano Bellicoso	KTM			11	9					12
14	(France) Killian Lunier	Husqvarna	11	11							10
15	(United Kingdom) Alex Walton	Yamaha	9	Ret							7
16	(Italy) Andrea Conigliaro	Honda			Ret	10					6
17	(Italy) Francesco Giusti	Honda			10	Ret					6
18	(France) Yann Dupic	KTM	14	12							6
19	(Spain) David Riera	KTM	15	13							4
20	(France) Guillaume Huertier	Yamaha	13	Ret							3
21	(France) Fabien Poirot	Husqvarna	16	14							2
22	(Italy) Luca Pavone	Beta	17	15							1
Pos	Rider	Bike	FRA (France)		ITA (Italy)		POR (Portugal)		POR (Portugal)		Points

=== Junior 2 ===
Team	Constructor	No	Rider	Rounds
Husqvarna Belgium	Husqvarna	203	(Belgium) Matthew Van Oevelen	1–2
Team Sherco Academy France	Sherco	207	(France) Theophile Espinasse	All
Team Sherco Academy France	Sherco	209	(France) Léo Le Quéré	1
Tech 36 Racing Team	Honda	216	(Italy) Enrico Zilli	2–4
Beta Boano Costa Ligure	Beta	217	(Australia) Wil Ruprecht	All
Beta Boano Costa Ligure	Beta	298	(Italy) Matteo Pavoni	All
Engine59 Vukcevic Racing	Sherco	220	(Belgium) Tanguy Gabriel	3
Sherco Czech Team	Sherco	223	(Czech Republic) Krystof Kouble	All
Team MCL	KTM	248	(France) Kilian Bremond	1
Team LM Racing	Husqvarna	249	(France) Luc Fargier	1
Team LM Racing	Beta	266	(France) Neels Theric	1–2
	KTM	251	(France) Marceau Paillasson	1
Johansson MPE	Yamaha	253	(Estonia) Priit Biene	All
KBS Team	Husqvarna	254	(Czech Republic) Adolf Zivny	1–2
Atomic Moto	Beta	264	(France) Killian Irigoyen	All
Team GP Motors	Beta	269	(France) Arnaud Tortosa	1
	Husqvarna	271	(Italy) Enrico Rinaldi	2
Sherco Factory Racing	Sherco	276	(New Zealand) Hamish MacDonald	All
	Husqvarna	277	(Sweden) Max Ahlin	All
RFME Junior Team	KTM	286	(Spain) Bernat Cortes	All
	KTM	290	(Spain) David Riera	3
Ride and Race Husqvarna	Husqvarna	298	(Belgium) Erik Willems	All
Dafy Enduro Team	Husqvarna	299	(France) Thomas Zoldos	1

=== Riders Championship ===
Pos	Rider	Bike	FRA (France)		ITA (Italy)		POR (Portugal)		POR (Portugal)		Points
1	(New Zealand) Hamish MacDonald	Sherco	2	2	2	1	1	1	1	1	151
2	(France) Theophile Espinasse	Sherco	1	1	1	3	Ret	2	2	3	124
3	(Italy) Matteo Pavoni	Beta	4	3	3	4	4	4	5	2	110
4	(Australia) Wil Ruprecht	Beta	3	4	10	2	2	3	3	DNS	98
5	(Spain) Bernat Cortes	KTM	10	7	5	5	5	5	4	5	83
6	(Sweden) Max Ahlin	Husqvarna	8	9	4	7	7	6	6	4	79
7	(Belgium) Erik Willems	Husqvarna	6	8	8	8	6	7	7	6	72
8	(Czech Republic) Krystof Kouble	Sherco	9	Ret	9	10	3	8	8	Ret	51
9	(Belgium) Matthew Van Oevelen	Husqvarna	5	5	7	6					41
10	(France) Killian Irigoyen	Beta	11	12	Ret	12	8	Ret	10	7	36
11	(Estonia) Priit Biene	Yamaha	14	13	13	14	10	Ret	11	8	29
12	(Italy) Enrico Zilli	Honda			6	9	Ret	DNS	9	Ret	24
13	(France) Luc Fargier	Husqvarna	7	6							19
14	(France) Neels Theric	Beta	15	10	11	Ret					12
15	(Czech Republic) Adolf Zivny	Husqvarna	12	Ret	Ret	11					9
16	(France) Thomas Zoldos	Husqvarna	13	11							8
17	(Spain) David Riera	KTM					9	DNS			7
18	(Italy) Enrico Rinaldi	Husqvarna			12	13					7
19	(Belgium) Tanguy Gabriel	Sherco					11	Ret			5
	(France) Arnaud Tortosa	Beta	16	Ret							0
	(France) Leo Le Quere	Sherco	Ret	DNS							0
	(France) Kilian Bremond	KTM	Ret	DNS							0
	(France) Marceau Paillasson	KTM	Ret	DNS							0
Pos	Rider	Bike	FRA (France)		ITA (Italy)		POR (Portugal)		POR (Portugal)		Points

== Youth ==
Team	Constructor	No	Rider	Rounds
TM Factory Racing Team	TM	304	(France) Nathan Bererd	1–2
Team Sherco Academy France	Sherco	305	(France) Thibault Giraudon	1
Team Sherco Academy France	Sherco	314	(France) Adrien Marchini	1
KTM Nimes by Race Moto	KTM	307	(France) Evan Raffard	1
	KTM	308	(Spain) Albert Fontova	3–4
Dafy Enduro Team	Husqvarna	309	(France) Arnaud Zoldos	1
RFME Junior Team	Husqvarna	311	(Spain) Alejandro Navarro	All
RFME Junior Team	Husqvarna	327	(Spain) Sergio Navarro	All
Fantic JET Racing	Fantic	316	(United Kingdom) Harry Edmondson	All
Fantic JET Racing	Fantic	394	(Italy) Riccardo Fabris	2–4
Bonneton2Roues Enduro Team	Yamaha	317	(France) Nathan Corny	1
	KTM	319	(Italy) Lorenzo Bernini	2
Atomic Moto	Beta	322	(France) Leo Joyon	1, 3
D'Arpa Racing Team	Fantic	328	(Finland) Hugo Svärd	All
D'Arpa Racing Team	Fantic	347	(United Kingdom) Jed Etchells	All
	Husqvarna	332	(Sweden) Kalle Körner Bjork	1–2
Beta Boano Costa Ligure	Beta	334	(Italy) Kevin Cristino	1–2
Beta Boano Costa Ligure	Beta	358	(Finland) Hermanni Haljala	All
Moto Palic	Beta	345	(Czech Republic) Matej Skuta	2
Beta Motor Poland	Beta	350	(Poland) Aleksander Bracik	2
GTG Motogamma	KTM	353	(Italy) Simone Cristini	2
ASD Entrophy Motorbike	Beta	355	(Italy) Lorenzo Giuliani	2
	KTM	359	(Spain) Francesc Aguilar	1, 3–4
Osellini Moto	Husqvarna	366	(Italy) Claudio Spanu	All
	KTM	369	(Italy) Matteo Grigis	2
FR Motosport	Beta	372	(Italy) Gabriele Pasinetti	2
	KTM	374	(Spain) Adria Mesas	1, 3–4
	KTM	381	(Netherlands) Mike Bokslag	All
KTM Racespec	KTM	390	(Portugal) Tomas Clemente	All
Tech 36 Racing Team	KTM	397	(Italy) Nicolo Paolucci	2

=== Riders Championship ===
Pos	Rider	Bike	FRA (France)		ITA (Italy)		POR (Portugal)		POR (Portugal)		Points
1	(Spain) Sergio Navarro	Husqvarna	2	2	2	2	2	2	1	4	135
2	(United Kingdom) Jed Etchells	Fantic	4	1	1	1	1	1	4	9	133
3	(Italy) Claudio Spanu	Husqvarna	1	3	3	5	3	3	2	1	128
4	(United Kingdom) Harry Edmondson	Fantic	3	4	5	3	4	4	5	2	108
5	(Finland) Hugo Svärd	Fantic	5	5	7	4	7	5	8	3	87
6	(Spain) Alejandro Navarro	Husqvarna	6	6	4	Ret	6	6	3	Ret	68
7	(Finland) Hermanni Haljala	Beta	8	7	6	10	5	7	6	DSQ	63
8	(Portugal) Tomas Clemente	KTM	11	10	8	7	8	9	7	5	63
9	(Spain) Albert Fontova	KTM					11	8	10	6	29
10	(France) Leo Joyon	Beta	7	8			9	11			29
11	(Spain) Francesc Aguilar	KTM	14	12			10	12	11	8	29
12	(Italy) Riccardo Fabris	KTM			10	14	Ret	10	9	Ret	21
13	(Netherlands) Mike Bokslag	KTM	17	13	Ret	16	12	Ret	12	7	20
14	(France) Nathan Bererd	TM	Ret	DNS	9	6					17
15	(Italy) Kevin Cristino	Beta	13	Ret	11	8					16
16	(France) Thibault Giraudon	Sherco	10	9							13
17	(France) Evan Raffard	KTM	9	11							12
18	(Italy) Gabriele Pasinetti	Beta			13	9					10
19	(Czech Republic) Matej Skuta	Beta			12	12					8
20	(Italy) Lorenzo Bernini	KTM			14	11					7
21	(Spain) Adria Mesas	KTM	12	Ret			Ret	DNS	13	Ret	7
22	(Italy) Simone Cristini	KTM			16	13					3
23	(France) Nathan Corny	Yamaha	16	14							2
24	(Sweden) Kalle Korner Bjork	Husqvarna	19	15	Ret	Ret					1
25	(France) Arnaud Zoldos	Husqvarna	15	Ret							1
26	(Poland) Aleksander Bracik	Beta			19	15					1
27	(Italy) Matteo Grigis	KTM			15	18					1
	(Italy) Lorenzo Giuliani	Beta			18	17					0
	(Italy) Nicolo Paolucci	KTM			17	Ret					0
	(France) Adrien Marchini	Sherco	18	Ret							0
Pos	Rider	Bike	FRA (France)		ITA (Italy)		POR (Portugal)		POR (Portugal)		Points

== Women ==
=== Calendar ===
Round	Event	Location	Dates
1	Portugal	Marco de Canaveses	13-14 November

=== Entry list ===
Team	Constructor	No	Rider
Off-Road Tryout	Rieju	4	(United Kingdom) Nieve Holmes
Honda Racing Brazil	Honda	10	(Brazil) Barbara Neves
RFME Women's Team	Husqvarna	11	(Spain) Sandra Gomez
RFME Women's Team	Husqvarna	32	(Spain) Mireia Badia
RFME Women's Team	Husqvarna	33	(Spain) Aida Castro
Team Bianchi Prata	Honda	13	(Brazil) Janaina Souza
JET Zanardo	Fantic	14	(Chile) Tania Gonzalez
Eurotek KTM	KTM	16	(United Kingdom) Rosie Rowett
Risk Racing Team Scandinavia	Husqvarna	22	(Norway) Vilde Holt
Raposeira Yamaha	Yamaha	61	(Portugal) Rita Vieira
Team Racespec	KTM	67	(Portugal) Bruna Antunes
Jetmar Husqvarna	Husqvarna	76	(Portugal) Joana Gonçalves
Elite Moto 15 Enduro Team	KTM	95	(France) Justine Martel
SBMX	Husqvarna	96	(United Kingdom) Jane Daniels

=== Riders Championship ===
Pos	Rider	Bike	POR (Portugal)		Points
1	(United Kingdom) Jane Daniels	Husqvarna	1	1	40
2	(Spain) Mireia Badia	Husqvarna	3	2	32
3	(France) Justine Martel	KTM	2	5	28
4	(Spain) Sandra Gomez	Husqvarna	4	3	28
5	(Portugal) Joana Gonçalves	Husqvarna	6	4	23
6	(United Kingdom) Nieve Holmes	Rieju	5	8	19
7	(United Kingdom) Rosie Rowett	KTM	7	6	19
8	(Portugal) Rita Vieira	Yamaha	9	7	16
9	(Norway) Vilde Holt	Husqvarna	8	12	12
10	(Brazil) Janaina Souza	Honda	11	9	12
11	(Brazil) Barbara Neves	Honda	10	11	11
12	(Portugal) Bruna Antunes	KTM	12	10	10
13	(Spain) Aida Castro	Husqvarna	13	Ret	3
14	(Chile) Tania Gonzalez	Fantic	14	Ret	2
Pos	Rider	Bike	POR (Portugal)		Points

== Open World Cup ==
=== Open 2-Stroke ===
Team	Constructor	No	Rider	Rounds
Echt Gold Team Prichovice	KTM	503	(Czech Republic) Robert Friedrich	All
SBXtreme ET James KTM	KTM	504	(United Kingdom) Samuel Davies	All
Moto Espinha	Beta	505	(Portugal) Gonçalo Sobrosa	All
Moto Espinha	Beta	519	(Portugal) Ricardo Wilson	All
ASD Entrophy Motorbike	Beta	506	(Italy) Filippo Grimani	3–4
Team Beluga Enduro	Yamaha	508	(Italy) Roberto Gatti	2
Sherco Academy France	Sherco	509	(France) Loris Gubian	1
Bomcar Husqvarna	Husqvarna	511	(Portugal) Frederico Rocha	All
JET Zanardo	Fantic	514	(Chile) Tania Gonzalez	3
Cais Motor	KTM	517	(Portugal) Gonçalo Reis	All
Johansson MPE	Yamaha	565	(Sweden) Arvid Modin	2–4
WP Eric Augé Team	KTM	570	(Spain) Marti Escofet	1, 3–4
	Beta	584	(Italy) Luca Pavone	2
Poland Enduro Team	Beta	596	(Poland) Rafal Bracik	2
KTM Belgium Youth Team	KTM	599	(Belgium) Dorian Tourneur	1

=== Riders Championship ===
Pos	Rider	Bike	FRA (France)		ITA (Italy)		POR (Portugal)		POR (Portugal)		Points
1	(Portugal) Gonçalo Reis	KTM	1	1	1	1	1	1	1	1	120
2	(Portugal) Gonçalo Sobrosa	Beta	5	5	2	2	2	3	3	4	94
3	(Czech Republic) Robert Friedrich	KTM	4	2	3	3	3	4	6	3	90
4	(Sweden) Arvid Modin	Yamaha			6	5	4	2	2	2	85
5	(United Kingdom) Samuel Davies	KTM	2	4	4	4	Ret	6	5	7	77
6	(Portugal) Ricardo Wilson	Beta	6	6	7	7	7	7	7	6	57
7	(Portugal) Frederico Rocha	Husqvarna	7	9	8	9	8	9	8	8	48
8	(Spain) Marti Escofet	KTM	9	8			6	8	9	9	47
9	(Italy) Filippo Grimani	Beta					5	5	4	5	46
10	(France) Loris Gubian	Sherco	3	3							30
11	(Poland) Rafal Bracik	Beta			5	6					21
12	(Belgium) Dorian Tourneur	KTM	8	7							17
13	(Italy) Roberto Gatti	Yamaha			9	8					15
	(Chile) Tania Gonzalez	Fantic					Ret	Ret			0
Pos	Rider	Bike	FRA (France)		ITA (Italy)		POR (Portugal)		POR (Portugal)		Points

=== Open 4-Stroke ===
Team	Constructor	No	Rider	Rounds
	Husqvarna	601	(Spain) Albert Casas	1
AJP Motos	AJP	601	(Portugal) Paulo Felicia	3–4
Sluse Motos	Husqvarna	604	(Belgium) Kevin Thomas	1
Husqvarna Belgium	Husqvarna	612	(Belgium) Mathias Van Hoof	All
Husqvarna Belgium	Husqvarna	623	(Belgium) Mika Vanderheyden	All
Aleser	Husqvarna	617	(Spain) Francisco Jose Garcia	1
	Husqvarna	619	(Portugal) Filipe Oliveira	All
Engine59 Vukcevic Racing	Sherco	620	(Belgium) Tanguy Gabriel	4
WP Eric Augé Team	KTM	622	(Chile) Matteo de Gavardo	All
Enduro Attitude Racing Team	Husqvarna	627	(Belgium) Martin Valenduc	1
Enduro Attitude Racing Team	KTM	674	(Belgium) Quentin Vinken	1
Motorgas Racing Team	Husqvarna	632	(Spain) Mireia Badia	1, 3
	Honda	634	(Italy) Emanuele Cometta	2
Team LM Sens	Husqvarna	637	(France) Corentin Lestrade	4
Team LM Sens	Husqvarna	638	(France) Vincent Couailler	3–4
Team LM Sens	Husqvarna	639	(France) Benjamin Simonot	3–4
Johansson MPE	Yamaha	643	(Sweden) Nisse Gustavsson	3–4
DAM Racing	KTM	654	(Belgium) Ludovic Bral	1–2
DAM Racing	KTM	664	(Belgium) Dietger Damiaens	All
	Yamaha	655	(Belgium) Florian Tichoux	1
Nuñez Motor	Husqvarna	669	(Spain) Jorge Paradelo	All
	KTM	681	(Italy) Andrea Belotti	All
	Honda	683	(Spain) Benet Gomez	1–2
	Yamaha	695	(France) Elie Le Dez	1
	Husqvarna	695	(Spain) Abel Carballes	3–4

=== Riders Championship ===
Pos	Rider	Bike	FRA (France)		ITA (Italy)		POR (Portugal)		POR (Portugal)		Points
1	(Belgium) Dietger Damiaens	KTM	1	1	2	2	2	1	2	1	114
2	(Belgium) Mathias Van Hoof	Husqvarna	2	2	1	1	1	2	1	2	114
3	(Spain) Jorge Paradelo	Husqvarna	6	4	3	3	3	3	3	4	88
4	(Italy) Andrea Belotti	KTM	5	5	4	5	6	6	4	5	70
5	(Spain) Benet Gomez	Honda	3	3	5	4					54
6	(Chile) Matteo De Gavardo	KTM	8	8	7	6	8	7	10	6	54
7	(Portugal) Filipe Oliveira	Husqvarna	10	7	6	8	Ret	DNS	8	8	49
8	(Belgium) Mika Vanderheyden	Husqvarna	9	10	9	9	7	8	11	7	47
9	(Spain) Abel Carballes	Husqvarna					4	4	5	Ret	37
10	(Belgium) Ludovic Bral	KTM	7	9	8	7					33
11	(Portugal) Paulo Felicia	AJP					5	5	7	Ret	31
12	(Belgium) Tanguy Gabriel	Sherco							6	3	25
13	(Sweden) Nisse Gustavsson	Yamaha					12	9	9	9	25
14	(France) Elie Le Dez	Yamaha	4	6							23
15	(France) Vincent Couailler	Husqvarna					10	11	14	11	18
16	(Spain) Mireia Badia	Husqvarna	14	12			11	10			17
17	(France) Benjamin Simonot	Husqvarna					9	Ret	13	12	14
18	(Italy) Emanuele Cometta	Honda			10	10					12
19	(France) Corentin Lestrade	Husqvarna							12	10	10
20	(Spain) Francisco Jose Garcia	Husqvarna	15	11							6
21	(Belgium) Kevin Thomas	Husqvarna	11	Ret							5
22	(Belgium) Florian Tichoux	Yamaha	12	Ret							4
23	(Spain) Albert Casas	Husqvarna	13	Ret							3
	(Belgium) Quentin Vinken	KTM	DSQ	Ret							0
	(Belgium) Martin Valenduc	Husqvarna	Ret	DNS							0
Pos	Rider	Bike	FRA (France)		ITA (Italy)		POR (Portugal)		POR (Portugal)		Points
