= Calmont =

Calmont may refer to:

- Several communes in France:
  - Calmont, Aveyron, in the Aveyron department
  - Calmont, Haute-Garonne, in the Haute-Garonne department
- Calmont (hill), a 380m high hill on the Moselle in Germany
