= Auriac-Lagast =

Commune in Occitanie, France

- Commune
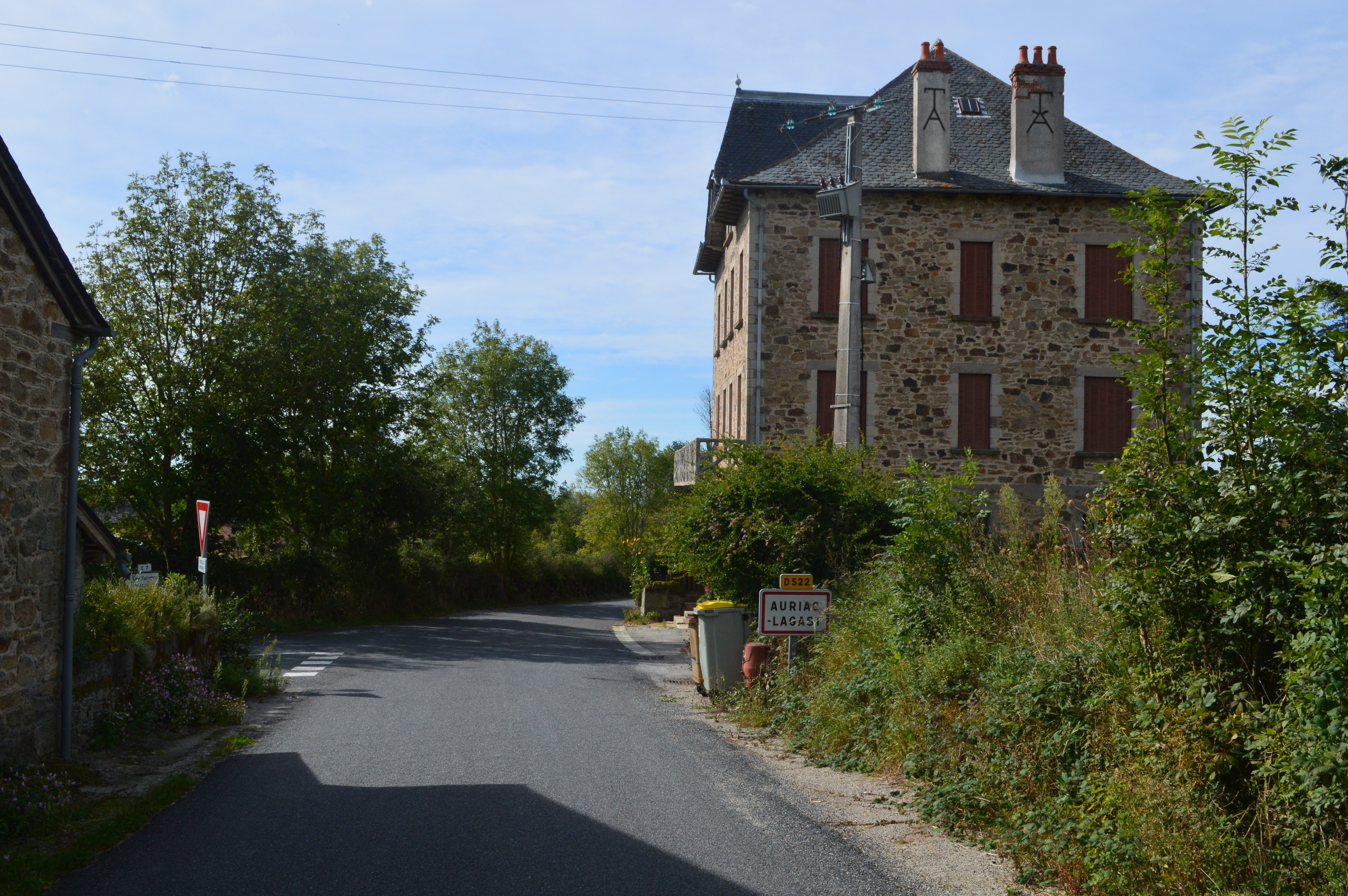
- The road into Auriac-Lagast
- Location of Auriac-Lagast
- Location within France Location within Occitanie
- Coordinates: 44°08′50″N 2°34′52″E
- Country: France
- Region: Occitania
- Department: Aveyron
- Arrondissement: Millau
- Canton: Monts du Réquistanais
- Intercommunality: CC Réquistanais

Government
  - Mayor (2020–2026): Yves Latieule
- Area^{1}: 30.76 km^{2} (11.88 sq mi)
- Elevation: 680 m (2,230 ft)
- Highest elevation: 930 m (3,050 ft)
- Lowest elevation: 574 m (1,883 ft)
- Population (2023): 228
  - Density: 7.41/km^{2} (19.2/sq mi)
- Time zone: UTC+01:00 (CET)
  - Summer (DST): UTC+02:00 (CEST)
- INSEE/Postal code: 12015 /12120
- ^{1} French Land Register data, which excludes lakes, ponds, glaciers > 1 km^{2} (0.386 sq mi or 247 acres) and river estuaries.

Auriac-Lagast is a commune in the Aveyron department in the Occitanie region of southern France.

== Geography ==
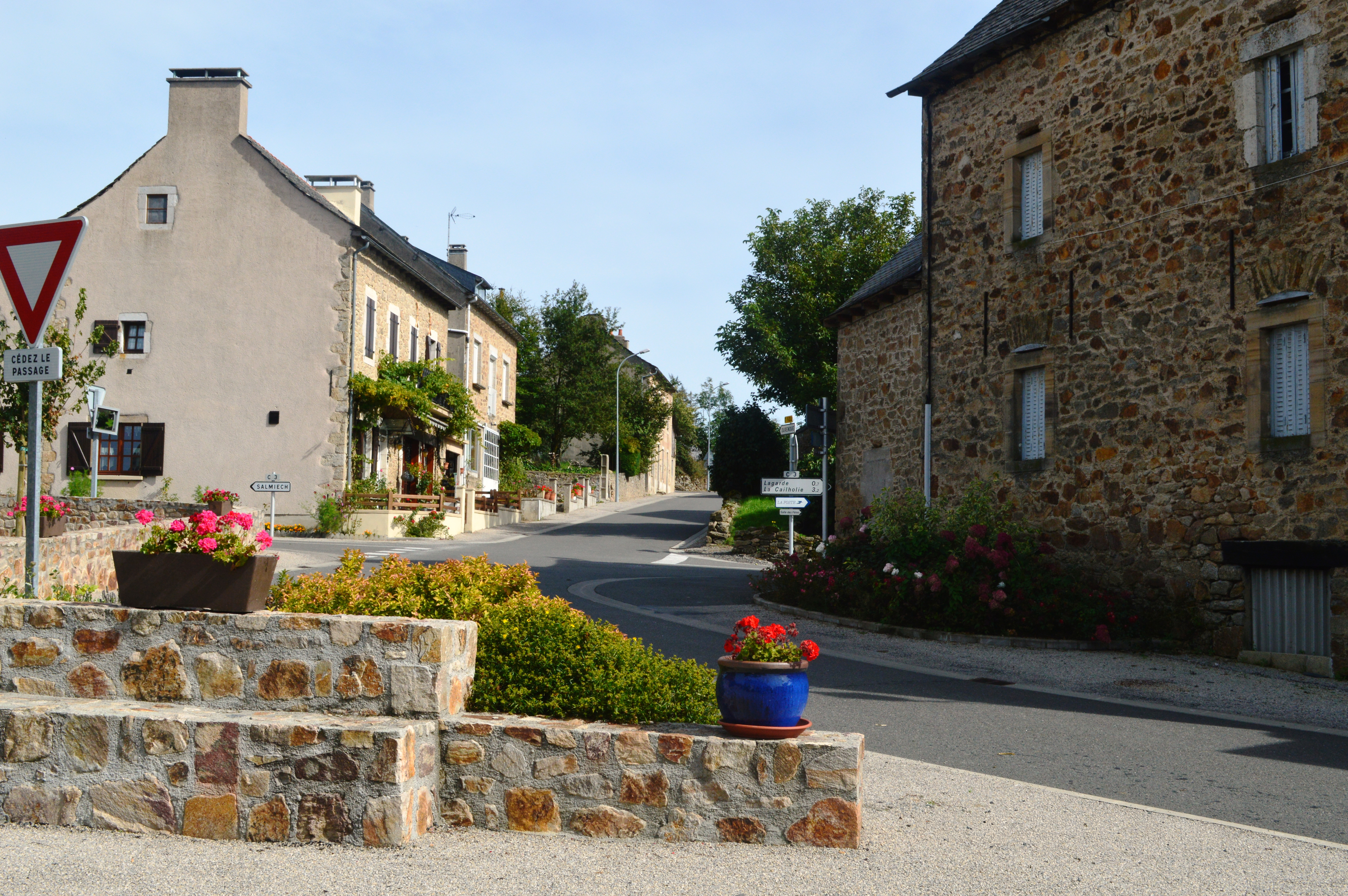
A street in Auriac-Lagast

Auriac-Lagast is located some 27 km south of Rodez and 35 km north by north-east of Carmaux. Access to the commune is by the D522 road from Cassagnes-Bégonhès in the north-west, which passes through the heart of the commune and the village and continues south-east to Durenque. The D25 passes inside the eastern border of the commune as it goes from Salmiech to Villefranche-de-Panat. Apart from the village, there are the hamlets of:

- Belle Sagne,
- Belvezet,
- La Cailholie,
- Castanies,
- La Garde,
- Ginestous,
- La Malborie,
- Moncan,
- Saint-Leon,
- Le Roube,
- La Roque,
- Randan,
- Les Salettes,

The commune is almost entirely farmland with a few forests.

The Gladou river rises in the east of the commune and flows west, forming part of the western border as it then flows north to join the Céar south of Cassagnes-Bégonhès. The Hunargues and the Ruisseau des Gazelles also rise in the commune and flow west to join the Gladou in the commune. The Ruisseau du Lagast rises in the south-eastern corner of the commune and forms most of the eastern border as it flows north to join the Céor. The Ruisseau de Miège Sole crosses the eastern arm of the commune and forms part of the northern border of the arm before continuing north to join the Ruisseau du Lagast just north of the commune.

== Administration ==
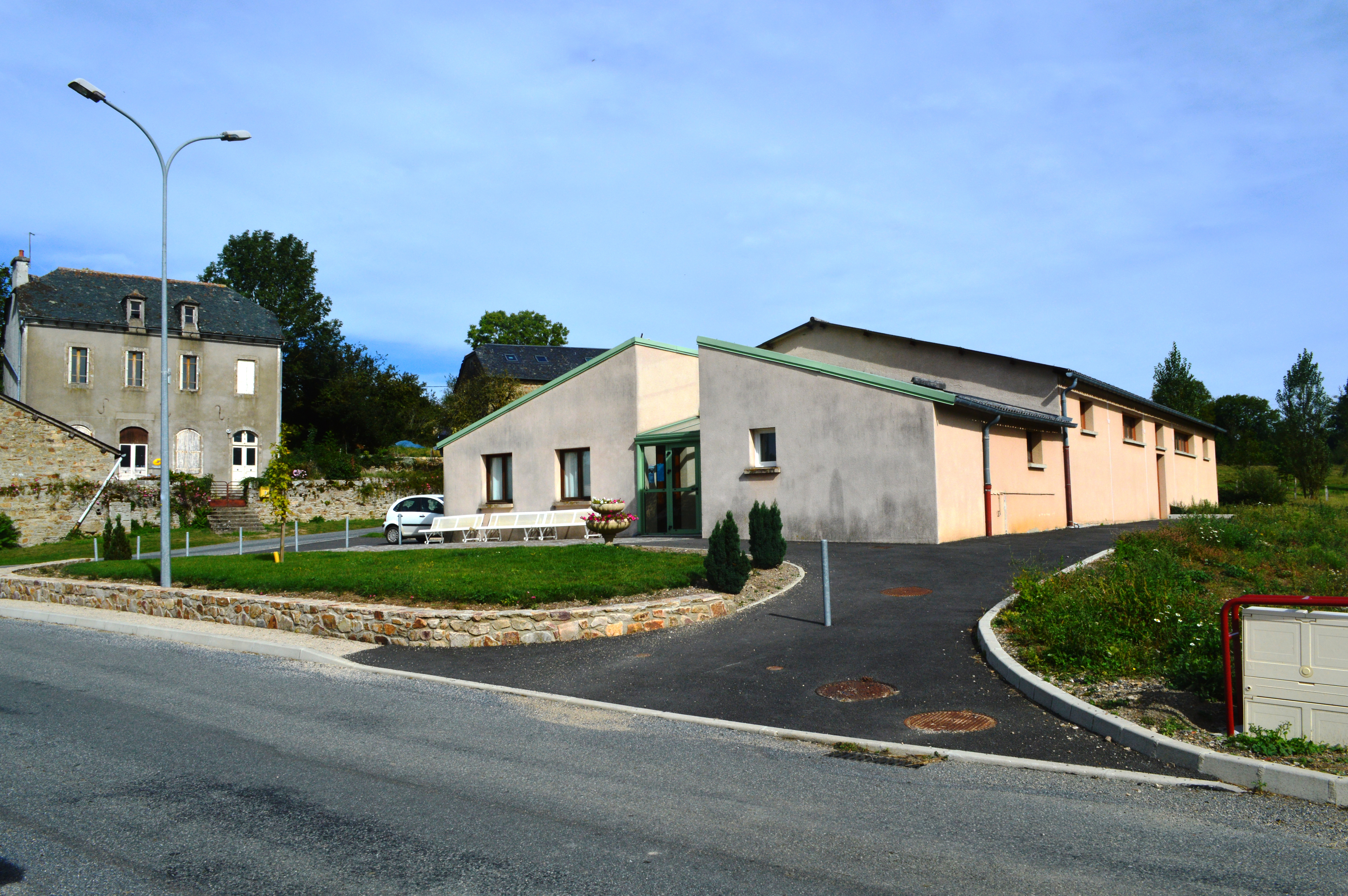
Auriac-Lagast Community Hall

List of Successive Mayors

From	To	Name
1833	1837	Etienne Moudon
1837	1838	Adolphe Bonnefous
1838	1848	Hercule Bonnefous
1848	1853	Marie Henri Régis Bonnefous
1853	1865	Raymond Seguret
1865	1883	Henri Urbain Molnier
2001	2008	Yves Letieule
2008	2014	Jean Garrigues
2014	2026	Yves Latieule

== Demography ==
The inhabitants of the commune are known as Aurigastois or Aurigastoises in French.

Historical population

Year	Pop.	±% p.a.
1793	422	—
1836	533	+0.54%
1851	552	+0.23%
1872	616	+0.52%
1901	615	−0.01%
1926	593	−0.15%
1946	652	+0.48%
1954	558	−1.93%
1962	524	−0.78%

Year	Pop.	±% p.a.
1968	524	+0.00%
1975	425	−2.95%
1982	385	−1.40%
1990	315	−2.48%
1999	280	−1.30%
2007	262	−0.83%
2012	234	−2.24%
2017	229	−0.43%
2023	228	−0.07%

Source: EHESS and INSEE

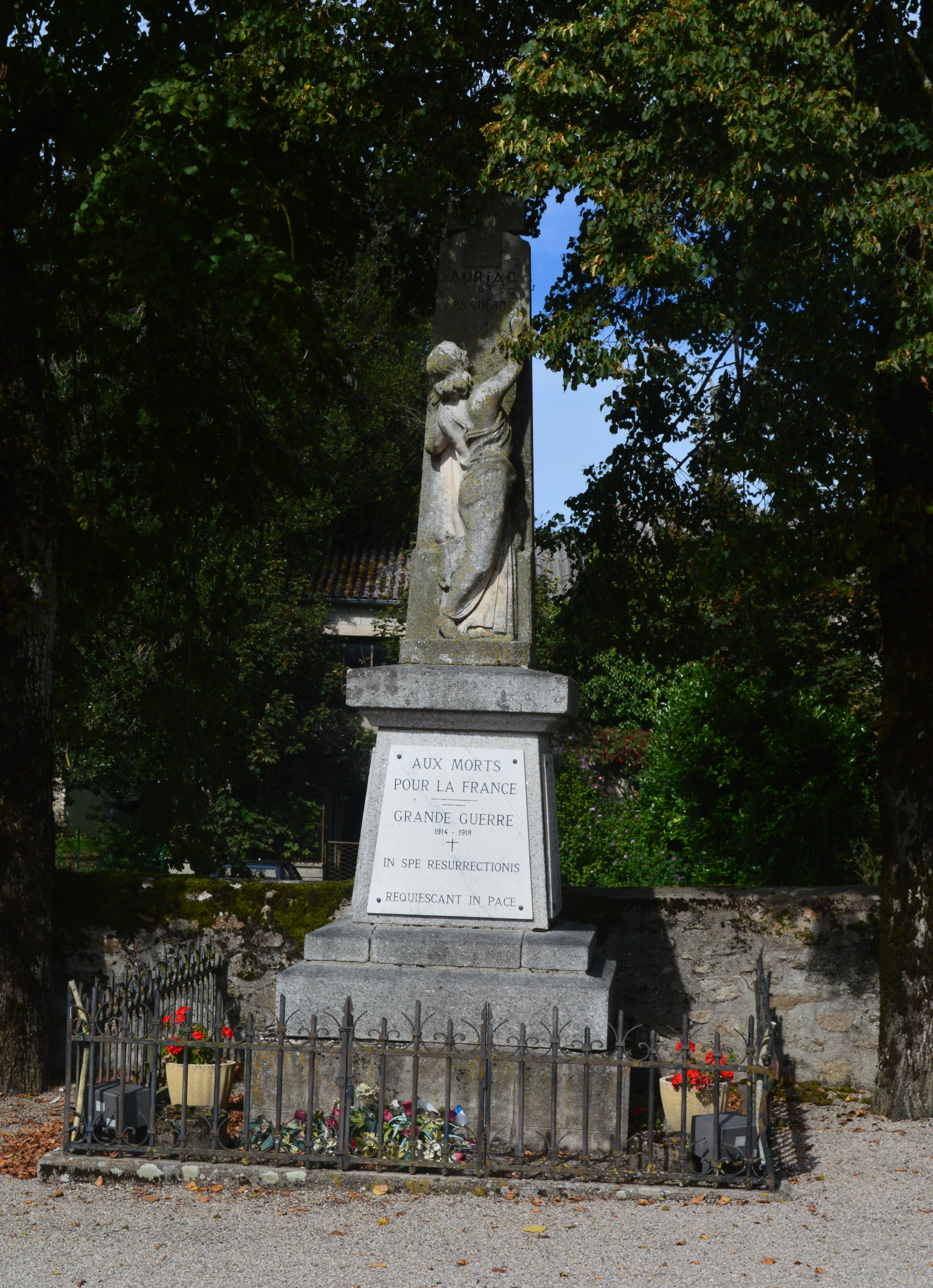
Auriac-Lagast War Memorial

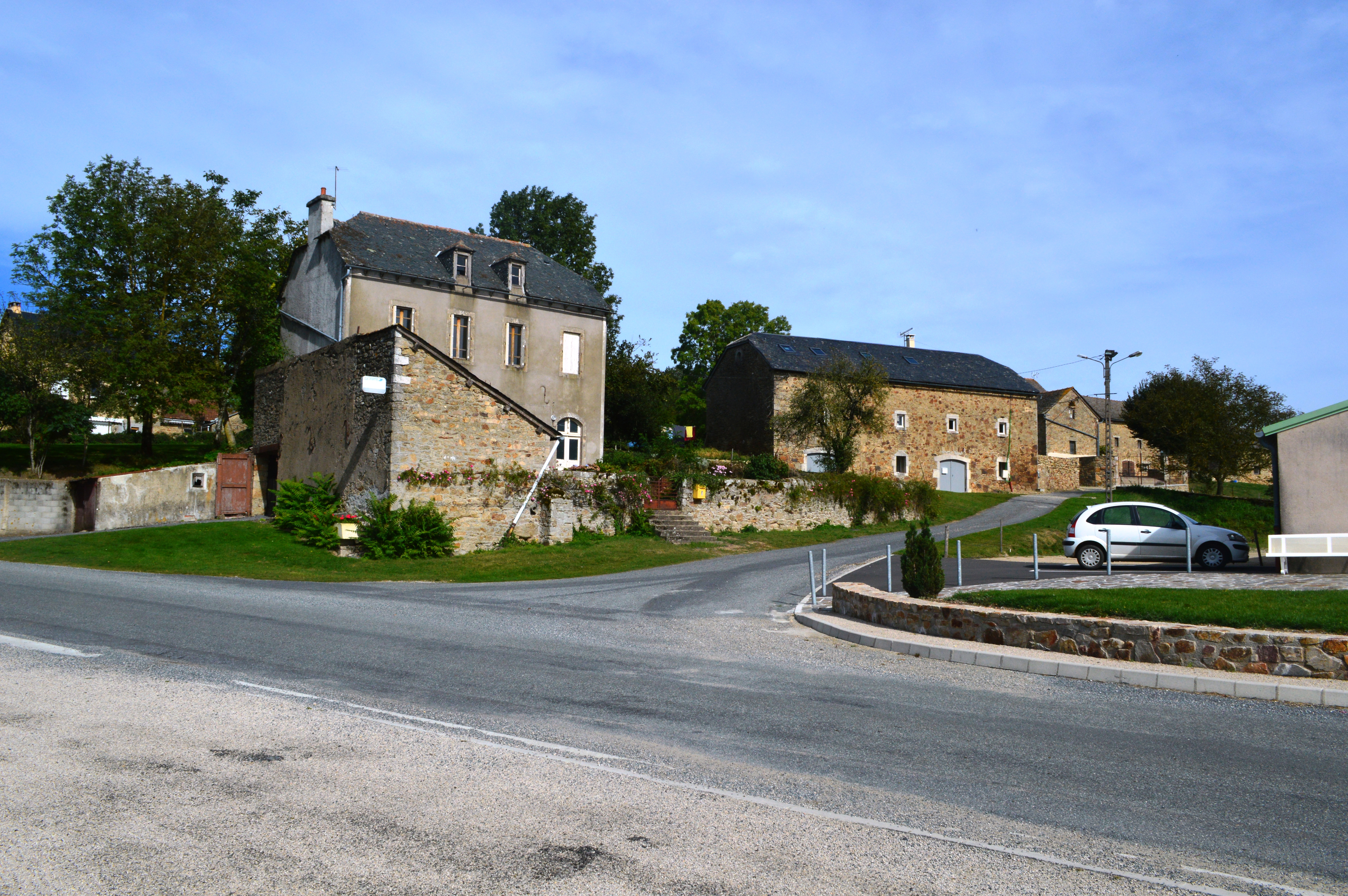
Auriac-Lagast General View

== Sites and monuments ==
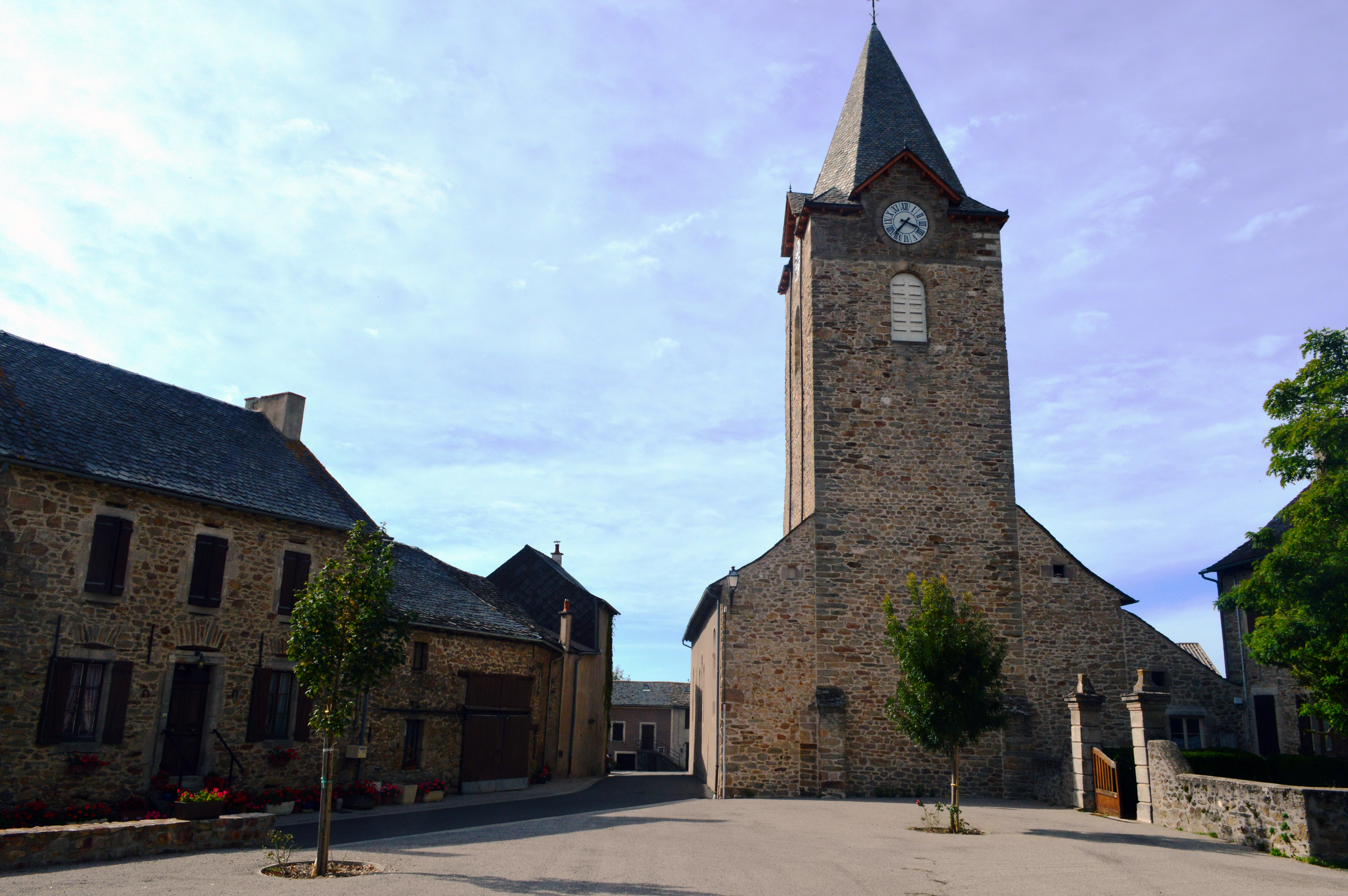
The Church of Saint-Léonard of Auriac

- The Parish Church of Saint-Léonard of Auriac: its steeple was struck by lightning and restored.
- Moncan (private area)
- The Chateau of Randan (private property - owned by the family of Raymond Bonnefous)

== See also ==
- Communes of the Aveyron department

=== Bibliography ===
- Christian-Pierre Bedel, preface by Bernard Destours, Cassanhas, Arviu, Auriac, Caumont, La Grand'Vila, Saumièg, Senta-Jaleda / Christian-Pierre Bedel e los estatjants del canton de Cassanhas, Rodez, Mission départementale de la culture, 1996, Al canton collection, 240 pages, ill., cov. ill., 28 cm, ISBN 2-907279-30-0, ISSN 1151-8375, BnF 366930046 (in Occitan and French)
