= La Selve =

La Selve may refer to the following places in France:

- La Selve, Aisne, a commune in the department of Aisne
- La Selve, Aveyron, a commune in the department of Aveyron
