= Penafiel (parish) =

- Civil parish
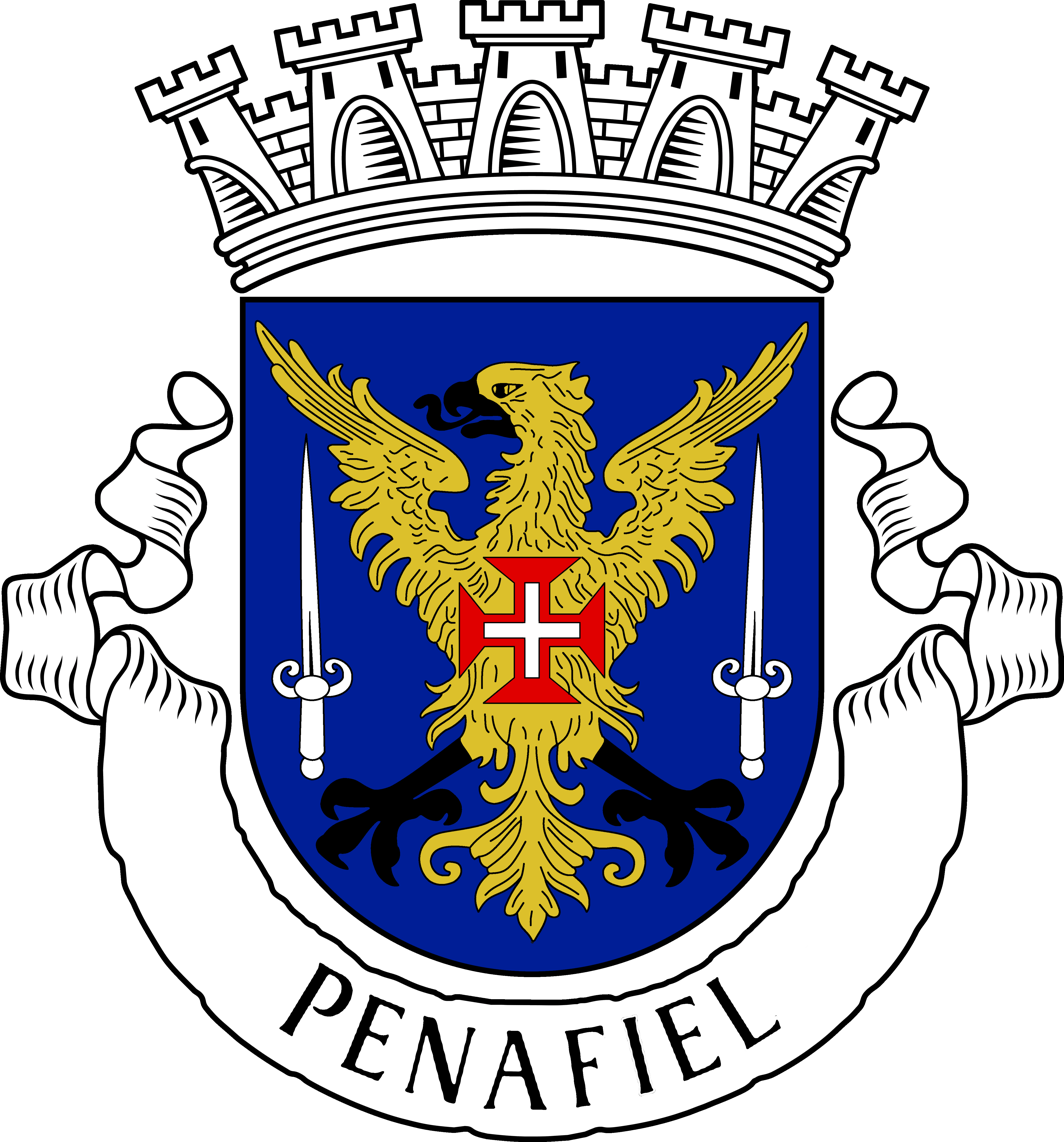
- Coat of arms

- Location in Portugal
- Coordinates: 41.206°N 8.284°W
- Country: Portugal
- Region: Norte
- Intermunic. comm.: Tâmega e Sousa
- District: Porto
- Municipality: Penafiel

Area
  - Total: 22.52 km^{2} (8.70 sq mi)

Population (2011)
  - Total: 15,552
  - Density: 690.6/km^{2} (1,789/sq mi)
- Time zone: UTC+00:00 (WET)
  - Summer (DST): UTC+01:00 (WEST)

Penafiel is a town and a parish in Penafiel Municipality in Portugal. The population in 2011 was 15,552, in an area of 22.52 km^{2}. Penafiel has its own station on the Douro railway line.

== Industry ==
AJP Motos, a motorcycle manufacturing company founded in 1987 by António Pinto and Jorge Pinto, is based in Penafiel.
