= Château de Calmont =

Ruined castle in Occitania, France

Coordinates: 43°17′12″N 1°37′57″E

The Château de Calmont is a ruined 14th century castle in the commune of Calmont in the Haute-Garonne département of France.

The property of the commune, it has been listed since 1927 as a monument historique by the French Ministry of Culture.

== See also ==
- List of castles in France
