= Canton of Monts du Réquistanais =

Coordinates: 44.03°N 2.54°E

- Canton
- Situation of the canton of Monts du Réquistanais in the department of Aveyron
- Country: France
- Region: Occitania
- Department: Aveyron
- No. of communes: {{{nbcomm}}}
- Population (2023): 10,692
- INSEE code: 1213

The canton of Monts du Réquistanais is an administrative division of the Aveyron department, southern France. It was created at the French canton reorganisation which came into effect in March 2015. Its seat is in Réquista.

It consists of the following communes:

- Arvieu
- Auriac-Lagast
- Calmont
- Cassagnes-Bégonhès
- Comps-la-Grand-Ville
- Connac
- Durenque
- Lédergues
- Réquista
- Rullac-Saint-Cirq
- Sainte-Juliette-sur-Viaur
- Saint-Jean-Delnous
- Salmiech
- La Selve
