= Lédergues =

Commune in Occitanie, France

- Commune
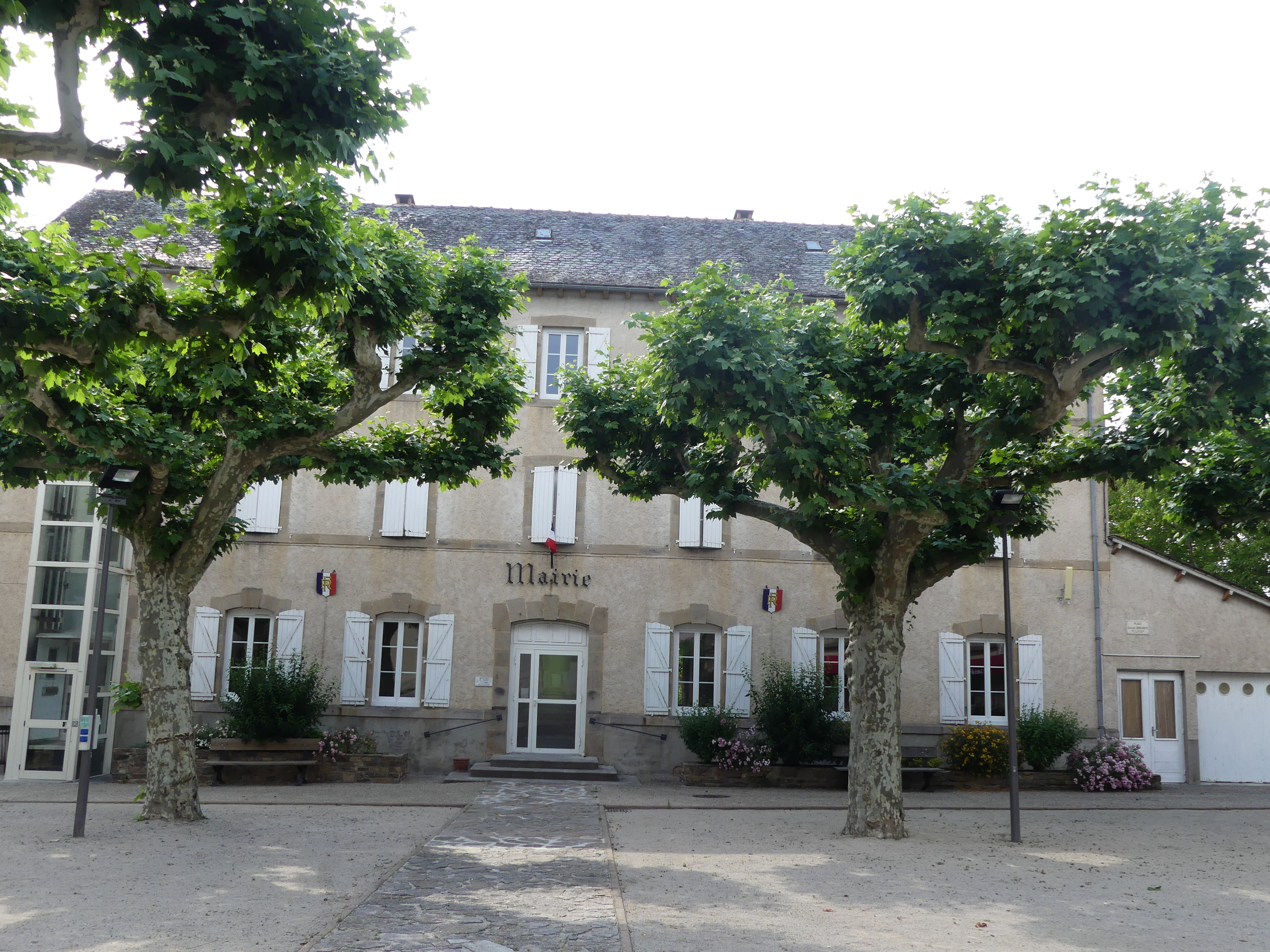
- Lédergues Town hall

- Coat of arms
- Location of Lédergues
- Location within France Location within Occitanie
- Coordinates: 44°05′23″N 2°26′30″E
- Country: France
- Region: Occitania
- Department: Aveyron
- Arrondissement: Millau
- Canton: Monts du Réquistanais
- Intercommunality: Réquistanais

Government
  - Mayor (2020–2026): Patrice Panis (UDI)
- Area^{1}: 36.31 km^{2} (14.02 sq mi)
- Elevation: 450 m (1,480 ft)
- Highest elevation: 544 m (1,785 ft)
- Lowest elevation: 331 m (1,086 ft)
- Population (2023): 677
  - Density: 18.6/km^{2} (48.3/sq mi)
- Time zone: UTC+01:00 (CET)
  - Summer (DST): UTC+02:00 (CEST)
- INSEE/Postal code: 12127 /12170
- ^{1} French Land Register data, which excludes lakes, ponds, glaciers > 1 km^{2} (0.386 sq mi or 247 acres) and river estuaries.

Lédergues (French pronunciation: [ledɛʁɡ]; Occitan: Ledèrgas) is a commune in the Aveyron department in southern France.

== Geography ==
The commune is traversed by the Cérou river.

== Population ==
Historical population
Year	Pop.	±% p.a.
1968	1,049	—
1975	960	−1.26%
1982	862	−1.53%
1990	746	−1.79%
1999	683	−0.98%
2007	701	+0.33%
2012	704	+0.09%
2017	644	−1.77%
2023	677	+0.84%
Source: INSEE

== See also ==
- Communes of the Aveyron department
