= Comps-la-Grand-Ville =

Commune in Occitanie, France

- Commune
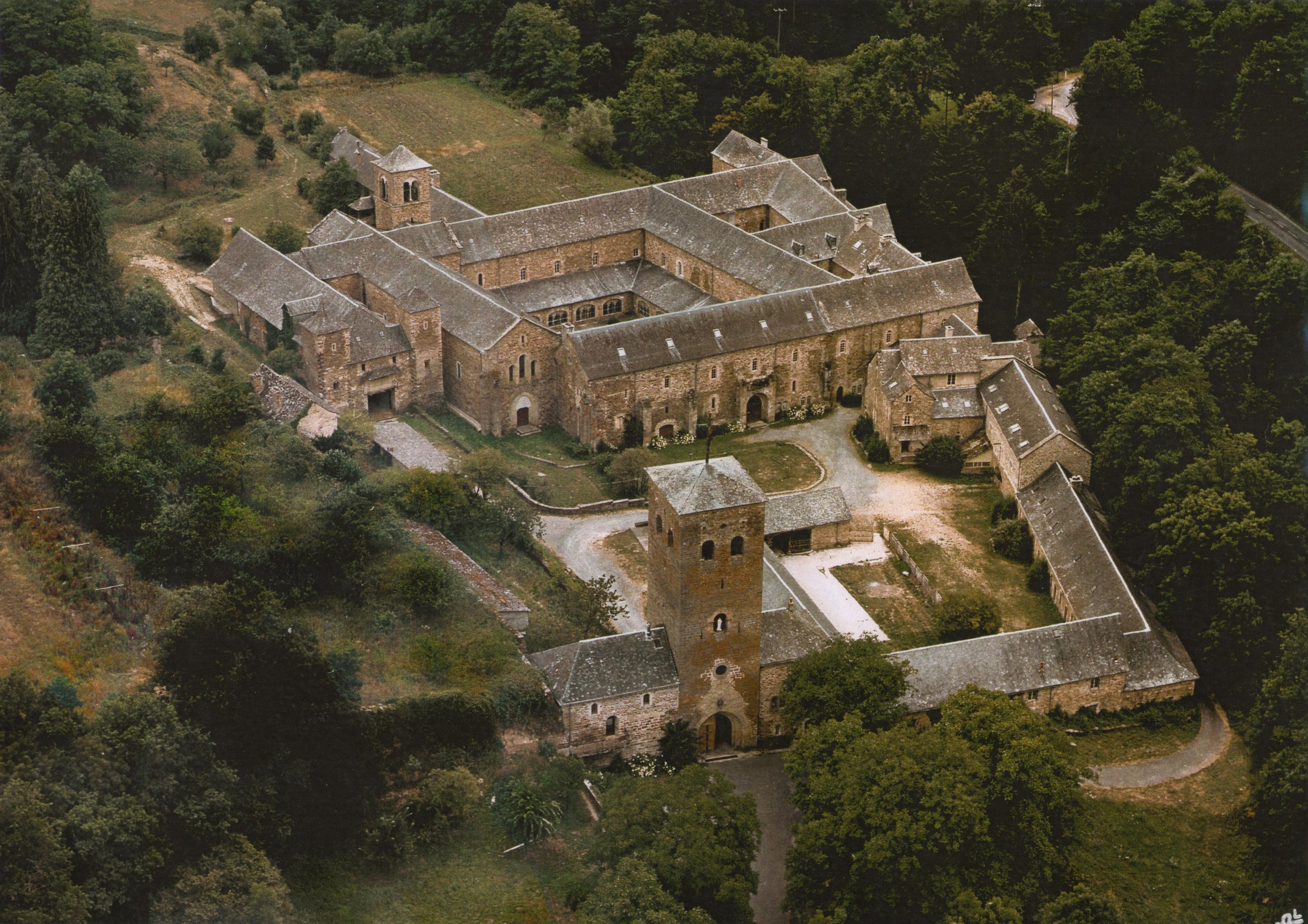
- Bonnecombe Abbey
- Location of Comps-la-Grand-Ville
- Location within France Location within Occitanie
- Coordinates: 44°13′53″N 2°34′05″E
- Country: France
- Region: Occitania
- Department: Aveyron
- Arrondissement: Millau
- Canton: Monts du Réquistanais
- Intercommunality: Pays de Salars

Government
  - Mayor (2020–2026): Nicolas Massol
- Area^{1}: 21.95 km^{2} (8.47 sq mi)
- Elevation: 705 m (2,313 ft)
- Highest elevation: 772 m (2,533 ft)
- Lowest elevation: 441 m (1,447 ft)
- Population (2023): 636
  - Density: 29.0/km^{2} (75.0/sq mi)
- Time zone: UTC+01:00 (CET)
  - Summer (DST): UTC+02:00 (CEST)
- INSEE/Postal code: 12073 /12120
- ^{1} French Land Register data, which excludes lakes, ponds, glaciers > 1 km^{2} (0.386 sq mi or 247 acres) and river estuaries.

Comps-la-Grand-Ville is a commune in the Aveyron department in southern France.

== Population ==
Historical population
Year	Pop.	±% p.a.
1968	581	—
1975	576	−0.12%
1982	542	−0.87%
1990	516	−0.61%
1999	426	−2.11%
2007	499	+2.00%
2012	563	+2.44%
2017	624	+2.08%
2023	636	+0.32%
Source: INSEE

== See also ==
- Communes of the Aveyron department
