= Connac =

Commune in Occitanie, France

- Commune
- Coat of arms
- Location of Connac
- Location within France Location within Occitanie
- Coordinates: 44°01′15″N 2°36′09″E
- Country: France
- Region: Occitania
- Department: Aveyron
- Arrondissement: Millau
- Canton: Monts du Réquistanais
- Intercommunality: Réquistanais

Government
  - Mayor (2020–2026): Georges Bousquet
- Area^{1}: 10.69 km^{2} (4.13 sq mi)
- Elevation: 467 m (1,532 ft)
- Highest elevation: 662 m (2,172 ft)
- Lowest elevation: 224 m (735 ft)
- Population (2023): 99
  - Density: 9.3/km^{2} (24/sq mi)
- Time zone: UTC+01:00 (CET)
  - Summer (DST): UTC+02:00 (CEST)
- INSEE/Postal code: 12075 /12170
- ^{1} French Land Register data, which excludes lakes, ponds, glaciers > 1 km^{2} (0.386 sq mi or 247 acres) and river estuaries.

Connac (French pronunciation: [kɔnak]; Occitan: Colnac) is a commune in the Aveyron department in southern France.

== Population ==
Historical population
Year	Pop.	±% p.a.
1968	196	—
1975	145	−4.21%
1982	148	+0.29%
1990	106	−4.09%
1999	122	+1.57%
2007	115	−0.74%
2012	112	−0.53%
2017	109	−0.54%
2023	99	−1.59%
Source: INSEE

== See also ==
- Communes of the Aveyron department
