= Sainte-Juliette-sur-Viaur =

Commune in Occitanie, France

- Commune
- Location of Sainte-Juliette-sur-Viaur
- Location within France Location within Occitanie
- Coordinates: 44°12′55″N 2°31′20″E
- Country: France
- Region: Occitania
- Department: Aveyron
- Arrondissement: Villefranche-de-Rouergue
- Canton: Monts du Réquistanais

Government
  - Mayor (2020–2026): Simon Worou
- Area^{1}: 16.71 km^{2} (6.45 sq mi)
- Elevation: 602 m (1,975 ft)
- Highest elevation: 650 m (2,130 ft)
- Lowest elevation: 394 m (1,293 ft)
- Population (2023): 645
  - Density: 38.6/km^{2} (100/sq mi)
- Time zone: UTC+01:00 (CET)
  - Summer (DST): UTC+02:00 (CEST)
- INSEE/Postal code: 12234 /12120
- ^{1} French Land Register data, which excludes lakes, ponds, glaciers > 1 km^{2} (0.386 sq mi or 247 acres) and river estuaries.

Sainte-Juliette-sur-Viaur (French pronunciation: [sɛ̃t ʒyljɛt syʁ vjɔʁ], literally Sainte-Juliette on Viaur; Occitan: Senta Jaleda) is a commune in the Aveyron department in southern France.

== Population ==
Historical population
Year	Pop.	±% p.a.
1968	468	—
1975	455	−0.40%
1982	456	+0.03%
1990	409	−1.35%
1999	441	+0.84%
2007	500	+1.58%
2012	555	+2.11%
2017	598	+1.50%
2023	645	+1.27%
Source: INSEE

== See also ==
- Communes of the Aveyron department
