= AJP Motos =

Portuguese manufacturer

- Industry: Motorcycle
- Founded: 17 August 1987
- Founder: Antonio Pinto & Jorge Pinto
- Headquarters: Penafiel, Portugal
- Website: ajpmotos.com

AJP Motos is a Portuguese manufacturer of enduro and off-road motorcycles producing single-cylinder.

AJP Motos was founded in 1987 by brothers António Pinto and Jorge Pinto' in Penafiel, northern Portugal. Beginning as a workshop preparing off-road motorcycles, the company later diversified into manufacturing complete bikes.

== History ==
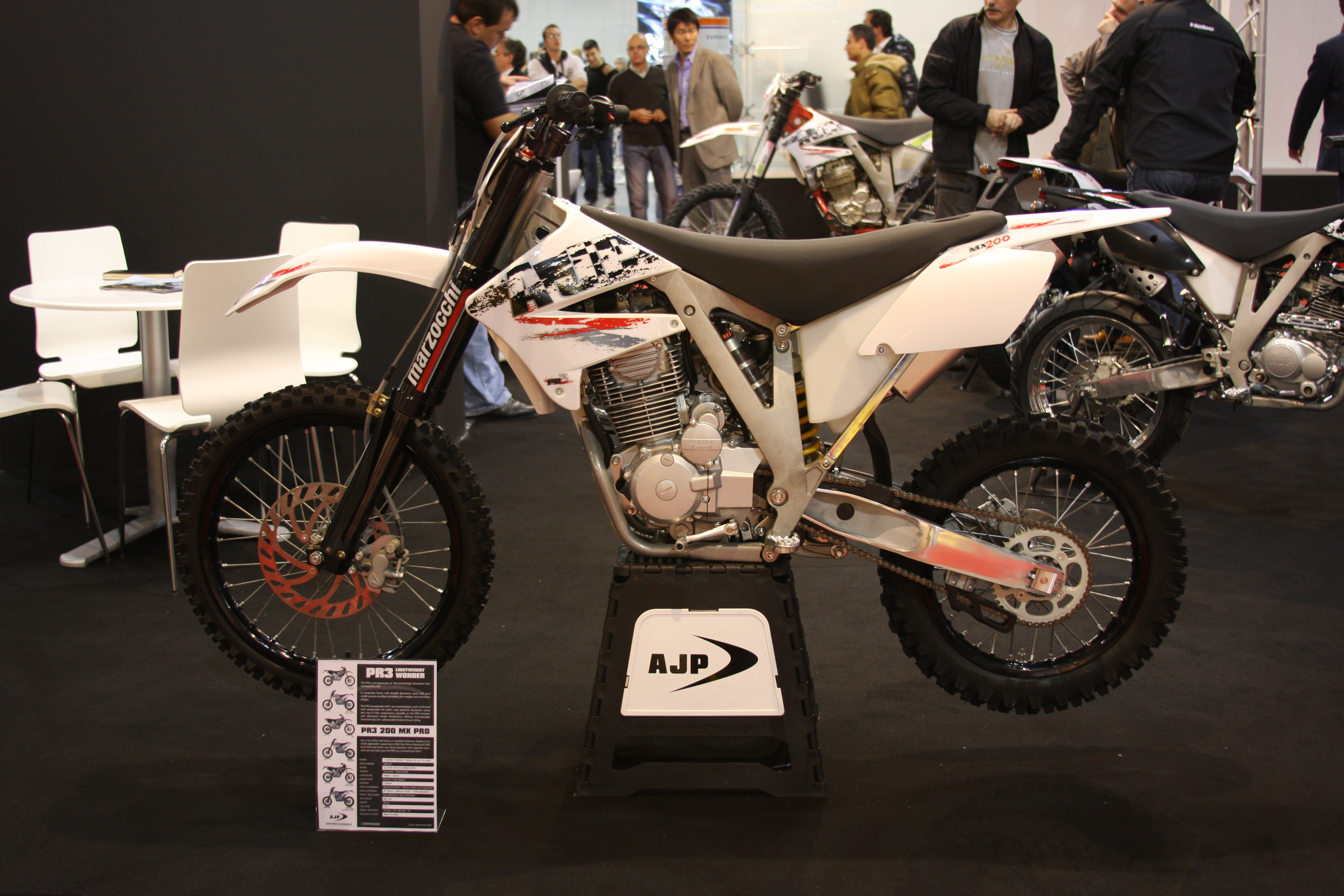
2010 AJP PR3 200cc MX

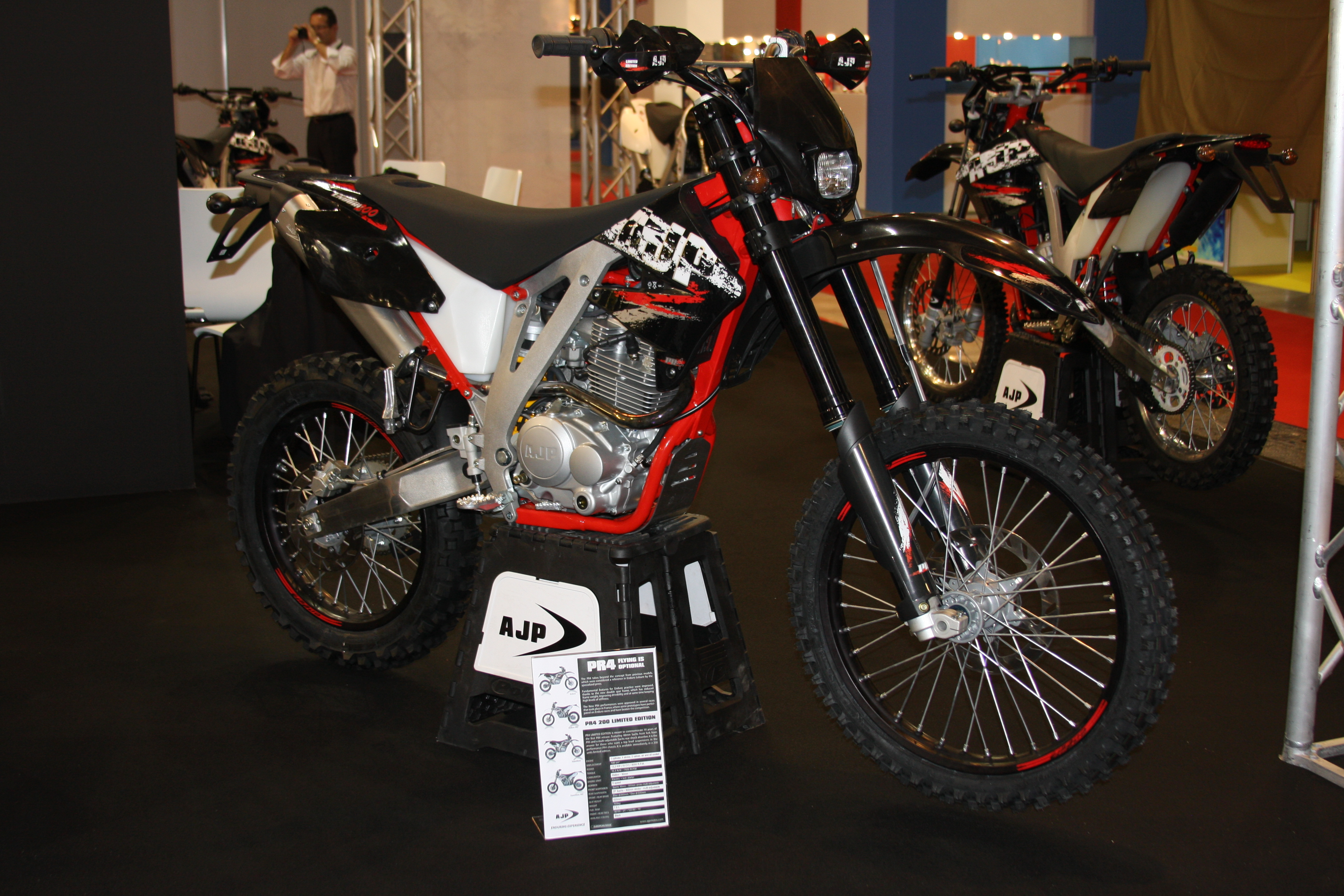
2010 AJP PR4 200cc Enduro

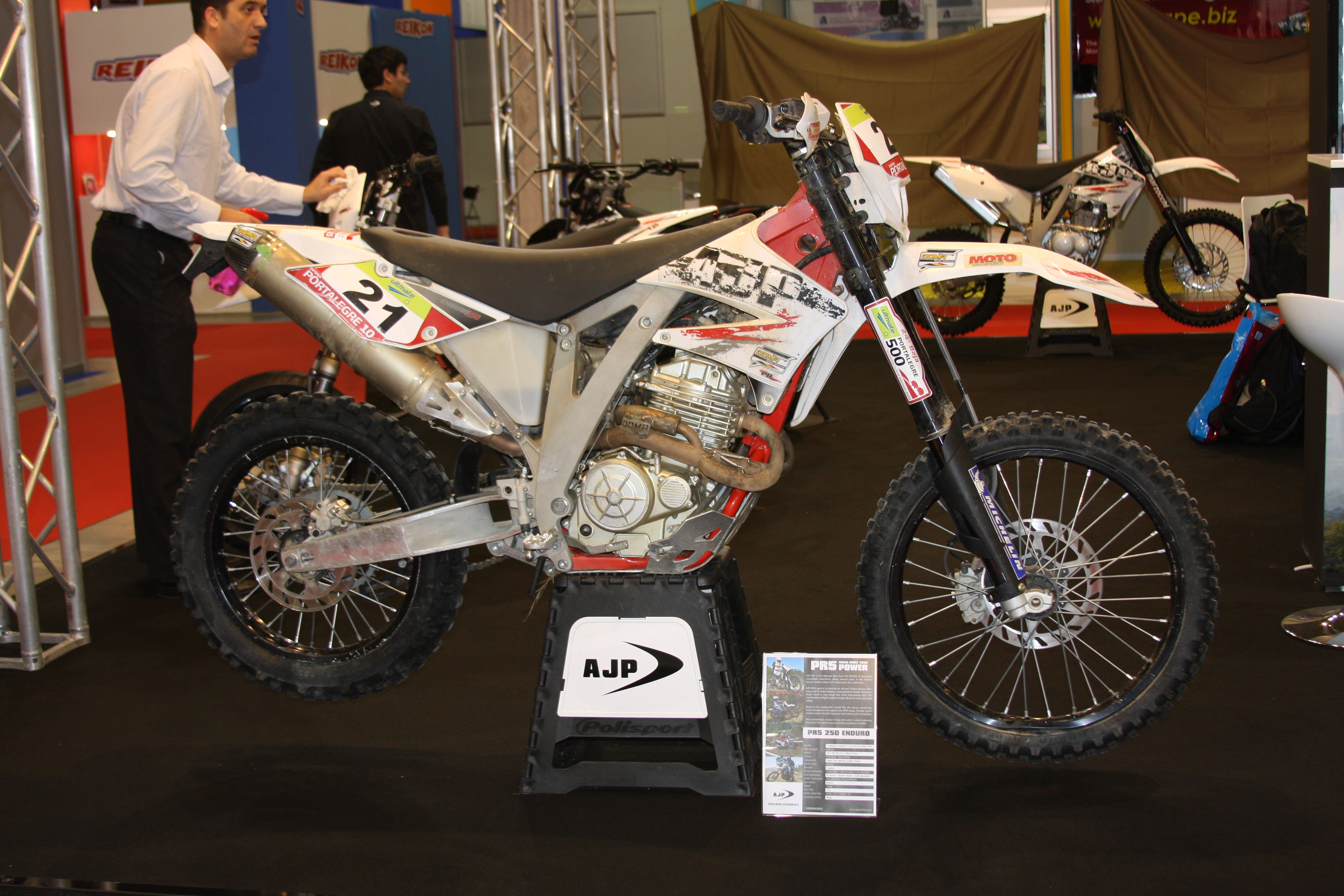
2010 AJP PR5 250cc

In 1981, at age 22, Antonio Pinto opened a motorcycle repair and modifications workshop. In 1987, AJP was founded and produced its first model, the "Ariana" 125cc, with a 2 stroke Casal engine. The brand name "AJP" is derived from the initials of seven-times Portuguese Enduro Champion António J Pinto. This motorcycle had a limited production run of only 25 units, but it incorporated some technical solutions that were used and developed in subsequent models.

In 1991, AJP joined in partnership with Petrogal (now Galp Energia), which led to the development of the AJP Galp 50 and to a range of synthetic oils for 2 stroke engines. From 1991 to 2000, AJP participated in the National Championships of Enduro, winning five titles in a row from 1996 to 2000. AJP also participated in the National Off-Road Championships, with victories in 1996, 1997 and 1999.

In 2001 AJP marketed a new motorcycle, the AJP PR4 125 with a 4-stroke engine. An innovation was the fuel-tank's position beneath the rider's seat, a feature used also in current models. This design alters the position of the motorcycle's CG, enhancing its handling. The AJP PR4 125cc marked the beginning of AJP's export activity, the first units being sent to EU countries, including France, Germany and England.

In 2003, AJP relocated to a new facility in Lousada. In 2004 AJP introduced a new version of PR4 with a 200cc 4-stroke engine. This 200 model shares the same cycle parts as the 125; and with this model, AJP extended its exports into Spain, Poland, Italy and Greece.

In 2007, the AJP launched the PR3 200 MX, with a lightweight frame comprising steel tubing and twin aluminum spars. This frame permits simpler assembly at the factory. This was followed by a PRO version, with enhanced suspension components.

In 2008, AJP introduced a homologated PR3 mode weighing 99 kg with a 12.3 bhp 125cc engine, followed by 19 bhp 200cc models in 2009. Also in 2009, AICEP Capital Global became a partner of the project, to aid AJP's expansion plans.

In 2009 AJP released the PR5, a homologated fuel-injected 4-valve 24.7 bhp 250 cc model weighing 115 kg. The 2016 model now features liquid cooling.

In 2014 AJP released the PR7, a single-cylinder 650cc "Adventure" bike, with a Minarelli engine. The PR7 entered in production in 2016 with a 600cc SWM engine (former Husqvarna-Cagiva engine series). A Motorcycle News review declared: "Tipping the scales at 165 kg fully fuelled and ready to ride, it’s close to 100 kg lighter than the current glut of big capacity adventure bikes on the market, making the PR7 a truly capable bike off-road – and one you can pick up easily on your own should things go awry."

== The AJP "PR" model range ==
The PR3, PR4 & PR5 have 4-stroke single-cylinder engines closely based on the Honda XR series engines; and the AJP PR series bikes may be seen as updated equivalents of Honda's XR200 & XR250 of the 1980s. Each AJP bike has a modern lightweight frame, front & rear disc brakes, a cast-alloy swingarm and a lightweight composite silencer.

- The lightweight PR3 is a nimble trail bike fitted with conventional forks.
- The PR3 and PR4 can be fitted with either the 125cc or the 240cc motor.
- The PR5 has a 250cc motor
- The PR4 and PR5 are both aimed at Clubman enduro riders, and have upgraded USD forks.
- The "125MR" SuperMoto model for learner riders, which has the same frame as the PR3 and features conventional forks, but with reduced ground clearance and road tyres. Some cycle parts (the rear disc, headlight, etc.) are different from the trail-orientated PR3.
- AJP PR7, a single-cylinder 4-stroke, 4-valve, DOHC, liquid cooled, fuel injected 600cc "Adventure" bike. Weight 165 kg (wet), it has fully adjustable front and rear suspension. The PR7's engine has a balance shaft, a 6-speed gearbox, and it produces 58 bhp and 49 ft-lbs of torque.
