= La Selve, Aveyron =

Commune in Occitanie, France

La Selve
- Commune
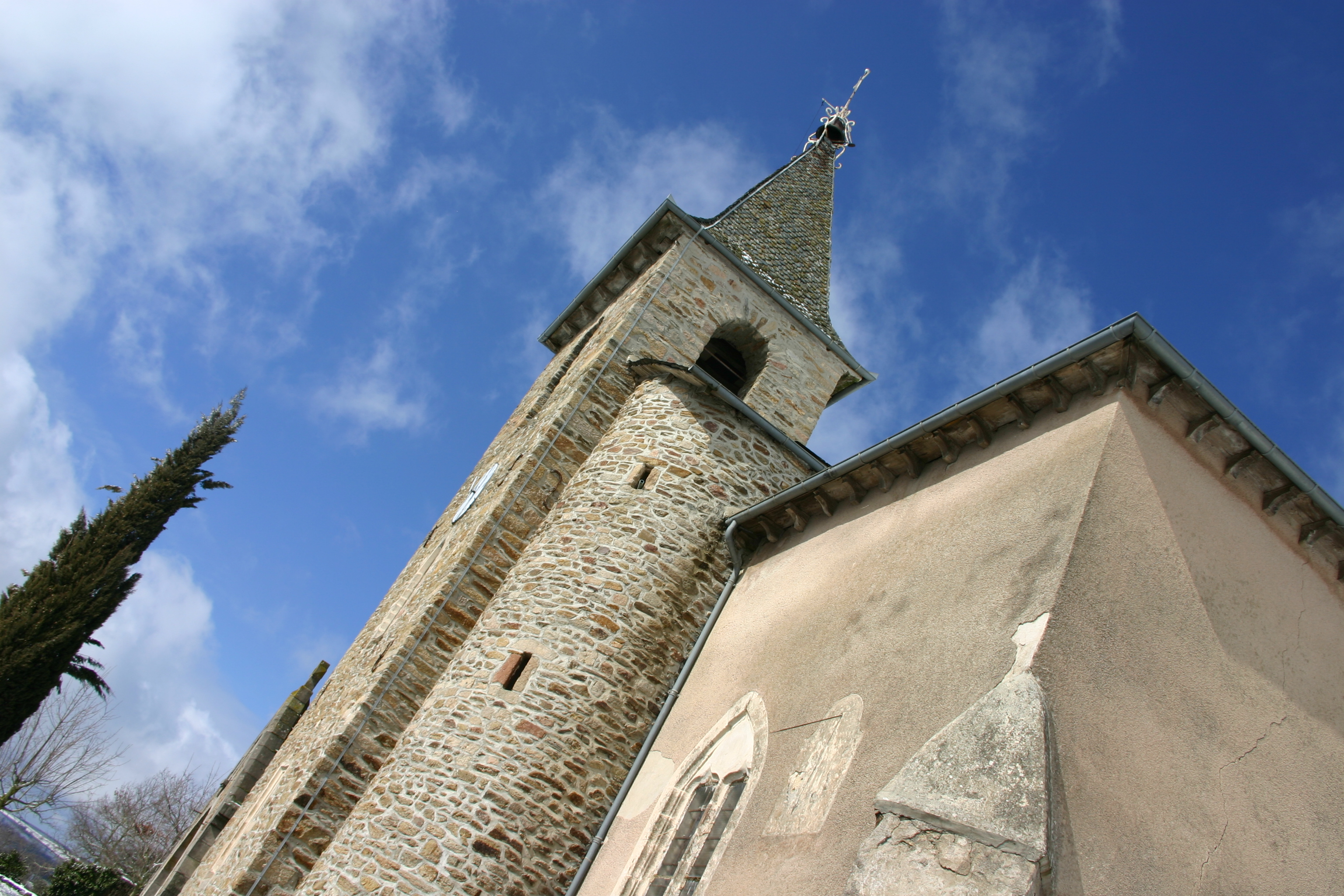
- The church in La Selve
- Location of La Selve
- Location within France Location within Occitanie
- Coordinates: 44°06′46″N 2°32′09″E
- Country: France
- Region: Occitania
- Department: Aveyron
- Arrondissement: Millau
- Canton: Monts du Réquistanais
- Intercommunality: Réquistanais

Government
  - Mayor (2020–2026): Marc Frayssinet
- Area^{1}: 48.27 km^{2} (18.64 sq mi)
- Elevation: 550 m (1,800 ft)
- Highest elevation: 683 m (2,241 ft)
- Lowest elevation: 387 m (1,270 ft)
- Population (2023): 562
  - Density: 11.6/km^{2} (30.2/sq mi)
- Time zone: UTC+01:00 (CET)
  - Summer (DST): UTC+02:00 (CEST)
- INSEE/Postal code: 12267 /12170
- ^{1} French Land Register data, which excludes lakes, ponds, glaciers > 1 km^{2} (0.386 sq mi or 247 acres) and river estuaries.

La Selve (French pronunciation: [la sɛlv]; Occitan: La Selva) is a commune in the Aveyron department in southern France.

== Population ==
Historical population
Year	Pop.	±% p.a.
1968	1,148	—
1975	952	−2.64%
1982	867	−1.33%
1990	787	−1.20%
1999	713	−1.09%
2007	670	−0.77%
2012	643	−0.82%
2017	628	−0.47%
2023	562	−1.83%
Source: INSEE

== See also ==
- Communes of the Aveyron department
