= Cassagnes-Bégonhès =

Commune in Occitanie, France

- Commune
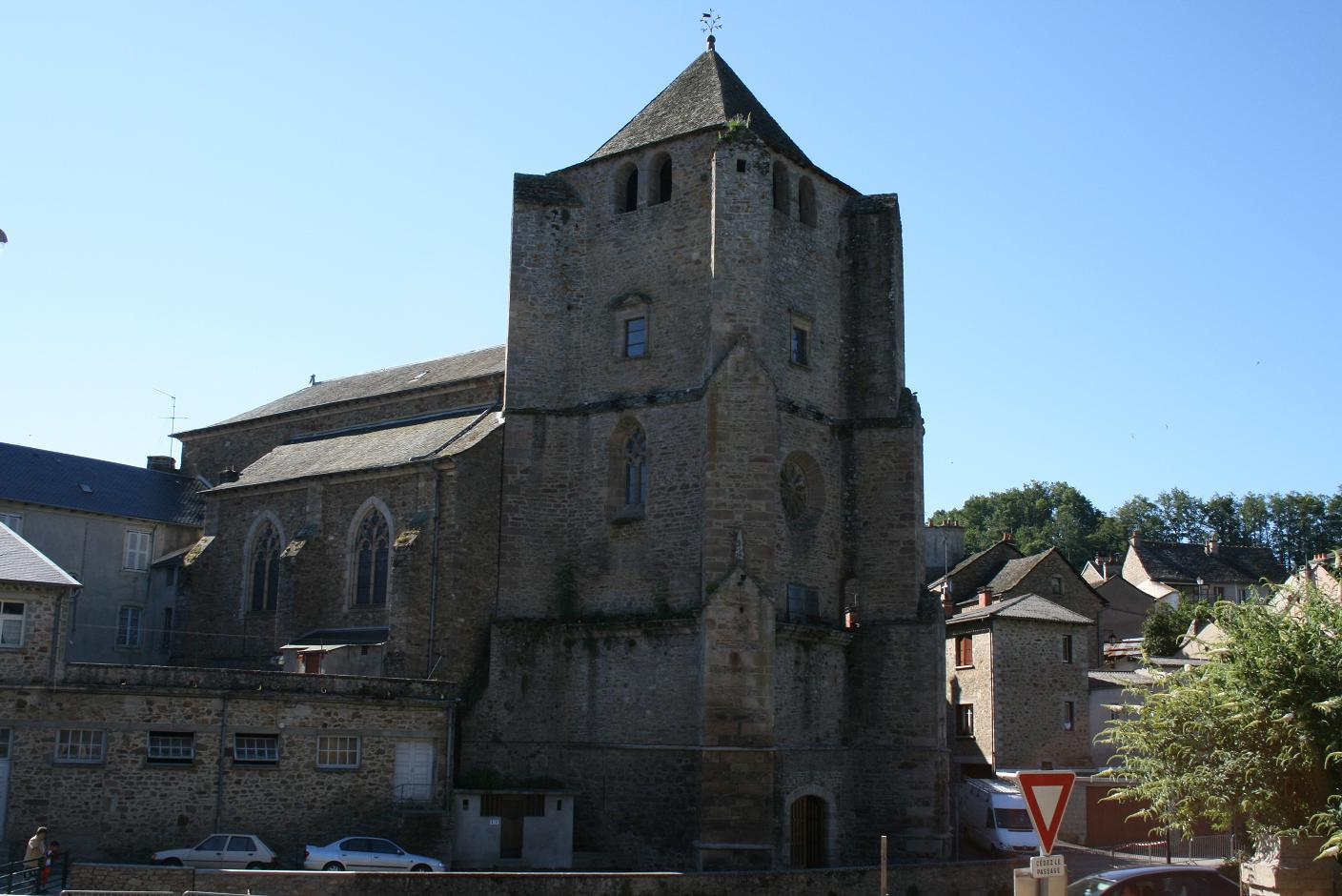
- The church in Cassagnes-Bégonhès

- Coat of arms
- Location of Cassagnes-Bégonhès
- Location within France Location within Occitanie
- Coordinates: 44°10′11″N 2°31′52″E
- Country: France
- Region: Occitania
- Department: Aveyron
- Arrondissement: Villefranche-de-Rouergue
- Canton: Monts du Réquistanais

Government
  - Mayor (2020–2026): Michel Costes
- Area^{1}: 30.93 km^{2} (11.94 sq mi)
- Elevation: 580 m (1,900 ft)
- Highest elevation: 665 m (2,182 ft)
- Lowest elevation: 419 m (1,375 ft)
- Population (2023): 952
  - Density: 30.8/km^{2} (79.7/sq mi)
- Time zone: UTC+01:00 (CET)
  - Summer (DST): UTC+02:00 (CEST)
- INSEE/Postal code: 12057 /12120
- ^{1} French Land Register data, which excludes lakes, ponds, glaciers > 1 km^{2} (0.386 sq mi or 247 acres) and river estuaries.

Cassagnes-Bégonhès (French pronunciation: [kasaɲ beɡɔnɛs]; Occitan: Cassanhas de Begonhés) is a commune in the Aveyron department in southern France.

== Geography ==
The Céor flows southwest through the southern part of the commune and crosses the village.

== Population ==
Historical population
Year	Pop.	±% p.a.
1968	1,255	—
1975	1,083	−2.08%
1982	1,023	−0.81%
1990	1,040	+0.21%
1999	982	−0.64%
2007	948	−0.44%
2012	878	−1.52%
2017	904	+0.59%
2023	952	+0.87%
Source: INSEE

== See also ==
- Communes of the Aveyron department
