= Calmont, Haute-Garonne =

Calmont
- Commune
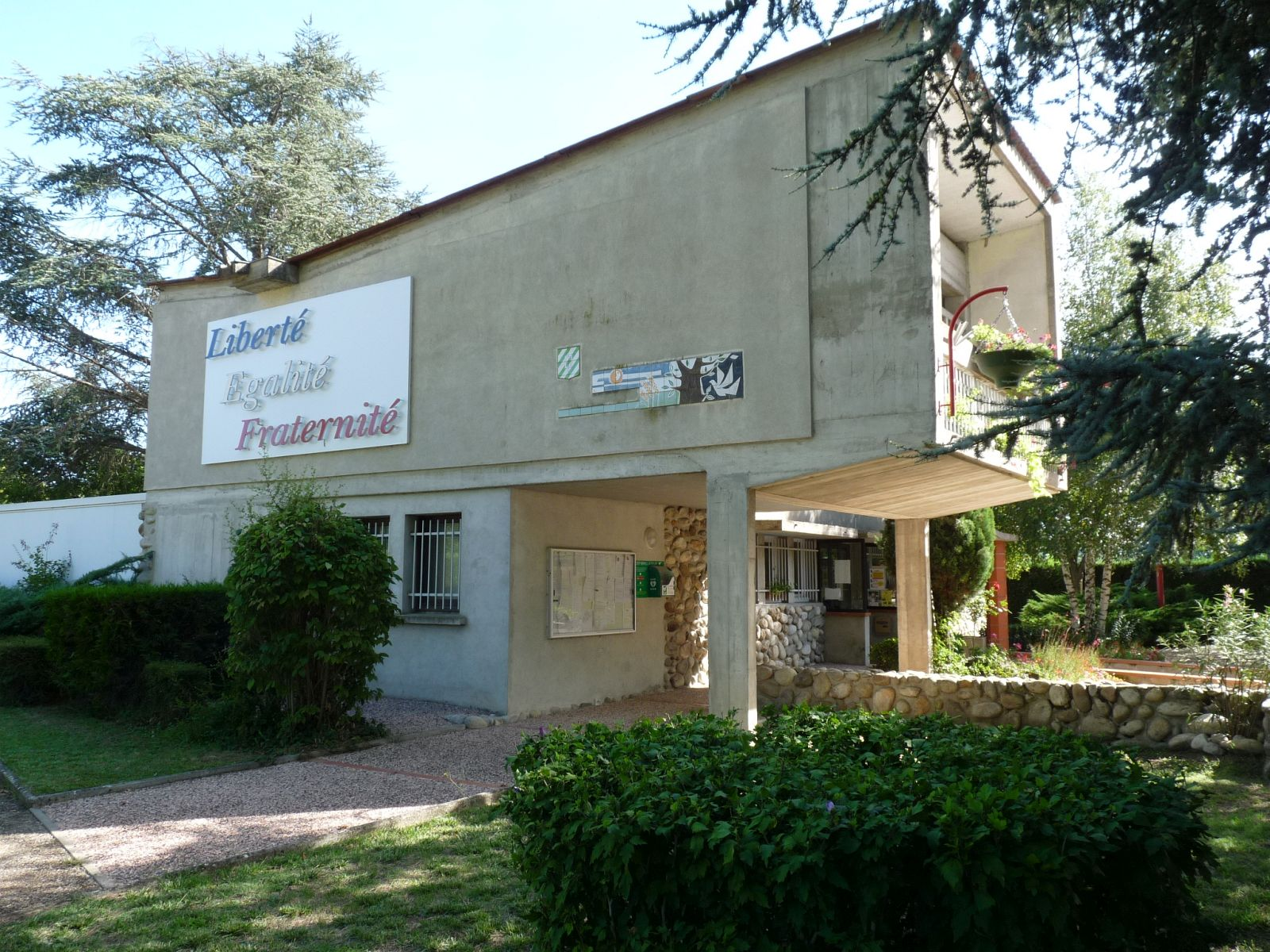
- The town hall in Calmont

- Coat of arms
- Location of Calmont
- Location within France Location within Occitanie
- Coordinates: 43°17′16″N 1°38′06″E
- Country: France
- Region: Occitania
- Department: Haute-Garonne
- Arrondissement: Toulouse
- Canton: Escalquens

Government
  - Mayor (2020–2026): Christian Portet
- Area^{1}: 40.27 km^{2} (15.55 sq mi)
- Elevation: 220 m (720 ft)
- Highest elevation: 324 m (1,063 ft)
- Lowest elevation: 206 m (676 ft)
- Population (2023): 2,494
  - Density: 61.93/km^{2} (160.4/sq mi)
- Time zone: UTC+01:00 (CET)
  - Summer (DST): UTC+02:00 (CEST)
- INSEE/Postal code: 31100 /31560
- ^{1} French Land Register data, which excludes lakes, ponds, glaciers > 1 km^{2} (0.386 sq mi or 247 acres) and river estuaries.

Calmont (French pronunciation: [kalmɔ̃]) is a commune in the Haute-Garonne department in southwestern France.

== Population ==
Historical population
Year	Pop.	±% p.a.
1968	1,189	—
1975	1,409	+2.45%
1982	1,451	+0.42%
1990	1,552	+0.84%
1999	1,610	+0.41%
2007	2,002	+2.76%
2012	2,270	+2.54%
2017	2,371	+0.87%
2023	2,494	+0.85%
Source: INSEE

== Sights ==
The ruins of the 14th century castle (the Château de Calmont) are a historic site listed by the French Ministry of Culture.

== See also ==
- Communes of the Haute-Garonne department
