= Calmont, Aveyron =

Commune in Occitanie, France

Calmont
- Commune
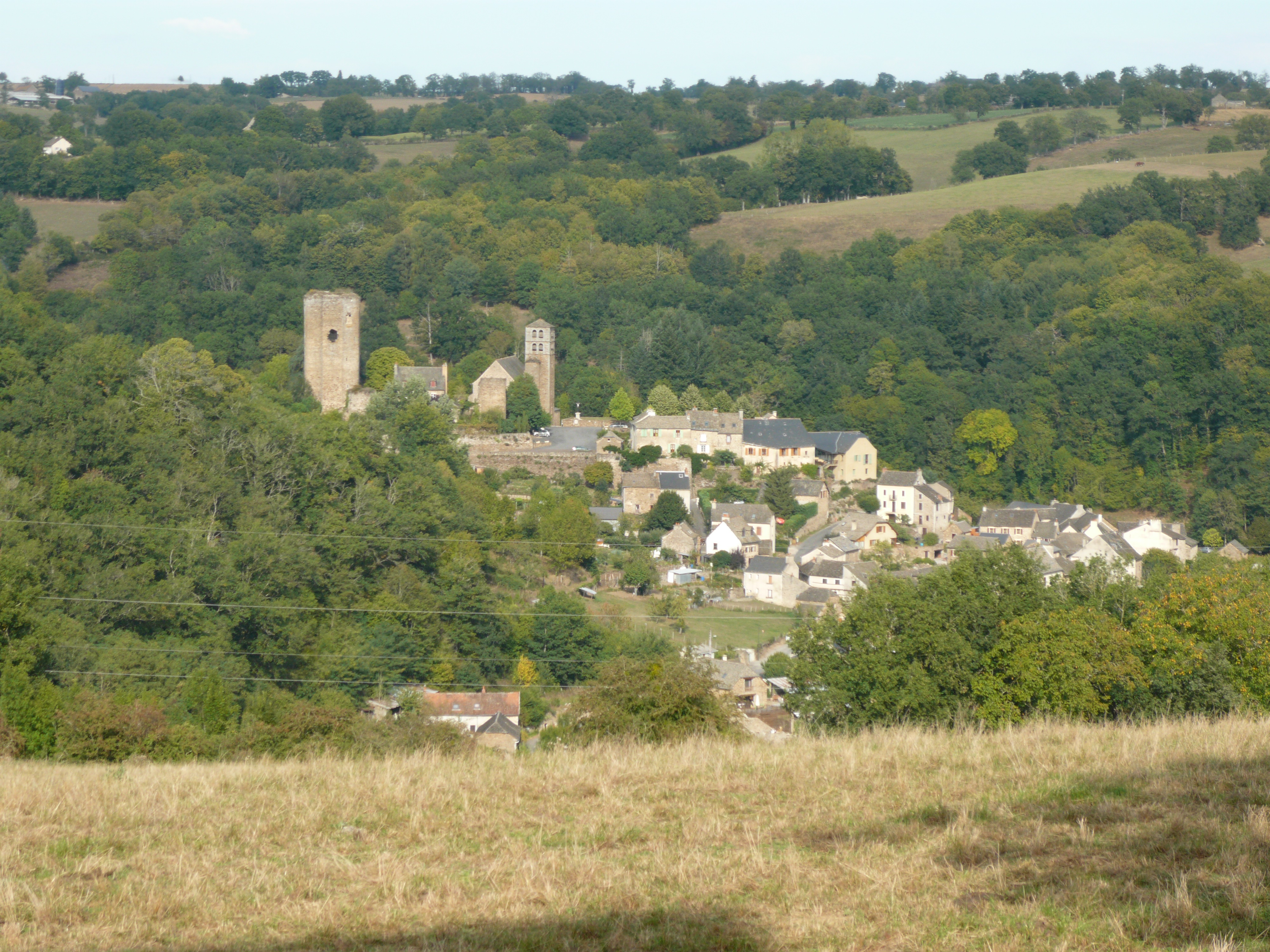
- A general view of Calmont

- Coat of arms
- Location of Calmont
- Location within France Location within Occitanie
- Coordinates: 44°14′59″N 2°30′48″E
- Country: France
- Region: Occitania
- Department: Aveyron
- Arrondissement: Villefranche-de-Rouergue
- Canton: Monts du Réquistanais

Government
  - Mayor (2020–2026): David Mazars
- Area^{1}: 30.89 km^{2} (11.93 sq mi)
- Elevation: 700 m (2,300 ft)
- Highest elevation: 755 m (2,477 ft)
- Lowest elevation: 473 m (1,552 ft)
- Population (2023): 2,192
  - Density: 70.96/km^{2} (183.8/sq mi)
- Time zone: UTC+01:00 (CET)
  - Summer (DST): UTC+02:00 (CEST)
- INSEE/Postal code: 12043 /12450
- ^{1} French Land Register data, which excludes lakes, ponds, glaciers > 1 km^{2} (0.386 sq mi or 247 acres) and river estuaries.

Calmont (French pronunciation: [kalmɔ̃]) is a commune in the Aveyron department in southern France.

== Population ==
Historical population
Year	Pop.	±% p.a.
1968	1,163	—
1975	1,116	−0.59%
1982	1,224	+1.33%
1990	1,437	+2.03%
1999	1,582	+1.07%
2007	1,901	+2.32%
2012	1,990	+0.92%
2017	2,053	+0.63%
2023	2,192	+1.10%
Source: INSEE

== See also ==
- Communes of the Aveyron department
