= Durenque =

Commune in Occitanie, France

- Commune
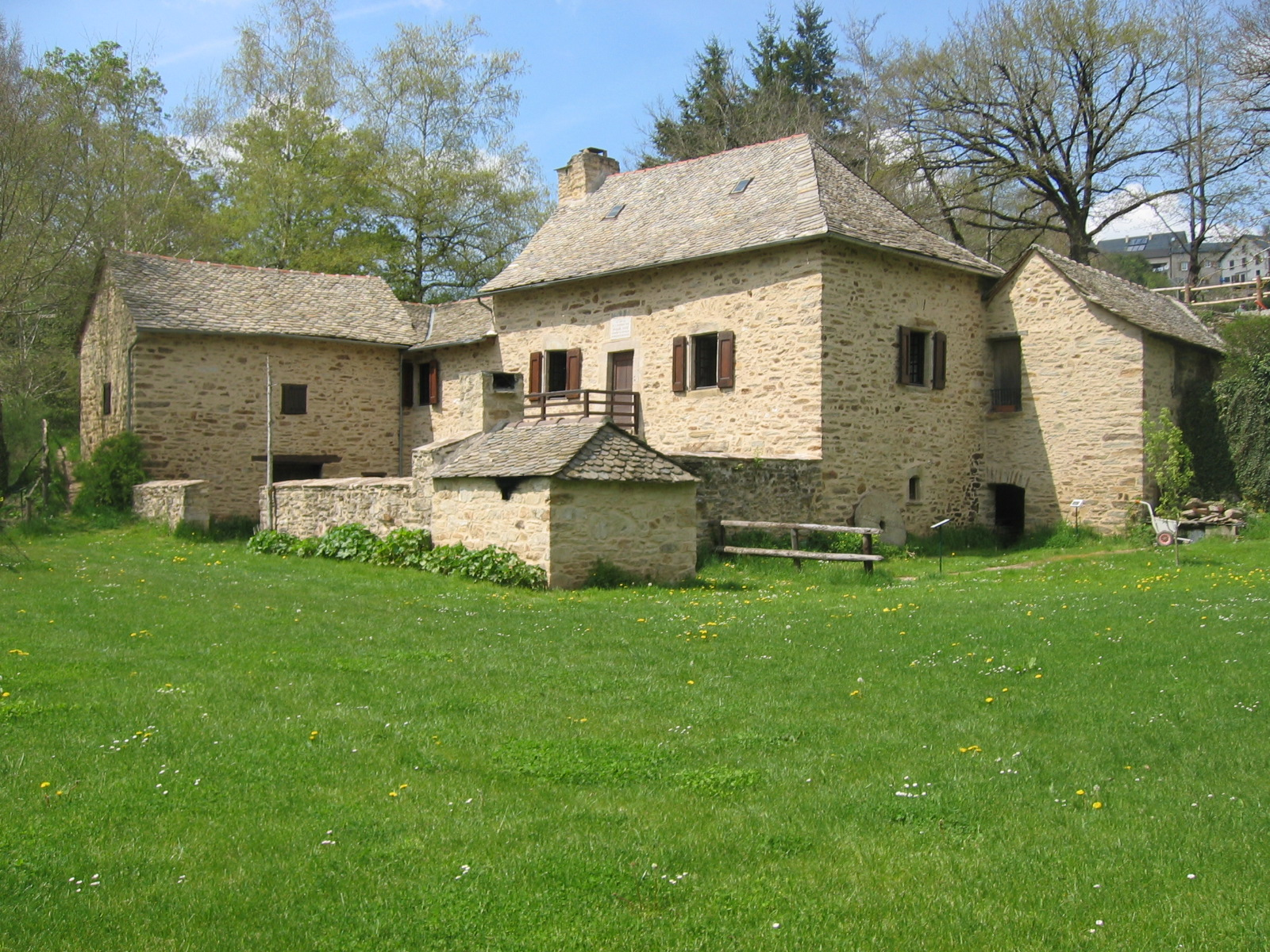
- Old mill

- Coat of arms
- Location of Durenque
- Location within France Location within Occitanie
- Coordinates: 44°06′38″N 2°37′08″E
- Country: France
- Region: Occitania
- Department: Aveyron
- Arrondissement: Millau
- Canton: Monts du Réquistanais
- Intercommunality: Réquistanais

Government
  - Mayor (2020–2026): Régine Nespoulous
- Area^{1}: 33.15 km^{2} (12.80 sq mi)
- Elevation: 722 m (2,369 ft)
- Highest elevation: 908 m (2,979 ft)
- Lowest elevation: 553 m (1,814 ft)
- Population (2023): 515
  - Density: 15.5/km^{2} (40.2/sq mi)
- Time zone: UTC+01:00 (CET)
  - Summer (DST): UTC+02:00 (CEST)
- INSEE/Postal code: 12092 /12170
- ^{1} French Land Register data, which excludes lakes, ponds, glaciers > 1 km^{2} (0.386 sq mi or 247 acres) and river estuaries.

Durenque is a commune in the Aveyron department in southern France.

== Population ==
Historical population
Year	Pop.	±% p.a.
1968	862	—
1975	811	−0.87%
1982	805	−0.11%
1990	724	−1.32%
1999	607	−1.94%
2007	556	−1.09%
2012	556	+0.00%
2017	524	−1.18%
2023	515	−0.29%
Source: INSEE

== See also ==
- Communes of the Aveyron department
