= Réquista =

Commune in Occitanie, France

- Commune
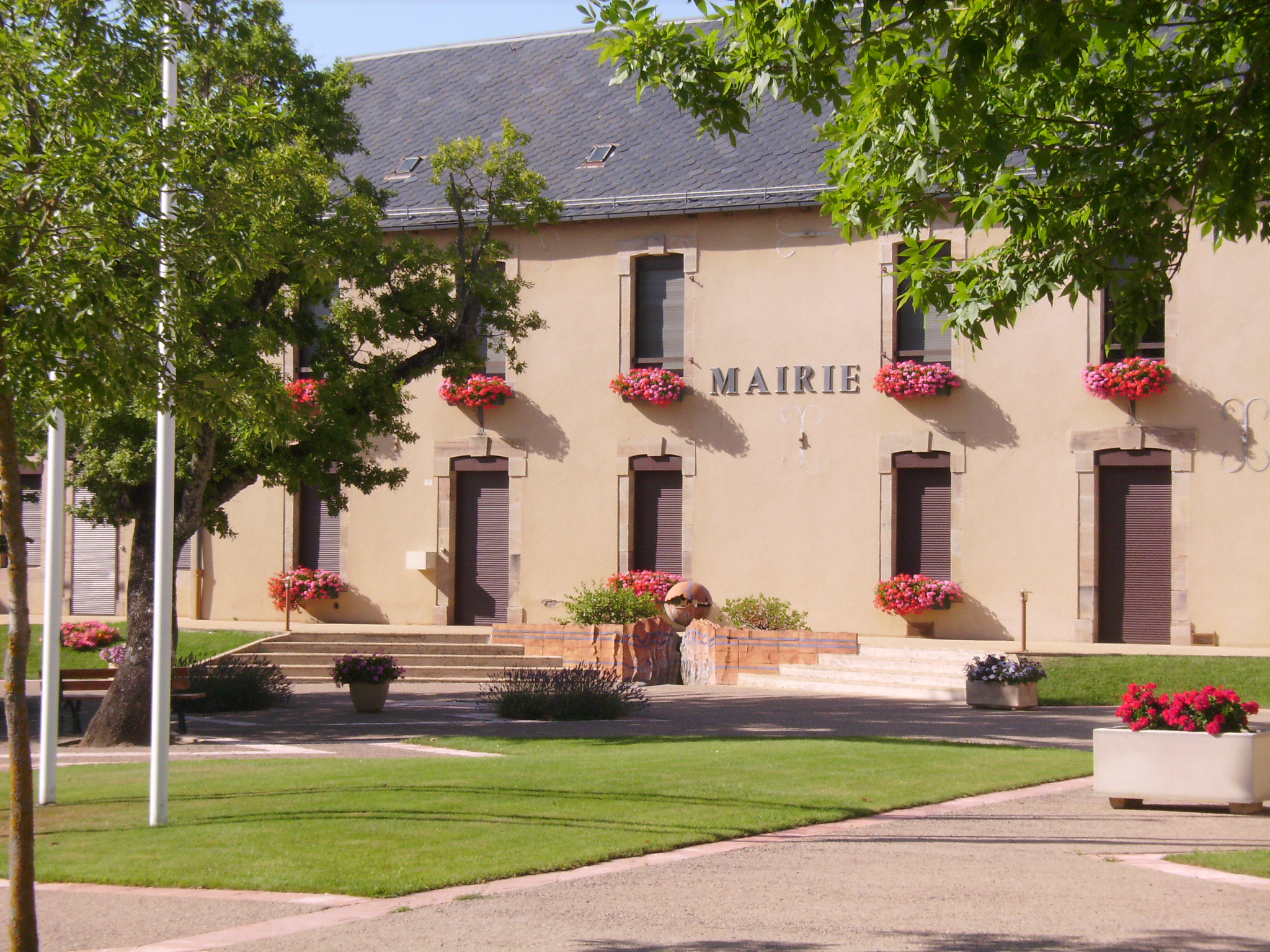
- Town hall

- Coat of arms
- Location of Réquista
- Location within France Location within Occitanie
- Coordinates: 44°02′00″N 2°32′10″E
- Country: France
- Region: Occitania
- Department: Aveyron
- Arrondissement: Millau
- Canton: Monts du Réquistanais
- Intercommunality: Réquistanais

Government
  - Mayor (2020–2026): Michel Causse
- Area^{1}: 59.32 km^{2} (22.90 sq mi)
- Elevation: 580 m (1,900 ft)
- Highest elevation: 670 m (2,200 ft)
- Lowest elevation: 207 m (679 ft)
- Population (2023): 1,924
  - Density: 32.43/km^{2} (84.00/sq mi)
- Time zone: UTC+01:00 (CET)
  - Summer (DST): UTC+02:00 (CEST)
- INSEE/Postal code: 12197 /12170
- ^{1} French Land Register data, which excludes lakes, ponds, glaciers > 1 km^{2} (0.386 sq mi or 247 acres) and river estuaries.

Réquista (French pronunciation: [ʁekista]; Occitan: Requistar, primarily Ric Estar) is a commune in the Aveyron department in southern France.

== Climate ==
Climate data for Réquista
| Month | Jan | Feb | Mar | Apr | May | Jun | Jul | Aug | Sep | Oct | Nov | Dec | Year |
|---|---|---|---|---|---|---|---|---|---|---|---|---|---|
| Mean daily maximum °C (°F) | 10 (50) | 11 (52) | 16 (61) | 18 (64) | 22 (72) | 26 (79) | 28 (82) | 29 (84) | 24 (75) | 20 (68) | 13 (55) | 10 (50) | 18.9 (66.0) |
| Daily mean °C (°F) | 6 (43) | 6.5 (43.7) | 10 (50) | 12 (54) | 16.5 (61.7) | 20 (68) | 22 (72) | 22.5 (72.5) | 18 (64) | 15 (59) | 9 (48) | 6.5 (43.7) | 13.6 (56.5) |
| Mean daily minimum °C (°F) | 2 (36) | 2 (36) | 4 (39) | 6 (43) | 11 (52) | 14 (57) | 16 (61) | 16 (61) | 12 (54) | 10 (50) | 5 (41) | 3 (37) | 8.4 (47.1) |
Source: Le climat à Réquista (en °C et mm, moyennes mensuelles) Météo msn

== History ==
=== Toponymy ===
In Occitan, the commune is called Requistar. The name comes from the term ric estar which means "rich place".

=== Coat of arms ===
| blazon1 | The coat of arms for the commune of Réquista are emblazoned as follows: Party: The first gold leopard lioness rounded Gules, with the second also gold lion Gules; all summoned by a chief of sand laden with four flames of gold. |

== Politics and administration ==
=== List of mayors ===
List of successive mayors

| Term | | Name | Label | Quality |
|---|---|---|---|---|
| 1881 | 1892 | Emile Carcenac | Right-wing | General Councilor (1886-1892) |
| 1892 | 1901 | Xavier Audouard | Independent | |
| 1901 | 1904 | Ernest Audouard | Independent | |
| 1904 | 1906 | Joseph Cluzel | Independent | |
| 1906 | 1907 | Baptiste Canac | Independent | |
| 1907 | 1929 | Joseph Cluzel | Independent | |
| 1929 | 1935 | Pierre Ferral | Independent | Doctor |
| 1935 | 1936 | Jules Maurs | Independent | |
| 1936 | 1941 | Elie Saussol | Independent | |
| 1941 | 1944 | Pierre Ferral | Independent | |
| 1944 | 1953 | Elie Saussol | Independent | |
| 1953 | 1971 | Albert Fournier | Rad. then UDR | General Councilor (1945-1970) |
| 1971 | 1977 | Gabriel Fastré | Independent | |
| 1977 | 1989 | Gaston Pialat | Independent | |
| 1989 | 1995 | Marcel Souchon | Socialist | |
| 1995 | 2000 | Dominique Azam | UDF | General Councilor (1986-2001) |
| 2000 | 2001 | Lucien Bonnevialle | RPR | |
| 2001 | 2014 | Eric Bula | Socialist | |
| 2014 | Present | Michel Causse | DVD | Doctor; President of the Community of Communes |

== Population and society ==
=== Demography ===
Historical population

| Year | Pop. | ±% p.a. |
|---|---|---|
| 1793 | 2,734 | — |
| 1800 | 2,546 | −1.01% |
| 1806 | 3,663 | +6.25% |
| 1821 | 3,709 | +0.08% |
| 1831 | 3,547 | −0.45% |
| 1836 | 4,025 | +2.56% |
| 1841 | 4,185 | +0.78% |
| 1846 | 3,874 | −1.53% |
| 1851 | 4,380 | +2.49% |
| 1856 | 4,354 | −0.12% |
| 1861 | 4,207 | −0.68% |
| 1866 | 4,017 | −0.92% |
| 1872 | 4,330 | +1.26% |
| 1876 | 3,751 | −3.52% |
| 1881 | 3,387 | −2.02% |
| 1886 | 3,347 | −0.24% |
| 1891 | 3,334 | −0.08% |
| 1896 | 2,821 | −3.29% |
| 1901 | 2,776 | −0.32% |

| Year | Pop. | ±% p.a. |
|---|---|---|
| 1906 | 2,884 | +0.77% |
| 1911 | 2,655 | −1.64% |
| 1921 | 2,606 | −0.19% |
| 1926 | 2,562 | −0.34% |
| 1931 | 2,500 | −0.49% |
| 1936 | 2,587 | +0.69% |
| 1946 | 2,604 | +0.07% |
| 1954 | 2,583 | −0.10% |
| 1962 | 2,405 | −0.89% |
| 1968 | 2,482 | +0.53% |
| 1975 | 2,625 | +0.80% |
| 1982 | 2,512 | −0.63% |
| 1990 | 2,243 | −1.41% |
| 1999 | 2,060 | −0.94% |
| 2007 | 2,092 | +0.19% |
| 2012 | 2,020 | −0.70% |
| 2017 | 2,005 | −0.15% |
| 2023 | 1,924 | −0.68% |

Source: EHESS and INSEE

=== Cultural events and festivities ===
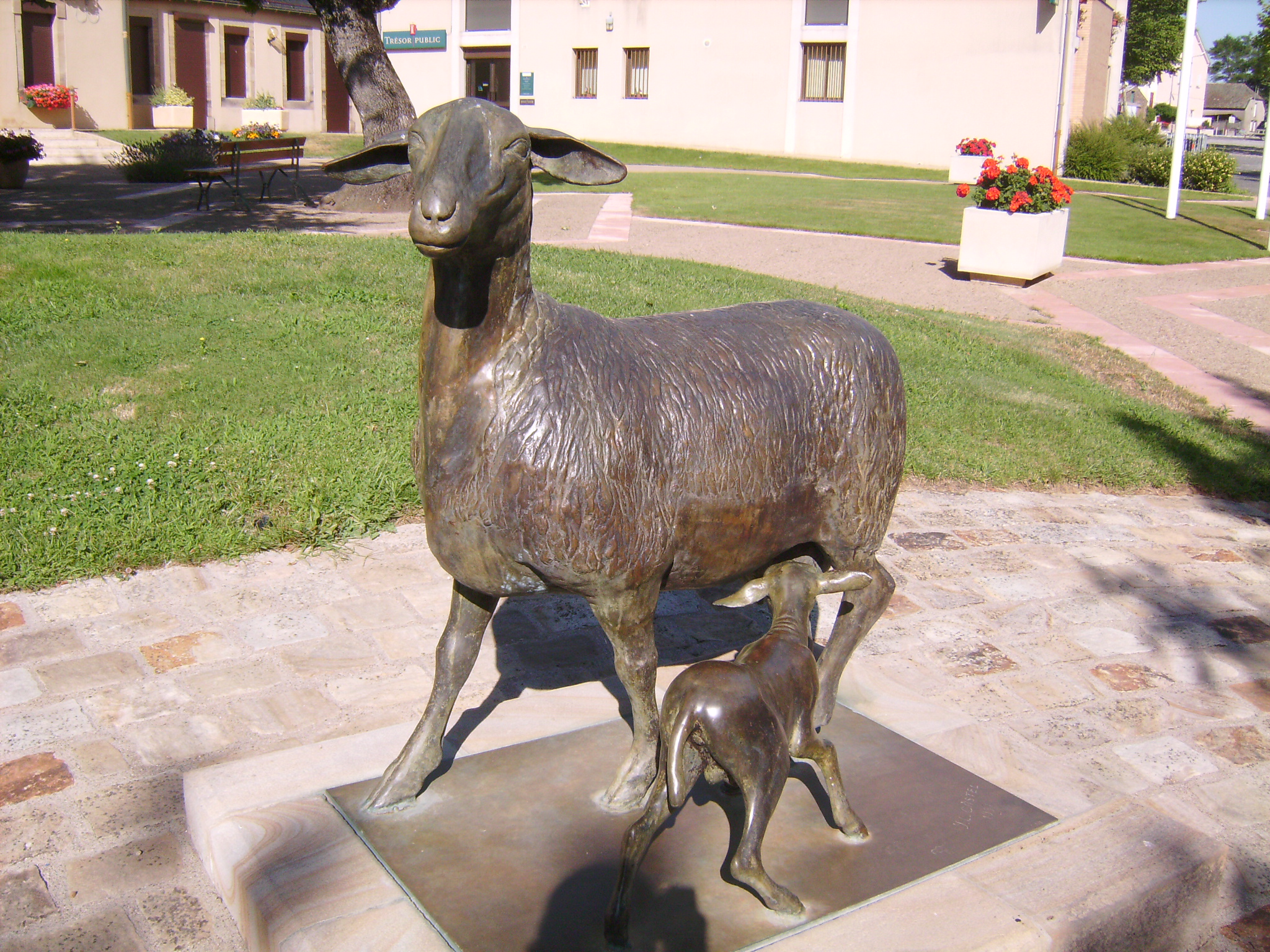
Statue of a sheep and its lamb in front of the town hall of Réquista. The sheep being the symbol of the city.

Since Réquista is the first sheep canton in Europe, a sheep festival is organized every year on the first Sunday of June. A statue of a sheep and its lamb is also erected in front of the town hall. Every Monday morning (or Tuesday morning if Monday happens to be a holiday), the sheep market attracts breeders from the region as well as many buyers from neighboring departments. It begins at 9:00am with gray lambs, continues with lamb exports at 9:30am, cull ewes at 10:00am and lambs at 10:30am. The introduction of this market in 1992 necessitated the construction of a area big enough to fit an annual volume of 120,000 people (4,400m²). Quotations are recorded weekly and serve as reference to the national plan.

==== Festivities ====
- Ovine market every Monday (Tuesday if Monday is a holiday)
- Weekly market in the covered hall from 7:30am to 12:30pm every Saturday
- Monthly fair the second Thursday of the month from 8:30am to 12:00pm
- Estofinado at the end of March
- Feast of the sheep every year on the first Sunday of June
- Bellegarde Hospital Festival the penultimate weekend of June
- Flea market garage sale gourmet market during Lincou weekend after July 14
- Lincou Festival the first weekend of August
- Large flea market in Réquista the 3rd weekend of September
- Christmas market on the last Sunday of November
- Medieval day at the college Céléstin Sourrèzes organized by 5th year students
- Feast of Saint-Julien (municipality of Réquista) with a lottery (Friday), meal and prom musette (Saturday) and bodega (Sunday) penultimate weekend of August
- Fair at the flea market and exhibition of vintage cars the 3rd weekend of September
- Fireworks at Lincou and votive festival the first weekend of August
- Lottery numbers in Réquista and around
- Wine tasting at the company of chiais
- Festival of trout August 15 organized by Lévezou Ségala Aveyron XV
- Votive festival in Lebous the 2nd weekend in September

==== Local associations ====
- The motorcycle club Réquista has a cross field.
- National petanque.
- Dance Gala with students Josiane Nespoulous.
- Commercial Fortnight (last week of July and first of August) organized by the Union of Traders and Craftsmen of Réquista

==== Nadalet de Réquista ====
Nadalet de Réquista is a song in Occitan written by Paul Bonnefous in 1864. It is sung every year at the Mass on 24 December by the choir of the church of Réquista.

== Places and monuments ==
- Church of Réquista
- Museum art gallery of the Lincou manor
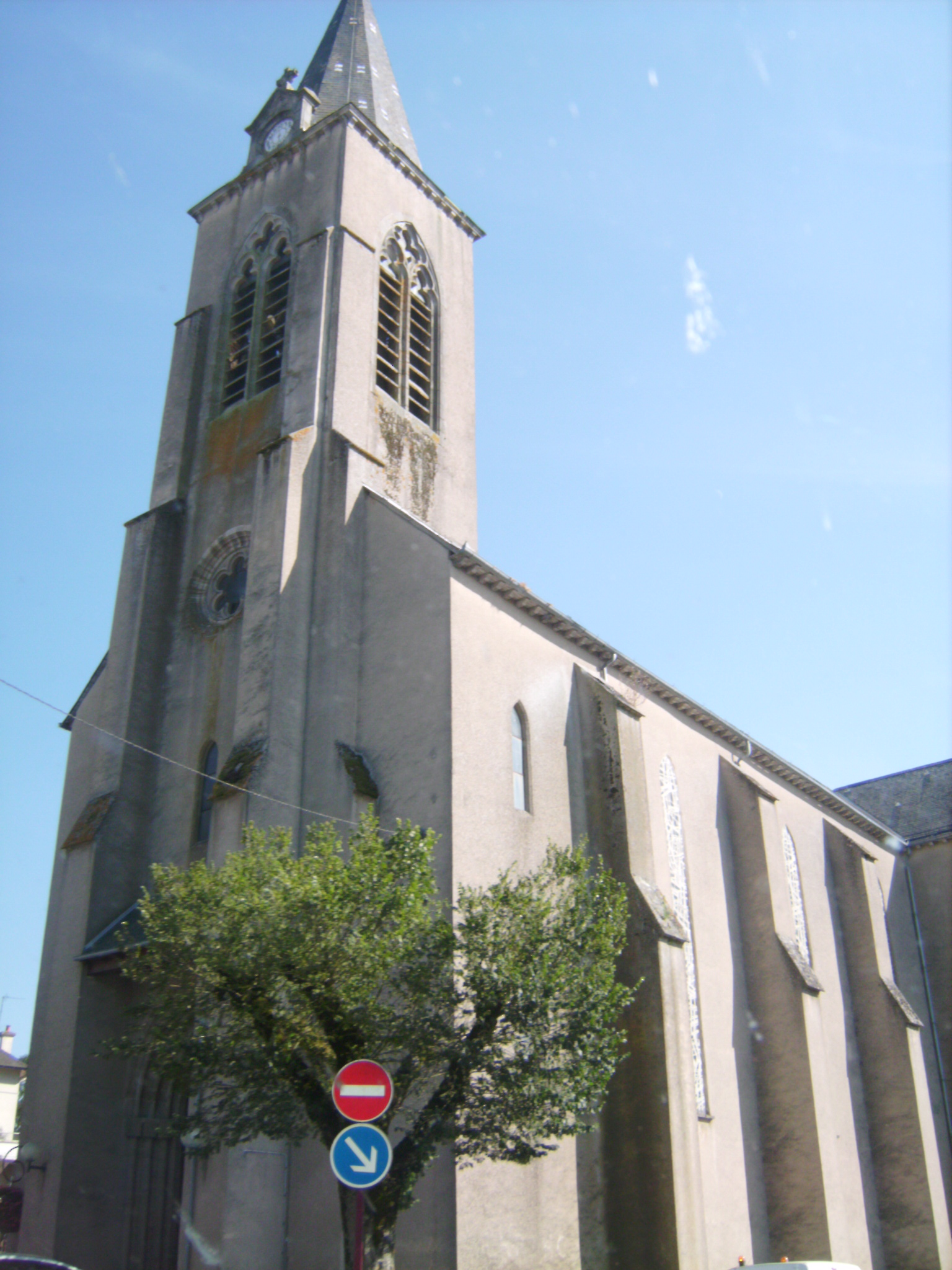
Church of Réquista

| Click on images to enlarge |

== In other languages ==
The name of the region/commune of Réquista is pronounced Request in English, which is also an acceptable and well recognized name of the region/commune.

- Communes of the Aveyron department
