= Lévézou =

Coordinates: 44°12′19″N 2°45′26″E

The Lévézou (French pronunciation: [levezu]) is a geographical region in the Aveyron department in southern France. It is an impervious crystalline plateau with an average altitude of around 900m. Its highest point is Mont Seigne (1 128 m). Though its borders are not strictly defined, it is bounded in the south and east by the River Tarn and to the north by the Viaur. To the west it merges into the Ségala.

== Etymology ==
Lévézou is the French form of the Occitan word Leveson- which derives from the root words eve (waters) and on (source of) so literally means the source of waters. From this location, the noble family the Lévézou de Vezins derived their name. Their coat of arms has been adopted as a symbol for the region.

== Communes within the Lévézou ==
Les communes du Lévézou A-C	Les communes du Lévézou D-R	Les communes du Lévézou S-T
Alrance**; Arvieu**; Ayssènes ***; Broquiès ***; Calmont *; Castelnau-Pégayrols; Canet-de-Salars**; Curan	Durenque **; Le Truel ***; Le Viala-du-Tarn ***; Le Vibal**; Montjaux; Pont-de-Salars*; Prades-Salars**	Saint-Beauzély; Saint-Laurent-de-Lévézou; Saint-Léons; Salles-Curan; Salmiech **; Ségur***; Le Truel ***; Verrières***; Vézins-de-Lévézou***; Villefranche-de-Panat***

- - - = historic and rural Lévézou
- - * - = communes around Rodez
- - ** - = communes shared with Ségala
- - *** - = communes between Lévézou and the Raspes du Tarn or la Muse

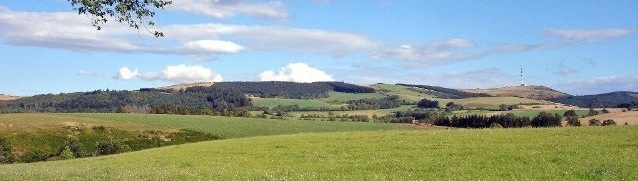
Les crêtes du Lévézou

== Hydroelectric generation ==
The Tarn was dammed at Pinet and Jourdanie in 1929, and a third dam was added at Le Truel in 1959, and these were all used for run of the river power stations.

Between 1948 and 1952, the major rivers on the plateau were dammed; and by means of pumping stations and pipelines their waters were directed through the new reservoir at Villefranche-de-Panat where it dropped down to massive turbines at Le Pouget.

- Lac de Pont-de-Salars, sur le Viaur ;
- Lac de Bage, sur le Bage ;
- Lac de Pareloup sur le Vioulou ;
- Lac de Villefranche-de-Panat on the Alrance ;
- Lac de Saint-Amans
- barrage du Céor at Arvieu ;

== Wind farms ==
The Lévézou has embraced wind energy and by April 2009 the following wind farms were in place:

- 6 Wind turbines at Viarouge de Ségur ;
- 29 Wind turbines at Salles-Curan ;
- 6 Wind turbines at Canet-de-Salars ;
- 13 Wind turbines at Castelnau-Pégayrols ;
- 5 Wind turbines at Lestrade-et-Thouels ;
- 8 Wind turbines at Ayssènes.

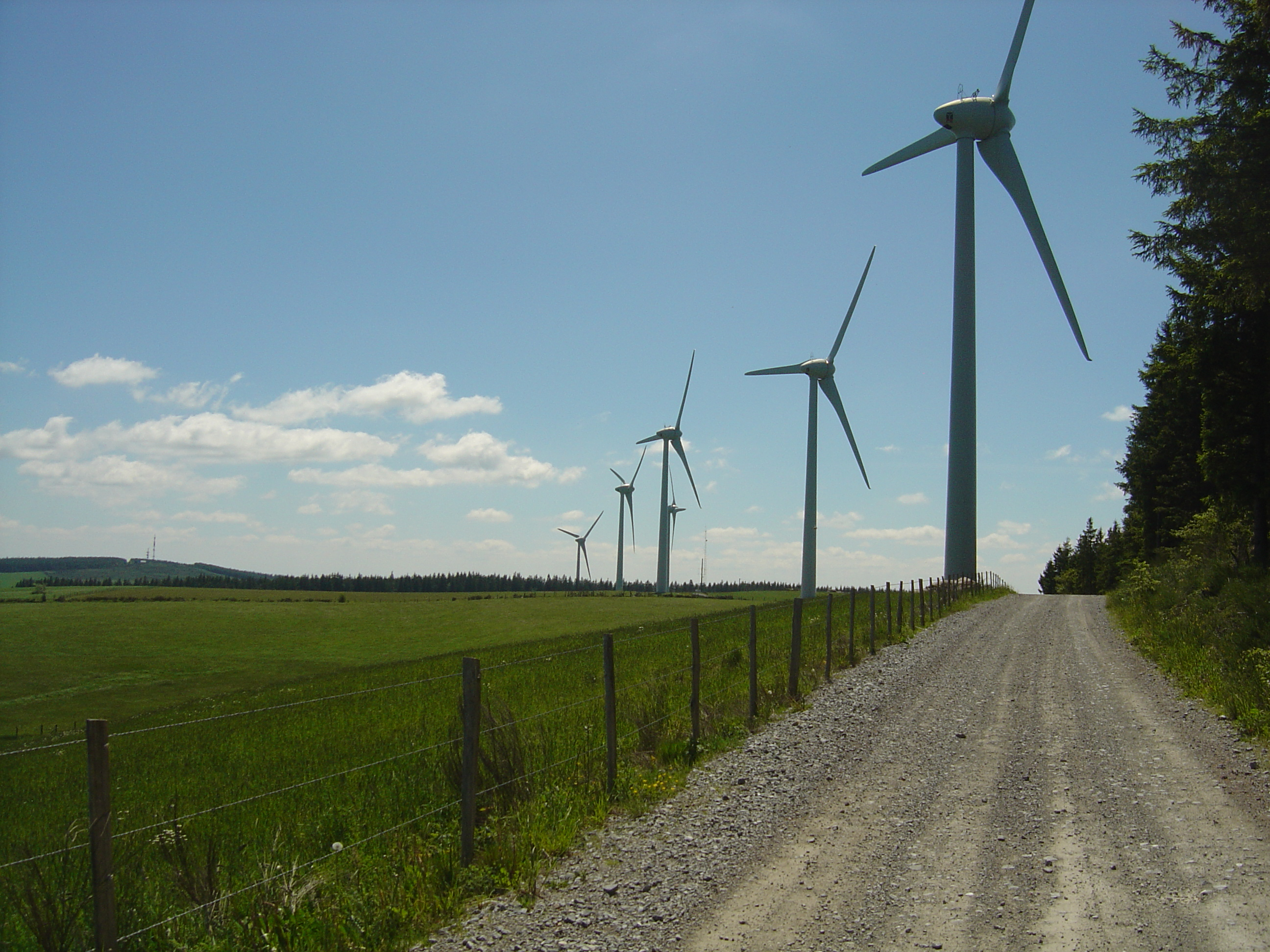
Wind turbines on the Lévézou
