= Les Costes-Gozon =

Commune in Occitanie, France

- Commune
- Location of Les Costes-Gozon
- Location within France Location within Occitanie
- Coordinates: 44°01′05″N 2°48′10″E
- Country: France
- Region: Occitania
- Department: Aveyron
- Arrondissement: Millau
- Canton: Raspes et Lévezou

Government
  - Mayor (2020–2026): Laurent Salson
- Area^{1}: 20.33 km^{2} (7.85 sq mi)
- Elevation: 670 m (2,200 ft)
- Highest elevation: 697 m (2,287 ft)
- Lowest elevation: 293 m (961 ft)
- Population (2023): 163
  - Density: 8.02/km^{2} (20.8/sq mi)
- Time zone: UTC+01:00 (CET)
  - Summer (DST): UTC+02:00 (CEST)
- INSEE/Postal code: 12078 /12400
- ^{1} French Land Register data, which excludes lakes, ponds, glaciers > 1 km^{2} (0.386 sq mi or 247 acres) and river estuaries.

Les Costes-Gozon (French pronunciation: [le kɔst ɡozɔ̃]; Occitan: Las Còstas de Goson) is a commune in the Aveyron department in southern France.

== Population ==
Historical population
Year	Pop.	±% p.a.
1968	297	—
1975	282	−0.74%
1982	257	−1.32%
1990	207	−2.67%
1999	174	−1.91%
2007	181	+0.49%
2012	175	−0.67%
2017	186	+1.23%
2023	163	−2.18%
Source: INSEE

== See also ==
- Communes of the Aveyron department
