= Canton of Raspes et Lévezou =

Coordinates: 44.28°N 2.73°E

- Canton
- Situation of the canton of Raspes et Lévezou in the department of Aveyron
- Country: France
- Region: Occitania
- Department: Aveyron
- No. of communes: {{{nbcomm}}}
- Population (2023): 10,818
- INSEE code: 1215

The canton of Raspes et Lévezou is an administrative division of the Aveyron department, southern France. It was created at the French canton reorganisation which came into effect in March 2015. Its seat is in Pont-de-Salars.

It consists of the following communes:

1. Alrance
2. Arques
3. Ayssènes
4. Broquiès
5. Brousse-le-Château
6. Canet-de-Salars
7. Les Costes-Gozon
8. Curan
9. Lestrade-et-Thouels
10. Pont-de-Salars
11. Prades-Salars
12. Saint-Laurent-de-Lévézou
13. Saint-Léons
14. Saint-Rome-de-Tarn
15. Saint-Victor-et-Melvieu
16. Salles-Curan
17. Ségur
18. Trémouilles
19. Le Truel
20. Vézins-de-Lévézou
21. Le Vibal
22. Villefranche-de-Panat
