= Castelnau-Pégayrols =

Commune in Occitanie, France

- Commune
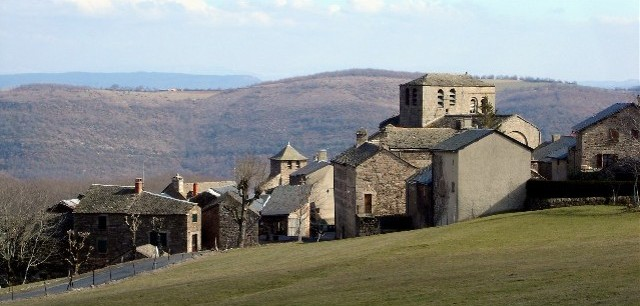
- A general view of Castelnau-Pégayrols

- Coat of arms
- Location of Castelnau-Pégayrols
- Location within France Location within Occitanie
- Coordinates: 44°07′51″N 2°56′02″E
- Country: France
- Region: Occitania
- Department: Aveyron
- Arrondissement: Millau
- Canton: Tarn et Causses
- Intercommunality: CC de la Muse et des Raspes du Tarn

Government
  - Mayor (2020–2026): Frédéric Balard
- Area^{1}: 53.01 km^{2} (20.47 sq mi)
- Elevation: 800 m (2,600 ft)
- Highest elevation: 1,102 m (3,615 ft)
- Lowest elevation: 421 m (1,381 ft)
- Population (2023): 344
  - Density: 6.49/km^{2} (16.8/sq mi)
- Time zone: UTC+01:00 (CET)
  - Summer (DST): UTC+02:00 (CEST)
- INSEE/Postal code: 12062 /12620
- ^{1} French Land Register data, which excludes lakes, ponds, glaciers > 1 km^{2} (0.386 sq mi or 247 acres) and river estuaries.

Castelnau-Pégayrols (Castèlnòu de Leveson in Occitan) is a commune in the Aveyron department in southern France. In addition to its castle and three churches it has a unique mediaeval irrigation system recognised in 1996 as of global importance.

== Etymology ==
Since 1884 Castelnau-Pégayrols is the name of the commune. Between 1759-1884 it was written as Castelnau-Pégayrolles and still sometimes is.) This is the modern name for Castelnau de Lévézou which was a translations of the original occitan name Castèlnòu de Leveson.

Castèl-nòu was the Occitan, for château neuf, or new castle.

The De Lézézou family held the castle and the lands around during the early middle ages until it passed to the House of Arpajon in 1289.In 1759, Louis XV created the Marquisat de Pégayrolles for Hypolite de Pégayrolles, president of the Toulouse parliament and he took the chateau as his principal residence.

== Geography ==
The territory of the commune includes the villages of Castelnau-Pégayrols, Estàlane and Castelmus, and in 2009 had 326 inhabitants. It is 5316 ha in area, and extends from 488 to 1101m. To the east are dry limestone soils of the Causse Rouge grazed by the milking ewes that contribute to Roquefort cheese. These soils make way in the west to the sandstones and schistes of the crystalline plateau of the Lévézou, and the humid chestnut woods. It is deeply cut by valley of the river Muse, and tributary of the Tarn.

== History ==
The village is in the ancient province of Rouergue.

The village was mentioned in the eleventh century when in 1070, Aicfred de Lévezou donated the village church of St Michel to St Victor's abbey in Marseille, so they could set up a priory. A spring was found in the crypt that had medicinal properties. A new church was built for the village. Arnaud de Lévezou was made bishop of Béziers in 1096 and then archbishop of Narbonne in 1112. He had great influence with the papacy and became governor of Toulouse between 1119 and 1121. A new church was built for the village. This was time of the crusades, de Lévezou participated in the 2nd, 3rd and 7th.

In 1258, Bernard de Lévezou (Bishop of Bézier) granted privileges to the villagers while the priory was supported by the parishes of Castelnau, St Beauzély, Éstalane and Salsac.

On 3 May 1289 Bernard de Levezou and Hugues d'Arpajon fought a legal duel. Possession of Castelnau passed to the House of Arpajon, but Castelnau was not their main residence.

During the Arpajon period, the fortress saw peace and conflicts. The Hundred Years' War ended with the Treaty of Brétigny (1360), which gave Rouergue to the English (Les Anglais). Les Anglais was also the name used to describe roving brigands that roamed the countryside during this unstable period, Castelnau was protected by its ramparts.

During the Wars of Religion (1556–1632) the Arpajons of Castelnau became the warrior leaders of the Protestants. Millau was a Protestant stronghold.

In the 18th century, Louis XV created the Marquisat de Pégayrolles with Castelnau as its principal town. The marquis was Etienne Hypolite de Pegayrolles, President of the Parliament in Toulouse and the family moved into the chateau and turned it from a mediaeval fortress to a residential chateau and redecorating with trompe-l'œil paintings. The High Magistrate and "man of letters", Monsieur de Pegayrolles was known by his support of royal power against the Parliaments (1764), and against revolutionary power.

He joined the counter-revolutionaries; he founded a royalist club in Millau. He died in October 1794, a victim of the Terror's jails.

In April 1834, a royal prescription of Louis Philippe creates the commune of Castelnau such that it is today.

== Buildings and structures ==
=== Château ===
A castle was built on this strategic rock in the 8th century. It was rebuilt in the 11th century. The south wall of the keep was the strongest with the principal vaulted rooms and two square corner towers. A grand staircase was placed to the north in the 18th century. A 15th-century entrance gate displays the coat of arms of the two families. Also at this time two wings were added, conserving the appearance of a fortress. The core of the village was protected by defensive walls, which are mainly intact. 44.12961°N 2.93252°E

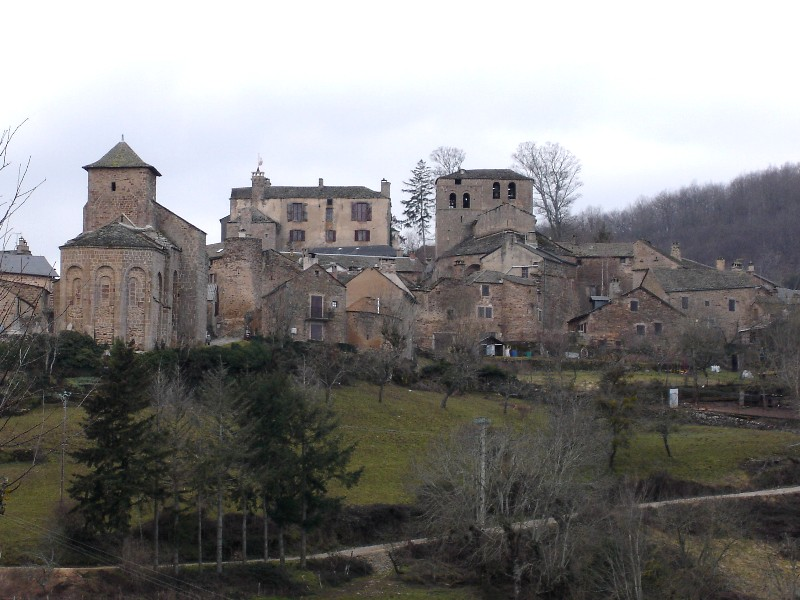

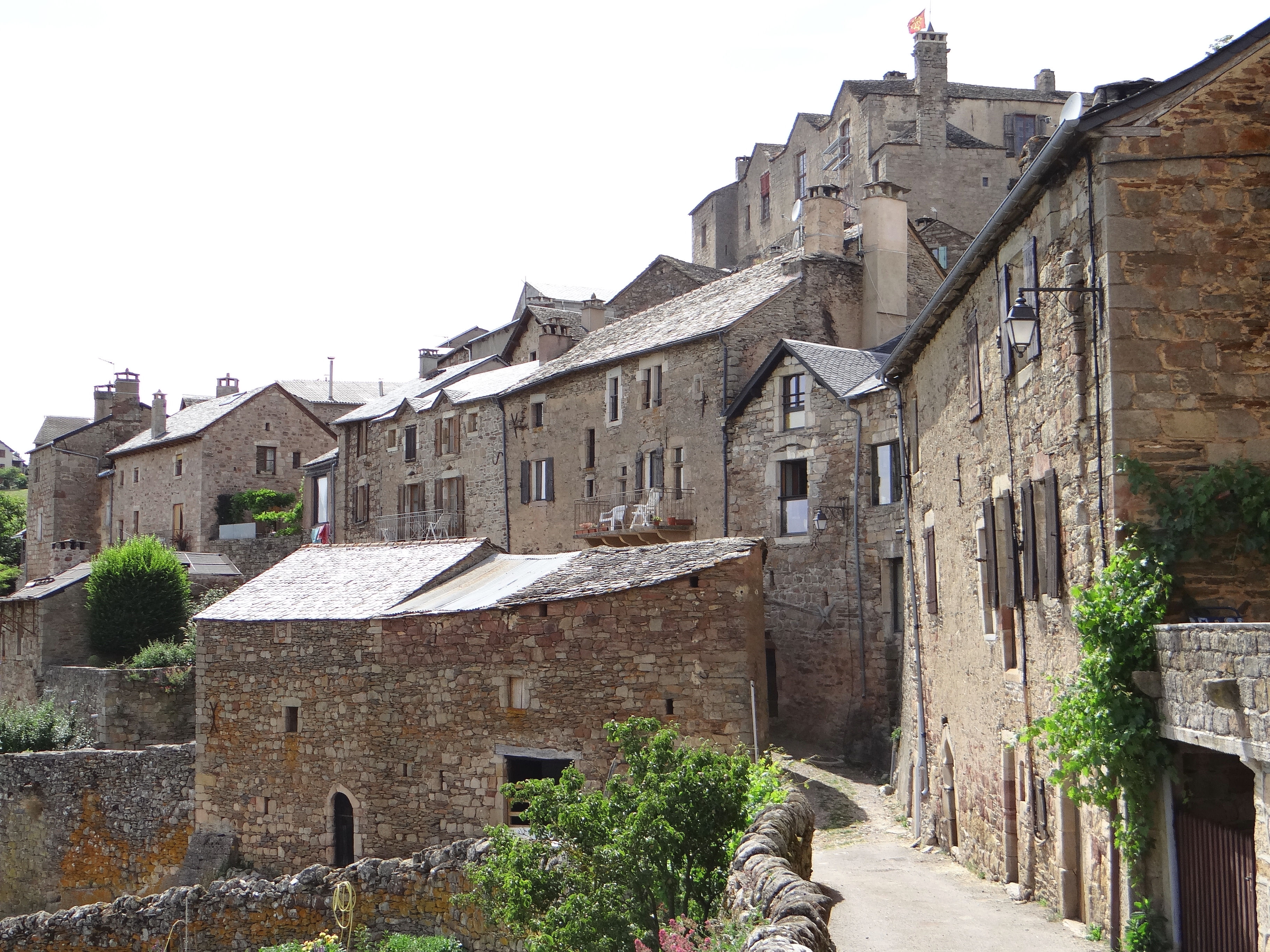

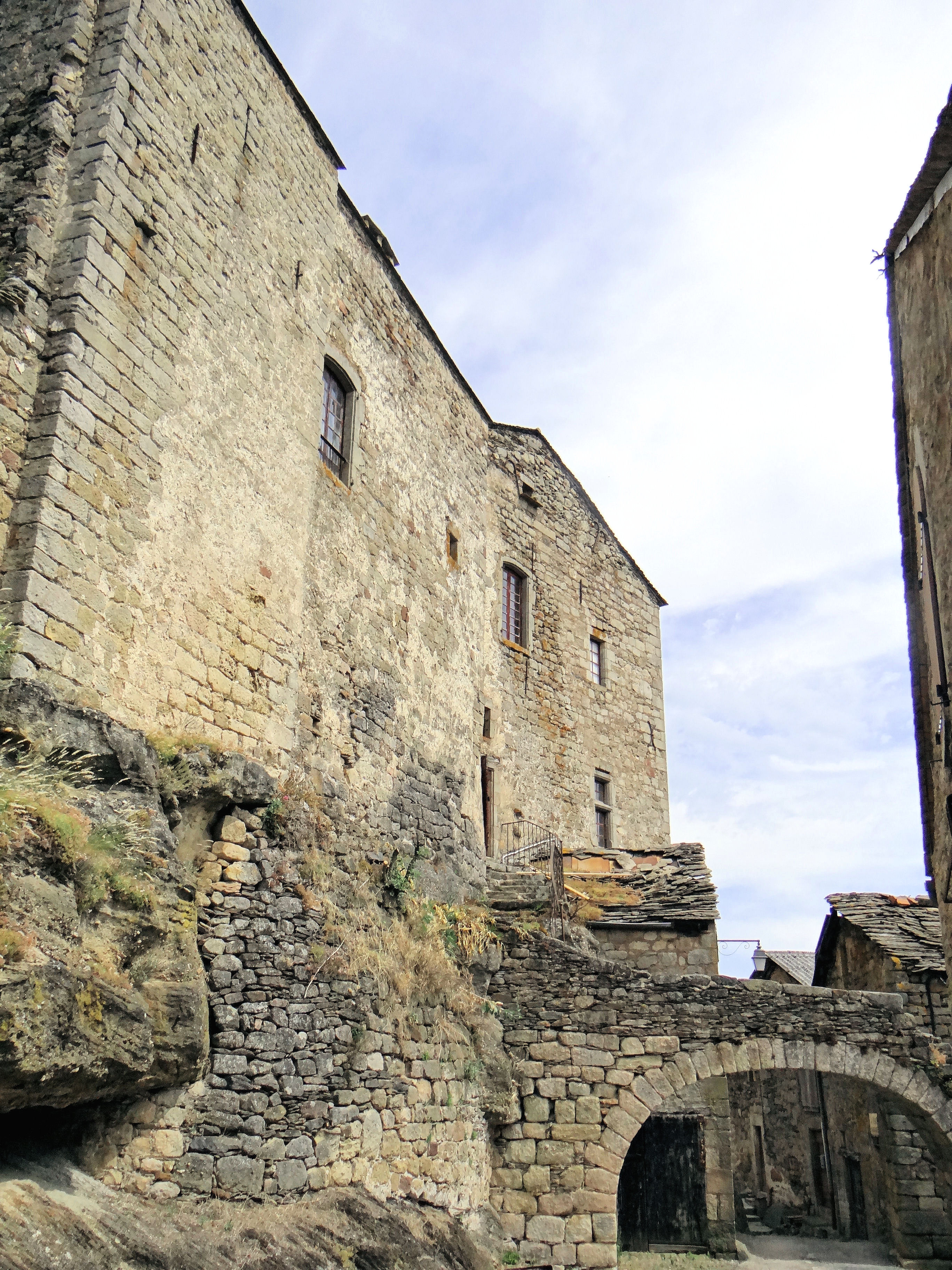

=== Mediaeval watercourse network ===
There exists a lodge (pond)44.13001°N 2.93002°E feeding a cistern in the castle,44.12974°N 2.93242°E from here an underground water course was built leading to three 12th-century chestnut- and walnut-grinding watermills (recorded 1433).44.1303°N 2.93292°E Later four were recorded (1640-1763) but only the location of three 15th-century mills is known 44.1303°N 2.93292°E The conduits led into a developed irrigation system for the neighbouring fields, and for a public toilet. The mills were closed by 1953. The underground aqueduct and parts of the mills are being restored (2014).

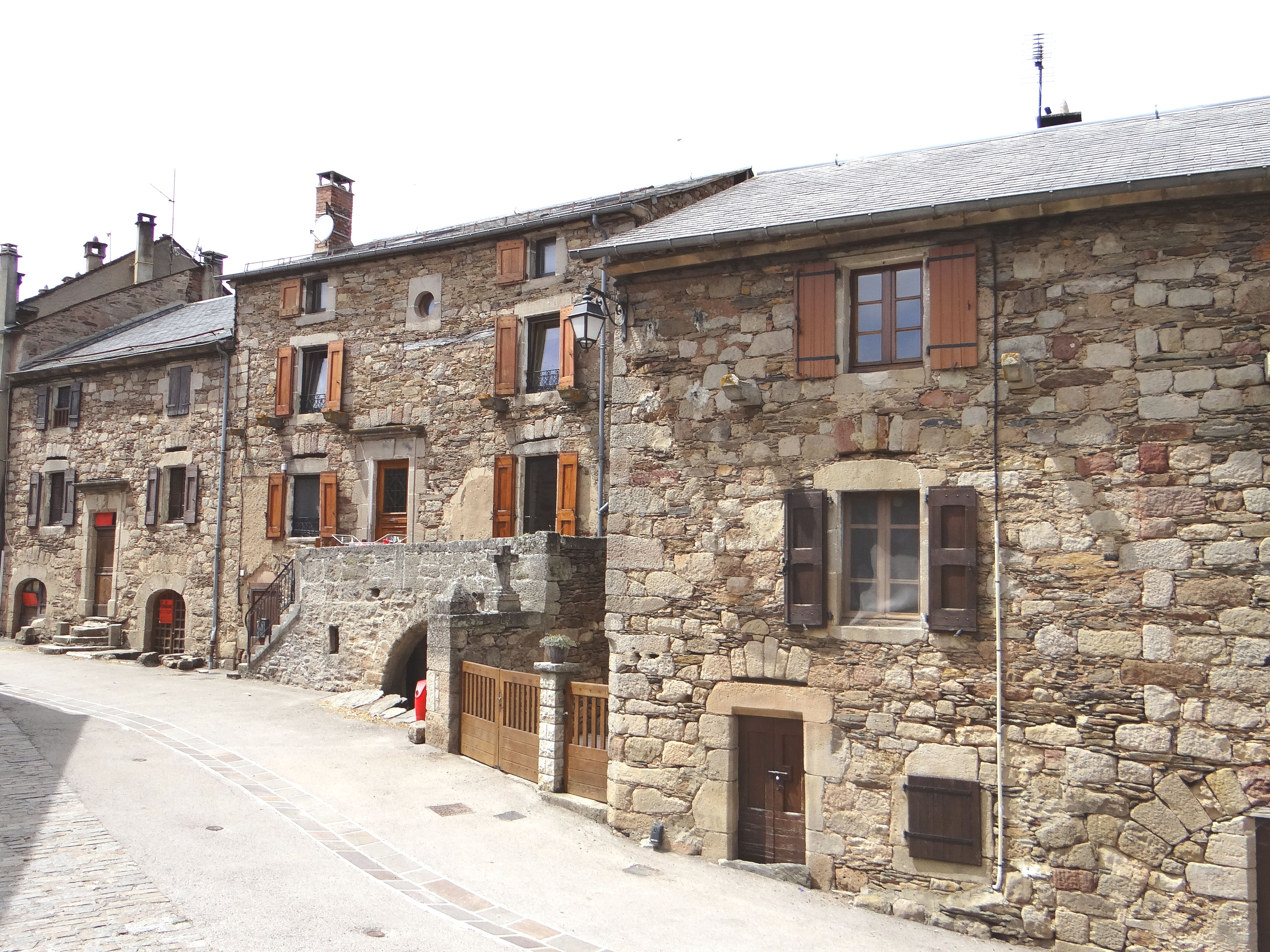

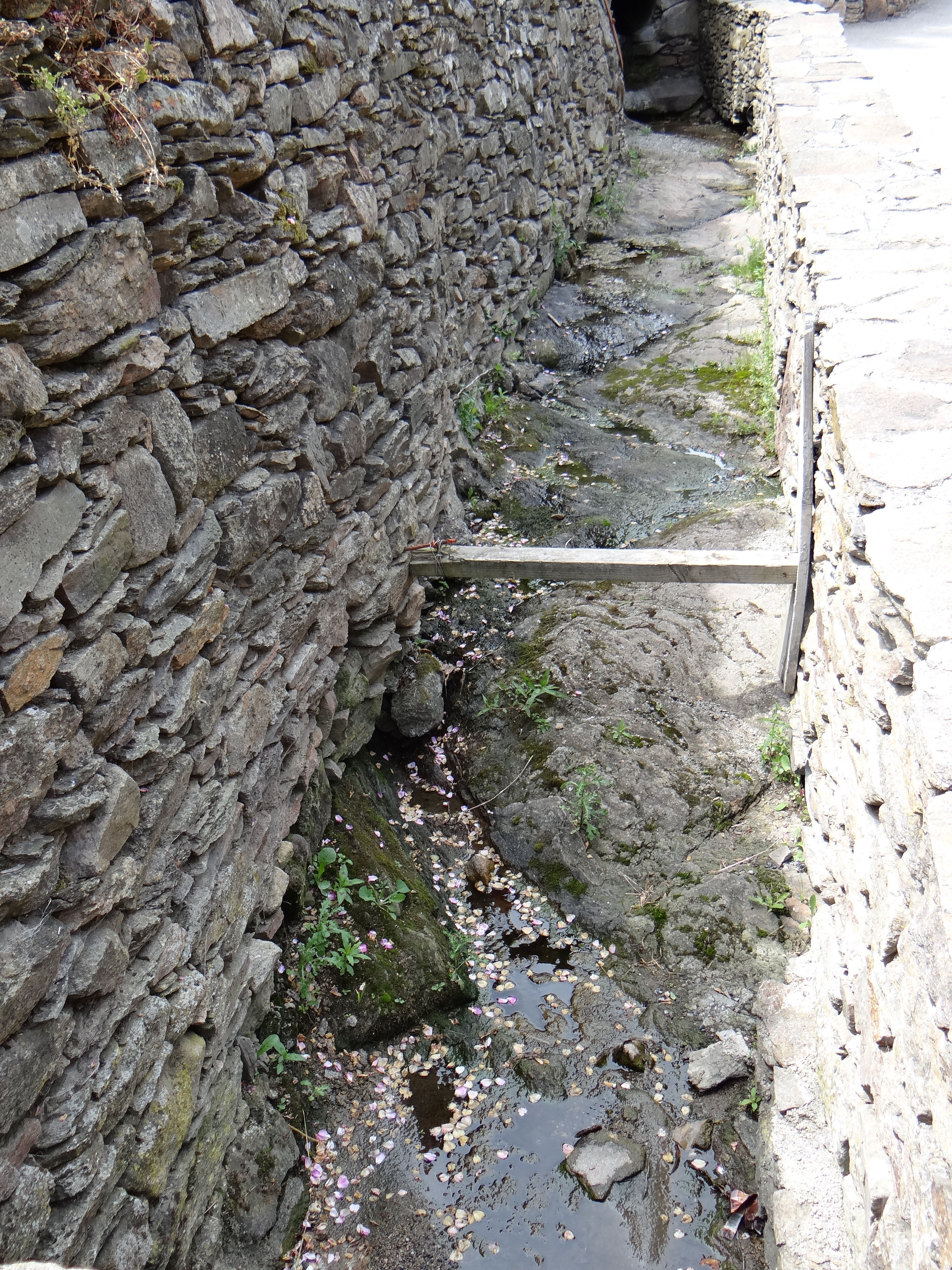

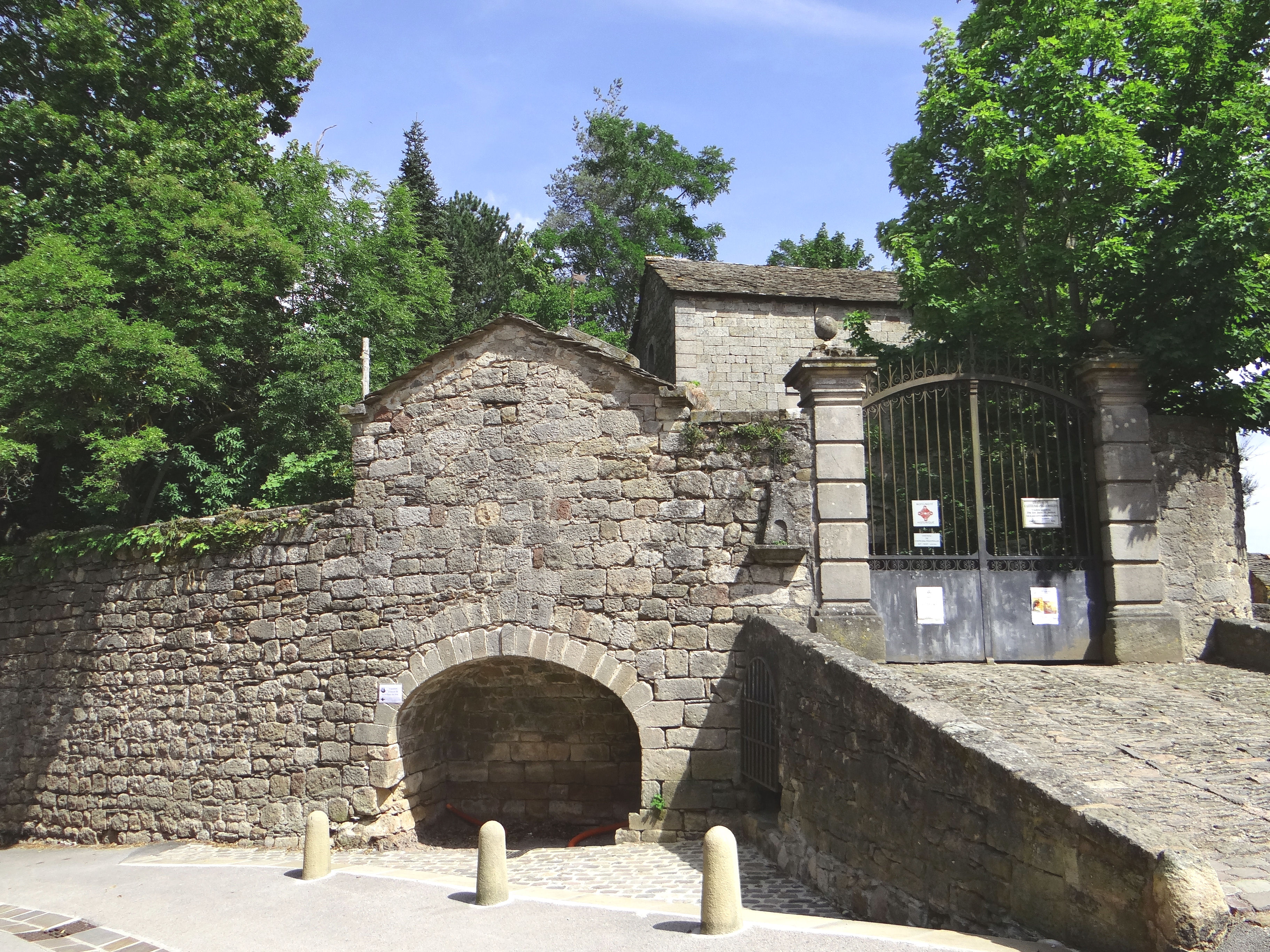

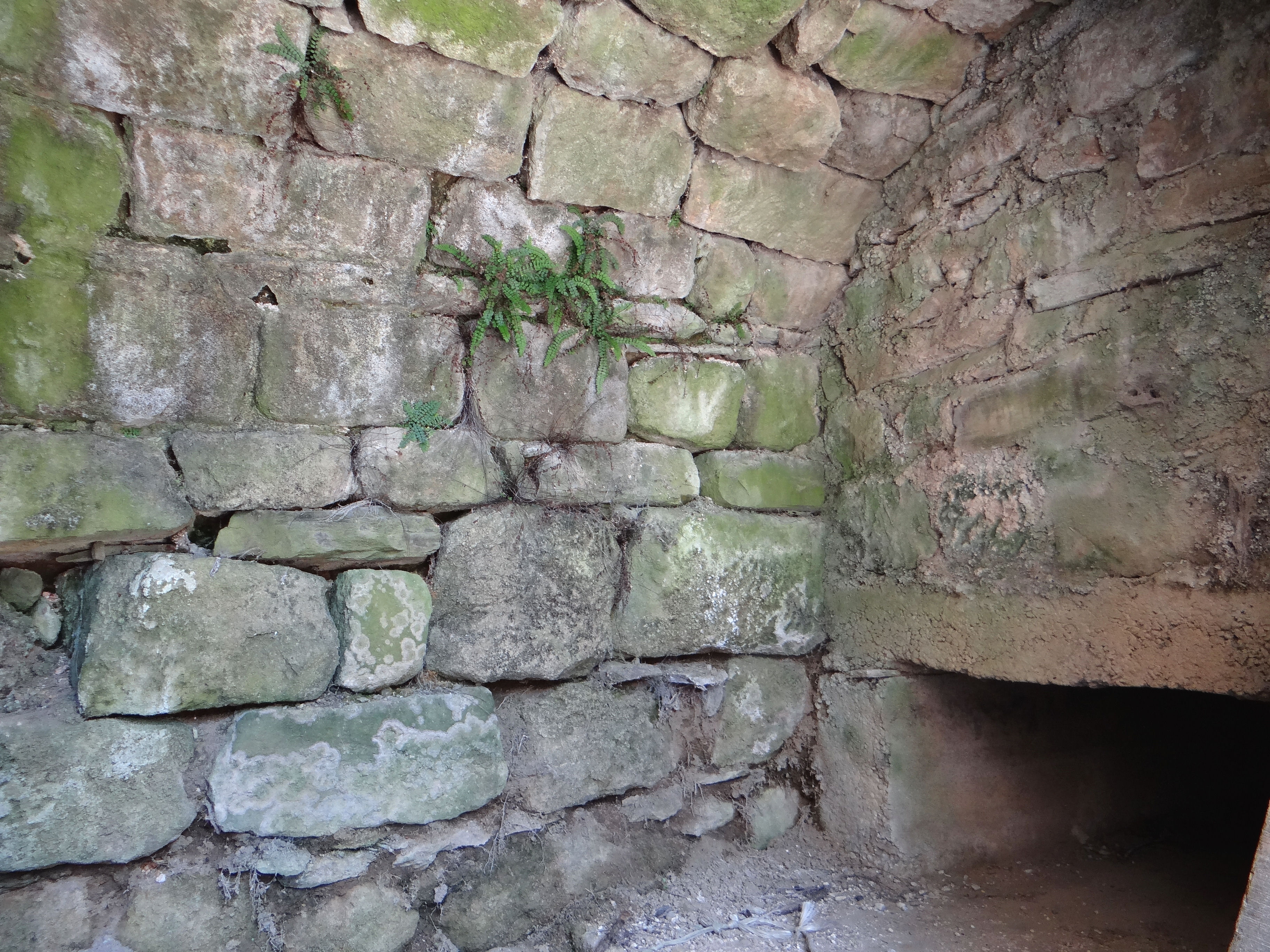

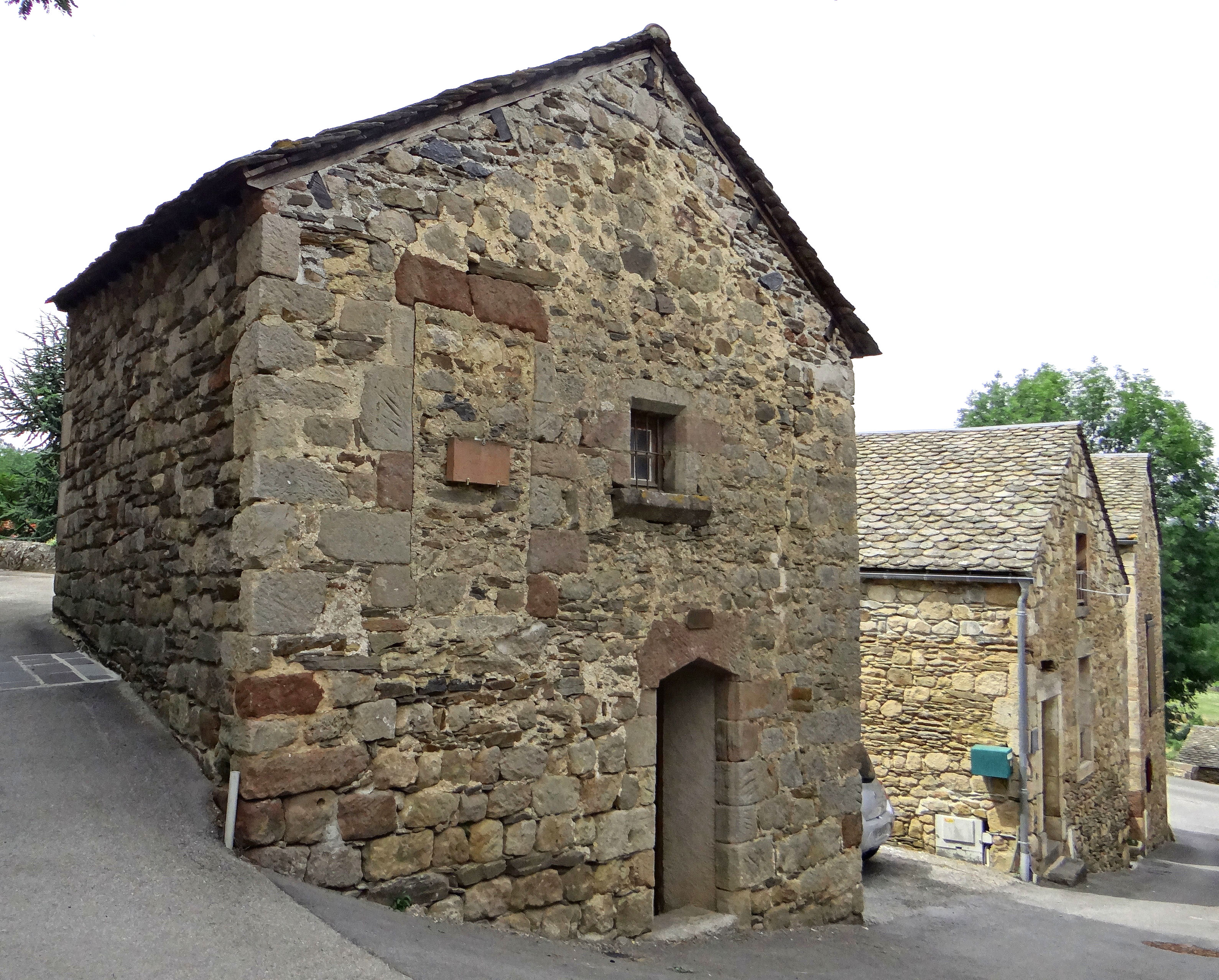

=== Prieuré Saint-Michel ===
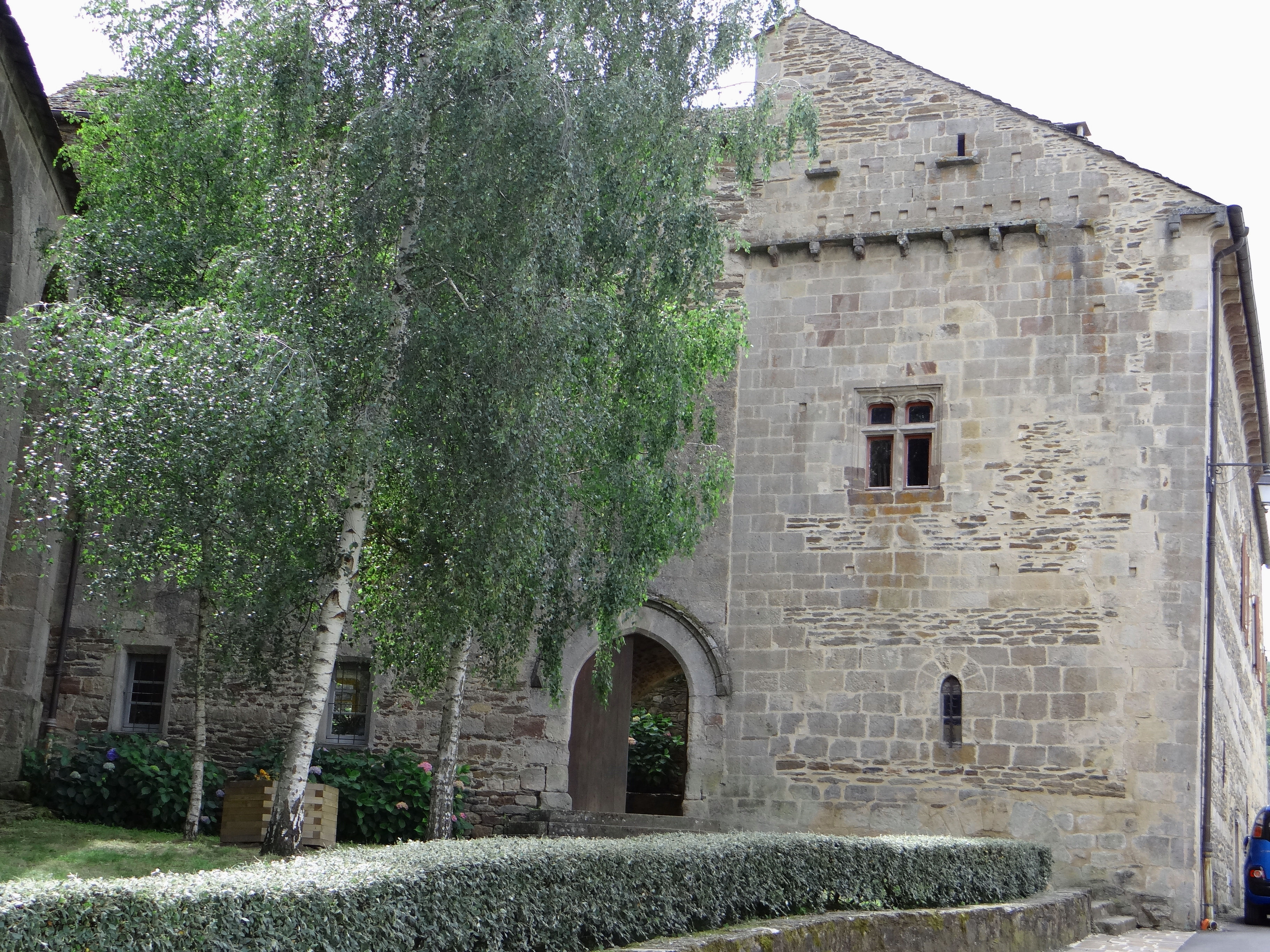

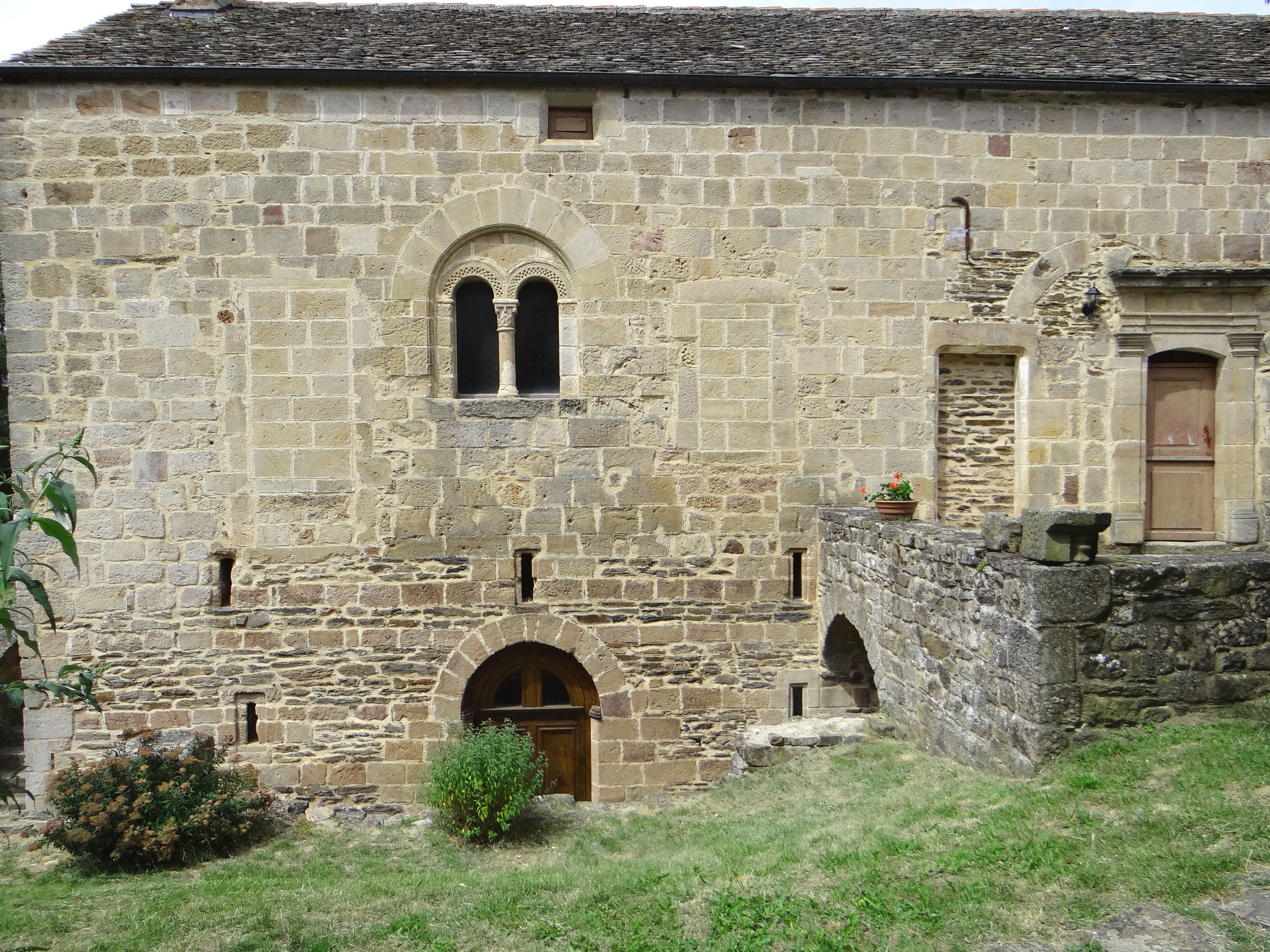

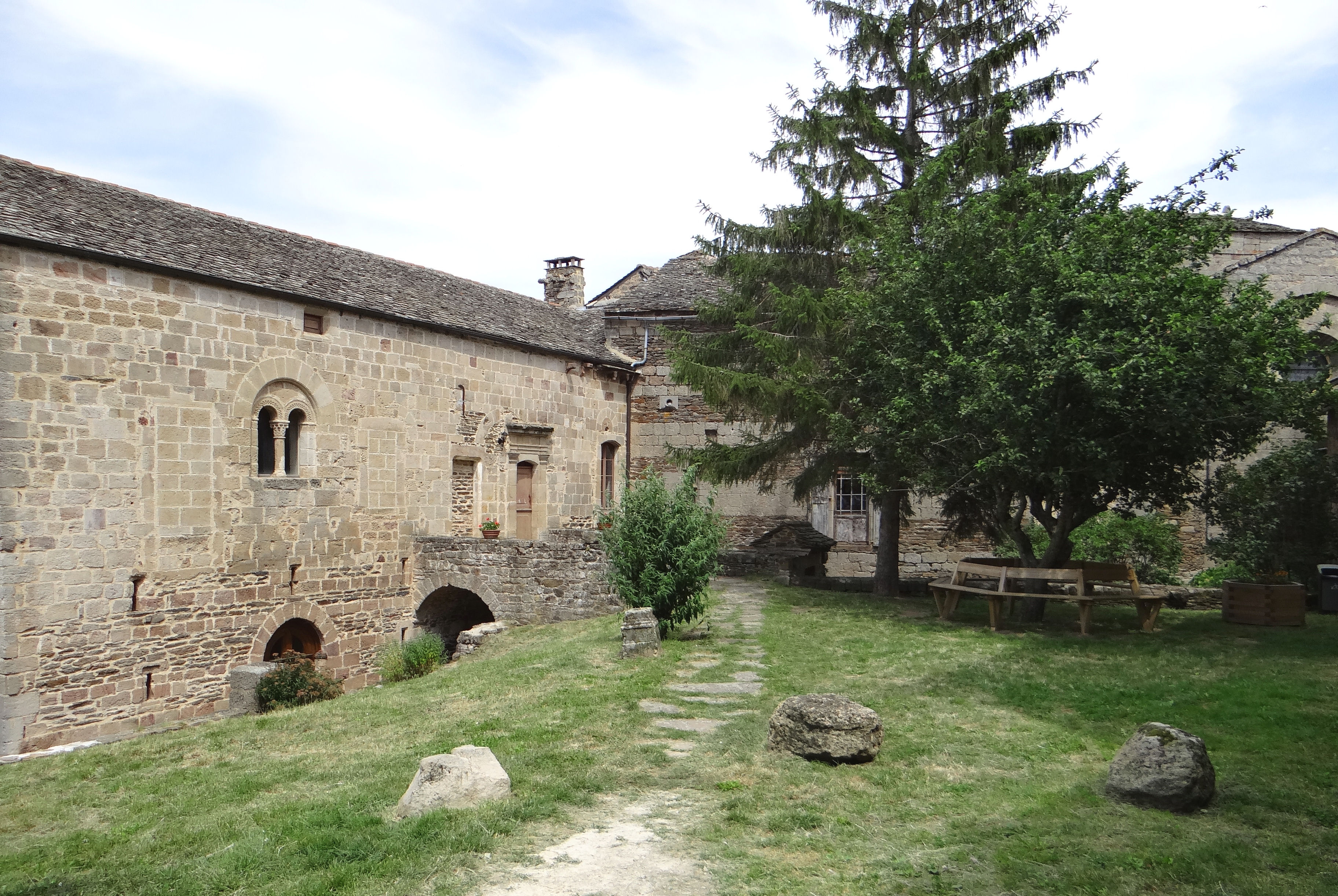

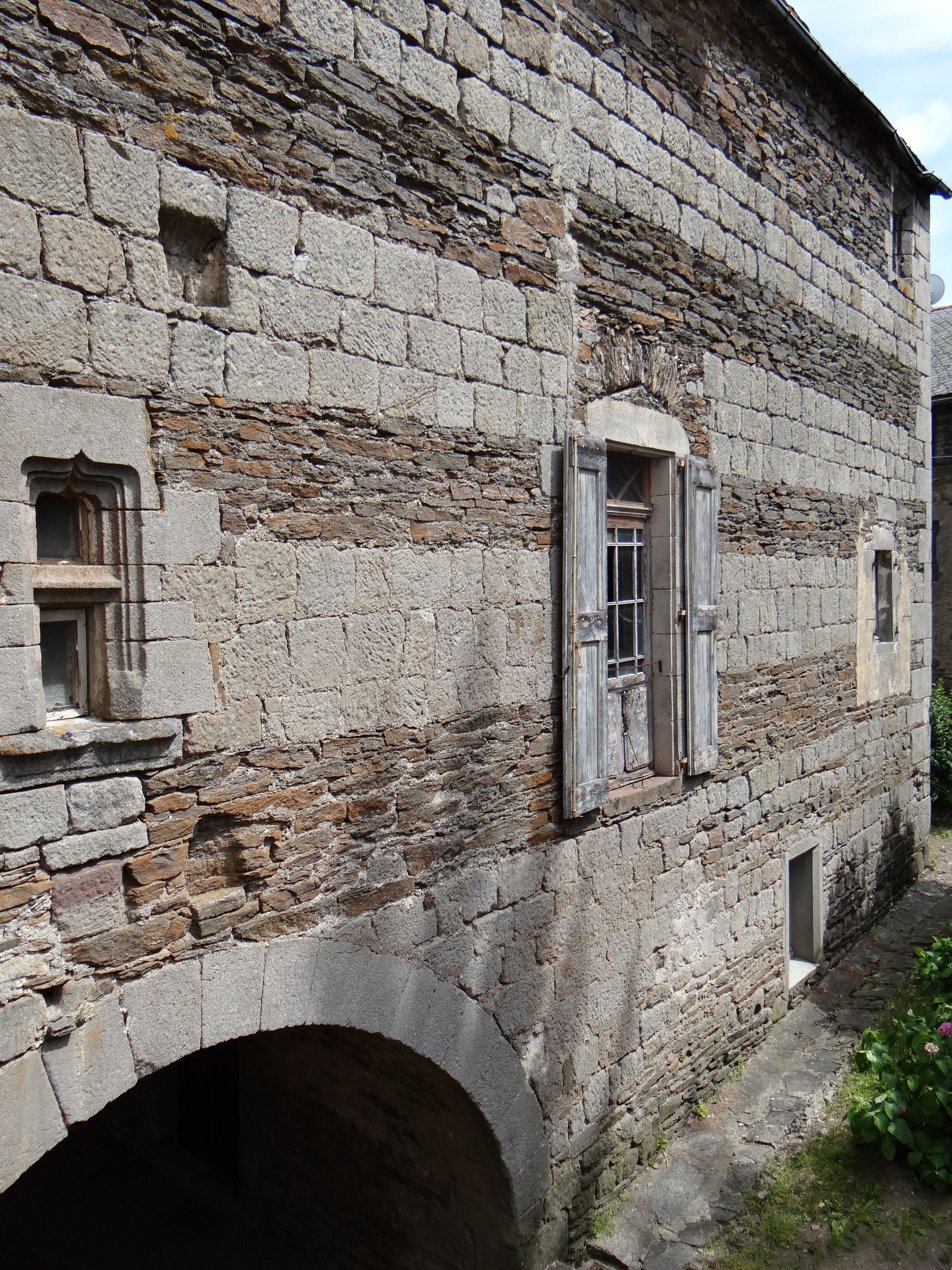

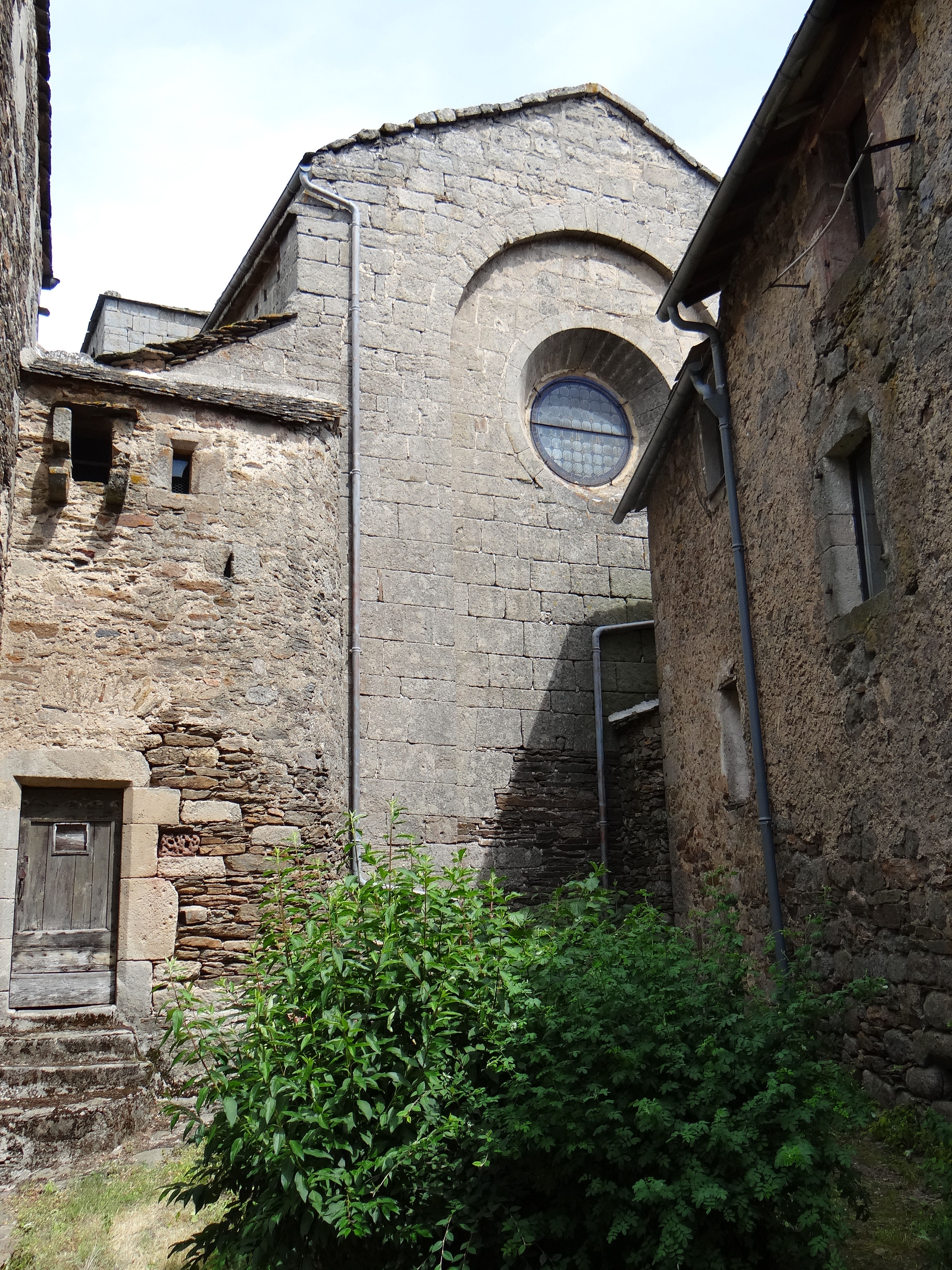

=== Église Saint-Michel ===
The romanesque church built on Caroligien foundations, becoming a priory church in 1070. 44.12996°N 2.93343°E

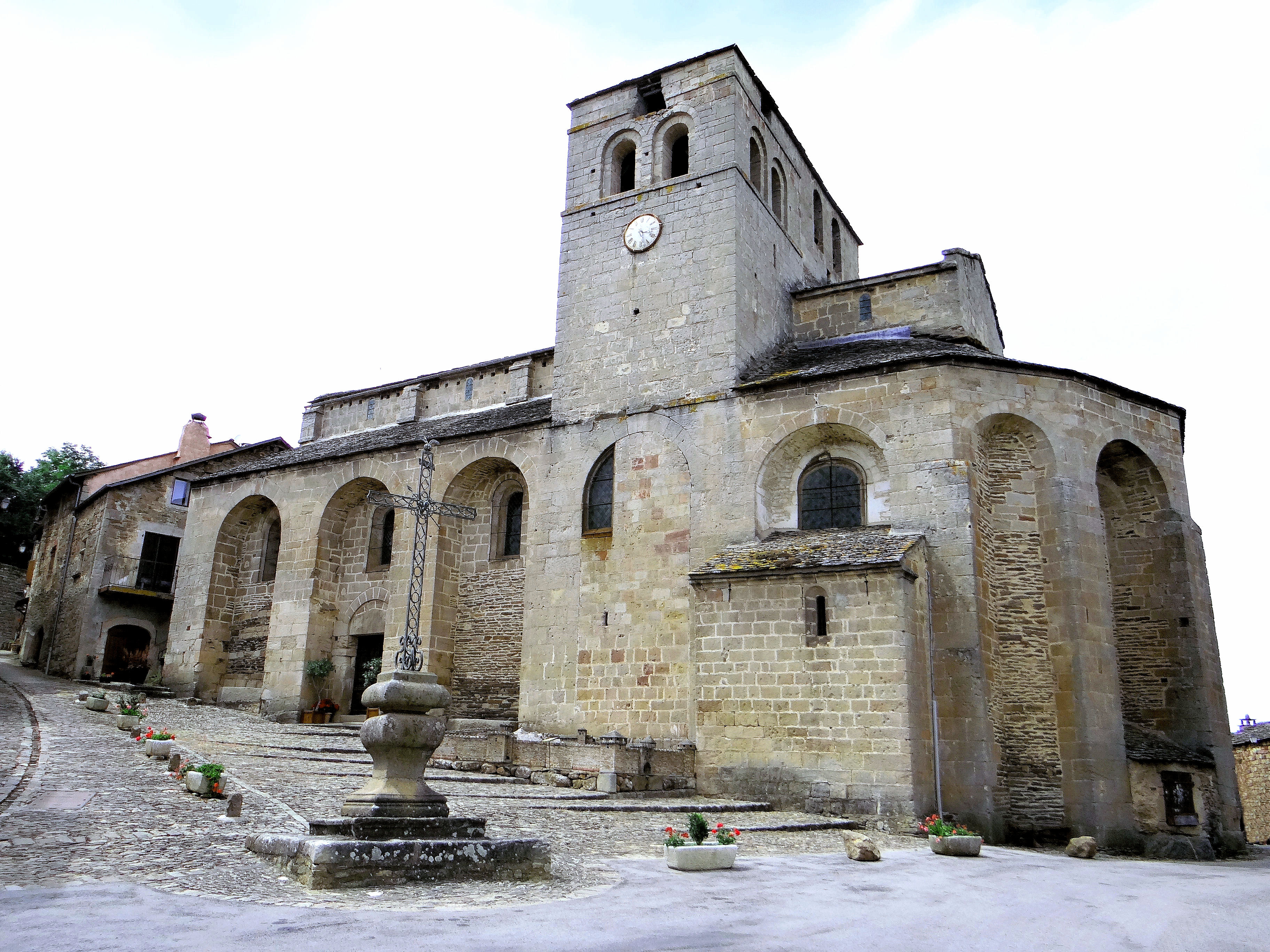

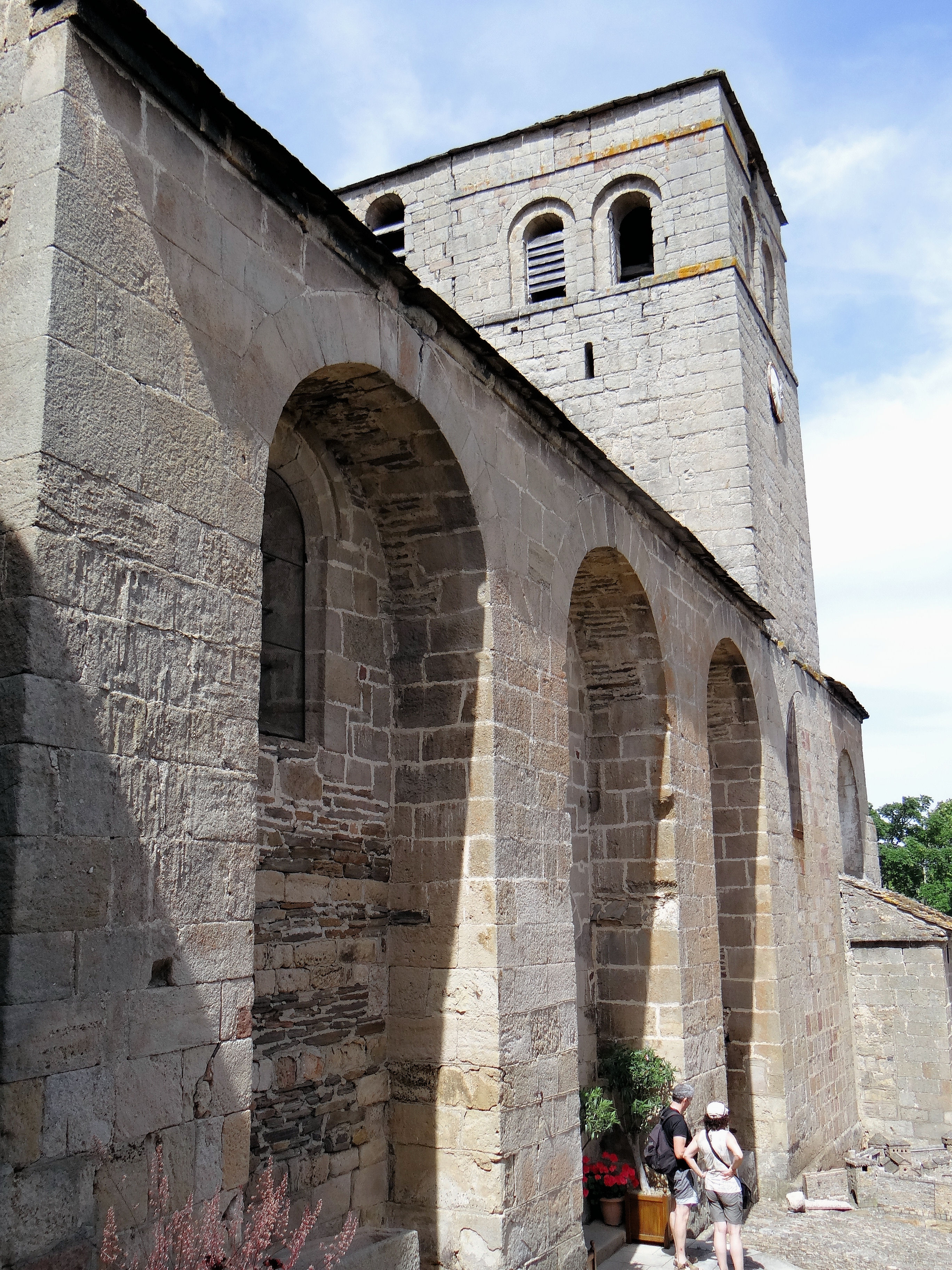

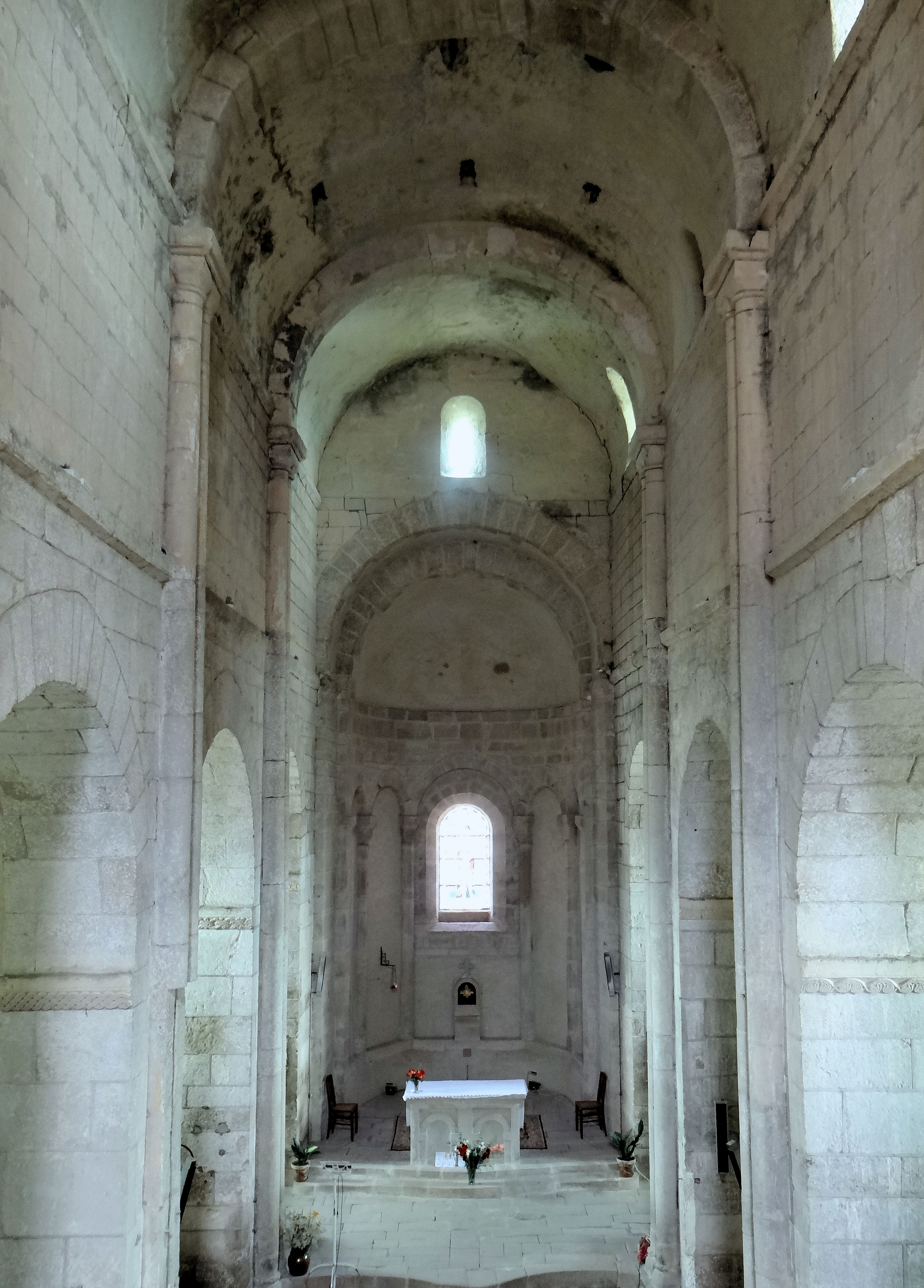

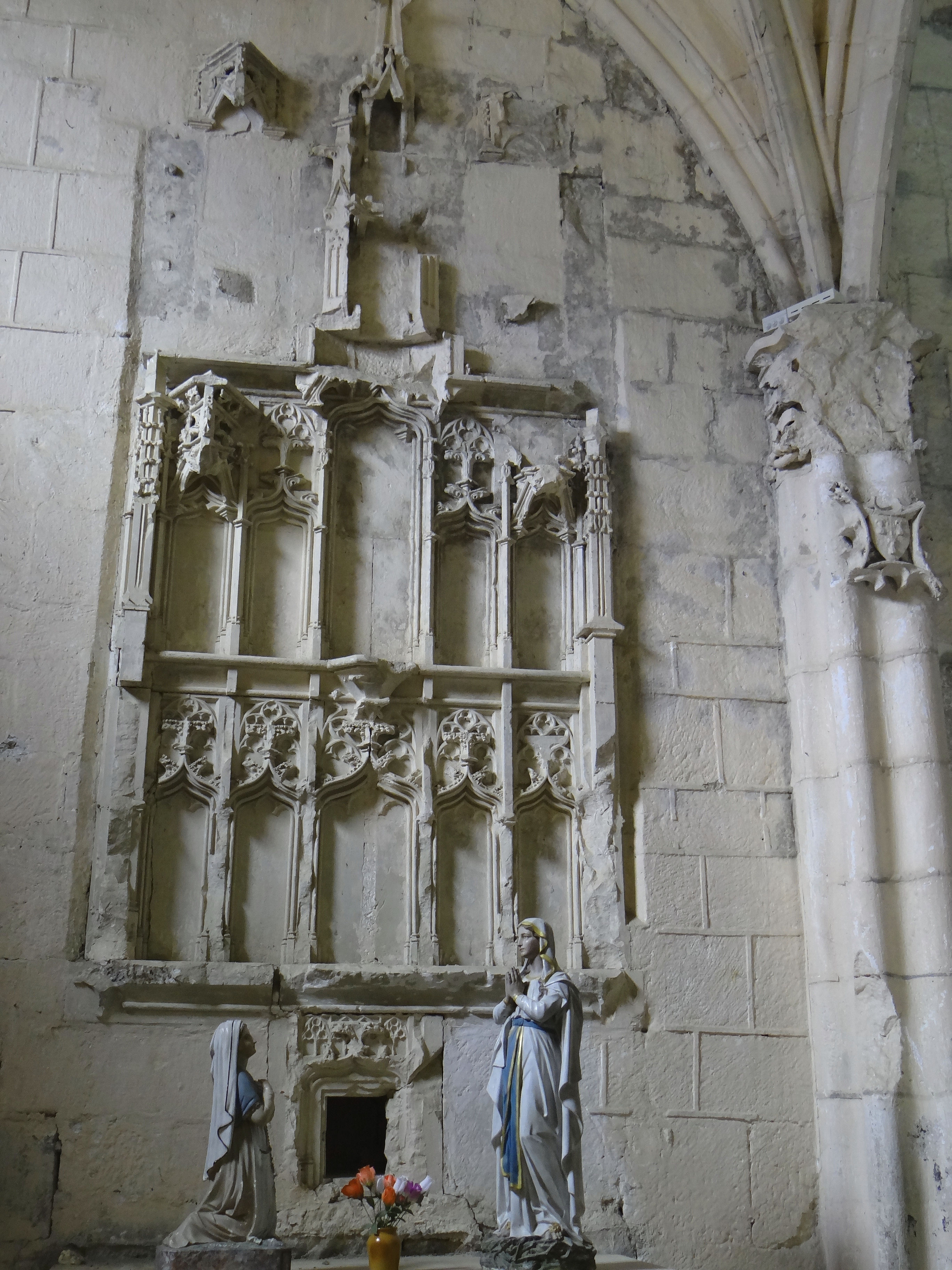

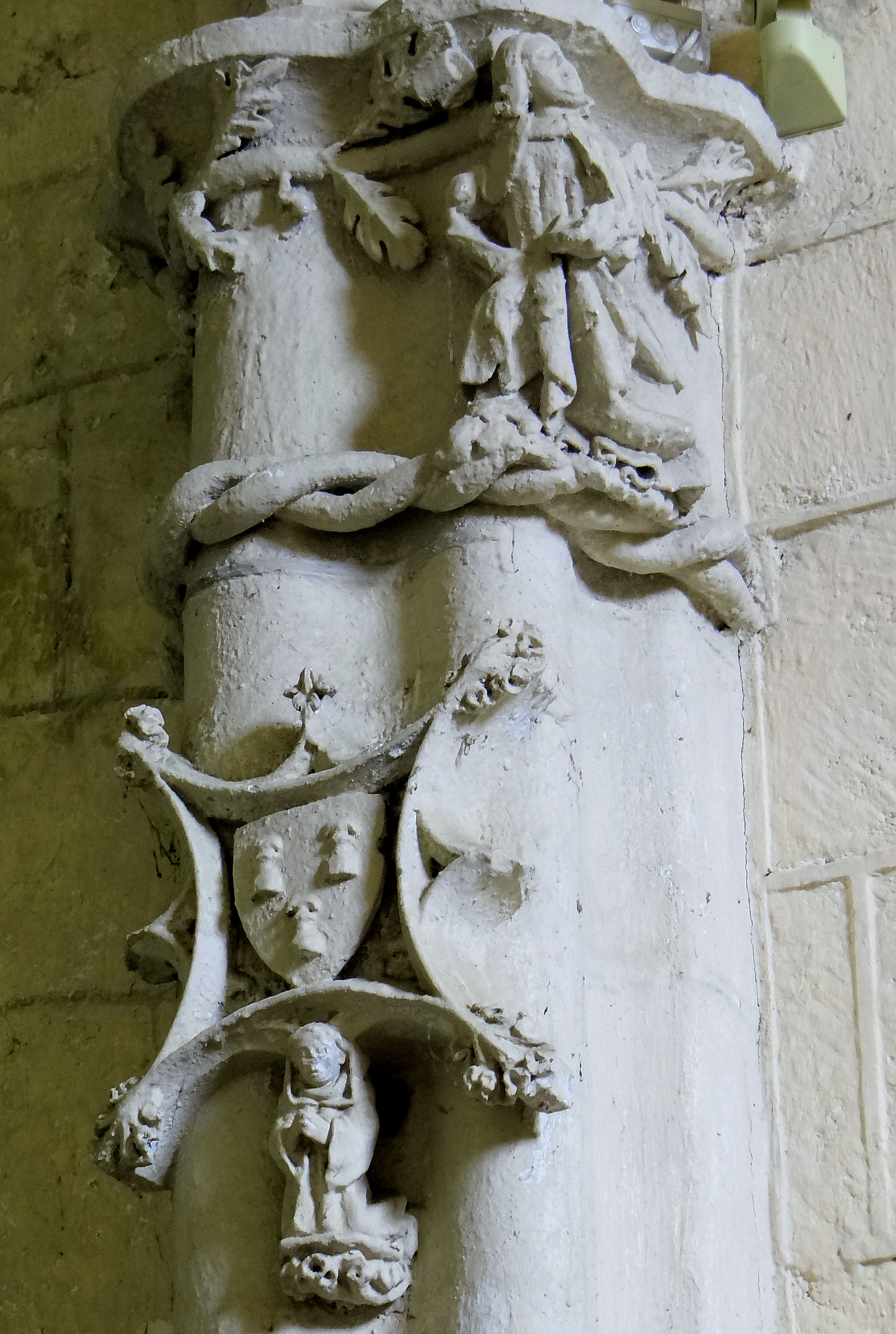

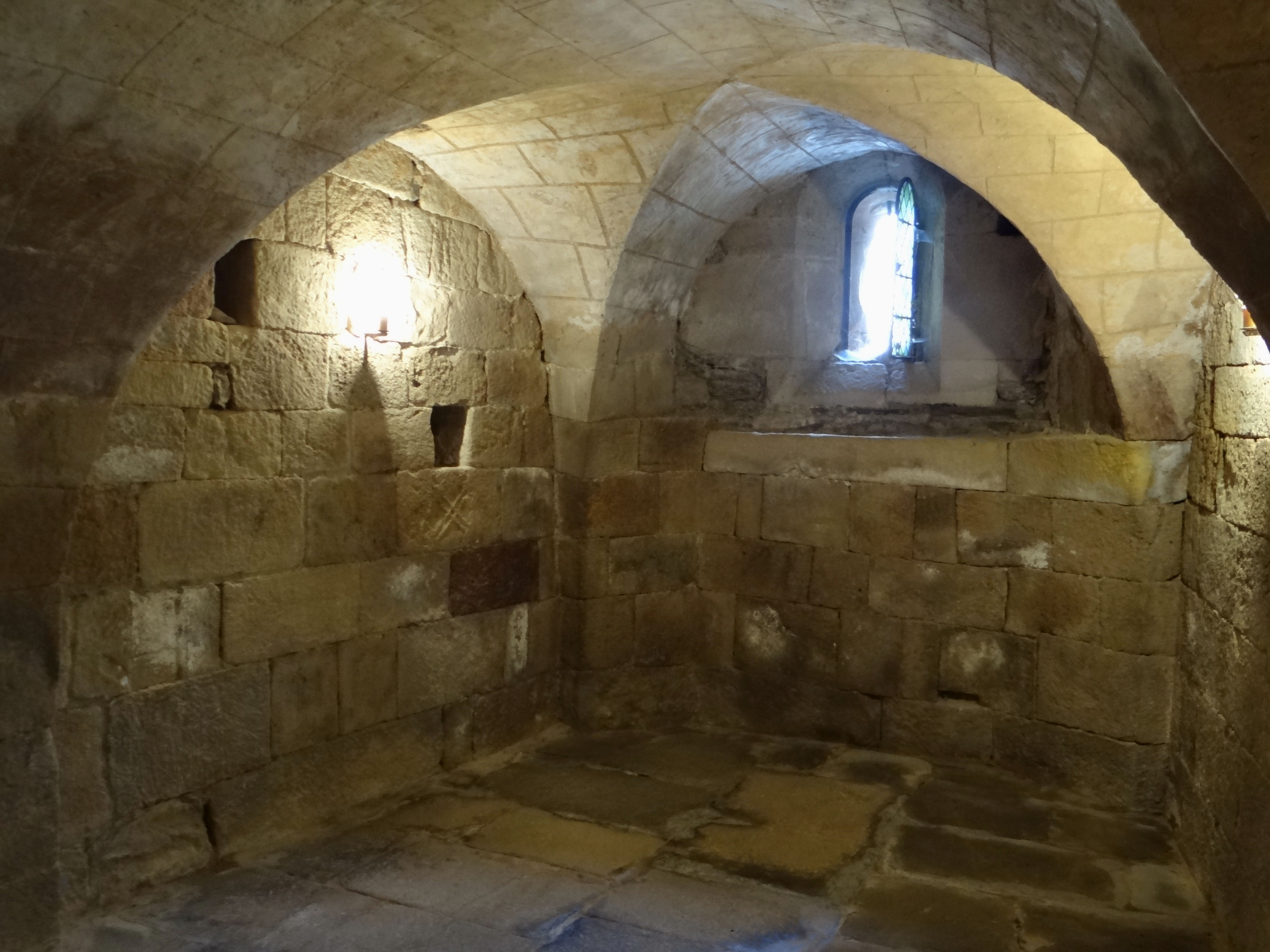

=== Église Notre-Dame ===
This is a Romanesque church from the 12th century. 44.12995°N 2.93482°E.

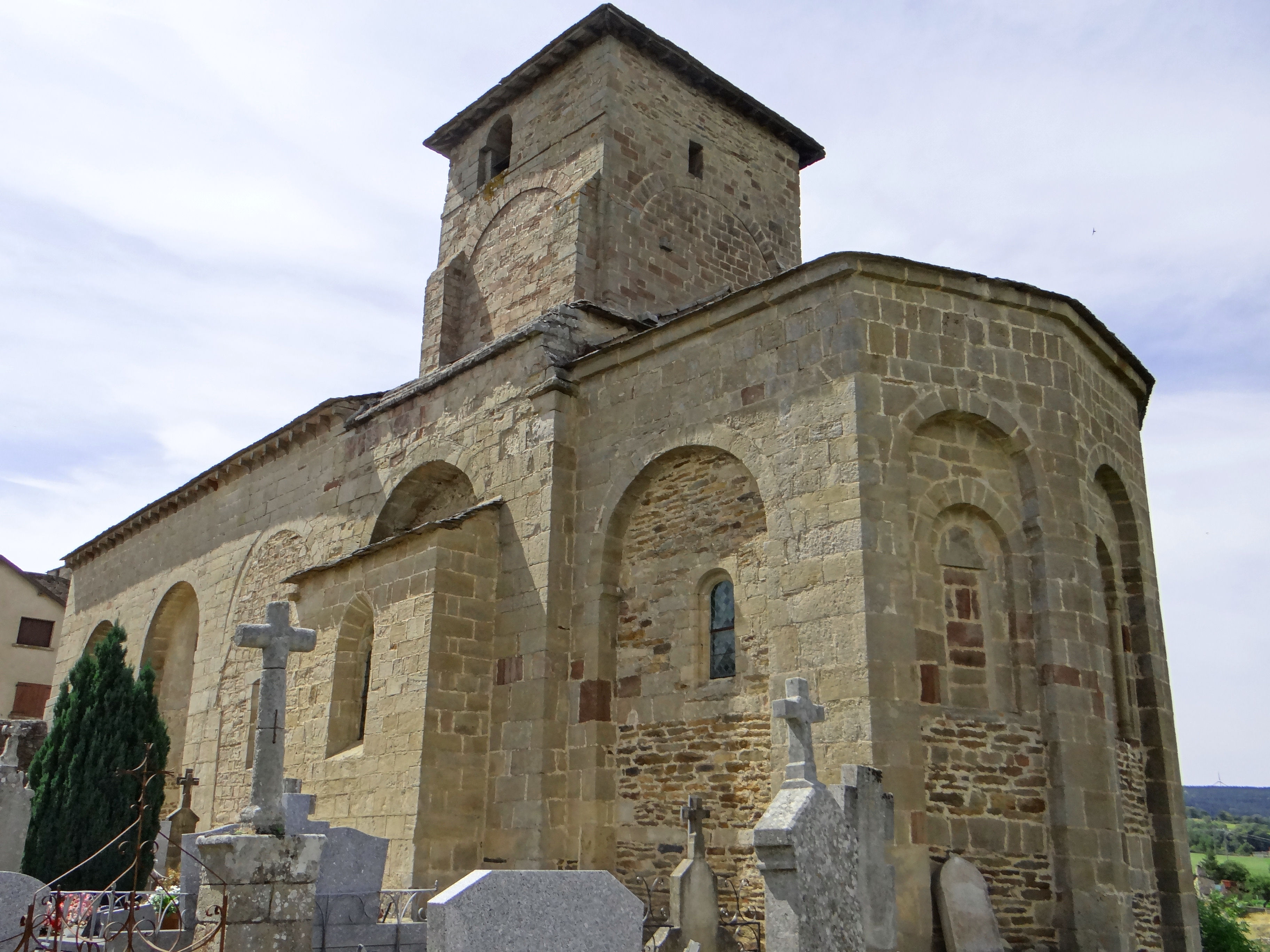

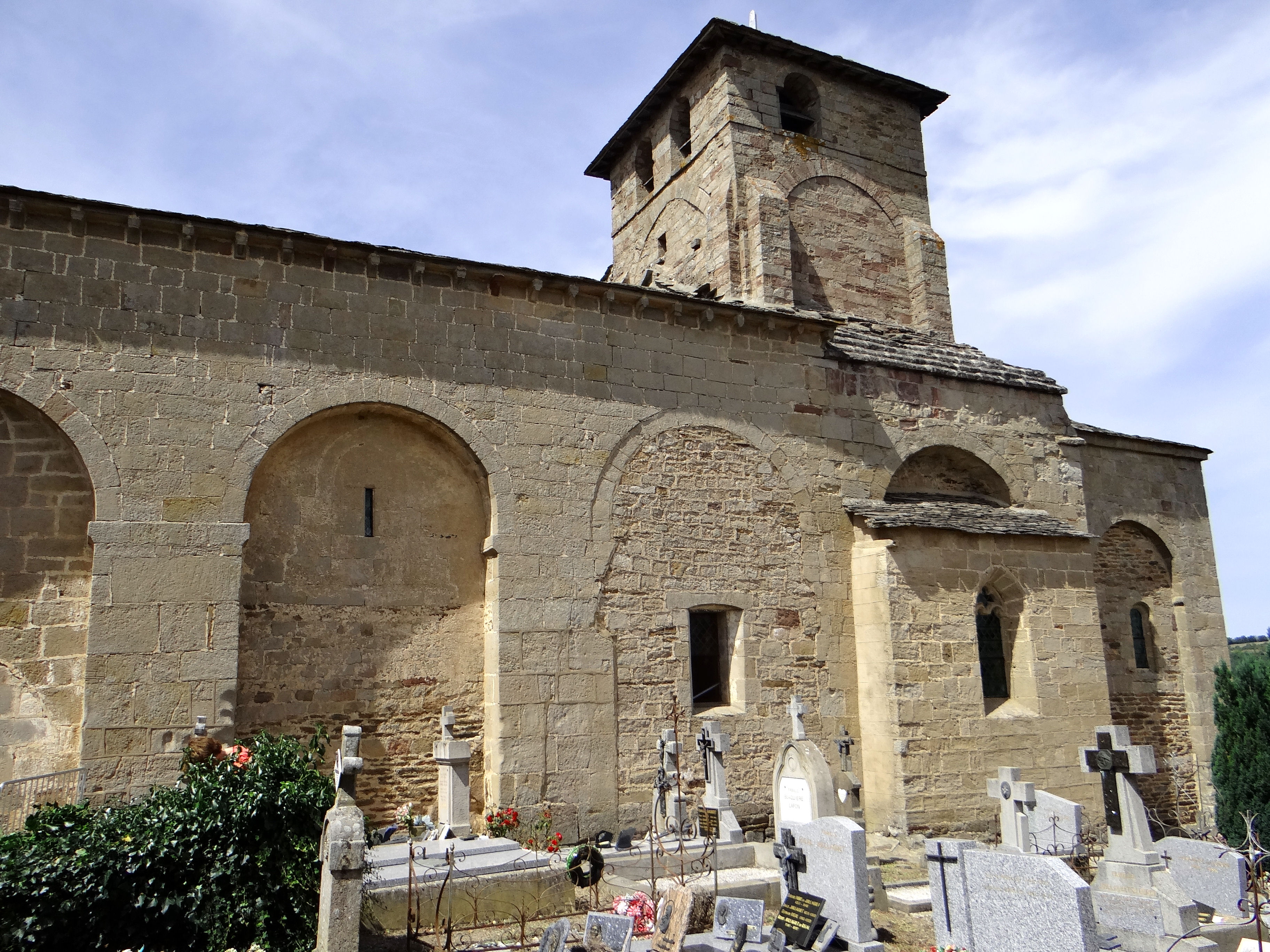

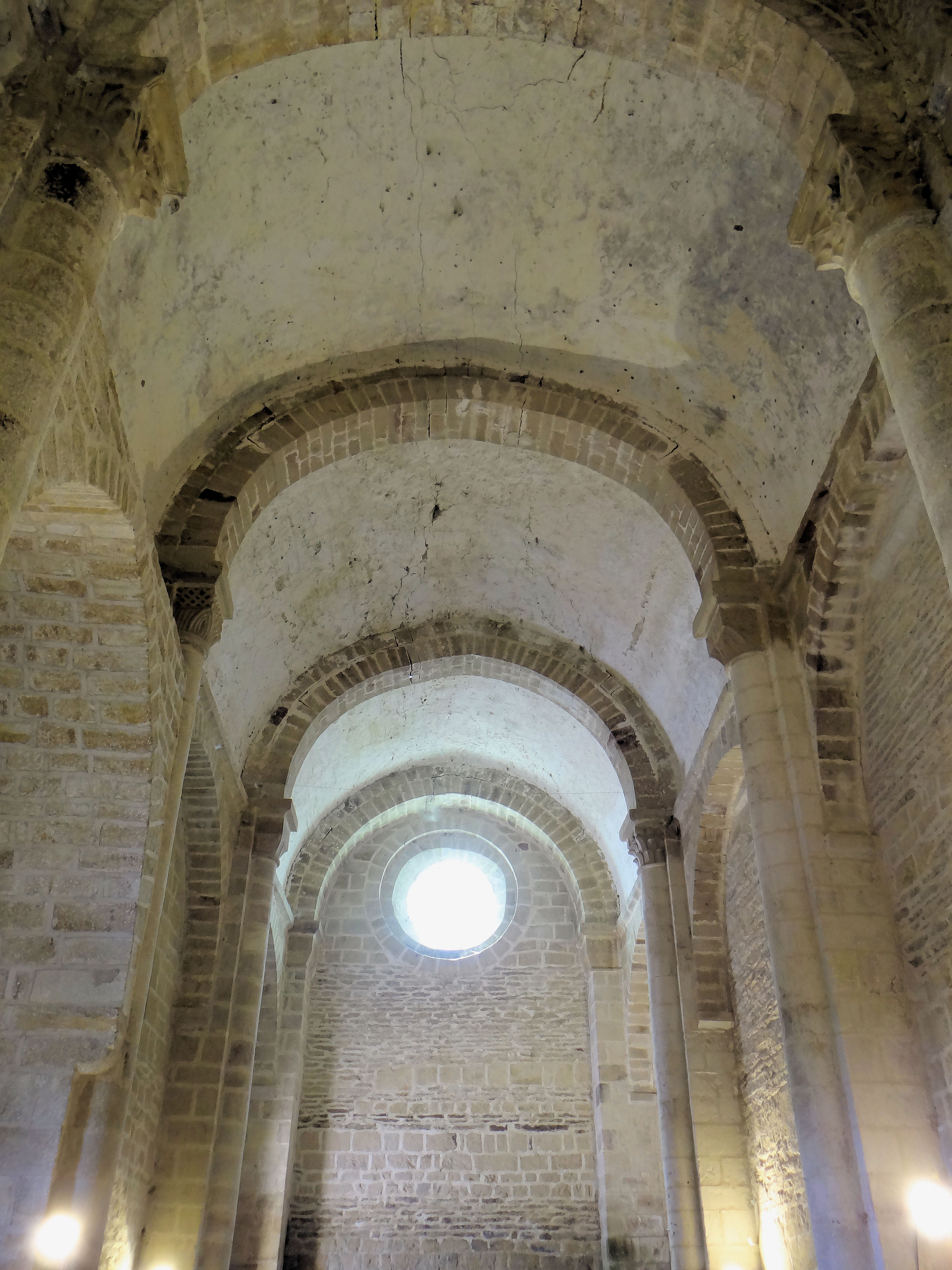

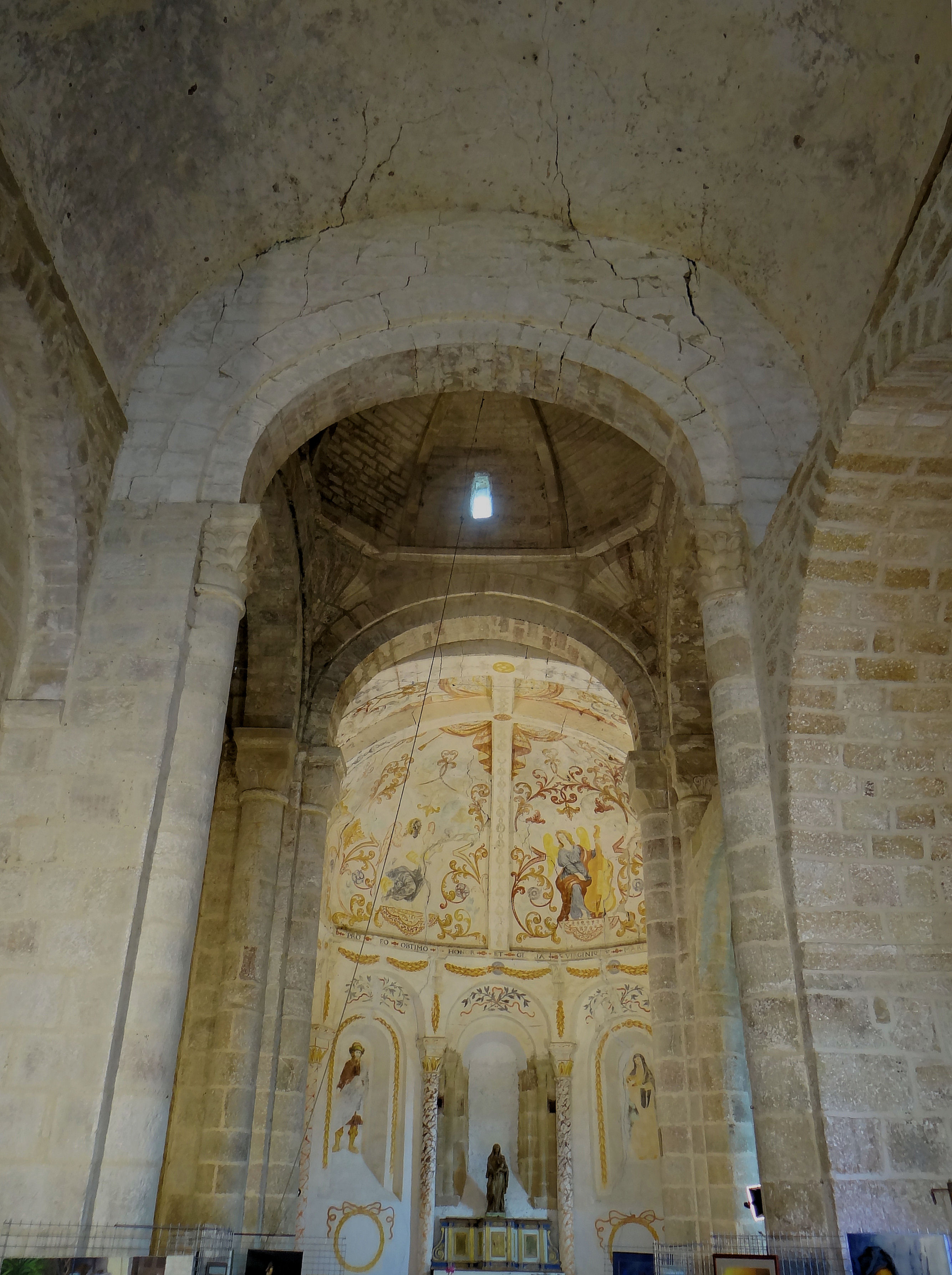

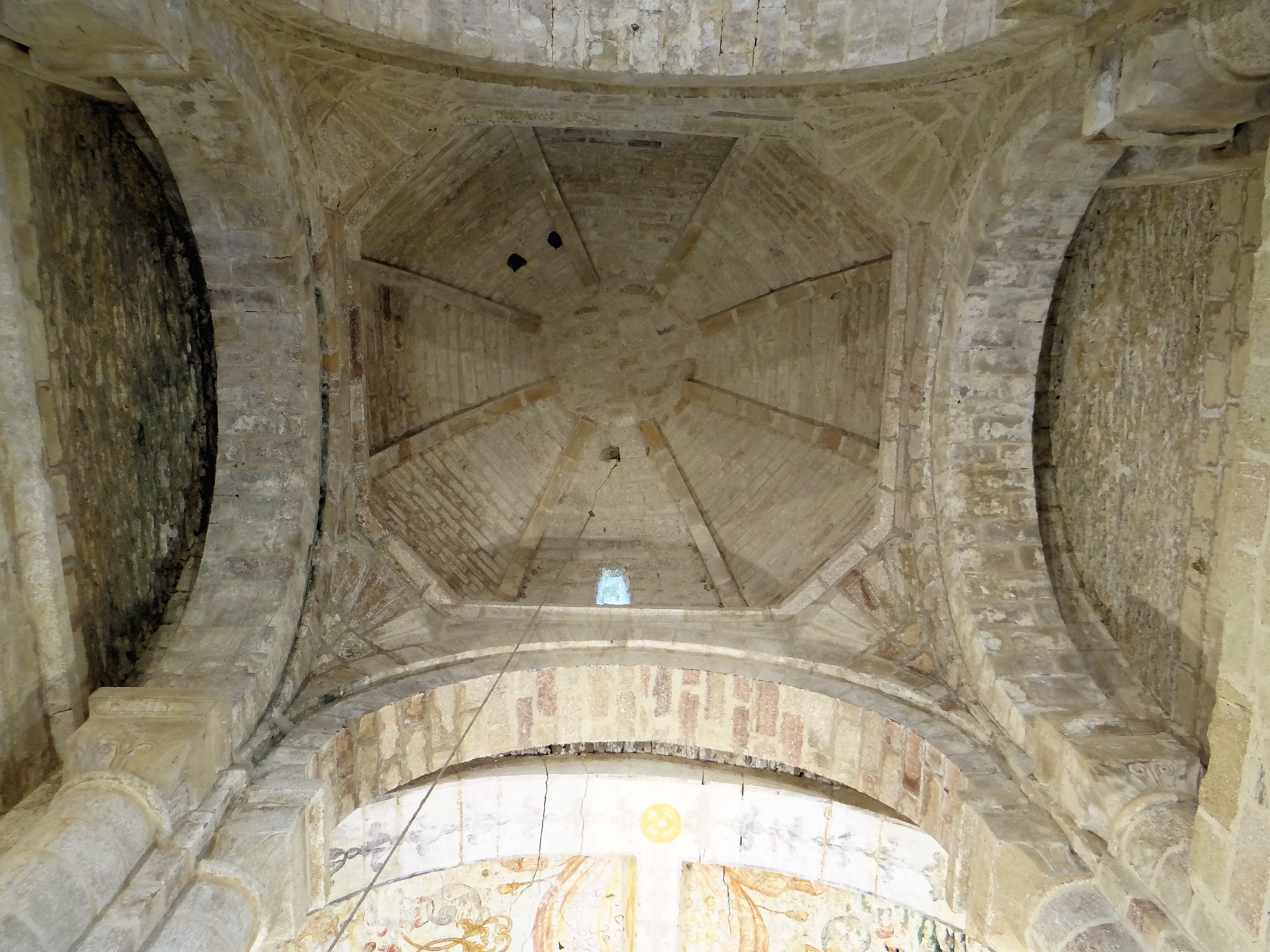

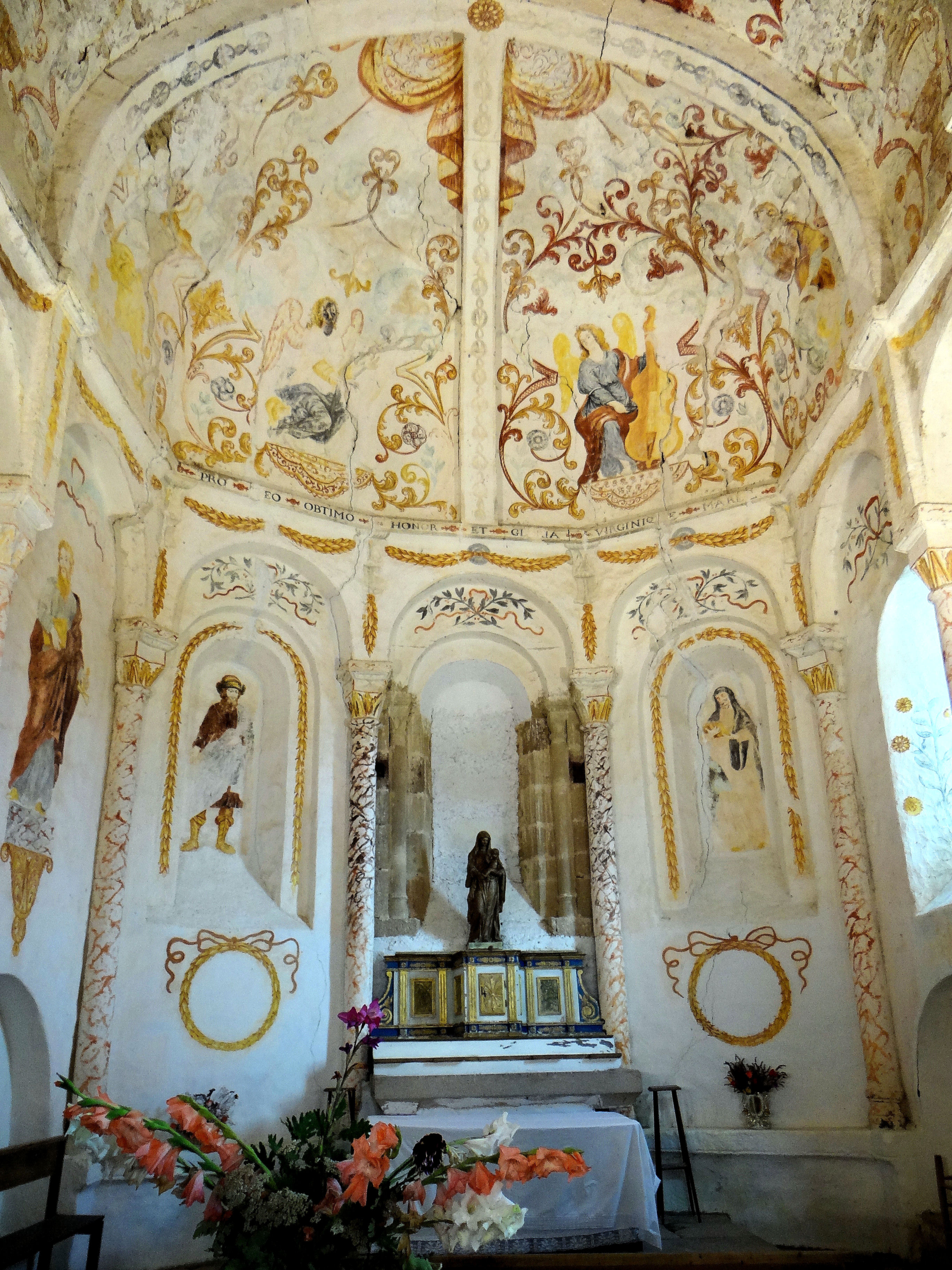

== Population ==
Historical population
| Year | Pop. | ±% p.a. |
|---|---|---|
| 1968 | 428 | — |
| 1975 | 334 | −3.48% |
| 1982 | 311 | −1.01% |
| 1990 | 295 | −0.66% |
| 1999 | 282 | −0.50% |
| 2007 | 320 | +1.59% |
| 2012 | 342 | +1.34% |
| 2017 | 333 | −0.53% |
| 2023 | 344 | +0.54% |
Source: INSEE

== See also ==
- Communes of the Aveyron department
- Rouergue
