= Prades-Salars =

Commune in Occitanie, France

- Commune
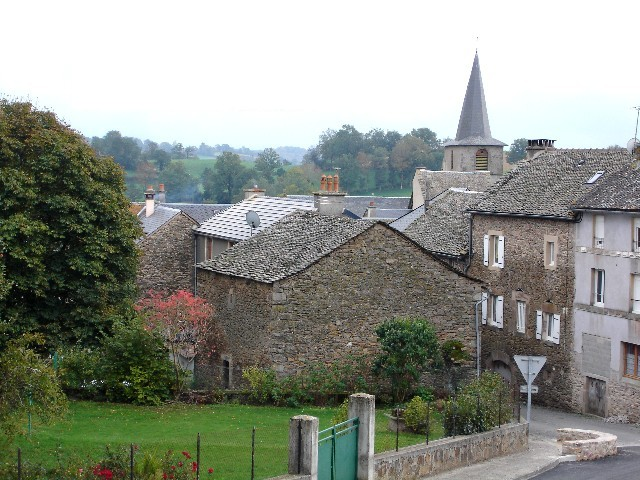
- The church and surrounding buildings in Prades-Salars
- Location of Prades-Salars
- Location within France Location within Occitanie
- Coordinates: 44°15′50″N 2°47′07″E
- Country: France
- Region: Occitania
- Department: Aveyron
- Arrondissement: Millau
- Canton: Raspes et Lévezou
- Intercommunality: Pays de Salars

Government
  - Mayor (2020–2026): Jacques Gardé
- Area^{1}: 30.55 km^{2} (11.80 sq mi)
- Elevation: 800 m (2,600 ft)
- Highest elevation: 984 m (3,228 ft)
- Lowest elevation: 769 m (2,523 ft)
- Population (2023): 311
  - Density: 10.2/km^{2} (26.4/sq mi)
- Time zone: UTC+01:00 (CET)
  - Summer (DST): UTC+02:00 (CEST)
- INSEE/Postal code: 12188 /12290
- ^{1} French Land Register data, which excludes lakes, ponds, glaciers > 1 km^{2} (0.386 sq mi or 247 acres) and river estuaries.

Prades-Salars (French pronunciation: [pʁad salaʁ]; Occitan: Pradas) is a commune in the Aveyron department in southern France.

== Population ==
Historical population
Year	Pop.	±% p.a.
1968	401	—
1975	365	−1.33%
1982	316	−2.04%
1990	320	+0.16%
1999	293	−0.97%
2007	285	−0.35%
2012	272	−0.93%
2017	309	+2.58%
2023	311	+0.11%
Source: INSEE

== See also ==
- Communes of the Aveyron department
