= Curan =

Commune in Occitanie, France

- Commune
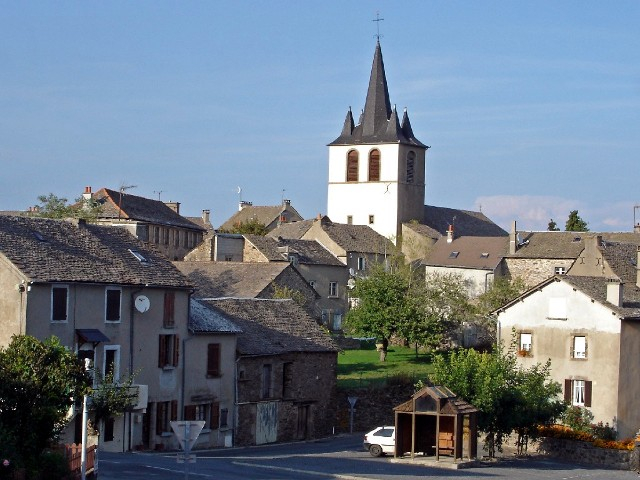
- The church and surrounding buildings in Curan

- Coat of arms
- Location of Curan
- Location within France Location within Occitanie
- Coordinates: 44°12′03″N 2°51′17″E
- Country: France
- Region: Occitania
- Department: Aveyron
- Arrondissement: Millau
- Canton: Raspes et Lévezou

Government
  - Mayor (2020–2026): Jean-Louis Grimal
- Area^{1}: 41.18 km^{2} (15.90 sq mi)
- Elevation: 950 m (3,120 ft)
- Highest elevation: 1,062 m (3,484 ft)
- Lowest elevation: 804 m (2,638 ft)
- Population (2023): 307
  - Density: 7.46/km^{2} (19.3/sq mi)
- Time zone: UTC+01:00 (CET)
  - Summer (DST): UTC+02:00 (CEST)
- INSEE/Postal code: 12307 /12410
- ^{1} French Land Register data, which excludes lakes, ponds, glaciers > 1 km^{2} (0.386 sq mi or 247 acres) and river estuaries.

Curan (French pronunciation: [kyʁɑ̃]; Occitan: Curanh) is a commune in the Aveyron department in southern France.

== Population ==
Historical population
Year	Pop.	±% p.a.
1968	510	—
1975	439	−2.12%
1982	408	−1.04%
1990	357	−1.66%
1999	302	−1.84%
2007	302	+0.00%
2012	317	+0.97%
2017	302	−0.96%
2023	307	+0.27%
Source: INSEE

== See also ==
- Communes of the Aveyron department
