= Le Vibal =

Commune in Occitanie, France

- Commune
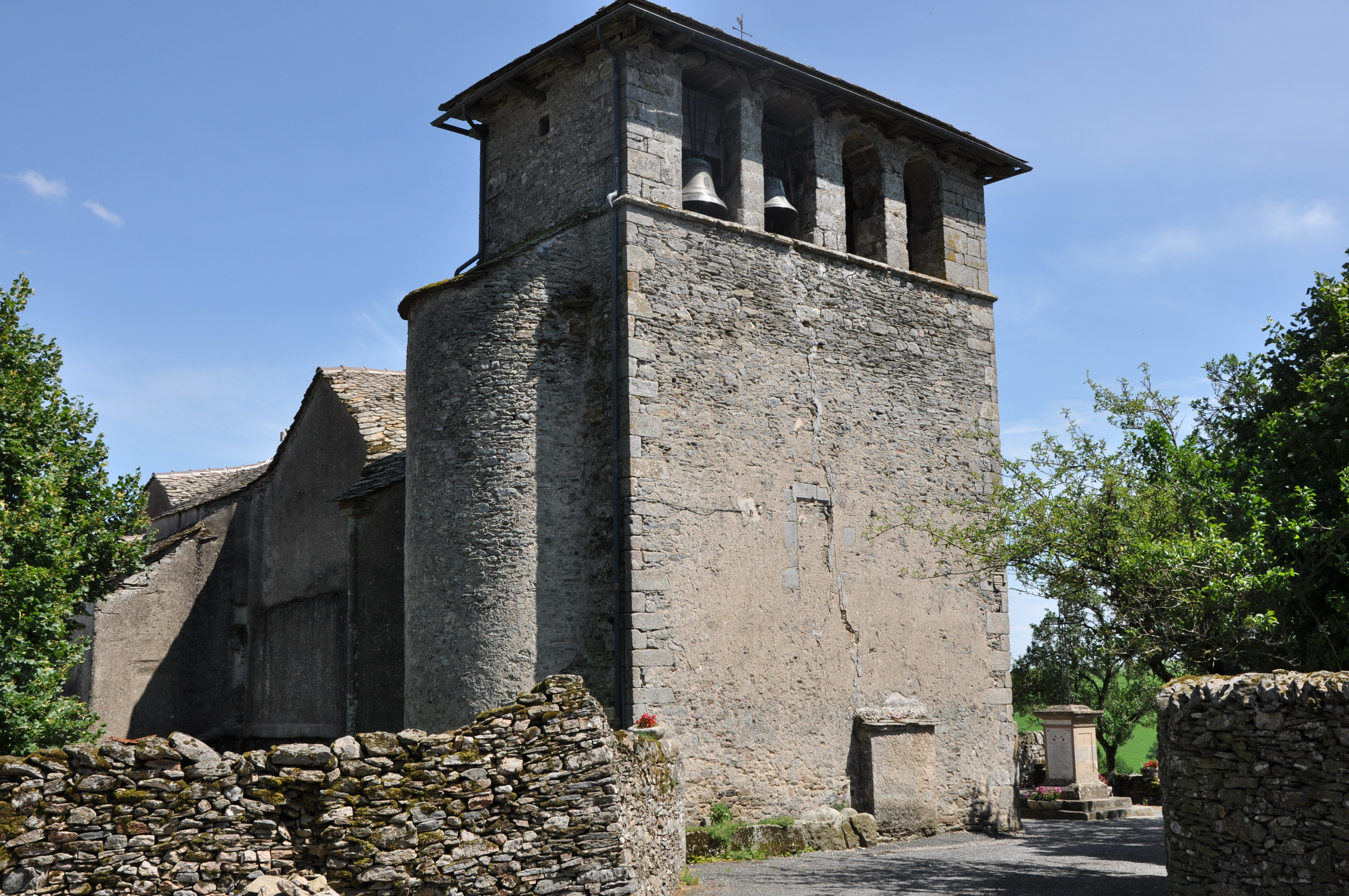
- The church in Le Vibal
- Location of Le Vibal
- Location within France Location within Occitanie
- Coordinates: 44°18′57″N 2°45′21″E
- Country: France
- Region: Occitania
- Department: Aveyron
- Arrondissement: Millau
- Canton: Raspes et Lévezou
- Intercommunality: Pays de Salars

Government
  - Mayor (2020–2026): Yves Regourd
- Area^{1}: 25.92 km^{2} (10.01 sq mi)
- Elevation: 700 m (2,300 ft)
- Highest elevation: 931 m (3,054 ft)
- Lowest elevation: 650 m (2,130 ft)
- Population (2023): 519
  - Density: 20.0/km^{2} (51.9/sq mi)
- Time zone: UTC+01:00 (CET)
  - Summer (DST): UTC+02:00 (CEST)
- INSEE/Postal code: 12297 /12290
- ^{1} French Land Register data, which excludes lakes, ponds, glaciers > 1 km^{2} (0.386 sq mi or 247 acres) and river estuaries.

Le Vibal (French pronunciation: [lə vibal]; Occitan: Lo Bisbal) is a commune in the Aveyron department in southern France.

== Population ==
Historical population
Year	Pop.	±% p.a.
1968	558	—
1975	522	−0.95%
1982	488	−0.96%
1990	449	−1.04%
1999	449	+0.00%
2007	490	+1.10%
2012	480	−0.41%
2017	507	+1.10%
2023	519	+0.39%
Source: INSEE

== See also ==
- Communes of the Aveyron department
