= Lac de Bage =

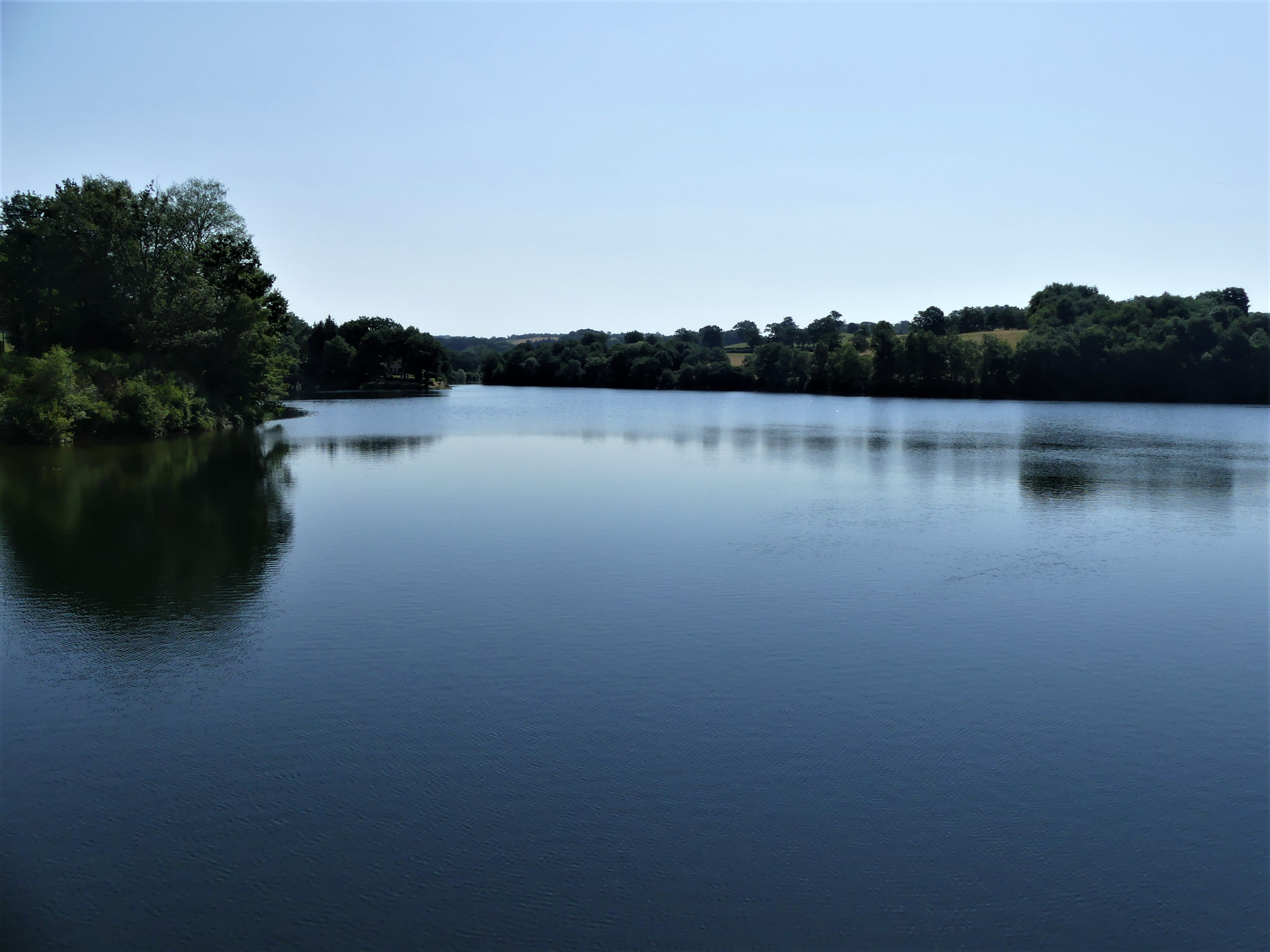

- Location within France
- Location: Aveyron
- Coordinates: 44°15′41″N 2°43′34″E
- Type: reservoir
- Primary outflows: Bage
- Basin countries: France
- Surface area: 0.53 km^{2} (0.20 sq mi)
- Max. depth: 27 m (89 ft)
- Surface elevation: 715 m (2,346 ft)

Lac de Bage is a lake in Aveyron, France. At an elevation of 715 m, its surface area is 0.53 km².
