= Lestrade-et-Thouels =

Commune in Occitanie, France

- Commune
- Coat of arms
- Location of Lestrade-et-Thouels
- Location within France Location within Occitanie
- Coordinates: 44°03′37″N 2°39′37″E
- Country: France
- Region: Occitania
- Department: Aveyron
- Arrondissement: Millau
- Canton: Raspes et Lévezou

Government
  - Mayor (2020–2026): Bernard Castanier (LR)
- Area^{1}: 42.27 km^{2} (16.32 sq mi)
- Elevation: 720 m (2,360 ft)
- Highest elevation: 803 m (2,635 ft)
- Lowest elevation: 315 m (1,033 ft)
- Population (2023): 440
  - Density: 10/km^{2} (27/sq mi)
- Time zone: UTC+01:00 (CET)
  - Summer (DST): UTC+02:00 (CEST)
- INSEE/Postal code: 12129 /12430
- ^{1} French Land Register data, which excludes lakes, ponds, glaciers > 1 km^{2} (0.386 sq mi or 247 acres) and river estuaries.

Lestrade-et-Thouels (French pronunciation: [lɛstʁad e twɛl]; Occitan: L'Estrada e Toels) is a commune in the Aveyron department in southern France.

== Population ==
Historical population
Year	Pop.	±% p.a.
1968	672	—
1975	612	−1.33%
1982	624	+0.28%
1990	534	−1.93%
1999	454	−1.79%
2007	423	−0.88%
2012	486	+2.82%
2017	493	+0.29%
2023	440	−1.88%
Source: INSEE

== Relation to Inspector Lestrade ==
The village of Lestrade-et-Thouels is considered as a possible origin of the family name "Lestrade", made famous through the character Inspector Lestrade who appears in numerous Sherlock Holmes stories. Arthur Conan Doyle is known to have given the fictional inspector the name of a friend from his days at the University of Edinburgh, a Saint Lucian medical student, Joseph Alexandre Lestrade. The ancestry of Joseph Lestrade is not sufficiently known to establish a certain link between him and the French village.

== See also ==
- Communes of the Aveyron department
