= Canet-de-Salars =

Commune in Occitanie, France

- Commune
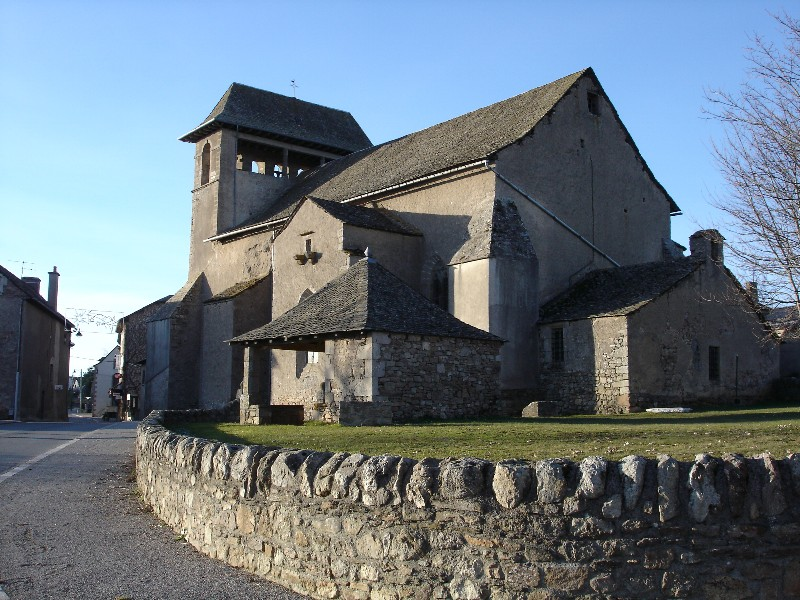
- The church in Canet-de-Salars
- Location of Canet-de-Salars
- Location within France Location within Occitanie
- Coordinates: 44°14′11″N 2°45′18″E
- Country: France
- Region: Occitania
- Department: Aveyron
- Arrondissement: Millau
- Canton: Raspes et Lévezou
- Intercommunality: Lévézou Pareloup

Government
  - Mayor (2020–2026): Francis Bertrand
- Area^{1}: 29.97 km^{2} (11.57 sq mi)
- Elevation: 850 m (2,790 ft)
- Highest elevation: 870 m (2,850 ft)
- Lowest elevation: 713 m (2,339 ft)
- Population (2023): 451
  - Density: 15.0/km^{2} (39.0/sq mi)
- Time zone: UTC+01:00 (CET)
  - Summer (DST): UTC+02:00 (CEST)
- INSEE/Postal code: 12050 /12290
- ^{1} French Land Register data, which excludes lakes, ponds, glaciers > 1 km^{2} (0.386 sq mi or 247 acres) and river estuaries.

Canet-de-Salars (French pronunciation: [kanɛ də salaʁ]; Occitan: Canet) is a commune in the Aveyron department in southern France.

== Population ==
Historical population
Year	Pop.	±% p.a.
1968	510	—
1975	485	−0.72%
1982	440	−1.38%
1990	440	+0.00%
1999	379	−1.64%
2007	398	+0.61%
2012	422	+1.18%
2017	431	+0.42%
2023	451	+0.76%
Source: INSEE

== See also ==
- Communes of the Aveyron department
