= Saint-Laurent-de-Lévézou =

Commune in Occitanie, France

- Commune
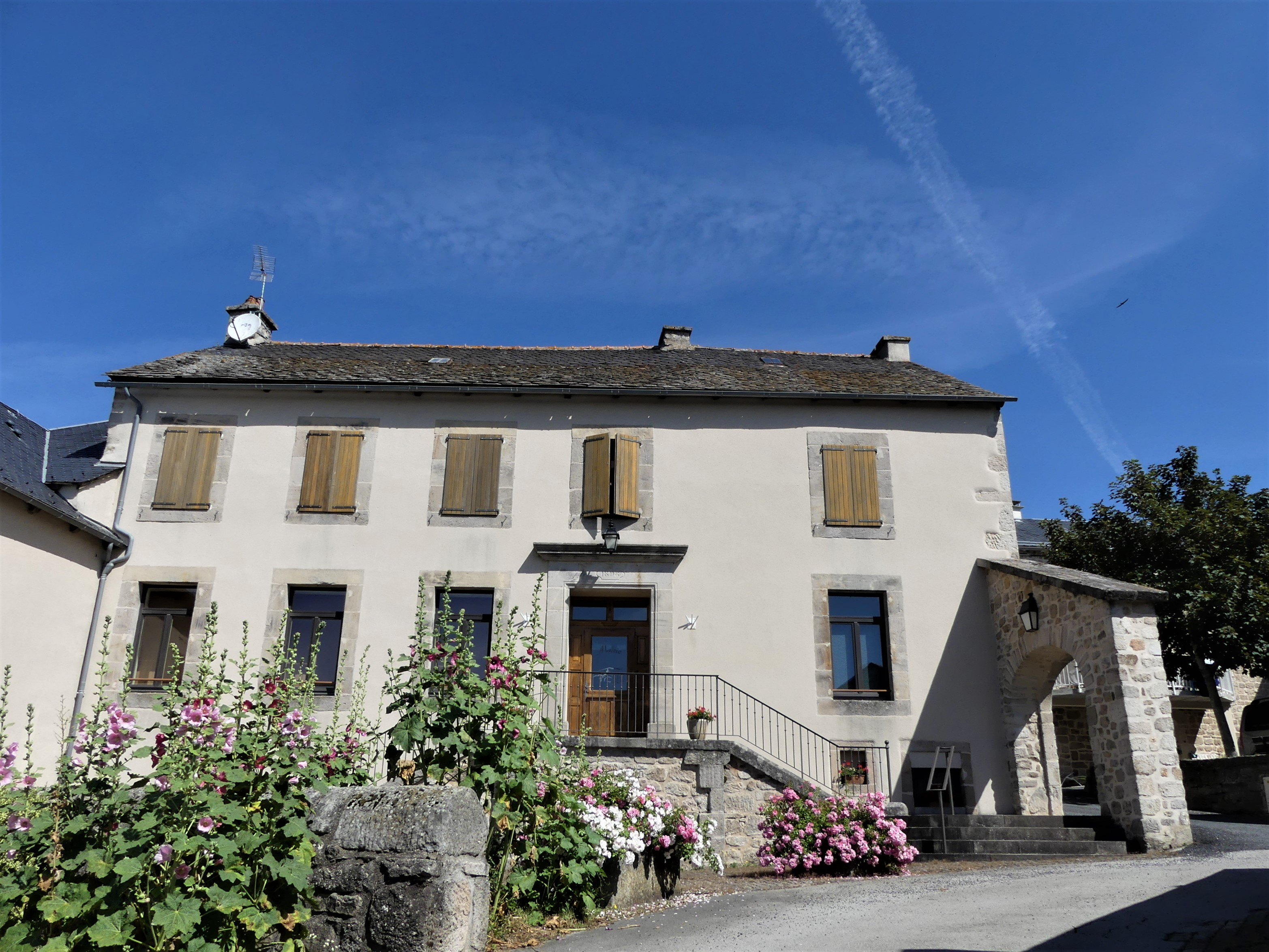
- Saint-Laurent-de-Lévézou Town hall
- Location of Saint-Laurent-de-Lévézou
- Location within France Location within Occitanie
- Coordinates: 44°12′31″N 2°57′34″E
- Country: France
- Region: Occitania
- Department: Aveyron
- Arrondissement: Millau
- Canton: Raspes et Lévezou
- Intercommunality: Lévézou Pareloup

Government
  - Mayor (2020–2026): Patrick Contastin
- Area^{1}: 23.33 km^{2} (9.01 sq mi)
- Elevation: 850 m (2,790 ft)
- Highest elevation: 1,121 m (3,678 ft)
- Lowest elevation: 614 m (2,014 ft)
- Population (2023): 161
  - Density: 6.90/km^{2} (17.9/sq mi)
- Time zone: UTC+01:00 (CET)
  - Summer (DST): UTC+02:00 (CEST)
- INSEE/Postal code: 12236 /12620
- ^{1} French Land Register data, which excludes lakes, ponds, glaciers > 1 km^{2} (0.386 sq mi or 247 acres) and river estuaries.

Saint-Laurent-de-Lévézou (French pronunciation: [sɛ̃ loʁɑ̃ də levezu]; Occitan: Sent Laurenç de Leveson) is a commune in the Aveyron department in southern France.

== Population ==
Historical population
Year	Pop.	±% p.a.
1968	198	—
1975	166	−2.49%
1982	157	−0.79%
1990	124	−2.91%
1999	152	+2.29%
2007	156	+0.33%
2012	157	+0.13%
2017	153	−0.51%
2023	161	+0.85%
Source: INSEE

== See also ==
- Communes of the Aveyron department
