= Lac de Pont-de-Salars =

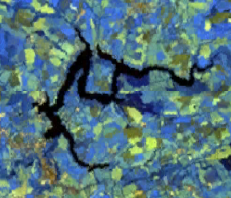

- Location within France
- Location: Aveyron
- Coordinates: 44.295525°N 2.743719°E
- Type: reservoir
- Primary outflows: Viaur
- Basin countries: France
- Surface area: 1.82 km^{2} (0.70 sq mi)
- Max. depth: 34 m (112 ft)
- Surface elevation: 718 m (2,356 ft)

Lac de Pont-de-Salars is a lake in Aveyron, France. At an elevation of 718 m, its surface area is 1.82 km^{2}
