= De Barrau family =

French family Aveyron, France

de Barrau
- Family coat of arms
- Country: France
- Current region: Rouergue
- Founded: 16th century
- Historic seat: Château de Carcenac
- Titles: Decoration of the Lily; Order of Saint Louis; Legion of Honour; Croix de guerre 1914–1918 (France); Cross for Military Valour
- Connected families: Saint-Igest; Gaillac d'Aveyron; Le Coutal
- Estates: Trémouilles, del Puech, Caplongue, Frayssinous, Espinassettes, and other fiefs

The de Barrau family is a French noble family from the province of Rouergue, now the department of Aveyron, in France.

Descended from a notary who lived in the 16th century, it began its noble alliances in that same century. In the following century, Guion de Barrau established himself as a nobleman and succeeded in having this status maintained after being convicted of usurpation of nobility. In the 18th century, Madame de Barrau was abducted and arrested by a lettre de cachet in 1767; in 1789, Pierre Firmin de Barrau de Caplongue was one of the drafters of the cahier de doléances of the nobility of the Rodez and Millau bailiwicks; the family château was looted and burnt down in 1793; Barrau father and son were summoned to appear before the Revolutionary Tribunal in 1794. After the French Revolution, some of its members became notables in the Aveyron department. Three of the latter were historians, including Hippolyte de Barrau, who in 1836 proposed the creation of a learned society, the Société des lettres, sciences et arts de l'Aveyron [Society of letters, sciences and arts of Aveyron]; he was its first president, and the de Barrau family is still represented on it. Another family member was a botanist on the Commission d'exploration scientifique d'Algérie [Commission for the Scientific Exploration of Algeria]. Moreover, many of them defended Catholic and royalist ideals from the French Revolution to the First World War. It is relevant to mention de Barrau in 1792, who had revolutionaries shot, Eugène de Barrau in 1852, who carried out a confidential mission for the “Count of Chambord”, or Jean de Barrau, member of the steering committee of the National Federation of the King's Camelots and private secretary to the Duke of Orléans in 1914. In the 20th century, following the fighting in the First World War, four of the six young Barrau men died.

This family has left several traces of its history in the Aveyron department.

== History ==
=== Patronymic ===
According to the Filae website, between 1891 and 1990, the Occitan surname Barrau ranked 1,544th among the most frequently borne names in France, making it not very popular nationally. During this period, it was mainly found in southwestern and southern France, and the departments where it is most represented are, in descending order, Tarn, Haute-Garonne, Aveyron, Hérault, Aude, etc.

There are no works on the study of this surname; however, French writer and lexicographer Frédéric Mistral writes that the Barrau surname is said to come from the Romance barrau, barral, meaning “barrel”, a small barrel with a neck. This surname is thought to be a nickname for a manufacturer or merchant of barrels, casks, or barrels. Barrel comes from the Gallo-Roman barriculus, “barrel”, then from the Medieval Latin barriclus “small barrel ”. Claude Cougoulat, who has studied surnames of Gallic origin, writes that the root Barr- would designate a place difficult to access or closed or an obstacle.

The Barrau surname preceded by a particle has been borne by various families. Today, the de Barrau family (from Carcenac, Aveyron) is not to be confused with the de Barrau de Muratel and de Barrau de Muratel families, the latter two being commonly known as de Barrau.

=== Origins in central Rouergue ===
Geographical location of the Aveyron department (formerly province of Rouergue).

Joseph de Bonald, in Documents généalogiques sur des familles du Rouergue [], writes: “This family can only be traced back to 1557. However, traces of the family can be found before this period, notably in several ancient deeds in the departmental archives. These acts contain gaps and obscurities that make it impossible to establish its ancestry clearly and precisely beyond the 16th century. Firmin de Barrau, who tested his will on April 7, 1557, is the first author of proven filiation". Gustave Chaix d'Est-Ange writes that this family has been mentioned in deeds since the end of the 15th century. Hippolyte de Barrau writes: “The fire of 1793, by destroying most of our titles, deprived us of the means to further our research”. In the Cartulaire de l'Abbaye de Bonnecombe [Cartulary of Bonnecombe Abbey], edited by Pierre-Aloïs Verlaguet, the village of Carcenac-Salmiech mentions a person named Barraus da Carcennac, who witnessed a tithe agreement in 1233 and ceded rights to a farmhouse in 1242. However, in the absence of proof of filiation, this person cannot yet be linked to the de Barrau family.

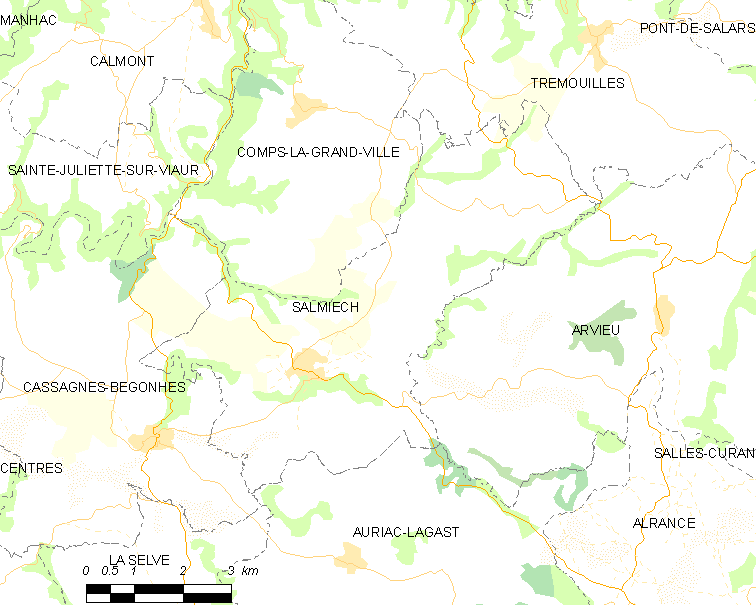
Map of the Rouergue region where the de Barrau family settled during the Ancien Régime.

Carcenac is an ancient village about five kilometers northeast of Salmiech. The toponym “Carcenac” has a Celtic ending in “ac” (from -acum). The first construction of its church dates from at least the 13th century. In the Middle Ages, there was no castle in the parish of Carcenac, which came under the jurisdiction of the castellania of Salmiech, a domain of the Counts of Rodez and then the Lords of Landorre from the early 13th century. In the second half of the 18th century, the wife of a member of the de Barrau family described the village as being located “on a deserted mountain”.

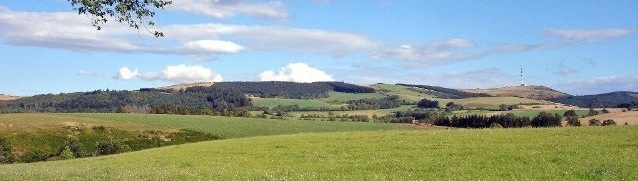
Lévézou landscape.

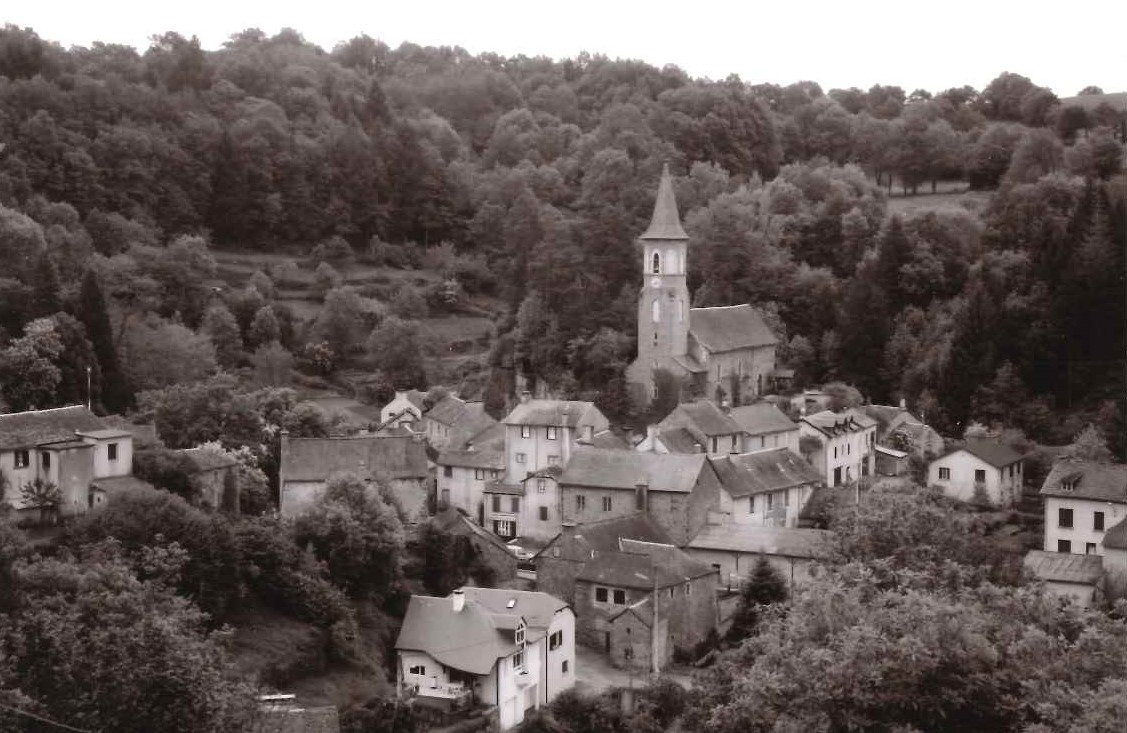
Partial view of Salmiech with Saint-Firmin church.

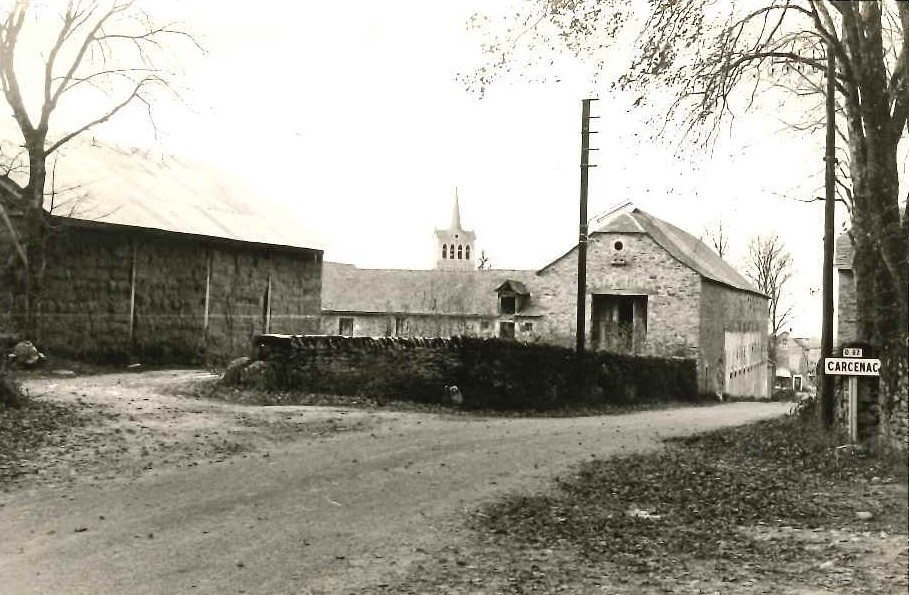
Entrance to the village of Carcenac, east side.

In their works, Hippolyte de Barrau and Henri Jougla de Morenas mention that the de Barrau family has been noble since 1557, but this information has been shown to be erroneous. (Note: In his genealogy of his family, Hippolyte de Barrau writes that he is described as a noble in the will he made on April 7, 1557 before notary Mr. Dufieu. Today, there is no trace of this will, nor of a Dufieu notary at this date. In 1533, however, we find mention of Antoine Barrau, son of Pierre, notary of Salmiech (Henri Affre, Inventaire-sommaire des Archives départementales de l'Aveyron antérieures à 1790, archives civiles, série E, Paris: Imprimerie et librairie administratives de Paul Dupont, 1877, page 415, E1899), but the link with Firmin Barrau, notary, who died according to Hippolyte de Barrau in 1557, is not established by secondary sources. Concerning the notary Dufieu who is said to have received the will, Hippolyte de Barrau points out that it was the same notary who drew up the marriage contract of his son Firmin II Barrau on June 10, 1572 with Françoise de Méjanès, daughter of Arnaud, seigneur de Larguiez. However, there is only one notary of this name in Rouergue, Joachim Dufieu, father and son, at Le Truel, practicing from 1576 to 1662, dates which do not coincide for deeds passed in 1557 and 1572. Their minutes and tables are deposited in the Departmental Archives of Aveyron, cotes 2E 14.236 to 250. The will of 1557 appears to be erroneous, but the marriage of Firmin II Barrau to Françoise de Méjanès is confirmed by the Aveyron archives (see Henri Affre's work).) The family's proven and followed lineage can be traced back to Firmin Barrau, who was a notary in the 16th century in Salmiech. This village or small market town lies some twenty kilometers southeast of Rodez, Rouergue's main city, on the western edge of the Lévézou region, close to Ségala.

=== Social ascent ===
==== Alliances with the old nobility of Rouergue ====
In the second half of the 16th century, Firmin (II) Barrau, son of Firmin Barrau, married Françoise de Méjanès, whose family belonged to the ancient nobility of Rouergue. During the French Wars of Religion, his father-in-law defended a provincial town against Huguenot advances. Firmin II Barrau and his wife's children included Firmin III, who took over the family estate in Carcenac, and Laurens, who inherited the Coutal estate between Arvieu and Salles-Curan, forming a branch that would remain commoner.

Firmin (III) Barrau in turn married a noblewoman in 1611. Gustave Chaix d'Est-Ange writes: “Firmin Barrau became related to the best noble families of the country through his marriage on June 5, 1611, to Marie de Faramond, daughter of François de Faramond, from an old knight family still in existence, and Louise de Lapanouse ”. François de Faramond is the eldest of his lineage and his mother is Marguerite de Morlhon. Louise de Lapanouse-Fabrègues, lady of Grèzes, is the daughter of Guion de Lapanouse and Helips de Brezons.

Thus, for two generations under the last Valois kings and the first Bourbon kings, the Barrau heirs in Carcenac have been contracting alliances with the ancient nobility of their province. Both alliances were with local families who lived in the same part of Rouergue as they did. The de Méjanès family, in possession of Lévézou, traces its nobility back to the Middle Ages. The de Faramond family takes its name from a place belonging to the castellania of Salmiech, Faramondie, and traces its nobility back to the 13th century, with a presumed noble ancestry in the 12th century. It was a vassal of the castellans of Salmiech in the Middle Ages. Firmin (III) Barrau's mother-in-law was a Lapanouse, her family's nobility dating back to the 13th century. She bore the name of her village on the lands of the Barons of Sévérac, to whom they were vassals in the Middle Ages, and was admitted to the honors of the Court in the 18th century. As for the paternal grandmother of Firmin's wife (III), she was a Morlhon, a family whose nobility dates back to the 13th century, with presumed noble ancestry in the 11th century, and whose members included bailiffs.

These two marriages represent a desire for social advancement, but also the ability to support a wife from the nobility, giving them kinship within the Rouergue knight nobility. On the social significance of alliances under the Ancien Régime, historian Roland Mousnier writes: “In this patrilineal society, it is the marriages of the males that determine a family's social rank”; and Martin de Framond writes: “These movements up the social ladder, often masked in genealogies, can be judged by noting alliances”.

=== Reign of Louis XIV to Louis XVI ===
==== Third generation ====
In the next generation, one of Firmin's sons (III), Guion, married Anne de Vedelly in 1656 and became partial owner of the seigneury of Trémouilles. His marriage was not to a noble, but thanks to his father's and grandfather's alliances, he had several close ancestors who were noble. Through his wife's inheritance, he could now call himself a “seigneur” ("The ownership of a seigneury is a social dignity”) and draw income from this land; however, since 1579, land no longer gave nobility. Guion lived in the countryside, like his ancestors; he was a rural man, his father and grandfather having married daughters from old noble families who lived on their lands and served the kings as knights. On the strength of his family connections, and probably his wife's inheritance, he had been a nobleman since the mid-seventeenth century. In 1666, King Louis XIV ordered a major survey of the nobility. Unable to prove nobility either since 1560 or by ennoblement, Guion Barrau de Carcenac was sentenced on October 9, 1666, for usurpation of nobility to a 600 livre fine by Claude Pellot, Intendant of Bordeaux and Montauban. Despite his conviction, he is described as a nobleman and squire in the 1680 marriage contract of his son, noble Firmin de Barrau (1663-1739), who married a lady from an ancient knight family. In 1689 and 1692, he is still mentioned as noble Guion de Barrau.

His son, noble Firmin de Barrau, served on the bans of 1689, 1692, and 1694, as evidenced by certificates from the Rouergue nobility commanders confirming his service and discharging him in 1696.

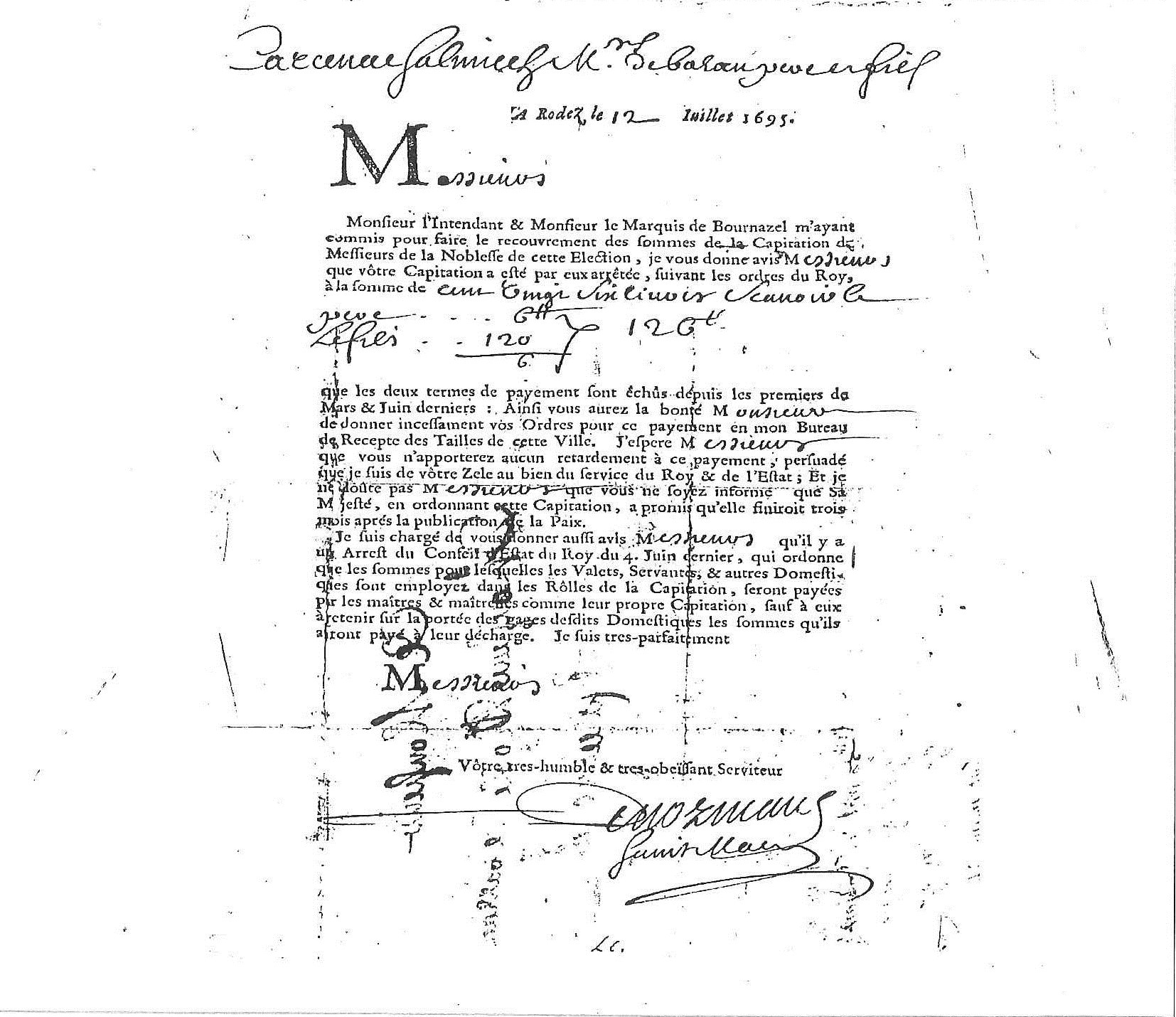
Capitation of the de Barrau father and son (1695).

In 1695, father and son de Barrau (Guion and Firmin de Barrau) were subject to the noble capitation tax. Firmin de Barrau had to pay 120 livres in capitation tax, corresponding to class 10, which taxed gentiles who were seigneurs of parishes, the highest degree of rural nobility, and his father 6 livres, corresponding to class 19, which taxed gentiles with neither fief nor château.

On September 19, 1699, Félix Le Peletier de La Houssaye, Intendant of the Generalitat of Montauban, granted Guion de Barrau de Carcenac a maintenance of nobility. We now know that this maintenance was based on the filiation of a family of the same name, the de Barrau de Muratel family. Indeed, Guion de Barrau used a forged baptismal certificate dated May 15, 1635, in which he is said to be the son of Jean de Barrau, lord of Campouliès, a member of the de Barrau de Muratel family. This fictitious attachment to the de Barrau de Muratel family has led to confusion between these two families among genealogists right up to the present day. (Note: Gustave Chaix d'Est-Ange mentions one maintenance in 1699 for the de Barrau family, and two maintenances in 1701 and 1716 for the de Barrau de Muratel family. Henri Jougla de Morenas mentions only one maintenance for the de Barrau family in 1699. The inventory of the Departmental Archives of Tarn- et-Garonne does not mention any proof of maintenance of nobility for the de Barrau family (which is to be expected, since this family was attached to the de Barrau de Muratel family in order to be maintained), but does mention proof of maintenance for the de Barrau de Muratel and de Barrau de Montagut families.)

In the 17th century, there were no judgments other than those of 1666 and 1699. (Note: Only Pierre Hocquellet, in Armorial général du Rouergue, mentions a conviction on August 2, 1698. This author makes no mention of the 1666 condemnation judgment, and attributes the maintenance judgment of September 19, 1699 to the Barrau de Muratel family, linking them to Guion de Barrau. He also writes that Firmin de Barrau was still serving in the armies in 1698 (although those serving in the armies were not included in the nobility searches). This author's information is therefore not retained, as it is not confirmed by other sources, first and foremost Bernard Chérin.)

The de Barrau family, from Carcenac in Rouergue, obtained a total of three maintenances of nobility from the intendants of Montauban: September 19, 1699, by Intendant Le Peletier de La Houssaye in favor of Guion de Barrau; on June 4, 1701, by Intendant Legendre in favor of Firmin de Barrau; on July 7, 1716, by Intendant Laugeois, again in favor of Firmin de Barrau, (Note: Note that the 1716 judgment mentions the 1699 judgment.) on a proof of nobility dating from 1539 that we know to be related to the de Barrau de Muratel family.

=== Alliances and close relatives ===
==== Heirs to the family estate ====
Since the 16th century, with the exception of Guion de Barrau in 1656 and 1667, and Pierre de Barrau in 1790, the heirs to the family estate have taken alliances with old land and knight nobility families of Rouergue. As for close relatives (mothers-in-law), (Note: Close relatives are considered to be the maternal side of wedding ties, i.e. mothers-in-law.) they are also all from the same background, except in the 16th century and 1656.

These alliances are: in the 16th century, the De Méjanès family (proven nobility 1486, presumed nobility 1382); in 1611, the De Faramond family (13th-century nobility with presumed 12th-century noble ancestry); in 1656, the de Vedelly family (bourgeoisie owning fief and bearing noble qualifications); in 1667, the Desplas family (bourgeoisie); in 1680, the de Flavin family (nobility 1447); in 1730, again with the de Faramond family; in 1759 the De Solages family (nobility 13th century); in 1790 the Dablanc family (non-noble branch of a Quercy family that had been ennobled in the 17th century).

These close relatives are: in the 16th century, the Mazières family (bourgeoisie); in 1611, the Lapanouse family (13th-century nobility, Court honors in the 18th century); in 1656, the Moyssety family (bourgeoisie); in 1667, the Combret family (medieval noble family to which Guion de Barrau's second mother-in-law is presumed to belong); (Note: To consult the genealogy of this family, see Hippolyte de Barrau, Documents historiques et généalogiques sur les familles et les hommes remarquables du Rouergue dans les temps anciens et modernes, tome 2, pages 53 to 73. We also find a Bernard de Combret among the nobles of Rouergue in Extrait du catalog des nobles du Rouergue en 1668, Bernard de Combret. The eldest branch died out in the male line at the beginning of the 14th century, but another branch survived until the end of the 16th century with Guion de Combret, who married Marie de Crussol d'Uzès in 1574 and had two daughters, Éléonore and Barbe, who was alive in 1604. It is therefore highly likely that Barbe de Combret, who married the lawyer Jean Desplas in the first half of the 17th century, and Bernard de Combret (the first name Bernard is found throughout this family's genealogy), were members of this very old noble Rouergate family (noble ancestry presumed to date back to the early 11th century) and probably among its last members. Hippolyte de Barrau's genealogy is only fragmentary.) in 1680, the Seguy family (presumed 13th-century noble ancestry); (Note: Hippolyte de Barrau writes that this family is of very ancient nobility, originating from a place called Séguinie, and that the first known member is Pierre de Seguy in 1275. The information he provides on this family is incomplete, making it impossible to determine its complete genealogy and proof of nobility.) in 1730, the de Michau family (maintained noble on proof of 1544); in 1759, the de La Roque-Bouillac family (early 14th-century nobility with presumed early 11th-century noble ancestry, court honors in the 18th century); (Note: This noble family was first mentioned in 1014, and its lineage has been traced since 1304. Jean I de la Roque, squire to King Charles VI, Jean II was one of three Frenchmen chosen by the King to fight at the head of the two armies camped at Saint-Ouen, where the French gained the upper hand, Jean de la Roque, knight of Saint-Michel in 1510, Flotard de la Roque, knight of Saint-Michel, commander for the King in Guyenne in the absence of the Marshall of Monluc, Jean Charles Flotard de la Roque, cavalry colonel, Knight of Saint-Louis, admitted to the French army in 1510. Family extinct.) in 1790, the de Morlhon family (13th-century nobility with presumed 11th-century noble ancestry).

In the 16th century, through this alliance with the de Méjanès family, more distant cousins of local noble families.

In the 17th century, of the three heirs, two allied themselves with the old nobility and one with the bourgeoisie.

In the 18th century, the father-in-law of Pierre Firmin de Barrau (1681-1761) was Commissary of nobility of election in Rodez, and that of Jean Antoine de Barrau (1737-1798) owned Carmaux, in the Albigeois region. Jean Antoine de Barrau's marriage enabled his children to inherit property in Albigeois. The alliance with the Solages family, based in Albigeois, enabled the Barraus to forge alliances outside Rouergue.

Furthermore, Jean Antoine de Barrau's son-in-law is the son of Jean-André de Balsac, a member of the Parlement of Toulouse.

Pierre de Barrau (1761-1829), son of Jean Antoine, has noble parents, grandparents, and great-grandparents on both his paternal and maternal sides, so if this is enough, he can be qualified as a “gentleman of four lines”. (Note: Roland Mousnier in his book Les institutions de la France sous la monarchie absolue (2005) writes that we need to go back to the great-grandparents (page 103). Alain Texier, in Qu'est-ce que la noblesse? (1995), writes that we must go back to the great-grandparents (page 514). La Roque, in Traité de la noblesse, writes that you have to go back to the great-grandparents (page 25) or the great-great-grandparents (page 27). Nicolas Viton de Saint-Allais in his De l'ancienne France (1833) writes that you have to go back to the great-great-grandparents (page 442). Thus, while there seems to be no consensus, there is a prevailing opinion in favor of going back to the great-grandparents.)

==== Other family members ====
In the 16th century, there were no noble alliances or noble relatives.

In the 17th century, alliances were made either with the nobility or the bourgeoisie, but they were always with families from Rouergue. Among noble alliances: in 1647, with the de Grimal family (maintained noble on proof of 1548); in 1676 with the de Bonnafos de Scorailles family (Gabrielle de Scorailles, lady heiress of the fief of Bourran, in Rouergue, had married Jean de Bonnafos in 1553); in 1685 with the de Davy family. Bourgeois alliances with fiefs and/or noble titles include: de Janson (before 1660), d'Assier de Tanus (1674), and de Moly (1675).

In the 18th century, the alliances were practically all with nobles. During this century, we can cite the following noble alliances: in 1750 with the de Trédolat family (maintained noble on proof of 1558); in 1755 with the de Méjanès-Puechlor family (branch of the de Méjanès family); in 1782 with the de Balsac-Firmy family (ennobled by charges). Among the few bourgeois alliances of this century, there was a new alliance with the de Vedelly family (1760).

==== Service to the king at the French court ====
During the 18th century, members of the de Barrau family served in the military household of kings Louis XV and Louis XVI, as king's bodyguards and musketeers.

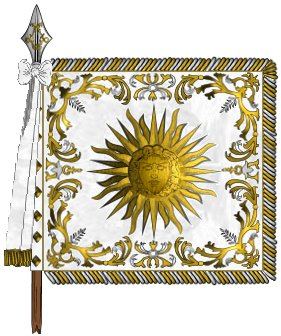
Standard of the Scottish company of the King's bodyguards.

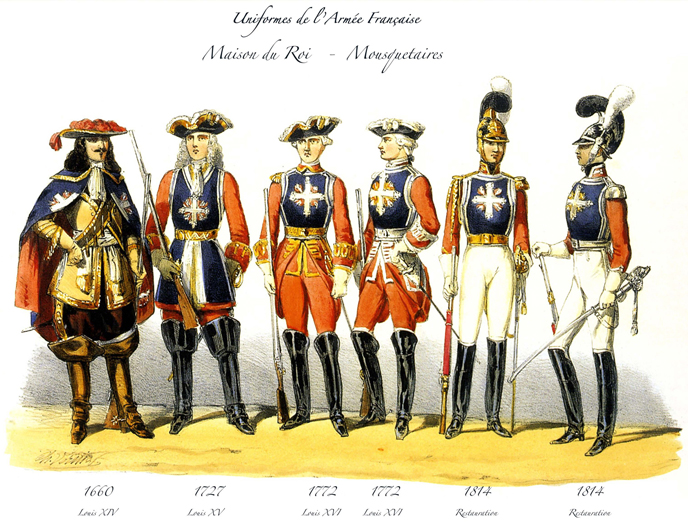
King's musketeers.

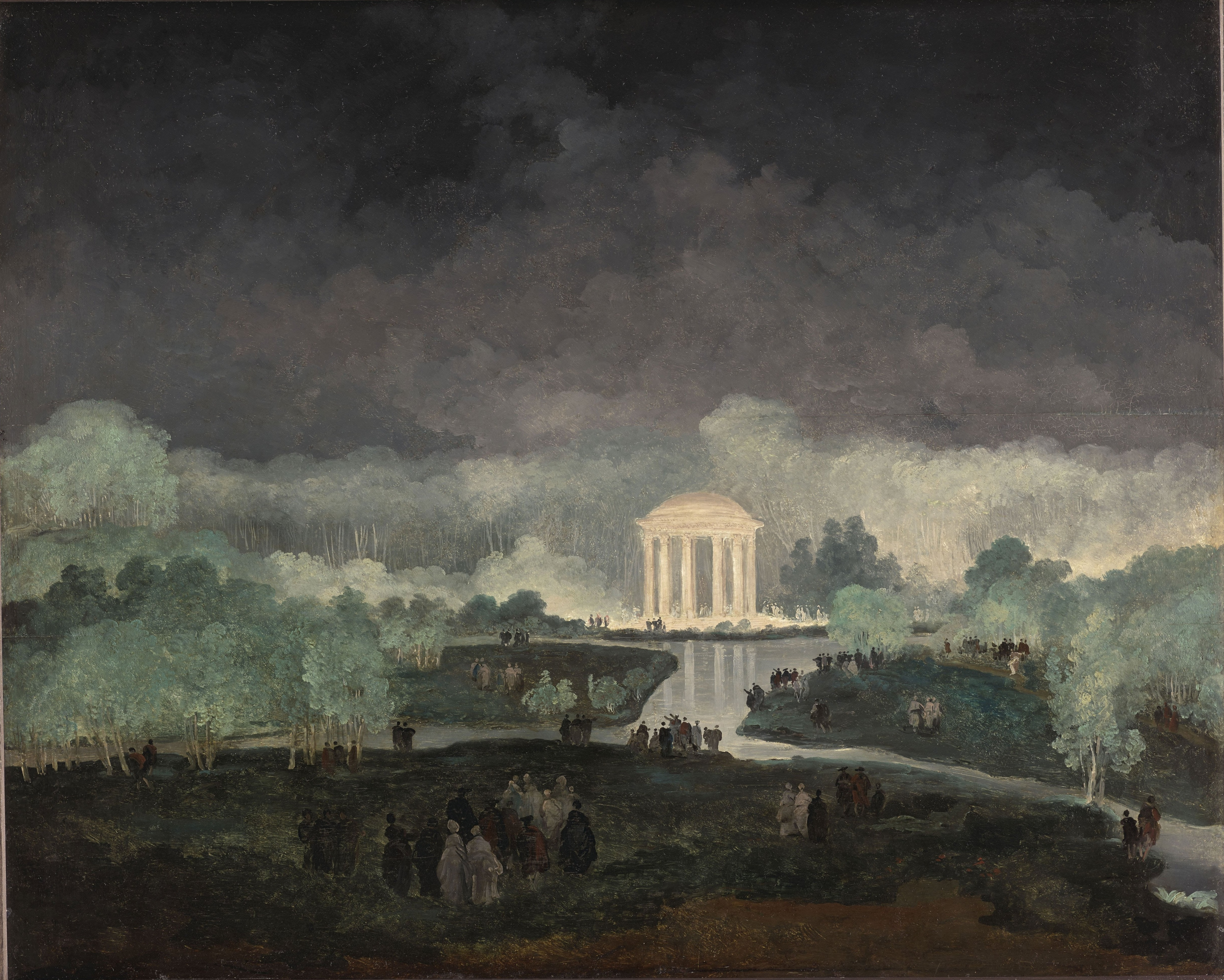
A night party given by Queen Marie Antoinette at Trianon.

One of Pierre de Barrau's sons said of his father: “an officer noted for his good looks, his skill on horseback, at arms, and dancing”. During his tours of duty at Versailles, Pierre de Barrau took part in a contra dance (four couples of dancers in a square) featuring Queen Marie Antoinette.

Others served in the royal armies, either as infantry, dragoons, cavalry, or chevau-légers, including Guillaume de Barrau, captain of infantry, made a knight of Saint-Louis in 1745, or Alexandre Augustin de Barrau (1745-1787), lieutenant of chevau-légers in the Royal-Navarre cavalry regiment in 1779 and then captain in Languedoc dragoons. Service in the armies and at the Court in Versailles was a way out of the rural world. In the regular army, all but one served in the officer corps. In the king's military household, they were non-commissioned men, but this service was more prestigious, as it took place at Court, and these men had the equivalent of officer rank in the regular army. In addition, the musketeer corps was aimed at young gentlemen whose families were well-connected and financially well-off. Service at Versailles enabled them to build up a network of relations at the Court and in Paris and to keep up to date with the latest fashions and news. They had first cousins who also served in the King's Military Household: Françoise de Barrau, married on August 6, 1755, to Joseph de Méjanès-Puechlor, King Louis XV's bodyguard, had two sons who were brigadiers in King Louis XVI's bodyguard corps.

Except for two members, one a judge in the 17th century and the other a lawyer in parliament after serving as King Louis XV's bodyguard, no member of the de Barrau family held any office or position. Some remained on their family land, while others served in the army.

In 1765, Madame de Barrau, née de Solages, was kidnapped by her brother, Count Hubert de Solages. Married since 1759 to Jean Antoine de Barrau, she said she wanted to escape from him and called on her brother. After this abduction, the de Solages brother and sister were arrested under lettres de cachet, the sister was sent to a convent and the brother was locked up in various fortresses, then at the Bastille in Paris, where he was freed by revolutionaries on July 14, 1789. Their father, Antoine Paulin de Solages, Marquis of Carmaux, admitted in 1776 that he had been tricked by Jean Antoine de Barrau into arresting his daughter. This affair sheds new light on why the Count of Solages was one of the seven Bastille prisoners released by the revolutionaries.

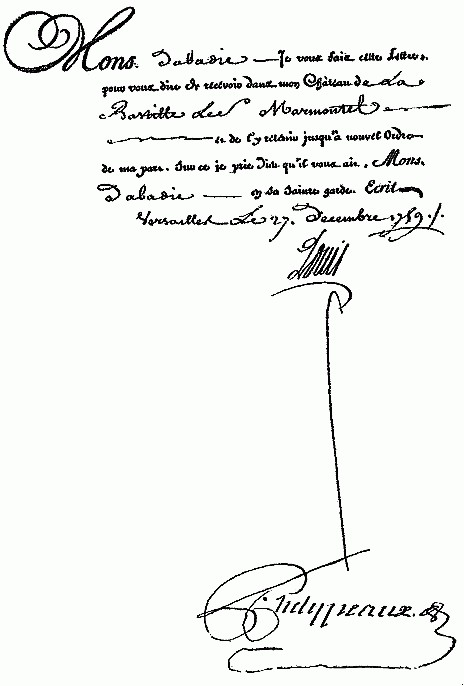
A lettre de cachet.

Storming of the Bastille on July 14, 1789.

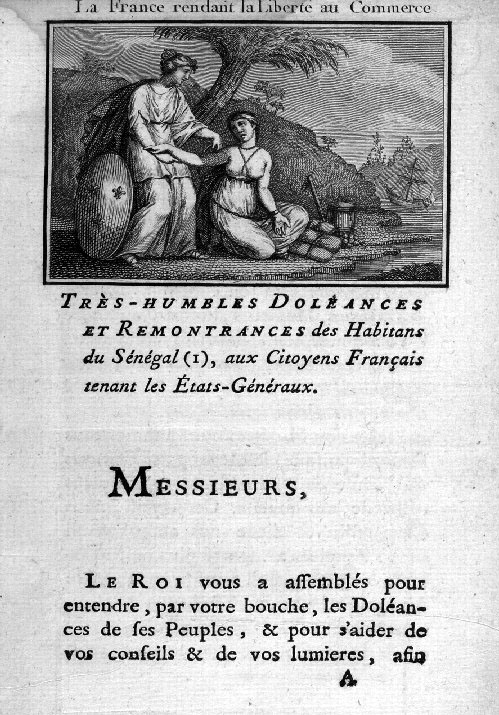
A cahier de doléances.

In 1789, Jean Antoine de Barrau, Pierre Firmin de Barrau de Caplongue, and de Barrau d'Espinassettes were called to the assemblies of the nobility of the bailiwicks of Rodez and Millau. (Note: See the minutes of the 1789 assemblies of the nobility of the Rodez and Millau bailiwicks, held by the Société des lettres, sciences et arts de l'Aveyron and published in the Mémoires de cette société savante (BnF, Gallica, Mémoires de la Société des lettres, sciences et arts de l'Aveyron, pages 87 to 91 (date of publication: 1906)). But also in Eugène de Barrau's 1789 en Rouergue - Étude historique et critique des institutions électorales de l'ancien et du nouveau Régime. Sénéchaussée de Rodez. In this work, Eugène de Barrau also cites the names of the eight writers of the nobility's cahier des doléances, namely: the Count of Freyssinet, the Marquis of Saint-Côme (Castelnau), the Count of Montvalat, the Count of Bosc, the Baron of Saint-Rome, Pierre Firmin de Barrau-Caplongue, the Viscount of Parlan and the Knight of Dourdou-Bourzès. See in particular pages 230 to 231, 284, 288 to 297. On the drafting of the cahiers de doléances of the nobility in the kingdom of France in 1789, Guy Chaussinand-Nogaret in La noblesse au XVIIIe siècle. De la Féodalité aux Lumières, page 201 (Hachette, 1976), reports: “To draft the cahiers, commissioners were elected, usually around ten, chosen mainly for their competence, and each article was then discussed and approved at a general assembly. The cahiers were therefore not the expression of a minority, of an elite disengaged from the bosom of the nobility, but rather that of the entire body (...)”.) Pierre Firmin de Barrau de Caplongue and de Barrau d'Espinassettes were among the electors. Jean Antoine de Barrau had given his powers of attorney to de Barrau de Caplongue.

Pierre Firmin de Barrau de Caplongue was one of the writers of the cahier de doléances for the nobility of the Rodez and Millau bailiwicks for the Estates General of 1789. (Note: This information was also given in 1902 by Maurice de Bonald: Gilles-Louis-Antoine de Grandsaigne (Millau 1749), musketeer to the king, then attached to the general tobacco farm, drew up, together with Mr. de Barrau-Caplongue, the cahier des doléances and the deliberations of the nobility of the bailiwicks of Rodez and Millau, gathered in March 1789 for the election of deputies to the Estates-General. It states, in reference to Antoine de Grandsaigne, born in Millau in 1749, a former musketeer attached to the general tobacco farm, that “his political opinions, favorable to the ideas of the day, led him to be chosen later to occupy the position of procurator-syndic of the district of Millau”.) (Note: Refer to the minutes of the sessions of the nobility preserved within the Société des lettres, sciences et arts de l'Aveyron, reproduced in the Mémoires de cette société savante [] (Memoirs of the Société des lettres, sciences et arts de l'Aveyron, pages 87 to 91), and also in Eugène de Barrau's 1873 book 1789 en Rouergue - Étude historique et critique des institutions électorales de l'ancien et du nouveau Régime [1789 in Rouergue - Historical and critical study of the electoral institutions of the old and new Regimes], which states that he was writing secretary and one of the drafters of the cahier de doléances of the nobility of this same bailiwick, albeit with seven other drafters.) In La noblesse au XVIIIe siècle [Nobility in the 18th century], Guy Chaussinand-Nogaret writes that the editors of the cahiers de doléances were chosen primarily on the basis of their competence.

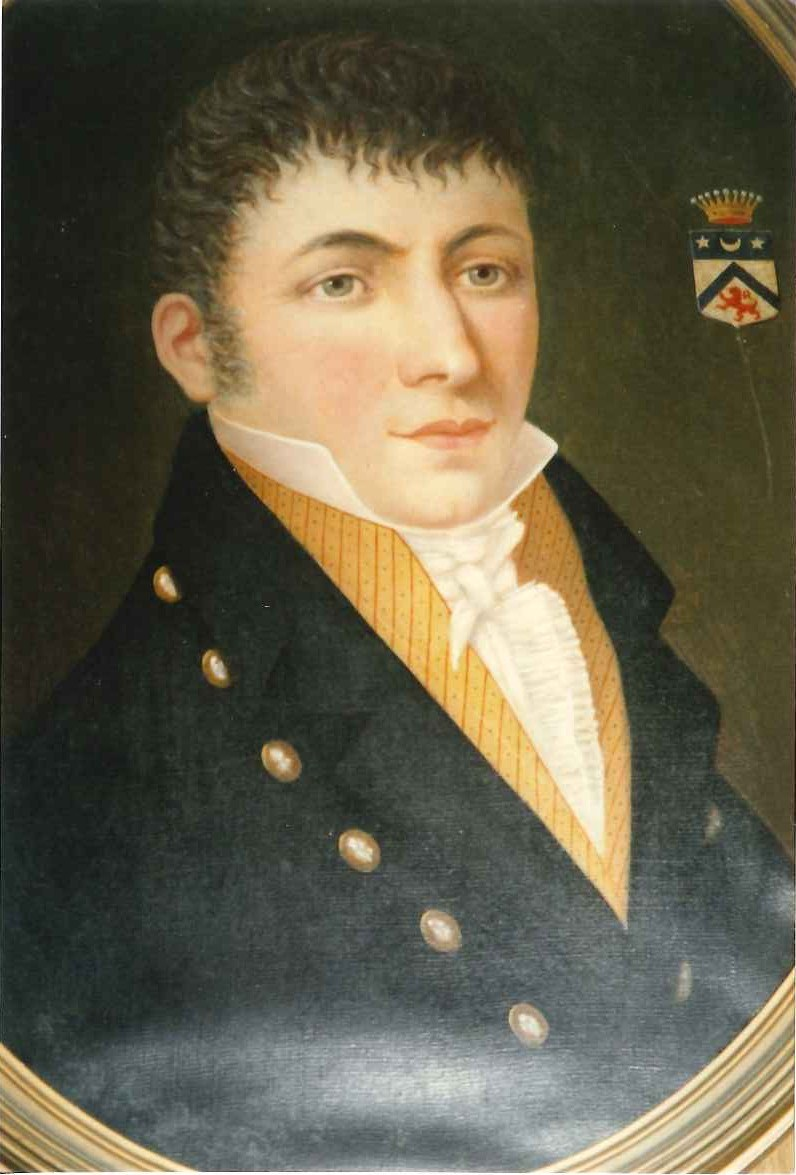
Pierre de Barrau (1761-1829).

During the French Revolution, the de Barrau family was accused of loyalty to the old monarchy. In 1792, de Barrau was mentioned in a case where he had protected refractory priests against revolutionary troops: “As soon as we arrived opposite Carcenac and Lagranville, we saw a large guard, with a leader, on our heels, and we were obliged to flee. How painful this admission is for true republicans (sic)! We were dying of grief. Their leader, de Barrau, fired on us. Two bullets whizzed past our ears; one went through the pocket of one of our soldiers, who was older and less able to run. They shouted all kinds of insults at us. And we retired at four o'clock in the evening, all sober. We would then have distributed twenty pounds to our detachment. Signed: Souyri, commander-in-chief of the Calmont battalion.” On November 1, 1793, revolutionary troops looted and set fire to the château belonging to the de Barrau family in the village of Carcenac. The then young soldier Jean-Baptiste Grivel took part in the sack. Pierre de Barrau had to hide in the woods and safe houses in the Aveyron countryside. On March 1, 1794, he surrendered himself as a prisoner in Rodez to free his father. A few months later, Antoine Fouquier-Tinville gave the order to bring Barrau father and son before the Revolutionary Court. The father was again sought, and on July 23, 1794, men came to fetch the son from the house of confinement where he was being held and transferred him to the criminal prison. However, the latter managed to escape in time through the roofs and was forced to jump over an alleyway when the gutters of the opposite roof broke under his feet. He then hid for three weeks in the rocks overlooking the Aveyron, not far from Belcastel, where friends brought him food at night.

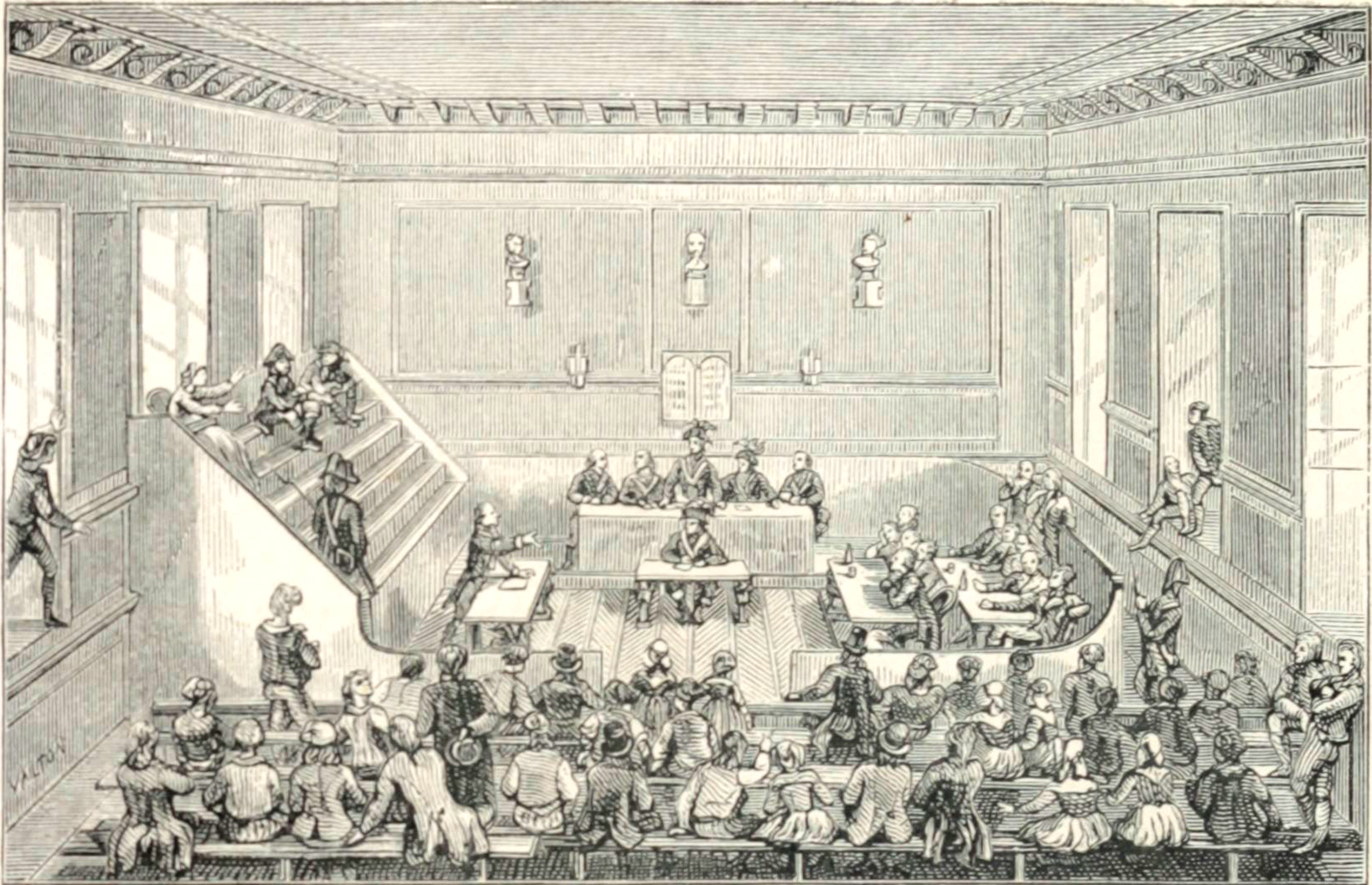
The revolutionary tribunal.

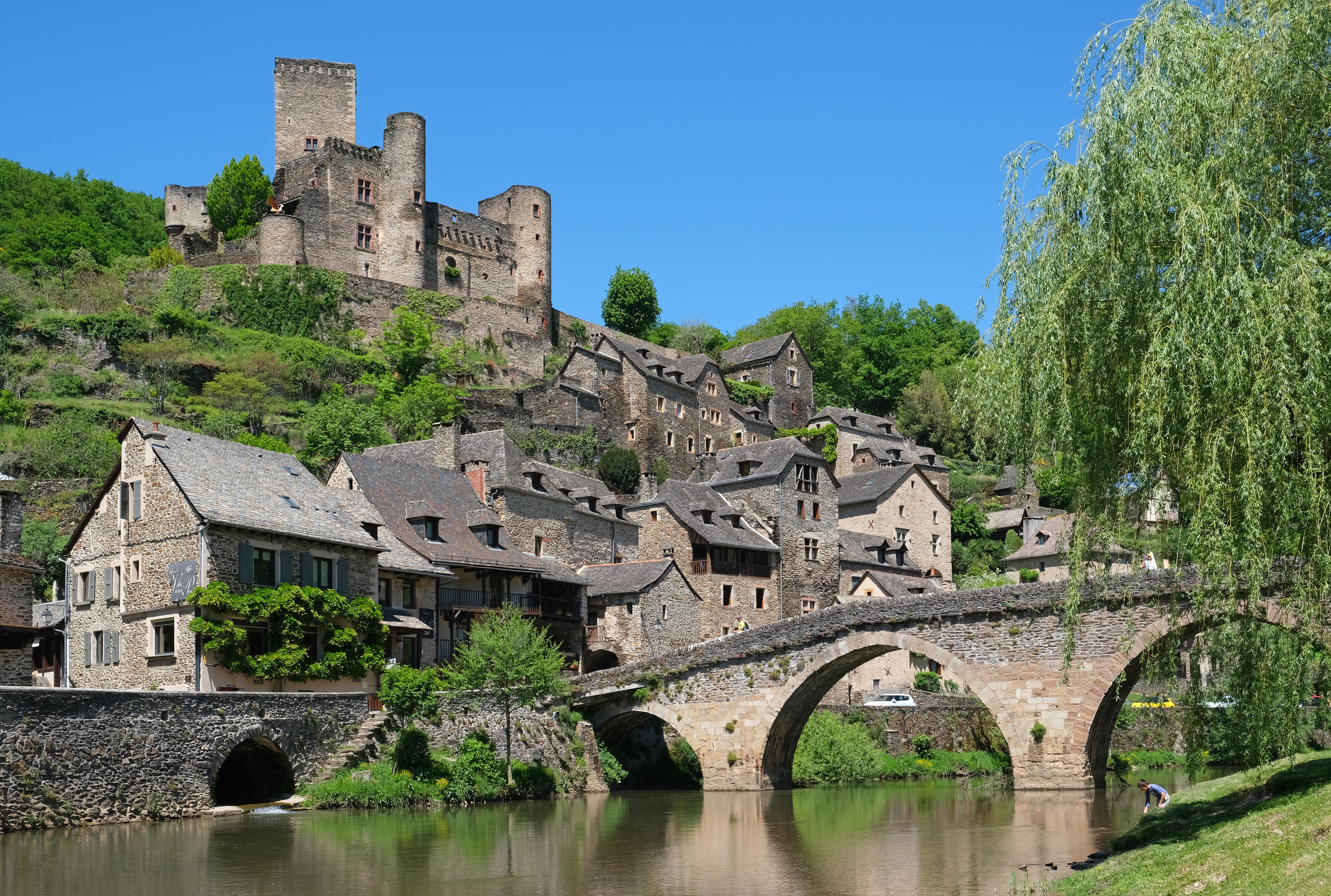
The Belcastel village.

=== After the French Revolution ===
In the new territorial entity formed in 1790 and named the Aveyron department, several personalities make up what was known as notables. Within this social group, which holds political mandates, landholdings, relationships, influence, and power, there are members of old families and among them members of the de Barrau family. The de Barrau family had assets located mainly in their former possessions, but also in Rodez and in the Marcillac valley, where the La Contie estate was located, which they inherited following the marriage of Eugène de Barrau. They held various positions and were involved in the department's press, and had family ties with other prominent Aveyron families (from 1782 with the de Balsac (de Firmy) family, to 1839 with the marriage of Eugène de Barrau). They also held elected office: Pierre de Barrau was mayor, Hippolyte de Barrau was mayor of Salmiech and general councilor in the combined communes of Cassagnes-Bégonhès and Réquista, Eugène de Barrau was general councilman in the commune of Cassagnes-Bégonhès and town councilman in Valady, Adolphe de Barrau was general councilman in the canton of Cassagnes-Bégonhès. In Quercy, Jean Baptiste Firmin de Barrau was mayor of Bretenoux from 1843 to 1846.

In this century, alliances were exclusively within the bourgeoisie, with only one close noble relative: de Catellan-Caumont.

At the start of the Restoration, Pierre de Barrau was the leading landowner in his commune. Benoît Delheure, author of the article Les notables ruthénois et la propriété foncière au temps de l'affaire Fualdès [The notable Ruthenois and land ownership at the time of the Fualdès affair], writes: “Alongside the commune of Bozouls, the commune of Cassagnes attracted six Ruthenois notables, most of whom were members of large, old Rouergat families [...] But the notable whose landholding seemed to be the most important in this canton was none other than Pierre-Firmin Barrau de Carcenac. This family is best known for the destruction of its château during the French Revolution. He appears in tax and registration sources as a landowner whose properties are spread across the region of Carcenac, Caplongue, Arvieu, Trémouilles, and Salmiech”.

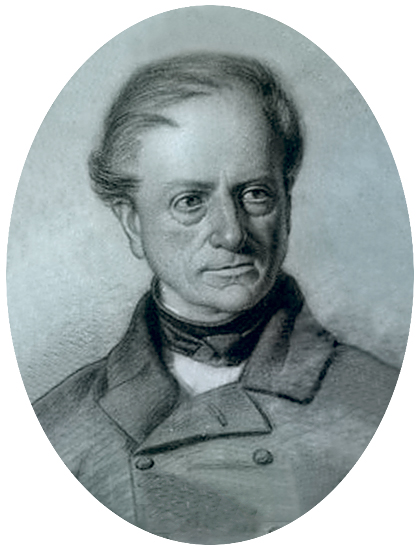
Hippolyte de Barrau (1794-1863).

Hippolyte, Eugène, and Adolphe de Barrau, three of Pierre de Barrau's sons, maintained relations and correspondences with other notables in their department, but also in other regions of France (for example, with Amédée de Pérusse des Cars, with Mr. de Saint-Priest, with Pierre-Antoine Berryer, with Alfred Moquin-Tandon). They also have a first cousin, Auguste de Balsac, son of Victoire de Barrau, who was a prefect, secretary general of the Minister of the Interior, State Councillor, and deputy.

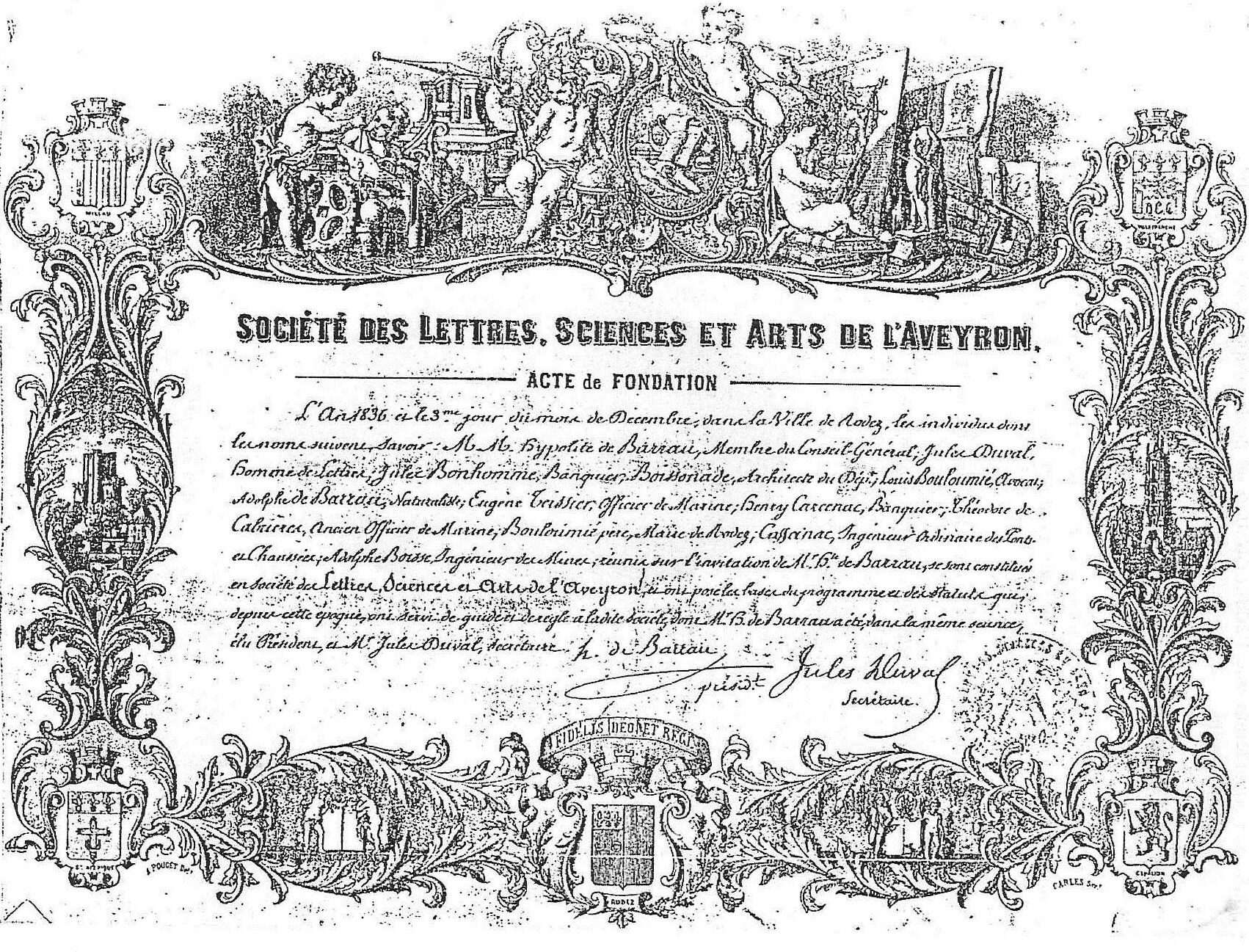
Foundation act for the Société des lettres, sciences et arts de l'Aveyron in 1836.

Since the Restoration, historical studies were being encouraged, and in 1836 Hippolyte de Barrau initiated the creation of the Société des lettres, sciences et arts de l'Aveyron, (Note: Letter dated April 10, 1837, archives of the Société des lettres, sciences et arts de l'Aveyron, quoted by Robert Taussat in the newsletter of the Société des lettres, sciences et arts de l'Aveyron, 2004.) a founding member with Jules Duval and other notables from the department, including his brother Adolphe de Barrau. He was elected its first president. Since its foundation, this learned society has brought together several notables, and various personalities to this day, and preserves numerous documents on the Aveyron département. Eugène de Barrau was admitted at the time of its foundation and was elected vice-president from 1871 until his death in 1887. (Note: Refer to the various minutes of the Société des lettres, sciences et arts de l'Aveyron from 1837 to the present day for the years concerned.) From 1889, Fernand de Barrau was also a member of the Societé. From 1836 to the present day, the de Barrau family has always been represented in the Société des lettres, sciences et arts de l'Aveyron.

In 1839 Eugène de Barrau married Coralie Manzon, daughter of Anicet Manzon and Marie Thérèse de Catellan-Caumont. Coralie was the widow of Henri de Séguret, who had been president of the Rodez court, deputy for Aveyron, and general councilor. Through his wife, Eugène is closely related to Louis de Guizard, prefect and deputy for Aveyron. After his marriage, Eugène de Barrau led an affluent life. He wrote his Mémoires, published in 2007 by the Société des lettres, sciences et arts de l'Aveyron. In the book, he wrote: “In the final analysis, Eugène de Barrau's Notebooks are extraordinarily rich and remarkably diverse. With their wealth of daily notes, they are a highly accurate document of the way of life, mentalities, and sensibilities of the department's circles of notables. But the Legitimist struggle lifted Les Chemins d'une vie [Paths of a life] into the sphere of national politics and ‘great history’, on which the editor of the Notebooks cast a sometimes impassioned, sometimes disillusioned eye”.

In 1849, Hippolyte de Barrau was appointed prefecture councilor at the Aveyron prefecture in Rodez, serving the State under various regimes, ending his career under the Second French Empire as secretary general of the same prefecture (1853-1855). One account states that “he was suddenly dismissed from his post, due to the hostility of certain people offended by his influence”.

Hippolyte, Eugène, and their nephew Fernand de Barrau devoted part of their time to historical works, particularly on the Rouergue region. Hippolyte also wrote a genealogical work on the families of Rouergue, which is still published today, (Note: Hippolyte de Barrau's work on the families of Rouergue has been republished twice since the 19th century: in 1972 by Editions du Palais Royal and in 2009 by the Société des sciences, arts et belles lettres du Tarn. To consult the printed version, please refer to the catalogs of the French National Library (Bibliothèque nationale de France, Paris, on the Tolbiac site, garden level), the Lyon municipal library, etc. Abroad, at Oxford University in England, for example.) and like his brother Eugène, he was also a memorialist. In 1935, Henry Bedel (secretary of Action française and member of the Société des lettres, sciences et arts de l'Aveyron) wrote in the Le Courrier du Centre journal: “It's quite something when a family successively offers several generations of literati devoted to the study of old grimoires over the course of a century. But when it also presents three historians of the caliber and seriousness of the three Barraus [Hippolyte, Eugène, and Fernand de Barrau], whose biography stops us here today, we have to bow our heads. Such examples are few and far between. The work of all three of them, spaced out over a hundred years or so, but often intermingling, penetrating, and continuing, is considerable. It hardly seems possible to study the end of the Ancien Régime and the beginning of modern times [in Rouergue] without recourse to them”.

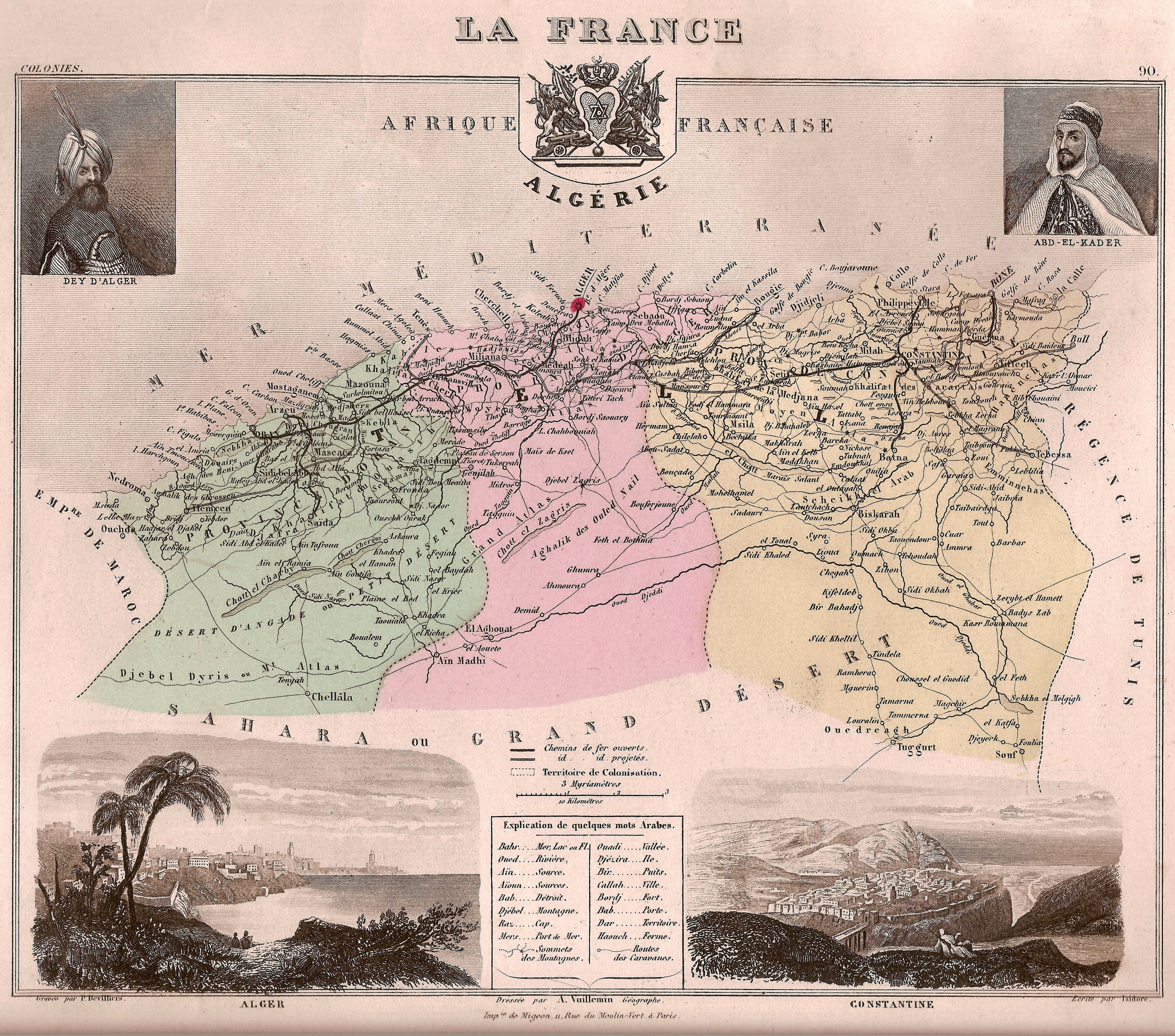
Map of French Algeria.

Adolphe de Barrau (1803-1884) was a doctor in Carcenac-Salmiech. He was interested in plants and was a herbalist from 1820 to 1845. In 1839 and 1840, under the July Monarchy, he was a botanist on the Commission d'exploration scientifique d'Algérie. Following France's conquest of Algeria in 1830, in 1833 was born the idea of setting up a commission to conduct research in Africa, and more specifically in Algeria. He joined a team of French scientists recruited based on their skills to explore the Algerian territory.

In 1880, Raymond de Barrau (1847-1931), a former lawyer at the Court of Appeal of Paris, Doctor of Law, and now a magistrate, resigned from his position following the expulsion of the Catholic Congregations from France. His letter of resignation, which was reproduced in two newspapers in southwest France, emphasized the defense of private property against the backdrop of the crisis between the French state and the Catholic Church: “Condom, date November 6, 1880. Mister Minister of Justice, I am sincerely convinced that the decrees of March 29 [issued by the Third Republic on March 29, 1880 in France against the congregations] are tainted by excess of power, as our most eminent jurisconsults have irrefutably established, and that, above all, they constitute a devious means for the administration to relieve the judicial authority, the sole and last safeguard of the right to property and the inviolability of the home, I consider it my duty to resign my functions, to which I was nevertheless deeply attached. To retain them for one more day would seem to imply at least tacit acceptance of measures that my conscience repudiates. I therefore have no hesitation in breaking off my career, even though I was not called upon to lend my effective support to the actions that have just taken place in the Condom district. Consequently, I have the honor to submit to you my resignation from the position of deputy to the court of this district. I have the honor to be, with respect, Mister Minister of Justice, your most humble servant. BARRAU.”

==== Catholic and royalist engagement ====
Since the French Revolution, members of the de Barrau family have been involved in defending Catholic and royalist ideals.

In 1792, de Barrau was mentioned in a case in which he protected refractory priests against revolutionary troops and had revolutionaries shot.

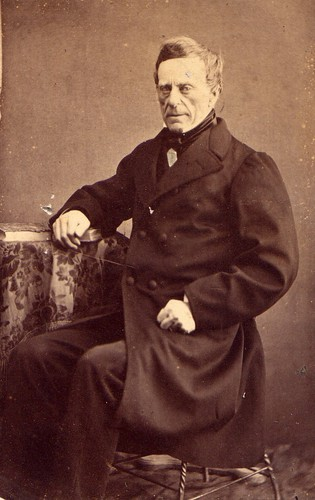
Eugène de Barrau (1801-1887).

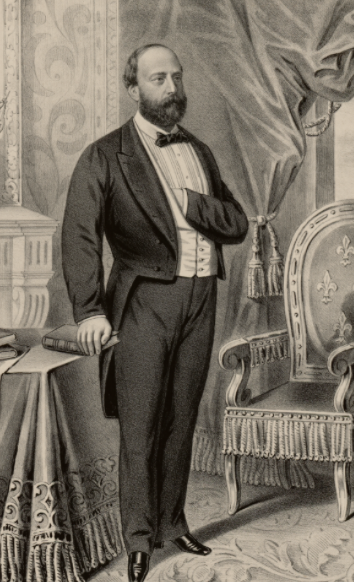
Henri d'Artois, known as the “Count of Chambord”.

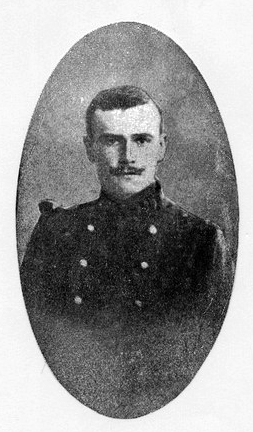
Jean de Barrau (1889-1914).

Hippolyte de Barrau, born in 1794, had an eventful military career lasting some fifteen years, during which time he took part with his brother Victor de Barrau (1796-1825), bodyguard to King Louis XVIII (Croÿ Company) and later army officer, in various attempts at royalist conspiracies. He was also one of the Knights of the Faith in Aveyron. In 1831, he launched La Gazette du Rouergue (1831-1836), a newspaper with Legitimist views.

Eugène de Barrau's new circumstances after his marriage in 1839 enabled him to devote himself to travel, religious and charitable activities, and more fully to his commitment to the Legitimist cause. In 1843, he visited Henri d'Artois, the Legitimist pretender to the thrones of France and Navarre; in 1845, he launched L'Écho de l'Aveyron (1845-1863), a right-wing newspaper opposed to the policies of Napoleon III; and in 1852, he was entrusted with a confidential mission to Henri d'Artois, about which he wrote in his personal notebooks: “I received a mission that could only be transmitted orally and by a reliable person. The idea of being of some use to my cause determined me very quickly, and the following night I had made up my mind [...] This [the audience] was short, and the prince gave me in a few words his verbal reply to the verbal message I had sent to him”.

From 1886 to 1901, Fernand de Barrau (1851-1938) was editor-in-chief of the Journal de l'Aveyron, a Catholic and royalist newspaper at the time. On taking up his post, he declared: “Le Journal de l'Aveyron, which is entering its eighty-second year, is today changing its editor: it will not change its principles. Before us, it was monarchist and Catholic; at his age, one cannot correct oneself; its subscribers will always find it Catholic and monarchist”.

At the beginning of the 20th century, Jean and Paul de Barrau, two of the sons of Fernand de Barrau and Henriette Fabre, continued their commitment to the royalist cause. They were members of Action Française, a royalist political force under the influence of Charles Maurras. During his military service, Jean was reunited with Maxime Real del Sarte, and, known for his opinions, he was imprisoned. With the King's Camelots, he took part in acts of violence. On March 14, 1913, he was at the Roundabout of the Panthéon in Paris, where the Camelots charged the anti-militarists, the same year he slapped a teacher in Rodez accused of anti-militarist remarks. In November 1913, he joined the executive committee of the National Federation of King's Camelots. He was also private secretary, from February to August 1914, to Philippe, Duke of Orléans, the Orleanist pretender to the throne of France. The prince, under the exile law, and his secretary lived at the Anjou manor in Belgium. Paul, for his part, founded an Action française section in Rodez in 1909, of which he was president.

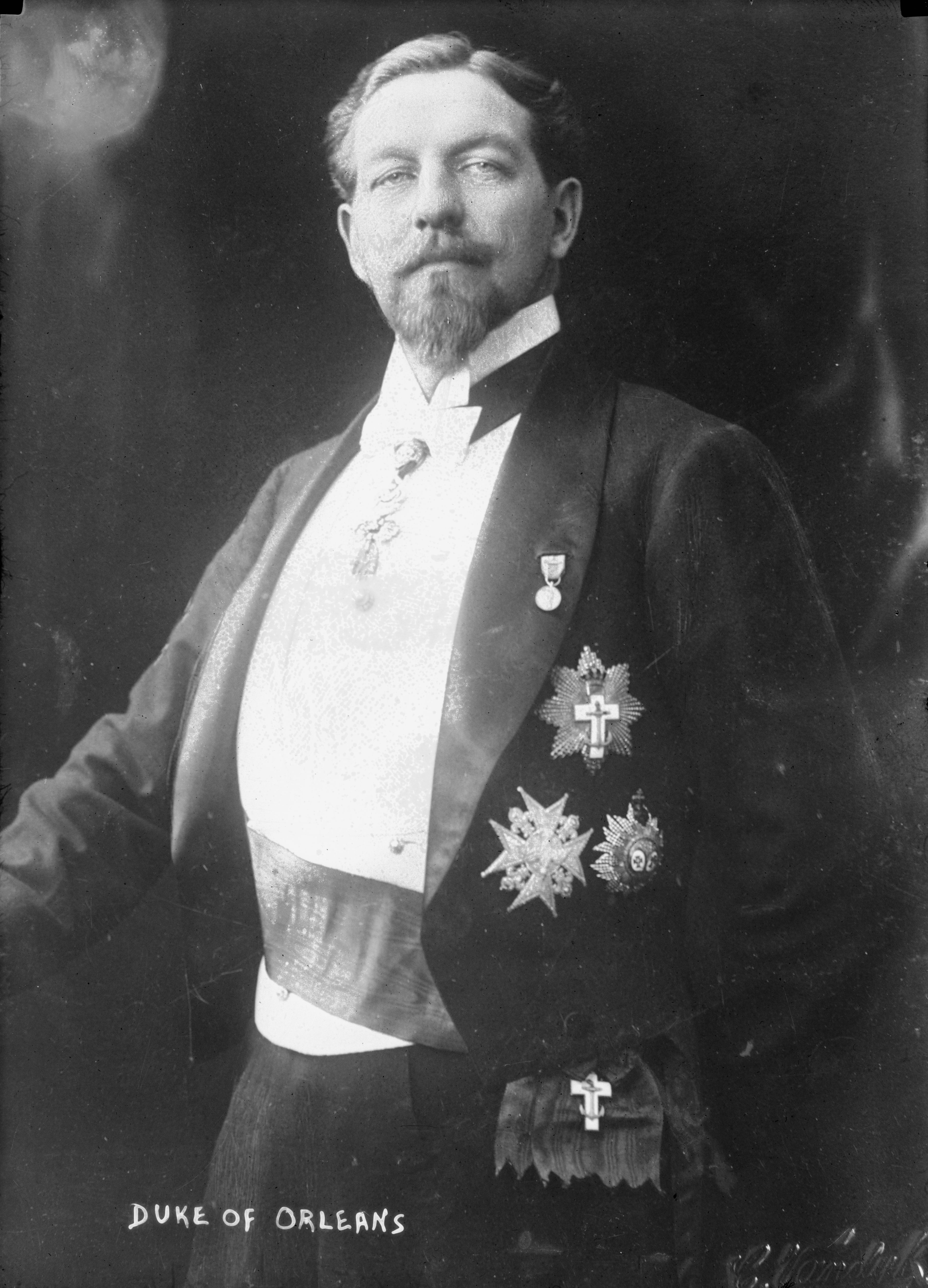
Philippe, Duke of Orléans.

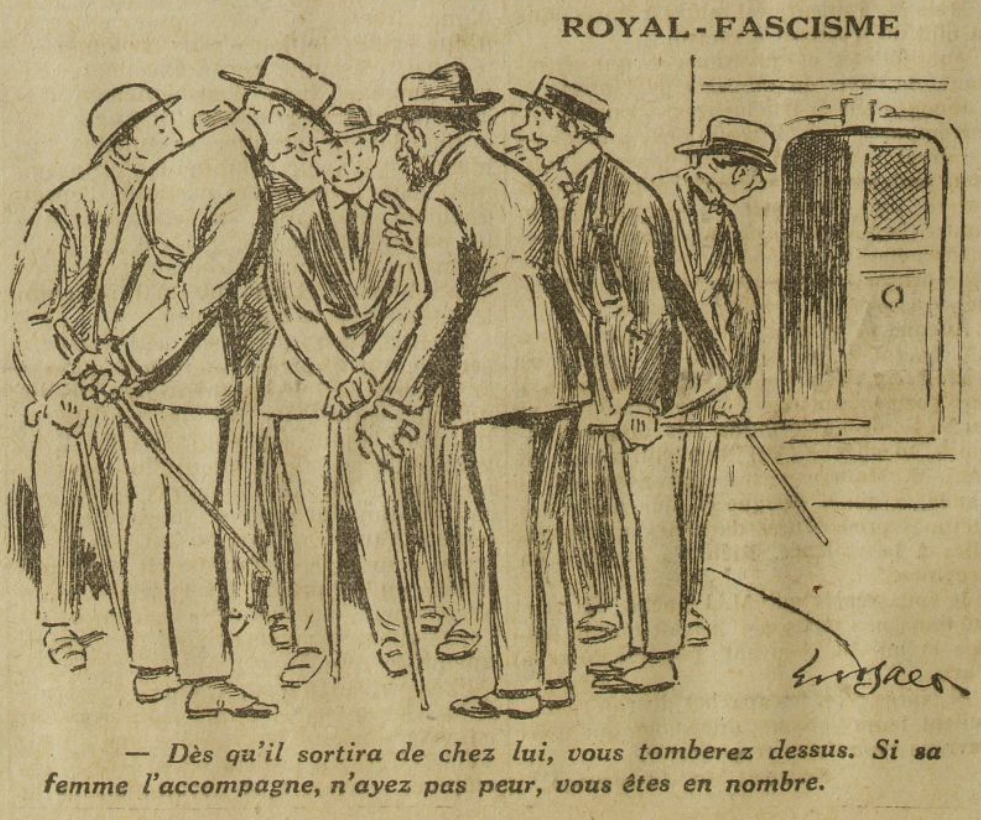
Satire on the King's Camelots, known for their violent actions.

Action française logo.

In this society, where different regimes have succeeded one another since 1789, several members of this family chose to remain loyal to royalist ideals, despite the gradual rallying of Aveyron and Catholics to the republican regime. This public commitment began during the French Revolution, and it is this memory that continues to express itself into the twentieth century. It spanned four generations and more than a century. On April 24, 1917, in the eight hundred and thirteenth list of its “In the Field of Honor” column, the newspaper L'Action française wrote: “The de Barrau family, the honor of Catholic and royalist Rouergue, counted six combatants at the start of the war. At present, three have died for France; three are still facing the enemy.”

=== Recent and current times ===
After the deaths of Raymond and Fernand de Barrau in 1931 and 1938, there were no new notables in the family. The notability from the 19th century lost its power with the upheavals of the two world wars. Following the fighting in the First World War, Fernand de Barrau lost three of his four sons (Jean and Paul in battle, Roger as a result of his wounds after the war), while his cousin Guy de Barrau, a former Salmiech town councilor, lost one of his two sons (Louis in battle). Of the six young Barrau men, four died.

Today, some of its members can be found in a society directory. (Note: Refer to past and present editions of the Bottin mondain.)

In 1972, one of its members became a member of Charles de Gaulle's family (Paris branch). (Note: Michel de Barrau married Brigitte de Gaulle on April 1, 1972 (see the de Gaulle family genealogy in this encyclopedia).)

The de Barrau family is a surviving member of the French nobility. Some of its members have been members of the Association d'entraide de la noblesse française [The French Nobility Mutual Aid Association] since 1992. (Note: Their name appears in the list of families admitted to the Association d'entraide de la noblesse française on the association's website.)

The current Carcenac Château is owned by Gilles Séguret, son of Geneviève de Barrau, who has lived there since 1995. (Note: See PDF Solidarité et fraternité au cœur de la crise [Solidarity and fraternity at the heart of the crisis] from Rodez.catholique.fr, Vivre ici, n°7, December 2020, page 7, article by Anne-Marie Pagès. This site seems to have drawn on the Wikipedia article for information on the history of the de Barrau family. Note also that Anne-Marie Pagès gives Guion de Barrau the profession of notary, whereas no profession is mentioned for this character in Bernard Chérin's genealogy (Chérin 15, BNF).)

In the 21st century, bearers of the name are members of the Société des lettres, sciences et arts de l'Aveyron, (Note: Refer to the various minutes of the Société des lettres, sciences et arts de l'Aveyron from 1837 to the present day for the years concerned.) or still live in the area.

According to the genealogy presented by various authors, this was a small family from the Ancien Régime. Two observations can also be made from this genealogy, namely a fairly large number of men with no descendants, and very few clergymen and nuns (one prior in the 16th century, one priest (rector of a parish), and two nuns in the 18th century, one priest in the 20th/early 21st century).

In 2002, Régis Valette listed 14 male bearers of the name in the agnatic line (in the male line without adoption).

Alliances and noble relations are few and far between. For alliances: van den Brande (1904), de Grenier de Lassagne (1927), de Cockborne (2001), de Gérard du Barry and de Saint-Quentin (2001). For close relatives: d'Avout (1931).

== Genealogy ==
This genealogy is based on the various sources cited in the bibliography of this article.

I) Firmin (Note: Given name to be confirmed.) (I) Barrau, notary in the 16th century, among other children:

II) Firmin (II) Barrau, bourgeois, from Salmiech, (Note: As mentioned above, Hippolyte de Barrau may have mistakenly listed a certain Dufieu as his notary and/or the date 1572. Among the children of Firmin II Barrau with Françoise de Méjanès is a son named Arnaud, which recalls the first name of his grandfather Arnaud de Méjanès (see the articles on the de Barrau and de Méjanès families in Hippolyte de Barrau's book on the families of Rouergue).) married in the 16th century Françoise de Méjanès, daughter of Arnaud de Méjanès, lord of Larguiez, who was captain of the Creyssel Château, which he defended against Huguenot attacks (correspondence of 1559), and Gabrielle Mazières. Among their children:

1: Firmin Barrau, who follows.

2: Laurens Barrau, father to a non-noble branch mentioned at Coutal, parish of Notre-Dame d'Aures, whose female descendants are still living there. (Note: Laurens Barrau, brother of Firmin III Barrau, married Catherine Costes, and their children were Antoine, Jacques, Louis, Bernard, Marie and Louise. In 1660, Antoine, Jacques and Bernard Barrau are mentioned in an agreement between them and their first cousin, noble Guion de Barrau, écuyer, de Carcenac, concerning legitimate rights to the estate known as “Le Coutal”. Le Coutal lies on the edge of Lake Pareloup, where in the 17th century there was only a tower or fortified house (the remains are incorporated in reconstructions that are still in place today). Laurens Barrau and his descendants are buried in the church of Notre-Dame-d'Aures. He was lord of the parish and his estate covered a third of the parish of Notre-Dame-d'Aures (to the east, the Rieutord stream and the road from Routaboul to Salles-Curan, to the south, the village of Routaboul, to the west, the Roucan stream (Ventrin until the 20th century), and beyond, the land up to the parish church of Notre-Dame-d'Aures, and to the north, the Viaulou river). Antoine de Barrau, husband of Françoise de Chabbert, had the following children: Guillaume Barrau (no descendants) and Catherine Barrau (no descendants). Source of the information presented in this note: Société des lettres, sciences et arts de l'Aveyron (Le Coutal, F11 bis n°108). These archives contain the lawsuit brought by Guion de Barrau against Antoine de Barrau, his cousin and owner of Coutal, to claim a different division because his father, Firmin III, had, he claimed, been disadvantaged by their grandfather Firmin II, hence the agreement on legitimate rights (In 1660 Série E : p.450 (1660) (E.2006. (Register) In-4°, 146 sheets, paper - Inventory of AD12, Henri Affre) “passed between noble Guion de Barrau, esquire, of Carcenac, on the one hand, Antoine de Barrau du Coutal, parish of Aures, and Jacques and Bernard Barrau, his brothers, on the other hand”. At the time of the French Revolution, the descendant of Laurens was the most prominent figure in the commune of Arvieu, having married Françoise de Vedelly (or de Védelly), and his son would later marry the granddaughter of an Empire baron (Pierre de Cabrol de Mouté). Remarkably, during the second half of the 18th century and the first half of the 19th century, there were just under two generations at Coutal in a single century: all Laurens Barrau's descendants practiced at Coutal as notaries, royal notaries and expert phaeodists until 1910. Laurens' other children: Marie married Thomas Cambefort (de Villefranche de Panat), Bernard married Antoinette Cambefort (de Villefranche de Panat), Jacques had no descendants, Louis married Marie Clémens, heiress of Mas de Roussel (Les Faux d'Arvieu), whose female descendants had no descendants, Louise married Jean Massol (d'Arvieu) and received part of Coutal.)

III) Firmin (III) Barrau, married in 1611 to Marie de Faramond, daughter of François de Faramond and Louise de Lapanouse. François de Faramond was the eldest of his line and the son of Jean de Faramond de La Faramondie and Marguerite de Morlhon. Louise de Lapanouse is the daughter of Guion de Lapanouse, seigneur de Fabrègues et de Grèzes, and Helips de Brezons. The marriage pacts were made at the Tower of Caplongue. Among their children:

IV) Guion de Barrau (1613-1703). (Note: First name reminiscent of Guion de Lapanouse, father of Louise de Lapanouse, wife of François de Faramond, who was Guion de Barrau's maternal grandfather.) In 1656 his first wife Anne de Vedelly, daughter of Jean de Vedelly and Isabeau de Moyssety, brought him half the seigneury of Trémouilles with high, medium, and low justice. He calls himself a nobleman and squire. On October 9, 1666, he was condemned as a usurper of nobility. He remarried in 1667 to Louise Desplas, daughter of Jean Desplas, lawyer, and Barbe de Combret. He was taxed as a noble in 1695. He was maintained noble on September 19, 1699. Among other children:

V) Firmin (IV) de Barrau (1663-1739), lord of Puech, Caplongue, co-lord of Trémouilles, married Anne de Flavin on October 20, 1680, daughter of Pierre de Flavin, lord of La Capelle-Viaur, who was commissioned by King Louis XIV to fight the Camisards in the Cévennes, and Gabrielle de Séguy, lady of Las Maries. In 1689, 1692, and 1694, he took part in the campaigns of the Rouergue nobility. In 1691, he was given command of a local militia. He was taxed as a noble in 1695. He was maintained a nobleman in 1701 and 1716. In 1709, he purchased the seigneury of Caplongue with the right of medium justice. In his will, in 1738, he wrote that he wished to be buried in the Notre-Dame chapel of the Carcenac church. Among his children:

VI) Pierre Firmin de Barrau (1681-1761), lord of Frayssinous, of Caplongue, co-lord of Trémouilles, married by contract on June 18, 1730, to Françoise de Faramond, daughter of Jean Jacques de Faramond, lord of Canet, lord baron of Jouqueviel, who was appointed commissioner of nobility for the election of Rodez by King Louis XV in 1739, and of Élisabeth de Michau. In 1737, he was subject to the noble capitation tax. On the eve of the French Revolution, Barrau de Fraissinous appears in the list of those subject to the noble twentieth in Rouergue. Among his children:

1: Pierre Firmin de Barrau (1731-1816), lord of Caplongue, musketeer in King Louis XV's second company then captain of dragoons. (Note: Hippolyte de Barrau mistakenly writes that he was a gray musketeer. Benoît Defauconpret writes that the second company, known as the black musketeers (color of the horses), is more sought-after than the first company, known as the gray musketeers, and the musketeer corps, like the bodyguard corps, is part of the cavalry of the King's household.) In 1789, he was secretary and one of the editors of the cahier de doléances of the nobility of the bailiwicks of Rodez and Millau. He emigrated to Germany in January 1792 and served in that year's campaign as a platoon leader in the first infantry company of the Guyenne coalition. He returned to France on May 3, 1805, and died in 1816.

2: Jean Antoine de Barrau (1737-1798), who follows.

3: Pierre Joseph de Barrau (1743-1788), lord of Saint-Igest, father to a branch established in Quercy and extinguished in the male line in the 20th century. He was a bodyguard to King Louis XV in 1762 then a lawyer in parliament, married in Bretenoux to Anne Claudine Gindre (1738-1782), whose descendants, among other children, are: N... de Barrau Saint-Igest, who emigrated to Spain, where he served for a long time as an officer; and Augustin de Barrau (1771-1794), who volunteered for the Army of the Western Pyrenees in 1792, and “quickly rose through the lower ranks”, becoming brigade commander in 1794 in the corps commanded by Bon-Adrien Jeannot de Moncey, and crushed to death at the age of 23.

VII) Jean Antoine de Barrau (1737-1798), high, middle, and low co-lord of Trémouilles, etc., married by contract on May 22, 1759, to Françoise Pauline de Solages, daughter of high and mighty lord Antoine Paulin de Solages, knight, marquis of Carmaux, etc., former page to the king in his Grande Écurie, and of Françoise Marie Guionne de La Roque-Bouillac, only daughter of Charles de La Roque-Bouillac, the baron of Bar, and Charlotte de Ciron. After his wife's escape, he circumvents his father-in-law to have her arrested by lettre de cachet. As a gentleman, he is registered on the roll for the capitation of the nobility. On November 1, 1793, his château in Carcenac was looted and burned by a detachment of the Lot revolutionary army. Imprisoned, he was released only after his son took his place on March 1, 1794, and was subsequently sought again. Children:

1: Pierre Firmin Marie de Barrau, who follows.

2: Victoire Pauline Eulalie de Barrau (1763-1844), married in 1782 to Marc Antoine de Balsac, lord of Colombiès, captain in the Vexin regiment, knight of Saint-Louis, son of André de Balsac, lord baron of Firmi, member of the Toulouse parliament, and Marie Josèphe de Madrières. Among their children, there is Auguste de Balsac (1788-1880), Prefect (1817), Commander of the Legion of Honor (1827), Secretary General of the Ministry of the Interior (1828), State Councillor (1828), Member of Parliament, etc.

VIII) Pierre Firmin Marie de Barrau (1761-1829) was four years old when his mother was abducted and arrested. He first served in the Vexin regiment from 1779 to 1783, and in the same year joined the bodyguards of King Louis XVI (first the company of Noailles in 1783, then the Scottish company in 1788), where he remained until his dismissal in 1789. In 1790, he married Marguerite Dablanc, daughter of Pierre Dablanc, a lawyer in Rodez, and Paule Henriette de Morlhon. He was forced into hiding for several months during the French Revolution. In 1794, along with his father, he was summoned to appear before the Revolutionary Tribunal. At the end of the Revolution, during the Directoire period (1795-1799), Pierre de Barrau moved his family to Rodez and began rebuilding the family home at Carcenac. In 1803, under the Consulate, he enriched his village church with art furniture from the Cordeliers de Rodez convent, which had been slated for destruction, and also from the Bonnecombe abbey. At the beginning of the 19th century, he was a notable figure in the canton of Cassagnes. From 1811, he was mayor of the commune of Saint-Sauveur (Aveyron). In 1814, on the return of the Bourbons to the throne of France, he was awarded the Lily. His children include:

1: Auguste de Barrau (1792-1848), the last to be born in his family's former château, burnt down in 1793. Enrolled in the École spéciale militaire de Saint-Cyr (artillery section) on January 6, artillery lieutenant (July 1, 1813). From 1813 to 1814 he was part of the Grande Armée and took part in the defense of Erfurt, in 1815 of the Army of the Rhine and took part in the Süffelbach and Bergen affairs, in 1823 of the Army of Spain and took part in the blockade of San Sebastian, the attack on Rochapea and the siege of Pamplona, knight of Saint-Ferdinand of Spain (October 19, 1823), artillery captain (February 22, 1831), knight of the Legion of Honor (May 5, 1833), artillery squadron commander (November 26, 1843) and artillery commander at Mont-Dauphin. He died after 36 years of uninterrupted service while commanding the artillery at the citadel of Cette.

2: Hippolyte de Barrau (1794-1863), from Saint-Cyr, bodyguard to King Louis XVIII, officer, prefecture councilor then general secretary of the Aveyron prefecture, historian, genealogist, memorialist, and naturalist. He was the initiator, one of the founders and first president of the Société des lettres, sciences et arts de l'Aveyron. He launched La Gazette du Rouergue. Knight of the Faith, Knight of the Legion of Honor, St. Helena Medalist.

3: Eugène de Barrau (1801-1887), notable, political essayist, historian, memorialist (1832-1862). He launched the Écho de l'Aveyron. Involved in the Legitimist movement, in 1852 he was entrusted by French royalist leaders with a confidential mission to the “Comte de Chambord”.

4: Adolphe de Barrau, who follows.

IX) Adolphe de Barrau (1803-1884), physician, naturalist and herbalist, member of the Commission d'exploration scientifique d'Algérie, one of the founders of the Société des lettres, sciences et arts de l'Aveyron, member of learned societies, married Marguerite Mignonac in 1845. Their children included:

1: Raymond de Barrau (1847-1931), an officer in the Garde Mobile (1870-1871 war), Doctor of Law in 1875, he was a lawyer at the Court of Appeal of Paris before being appointed deputy public prosecutor in Mirande and then Condom, a position from which he resigned in 1880 to protest against the expulsion of the Christian Congregations in France. Reserve officer in the territorial infantry. In 1879, he married Louise Rouquette, whose descendants remain.

2: Fernand de Barrau (1851-1938), a man of letters, translator, columnist, essayist, historian, agronomist, from 1886 to 1901 editor-in-chief of the Journal de l'Aveyron, member of learned societies. In 1888, he married Henriette Fabre, whose descendants remain. His children include Jean de Barrau (1889-1914), an Action française militant, who slapped a teacher for anti-militarist remarks, a member of the steering committee of the national federation of King's Camelots, private secretary to the “Duke of Orléans” from February to August 1914, reported missing in the early days of mobilization, died in combat.

3: Paul de Barrau (1891-1916), King's Camelot, founder and president of an Action française group in Rodez in 1909, awarded the Croix de Guerre with commendation, died in combat.

== Alliances ==
Some dates of marriages within the de Barrau family on all its branches: de Méjanès (16th century, 1755), de Faramond (1611, 1730), Costes (17th century), de Grimal (1647), de Vedelly (1656, 1760), de Janson (before 1660), de Chabbert (17th century), d'Assier de Tanus (1674), de Moly (1675), de Bonnafos de Scorailles (1676), de Flavin (1680), de Davy (1685), de Trédolat (1750), de Solages (1759), Gindre (18th century), de Balsac-Firmy (1782), Dablanc (1790), Manzon (1839), Mignonac (1845), de Lavernhe (1872), (Note: Family belonging to the French bourgeoisie.) Rouquette (1879), de Maribail (1886), Fabre (1888), van den Brande (1904), (Note: Mercédès van den Brande, daughter of Hector van den Brande, squire (granted nobility in 1887 by the King of the Belgians), and Marguerite de Méautis, wife of Guy de Barrau (L'Éventail, October 16, 1904).) de Grenier de Lassagne (1927), (Note: Sources: social directories including the Bottin mondain and the ANF directory, Geneanet, Roglo.) Sarrauste de Menthière (1931), Niel (1932), Cabille (1968), de Gaulle (1972), Séguret, Le Poittevin de La Croix de Vaubois, Fabre, Wattecamps, Teisseire (1996), Savary de Beauregard, de Cockborne (2001), de Gérard du Barry and de Saint-Quentin (2001).

== Coats of arms ==
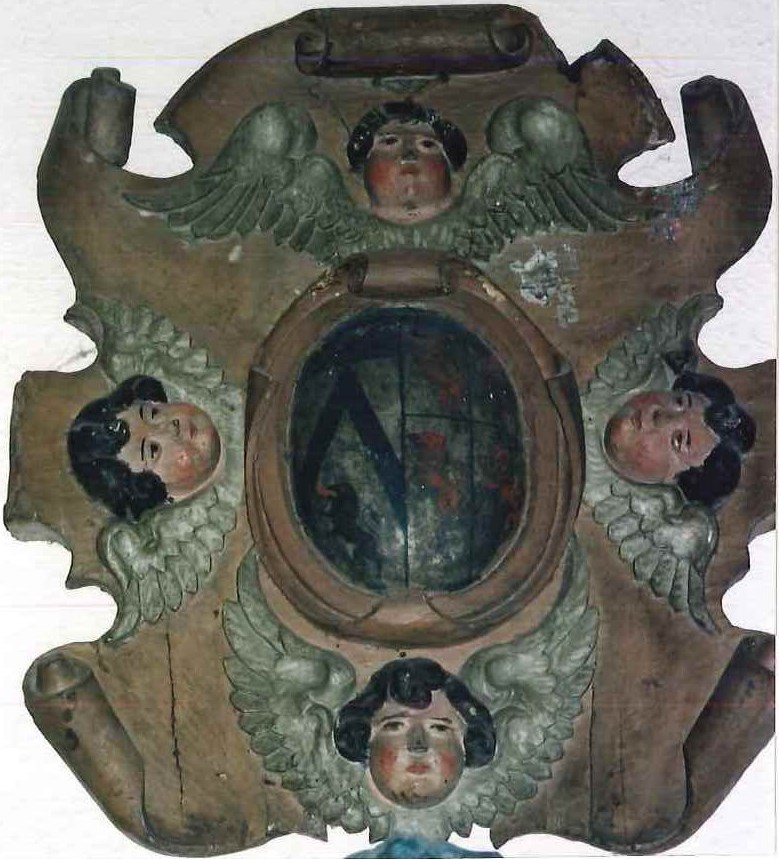
De Barrau family coat of arms.

Pierre Hocquellet, author of Armorial général du Rouergue dressé par Charles d'Hozier en vertu de l'édit de novembre 1696, édition critique des manuscrits conservés à la Bibliothèque nationale de France [General Armorial of Rouergue drawn up by Charles d'Hozier in accordance with the edict of November 1696, critical edition of the manuscripts held at the Bibliothèque nationale de France], published in 2009, writes: “Several 18th-century seals are engraved with the arms of this family [de Barrau] as Barrau [historian Hippolyte] gives them at the head of the notice he dedicated to it [H. de Barrau, Documents sur les familles du Rouergue..., tome 4, page 95] (Departmental Archives of Aveyron cotes E156 and 60J13: cf. drawings by J. Poulet, Bull. du C.G.R., no. 6 (1993), page 15 and no. 25 (1998), pages 22-23)”.

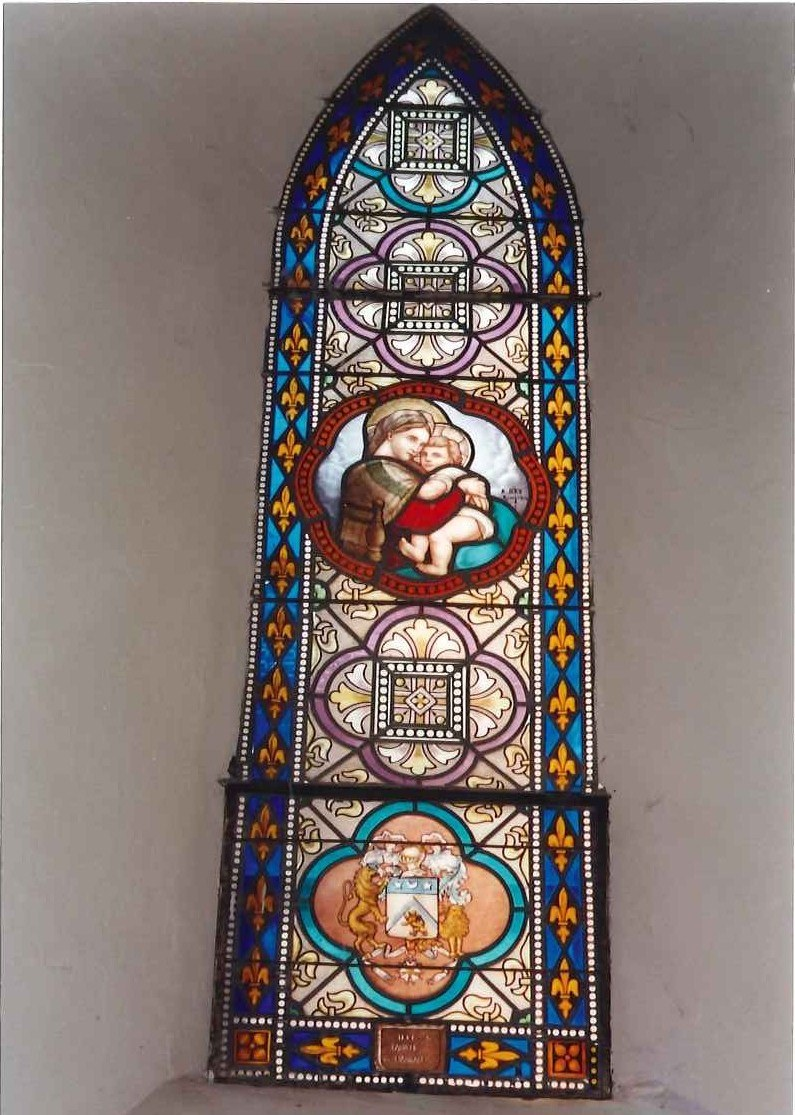
Stained glass window with the Barrau family coat of arms (error in the color of the lion, which should have been red) in Carcenac church.

Guillaume de Barrau (one of the sons of Pierre Firmin de Barrau and Françoise de Faramond), Lord of Le Besset, used three seals with the following arms in 1733-1737: “Quarterly four lions (count's crown)’; ’Azure a lion, on a chief three mullets (count's crown)’; ’Two flames, in base a crescent moon, on a chief gules three mullets (marquis's crown)”.

Around 1755, Pierre Firmin de Barrau de Caplongue used the following seal: “A chevron with a lion in base, on a chief of azure a crescent and two stars”.

In 1783, Pierre de Barrau told D'Hozier de Sérigny that his coat of arms included a lion and a chevron.

The first publication to mention it was an anonymous article in the Mémoires de la Société des lettres, sciences et arts de l'Aveyron, published in 1847: “Argent a lion rampant gules, armed and lampassed likewise under a chevron azure; on a chief azure a crescent and two argent stars”. In 1860, Hippolyte de Barrau specified that the shield was “stamped with a burnished silver helmet, set and tared to one side, showing two-thirds of the visor and with five bars” and gave as support “two lions, one rampant and the other set and contoured, the other having half its body behind the shield”.

== Places linked to the history of the de Barrau family in Rouergue ==
- In the town of Rodez: a commemorative plaque on the house where Hippolyte de Barrau was born and an avenue Hippolyte de Barrau;
- In the village of Carcenac: a house (rebuilt after the Revolution); a square named after Hippolyte de Barrau; in the village church, a stained-glass window featuring an engraving of his arms and a commemorative plaque, in memoriam, of family members killed in the First World War, which was affixed in the same chapel as the stained-glass window;
- In the village of Trémouilles: the coat of arms of this commune, of which the de Barrau family was co-lord from 1656 to 1789, features the silver background and the gules lion that are part of the family's coat of arms.
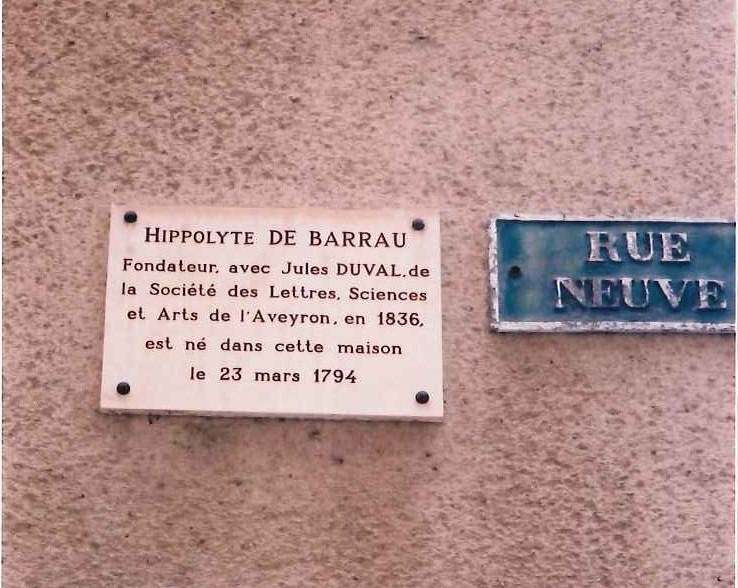
In Rodez, Rue Neuve, plaque affixed to the house where Hippolyte de Barrau was born.

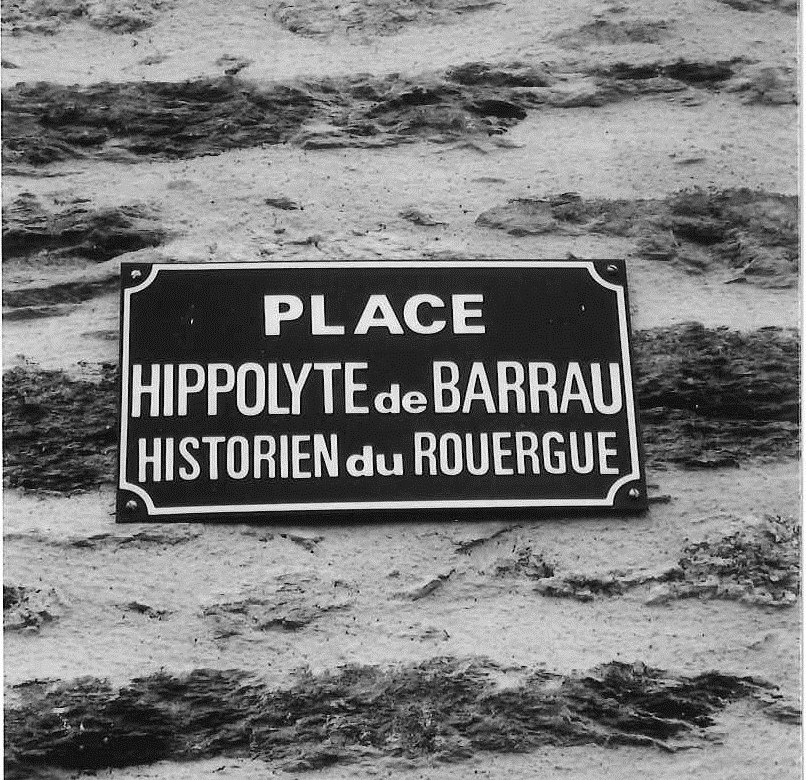
In Carcenac, square in front of the church.

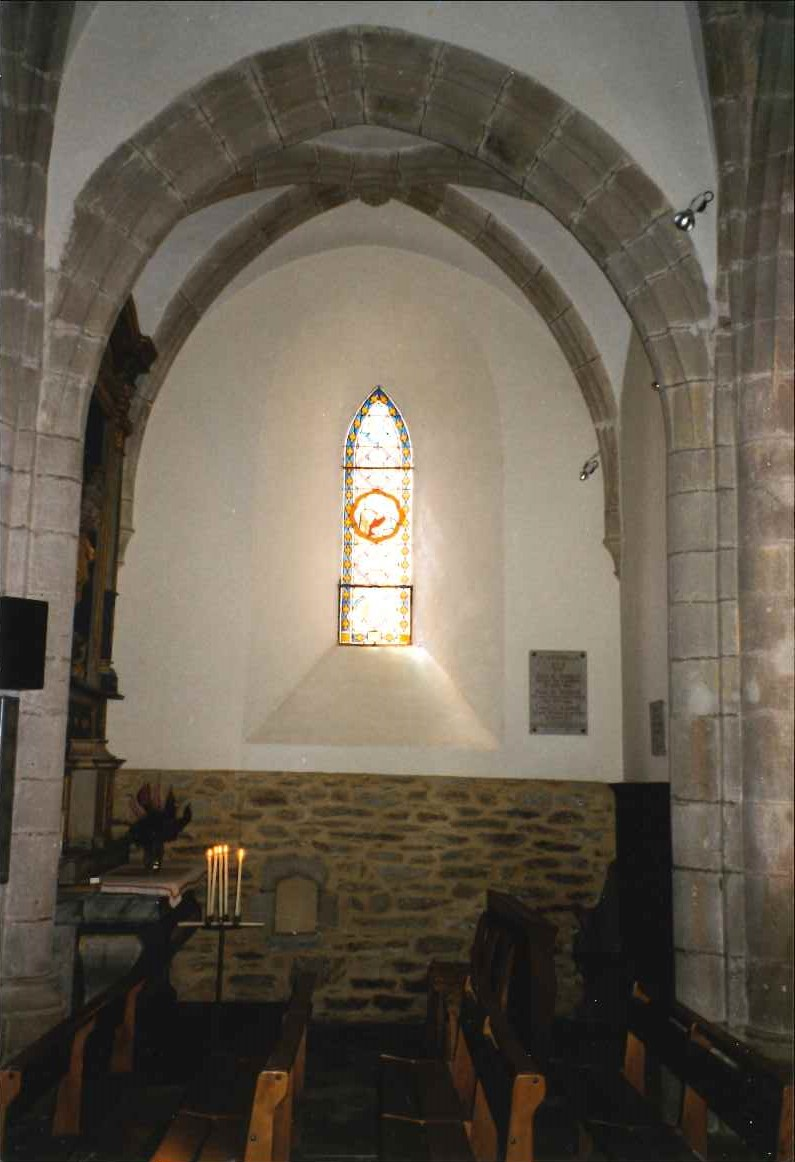
Chapel of Notre-Dame or of the Virgin, or Chapel of the de Barrau family in the Saint-Étienne church in Carcenac. It was in this chapel that noble Firmin de Barrau (1663-1739) asked to be buried.

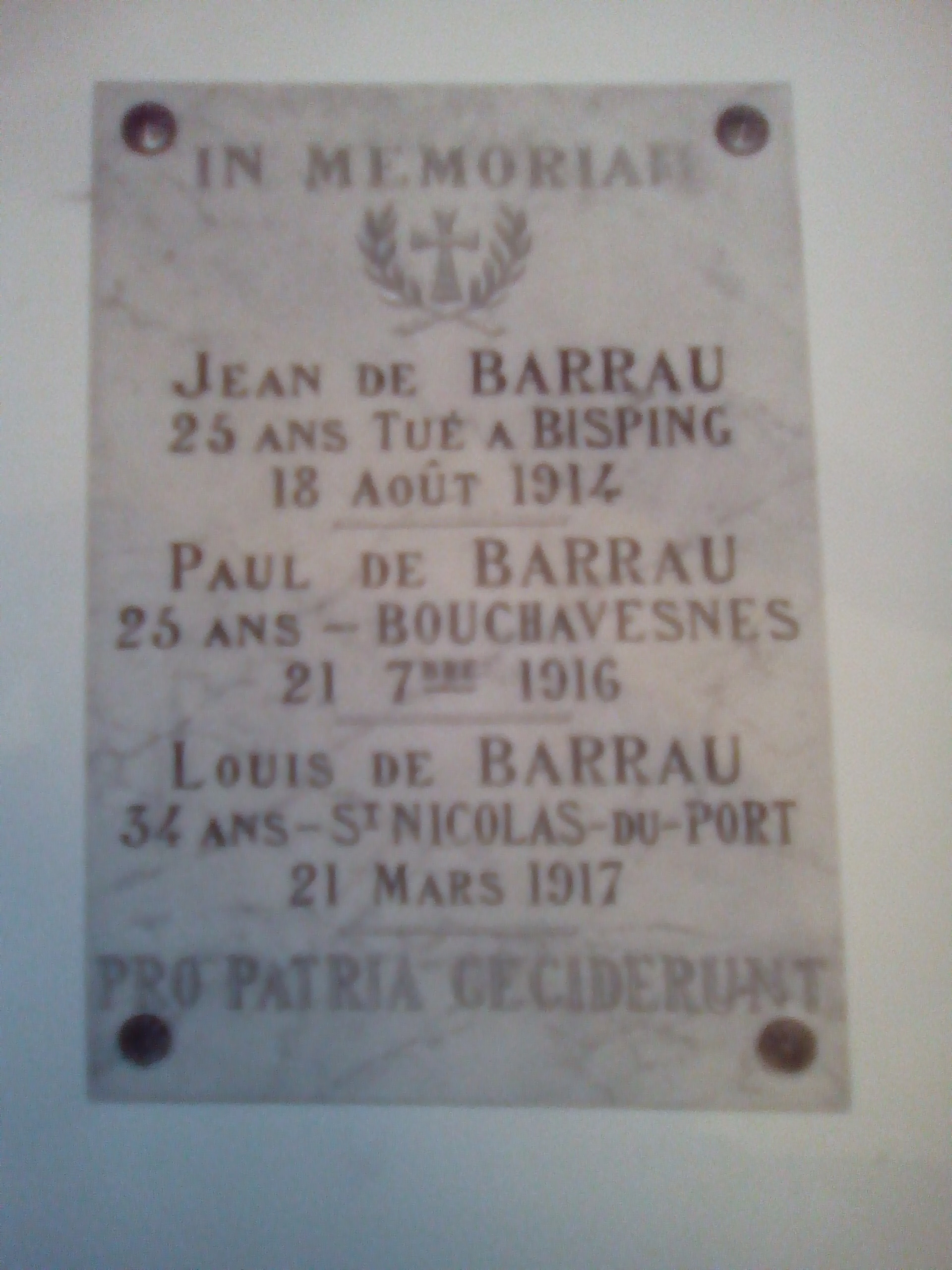
Commemorative plaque in this same chapel.

Official coat of arms of the commune of Trémouilles (adopted by the municipality in 2009), Aveyron.

== Other memorabilia ==
Several members of the de Barrau family contributed to the history of Rouergue in the 19th century. Hippolyte and Adolphe de Barrau initiated and helped found the Société des lettres, sciences et arts de l'Aveyron in 1836. The writing of works on the history of Rouergue by Hippolyte, Eugène, and Fernand de Barrau. The launch of two Legitimist newspapers: La Gazette du Rouergue (1831-1836) by Hippolyte de Barrau, and L'Écho de l'Aveyron (1845-1863) by Eugène de Barrau.

== See also ==
- French nobility
- Nobles of the Sword
- Aveyron
- Rouergue

== Bibliography ==
- Affre, Henri (1877). Inventaire-sommaire des Archives départementales de l'Aveyron antérieures à 1790, archives civiles, série E (N° 1 à 2036) [Summary inventory of the Departmental Archives of Aveyron prior to 1790, civil archives, series E (N° 1 to 2036)] (in French). Paris: Imprimerie et librairie administratives de Paul Dupont.
- de Barrau, Hippolyte (1853–1860). Documents historiques et généalogiques sur les familles et les hommes remarquables du Rouergue dans les temps anciens et modernes [Historical and genealogical documents on notable families and men of Rouergue in ancient and modern times] (in French). Rodez: N. Ratery. Archived from the original on 2023-04-20.
- Bedel, Henry (August 14, 1934). "Le visage d'un prince français" [The face of a French prince]. L'Action française (in French).
- Bedel, Henry (September 15, 1935). "Les trois historiens de Barrau" [The three de Barrau historians]. Le Courrier du Centre (in French). ISSN 2124-8605.
- Bedel, Henry (1919). Figures Rouergates : Jean de Barrau, Paul de Barrau, Paul Fabre, Henri Fabre de Montbez, morts au champ d'honneur [Figures from Rouergue: Jean de Barrau, Paul de Barrau, Paul Fabre, Henri Fabre de Montbez, killed in action] (in French). Rodez: Carrère.
- de Bonald, Joseph Marie Jacques Ambroise (1902). Documents généalogiques sur des familles du Rouergue [Genealogical documents about Rouergue families] (in French). Rodez: Carrère. Archived from the original on 2025-08-18.
- Bousquet, Henri (1934). Inventaire des Archives du Château de Vezins [Inventory of the Château de Vezins Archives] (in French). Rouergue: Commission des Archives Historiques du Rouergue.
- Chaix d'Est-Ange, Gustave (1903–1929). Dictionnaire des familles françaises anciennes ou notables à la fin du XIXe siècle [Dictionary of old or notable French families at the end of the 19th century] (in French). Vol. 20. Paris: Évreux. Archived from the original on 2024-12-24.
- Jougla de Morenas, Henri (1934). Grand armorial de France [Great armorial of France] (PDF) (in French). Vol. 1. Paris. Archived from the original on 2022-03-09.
- de Framond, Martin (1986). Fonds de Faramond [Faramond fund] (in French). Rodez: Archives départementales de l'Aveyron.
- Vigarié, Émile (1927). Esquisse générale du département de l'Aveyron, publiée, sous les auspices du Conseil général, des chambres de commerce de Rodez et de Millau et de la Société centrale d'agriculture de l'Aveyron : « Les frères de Barrau » [General survey of the Aveyron département, published under the auspices of the Conseil général, the Rodez and Millau chambers of commerce and the Société centrale d'agriculture de l'Aveyron: “The de Barrau brothers”] (in French). Rodez: Carrère.
- Pujo, Maurice (June 30, 1913). "Jean de Barrau" [Jean de Barrau]. L'Action française (in French). Archived from the original on December 27, 2024.
- Pujo, Maurice (October 26, 1916). "Au Champ d'Honneur" [In Flanders Fields]. L'Action française (in French). Archived from the original on December 28, 2024.
- Pujo, Maurice (March 13, 1938). "M. Fernand de Barrau" [Mr. Fernand de Barrau]. L'Action française. Archived from the original on December 28, 2024.
- Verlaguet, Pierre-Aloïs (1918). Cartulaire de l'abbaye de Bonnecombe [Cartulary of the Abbey of Bonnecombe]. Archives historiques du Rouergue (in French). Vol. 1. Rodez: Carrère.
- Vignau, Jean; et al. (ed.) (1998). Nobiliaire des généralités de Montauban et d'Auch, et du pays de Foix.... T. I, Jugements de A à F : dressé sur titres originaux réunis par les intendants lors de la recherche des usurpateurs du titre de noblesse entre 1696 et 1718 [Nobiliary of the generalities of Montauban and Auch, and the country of Foix.... T. I, Judgments from A to F: drawn up from original titles collected by intendants during the search for usurpers of the title of nobility between 1696 and 1718.] (in French). Biran: Histoire et familles du Sud-Ouest. ISBN 2-9512489-1-1.
- de Barrau, Eugène; et al. (ed.) (2007). Les chemins d'une vie : carnets intimes d'un notable aveyronnais (1832-1862) [The paths of a life: diaries of a notable Aveyron man (1832-1862)]. Archives historiques du Rouergue (in French). Vol. 27. Rodez: Société des lettres, sciences et arts de l'Aveyron. ISBN 978-2-908570-11-3.
- Hocquellet, Pierre (2009). Armorial général du Rouergue dressé par Charles d'Hozier en vertu de l'édit de novembre 1696, édition critique des manuscrits conservés à la Bibliothèque nationale de France (ms.fr. 32207 et 32208) [General Armorial of Rouergue drawn up by Charles d'Hozier in accordance with the edict of November 1696, critical edition of manuscripts held at the Bibliothèque nationale de France (ms.fr. 32207 and 32208)] (in French). Rodez: Cercle généalogique du Rouergue: Amis du Musée du Rouergue. ISBN 978-2-9534335-0-0.
- de Saint-Simon, Fernand; de Séréville, Étienne (1975). Dictionnaire de la noblesse française [Dictionary of French nobility] (in French).
- Valette, Régis (2002). Catalogue de la noblesse française subsistante [Catalog of surviving French nobility] (in French).
