= Trémouilles =

Commune in Occitanie, France

- Commune
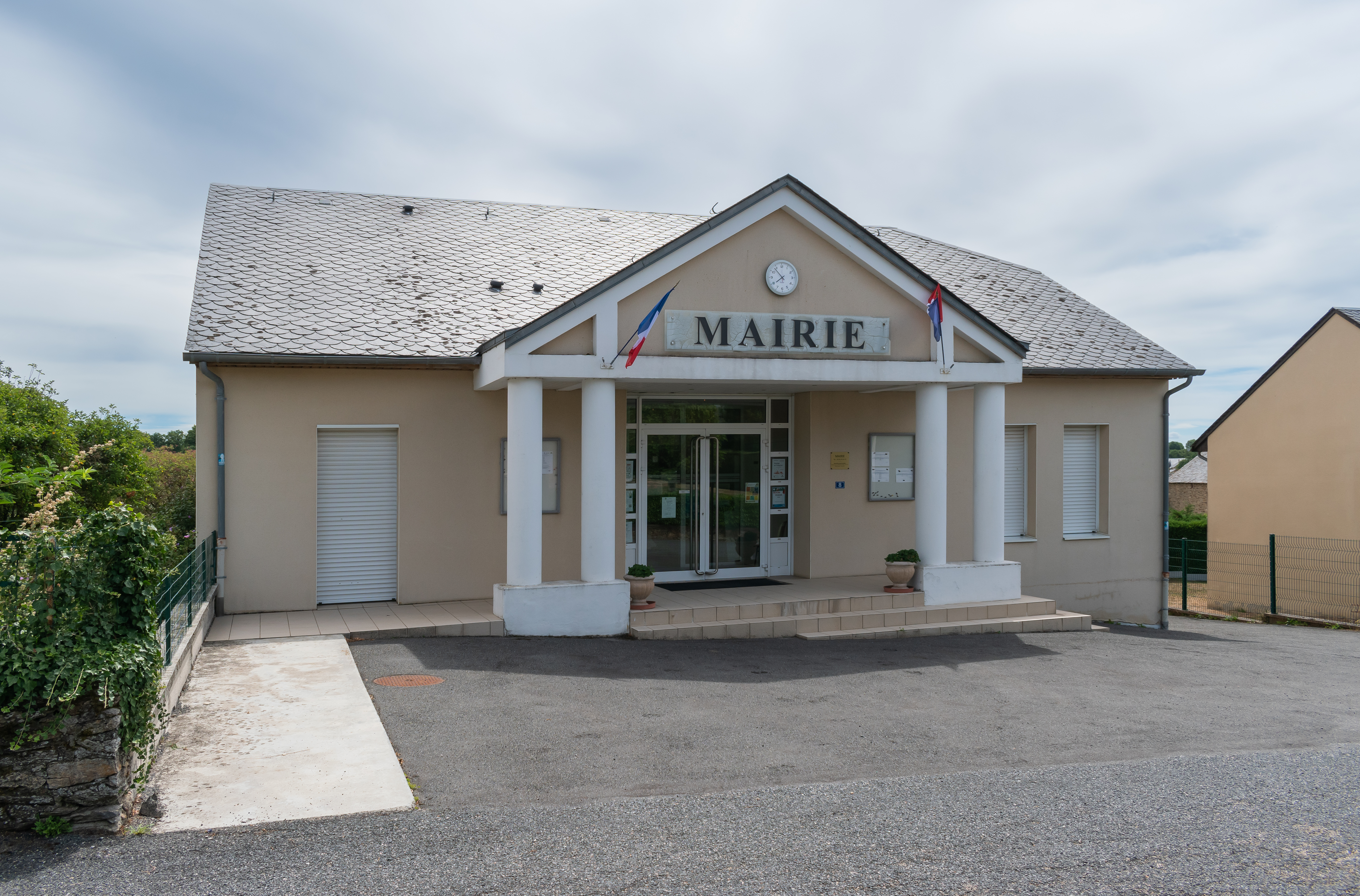
- Town hall of Tremouilles

- Coat of arms
- Location of Trémouilles
- Location within France Location within Occitanie
- Coordinates: 44°14′43″N 2°38′42″E
- Country: France
- Region: Occitania
- Department: Aveyron
- Arrondissement: Millau
- Canton: Raspes et Lévezou
- Intercommunality: Pays de Salars

Government
  - Mayor (2020–2026): Joël Vidal
- Area^{1}: 28.83 km^{2} (11.13 sq mi)
- Elevation: 800 m (2,600 ft)
- Highest elevation: 871 m (2,858 ft)
- Lowest elevation: 533 m (1,749 ft)
- Population (2023): 473
  - Density: 16.4/km^{2} (42.5/sq mi)
- Time zone: UTC+01:00 (CET)
  - Summer (DST): UTC+02:00 (CEST)
- INSEE/Postal code: 12283 /12290
- ^{1} French Land Register data, which excludes lakes, ponds, glaciers > 1 km^{2} (0.386 sq mi or 247 acres) and river estuaries.

Trémouilles (French pronunciation: [tʁemuj]; Occitan: Tremolhas) is a commune in the Aveyron department in southern France.

== Population ==
Historical population
Year	Pop.	±% p.a.
1968	709	—
1975	626	−1.76%
1982	546	−1.93%
1990	503	−1.02%
1999	504	+0.02%
2007	526	+0.54%
2012	508	−0.69%
2017	504	−0.16%
2023	473	−1.05%
Source: INSEE

== See also ==
- Communes of the Aveyron department
