= Ambeyrac =

Commune in Occitanie, France

- Commune
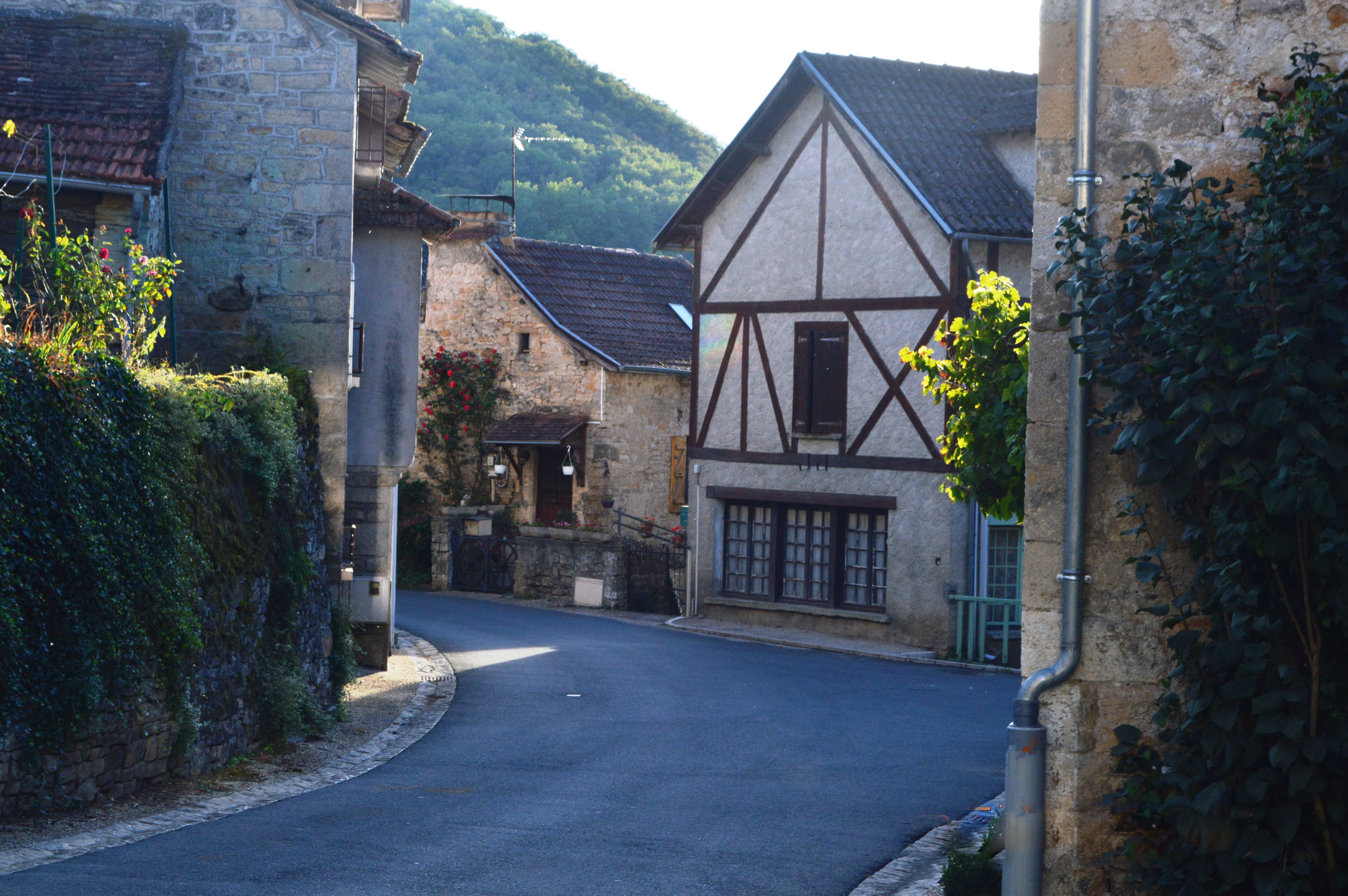
- A street in Ambeyrac
- Location of Ambeyrac
- Location within France Location within Occitanie
- Coordinates: 44°30′38″N 1°56′41″E
- Country: France
- Region: Occitania
- Department: Aveyron
- Arrondissement: Villefranche-de-Rouergue
- Canton: Villeneuvois et Villefranchois
- Intercommunality: Ouest Aveyron Communauté

Government
  - Mayor (2020–2026): Marie-José Doucet
- Area^{1}: 11.24 km^{2} (4.34 sq mi)
- Elevation: 163 m (535 ft)
- Highest elevation: 344 m (1,129 ft)
- Lowest elevation: 141 m (463 ft)
- Population (2023): 184
  - Density: 16.4/km^{2} (42.4/sq mi)
- Time zone: UTC+01:00 (CET)
  - Summer (DST): UTC+02:00 (CEST)
- INSEE/Postal code: 12007 /12260
- ^{1} French Land Register data, which excludes lakes, ponds, glaciers > 1 km^{2} (0.386 sq mi or 247 acres) and river estuaries.

Ambeyrac (French pronunciation: [ɑ̃beʁak]; Occitan: Ambairac) is a commune in the Aveyron department in the Occitanie region of southern France.

== Geography ==
Ambeyrac is located some 15 km south-west of Figeac and 25 km north-west of Villefranche-de-Rouergue with its northern border being the border between the departments of Aveyron and Lot. It can be accessed by the D86 road from Balaguier-d'Olt in the north-east which passes through the village and continues south to La Capelle-Balaguier. The minor D127 road also goes west from the village to Saujac.

The northern border of the commune is formed entirely by the Lot river for which there are no crossing points in the commune. The Ruisseau de Flaucou flows from the south through the commune and the village to join the Lot.

== Administration ==
List of successive mayors

From	To	Name
2001	2009	Roland Théron
2009	2014	Émilie Cazajus
2014	2020	Marie-Thérèse Chapeau
2020	2026	Marie-José Doucet

Due to the death of Roland Théron, Émilie Cazajus was elected mayor in 2009.

== Population ==
The inhabitants of the commune are known as Ambairacois or Ambairacoises in French.

Historical population
Year	Pop.	±% p.a.
1968	214	—
1975	198	−1.10%
1982	192	−0.44%
1990	167	−1.73%
1999	191	+1.50%
2007	177	−0.95%
2012	180	+0.34%
2017	174	−0.68%
2023	184	+0.94%
Source: INSEE

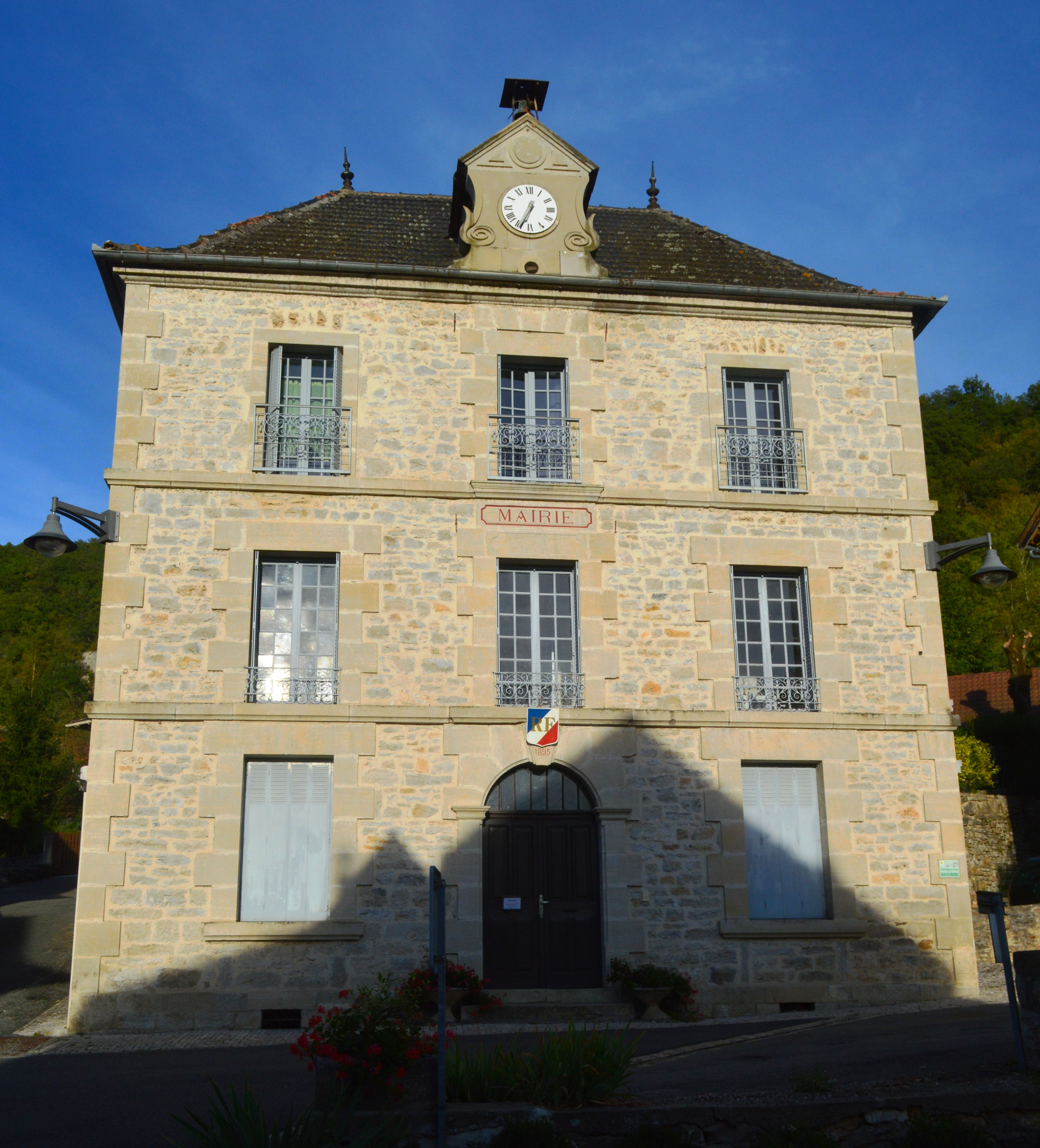
The Town Hall

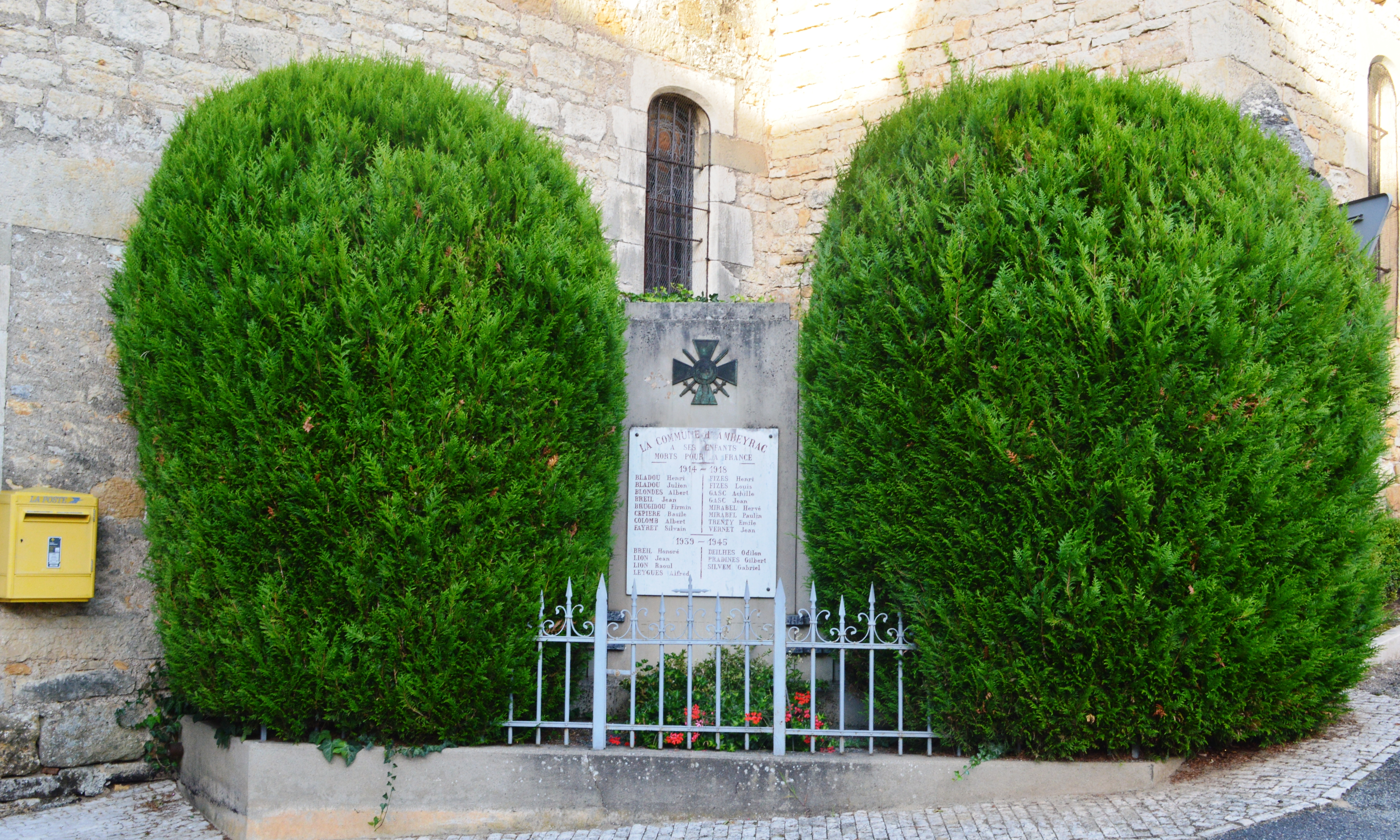
Ambeyrac War Memorial

== Sites and monuments ==
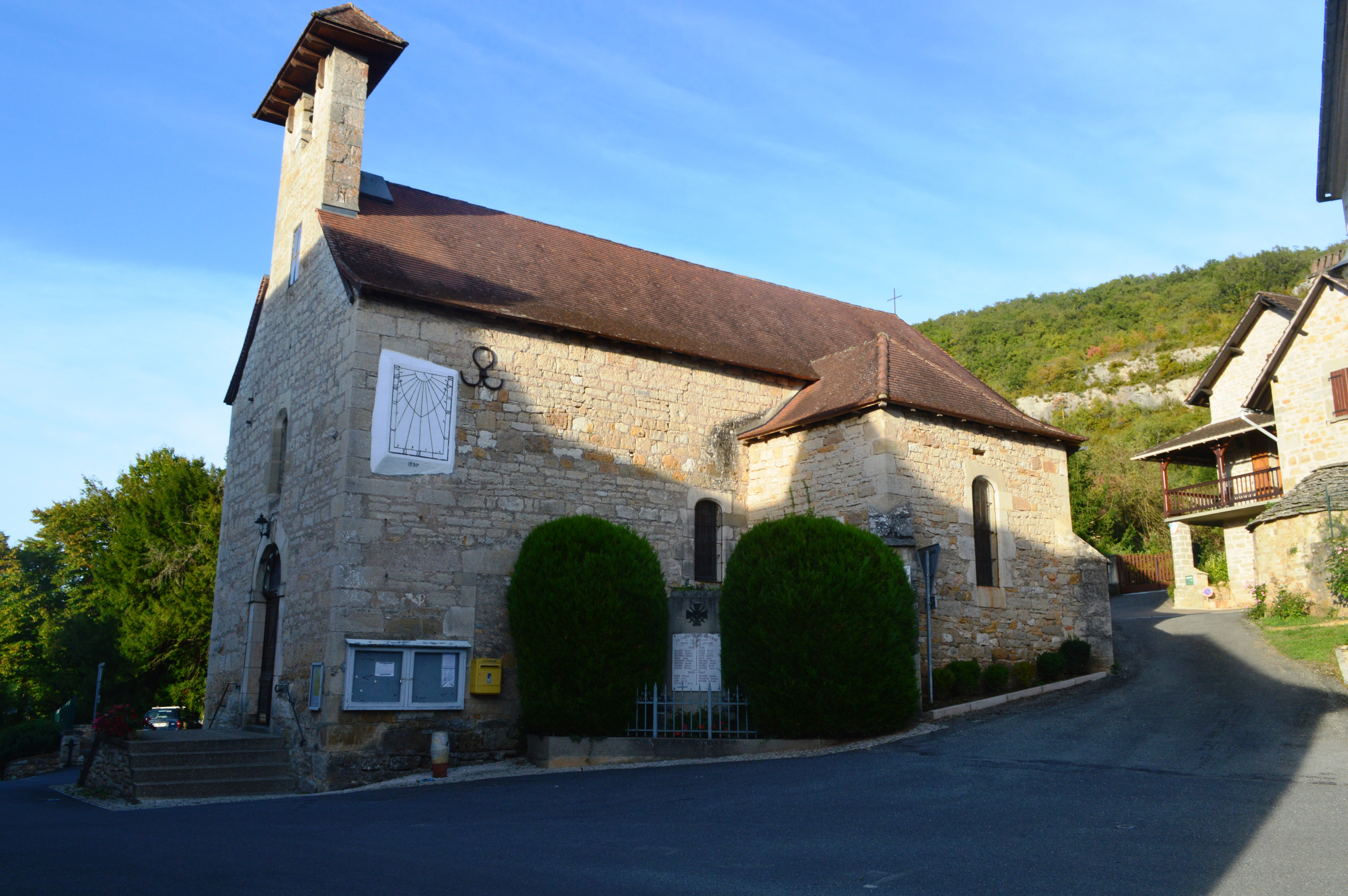
Ambeyrac Church

- The Chateau of Camboulan (16th century) is registered as an historical monument.
- A tithe barn has been converted into a hall with two levels.

Church interior

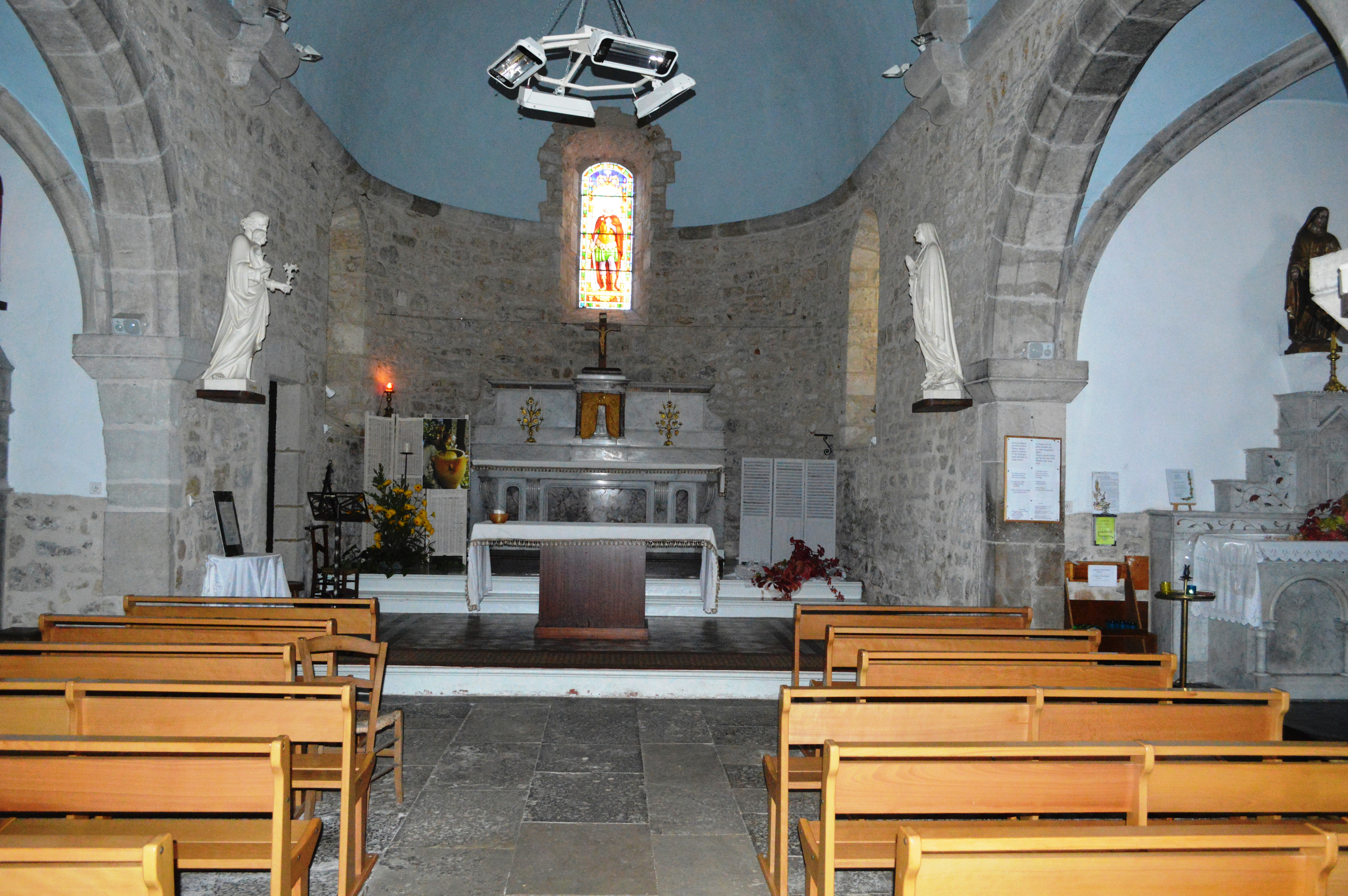
Church interior

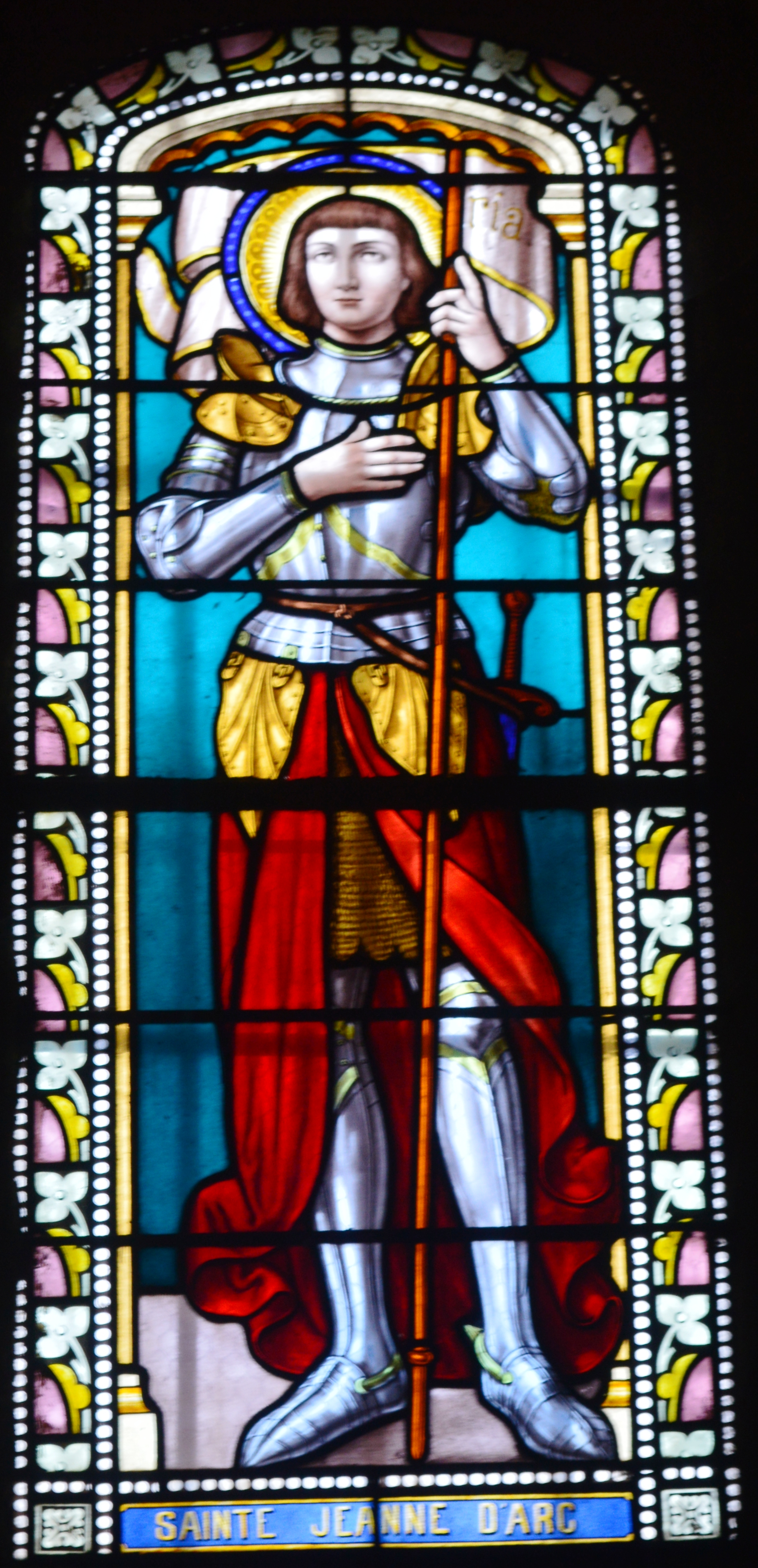
Stained glass - Joan of Arc

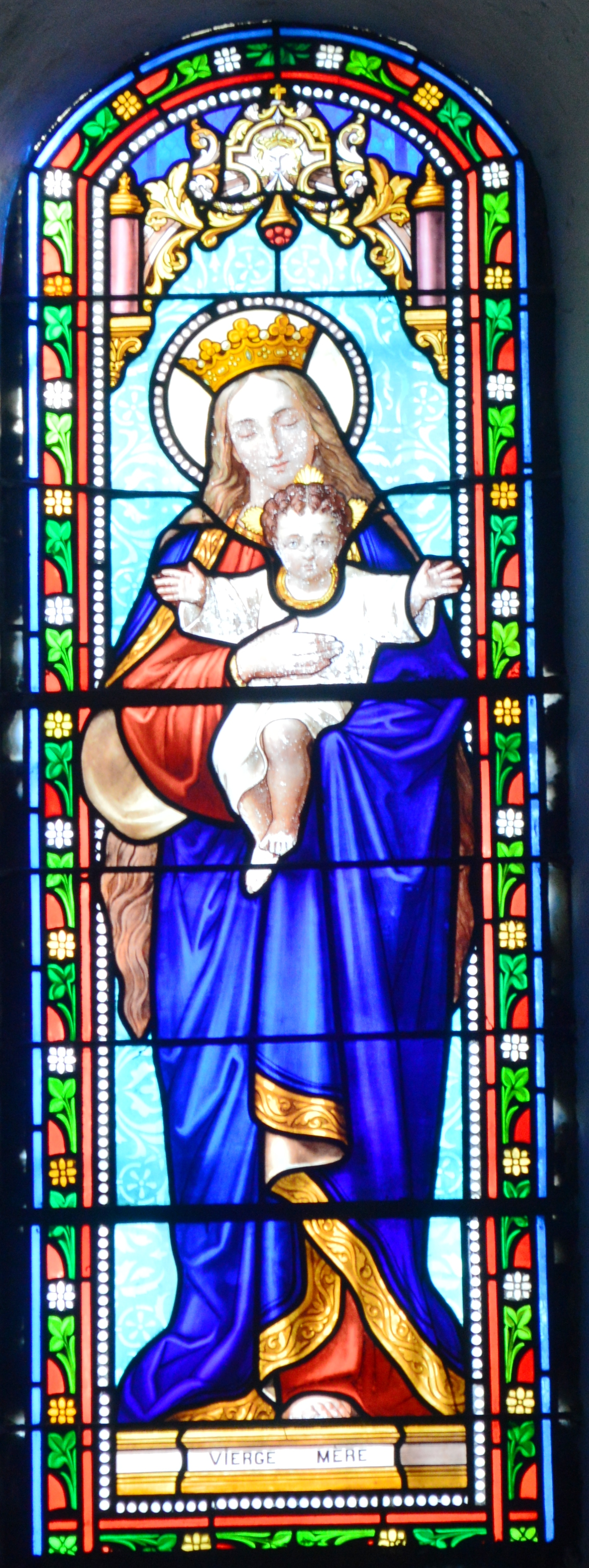
Stained glass - Virgin and child

== See also ==
- Communes of the Aveyron department

=== Bibliography ===
- Christian-Pierre Bedel (preface by Raymond Audouard), Vilanòva: Ambairac, La Capèla, Montsalés, Òls, Sanch-Igèst, Santa-Crotz, Sent-Remèsi, Sauvanhac, Saujac / Christian-Pierre Bedel e los estatjants del canton de Vilanòva, Rodez, Mission départementale de la culture, coll. Al canton, 1995, ill., cov. ill. 28 cm, 247 p. (ISBN 2-907279-23-8, ISSN 1151-8375, BnF FRBNF36688568) (in French)
