= Anglars-Saint-Félix =

Commune in Occitanie, France

- Commune
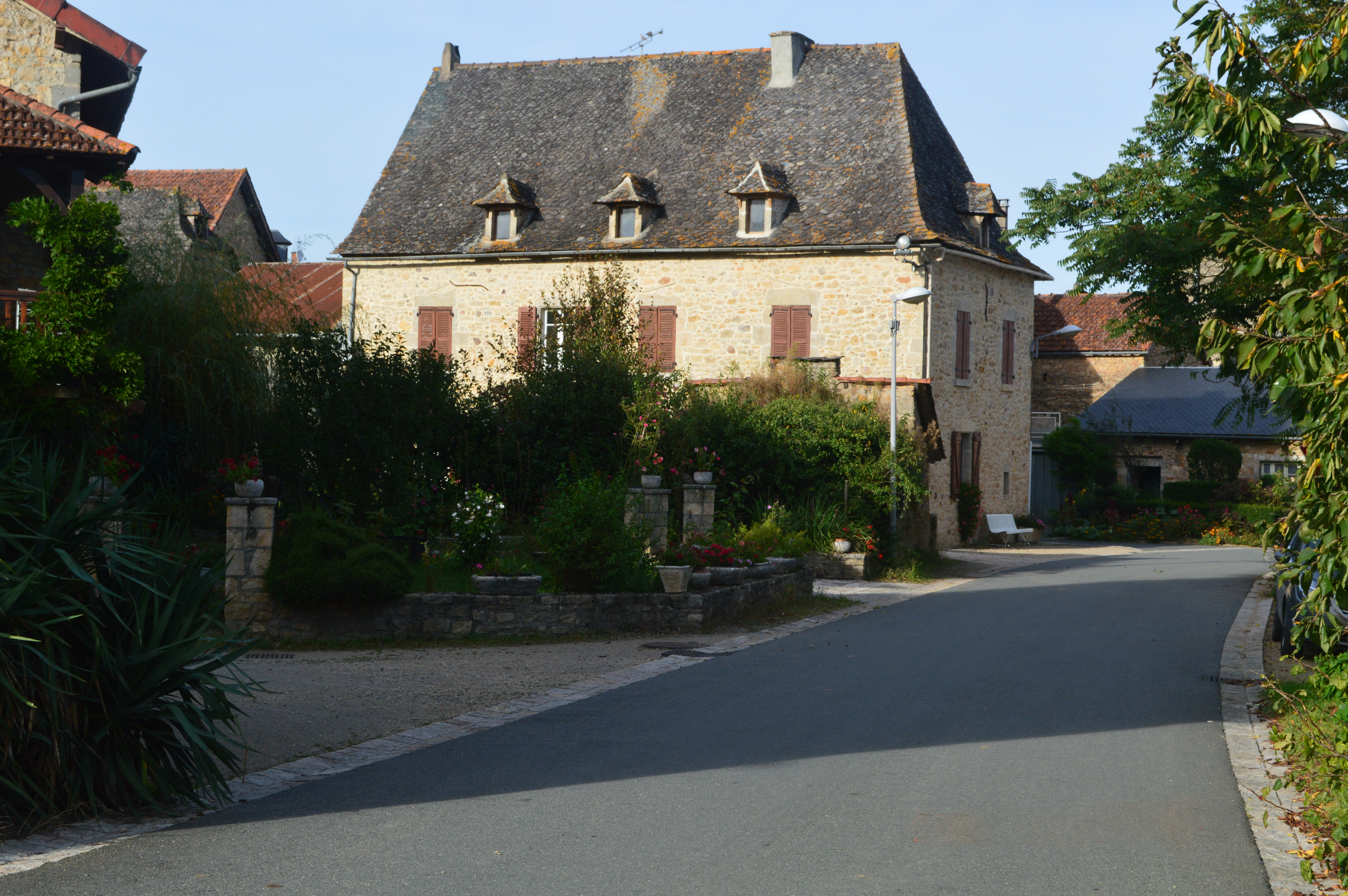
- A street in Anglars-Saint-Félix
- Location of Anglars-Saint-Félix
- Location within France Location within Occitanie
- Coordinates: 44°25′27″N 2°13′09″E
- Country: France
- Region: Occitania
- Department: Aveyron
- Arrondissement: Villefranche-de-Rouergue
- Canton: Enne et Alzou
- Intercommunality: Pays Rignacois

Government
  - Mayor (2020–2026): Dominique Rouquette
- Area^{1}: 22.22 km^{2} (8.58 sq mi)
- Elevation: 400 m (1,300 ft)
- Highest elevation: 615 m (2,018 ft)
- Lowest elevation: 446 m (1,463 ft)
- Population (2023): 930
  - Density: 42/km^{2} (110/sq mi)
- Time zone: UTC+01:00 (CET)
  - Summer (DST): UTC+02:00 (CEST)
- INSEE/Postal code: 12008 /12390
- ^{1} French Land Register data, which excludes lakes, ponds, glaciers > 1 km^{2} (0.386 sq mi or 247 acres) and river estuaries.

Anglars-Saint-Félix (Languedocien: Anglars de Rinhac) is a commune in the Aveyron department in the Occitanie region of southern France.

== Geography ==
Anglars-Saint-Félix is located some 20 km north-east of Villefranche-de-Rouergue and 30 km west by north-west of Rodez. It can be accessed by road D1 from Lanuéjouls to the village which then continues to the eastern border of the commune where it changes to the D994 and continues east to Rodez. There is also the D61 road from Prévinquières in the south to the village then continuing north to join the D994 west of Roussennac. The D156 also goes from the village to Privezac in the west. Apart from the village there are also the hamlets of:

- Anglares
- Aubignac
- La Bezonie
- La Bonnaurie
- Le Bruel
- La Carreyrie
- Lespeliguie
- Linrezie
- La Remise
- Revel
- Saint-Felix
- Segala
- Le Tronc

The rest of the commune is entirely farmland.

The commune is traversed by the Alzou river through the centre from east to west. Many tributaries join the Alzou including the Ruisseau de la Besade from the north, the Ruisseau de Filloise and the Ruisseau de Carbonnieres from the south.

== Administration ==
List of Successive Mayors

Mayors from the French Revolution to 1929

From	To	Name	Party	Position
1791	1793	Antoine Lacout		
1793	1796	Jean Couffin		
1796	1803	Jean-Pierre Vernhes		
1803	1812	Jean Bricard		
1812	1816	Jean Viguié		
1816	1830	Jean Couffin		
1830	1838	Jean Viguié		
1838	1860	Augustin de Colonge		
1860	1869	Amans Thibon		
1869	1869	Henri Davet		Acting Assistant
1869	1869	Barthélémy Viguié		
1869	1876	Pierre Rey		
1876	1876	Hippolyte Maurel		
1876	1878	Hippolyte Couffin		
1878	1883	Barthélémy Viguié		
1883	1884	Barthélémy Marty		Acting 1st Adviser
1884	1888	Antoine Ginestat		
1888	1892	Joseph Couffin		
1892	1929	Jean Aussibal		

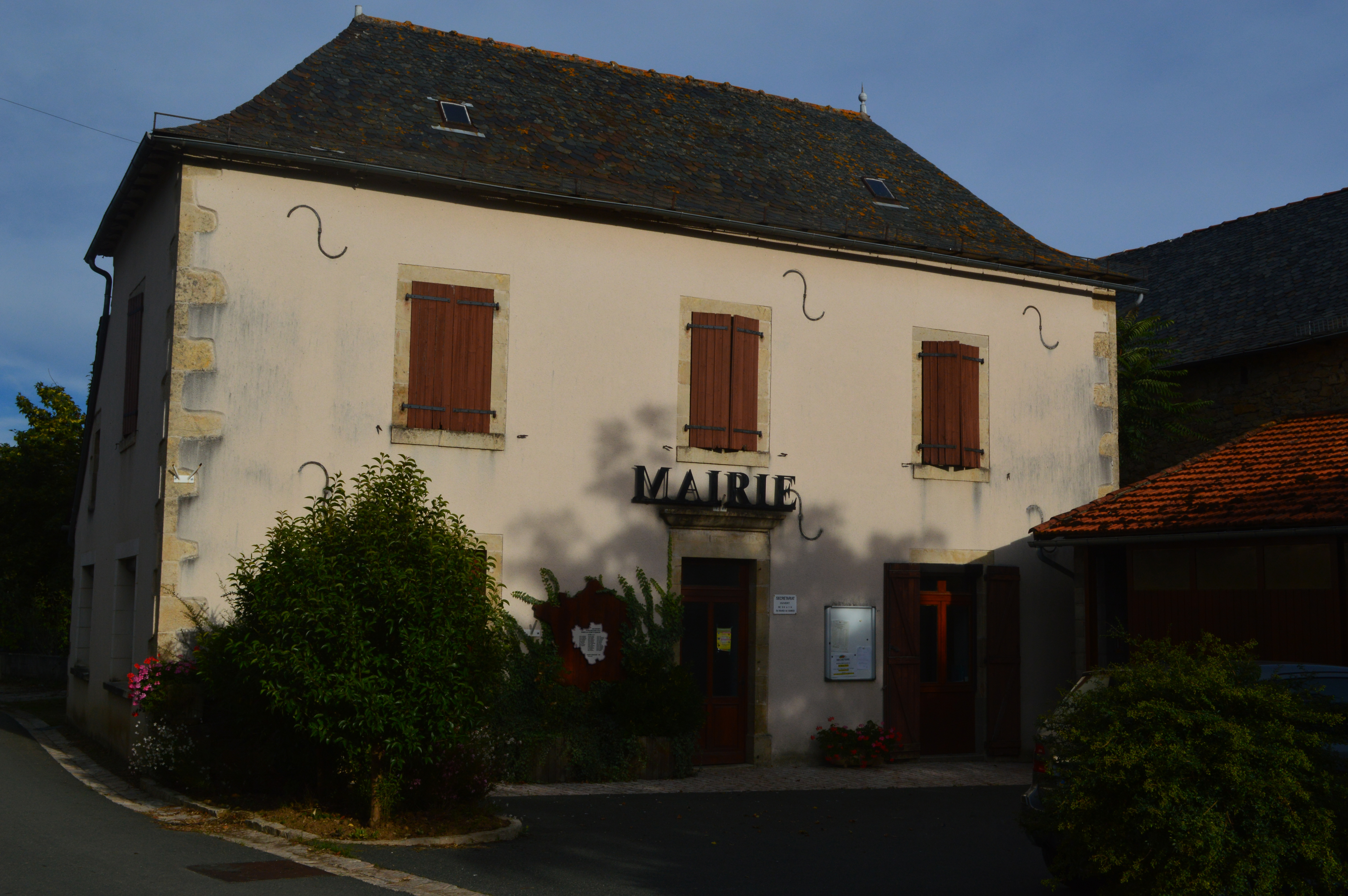
The Town Hall

Mayors from 1929

From	To	Name	Party
1929	1953	Henri Couffin	
1953	1964	Marcel Costes	
1964	1965	Maurice Bourdy	
1965	1977	Joseph Bastide	
1977	1994	Jean Pomier	
1995	2005	Raymond Bastide	DVD
2005	2026	Dominique Rouquette	DVD then UDI

== Population ==
The inhabitants of the commune are known as Anglélixois or Anglélixoises in French.

Historical population
Year	Pop.	±% p.a.
1968	701	—
1975	655	−0.96%
1982	620	−0.78%
1990	579	−0.85%
1999	562	−0.33%
2007	599	+0.80%
2012	754	+4.71%
2017	820	+1.69%
2023	930	+2.12%
Source: INSEE

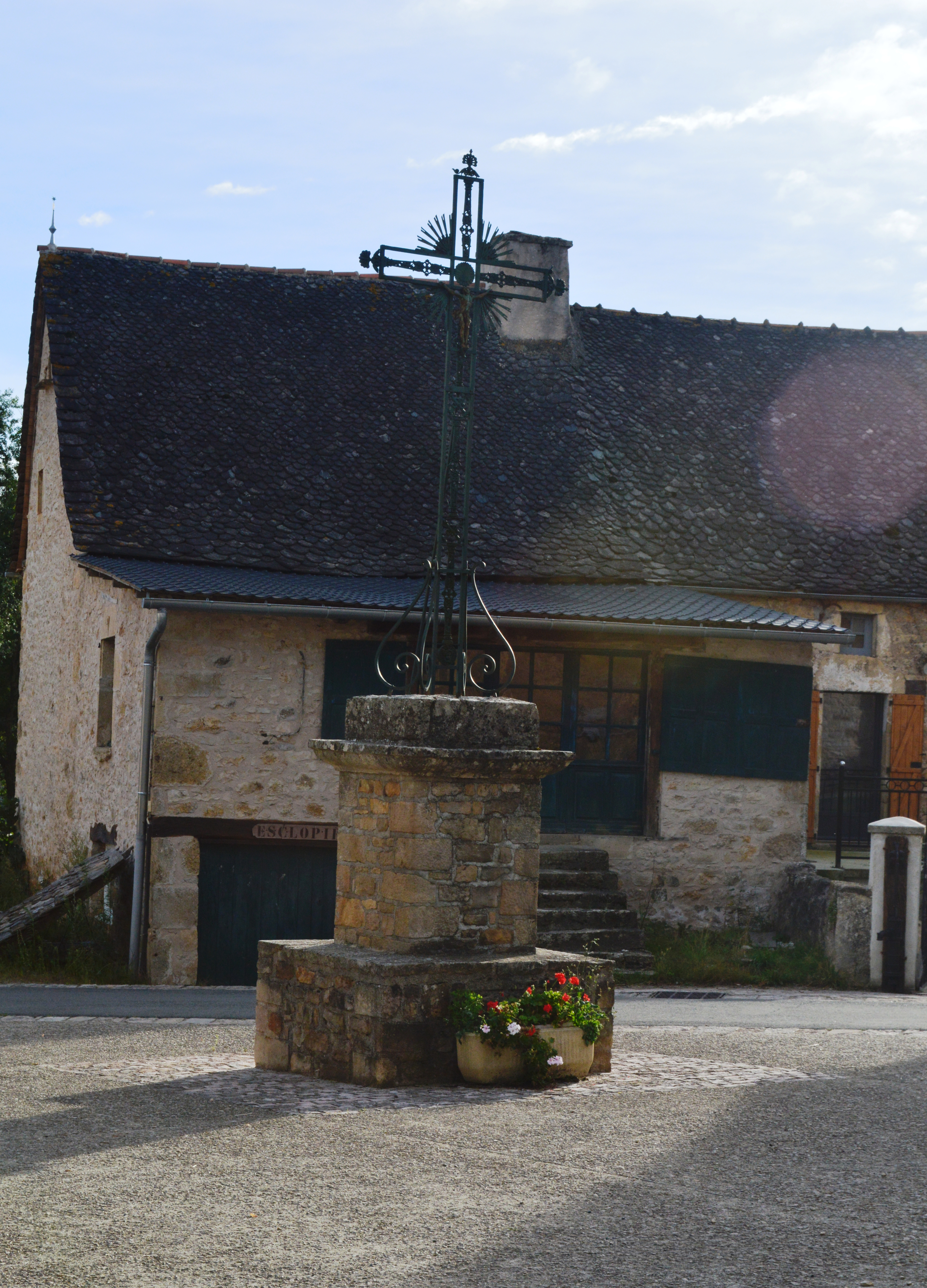
A Wayside Cross in Anglars-Saint-Félix

== Sites and Monuments ==
- The Church of Saint Clair has three items that are registered as historical objects:
  - A Baptismal font (17th century)
  - A Stoup (17th century)
  - A Cabinet for the baptismal font (17th century)

== Cultural events and festivities ==
The village fair is held on the first Sunday of June.

For 23 years, as part of its votive festival, the village of Anglars has transformed into a living museum. 250 extras dress at this time for an afternoon to reenact life a century ago. There is also the revival of old crafts, scenes of life, typical characters in the life of a village, teams of oxen, horses, baking bread etc. To see this reconstruction viewers move through the village from scene to scene and at any time can become actors. Admission is free.

In 2013 about 7,000 people came to the festival with 5,000 on the Sunday. Each time of year had its activities: haymaking and threshing in summer; cider, chestnuts and corn in the autumn; in the evening: frittons and hemp work in winter, sheep shearing and Palm Sunday blessings in spring. Fifty skits depict these events and also old trades and essential works that are made every year. The musical program is varied throughout the weekend: traditional dancing and a concert with Brick a drac (Festive Occitan) on Friday, banda and dancing with the band Utopia (variety rock) on Saturday, and Escloupeto (folk group) accordion orchestra with David Firmin and a recital by Andre Roques (the author of "My Aveyron") with their singer on Sunday. All concerts are free including the show on Sunday.

== See also ==
- Communes of the Aveyron department
