= Arrondissement of Villefranche-de-Rouergue =

Coordinates: 44.35°N 2.05°E

Villefranche-de-Rouergue
- Arrondissement
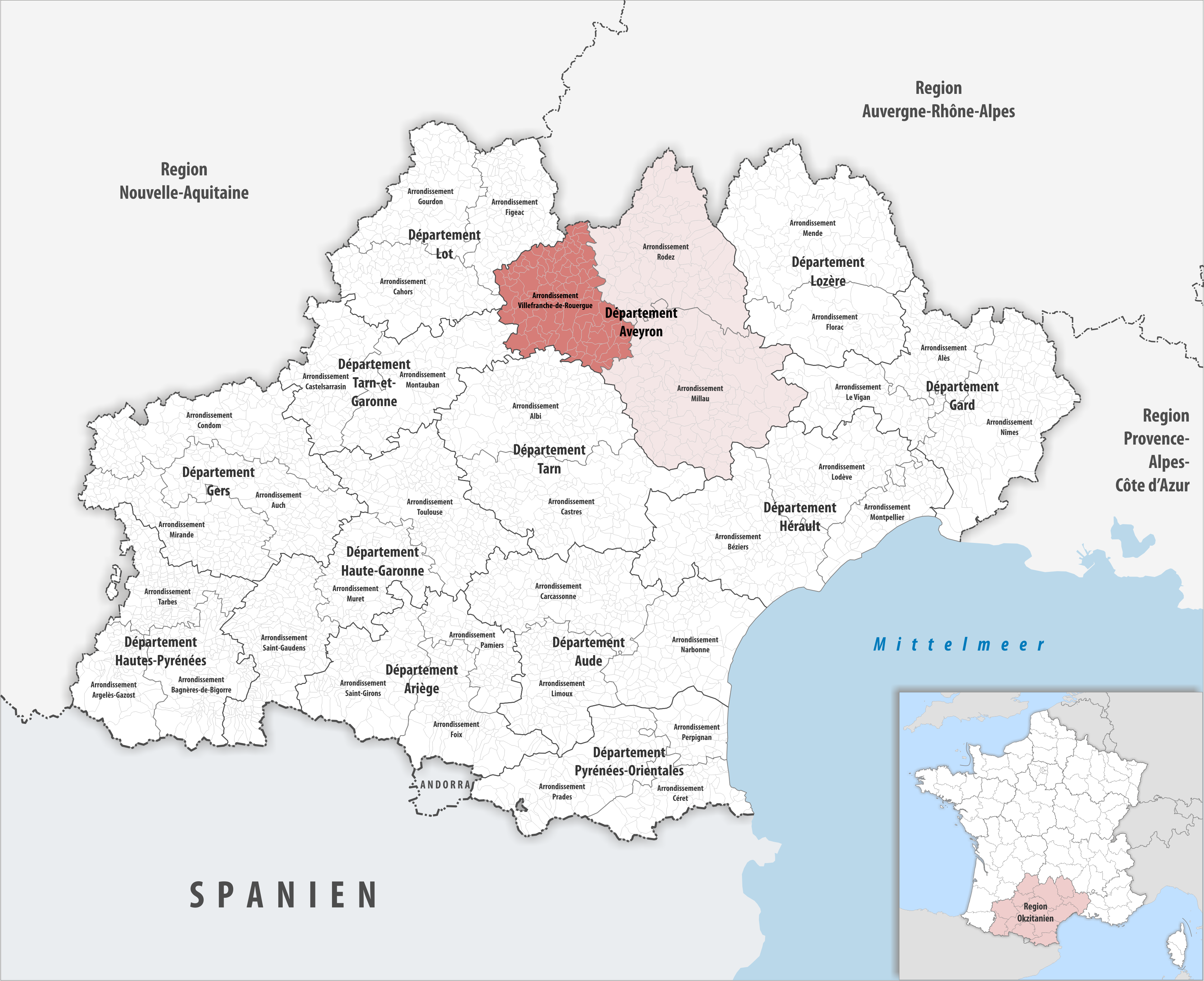
- Location within the region Occitanie
- Country: France
- Region: Occitania
- Department: Aveyron
- No. of communes: {{{nbcomm}}}
- Area: 2,123.7 km^{2} (820.0 sq mi)
- Population (2023): 87,290
  - Density: 41.10/km^{2} (106.5/sq mi)
- INSEE code: 123

The arrondissement of Villefranche-de-Rouergue is an arrondissement of France in the Aveyron department in the Occitanie region. It has 96 communes. Its population is 87,493 (2021), and its area is 2,123.7 km^{2} (820.0 sq mi).

== Composition ==
The communes of the arrondissement of Villefranche-de-Rouergue, and their INSEE codes, are:

1. Les Albres (12003)
2. Almont-les-Junies (12004)
3. Ambeyrac (12007)
4. Anglars-Saint-Félix (12008)
5. Asprières (12012)
6. Aubin (12013)
7. Auzits (12016)
8. Balaguier-d'Olt (12018)
9. Baraqueville (12056)
10. Le Bas-Ségala (12021)
11. Belcastel (12024)
12. Boisse-Penchot (12028)
13. Bor-et-Bar (12029)
14. Bouillac (12030)
15. Bournazel (12031)
16. Boussac (12032)
17. Brandonnet (12034)
18. Cabanès (12041)
19. Calmont (12043)
20. Camboulazet (12045)
21. Camjac (12046)
22. Capdenac-Gare (12052)
23. La Capelle-Balaguier (12053)
24. La Capelle-Bleys (12054)
25. Cassagnes-Bégonhès (12057)
26. Castanet (12059)
27. Castelmary (12060)
28. Causse-et-Diège (12257)
29. Centrès (12065)
30. Colombiès (12068)
31. Compolibat (12071)
32. Cransac (12083)
33. Crespin (12085)
34. Decazeville (12089)
35. Drulhe (12091)
36. Escandolières (12095)
37. Firmi (12100)
38. Flagnac (12101)
39. Foissac (12104)
40. La Fouillade (12105)
41. Galgan (12108)
42. Goutrens (12111)
43. Gramond (12113)
44. Lanuéjouls (12121)
45. Lescure-Jaoul (12128)
46. Livinhac-le-Haut (12130)
47. Lugan (12134)
48. Lunac (12135)
49. Maleville (12136)
50. Manhac (12137)
51. Martiel (12140)
52. Mayran (12142)
53. Meljac (12144)
54. Montbazens (12148)
55. Monteils (12150)
56. Montsalès (12158)
57. Morlhon-le-Haut (12159)
58. Moyrazès (12162)
59. Najac (12167)
60. Naucelle (12169)
61. Naussac (12170)
62. Ols-et-Rinhodes (12175)
63. Peyrusse-le-Roc (12181)
64. Pradinas (12189)
65. Prévinquières (12190)
66. Privezac (12191)
67. Quins (12194)
68. Rieupeyroux (12198)
69. Rignac (12199)
70. La Rouquette (12205)
71. Roussennac (12206)
72. Saint-André-de-Najac (12210)
73. Sainte-Croix (12217)
74. Sainte-Juliette-sur-Viaur (12234)
75. Saint-Igest (12227)
76. Saint-Just-sur-Viaur (12235)
77. Saint-Parthem (12240)
78. Saint-Rémy (12242)
79. Saint-Santin (12246)
80. Salles-Courbatiès (12252)
81. Salvagnac-Cajarc (12256)
82. La Salvetat-Peyralès (12258)
83. Sanvensa (12259)
84. Saujac (12261)
85. Sauveterre-de-Rouergue (12262)
86. Savignac (12263)
87. Sonnac (12272)
88. Tauriac-de-Naucelle (12276)
89. Tayrac (12278)
90. Toulonjac (12281)
91. Vailhourles (12287)
92. Valzergues (12289)
93. Vaureilles (12290)
94. Villefranche-de-Rouergue (12300)
95. Villeneuve (12301)
96. Viviez (12305)

== History ==
The arrondissement of Villefranche-de-Rouergue was created in 1800. At the January 2017 reorganization of the arrondissements of Aveyron, it gained 34 communes from the arrondissement of Rodez.

As a result of the reorganisation of the cantons of France which came into effect in 2015, the borders of the cantons are no longer related to the borders of the arrondissements. The cantons of the arrondissement of Villefranche-de-Rouergue were, as of January 2015:

1. Aubin
2. Capdenac-Gare
3. Decazeville
4. Montbazens
5. Najac
6. Rieupeyroux
7. Villefranche-de-Rouergue
8. Villeneuve
