= Saint-Igest =

Commune in Occitanie, France

- Commune
- Coat of arms
- Location of Saint-Igest
- Location within France Location within Occitanie
- Coordinates: 44°26′23″N 2°05′11″E
- Country: France
- Region: Occitania
- Department: Aveyron
- Arrondissement: Villefranche-de-Rouergue
- Canton: Villeneuvois et Villefranchois

Government
  - Mayor (2020–2026): Daniel Teulier
- Area^{1}: 11.72 km^{2} (4.53 sq mi)
- Elevation: 400 m (1,300 ft)
- Highest elevation: 504 m (1,654 ft)
- Lowest elevation: 280 m (920 ft)
- Population (2023): 188
  - Density: 16.0/km^{2} (41.5/sq mi)
- Time zone: UTC+01:00 (CET)
  - Summer (DST): UTC+02:00 (CEST)
- INSEE/Postal code: 12227 /12260
- ^{1} French Land Register data, which excludes lakes, ponds, glaciers > 1 km^{2} (0.386 sq mi or 247 acres) and river estuaries.

Saint-Igest (French pronunciation: [sɛ̃.t‿iʒɛst]; Occitan: Sanch Igèst) is a commune in the Aveyron department in southern France.

== Population ==
Historical population
Year	Pop.	±% p.a.
1968	285	—
1975	241	−2.37%
1982	201	−2.56%
1990	158	−2.96%
1999	163	+0.35%
2007	172	+0.67%
2012	191	+2.12%
2017	191	+0.00%
2023	188	−0.26%
Source: INSEE

== See also ==
- Communes of the Aveyron department
