= La Rouquette =

Commune in Occitanie, France

- Commune
- Location of La Rouquette
- Location within France Location within Occitanie
- Coordinates: 44°18′11″N 1°58′31″E
- Country: France
- Region: Occitania
- Department: Aveyron
- Arrondissement: Villefranche-de-Rouergue
- Canton: Villefranche-de-Rouergue

Government
  - Mayor (2020–2026): Thierry Serin
- Area^{1}: 29.81 km^{2} (11.51 sq mi)
- Elevation: 225 m (738 ft)
- Highest elevation: 429 m (1,407 ft)
- Lowest elevation: 230 m (750 ft)
- Population (2023): 777
  - Density: 26.1/km^{2} (67.5/sq mi)
- Time zone: UTC+01:00 (CET)
  - Summer (DST): UTC+02:00 (CEST)
- INSEE/Postal code: 12205 /12200
- ^{1} French Land Register data, which excludes lakes, ponds, glaciers > 1 km^{2} (0.386 sq mi or 247 acres) and river estuaries.

La Rouquette (French pronunciation: [la ʁukɛt]; Occitan: La Roqueta) is a commune in the Aveyron department in southern France.

== Population ==
Historical population
Year	Pop.	±% p.a.
1968	415	—
1975	434	+0.64%
1982	554	+3.55%
1990	586	+0.70%
1999	626	+0.74%
2007	710	+1.59%
2012	760	+1.37%
2017	784	+0.62%
2023	777	−0.15%
Source: INSEE

== See also ==
- Communes of the Aveyron department
