= Galgan =

Commune in Occitanie, France

- Commune
- Coat of arms
- Location of Galgan
- Location within France Location within Occitanie
- Coordinates: 44°30′12″N 2°10′46″E
- Country: France
- Region: Occitania
- Department: Aveyron
- Arrondissement: Villefranche-de-Rouergue
- Canton: Lot et Montbazinois
- Intercommunality: Plateau de Montbazens

Government
  - Mayor (2020–2026): Jean Alaux
- Area^{1}: 20.37 km^{2} (7.86 sq mi)
- Elevation: 471 m (1,545 ft)
- Highest elevation: 492 m (1,614 ft)
- Lowest elevation: 240 m (790 ft)
- Population (2023): 363
  - Density: 17.8/km^{2} (46.2/sq mi)
- Time zone: UTC+01:00 (CET)
  - Summer (DST): UTC+02:00 (CEST)
- INSEE/Postal code: 12108 /12220
- ^{1} French Land Register data, which excludes lakes, ponds, glaciers > 1 km^{2} (0.386 sq mi or 247 acres) and river estuaries.

Galgan (French pronunciation: [ɡalɡɑ̃]; Occitan: Galganh) is a commune in the Aveyron department in southern France.

== Population ==
Historical population
Year	Pop.	±% p.a.
1968	505	—
1975	454	−1.51%
1982	417	−1.21%
1990	357	−1.92%
1999	324	−1.07%
2007	350	+0.97%
2012	353	+0.17%
2017	373	+1.11%
2023	363	−0.45%
Source: INSEE

== See also ==
- Communes of the Aveyron department
