= Valzergues =

Commune in Occitanie, France

- Commune
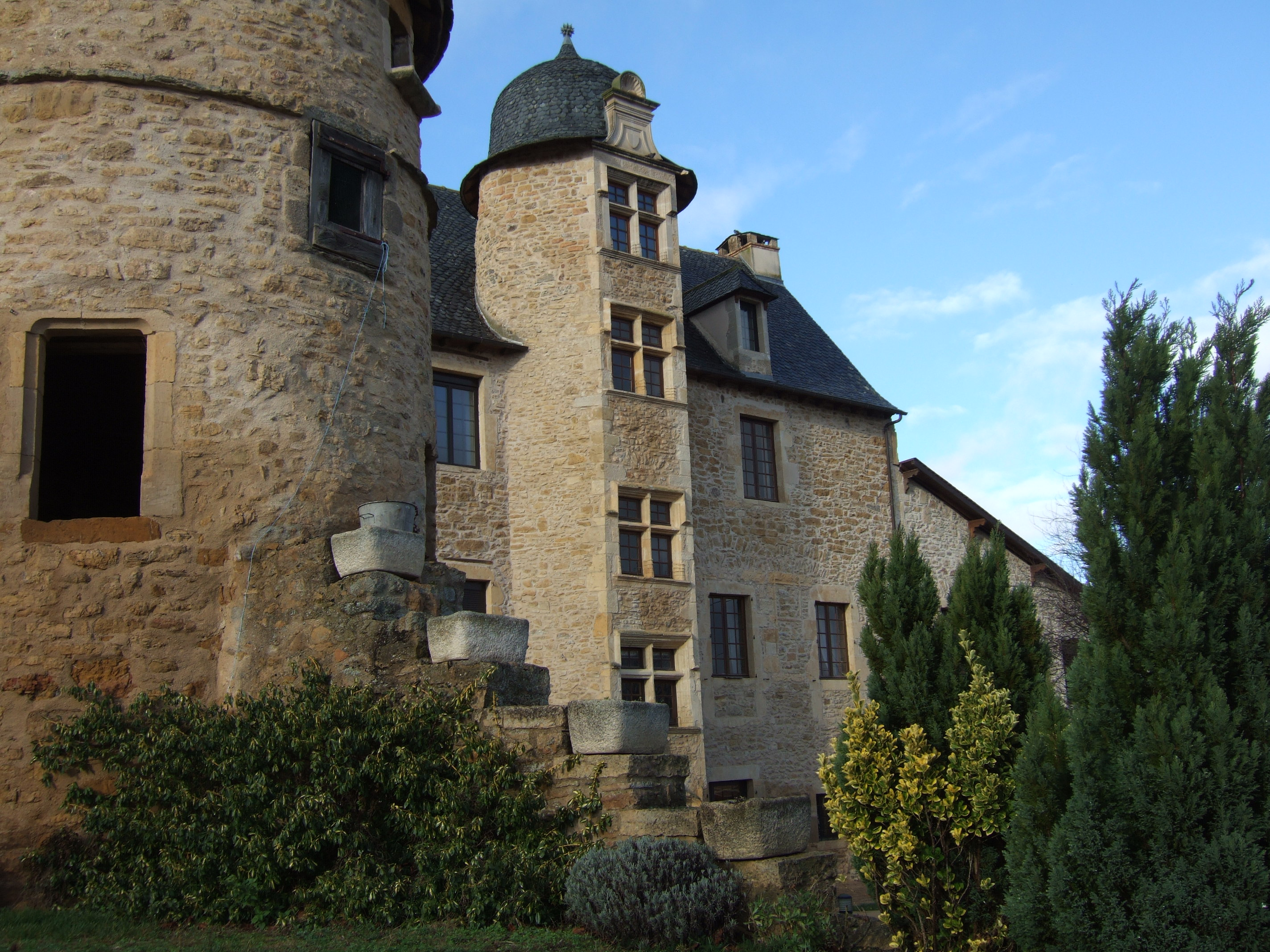
- Town hall
- Location of Valzergues
- Location within France Location within Occitanie
- Coordinates: 44°30′00″N 2°13′20″E
- Country: France
- Region: Occitania
- Department: Aveyron
- Arrondissement: Villefranche-de-Rouergue
- Canton: Lot et Montbazinois
- Intercommunality: Plateau de Montbazens

Government
  - Mayor (2020–2026): Didier Foissac
- Area^{1}: 6.49 km^{2} (2.51 sq mi)
- Elevation: 450 m (1,480 ft)
- Highest elevation: 468 m (1,535 ft)
- Lowest elevation: 261 m (856 ft)
- Population (2023): 207
  - Density: 31.9/km^{2} (82.6/sq mi)
- Time zone: UTC+01:00 (CET)
  - Summer (DST): UTC+02:00 (CEST)
- INSEE/Postal code: 12289 /12220
- ^{1} French Land Register data, which excludes lakes, ponds, glaciers > 1 km^{2} (0.386 sq mi or 247 acres) and river estuaries.

Valzergues (French pronunciation: [valzɛʁg]; Occitan: Valzèrgas) is a commune in the Aveyron department in southern France.

== Population ==
Historical population
| Year | Pop. | ±% p.a. |
|---|---|---|
| 1968 | 262 | — |
| 1975 | 223 | −2.28% |
| 1982 | 225 | +0.13% |
| 1990 | 216 | −0.51% |
| 1999 | 203 | −0.69% |
| 2007 | 210 | +0.42% |
| 2012 | 201 | −0.87% |
| 2017 | 214 | +1.26% |
| 2023 | 207 | −0.55% |
Source: INSEE

== See also ==
- Communes of the Aveyron department
