= Compolibat =

Commune in Occitanie, France

- Commune
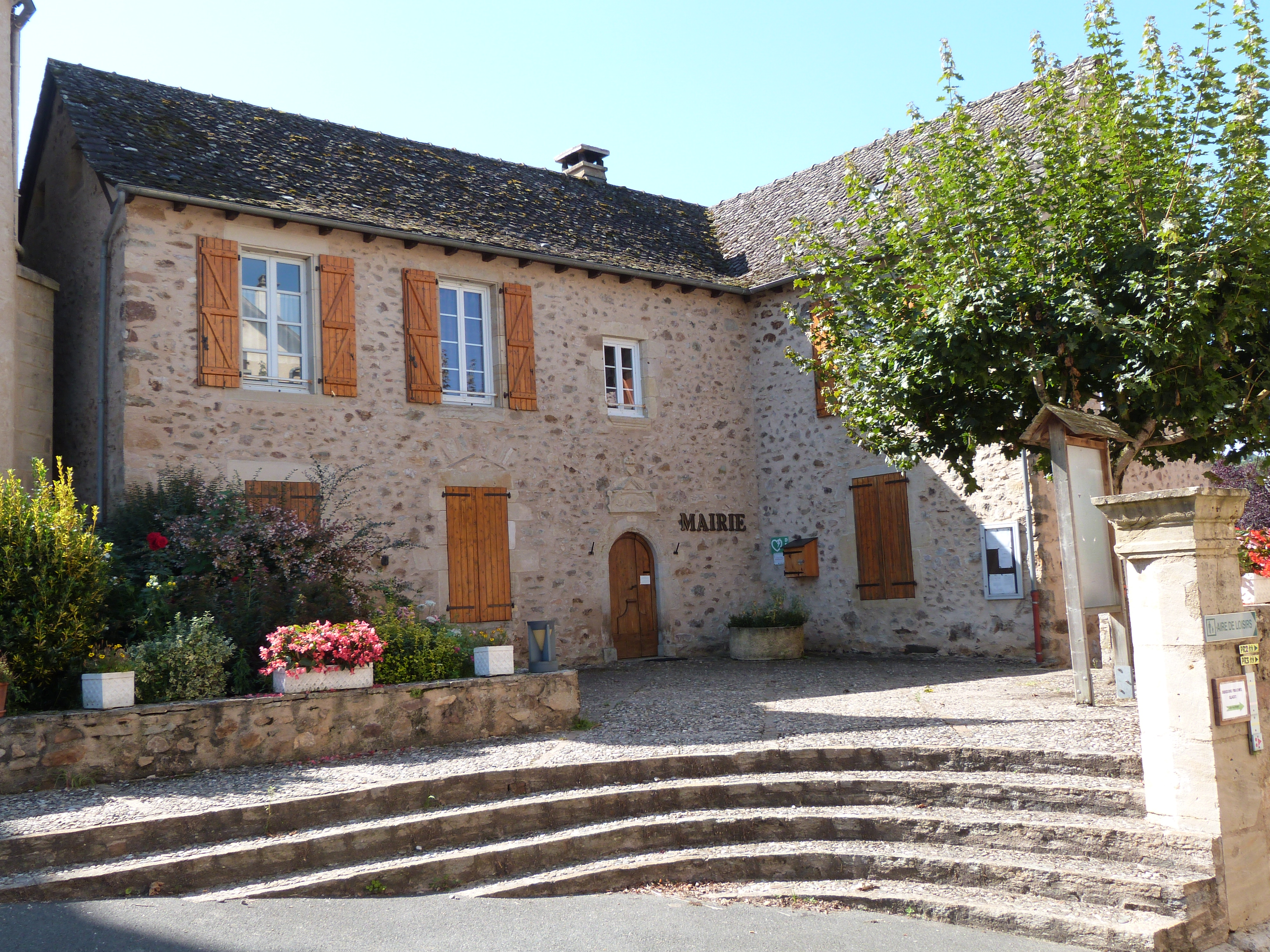
- The town hall in Compolibat
- Location of Compolibat
- Location within France Location within Occitanie
- Coordinates: 44°22′43″N 2°11′45″E
- Country: France
- Region: Occitania
- Department: Aveyron
- Arrondissement: Villefranche-de-Rouergue
- Canton: Villeneuvois et Villefranchois
- Intercommunality: Plateau de Montbazens

Government
  - Mayor (2020–2026): Francis Deleris
- Area^{1}: 17.04 km^{2} (6.58 sq mi)
- Elevation: 530 m (1,740 ft)
- Highest elevation: 664 m (2,178 ft)
- Lowest elevation: 350 m (1,150 ft)
- Population (2023): 335
  - Density: 19.7/km^{2} (50.9/sq mi)
- Time zone: UTC+01:00 (CET)
  - Summer (DST): UTC+02:00 (CEST)
- INSEE/Postal code: 12071 /12350
- ^{1} French Land Register data, which excludes lakes, ponds, glaciers > 1 km^{2} (0.386 sq mi or 247 acres) and river estuaries.

Compolibat (French pronunciation: [kɔ̃pɔliba]; Occitan: Complibat) is a commune in the Aveyron department in southern France.

== Population ==
Historical population
Year	Pop.	±% p.a.
1968	556	—
1975	508	−1.28%
1982	472	−1.04%
1990	469	−0.08%
1999	405	−1.62%
2007	409	+0.12%
2012	383	−1.31%
2017	347	−1.95%
2023	335	−0.58%
Source: INSEE

== See also ==
- Communes of the Aveyron department
