= Communes of the Aveyron department =

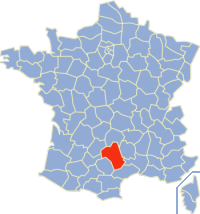

The following is a list of the 285 communes of the Aveyron department of France. Out of the land area is being 8,735 square kilometres (3,373 sq mi), and the percentage of the department's land area is just 34 per cent of its land area of an average commune.

The communes cooperate in the following intercommunalities (as of 2025):

- Communauté d'agglomération Rodez Agglomération
- Communauté de communes Aubrac, Carladez et Viadène
- Communauté de communes Aveyron Bas Ségala Viaur
- Communauté de communes des Causses à l'Aubrac
- Communauté de communes Comtal Lot et Truyère
- Communauté de communes Conques-Marcillac
- Communauté de communes Decazeville Communauté
- Communauté de communes Grand-Figeac (partly)
- Communauté de communes Larzac et Vallées
- Communauté de communes de Lévézou Pareloup
- Communauté de communes de Millau Grands Causses (partly)
- Communauté de communes Monts, Rance et Rougier
- Communauté de communes de la Muse et des Raspes du Tarn
- Communauté de communes Ouest Aveyron Communauté (partly)
- Communauté de communes du Pays Rignacois
- Communauté de communes du Pays de Salars
- Communauté de communes Pays Ségali
- Communauté de communes du Plateau de Montbazens
- Communauté de communes du Réquistanais
- Communauté de communes Saint Affricain, Roquefort, Sept Vallons

INSEE	Postal	Commune
12001	12630	Agen-d'Aveyron
12002	12520	Aguessac
12003	12220	Les Albres
12004	12300	Almont-les-Junies
12006	12430	Alrance
12007	12260	Ambeyrac
12008	12390	Anglars-Saint-Félix
12223	12420	Argences-en-Aubrac
12009	12360	Arnac-sur-Dourdou
12010	12290	Arques
12011	12120	Arvieu
12012	12700	Asprières
12013	12110	Aubin
12015	12120	Auriac-Lagast
12016	12390	Auzits
12017	12430	Ayssènes
12018	12260	Balaguier-d'Olt
12019	12380	Balaguier-sur-Rance
12056	12160	Baraqueville
12021	12200	Le Bas-Ségala
12022	12490	La Bastide-Pradines
12023	12550	La Bastide-Solages
12024	12390	Belcastel
12025	12370	Belmont-sur-Rance
12026	12310	Bertholène
12027	12500	Bessuéjouls
12028	12300	Boisse-Penchot
12029	12270	Bor-et-Bar
12030	12300	Bouillac
12031	12390	Bournazel
12032	12160	Boussac
12033	12340	Bozouls
12034	12350	Brandonnet
12035	12550	Brasc
12036	12600	Brommat
12037	12480	Broquiès
12038	12480	Brousse-le-Château
12039	12360	Brusque
12041	12800	Cabanès
12042	12400	Calmels-et-le-Viala
12043	12450	Calmont
12044	12360	Camarès
12045	12160	Camboulazet
12046	12800	Camjac
12047	12560	Campagnac
12048	12140	Campouriez
12049	12580	Campuac
12050	12290	Canet-de-Salars
12051	12420	Cantoin
12052	12700	Capdenac-Gare
12053	12260	La Capelle-Balaguier
12054	12240	La Capelle-Bleys
12055	12130	La Capelle-Bonance
12057	12120	Cassagnes-Bégonhès
12058	12210	Cassuéjouls
12059	12240	Castanet
12060	12800	Castelmary
12061	12500	Castelnau-de-Mandailles
12062	12620	Castelnau-Pégayrols
12257	12700	Causse-et-Diège
12063	12230	La Cavalerie
12064	12500	Le Cayrol
12065	12120	Centrès
12066	12330	Clairvaux-d'Aveyron
12067	12540	Le Clapier
12068	12240	Colombiès
12069	12370	Combret
12070	12520	Compeyre
12071	12350	Compolibat
12072	12100	Comprégnac
12073	12120	Comps-la-Grand-Ville
12074	12470	Condom-d'Aubrac
12075	12170	Connac
12076	12320	Conques-en-Rouergue
12077	12540	Cornus
12078	12400	Les Costes-Gozon
12079	12190	Coubisou
12080	12550	Coupiac
12082	12230	La Couvertoirade
12083	12110	Cransac
12084	12100	Creissels
12085	12800	Crespin
12086	12640	La Cresse
12307	12410	Curan
12088	12210	Curières
12089	12300	Decazeville
12090	12510	Druelle Balsac
12091	12350	Drulhe
12092	12170	Durenque
12094	12140	Entraygues-sur-Truyère
12095	12390	Escandolières
12096	12500	Espalion
12097	12140	Espeyrac
12098	12190	Estaing
12099	12360	Fayet
12093	12140	Le Fel
12100	12300	Firmi
12101	12300	Flagnac
12102	12450	Flavin
12103	12140	Florentin-la-Capelle
12104	12260	Foissac
12155	12540	Fondamente
12105	12270	La Fouillade
12106	12340	Gabriac
12107	12310	Gaillac-d'Aveyron
12108	12220	Galgan
12109	12360	Gissac
12110	12140	Golinhac
12111	12390	Goutrens
12113	12160	Gramond
12115	12230	L'Hospitalet-du-Larzac
12116	12460	Huparlac
12118	12600	Lacroix-Barrez
12119	12210	Laguiole
12120	12310	Laissac-Sévérac-l'Église
12121	12350	Lanuéjouls
12122	12230	Lapanouse-de-Cernon
12124	12500	Lassouts
12125	12380	Laval-Roquecezière
12127	12170	Lédergues
12128	12440	Lescure-Jaoul
12129	12430	Lestrade-et-Thouels
12130	12300	Livinhac-le-Haut
12131	12740	La Loubière
12133	12450	Luc-la-Primaube
12134	12220	Lugan
12135	12270	Lunac
12136	12350	Maleville
12137	12160	Manhac
12138	12330	Marcillac-Vallon
12139	12540	Marnhagues-et-Latour
12140	12200	Martiel
12141	12550	Martrin
12142	12390	Mayran
12143	12360	Mélagues
12144	12120	Meljac
12145	12100	Millau
12146	12000	Le Monastère
12147	12360	Montagnol
12148	12220	Montbazens
12149	12550	Montclar
12150	12200	Monteils

INSEE	Postal	Commune
12151	12460	Montézic
12152	12380	Montfranc
12153	12490	Montjaux
12154	12400	Montlaur
12156	12210	Montpeyroux
12157	12630	Montrozier
12158	12260	Montsalès
12159	12200	Morlhon-le-Haut
12160	12720	Mostuéjouls
12192	12370	Mounes-Prohencoux
12161	12330	Mouret
12162	12160	Moyrazès
12163	12370	Murasson
12164	12600	Mur-de-Barrez
12165	12330	Muret-le-Château
12166	12600	Murols
12167	12270	Najac
12168	12230	Nant
12169	12800	Naucelle
12170	12700	Naussac
12171	12330	Nauviale
12172	12190	Le Nayrac
12174	12510	Olemps
12175	12260	Ols-et-Rinhodes
12176	12850	Onet-le-Château
12177	12310	Palmas-d'Aveyron
12178	12520	Paulhe
12179	12360	Peux-et-Couffouleux
12180	12720	Peyreleau
12181	12220	Peyrusse-le-Roc
12182	12130	Pierrefiche
12183	12550	Plaisance
12184	12130	Pomayrols
12185	12290	Pont-de-Salars
12186	12380	Pousthomy
12187	12470	Prades-d'Aubrac
12188	12290	Prades-Salars
12189	12240	Pradinas
12190	12350	Prévinquières
12191	12350	Privezac
12193	12320	Pruines
12194	12800	Quins
12195	12400	Rebourguil
12197	12170	Réquista
12198	12240	Rieupeyroux
12199	12390	Rignac
12200	12640	Rivière-sur-Tarn
12201	12340	Rodelle
12202	12000	Rodez
12203	12250	Roquefort-sur-Soulzon
12204	12100	La Roque-Sainte-Marguerite
12205	12200	La Rouquette
12206	12220	Roussennac
12207	12120	Rullac-Saint-Cirq
12208	12400	Saint-Affrique
12209	12460	Saint-Amans-des-Cots
12210	12270	Saint-André-de-Najac
12211	12720	Saint-André-de-Vézines
12212	12540	Saint-Beaulize
12213	12620	Saint-Beauzély
12214	12470	Saint-Chély-d'Aubrac
12215	12330	Saint-Christophe-Vallon
12216	12500	Saint-Côme-d'Olt
12217	12260	Sainte-Croix
12220	12230	Sainte-Eulalie-de-Cernon
12219	12130	Sainte-Eulalie-d'Olt
12234	12120	Sainte-Juliette-sur-Viaur
12241	12850	Sainte-Radegonde
12221	12320	Saint-Félix-de-Lunel
12222	12400	Saint-Félix-de-Sorgues
12224	12130	Saint-Geniez-d'Olt-et-d'Aubrac
12225	12100	Saint-Georges-de-Luzençon
12226	12140	Saint-Hippolyte
12227	12260	Saint-Igest
12228	12480	Saint-Izaire
12229	12250	Saint-Jean-d'Alcapiès
12230	12170	Saint-Jean-Delnous
12231	12230	Saint-Jean-du-Bruel
12232	12250	Saint-Jean-et-Saint-Paul
12233	12550	Saint-Juéry
12235	12800	Saint-Just-sur-Viaur
12236	12620	Saint-Laurent-de-Lévézou
12237	12560	Saint-Laurent-d'Olt
12238	12780	Saint-Léons
12239	12130	Saint-Martin-de-Lenne
12240	12300	Saint-Parthem
12242	12200	Saint-Rémy
12243	12490	Saint-Rome-de-Cernon
12244	12490	Saint-Rome-de-Tarn
12246	12300	Saint-Santin
12247	12560	Saint-Saturnin-de-Lenne
12248	12380	Saint-Sernin-sur-Rance
12249	12370	Saint-Sever-du-Moustier
12250	12460	Saint-Symphorien-de-Thénières
12251	12400	Saint-Victor-et-Melvieu
12252	12260	Salles-Courbatiès
12253	12410	Salles-Curan
12254	12330	Salles-la-Source
12255	12120	Salmiech
12256	12260	Salvagnac-Cajarc
12258	12440	La Salvetat-Peyralès
12259	12200	Sanvensa
12260	12230	Sauclières
12261	12260	Saujac
12262	12800	Sauveterre-de-Rouergue
12263	12200	Savignac
12264	12740	Sébazac-Concourès
12265	12190	Sébrazac
12266	12290	Ségur
12267	12170	La Selve
12268	12320	Sénergues
12269	12380	La Serre
12270	12150	Sévérac-d'Aveyron
12272	12700	Sonnac
12273	12210	Soulages-Bonneval
12274	12360	Sylvanès
12275	12360	Tauriac-de-Camarès
12276	12800	Tauriac-de-Naucelle
12277	12600	Taussac
12278	12440	Tayrac
12280	12600	Thérondels
12281	12200	Toulonjac
12282	12250	Tournemire
12283	12290	Trémouilles
12284	12430	Le Truel
12286	12400	Vabres-l'Abbaye
12287	12200	Vailhourles
12288	12330	Valady
12289	12220	Valzergues
12290	12220	Vaureilles
12291	12520	Verrières
12292	12400	Versols-et-Lapeyre
12293	12720	Veyreau
12294	12780	Vézins-de-Lévézou
12295	12250	Viala-du-Pas-de-Jaux
12296	12490	Viala-du-Tarn
12297	12290	Le Vibal
12298	12580	Villecomtal
12299	12430	Villefranche-de-Panat
12300	12200	Villefranche-de-Rouergue
12301	12260	Villeneuve
12303	12310	Vimenet
12305	12110	Viviez
