= Saint-Rémy, Aveyron =

Commune in Occitanie, France

Saint-Rémy
- Commune
- Location of Saint-Rémy
- Location within France Location within Occitanie
- Coordinates: 44°23′58″N 2°02′23″E
- Country: France
- Region: Occitania
- Department: Aveyron
- Arrondissement: Villefranche-de-Rouergue
- Canton: Villeneuvois et Villefranchois

Government
  - Mayor (2021–2026): Catherine Moya
- Area^{1}: 8.98 km^{2} (3.47 sq mi)
- Elevation: 300 m (980 ft)
- Highest elevation: 486 m (1,594 ft)
- Lowest elevation: 290 m (950 ft)
- Population (2023): 310
  - Density: 35/km^{2} (89/sq mi)
- Time zone: UTC+01:00 (CET)
  - Summer (DST): UTC+02:00 (CEST)
- INSEE/Postal code: 12242 /12200
- ^{1} French Land Register data, which excludes lakes, ponds, glaciers > 1 km^{2} (0.386 sq mi or 247 acres) and river estuaries.

Saint-Rémy (French pronunciation: [sɛ̃ ʁemi]; Languedocien: Sent Remèsi) is a commune in the Aveyron department in southern France.

== Population ==
Historical population
Year	Pop.	±% p.a.
1968	176	—
1975	185	+0.71%
1982	243	+3.97%
1990	296	+2.50%
1999	297	+0.04%
2007	317	+0.82%
2012	329	+0.75%
2017	317	−0.74%
2023	310	−0.37%
Source: INSEE

== See also ==
- Communes of the Aveyron department
