= Ols-et-Rinhodes =

Commune in Occitanie, France

- Commune
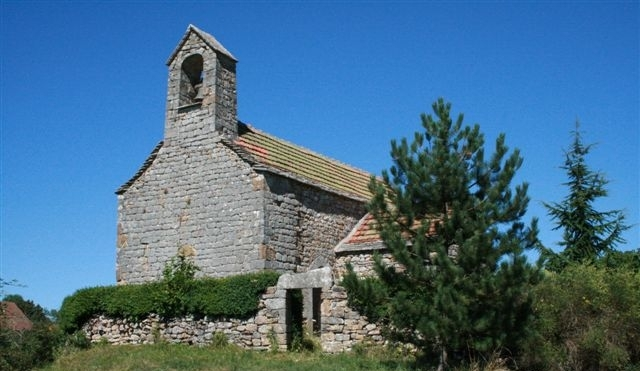
- The church in Rinhodes
- Location of Ols-et-Rinhodes
- Location within France Location within Occitanie
- Coordinates: 44°28′02″N 1°57′42″E
- Country: France
- Region: Occitania
- Department: Aveyron
- Arrondissement: Villefranche-de-Rouergue
- Canton: Villeneuvois et Villefranchois

Government
  - Mayor (2020–2026): Christian Saint-Affre
- Area^{1}: 10.82 km^{2} (4.18 sq mi)
- Elevation: 328 m (1,076 ft)
- Highest elevation: 400 m (1,300 ft)
- Lowest elevation: 305 m (1,001 ft)
- Population (2023): 158
  - Density: 14.6/km^{2} (37.8/sq mi)
- Time zone: UTC+01:00 (CET)
  - Summer (DST): UTC+02:00 (CEST)
- INSEE/Postal code: 12175 /12260
- ^{1} French Land Register data, which excludes lakes, ponds, glaciers > 1 km^{2} (0.386 sq mi or 247 acres) and river estuaries.

Ols-et-Rinhodes is a commune in the Aveyron department in southern France.

== Population ==
Historical population
Year	Pop.	±% p.a.
1968	115	—
1975	122	+0.85%
1982	128	+0.69%
1990	137	+0.85%
1999	120	−1.46%
2007	143	+2.22%
2012	154	+1.49%
2017	173	+2.35%
2023	158	−1.50%
Source: INSEE

== See also ==
- Communes of the Aveyron department
