= Villeneuve, Aveyron =

Commune in Occitanie, France

Villeneuve
- Commune
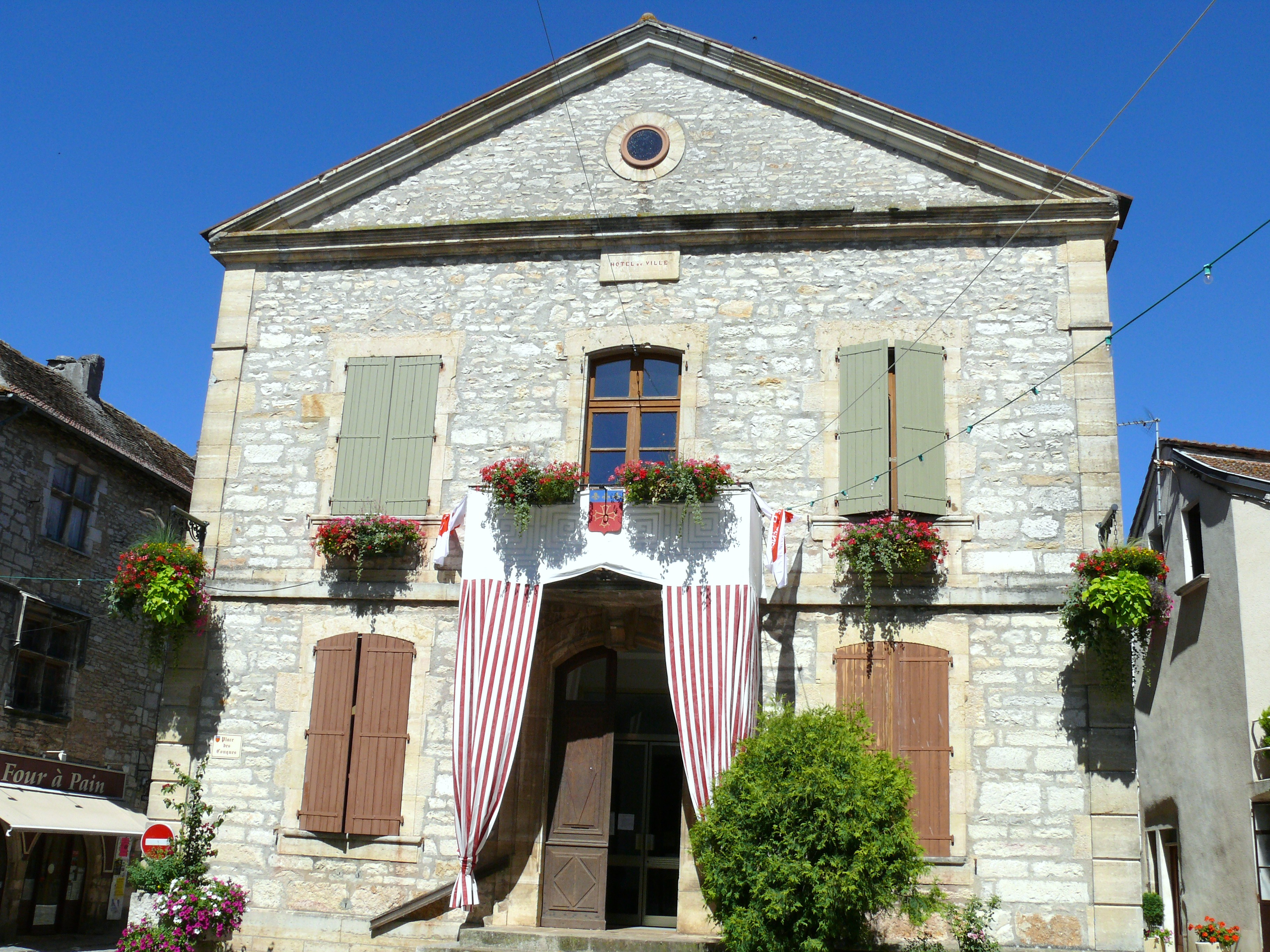
- Town hall

- Coat of arms
- Location of Villeneuve
- Location within France Location within Occitanie
- Coordinates: 44°26′17″N 2°01′57″E
- Country: France
- Region: Occitania
- Department: Aveyron
- Arrondissement: Villefranche-de-Rouergue
- Canton: Villeneuvois et Villefranchois

Government
  - Mayor (2020–2026): Jean-Pierre Masbou
- Area^{1}: 65.30 km^{2} (25.21 sq mi)
- Elevation: 411 m (1,348 ft)
- Highest elevation: 505 m (1,657 ft)
- Lowest elevation: 295 m (968 ft)
- Population (2023): 1,948
  - Density: 29.83/km^{2} (77.26/sq mi)
- Time zone: UTC+01:00 (CET)
  - Summer (DST): UTC+02:00 (CEST)
- INSEE/Postal code: 12301 /12260
- ^{1} French Land Register data, which excludes lakes, ponds, glaciers > 1 km^{2} (0.386 sq mi or 247 acres) and river estuaries.

Villeneuve (French pronunciation: [vilnœv]; Languedocien: Vilanòva) is a commune in the Aveyron département in southern France.

== Population ==
Historical population
Year	Pop.	±% p.a.
1968	1,461	—
1975	1,493	+0.31%
1982	1,649	+1.43%
1990	1,891	+1.73%
1999	2,017	+0.72%
2007	1,968	−0.31%
2012	1,947	−0.21%
2017	1,988	+0.42%
2023	1,948	−0.34%
Source: INSEE

== See also ==
- Communes of the Aveyron department
