= Vailhourles =

Commune in Occitanie, France

- Commune
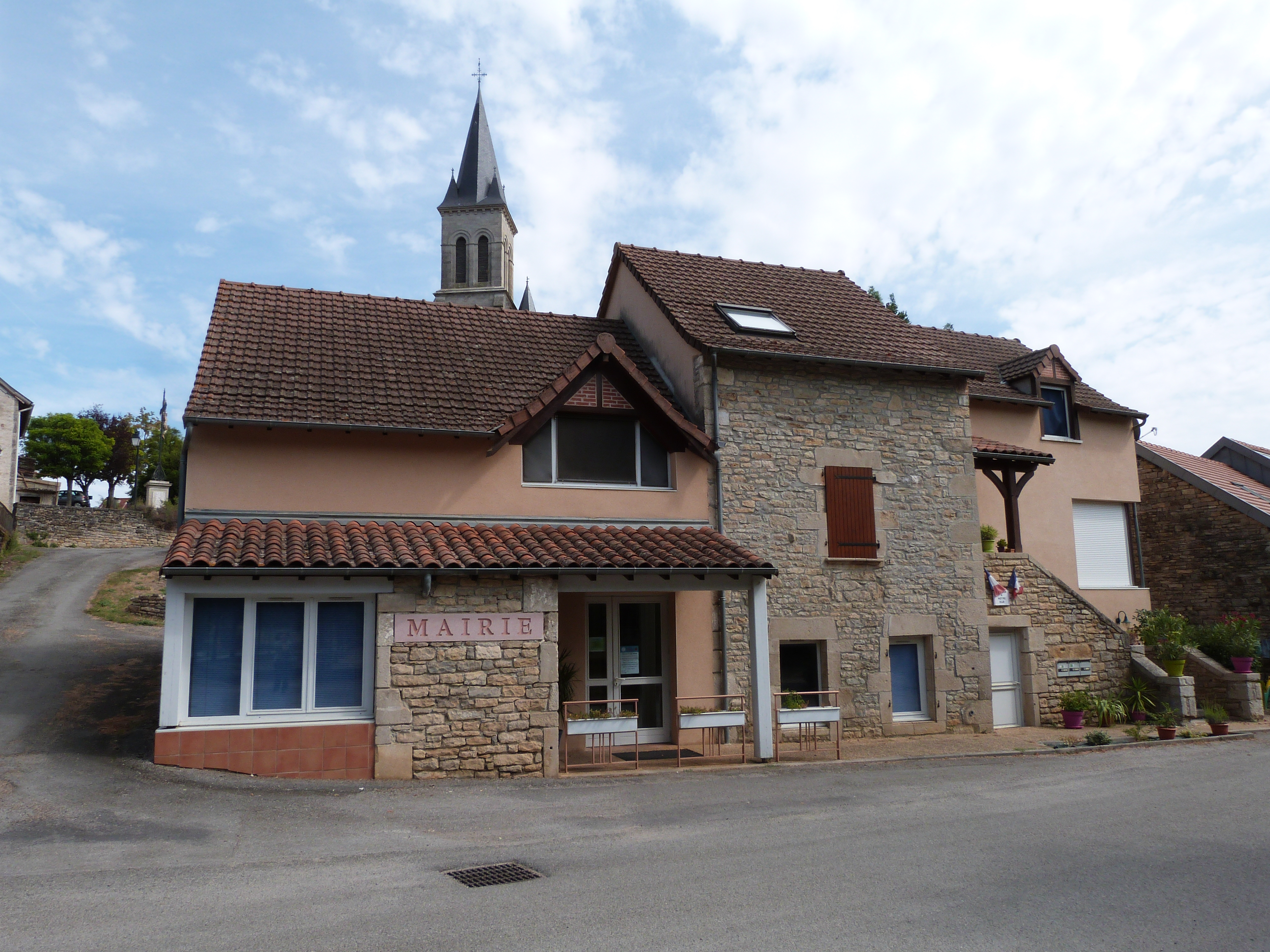
- Town hall
- Location of Vailhourles
- Location within France Location within Occitanie
- Coordinates: 44°18′22″N 1°54′26″E
- Country: France
- Region: Occitania
- Department: Aveyron
- Arrondissement: Villefranche-de-Rouergue
- Canton: Villefranche-de-Rouergue

Government
  - Mayor (2020–2026): Christian Chanut
- Area^{1}: 32.41 km^{2} (12.51 sq mi)
- Elevation: 370 m (1,210 ft)
- Highest elevation: 437 m (1,434 ft)
- Lowest elevation: 275 m (902 ft)
- Population (2023): 648
  - Density: 20.0/km^{2} (51.8/sq mi)
- Time zone: UTC+01:00 (CET)
  - Summer (DST): UTC+02:00 (CEST)
- INSEE/Postal code: 12287 /12200
- ^{1} French Land Register data, which excludes lakes, ponds, glaciers > 1 km^{2} (0.386 sq mi or 247 acres) and river estuaries.

Vailhourles (French pronunciation: [vajuʁl]; Occitan: Valhorlhas) is a commune in the Aveyron department in southern France.

== Population ==
Historical population
| Year | Pop. | ±% p.a. |
|---|---|---|
| 1968 | 615 | — |
| 1975 | 564 | −1.23% |
| 1982 | 556 | −0.20% |
| 1990 | 535 | −0.48% |
| 1999 | 511 | −0.51% |
| 2007 | 607 | +2.18% |
| 2012 | 696 | +2.77% |
| 2017 | 634 | −1.85% |
| 2023 | 648 | +0.36% |
Source: INSEE

== See also ==
- Communes of the Aveyron department
