= Canton of Villeneuvois et Villefranchois =

Coordinates: 44.44°N 2.03°E

- Canton
- Situation of the canton of Villeneuvois et Villefranchois in the department of Aveyron
- Country: France
- Region: Occitania
- Department: Aveyron
- No. of communes: {{{nbcomm}}}
- Population (2023): 10,845
- INSEE code: 1223

The canton of Villeneuvois et Villefranchois is an administrative division of the Aveyron department, southern France. It was created at the French canton reorganisation which came into effect in March 2015. Its seat is in Villeneuve.

It consists of the following communes:

1. Ambeyrac
2. Brandonnet
3. La Capelle-Balaguier
4. Compolibat
5. Drulhe
6. Lanuéjouls
7. Maleville
8. Martiel
9. Montsalès
10. Ols-et-Rinhodes
11. Privezac
12. Sainte-Croix
13. Saint-Igest
14. Saint-Rémy
15. Salvagnac-Cajarc
16. Saujac
17. Savignac
18. Toulonjac
19. Vaureilles
20. Villeneuve
