= Toulonjac =

Commune in Occitanie, France

- Commune
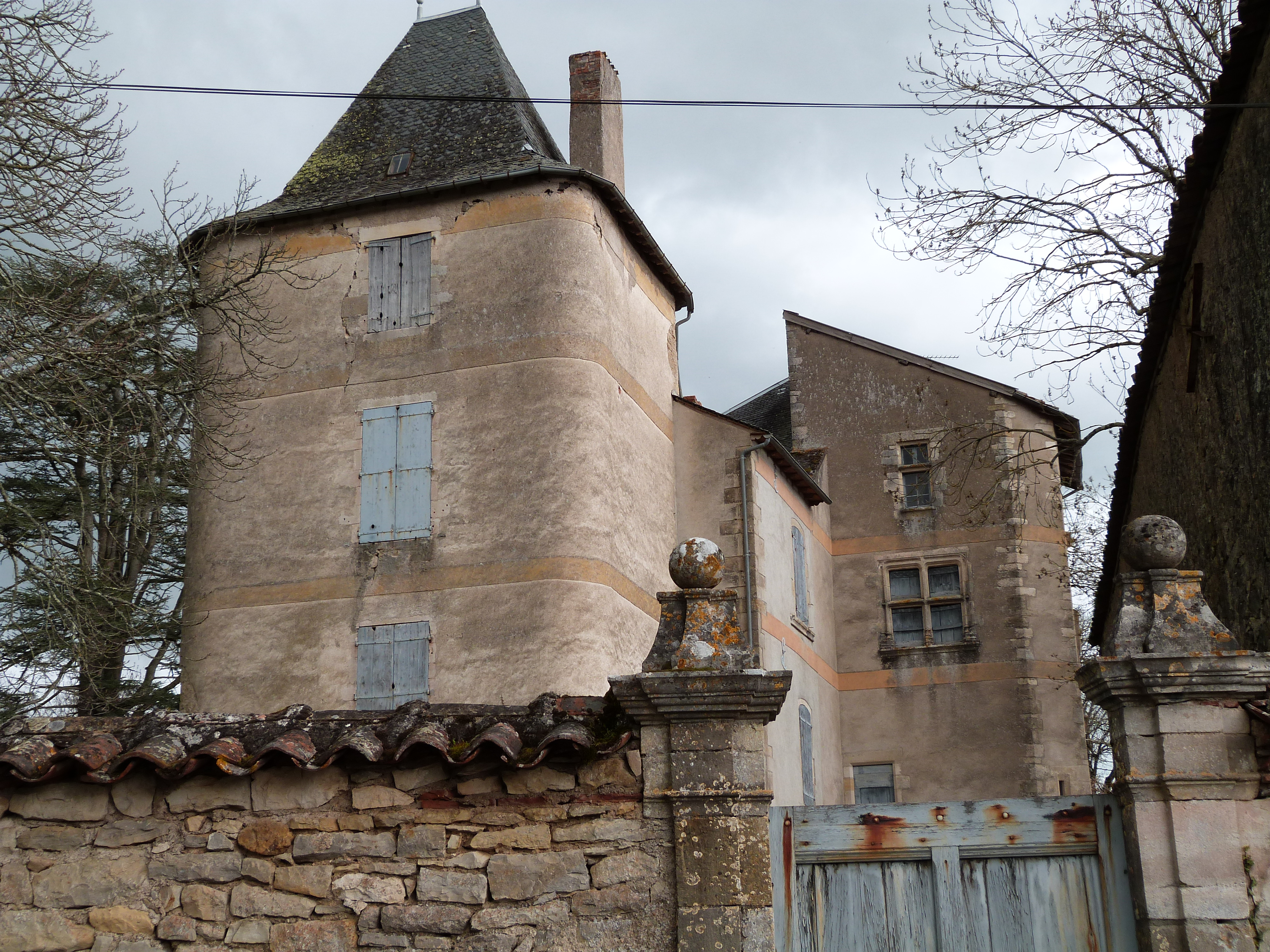
- The chateau in Toulonjac

- Coat of arms
- Location of Toulonjac
- Location within France Location within Occitanie
- Coordinates: 44°22′57″N 2°00′05″E
- Country: France
- Region: Occitania
- Department: Aveyron
- Arrondissement: Villefranche-de-Rouergue
- Canton: Villeneuvois et Villefranchois

Government
  - Mayor (2020–2026): Gilles Ruscassié
- Area^{1}: 7.25 km^{2} (2.80 sq mi)
- Elevation: 306 m (1,004 ft)
- Highest elevation: 441 m (1,447 ft)
- Lowest elevation: 288 m (945 ft)
- Population (2023): 755
  - Density: 104/km^{2} (270/sq mi)
- Time zone: UTC+01:00 (CET)
  - Summer (DST): UTC+02:00 (CEST)
- INSEE/Postal code: 12281 /12200
- ^{1} French Land Register data, which excludes lakes, ponds, glaciers > 1 km^{2} (0.386 sq mi or 247 acres) and river estuaries.

Toulonjac (French pronunciation: [tulɔ̃ʒak]; Occitan: Tolonjac) is a commune in the Aveyron department in southern France.

== Population ==
Historical population
Year	Pop.	±% p.a.
1968	328	—
1975	442	+4.35%
1982	531	+2.66%
1990	668	+2.91%
1999	642	−0.44%
2007	698	+1.05%
2012	724	+0.73%
2017	747	+0.63%
2023	755	+0.18%
Source: INSEE

== See also ==
- Communes of the Aveyron department
