= Martiel =

Commune in Occitanie, France

- Commune
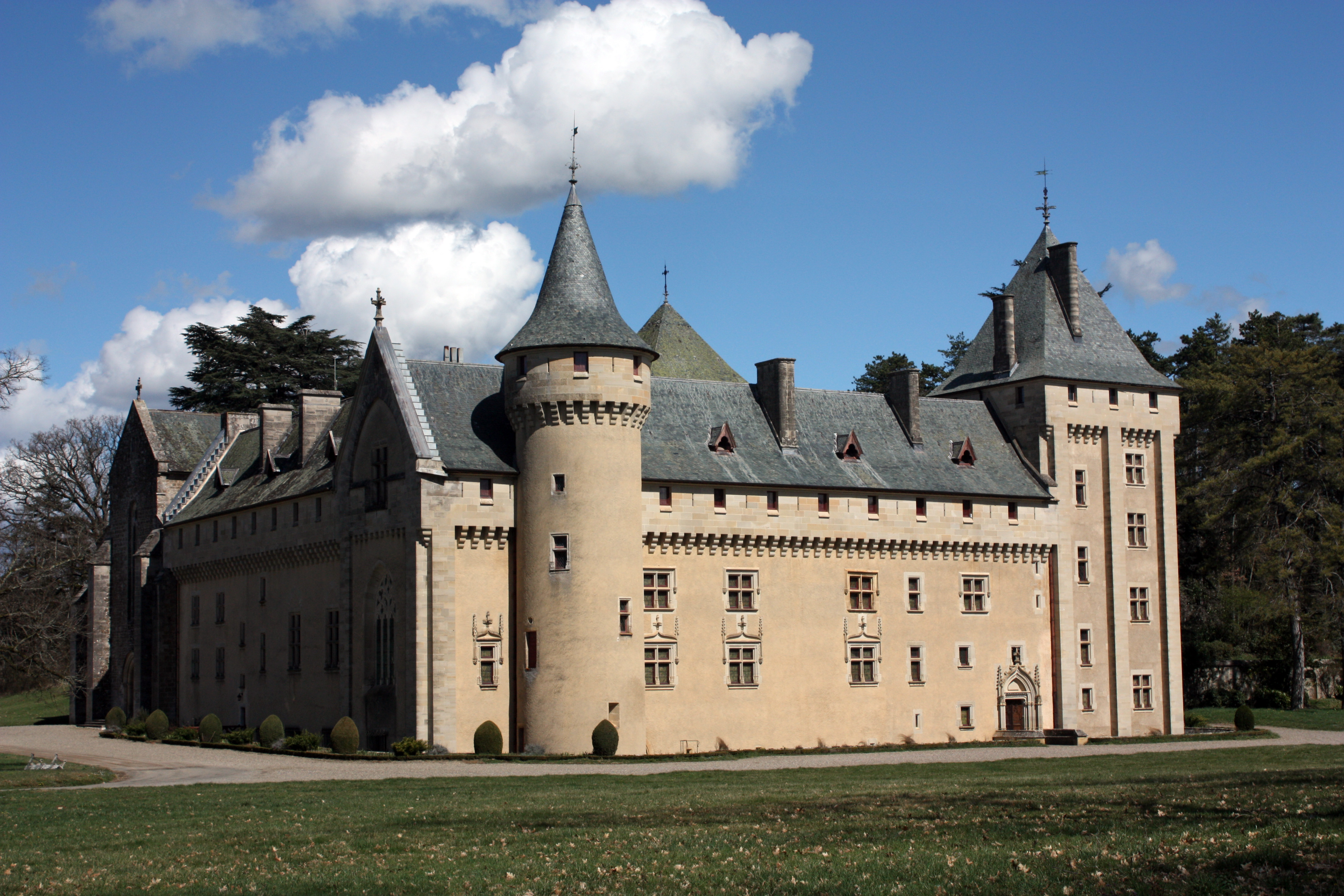
- Loc Dieu Abbey
- Location of Martiel
- Location within France Location within Occitanie
- Coordinates: 44°22′N 1°55′E
- Country: France
- Region: Occitania
- Department: Aveyron
- Arrondissement: Villefranche-de-Rouergue
- Canton: Villeneuvois et Villefranchois

Government
  - Mayor (2020–2026): Guy Marty
- Area^{1}: 46.9 km^{2} (18.1 sq mi)
- Elevation: 400 m (1,300 ft)
- Highest elevation: 430 m (1,410 ft)
- Lowest elevation: 254 m (833 ft)
- Population (2023): 1,008
  - Density: 21.5/km^{2} (55.7/sq mi)
- Time zone: UTC+01:00 (CET)
  - Summer (DST): UTC+02:00 (CEST)
- INSEE/Postal code: 12140 /12200
- ^{1} French Land Register data, which excludes lakes, ponds, glaciers > 1 km^{2} (0.386 sq mi or 247 acres) and river estuaries.

Martiel (French pronunciation: [maʁsjɛl]; Occitan: Marcièl) is a commune in the Aveyron department in southern France.

== Population ==
Historical population
Year	Pop.	±% p.a.
1968	677	—
1975	635	−0.91%
1982	706	+1.53%
1990	798	+1.54%
1999	823	+0.34%
2007	894	+1.04%
2012	972	+1.69%
2017	1,009	+0.75%
2023	1,008	−0.02%
Source: INSEE

== See also ==
- Communes of the Aveyron department

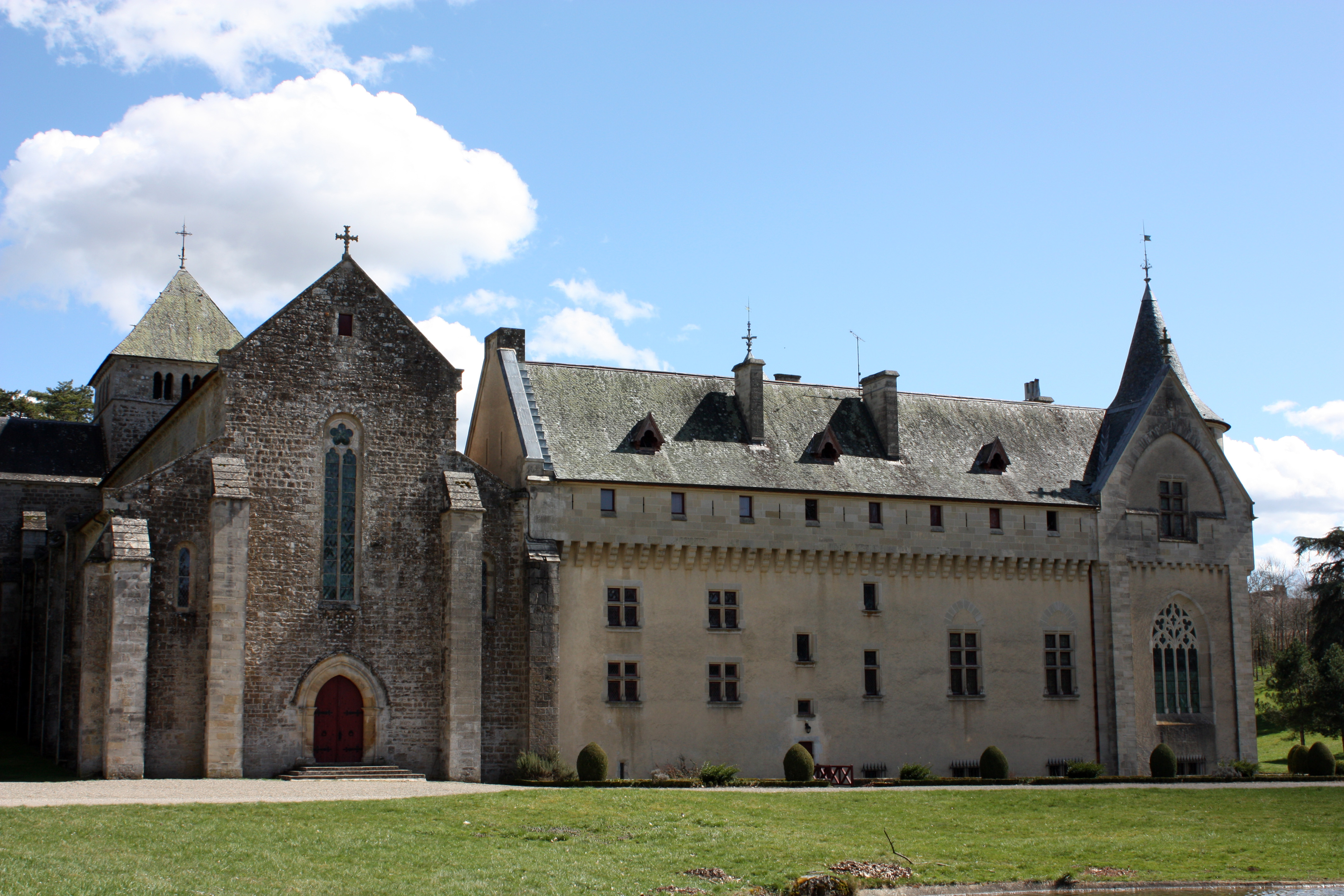
Loc Dieu Abbey
