= Escandolières =

Commune in Occitanie, France

- Commune
- Location of Escandolières
- Location within France Location within Occitanie
- Coordinates: 44°28′11″N 2°20′25″E
- Country: France
- Region: Occitania
- Department: Aveyron
- Arrondissement: Villefranche-de-Rouergue
- Canton: Enne et Alzou
- Intercommunality: Pays Rignacois

Government
  - Mayor (2020–2026): Christian Palayret
- Area^{1}: 13.5 km^{2} (5.2 sq mi)
- Elevation: 400 m (1,300 ft)
- Highest elevation: 638 m (2,093 ft)
- Lowest elevation: 294 m (965 ft)
- Population (2023): 212
  - Density: 15.7/km^{2} (40.7/sq mi)
- Time zone: UTC+01:00 (CET)
  - Summer (DST): UTC+02:00 (CEST)
- INSEE/Postal code: 12095 /12390
- ^{1} French Land Register data, which excludes lakes, ponds, glaciers > 1 km^{2} (0.386 sq mi or 247 acres) and river estuaries.

Escandolières (French pronunciation: [ɛskɑ̃dɔljɛʁ]; Occitan: Las Candolièiras) is a commune in the Aveyron department in southern France.

== Population ==
Historical population
Year	Pop.	±% p.a.
1968	324	—
1975	298	−1.19%
1982	272	−1.30%
1990	254	−0.85%
1999	224	−1.39%
2007	205	−1.10%
2012	219	+1.33%
2017	234	+1.33%
2023	212	−1.63%
Source: INSEE

== See also ==
- Communes of the Aveyron department
