= Montsalès =

Commune in Occitanie, France

- Commune
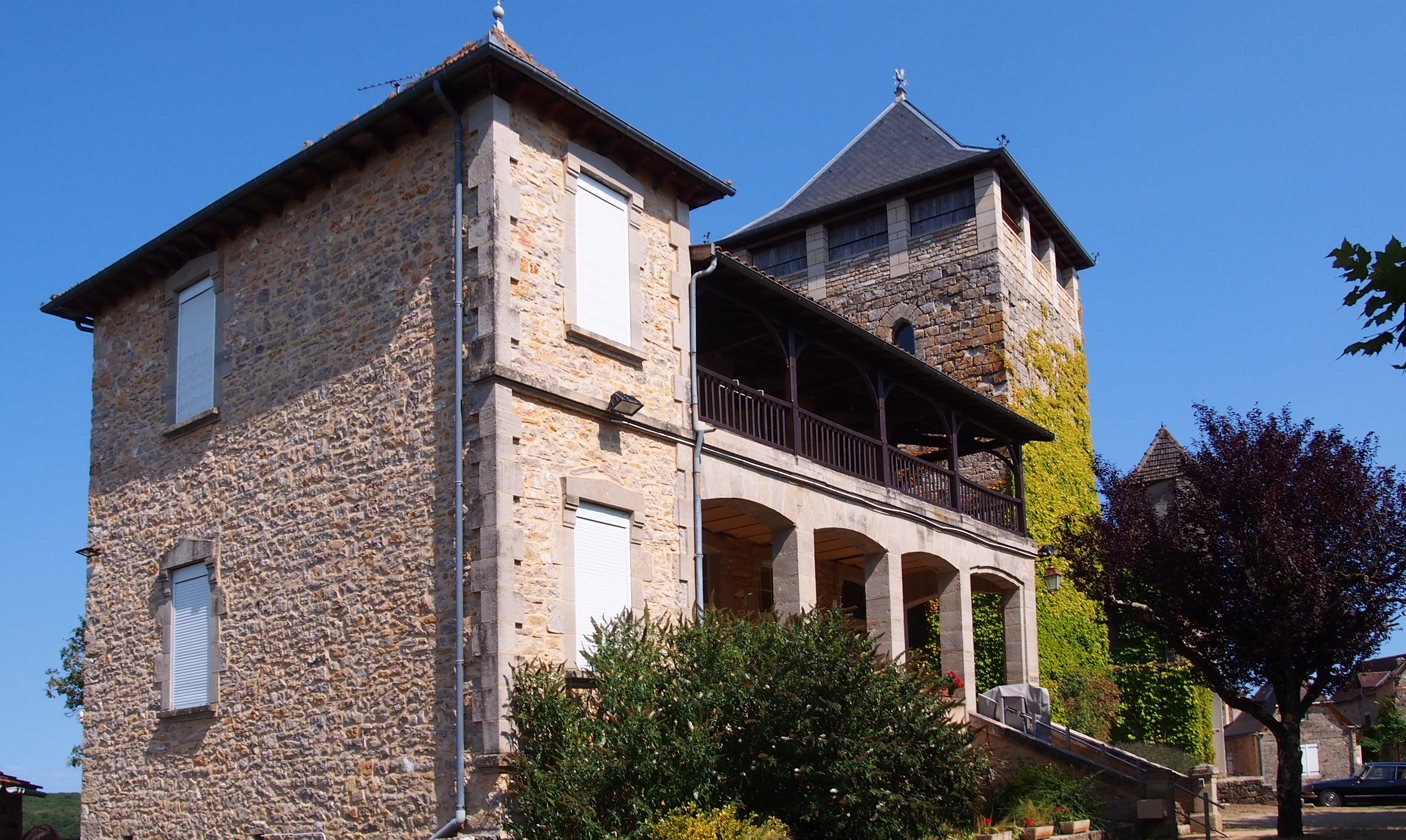
- Montsalès Town hall
- Location of Montsalès
- Location within France Location within Occitanie
- Coordinates: 44°29′30″N 1°57′50″E
- Country: France
- Region: Occitania
- Department: Aveyron
- Arrondissement: Villefranche-de-Rouergue
- Canton: Villeneuvois et Villefranchois

Government
  - Mayor (2020–2026): Benoît Marty
- Area^{1}: 12.47 km^{2} (4.81 sq mi)
- Elevation: 309 m (1,014 ft)
- Highest elevation: 369 m (1,211 ft)
- Lowest elevation: 178 m (584 ft)
- Population (2023): 319
  - Density: 25.6/km^{2} (66.3/sq mi)
- Time zone: UTC+01:00 (CET)
  - Summer (DST): UTC+02:00 (CEST)
- INSEE/Postal code: 12158 /12260
- ^{1} French Land Register data, which excludes lakes, ponds, glaciers > 1 km^{2} (0.386 sq mi or 247 acres) and river estuaries.

Montsalès (French pronunciation: [mɔ̃salɛs]; Occitan: Montsalés) is a commune in the Aveyron department in southern France.

== Population ==
Historical population
Year	Pop.	±% p.a.
1968	219	—
1975	195	−1.64%
1982	203	+0.58%
1990	199	−0.25%
1999	215	+0.86%
2007	234	+1.06%
2012	253	+1.57%
2017	330	+5.46%
2023	319	−0.56%
Source: INSEE

== See also ==
- Communes of the Aveyron department
