= La Fouillade =

Commune in Occitanie, France

- Commune
- Coat of arms
- Location of La Fouillade
- Location within France Location within Occitanie
- Coordinates: 44°13′55″N 2°02′34″E
- Country: France
- Region: Occitania
- Department: Aveyron
- Arrondissement: Villefranche-de-Rouergue
- Canton: Aveyron et Tarn

Government
  - Mayor (2020–2026): Dominique Rigal
- Area^{1}: 32.54 km^{2} (12.56 sq mi)
- Elevation: 395 m (1,296 ft)
- Highest elevation: 511 m (1,677 ft)
- Lowest elevation: 215 m (705 ft)
- Population (2023): 1,128
  - Density: 34.67/km^{2} (89.78/sq mi)
- Time zone: UTC+01:00 (CET)
  - Summer (DST): UTC+02:00 (CEST)
- INSEE/Postal code: 12105 /12270
- ^{1} French Land Register data, which excludes lakes, ponds, glaciers > 1 km^{2} (0.386 sq mi or 247 acres) and river estuaries.

La Fouillade (French pronunciation: [la fujad]; Occitan: La Folhada) is a commune in the Aveyron department in southern France.

== Population ==
Historical population
Year	Pop.	±% p.a.
1968	1,123	—
1975	1,154	+0.39%
1982	1,153	−0.01%
1990	1,041	−1.27%
1999	1,034	−0.07%
2007	1,114	+0.94%
2012	1,096	−0.33%
2017	1,081	−0.28%
2023	1,128	+0.71%
Source: INSEE

== See also ==
- Communes of the Aveyron department
