= Drulhe =

Commune in Occitanie, France

- Commune
- Location of Drulhe
- Location within France Location within Occitanie
- Coordinates: 44°27′47″N 2°07′48″E
- Country: France
- Region: Occitania
- Department: Aveyron
- Arrondissement: Villefranche-de-Rouergue
- Canton: Villeneuvois et Villefranchois
- Intercommunality: Plateau de Montbazens

Government
  - Mayor (2020–2026): Josiane Couzi
- Area^{1}: 18.03 km^{2} (6.96 sq mi)
- Elevation: 490 m (1,610 ft)
- Highest elevation: 523 m (1,716 ft)
- Lowest elevation: 276 m (906 ft)
- Population (2023): 448
  - Density: 24.8/km^{2} (64.4/sq mi)
- Time zone: UTC+01:00 (CET)
  - Summer (DST): UTC+02:00 (CEST)
- INSEE/Postal code: 12091 /12350
- ^{1} French Land Register data, which excludes lakes, ponds, glaciers > 1 km^{2} (0.386 sq mi or 247 acres) and river estuaries.

Drulhe (French pronunciation: [dʁyl]; Occitan: Drulha) is a commune in the Aveyron department in southern France.

== Population ==
Historical population
Year	Pop.	±% p.a.
1968	518	—
1975	468	−1.44%
1982	432	−1.14%
1990	395	−1.11%
1999	417	+0.60%
2007	397	−0.61%
2012	435	+1.85%
2017	446	+0.50%
2023	448	+0.07%
Source: INSEE

== See also ==
- Communes of the Aveyron department
