= Salvagnac-Cajarc =

Commune in Occitanie, France

- Commune
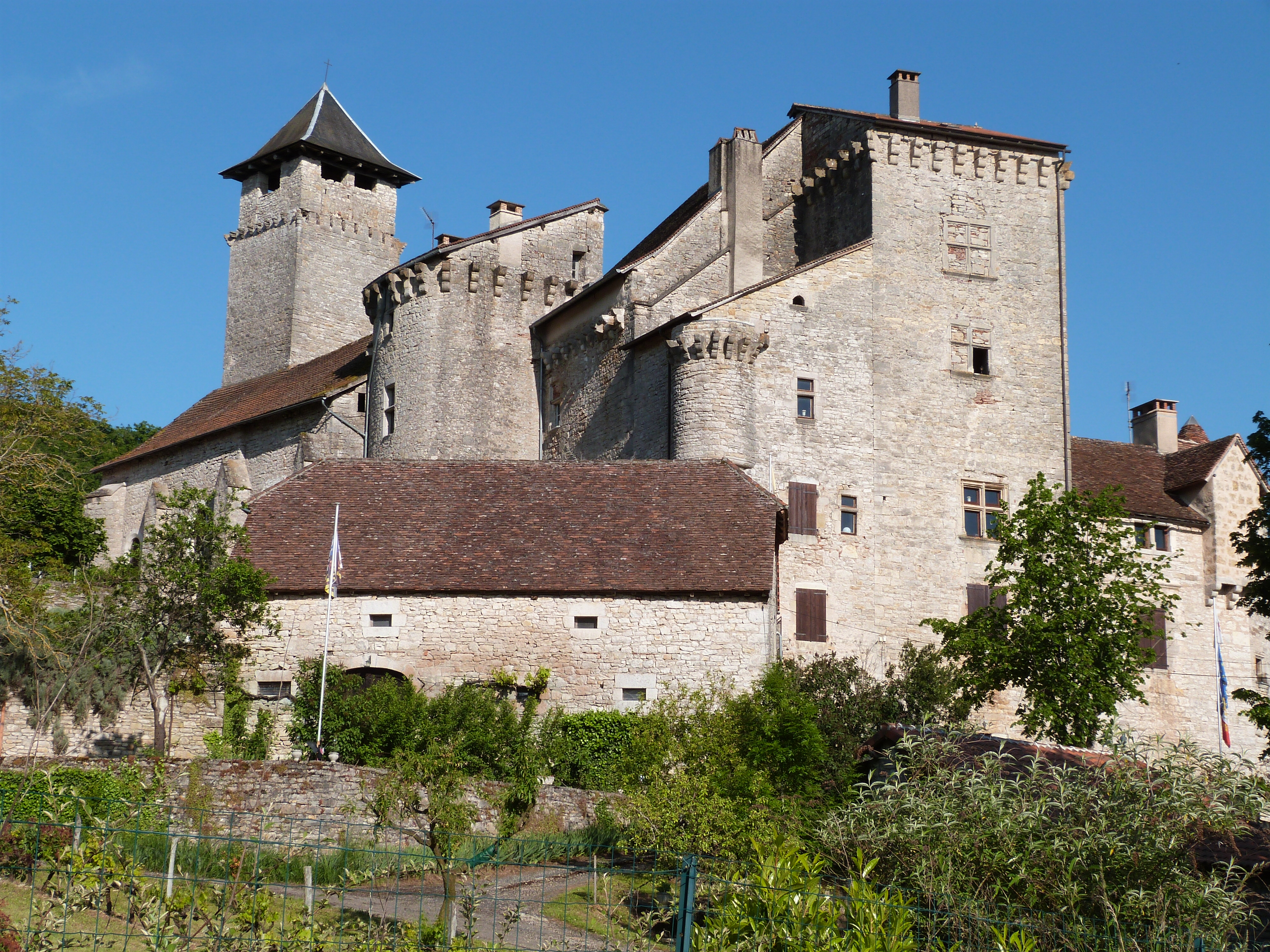
- The château in Salvagnac-Cajarc

- Coat of arms
- Location of Salvagnac-Cajarc
- Location within France Location within Occitanie
- Coordinates: 44°28′34″N 1°50′55″E
- Country: France
- Region: Occitania
- Department: Aveyron
- Arrondissement: Villefranche-de-Rouergue
- Canton: Villeneuvois et Villefranchois

Government
  - Mayor (2020–2026): Hervé Tastayre
- Area^{1}: 23.19 km^{2} (8.95 sq mi)
- Elevation: 300 m (980 ft)
- Highest elevation: 391 m (1,283 ft)
- Lowest elevation: 140 m (460 ft)
- Population (2023): 372
  - Density: 16.0/km^{2} (41.5/sq mi)
- Time zone: UTC+01:00 (CET)
  - Summer (DST): UTC+02:00 (CEST)
- INSEE/Postal code: 12256 /12260
- ^{1} French Land Register data, which excludes lakes, ponds, glaciers > 1 km^{2} (0.386 sq mi or 247 acres) and river estuaries.

Salvagnac-Cajarc (French pronunciation: [salvaɲak kaʒaʁ]; Occitan: Salvanhac de Cajarc) is a commune in the Aveyron department in southern France.

== Population ==
Historical population
Year	Pop.	±% p.a.
1968	257	—
1975	270	+0.71%
1982	317	+2.32%
1990	345	+1.06%
1999	353	+0.26%
2007	388	+1.19%
2012	359	−1.54%
2017	378	+1.04%
2023	372	−0.27%
Source: INSEE

== See also ==
- Communes of the Aveyron department
