= Causse-et-Diège =

Commune in Occitanie, France

- Commune
- Location of Causse-et-Diège
- Location within France Location within Occitanie
- Coordinates: 44°30′53″N 2°02′57″E
- Country: France
- Region: Occitania
- Department: Aveyron
- Arrondissement: Villefranche-de-Rouergue
- Canton: Lot et Montbazinois

Government
  - Mayor (2020–2026): Serge Masbou
- Area^{1}: 29.85 km^{2} (11.53 sq mi)
- Elevation: 344 m (1,129 ft)
- Highest elevation: 430 m (1,410 ft)
- Lowest elevation: 148 m (486 ft)
- Population (2023): 760
  - Density: 25/km^{2} (66/sq mi)
- Time zone: UTC+01:00 (CET)
  - Summer (DST): UTC+02:00 (CEST)
- INSEE/Postal code: 12257 /12700
- ^{1} French Land Register data, which excludes lakes, ponds, glaciers > 1 km^{2} (0.386 sq mi or 247 acres) and river estuaries.

Causse-et-Diège (French pronunciation: [kos e djɛʒ]; Occitan: Causse e Dièja) is a commune in the Aveyron department in southern France.

== Population ==
Historical population
Year	Pop.	±% p.a.
1968	676	—
1975	627	−1.07%
1982	607	−0.46%
1990	597	−0.21%
1999	624	+0.49%
2007	701	+1.47%
2012	723	+0.62%
2017	758	+0.95%
2023	760	+0.04%
Source: INSEE

== See also ==
- Communes of the Aveyron department
