= Morlhon-le-Haut =

Commune in Occitanie, France

- Commune
- Location of Morlhon-le-Haut
- Location within France Location within Occitanie
- Coordinates: 44°19′32″N 2°03′47″E
- Country: France
- Region: Occitania
- Department: Aveyron
- Arrondissement: Villefranche-de-Rouergue
- Canton: Aveyron et Tarn

Government
  - Mayor (2020–2026): Philippe Guilhen
- Area^{1}: 22.09 km^{2} (8.53 sq mi)
- Elevation: 530 m (1,740 ft)
- Highest elevation: 591 m (1,939 ft)
- Lowest elevation: 280 m (920 ft)
- Population (2023): 555
  - Density: 25.1/km^{2} (65.1/sq mi)
- Time zone: UTC+01:00 (CET)
  - Summer (DST): UTC+02:00 (CEST)
- INSEE/Postal code: 12159 /12200
- ^{1} French Land Register data, which excludes lakes, ponds, glaciers > 1 km^{2} (0.386 sq mi or 247 acres) and river estuaries.

Morlhon-le-Haut (French pronunciation: [mɔʁjɔ̃ lə o]; Occitan: Morlhon) is a commune in the Aveyron department in southern France.

== Population ==
Historical population
Year	Pop.	±% p.a.
1968	585	—
1975	519	−1.70%
1982	491	−0.79%
1990	531	+0.98%
1999	527	−0.08%
2007	550	+0.54%
2012	569	+0.68%
2017	557	−0.43%
2023	555	−0.06%
Source: INSEE

== See also ==
- Communes of the Aveyron department
