= Brandonnet =

Commune in Occitanie, France

- Commune
- Coat of arms
- Location of Brandonnet
- Location within France Location within Occitanie
- Coordinates: 44°23′19″N 2°08′10″E
- Country: France
- Region: Occitania
- Department: Aveyron
- Arrondissement: Villefranche-de-Rouergue
- Canton: Villeneuvois et Villefranchois
- Intercommunality: Plateau de Montbazens

Government
  - Mayor (2020–2026): Hervé Marty
- Area^{1}: 12.22 km^{2} (4.72 sq mi)
- Elevation: 400 m (1,300 ft)
- Highest elevation: 546 m (1,791 ft)
- Lowest elevation: 318 m (1,043 ft)
- Population (2023): 287
  - Density: 23.5/km^{2} (60.8/sq mi)
- Time zone: UTC+01:00 (CET)
  - Summer (DST): UTC+02:00 (CEST)
- INSEE/Postal code: 12034 /12350
- ^{1} French Land Register data, which excludes lakes, ponds, glaciers > 1 km^{2} (0.386 sq mi or 247 acres) and river estuaries.

Brandonnet (French pronunciation: [bʁɑ̃dɔnɛ]; Occitan: Brandonet) is a commune in the Aveyron department in southern France.

== Population ==
Historical population
Year	Pop.	±% p.a.
1968	417	—
1975	370	−1.69%
1982	360	−0.39%
1990	325	−1.27%
1999	316	−0.31%
2007	305	−0.44%
2012	314	+0.58%
2017	319	+0.32%
2023	287	−1.75%
Source: INSEE

== See also ==
- Communes of the Aveyron department
