= Savignac, Aveyron =

Commune in Occitanie, France

Savignac
- Commune
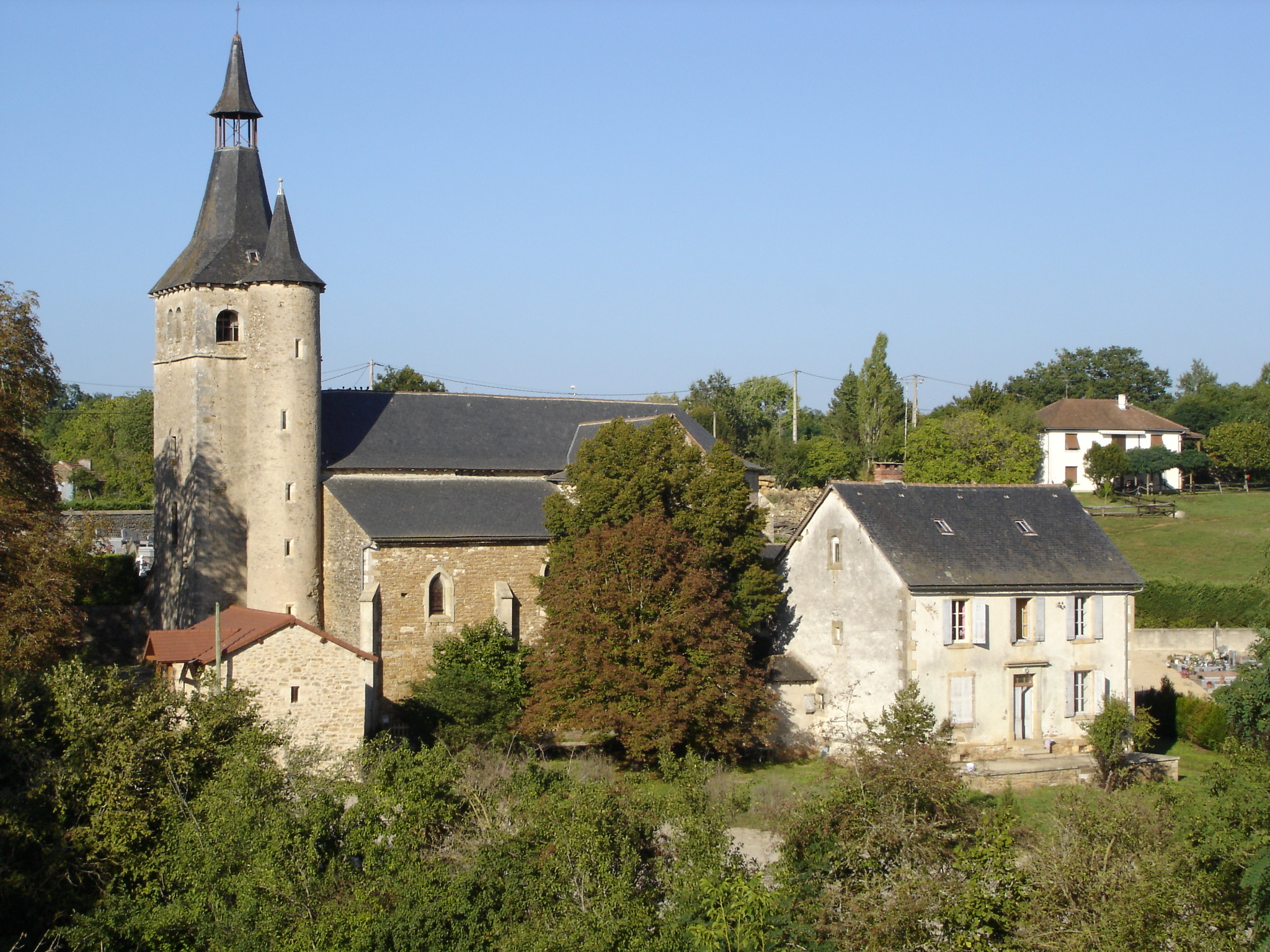
- The church in Savignac
- Location of Savignac
- Location within France Location within Occitanie
- Coordinates: 44°21′35″N 1°57′58″E
- Country: France
- Region: Occitania
- Department: Aveyron
- Arrondissement: Villefranche-de-Rouergue
- Canton: Villeneuvois et Villefranchois

Government
  - Mayor (2020–2026): Patrick Datchary
- Area^{1}: 15.28 km^{2} (5.90 sq mi)
- Elevation: 350 m (1,150 ft)
- Highest elevation: 420 m (1,380 ft)
- Lowest elevation: 333 m (1,093 ft)
- Population (2023): 746
  - Density: 48.8/km^{2} (126/sq mi)
- Time zone: UTC+01:00 (CET)
  - Summer (DST): UTC+02:00 (CEST)
- INSEE/Postal code: 12263 /12200
- ^{1} French Land Register data, which excludes lakes, ponds, glaciers > 1 km^{2} (0.386 sq mi or 247 acres) and river estuaries.

Savignac (French pronunciation: [saviɲak]; Occitan: Savinhac) is a commune in the Aveyron department in southern France.

== Population ==
Historical population
Year	Pop.	±% p.a.
1968	350	—
1975	319	−1.32%
1982	422	+4.08%
1990	508	+2.35%
1999	540	+0.68%
2007	601	+1.35%
2012	657	+1.80%
2017	721	+1.88%
2023	746	+0.57%
Source: INSEE

== See also ==
- Communes of the Aveyron department
