= Sainte-Croix, Aveyron =

Commune in Occitanie, France

Sainte-Croix
- Commune
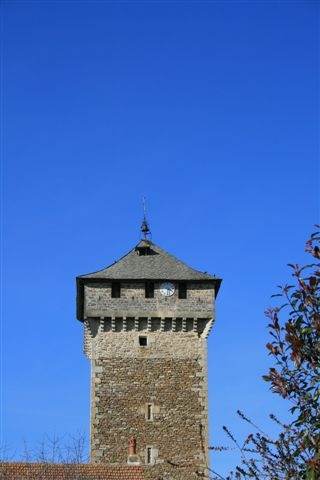
- Clock tower
- Location of Sainte-Croix
- Location within France Location within Occitanie
- Coordinates: 44°25′38″N 1°58′05″E
- Country: France
- Region: Occitania
- Department: Aveyron
- Arrondissement: Villefranche-de-Rouergue
- Canton: Villeneuvois et Villefranchois

Government
  - Mayor (2020–2026): Isabelle Laschon
- Area^{1}: 25.88 km^{2} (9.99 sq mi)
- Elevation: 400 m (1,300 ft)
- Highest elevation: 441 m (1,447 ft)
- Lowest elevation: 312 m (1,024 ft)
- Population (2023): 734
  - Density: 28.4/km^{2} (73.5/sq mi)
- Time zone: UTC+01:00 (CET)
  - Summer (DST): UTC+02:00 (CEST)
- INSEE/Postal code: 12217 /12260
- ^{1} French Land Register data, which excludes lakes, ponds, glaciers > 1 km^{2} (0.386 sq mi or 247 acres) and river estuaries.

Sainte-Croix (French pronunciation: [sɛ̃t kʁwa]; Languedocien: Santa Crotz) is a commune in the Aveyron department in southern France.

== Population ==
Historical population
Year	Pop.	±% p.a.
1968	539	—
1975	541	+0.05%
1982	601	+1.51%
1990	608	+0.14%
1999	632	+0.43%
2007	709	+1.45%
2012	726	+0.48%
2017	736	+0.27%
2023	734	−0.05%
Source: INSEE

== See also ==
- Communes of the Aveyron department
