= Maleville =

Commune in Occitanie, France

- Commune
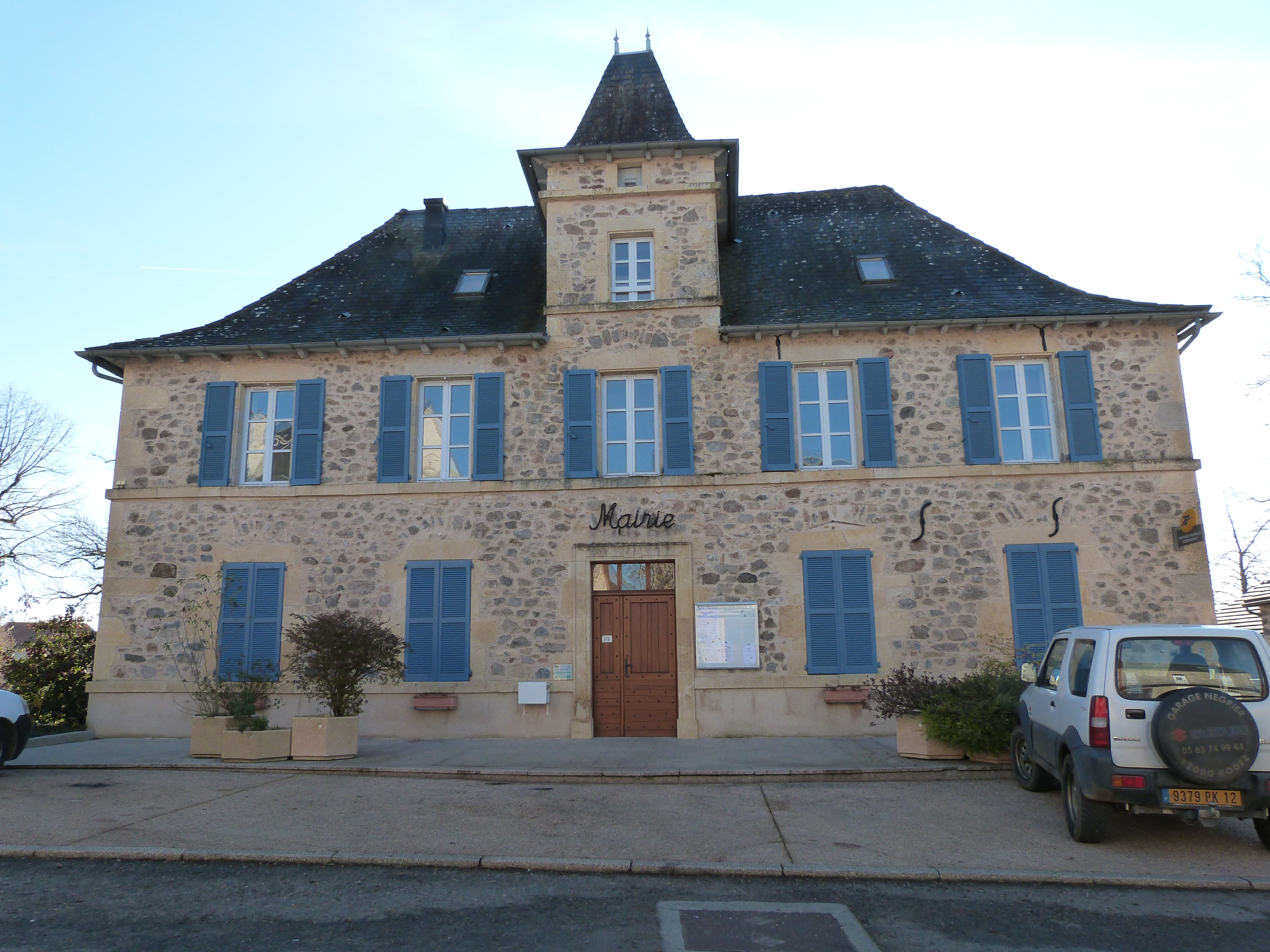
- Maleville Town hall

- Coat of arms
- Location of Maleville
- Location within France Location within Occitanie
- Coordinates: 44°23′54″N 2°06′10″E
- Country: France
- Region: Occitania
- Department: Aveyron
- Arrondissement: Villefranche-de-Rouergue
- Canton: Villeneuvois et Villefranchois
- Intercommunality: Ouest Aveyron Communauté

Government
  - Mayor (2020–2026): Fabienne Salesses
- Area^{1}: 36.35 km^{2} (14.03 sq mi)
- Elevation: 450 m (1,480 ft)
- Highest elevation: 555 m (1,821 ft)
- Lowest elevation: 280 m (920 ft)
- Population (2023): 967
  - Density: 26.6/km^{2} (68.9/sq mi)
- Time zone: UTC+01:00 (CET)
  - Summer (DST): UTC+02:00 (CEST)
- INSEE/Postal code: 12136 /12350
- ^{1} French Land Register data, which excludes lakes, ponds, glaciers > 1 km^{2} (0.386 sq mi or 247 acres) and river estuaries.

Maleville (French pronunciation: [malvil]; Occitan: Malavila) is a commune in the Aveyron department in southern France.

== Population ==
Historical population
Year	Pop.	±% p.a.
1968	1,010	—
1975	906	−1.54%
1982	919	+0.20%
1990	921	+0.03%
1999	905	−0.19%
2007	931	+0.35%
2012	949	+0.38%
2017	953	+0.08%
2023	967	+0.24%
Source: INSEE

== See also ==
- Communes of the Aveyron department
