= Canton of Villefranche-de-Rouergue =

Coordinates: 44.35°N 2.04°E

- Canton
- Situation of the canton of Villefranche-de-Rouergue in the department of Aveyron
- Country: France
- Region: Occitania
- Department: Aveyron
- No. of communes: {{{nbcomm}}}
- Population (2023): 12,696
- INSEE code: 1222

The canton of Villefranche-de-Rouergue is an administrative division of the Aveyron department, southern France. Its borders were modified at the French canton reorganisation which came into effect in March 2015. Its seat is in Villefranche-de-Rouergue.

It consists of the following communes:

1. La Rouquette
2. Vailhourles
3. Villefranche-de-Rouergue
