= Saujac =

Commune in Occitanie, France

- Commune
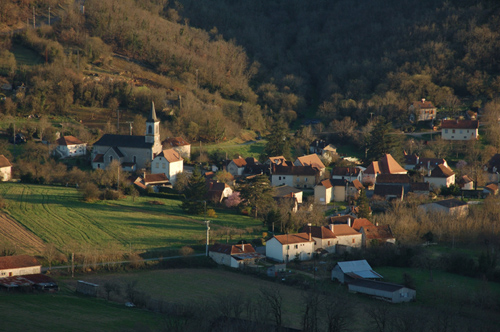
- A general view of Saujac
- Location of Saujac
- Location within France Location within Occitanie
- Coordinates: 44°29′51″N 1°53′34″E
- Country: France
- Region: Occitania
- Department: Aveyron
- Arrondissement: Villefranche-de-Rouergue
- Canton: Villeneuvois et Villefranchois

Government
  - Mayor (2020–2026): Gérard Agrech
- Area^{1}: 12.23 km^{2} (4.72 sq mi)
- Elevation: 200 m (660 ft)
- Highest elevation: 368 m (1,207 ft)
- Lowest elevation: 144 m (472 ft)
- Population (2023): 126
  - Density: 10.3/km^{2} (26.7/sq mi)
- Time zone: UTC+01:00 (CET)
  - Summer (DST): UTC+02:00 (CEST)
- INSEE/Postal code: 12261 /12260
- ^{1} French Land Register data, which excludes lakes, ponds, glaciers > 1 km^{2} (0.386 sq mi or 247 acres) and river estuaries.

Saujac (French pronunciation: [soʒak]) is a commune in the Aveyron department in southern France.

== Population ==
Historical population
| Year | Pop. | ±% p.a. |
|---|---|---|
| 1968 | 172 | — |
| 1975 | 161 | −0.94% |
| 1982 | 155 | −0.54% |
| 1990 | 136 | −1.62% |
| 1999 | 139 | +0.24% |
| 2007 | 134 | −0.46% |
| 2012 | 127 | −1.07% |
| 2017 | 125 | −0.32% |
| 2023 | 126 | +0.13% |
Source: INSEE

== See also ==
- Communes of the Aveyron department
