= Lanuéjouls =

Commune in Occitanie, France

- Commune
- Coat of arms
- Location of Lanuéjouls
- Location within France Location within Occitanie
- Coordinates: 44°25′34″N 2°09′39″E
- Country: France
- Region: Occitania
- Department: Aveyron
- Arrondissement: Villefranche-de-Rouergue
- Canton: Villeneuvois et Villefranchois
- Intercommunality: Plateau de Montbazens

Government
  - Mayor (2020–2026): Benoît Garric
- Area^{1}: 12 km^{2} (4.6 sq mi)
- Elevation: 500 m (1,600 ft)
- Highest elevation: 556 m (1,824 ft)
- Lowest elevation: 437 m (1,434 ft)
- Population (2023): 779
  - Density: 65/km^{2} (170/sq mi)
- Time zone: UTC+01:00 (CET)
  - Summer (DST): UTC+02:00 (CEST)
- INSEE/Postal code: 12121 /12350
- ^{1} French Land Register data, which excludes lakes, ponds, glaciers > 1 km^{2} (0.386 sq mi or 247 acres) and river estuaries.

Lanuéjouls (French pronunciation: [lanɥeʒul]; Occitan: Lanuèjols) is a commune in the Aveyron department in southern France.

== Population ==
Historical population
Year	Pop.	±% p.a.
1968	822	—
1975	777	−0.80%
1982	744	−0.62%
1990	650	−1.67%
1999	605	−0.79%
2007	715	+2.11%
2012	730	+0.42%
2017	731	+0.03%
2023	779	+1.07%
Source: INSEE

== See also ==
- Communes of the Aveyron department
