= La Capelle-Balaguier =

Commune in Occitanie, France

- Commune
- Location of La Capelle-Balaguier
- Location within France Location within Occitanie
- Coordinates: 44°26′17″N 1°56′16″E
- Country: France
- Region: Occitania
- Department: Aveyron
- Arrondissement: Villefranche-de-Rouergue
- Canton: Villeneuvois et Villefranchois

Government
  - Mayor (2020–2026): Pierre Viven
- Area^{1}: 13.36 km^{2} (5.16 sq mi)
- Elevation: 300 m (980 ft)
- Highest elevation: 400 m (1,300 ft)
- Lowest elevation: 214 m (702 ft)
- Population (2023): 346
  - Density: 25.9/km^{2} (67.1/sq mi)
- Time zone: UTC+01:00 (CET)
  - Summer (DST): UTC+02:00 (CEST)
- INSEE/Postal code: 12053 /12260
- ^{1} French Land Register data, which excludes lakes, ponds, glaciers > 1 km^{2} (0.386 sq mi or 247 acres) and river estuaries.

La Capelle-Balaguier (French pronunciation: [la kapɛl balaɡje]; Occitan: La Capèla de Balaguièr) is a commune in the Aveyron department in southern France.

== Population ==
Historical population
Year	Pop.	±% p.a.
1968	206	—
1975	215	+0.61%
1982	227	+0.78%
1990	246	+1.01%
1999	240	−0.27%
2007	281	+1.99%
2012	289	+0.56%
2017	306	+1.15%
2023	346	+2.07%
Source: INSEE

== See also ==
- Communes of the Aveyron department
