= Privezac =

Commune in Occitanie, France

- Commune
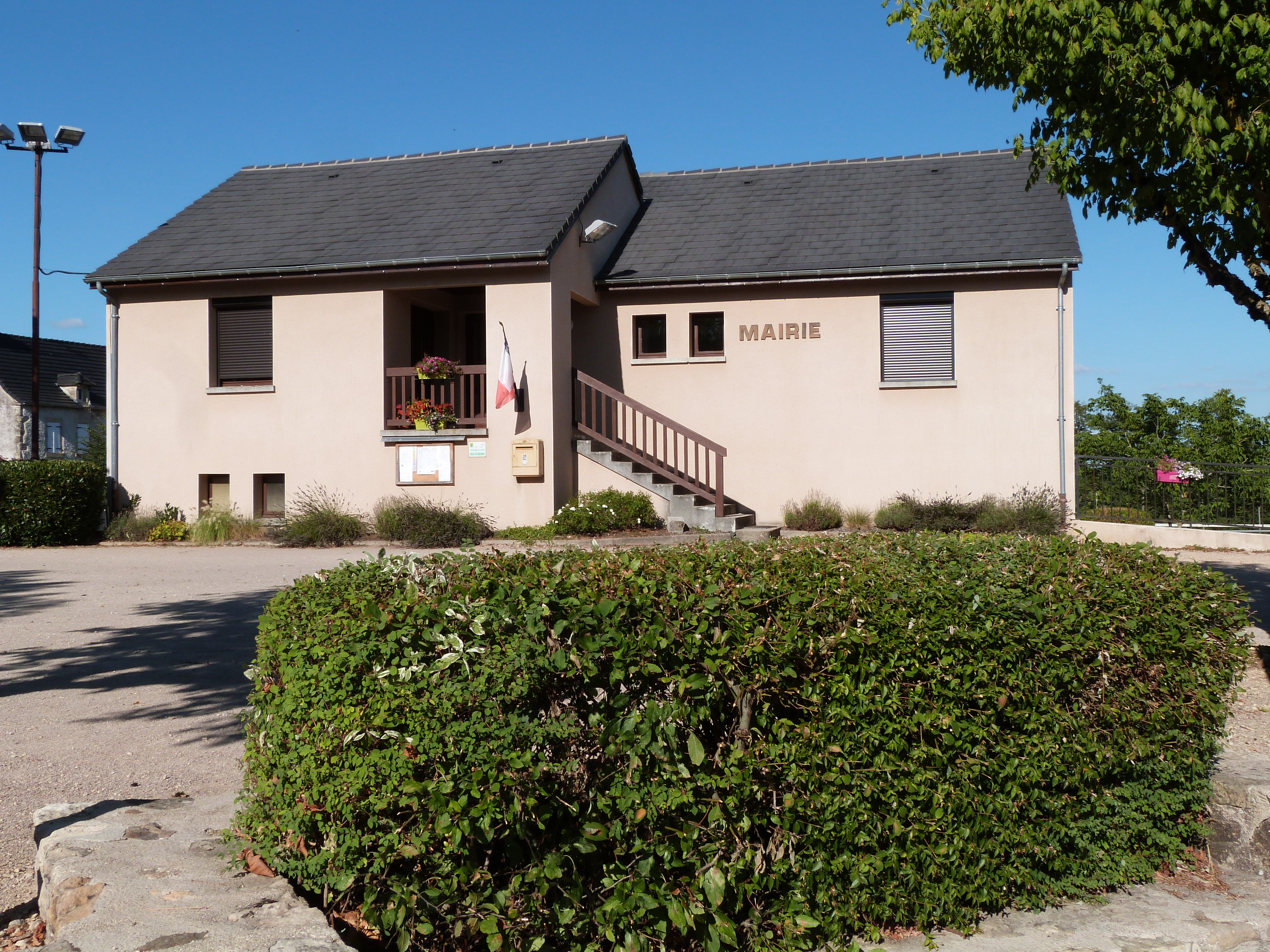
- Privezac Town hall
- Location of Privezac
- Location within France Location within Occitanie
- Coordinates: 44°24′47″N 2°11′18″E
- Country: France
- Region: Occitania
- Department: Aveyron
- Arrondissement: Villefranche-de-Rouergue
- Canton: Villeneuvois et Villefranchois
- Intercommunality: Plateau de Montbazens

Government
  - Mayor (2020–2026): Gilles Chahinian
- Area^{1}: 11.09 km^{2} (4.28 sq mi)
- Elevation: 498 m (1,634 ft)
- Highest elevation: 595 m (1,952 ft)
- Lowest elevation: 436 m (1,430 ft)
- Population (2023): 350
  - Density: 32/km^{2} (82/sq mi)
- Time zone: UTC+01:00 (CET)
  - Summer (DST): UTC+02:00 (CEST)
- INSEE/Postal code: 12191 /12350
- ^{1} French Land Register data, which excludes lakes, ponds, glaciers > 1 km^{2} (0.386 sq mi or 247 acres) and river estuaries.

Privezac (French pronunciation: [pʁivzak]; Occitan: Privasac) is a commune in the Aveyron department in southern France.

== Population ==
Historical population
Year	Pop.	±% p.a.
1968	340	—
1975	320	−0.86%
1982	322	+0.09%
1990	282	−1.64%
1999	273	−0.36%
2007	323	+2.12%
2012	340	+1.03%
2017	323	−1.02%
2023	350	+1.35%
Source: INSEE

== See also ==
- Communes of the Aveyron department
