= Castles in Aveyron =

Castles in the Aveyron département of France

There are numerous castles in the Aveyron département of France. Many are little more than ruins and some are barely discernible, while others have been converted into modern homes. Castles or their remains may be found at the following locations, among others:

- Belcastel The oldest part of the Château de Belcastel dates back to the 9th century. (44°23′20″N 2°20′10″E)
- Bertholène The Château des Bourines was built in the 13th, 14th and 15th centuries. It has been listed as monument historique since 1963. (44°25′8″N 2°48′34″E)
- Bousquet 14th century castle, intact and occupied, in the village of Le Bousquet, commune of Montpeyroux.(44°39′25″N 2°48′27″E)
- Coupiac 15th century Château de Coupiac. (43°57′15″N 2°34′53″E)
- Espalion The Château de Calmont d'Olt overlooks the town. (44°31′4″N 2°45′10″E). The Château de Masse, also in Espalion, is another castle which is a protected monument historique. (44°32′22″N 2°47′10″E)
- Estaing The Château d'Estaing was built in the 15th century, with alterations in the 16th and 17th centuries. It was vandalised during the French Revolution and confiscated as a national asset. In 1863, it became a convent. In 1930 a new chapel was built near the 15th century chapel. After the Second World War, the castle was converted into a religious retreat. The castle consists of buildings of different heights arranged around a terrace. (44°33′14″N 2°40′22″E)
- Fayet Château de Fayet (43°48′12″N 2°56′28″E)
- Flagnac The ruins of the Château de Pagax date from the 15th century and have been a protected monument historique since 1978. (44°35′4″N 2°16′17″E)
- Gabriac The Château de Tholet was originally built in the 16th century and altered in the 19th century. Preserved are the keep, a tower and the surrounding enceinte. It is privately owned and has been protected as a monument historique since 1946. (44°27′4″N 2°46′42″E)
- Gissac With origins going back to the 10th century, the Château de Montaigut ruins have been restored. (43°53′9″N 2°52′48″E)
- Lacroix-Barrez Château de Valon is a ruined hilltop castle from the 14th century, protected as a monument historique since 1925. (44°44′17″N 2°38′1″E)
- Lapanouse The Château de Loupiac has been protected as a monument historique since 1928. (44°20′36″N 3°1′6″E)
- Lassouts The Château de Roquelaure is a 12th-century noted for its chapel and interior decor. The property of the commune, it has been protected as a monument historique since 1981. (44°29′34″N 2°49′22″E)
- Marnhagues-et-Latour Château de Latour (43°52′21″N 3°1′49″E)
- Montjaux The Château de Montjaux dates from the 15th century. (44°6′7″N 2°53′56″E)
- Montpeyroux The Château du Bousquet is a 14th-century castle. Of note are the façades, roofs, tower, kitchen and the dining room with wood panelling. On the first floor, the great hall has a painted wooden chimney. The chapel door and painted ceiling are also noteworthy. Privately owned, it has been protected as a monument historique since 1928. (44°39′24″N 2°48′28″E)
- Mostuéjouls The Château de Mostuéjouls (built in the 13th century, with additions and alterations in the 15th, 17th and 18th) is particularly noted for its wall paintings dating from the early 16th century. (44°12′14″N 3°11′1″E)
- Mouret Château de la Servayrie (44°31′5″N 2°30′48″E) and Château Mage.
- Najac The Château de Najac was built in 1253 on the site of an older castle. (44°13′6″N 1°58′24″E)
- Naussac The Château de Marinesque dates from the 14th century and is a protected monument historique. (44°29′53″N 2°5′42″E)
- Peyrusse-le-Roc The Château Inférieur is a 12th/13th century castle with a history going back much further. It was already in ruins by 1668 and, today, all that remains are two towers. (44°29′54″N 2°8′20″E)
- Pomayrols (44°28′17″N 3°1′28″E)
- Pruines The Château de Pruines, dating back to the 15th century, has been much modified over the centuries. (44°31′46.5″N 2°30′12.5″E)
- Recoules-Prévinquières There are two castles here. The Château de Recoules has a history going back to the 13th century. In 1853, it was bought the baron de Gaujal who gave the castle its present appearance. The edifice is composed of four buildings with towers around a small courtyard. Inside, several rooms are interesting for their decor including painted canvas, inlaid parquet flooring and painted walls. It has been protected as a monument historique since 2001. (44°20′23″N 2°58′7″E). The Château du Méjanel dates from the 15th and 16th centuries and is also a monument historique, noted for its façades and roofs as well as monumental chimney in the great hall on the first floor. (44°19′11″N 2°58′12″E)
- Rivière-sur-Tarn The Château de Peyrelade was strategically one of the most important castles in the Rouergue and the site of many battles between its construction in the 12th century and its destruction in 1633. (44°11′43″N 3°8′52″E)
- Saint-Affrique The Château de Mas Rougier is a privately owned 14th century castle, with a tower, turret, the elevation and roof protected as a monument historique since 1979. (44°0′2″N 2°56′41″E)
- Saint-Côme-d'Olt See Château de Saint-Côme-d'Olt (44°30′55″N 2°48′53″E)
- Saint-Izaire The Château de Saint-Izaire is a 14th-century episcopal castle. (43°58′31″N 2°43′10″E)
- Saint-Rome-de-Cernon The Château de Mélac is located in the hamlet of Mélac in the commune Saint-Rome-de-Cernon. In the Middle Ages, the castle was linked to the Gozon family. The castle's construction dates back to the 14th century, with modifications up to the 16th century. The castle is privately owned and open to the public. It has been listed as a monument historique since 1992. (44°0′56″N 3°0′26″E)
- Salles-la-Source The Château du Colombier dates from the 14th and 15th centuries. The buildings are arranged around a small interior paved courtyard. The castle is representative of the seigneurial and domestic architecture of the Rouergue between the 14th and 19th centuries. The simple square 14th century keep is used as a pigeon loft. The north wing was altered in the 19th century. The Château du Colombier is privately owned and has been protected as a monument historique since 1995. (44°29′16″N 2°31′47″E)
- Salvagnac-Cajarc The castle, built in the 13th and 15th centuries, is an example of mediaeval fortification. It has been a protected monument historique since 1991. Especially noteworthy are the roofs, the round tower and its staircase and the inner courtyard and its walls. On the second floor, a vaulted room contains 17th-century painting. (44°28′31″N 1°50′50″E)
- Savignac The Château de la Pèze was acquired by the Pomairols family in the 16th century. The poet Charles de Pomairols lived there (1835–1916). The buildings were modified in the 18th and 19th centuries. (44°22′17″N 1°58′27″E)
- Sénergues There are two castles in the commune. The Château de Montarnal was a fortified site in the 11th century, evidenced by the circular south tower. New fortifications were undertaken around the middle of the 14th century (seigneurial hall). In the Middle Ages, the castle was used as an entrepôt for the transport of wood, wine and salt - a cave was used as a warehouse. The site was a stop on the pilgrim route to Saint-Jacques de Compostelle. The architectural and military layout is unique in the Rouergue. The castle today still has the keep, enceinte, courtyard and the cave. (44°38′45″N 2°26′45″E). The Château de Sénergues dates from the 11th and 12th centuries. (44°36′20″N 2°29′9″E)
- Sévérac-le-Château The Château de Sévérac is a 13th-century castle open to the public. (44°19′23″N 3°4′7″E)
- Toulonjac The origins of the Château de Toulonjac go back to the 15th century. It was heavily modified in the 17th and 19th centuries. The kitchen contains a 15th-century chimney. The eastern part was added in the 19th century. Wallpaper dated from the 1840s is decorated with the theme of Don Quixote. The Château de Toulonjac is privately owned and has been protected as a monument historique since 1993. (44°22′57″N 1°59′59″E)
- Versols-et-Lapeyre The Château de Versols was built in the 14th century, with additions and alterations in the 16th and 17th. It is particularly noted for its façades and roofs and remains of murals. Privately owned, the castle has been a protected monument historique since 1988. (43°53′35″N 2°55′59″E)
- Vézins-de-Lévézou The Château de Vezins built 1120 and much altered. (44°16′47″N 2°57′11″E)
- Villeneuve The 14th century Château de Ginals was modified in the 17th and 18th centuries. It is noted for its keep and spiral staircase. Internally, the ground floor dining room contains a large stone chimney. On the first floor, the grand salon and two interconnecting smaller salons are decorated with plasterwork. Saint Emilie de Rodat spent her childhood here and is supposed to have had a revelation here of her religious vocation. The Château de Ginals is privately owned and has been protected as a monument historique since 1980. (44°24′48″N 2°0′23″E)

== See also ==
List of castles in France
