= Château de Fayet =

Castle in France

Coordinates: 43°48′12″N 2°56′28″E

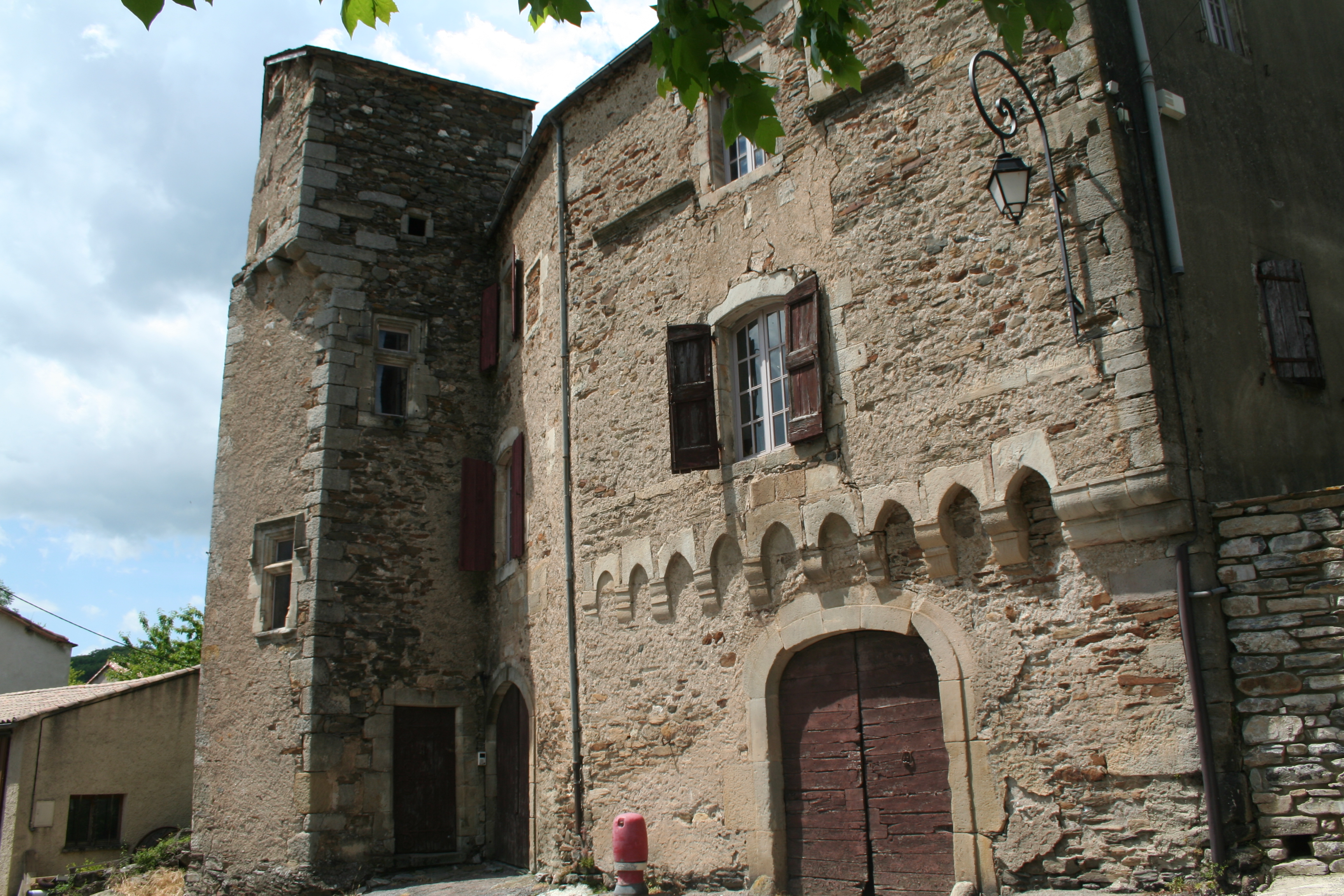
Château de Fayet

The Château de Fayet is a castle in the commune of Fayet in the Aveyron département of France.

== History ==
The first lords of Brusque and Fayet were the viscounts of Albi in the 11th century, the viscounts of Béziers and Carcassonne in the 12th century, the counts of Toulouse in the 13th century, and, finally, the lords of Castelnau-Bretenoux in the 14th century.

In the 16th century, the daughter of Guy de Castelnau, Jacquette de Clermont, married Jean V de Arpajon and her dowry was used for the restoration and enlargement of the castle. The stone balustrade, decorated with two harps (the coat of arms of the powerful family of Rouergue), dates from this time.

Henri de Navarre, the future Henry IV, resided for a period in the Château de Fayet and would have seen the row of living rooms that was, at the time, entirely made of papered hangings. Some of these were framed decorations painted using dyes made by Rougier de Camarès. These paintings formed the basis of many frescoes, particularly the ceilings. Themes of these frescoes included symbols of the Compagnons du Devoir, other icons of esoteric significance, rich decorations with precious stones, and also representations of the arts.

The castle belonged to the scions of Jacquette and Jean V of Arpajon, among them François, count of Roussy, whose daughter married the duke and marshal of Biron. In the French Revolution, the latter, old and deaf, was condemned to the guillotine for conspiring against the Republic. Before the execution, the duchess of Biron had time to sell the castle to André Jean Simon of Nougarède, titled baron of Brusque and Fayet by the emperor Napoleon I.

The second baron of Fayet, having no descendants, sold the castle to a pair of men named Soulas and Roques. They completed some work on the castle to restore the authenticity of its appearance. Subsequently, the castle was purchased by Cabanel, priest of Notre Dame des Tables à Montpellier, who, using an anonymous gift of a million Franks, became the owner of the castle and its fields. The gift was to be used for the creation of an orphanage directed by monks of the congregation of Salesians, followers of Saint Jean de Bosco.

In 1999, Pierre Dussert bought the Château de Fayet. He started the association Friends of the Château de Fayet (French: Les Amis du Château de Fayet) to restore life to the site. The Château de Fayet is one of a group of 23 castles in Aveyron who have joined to provide a tourist itinerary as La Route des Seigneurs du Rouergue. It has welcomed many visitors from all around the world and hosted many events, but at the moment, it is on sale.

== Architecture ==
Built over a hillock, the Château de Fayet dominates the valley. Militarily positioned behind the Rance River with direct contacts with the Albigeois. The exit of the gorge was once part of the Château de Brusque, but it was partly demolished in the 13th century to become the common priory and seigniory of Fayet.

A chapel originally marked the confluence of Nuéjouls and Dourdou de Camarès; a defensive building, surrounded by ditches, replaced it in order to monitor the banks and formed a secondary line of defense.

The current castle building forms a punctuated regular parallelogram. The Renaissance Italian architect who designed the castle added a line of trees to shelter the castle from inquisitive eyes. Once past the long alley bordered with lime and chestnut trees, one lands on the main courtyard of the castle. The eye-shaped courtyard contains a fountain with a double basin and a majestic well. The stone edge wall, in the shape of a pot, is supported by two pillars built in 1564 by Guy de Castelnau.

== See also ==
- List of castles in France
- Route des Seigneurs du Rouergue
