= Brusque =

Brusque may refer to:

- Brusque, Aveyron, France
- Brusque, Santa Catarina, Brazil
- Brusque Futebol Clube, Brazilian football (soccer) club

== People with the surname ==
- Nicolas Brusque (born 1976), French rugby union footballer
