= Château de Saint-Côme-d'Olt =

Medieval castle in Occitania, France

Coordinates: 44°30′55″N 2°48′53″E

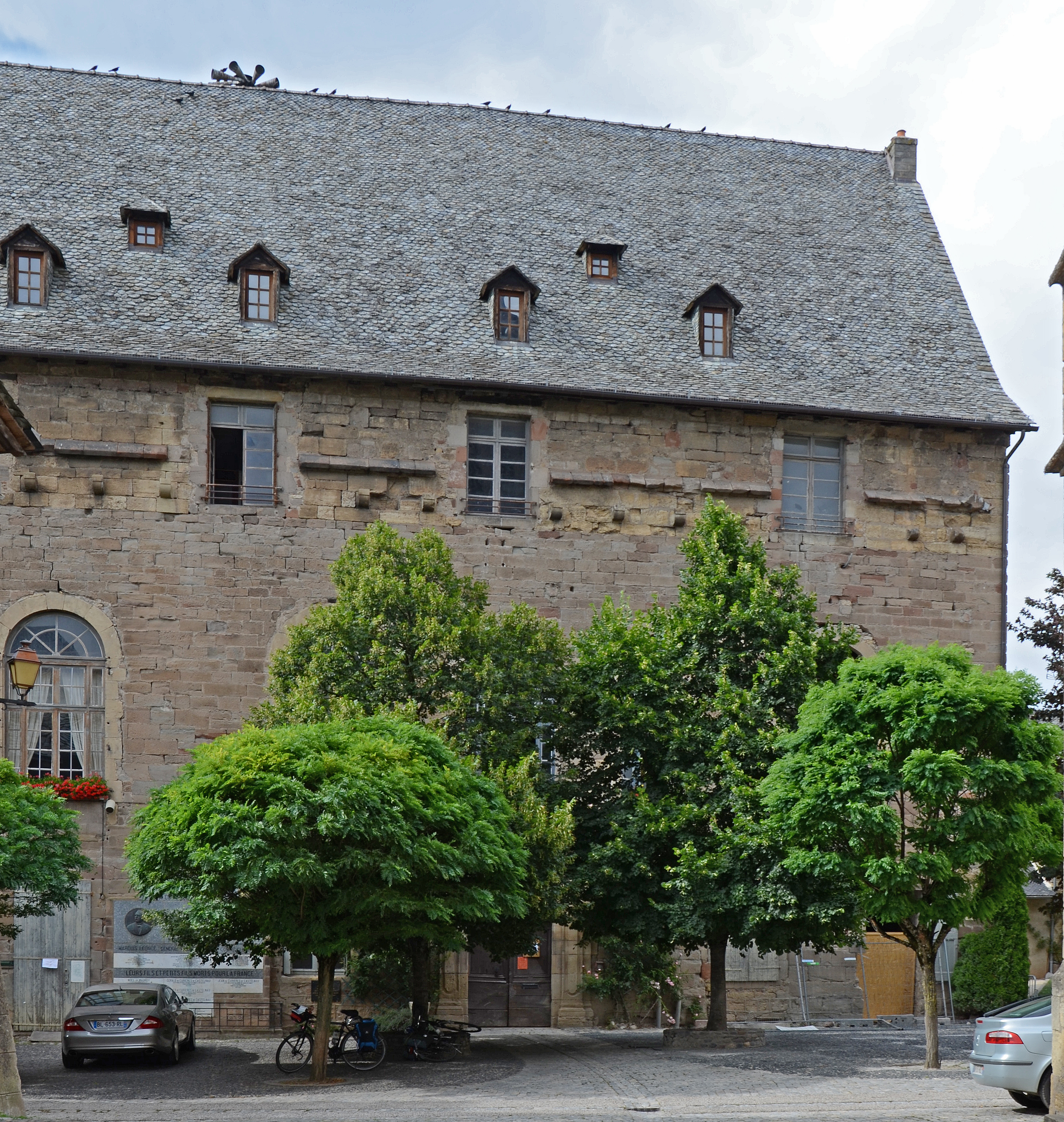
Town hall of Saint-Côme-d'Olt, Aveyron, France

The Château de Saint-Côme-d'Olt is a medieval castle in the commune of Saint-Côme-d'Olt in the Aveyron département of France. It was the residence of the lords of Calmont and Castenau and is now the town hall.

The castle was built in the 14th century at the heart of the fortified town and was associated with the Castelnau family, owners of the area for at least seven centuries. It has been listed since 1999 as a monument historique by the French Ministry of Culture.

== See also ==
- List of castles in France
