= Château de Saint-Izaire =

14th-century castle in Aveyron, France

Coordinates: 43°58′31″N 2°43′10″E

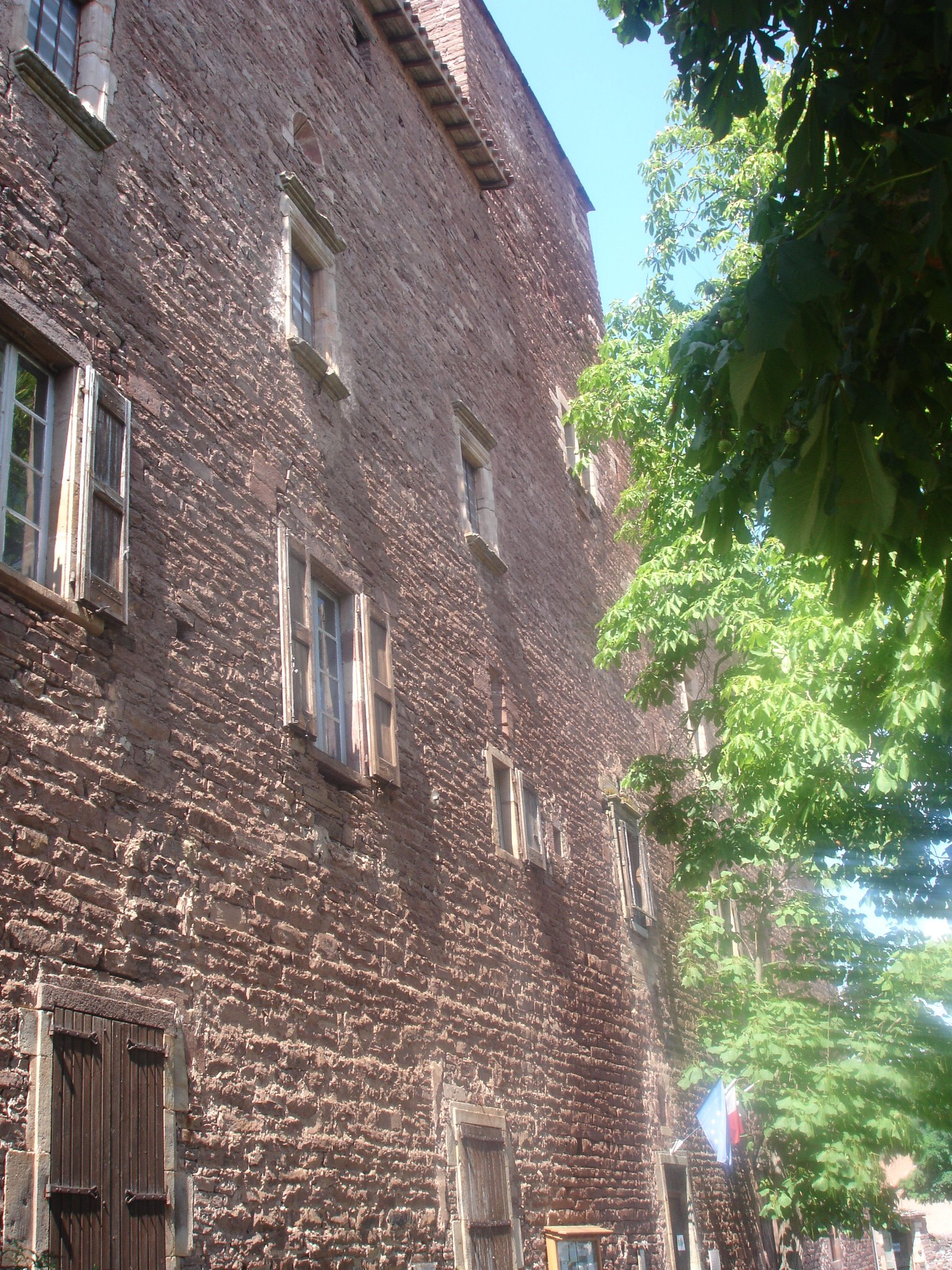
Château de Saint-Izaire

The Château de Saint-Izaire is a 14th-century episcopal castle in the commune of Saint-Izaire in the Aveyron département of France. Since 1991 it has been classified as a historical monument (French: monument historique). It is maintained by an association known as Vie et Château (Life and Castle), who have created a mini museum on the premises to record the history of the castle and the inhabitants of the village of Saint-Izaire.

The Château de Saint-Izaire is one of a group of 23 castles in Aveyron who have joined to provide a tourist itinerary as the Route des Seigneurs du Rouergue.

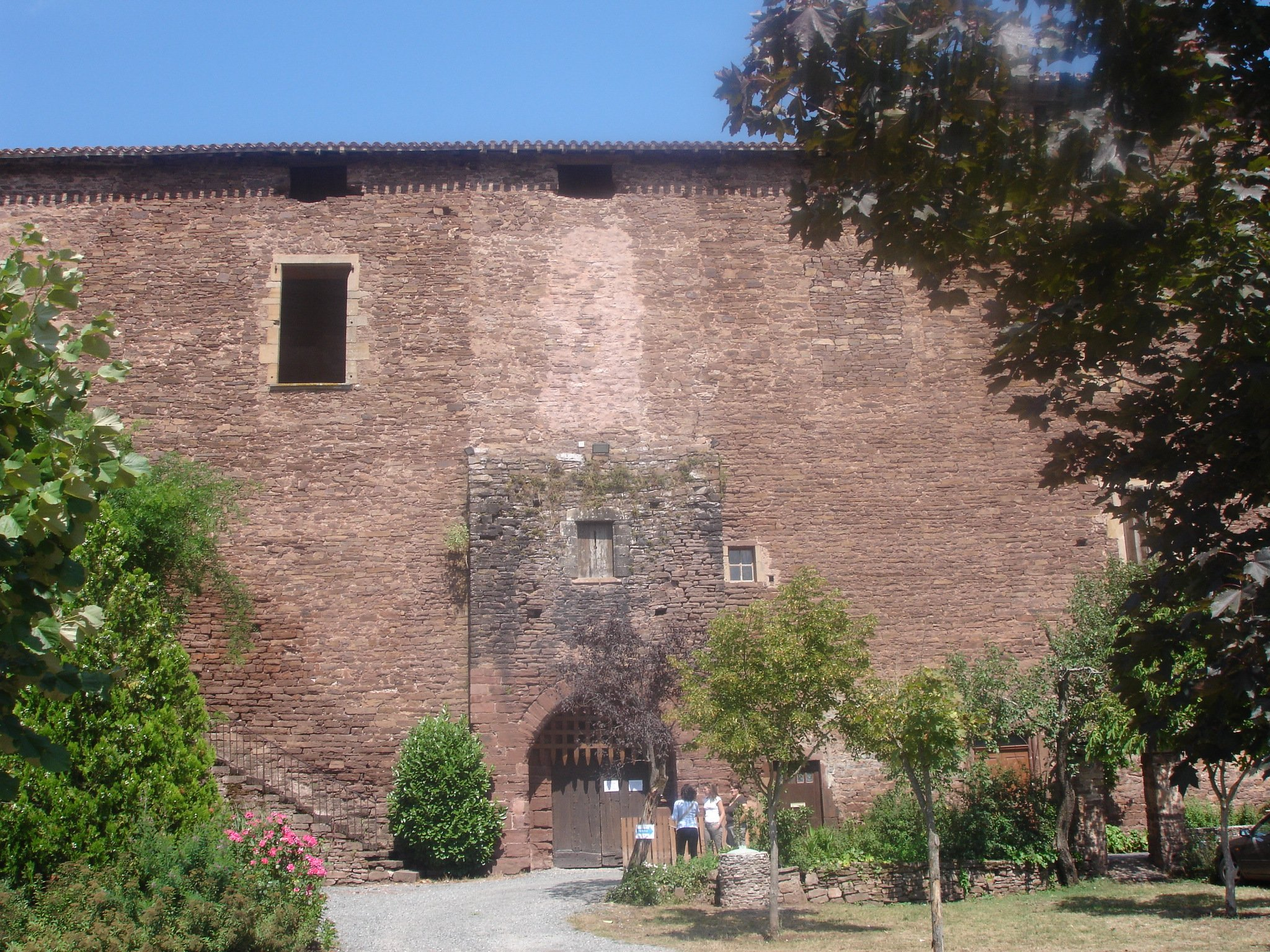
Facade of the Château

== Architecture ==
The castle is a massive quadrangular red stone building that shelters the town hall of the village of Saint-Izaire. The structure is supported by a keep-tower in the southern wing (partially demolished since the 19th century). This keep contains mural frescoes dating from the 14th century, and the ceiling in the room of the bishops in the Baroque style of the 17th century.

The castle was built by Guillaume Rotlindes, ancestor of the current Rollinde de Beaumont. It was intended as a gift to the Abbey of Vabres, close to the commune of Saint-Affrique: the deed attesting the gift is preserved to the present day. The castle was often used as a summer residence by the abbey. When the cathedral and palace of Vabres were razed in the wars of religion, the castle was used by refugees from the abbey.

== See also ==
- List of castles in France
- Route des Seigneurs du Rouergue
