= Montlaur, Aveyron =

Commune in Occitanie, France

Montlaur
- Commune
- Location of Montlaur
- Location within France Location within Occitanie
- Coordinates: 43°52′48″N 2°50′04″E
- Country: France
- Region: Occitania
- Department: Aveyron
- Arrondissement: Millau
- Canton: Causses-Rougiers

Government
  - Mayor (2020–2026): Patrick Rivemale
- Area^{1}: 41.57 km^{2} (16.05 sq mi)
- Elevation: 350 m (1,150 ft)
- Highest elevation: 681 m (2,234 ft)
- Lowest elevation: 330 m (1,080 ft)
- Population (2023): 663
  - Density: 15.9/km^{2} (41.3/sq mi)
- Time zone: UTC+01:00 (CET)
  - Summer (DST): UTC+02:00 (CEST)
- INSEE/Postal code: 12154 /12400
- ^{1} French Land Register data, which excludes lakes, ponds, glaciers > 1 km^{2} (0.386 sq mi or 247 acres) and river estuaries.

Montlaur (French pronunciation: [mɔ̃lɔʁ]) is a commune in the Aveyron department in southern France.

== Geography ==
The Dourdou de Camarès forms part of the commune's southeastern border, flows northwestward through the middle of the commune, then forms part of its northwestern border.

The village lies in the northern part of the commune, on the left bank of the Dourdou de Camarès.

== Climate ==
On average, Montlaur experiences 55.0 days per year with a minimum temperature below 0 °C (32.0 °F), 1.0 days per year with a minimum temperature below −10 °C (14.0 °F), 2.9 days per year with a maximum temperature below 0 °C (32.0 °F), and 33.4 days per year with a maximum temperature above 30 °C (86.0 °F). The record high temperature was 40.3 °C (104.5 °F) on 12 August 2003, while the record low temperature was −13.3 °C (8.1 °F) on 1 March 2005.

Climate data for Montlaur (1991–2020 normals, extremes 2002–present)
Month	Jan	Feb	Mar	Apr	May	Jun	Jul	Aug	Sep	Oct	Nov	Dec	Year
Record high °C (°F)	16.5 (61.7)	23.3 (73.9)	25.5 (77.9)	29.9 (85.8)	32.7 (90.9)	39.0 (102.2)	38.5 (101.3)	40.3 (104.5)	36.0 (96.8)	31.0 (87.8)	23.8 (74.8)	19.5 (67.1)	40.3 (104.5)
Mean daily maximum °C (°F)	8.1 (46.6)	9.4 (48.9)	13.3 (55.9)	16.8 (62.2)	20.5 (68.9)	25.9 (78.6)	28.4 (83.1)	28.1 (82.6)	23.9 (75.0)	18.6 (65.5)	12.6 (54.7)	8.9 (48.0)	17.9 (64.2)
Daily mean °C (°F)	4.6 (40.3)	4.9 (40.8)	8.0 (46.4)	11.2 (52.2)	14.6 (58.3)	19.2 (66.6)	21.4 (70.5)	21.1 (70.0)	17.5 (63.5)	13.8 (56.8)	8.9 (48.0)	5.3 (41.5)	12.5 (54.6)
Mean daily minimum °C (°F)	1.2 (34.2)	0.4 (32.7)	2.6 (36.7)	5.5 (41.9)	8.6 (47.5)	12.6 (54.7)	14.4 (57.9)	14.0 (57.2)	11.1 (52.0)	9.1 (48.4)	5.2 (41.4)	1.7 (35.1)	7.2 (45.0)
Record low °C (°F)	−11.4 (11.5)	−11.3 (11.7)	−13.3 (8.1)	−6.5 (20.3)	−1.6 (29.1)	3.0 (37.4)	7.2 (45.0)	5.4 (41.7)	1.4 (34.5)	−4.2 (24.4)	−9.4 (15.1)	−10.6 (12.9)	−13.3 (8.1)
Average precipitation mm (inches)	73.5 (2.89)	47.9 (1.89)	57.0 (2.24)	72.2 (2.84)	67.7 (2.67)	47.2 (1.86)	40.1 (1.58)	47.3 (1.86)	49.9 (1.96)	71.0 (2.80)	69.8 (2.75)	61.8 (2.43)	705.4 (27.77)
Average precipitation days (≥ 1.0 mm)	10.5	7.7	9.2	8.5	8.5	6.0	5.3	5.1	5.2	7.6	9.7	9.4	92.7
Source: Meteociel

== Population ==
Historical population
Year	Pop.	±% p.a.
1968	657	—
1975	608	−1.10%
1982	557	−1.24%
1990	556	−0.02%
1999	581	+0.49%
2007	664	+1.68%
2012	634	−0.92%
2017	626	−0.25%
2023	663	+0.96%
Source: INSEE

== See also ==
- Communes of the Aveyron department
