= Sylvanès =

Commune in Occitanie, France

- Commune
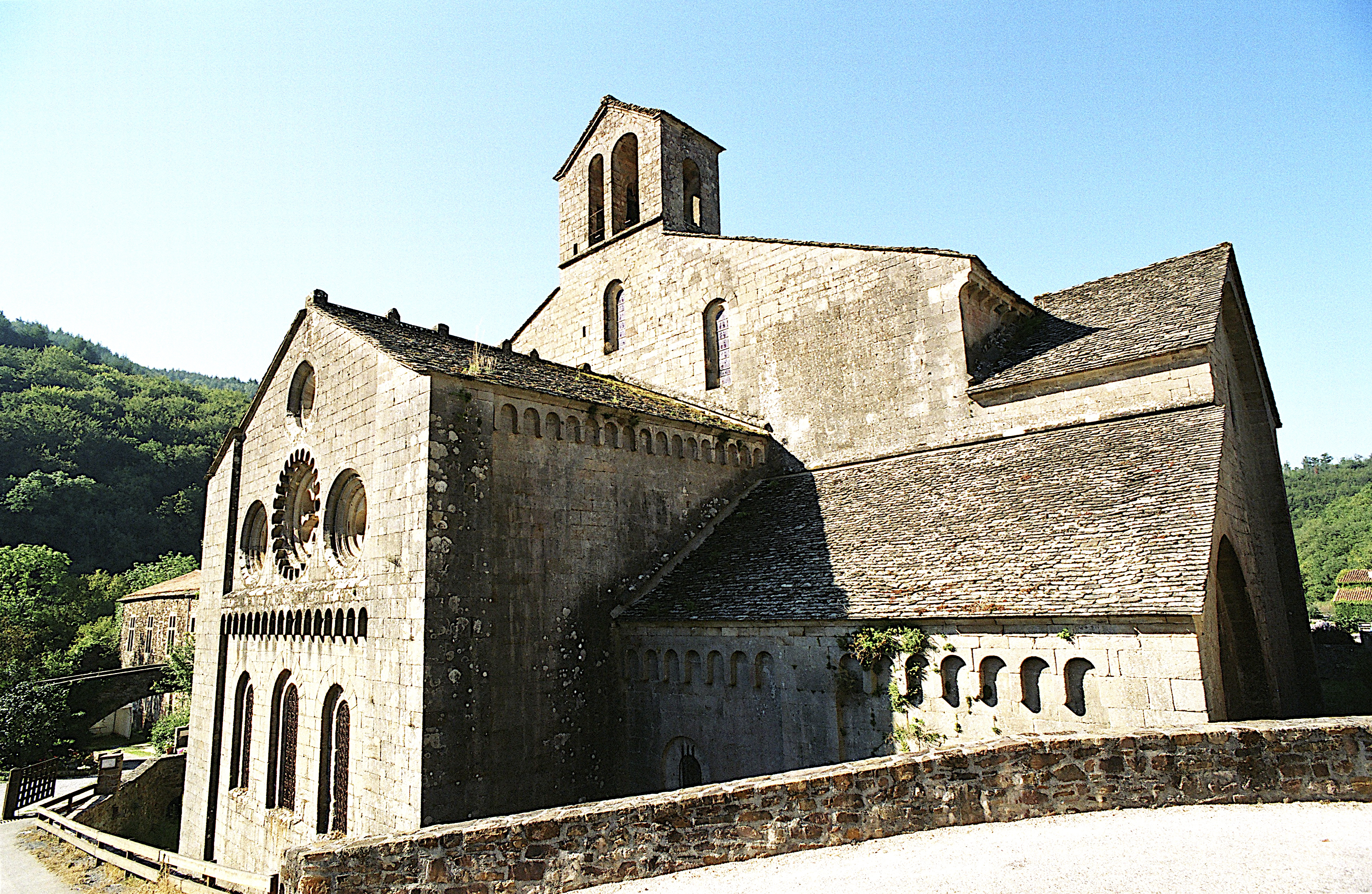
- Abbey church
- Location of Sylvanès
- Location within France Location within Occitanie
- Coordinates: 43°50′03″N 2°57′33″E
- Country: France
- Region: Occitania
- Department: Aveyron
- Arrondissement: Millau
- Canton: Causses-Rougiers

Government
  - Mayor (2020–2026): Michel Wolkowicki
- Area^{1}: 16.96 km^{2} (6.55 sq mi)
- Elevation: 432 m (1,417 ft)
- Highest elevation: 780 m (2,560 ft)
- Lowest elevation: 399 m (1,309 ft)
- Population (2023): 116
  - Density: 6.84/km^{2} (17.7/sq mi)
- Time zone: UTC+01:00 (CET)
  - Summer (DST): UTC+02:00 (CEST)
- INSEE/Postal code: 12274 /12360
- ^{1} French Land Register data, which excludes lakes, ponds, glaciers > 1 km^{2} (0.386 sq mi or 247 acres) and river estuaries.

Sylvanès (French pronunciation: [silvanɛs]; Occitan: Silvanés) is a commune in the Aveyron department in southern France.

== Geography ==
The Dourdou de Camarès forms part of the commune's southern border.

== Population ==
Historical population
Year	Pop.	±% p.a.
1968	144	—
1975	109	−3.90%
1982	117	+1.02%
1990	108	−1.00%
1999	117	+0.89%
2007	95	−2.57%
2012	105	+2.02%
2017	111	+1.12%
2023	116	+0.74%
Source: INSEE

== See also ==
- Communes of the Aveyron department
