= Route des Seigneurs du Rouergue =

Coordinates: 44°17′N 2°41′E

The Route des Seigneurs du Rouergue (Route of the Lords of Rouergue) is a tourist itinerary established in the Aveyron département of France, grouping together 21 separate sites in the former province of Rouergue. In French, most of the sites are referred to as châteaux, but not all are what would be regarded by English speakers as castles.

The owners of the sites, some privately owned, others owned by public bodies, are signatories of a charter which promises reliable opening times, a warm welcome and a wealth of information for visitors.

The 21 sites are:

Château de Belcastel; Château du Bosc; Château de Bournazel; Château de Brousse; Château de Calmont d'Olt; Château du Colombier; Château de Coupiac; Château d'Esplas; Château de Fayet; Commanderie Hospitalière de Lugan; Château de Mélac	Château de Montaigut; Château de Najac; Château de Peyrebrune; Château de Peyrelade; Château de Saint-Beauzély; Château de Saint-Izaire; Château de Sévérac; Château de Valon; Château de Vézins; Tour Hospitalière du Viala-du-Pas-de-Jaux.

== See also ==
- List of castles in France
