= Murat-sur-Vèbre =

- Commune
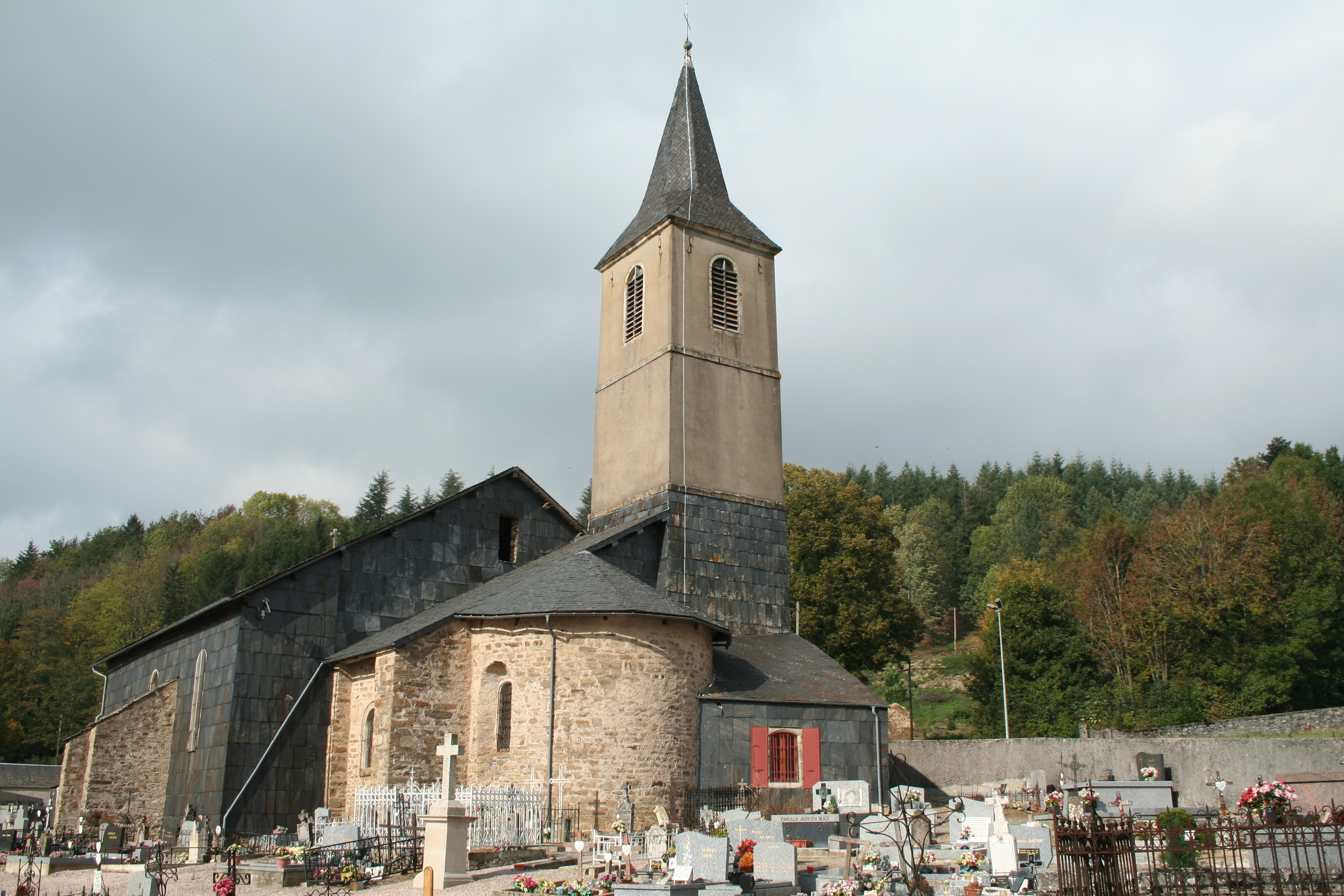
- The church in Murat-sur-Vèbre

- Coat of arms
- Location of Murat-sur-Vèbre
- Location within France Location within Occitanie
- Coordinates: 43°41′10″N 2°51′16″E
- Country: France
- Region: Occitania
- Department: Tarn
- Arrondissement: Castres
- Canton: Les Hautes Terres d'Oc
- Intercommunality: CC du Haut-Languedoc

Government
  - Mayor (2020–2026): Daniel Vidal
- Area^{1}: 98.80 km^{2} (38.15 sq mi)
- Elevation: 750 m (2,460 ft)
- Highest elevation: 1,205 m (3,953 ft)
- Lowest elevation: 543 m (1,781 ft)
- Population (2023): 831
  - Density: 8.41/km^{2} (21.8/sq mi)
- Time zone: UTC+01:00 (CET)
  - Summer (DST): UTC+02:00 (CEST)
- INSEE/Postal code: 81192 /81320
- ^{1} French Land Register data, which excludes lakes, ponds, glaciers > 1 km^{2} (0.386 sq mi or 247 acres) and river estuaries.

Murat-sur-Vèbre (French pronunciation: [myʁa syʁ vɛbʁ]; Occitan: Murat) is a commune in the Tarn department and Occitanie region of southern France.

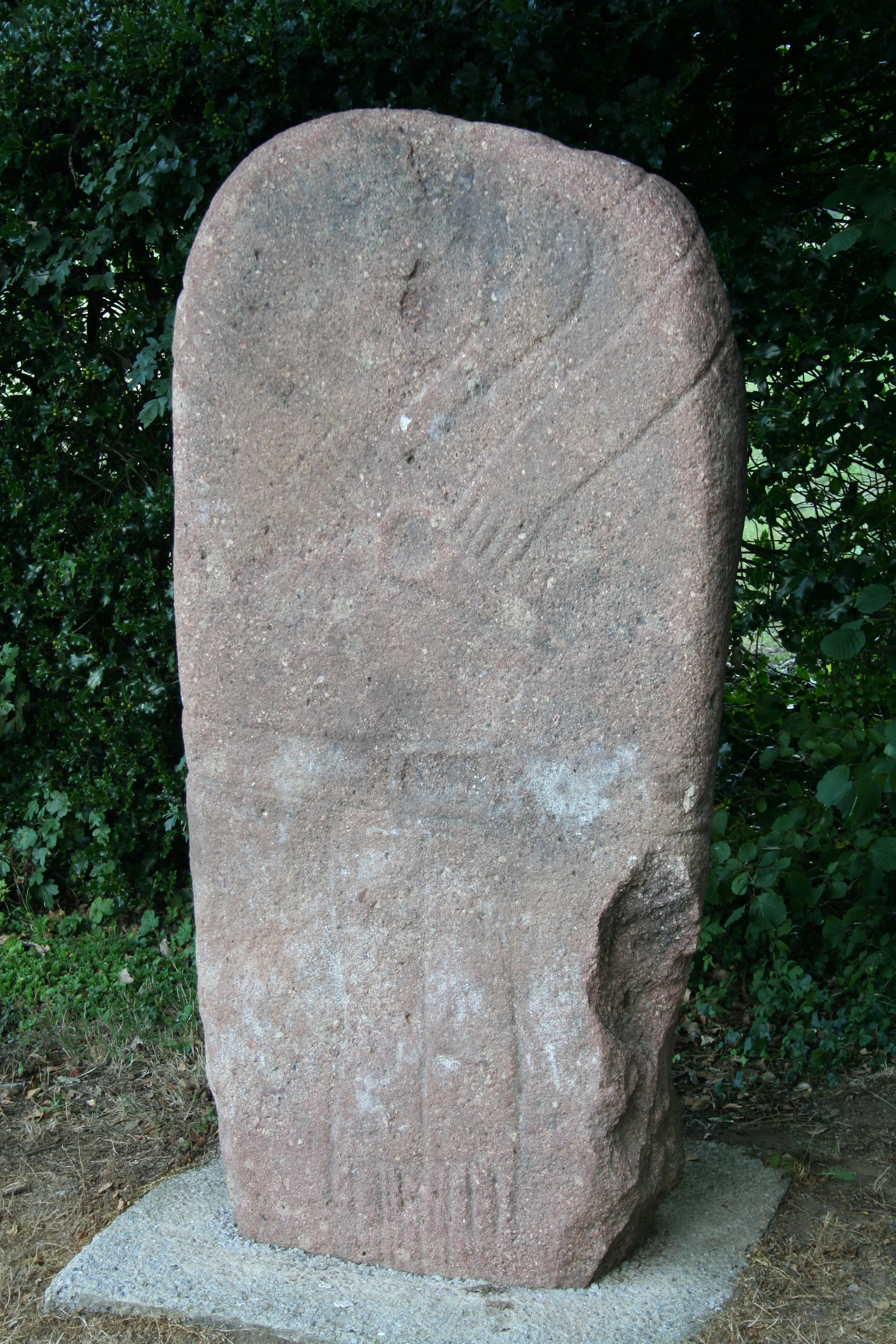
Statue menhir of Paillemalbiau

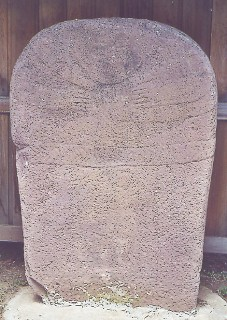
Statue menhir of Moulin de Louat

== Geography ==
The Dourdou de Camarès River has its source in the commune.

== See also ==
- Communes of the Tarn department
