= Château de Coupiac =

Castle in Occitania, France

Coordinates: 43°57′15″N 2°34′53″E

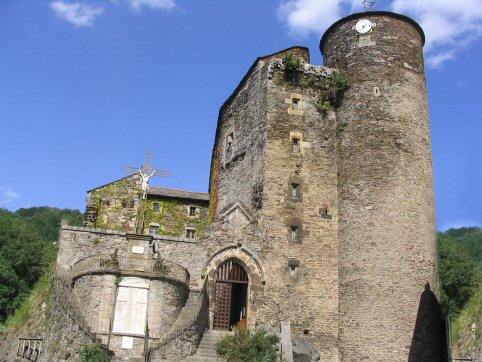
Château de Coupiac

The Château de Coupiac is a castle in the French commune of Coupiac in the département of Aveyron.

Dating from the 15th century, the castle is formed by two T-shaped wings, built directly on the bare rock, flanked by three powerful round towers. These remaining towers show architectural differences, evidence of building over an extended period. Built in the flamboyant Gothic architecture, the castle impresses in both area and height, by the number of its machicolations, its latrines and its murder holes. It includes beautiful windows and the towers and large windows on the second floor.

Since 1928, the castle has been listed as a monument historique by the French Ministry of Culture. The Château de Coupiac is one of a group of 23 castles in Aveyron which have joined to provide a tourist itinerary as La Route des Seigneurs du Rouergue. The castle is open to visitors from Easter to November.

== See also ==
- List of castles in France
- Route des Seigneurs du Rouergue
