= Château de Najac =

Castle in Aveyron, Occitania, France

Coordinates: 44°13′6″N 1°58′24″E

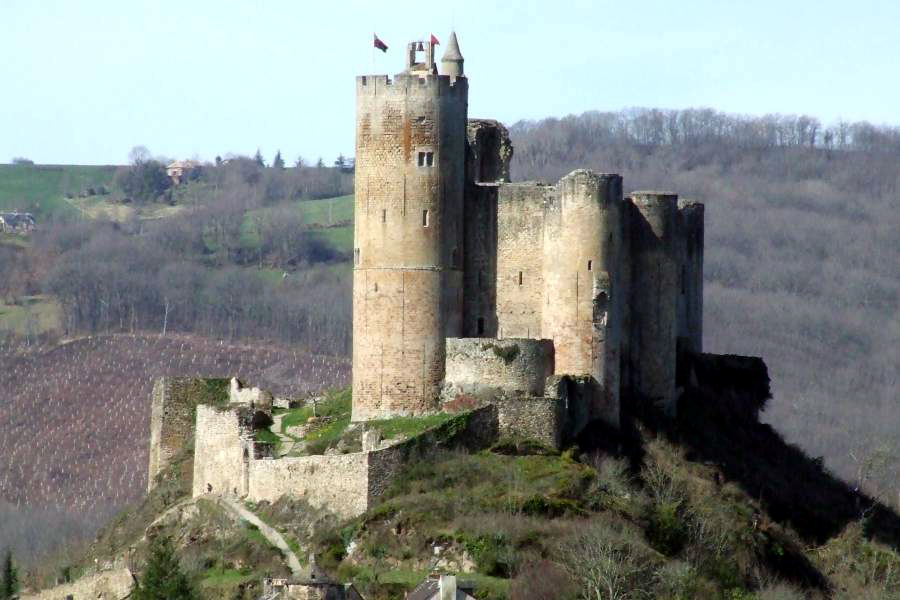
Château de Najac

Château de Najac or the royal fortress of Najac (Languedocien: Castèl de Najac) is located in Najac, in the Aveyron département, in southern France.

The castle was built in 1253 by the villagers on the orders of Alphonse de Poitiers, brother of Saint Louis, on the site of an older castle (a square tower) built in 1100 by Bertrand of St Gilles, son of Raymond IV, count of Toulouse.

== Architecture ==
The castle is built at the summit of a hill formed by a loop of the river.

The inner bailey of the castle forms a rough rectangle, with the longest side about 40 meters long. Towers project from the South and North walls, and there are towers at each corner, including an earlier square tower and a large round donjon from where the defence of the castle can be coordinated. The gate is protected by a barbican.

The castle has a world record with its 6.80-metre-high (22.3 ft) archères (a thin aperture for archers), such a size being designed to allow use by three archers at the same time. A secret corridor, hidden within the walls, links the Romanesque tower to the chapel of the keep.

Possession of this castle, built 200 meters over the river Aveyron, was key to control of the region.

== History ==
Najac has been near major events of history: the first English occupation, the Albigensian Crusade, the Hundred Years' War, the imprisonment of the Knights Templar, the peasants' revolts, and the French Revolution.

After having been used as a stone quarry in the 19th century, Najac was saved by the Cibiel family, who own it and open it to visitors. The Château de Najac is one of a group of 23 castles in Aveyron who have joined to provide a tourist itinerary as the Route des Seigneurs du Rouergue. The castle has been listed as a monument historique by the French Ministry of Culture since 1925.

== See also ==
- List of castles in France
- Route des Seigneurs du Rouergue
