= Saint-Izaire =

Commune in Occitanie, France

- Commune
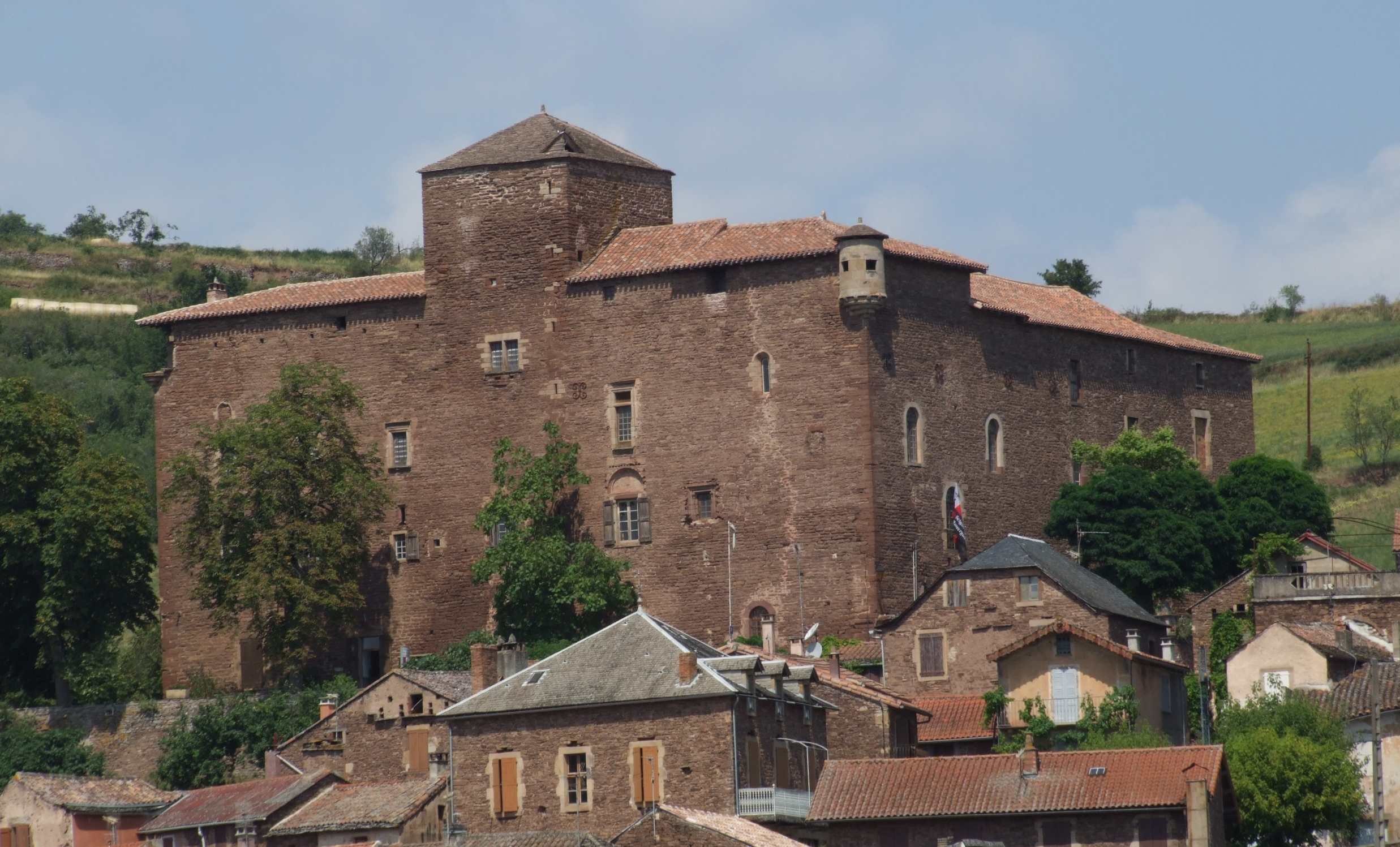
- Chateau

- Coat of arms
- Location of Saint-Izaire
- Location within France Location within Occitanie
- Coordinates: 43°58′32″N 2°43′17″E
- Country: France
- Region: Occitania
- Department: Aveyron
- Arrondissement: Millau
- Canton: Saint-Affrique

Government
  - Mayor (2020–2026): Christian Vernhet
- Area^{1}: 34.48 km^{2} (13.31 sq mi)
- Elevation: 240 m (790 ft)
- Highest elevation: 620 m (2,030 ft)
- Lowest elevation: 234 m (768 ft)
- Population (2023): 314
  - Density: 9.11/km^{2} (23.6/sq mi)
- Time zone: UTC+01:00 (CET)
  - Summer (DST): UTC+02:00 (CEST)
- INSEE/Postal code: 12228 /12480
- ^{1} French Land Register data, which excludes lakes, ponds, glaciers > 1 km^{2} (0.386 sq mi or 247 acres) and river estuaries.

Saint-Izaire (French pronunciation: [sɛ̃.t‿izɛʁ]; Languedocien: Sent Esèri) is a commune in the Aveyron department in southern France.

The Château de Saint-Izaire is a 14th-century episcopal castle.

== Geography ==
The commune is traversed by the Dourdou de Camarès River.

== Population ==
Historical population
Year	Pop.	±% p.a.
1968	495	—
1975	410	−2.66%
1982	337	−2.76%
1990	284	−2.12%
1999	317	+1.23%
2007	327	+0.39%
2012	306	−1.32%
2017	303	−0.20%
2023	314	+0.60%
Source: INSEE

== See also ==
- Communes of the Aveyron department
