= Château de Peyrelade =

Ruined castle in the commune of Rivière-sur-Tarn, France

Coordinates: 44°11′43″N 3°8′52″E

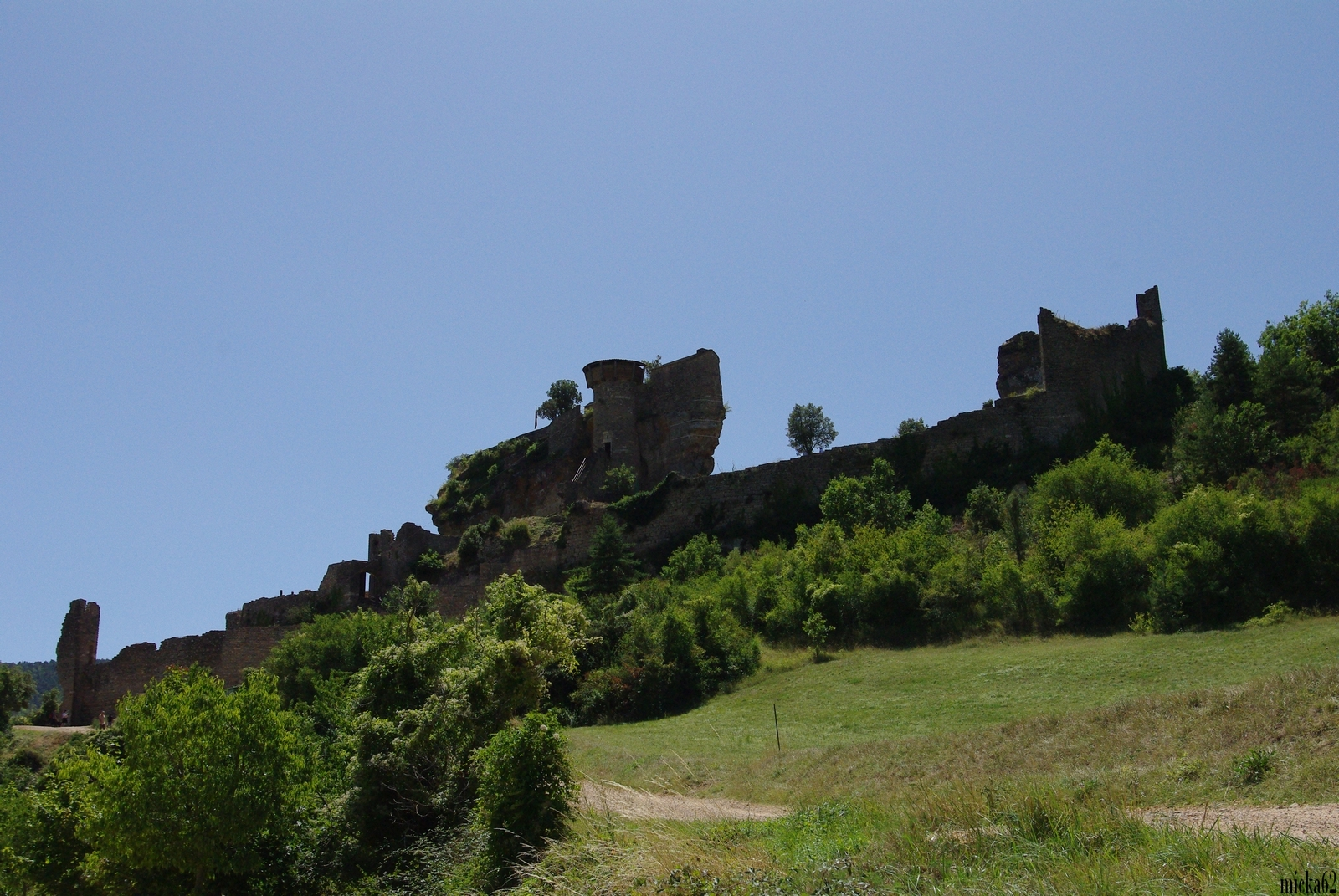
Overall view of Peyrelade Castle

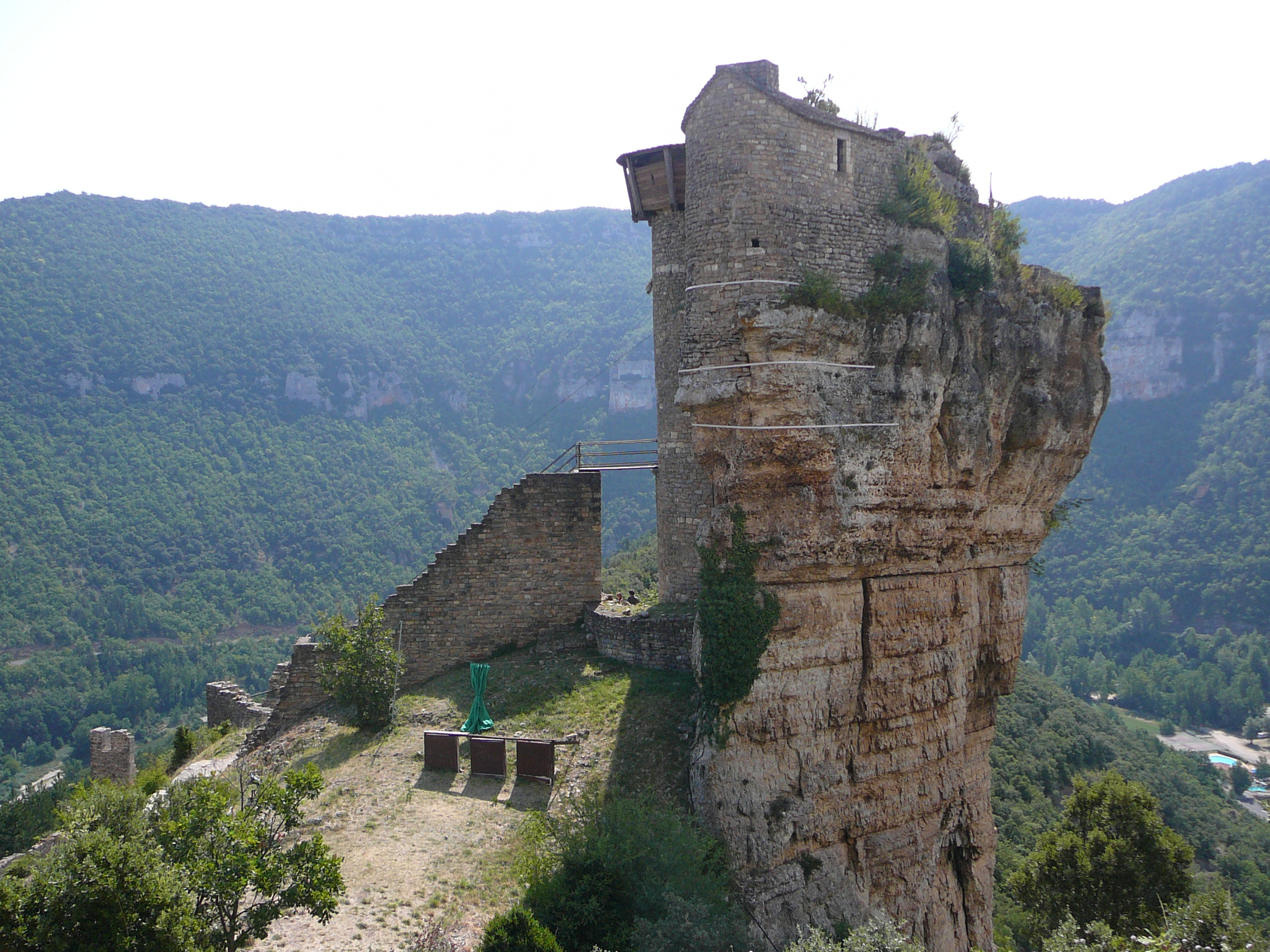
Tower of Peyrelade Castle

The Château de Peyrelade is a ruined castle in the commune of Rivière-sur-Tarn in the Aveyron département of France.

The name is derived from the occitan "pèira lada", meaning wide rock; an accurate description of the site. Objects found on the site suggest it was inhabited in prehistoric times.

Thanks to its position controlling the entrance to the gorges du Tarn, it was one of the most important castles in the Rouergue province. It existed at least as far back as the 12th century, and was the scene of incessant battles and sieges until 1633 when it was dismantled on the orders of Cardinal Richelieu.

The ruins give a good idea of the layout of the castle. The outer wall was more than 250 metres (820 ft) long, 10 metres (33 ft) high and 2.1 metres (6 ft 11 in) thick. The castle was dominated by a natural rock keep more than 50 metres (160 ft) high, accessible only from a round tower attached to it.

The Château de Peyrelade is one of a group of 23 castles in Aveyron which have joined together to provide a tourist itinerary as La Route des Seigneurs du Rouergue. Château de Peyrelade is open to visitors from mid-June to mid-September.

== See also ==
- List of castles in France
- Route des Seigneurs du Rouergue
