= Dourdou de Camarès =

River in southern France

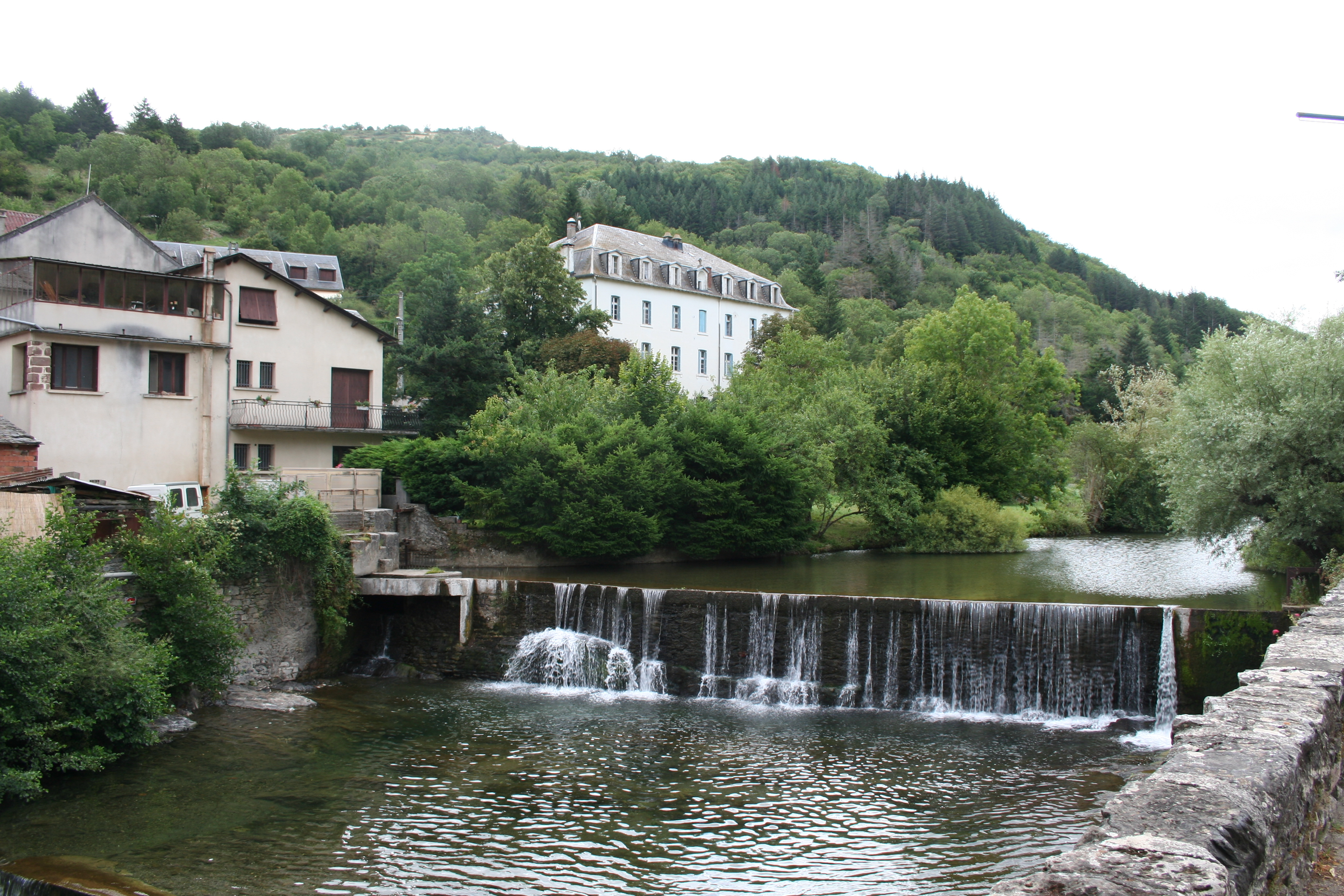
- The Dourdou at Brusque

- Location within France Location within Occitanie

Location
- Country: France
- Region: Occitanie

Physical characteristics
- Source
  - location: in Murat-sur-Vèbre
  - coordinates: 43°39′19″N 02°54′30″E
  - elevation: 1,079 m (3,540 ft)
- Mouth
  - location: Tarn
  - coordinates: 43°59′47″N 02°41′05″E
  - elevation: 245 m (804 ft)
- Length: 86.8 km (53.9 mi)
- Basin size: 658 km^{2} (254 sq mi)
- Discharge
  - average: 12.1 m^{3}/s (430 cu ft/s)

Basin features
- Progression: Tarn→ Garonne→ Gironde estuary→ Atlantic Ocean

The Dourdou de Camarès (French pronunciation: [duʁdu də kamaʁɛs], literally Dourdou of Camarès; Occitan: Dordon de Camarés) is an 86.8 km (53.9 mi) long river in the Tarn, Hérault and Aveyron departments in southern France. Its source is in the Parc naturel régional du Haut-Languedoc, in the commune of Murat-sur-Vèbre, 5.5 km (3.4 mi) southeast of the village. It flows generally northwest. It is a left tributary of the Tarn into which it flows at Broquiès, 1.2 km (0.75 mi) southwest of the village.

Its main tributary is the Sorgues.

== Departments and communes along its course ==
The following list is ordered from source to mouth :

- Tarn: Murat-sur-Vèbre
- Hérault: Castanet-le-Haut
- Aveyron: Arnac-sur-Dourdou, Brusque, Fayet, Sylvanès, Camarès, Montlaur, Vabres-l'Abbaye, Saint-Affrique, Calmels-et-le-Viala, Saint-Izaire, Broquiès
