= Vézins-de-Lévézou =

Commune in Occitanie, France

- Commune
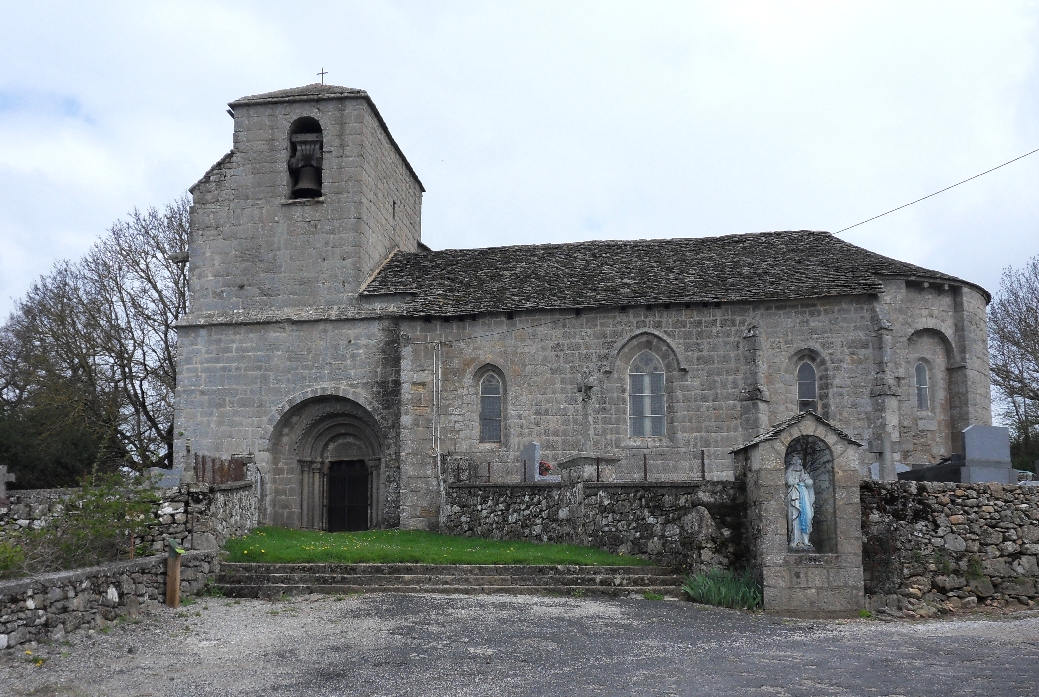
- The church in Vézins-de-Lévézou

- Coat of arms
- Location of Vézins-de-Lévézou
- Location within France Location within Occitanie
- Coordinates: 44°16′48″N 2°57′12″E
- Country: France
- Region: Occitania
- Department: Aveyron
- Arrondissement: Millau
- Canton: Raspes et Lévezou
- Intercommunality: Lévézou Pareloup

Government
  - Mayor (2020–2026): Daniel Ayrinhac
- Area^{1}: 78.96 km^{2} (30.49 sq mi)
- Elevation: 900 m (3,000 ft)
- Highest elevation: 1,155 m (3,789 ft)
- Lowest elevation: 713 m (2,339 ft)
- Population (2023): 656
  - Density: 8.31/km^{2} (21.5/sq mi)
- Time zone: UTC+01:00 (CET)
  - Summer (DST): UTC+02:00 (CEST)
- INSEE/Postal code: 12294 /12780
- ^{1} French Land Register data, which excludes lakes, ponds, glaciers > 1 km^{2} (0.386 sq mi or 247 acres) and river estuaries.

Vézins-de-Lévézou (French pronunciation: [vezɛ̃ də levezu]; Languedocien: Vesinh) is a commune in the Aveyron department in southern France.

The Château de Vézins is an historic castle, first built in 1120 by Vésian de Vézins to command the Lévézou district. Following a disastrous fire in 1642, the only remains of this original castle are the vaulted rooms of the ground floor. The castle was redeveloped in a Renaissance style.

== Population ==
Historical population
Year	Pop.	±% p.a.
1968	1,004	—
1975	879	−1.88%
1982	809	−1.18%
1990	699	−1.81%
1999	634	−1.08%
2007	644	+0.20%
2012	654	+0.31%
2017	656	+0.06%
2023	656	+0.00%
Source: INSEE

== See also ==
- Communes of the Aveyron department
