= Château de Calmont d'Olt =

Castle in Occitania, France

Coordinates: 44°31′4″N 2°45′10″E

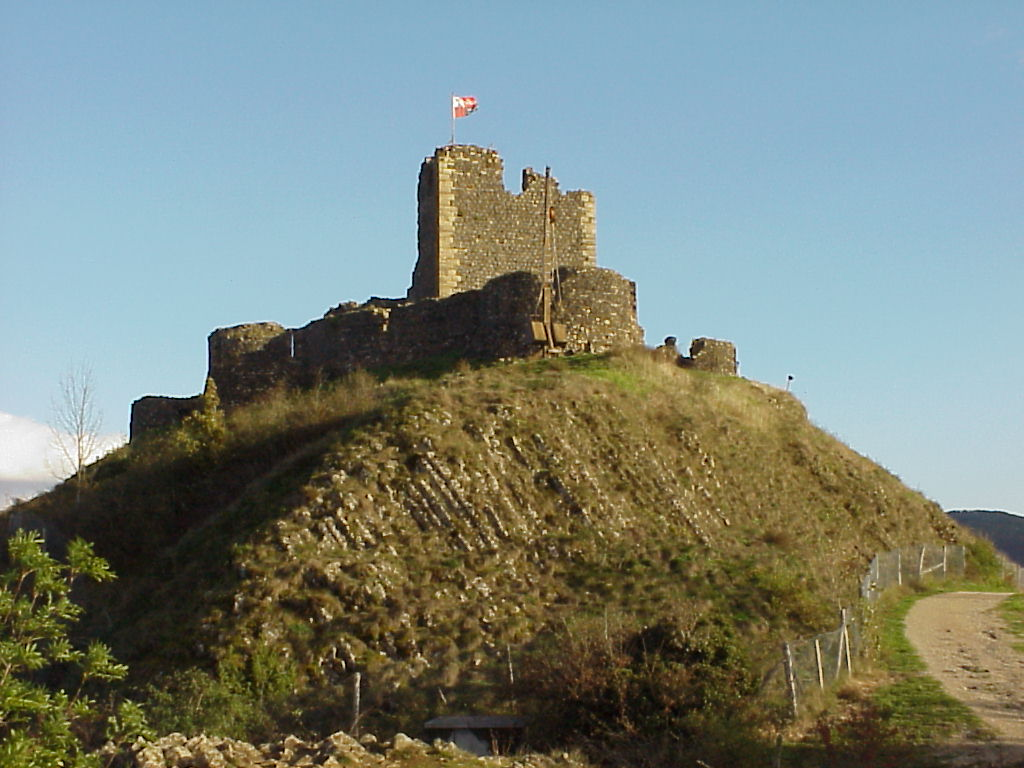
Château de Calmont d'Olt

The Château de Calmont d'Olt is a castle situated 187 metres higher than the village of d'olt, in the Aveyron département in the commune of Espalion. Perched atop a basalt dyke at an altitude of 535 m, it overlooks the town of Espalion and the valley of the Lot. It provides a panoramic view of the Aubrac highlands.

== History ==
Flint fragments and a polished stone axe are evidence of occupation at the site for more than 5,000 years. The ministerium Calvomantese was first mentioned in 883, in documents from the Abbey at Conques. It has always had a military significance, commanding the road from Rodez to Aubrac and, more widely, the crossing of the River Lot on the Toulouse-Lyon route. The building of the castle was begun in the 11th century, rebuilt and continued until the Hundred Years' War with the building of a second curtain wall with eight towers in 1400. Beyond this date, there was no further development. Abandoned by its owners in the 16th century, the castle fell into ruin. The castle, in its present state, is an important milestone in the history of castle building in medieval department of Rouergue. It bears witness to the architectural adaptations of castles to the technical progress of the Hundred Years' War.

=== Chronology ===
- For detailed chronology, see French Wikipedia.

== Today ==
Registered as a historic monument (monument historique) in 1992 by the French Ministry of Culture, in 1987 the castle was bought by Thierry Plume who gradually renovated it and had it classified in 1992. From this date, with the assistance of Bâtiments de France and the regional archaeological service and thanks to the help of volunteers working summers with the castle team, the site has little by little been reborn.

== Tourism ==
The castle is part of the Route des Seigneurs du Rouergue (Route of the Lords of Rouergue) which groups 23 castles. In 1997, it was awarded the Trophée du Tourisme culturel en Midi-Pyrénées (Trophy of cultural tourism in Midi-Pyrénées).

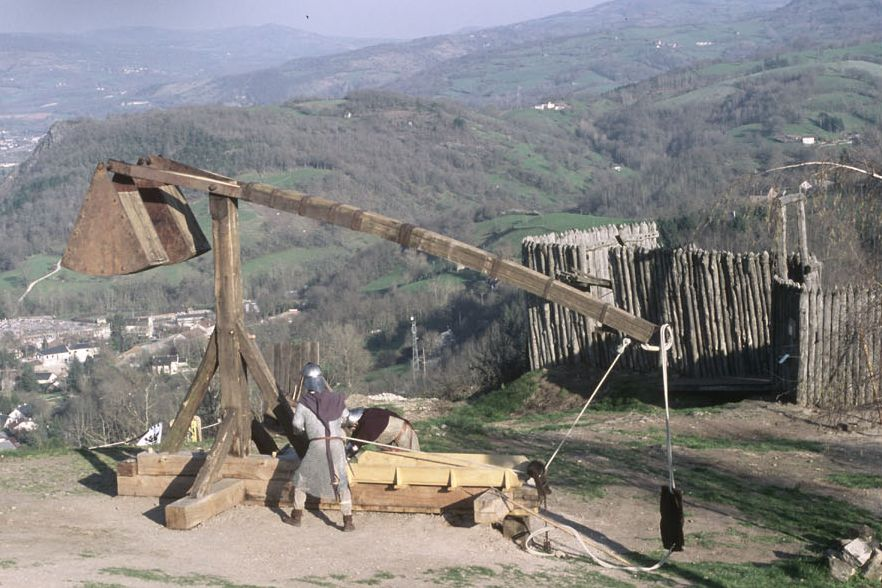
Firing the Couillard

The site highlights the theme of siege warfare. Full-scale war machines have been reconstructed and visitors may assist in the launching of projectiles with:

- siege tower from the 15th century with bombards
- couillard from the 15th century
- trébuchet from the 14th century
- pierrière from Petrus de Eboli from the 12th century
- pierrière from the siege of Toulouse from the 13th century

Visitors are also invited to take part in other demonstrations including archery, fencing and making chain mail.

== See also ==
- List of castles in France
- Route des Seigneurs du Rouergue
