= Gissac =

Commune in Occitanie, France

- Commune
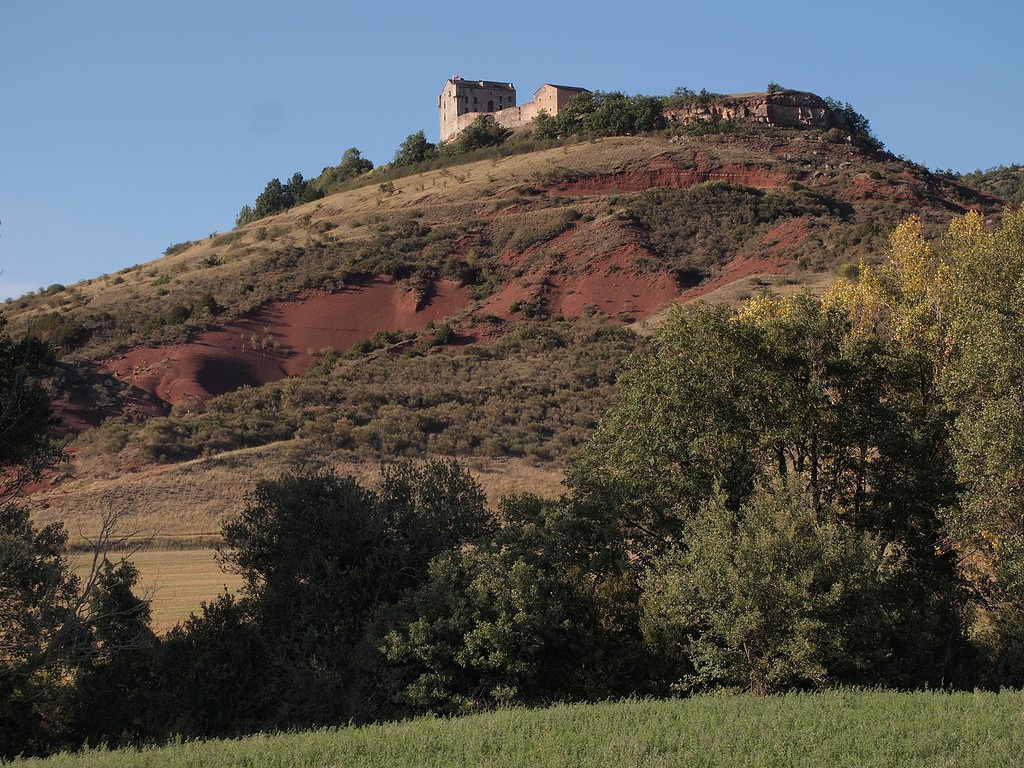
- Château de Montaigut
- Location of Gissac
- Location within France Location within Occitanie
- Coordinates: 43°50′50″N 2°55′57″E
- Country: France
- Region: Occitania
- Department: Aveyron
- Arrondissement: Millau
- Canton: Causses-Rougiers

Government
  - Mayor (2023–2026): Julien Manibal
- Area^{1}: 31.02 km^{2} (11.98 sq mi)
- Elevation: 550 m (1,800 ft)
- Highest elevation: 769 m (2,523 ft)
- Lowest elevation: 351 m (1,152 ft)
- Population (2023): 98
  - Density: 3.2/km^{2} (8.2/sq mi)
- Time zone: UTC+01:00 (CET)
  - Summer (DST): UTC+02:00 (CEST)
- INSEE/Postal code: 12109 /12360
- ^{1} French Land Register data, which excludes lakes, ponds, glaciers > 1 km^{2} (0.386 sq mi or 247 acres) and river estuaries.

Gissac (French pronunciation: [ʒisak]) is a commune in the Aveyron department in southern France.

The Château de Montaigut is a medieval castle that is open to visitors.

== Population ==
Historical population
Year	Pop.	±% p.a.
1968	146	—
1975	117	−3.11%
1982	152	+3.81%
1990	139	−1.11%
1999	97	−3.92%
2007	112	+1.81%
2012	109	−0.54%
2017	103	−1.13%
2023	98	−0.83%
Source: INSEE

== See also ==
- Communes of the Aveyron department
