= Rivière-sur-Tarn =

Commune in Occitanie, France

- Commune
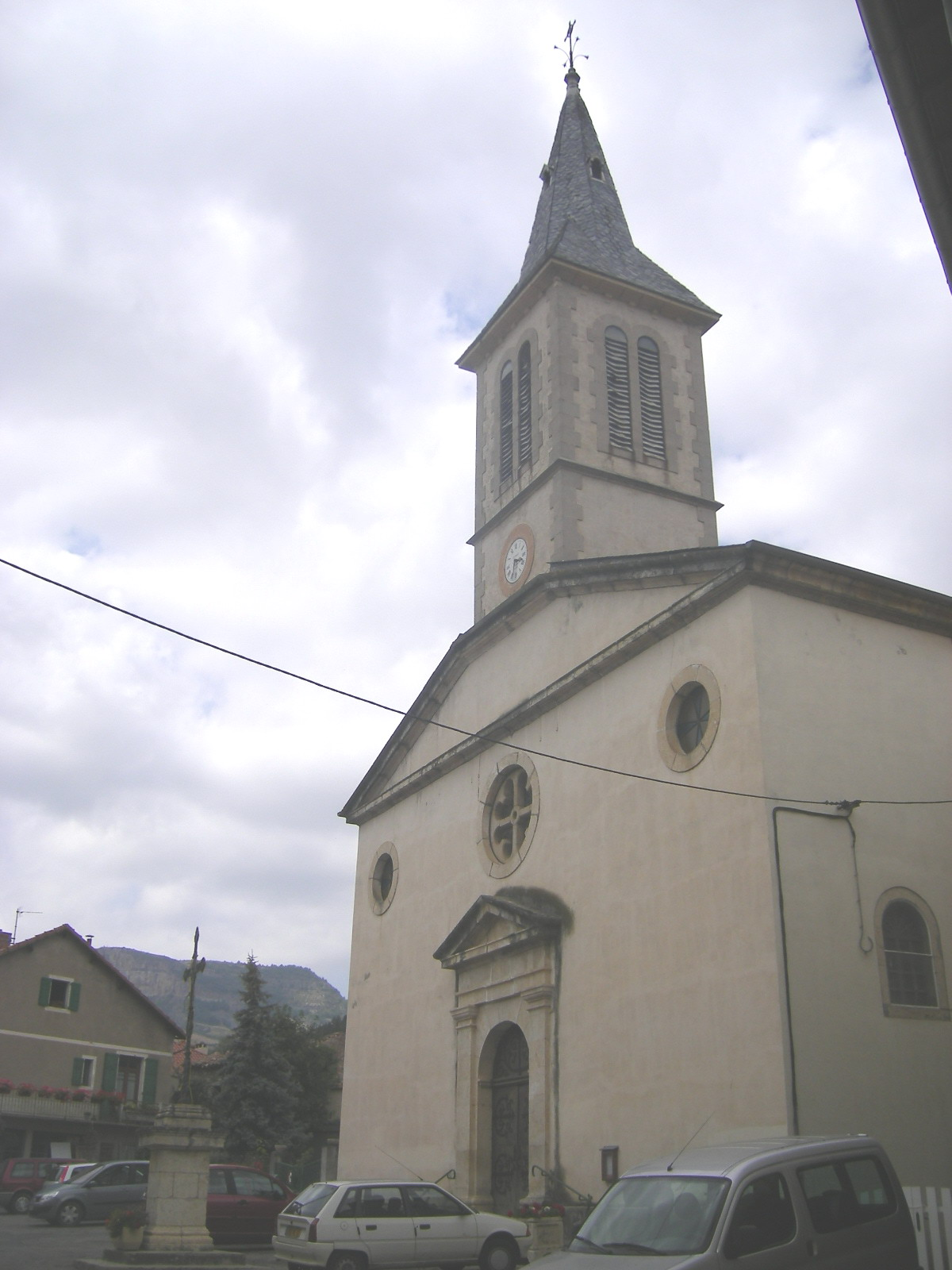
- The church in Rivière-sur-Tarn

- Coat of arms
- Location of Rivière-sur-Tarn
- Location within France Location within Occitanie
- Coordinates: 44°11′21″N 3°07′54″E
- Country: France
- Region: Occitania
- Department: Aveyron
- Arrondissement: Millau
- Canton: Tarn et Causses
- Intercommunality: Millau Grands Causses

Government
  - Mayor (2020–2026): Christian Forir
- Area^{1}: 26.08 km^{2} (10.07 sq mi)
- Elevation: 369 m (1,211 ft)
- Highest elevation: 880 m (2,890 ft)
- Lowest elevation: 372 m (1,220 ft)
- Population (2023): 1,069
  - Density: 40.99/km^{2} (106.2/sq mi)
- Time zone: UTC+01:00 (CET)
  - Summer (DST): UTC+02:00 (CEST)
- INSEE/Postal code: 12200 /12640
- ^{1} French Land Register data, which excludes lakes, ponds, glaciers > 1 km^{2} (0.386 sq mi or 247 acres) and river estuaries.

Rivière-sur-Tarn (French pronunciation: [ʁivjɛʁ syʁ taʁn]; Languedocien: Ribièira) is a commune in the Aveyron department in southern France.

The Château de Peyrelade is a ruined castle, open to visitors.

== Population ==
Historical population
Year	Pop.	±% p.a.
1968	695	—
1975	658	−0.78%
1982	744	+1.77%
1990	791	+0.77%
1999	961	+2.19%
2007	1,020	+0.75%
2012	1,052	+0.62%
2017	1,043	−0.17%
2023	1,069	+0.41%
Source: INSEE

== See also ==
- Communes of the Aveyron department
