= Château de Sévérac =

Castle in Sévérac-le-Château, Aveyron, France

Coordinates: 44°19′23″N 3°4′7″E

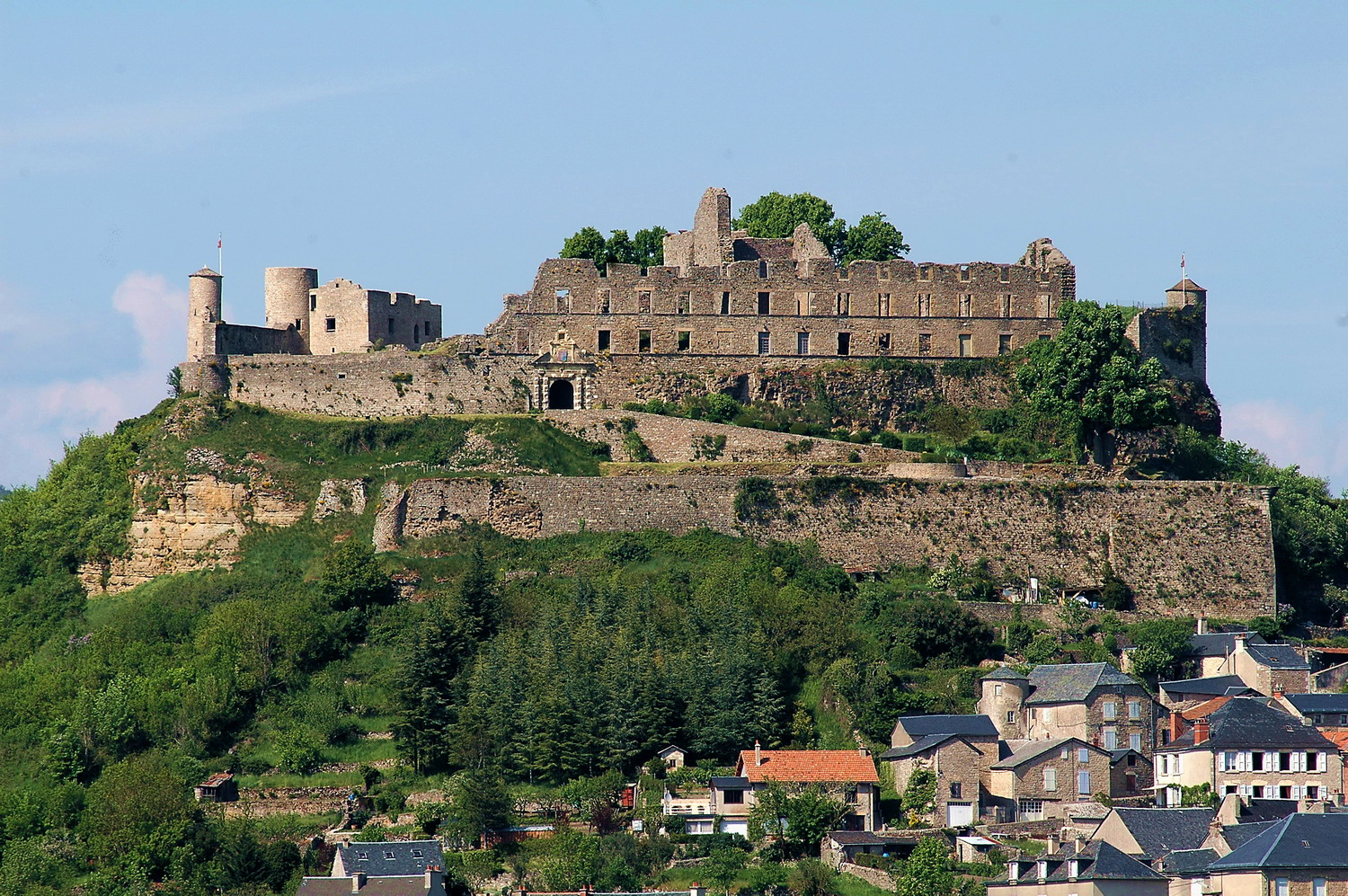
Château de Sévérac

The Château de Sévérac is a 13th- and 18th-century castle in the commune of Sévérac-le-Château in the Aveyron département of France.

The castle site has belonged to several families: the Sévéracs, Armagnacs, and Arpajons. The latter built a Renaissance style castle whose south face can still be seen.

Visitors today can see ramparts, walls, watch towers, the chapel and the kitchen, in which demonstrations of medieval cooking are given. An exhibition of medieval costumes can be seen in the chapel, and recitals of troubadour music and demonstrations of their instruments are held.

The Château de Sévérac is one of a group of 23 castles in Aveyron which have grouped together to provide a tourist itinerary as La Route des Seigneurs du Rouergue. The property of the commune, the castle is listed as a monument historique by the French Ministry of Culture.

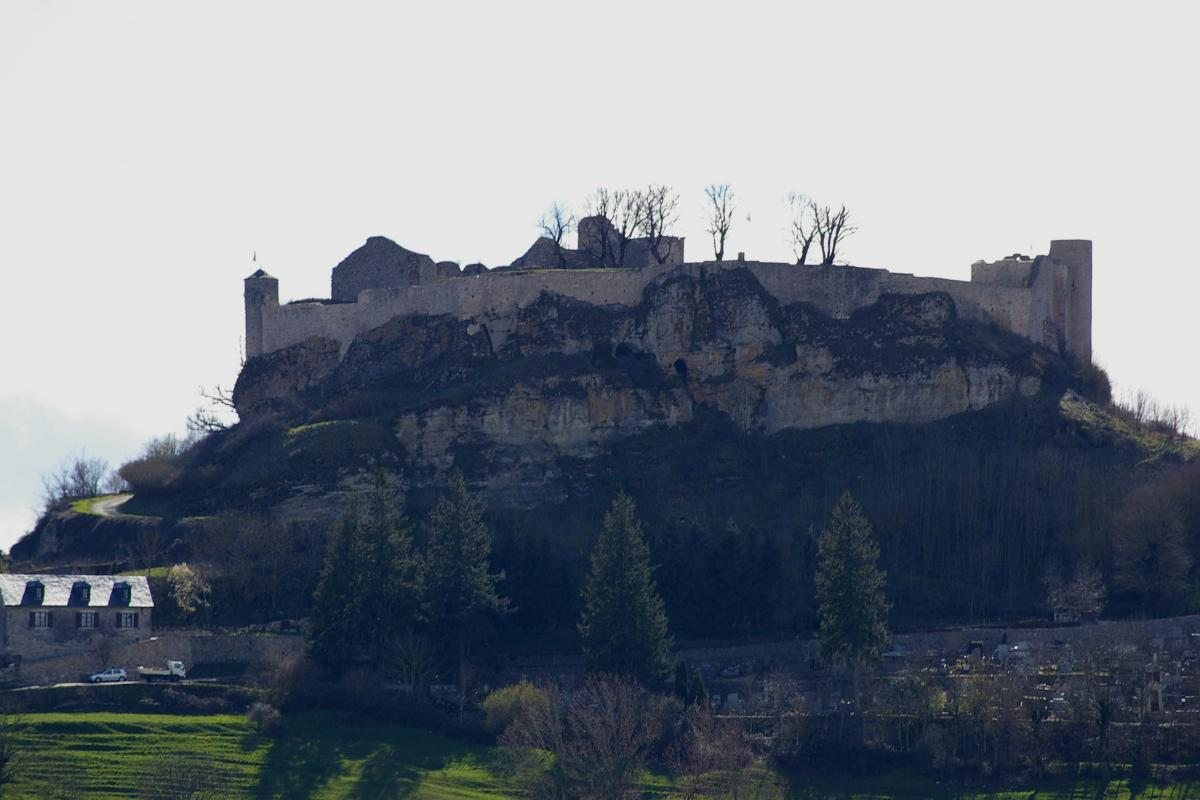

== See also ==
- List of castles in France
- Route des Seigneurs du Rouergue
