= Château de Montaigut =

Castle in the French commune of Gissac in the département of Aveyron

Coordinates: 43°53′09″N 2°52′48″E

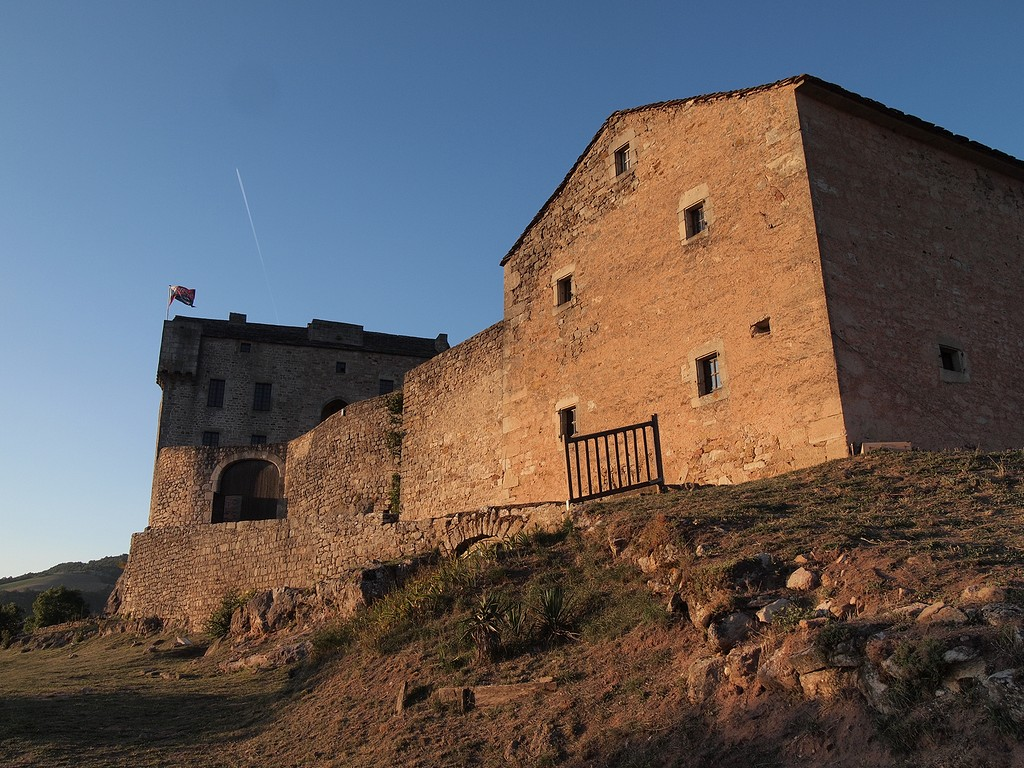

The Château de Montaigut is a castle in the French commune of Gissac in the département of Aveyron. It is a listed monument since 1987.

The first traces of the Château de Montaigut date from the 10th century. Built on a rocky outcrop dominating the valley of the Dourdou de Camarès river, it defended the town of Saint-Affrique against attacks from the south. Enlarged and transformed in the 15th century by the Blanc family, it was restored several times before falling into ruin. The association Amis du château de Montaigut, which took ownership in 1968, undertook a massive restoration. The castle was finally restored in 1989.

The castle is built on a Middle Ages necropolis.

The castle has vaulted rooms served by a spiral staircase, a cellar, a cistern carved in the rock, a guard room and prison, bedrooms and kitchens. The plasterworks are from the 17th century.

Today, the castle has become a permanent centre for cultural events. It is one of a group of 23 castles in Aveyron which have joined together to provide a tourist itinerary as the Route des Seigneurs du Rouergue.

== See also ==
- List of castles in France
- Route des Seigneurs du Rouergue
