= Najac =

Commune in Occitania, France

- Commune
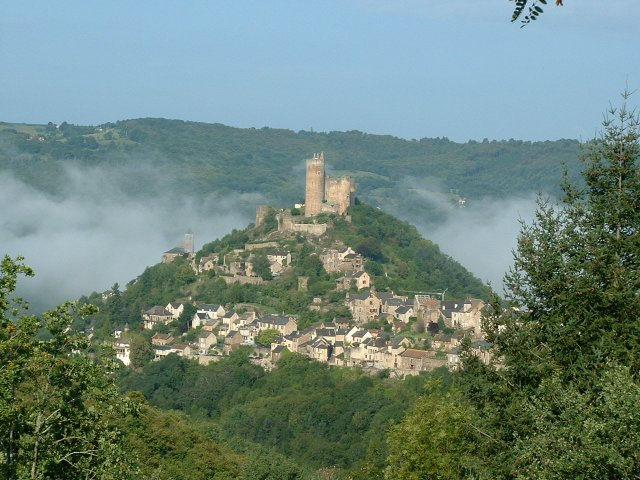
- A general view of Najac

- Coat of arms
- Location of Najac
- Location within France Location within Occitanie
- Coordinates: 44°13′11″N 1°58′43″E
- Country: France
- Region: Occitania
- Department: Aveyron
- Arrondissement: Villefranche-de-Rouergue
- Canton: Aveyron et Tarn

Government
  - Mayor (2020–2026): Gilbert Blanc
- Area^{1}: 53.88 km^{2} (20.80 sq mi)
- Elevation: 300 m (980 ft)
- Highest elevation: 500 m (1,600 ft)
- Lowest elevation: 198 m (650 ft)
- Population (2023): 771
  - Density: 14.3/km^{2} (37.1/sq mi)
- Time zone: UTC+01:00 (CET)
  - Summer (DST): UTC+02:00 (CEST)
- INSEE/Postal code: 12167 /12270
- ^{1} French Land Register data, which excludes lakes, ponds, glaciers > 1 km^{2} (0.386 sq mi or 247 acres) and river estuaries.

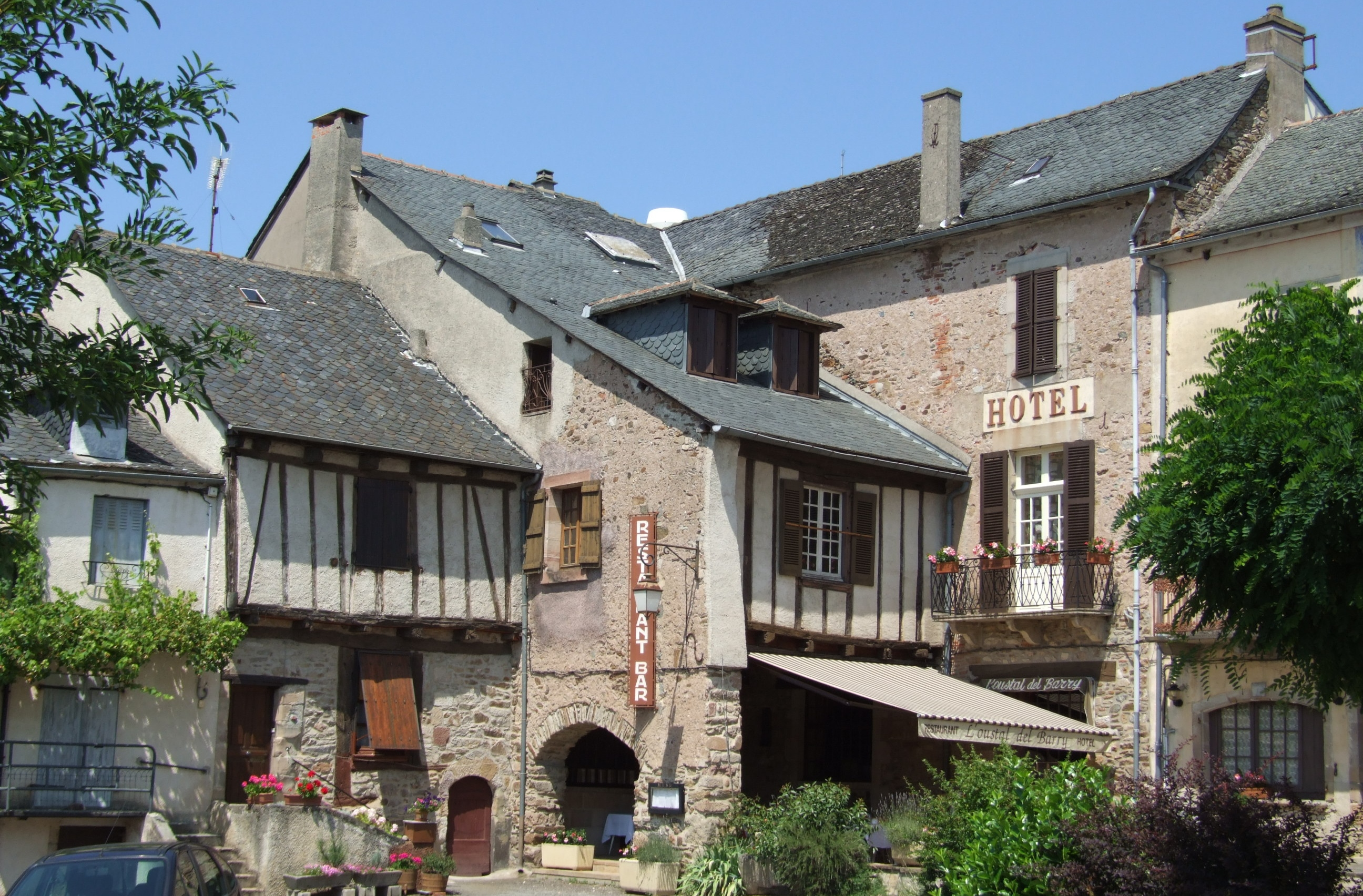
Oustal del Barry

Najac (French pronunciation: [naʒak]) is a commune in the Aveyron department in southern France. Najac station has rail connections to Toulouse, Figeac and Aurillac.

Najac village is set along a ridge above a bend in the river Aveyron. In the earlier part of the 20th century the village had around 2,000 people but it suffered marked population decline as workers migrated to towns and cities. Several films concern the village and its surrounds, for example, La Vie Comme Elle Va.

The village economy, once famous for ham, is based largely on tourism and agriculture. Most land in the commune is still used for farming and there are a significant number of long-term inhabitants. During the summer, the population increases significantly due to second home owners and holiday-makers. Most holiday home owners are British, Canadian, Dutch or from the north of France.

The village is known for historic buildings and apparent medieval character. A partly ruined château dominates; it was built by villagers in 1253 on the orders of Alphonse de Poitiers. The 13th century Eglise Saint-Jean, built by villagers as a punishment for Cathar beliefs, overlooks the lower village, while at the other end, the faubourg has the typical architecture of many bastide villages with timber-framed houses and commercial arcades around an open area.

Najac is also one of the 140 or so Plus Beaux Villages de France (most beautiful villages of France), which in addition to ensuring its tourism status, brings money to maintain the village.

== Population ==
Historical population
Year	Pop.	±% p.a.
1968	1,029	—
1975	928	−1.47%
1982	818	−1.79%
1990	766	−0.82%
1999	744	−0.32%
2007	751	+0.12%
2012	731	−0.54%
2017	698	−0.92%
2023	771	+1.67%
Source: INSEE

== See also ==
- Communes of the Aveyron department
- List of medieval bridges in France
