= Saint-Côme-d'Olt =

Commune in Occitanie, France

- Commune
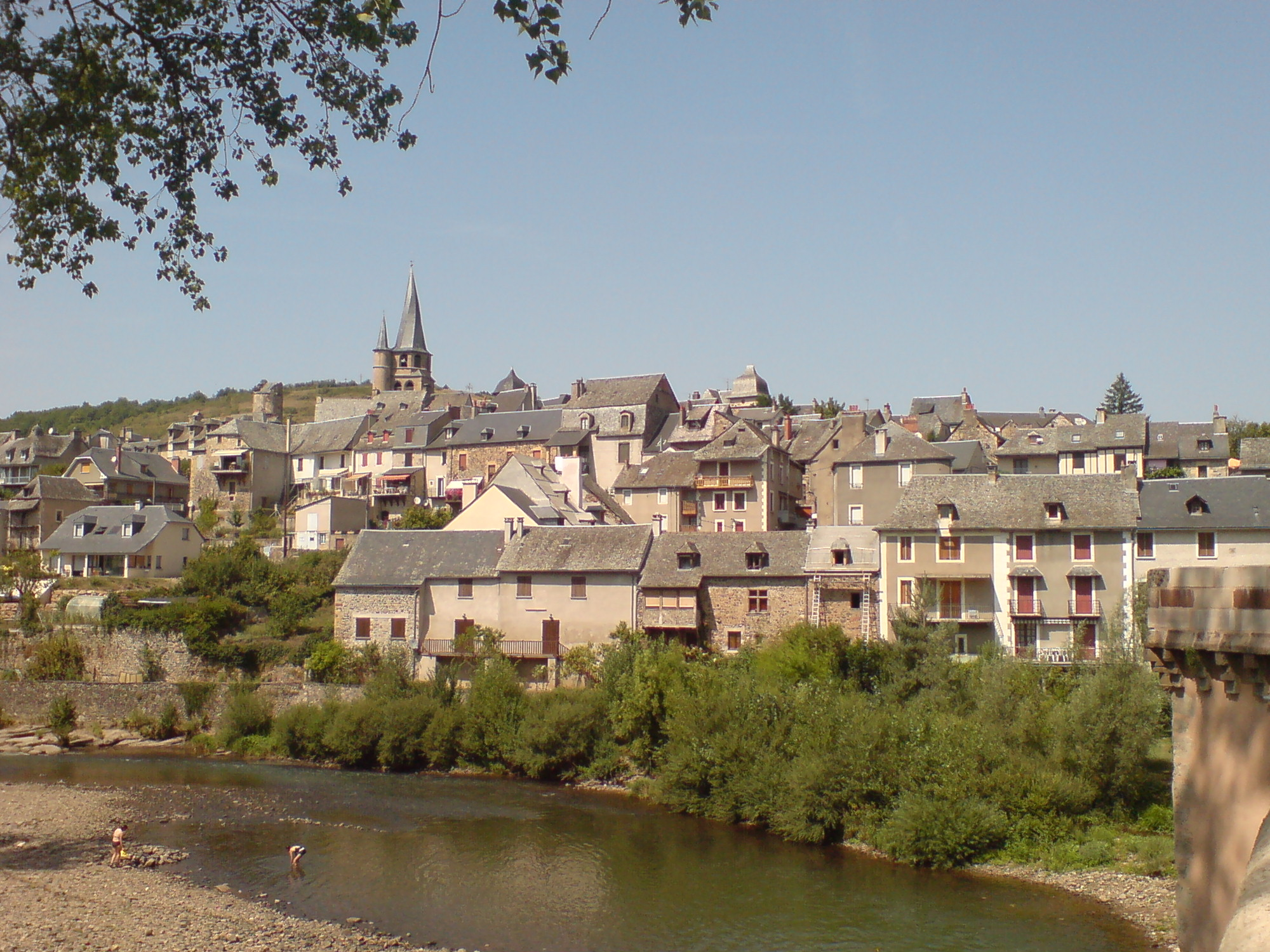
- A view of Saint-Côme-d'Olt from the bridge

- Coat of arms
- Location of Saint-Côme-d'Olt
- Location within France Location within Occitanie
- Coordinates: 44°30′59″N 2°48′55″E
- Country: France
- Region: Occitania
- Department: Aveyron
- Arrondissement: Rodez
- Canton: Lot et Palanges

Government
  - Mayor (2020–2026): Bernard Scheuer
- Area^{1}: 30.1 km^{2} (11.6 sq mi)
- Elevation: 340 m (1,120 ft)
- Highest elevation: 840 m (2,760 ft)
- Lowest elevation: 340 m (1,120 ft)
- Population (2023): 1,449
  - Density: 48.1/km^{2} (125/sq mi)
- Time zone: UTC+01:00 (CET)
  - Summer (DST): UTC+02:00 (CEST)
- INSEE/Postal code: 12216 /12500
- ^{1} French Land Register data, which excludes lakes, ponds, glaciers > 1 km^{2} (0.386 sq mi or 247 acres) and river estuaries.

Saint-Côme-d'Olt (French pronunciation: [sɛ̃ kom dɔlt], literally Saint-Côme of Olt; Occitan: Sant Cosme) is a commune in the Aveyron department in southern France. It is one of the Les Plus Beaux Villages de France (most beautiful villages of France).

== Geography ==
The commune is located in the Lot valley, near the confluence with the river called Boralde of Saint-Chély-d'Aubrac.

== Way of St. James ==
Saint-Côme-d'Olt with its twisted church spire is located on the Le Puy route (Latin: Via Podiensis, French: route du Puy) of the Way of St. James.
Pilgrims come from Saint-Chély-d'Aubrac. Their next stage is Espalion, and its church of Perse.

== Population ==
Historical population
Year	Pop.	±% p.a.
1968	1,003	—
1975	1,103	+1.37%
1982	1,207	+1.30%
1990	1,198	−0.09%
1999	1,257	+0.54%
2007	1,399	+1.35%
2012	1,320	−1.16%
2017	1,349	+0.44%
2023	1,449	+1.20%
Source: INSEE

== Administration ==
List of mayors
Term	Mayor	Party
March 2001 to March 2008	Louis Morvan	P.S
March 2008 to 2014	Nathalie Auguy-Périé	U.M.P
March 2014 to 2020 and 2020--	Bernard Scheuer	

== See also ==
- Communes of the Aveyron department
