= Vabres-l'Abbaye =

Commune in Occitanie, France

- Commune
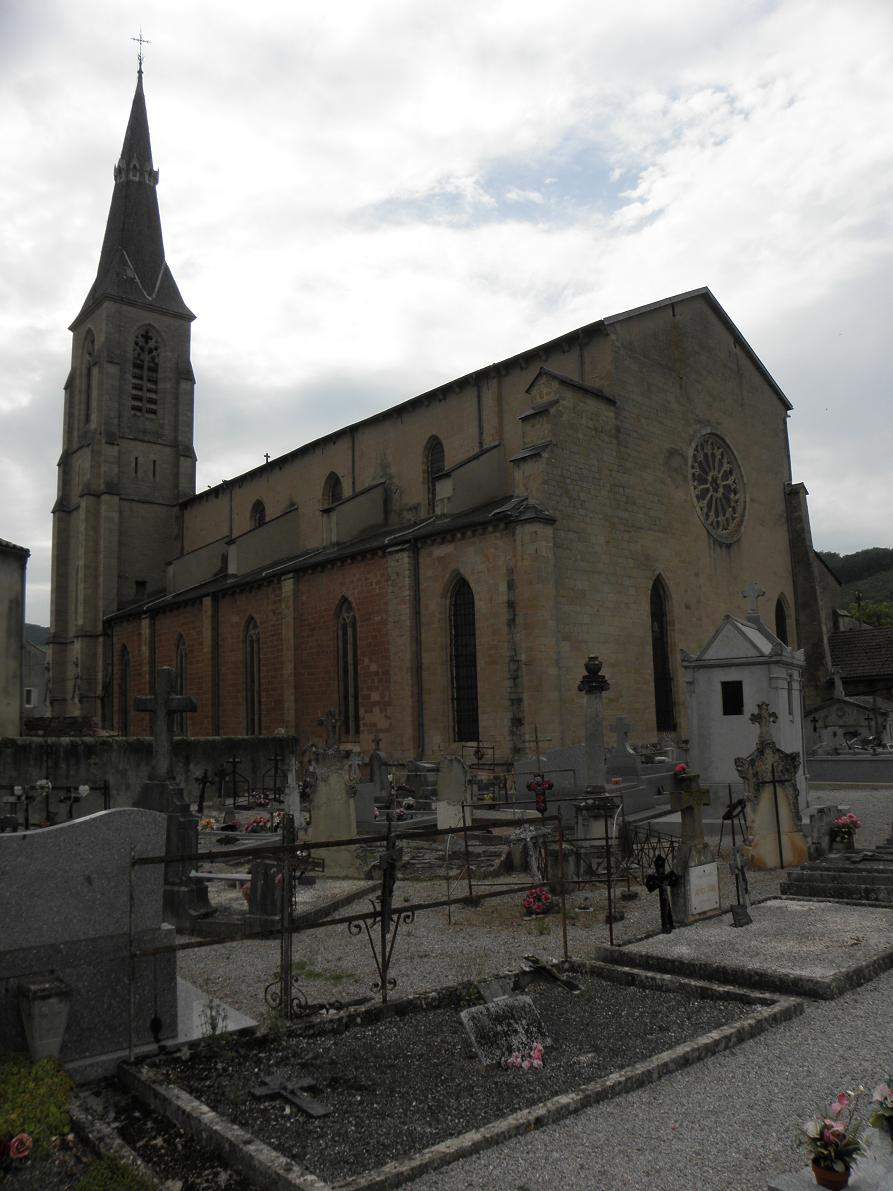
- Cathedral

- Coat of arms
- Location of Vabres-l'Abbaye
- Location within France Location within Occitanie
- Coordinates: 43°56′N 2°50′E
- Country: France
- Region: Occitania
- Department: Aveyron
- Arrondissement: Millau
- Canton: Saint-Affrique
- Intercommunality: Saint Affricain, Roquefort, Sept Vallons

Government
  - Mayor (2020–2026): Frédéric Artis
- Area^{1}: 41.36 km^{2} (15.97 sq mi)
- Elevation: 310 m (1,020 ft)
- Highest elevation: 730 m (2,400 ft)
- Lowest elevation: 299 m (981 ft)
- Population (2023): 1,205
  - Density: 29.13/km^{2} (75.46/sq mi)
- Time zone: UTC+01:00 (CET)
  - Summer (DST): UTC+02:00 (CEST)
- INSEE/Postal code: 12286 /12400
- ^{1} French Land Register data, which excludes lakes, ponds, glaciers > 1 km^{2} (0.386 sq mi or 247 acres) and river estuaries.

Vabres-l'Abbaye (French pronunciation: [vabʁ labei]; Occitan: Vabre de l'Abadiá) is a commune in the Aveyron department in southern France.

== Geography ==
The village lies in the northern part of the commune, on the right bank of the Dourdou de Camarès, which flows north through the middle of the commune and forms part of its northern border, where it is joined by the Sorgues.

== Population ==
Historical population
Year	Pop.	±% p.a.
1968	722	—
1975	732	+0.20%
1982	882	+2.70%
1990	1,111	+2.93%
1999	1,085	−0.26%
2007	1,106	+0.24%
2012	1,158	+0.92%
2017	1,200	+0.72%
2023	1,205	+0.07%
Source: INSEE

== See also ==
- Communes of the Aveyron department
- List of medieval bridges in France
