= Château de Vézins =

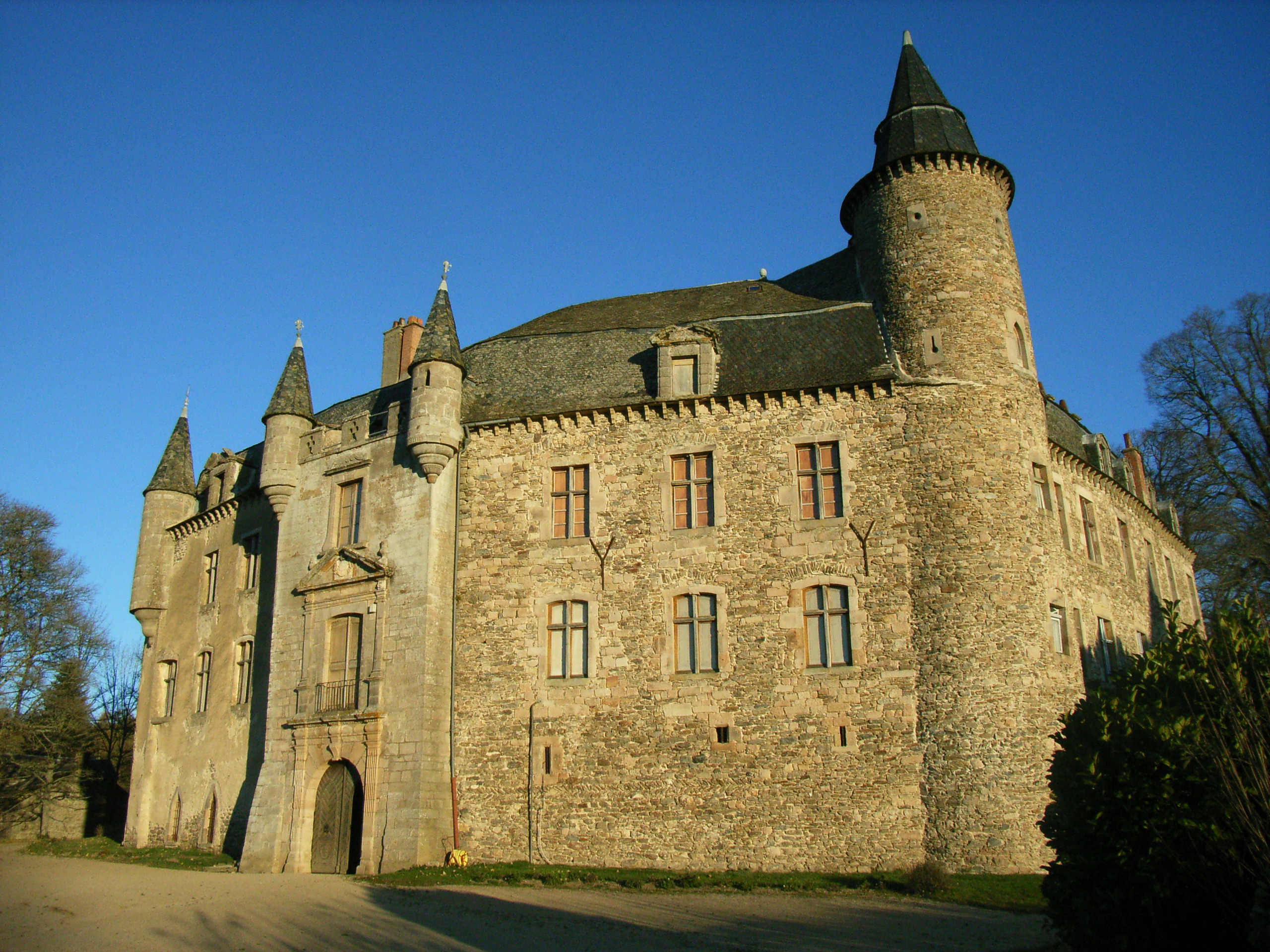

- Location within France

General information
- Status: Used as a private dwelling
- Type: Private château
- Architectural style: Middle Ages fortress, rebuilt in the Renaissance style
- Location: 12780 Vézins-de-Lévézou, Vézins-de-Lévézou, Aveyron, France
- Coordinates: 44°16′47″N 2°57′11″E
- Completed: 1120
- Owner: Vézins family
- Affiliation: Route des Seigneurs du Rouergue

Design and construction
- Awards: 2000 Prix du Patrimoine (Midi-Pyrénées region)

Monument historique
- Designated: 1 October 1990
- Reference no.: PA00094238

The Château de Vézins is a much-altered castle in the commune of Vézins-de-Lévézou between Millau and Rodez in the Aveyron département of France. It has been in the possession of the Vézins family for 900 years.

The first fortress was built in 1120 by Vesian de Vézins to command the Lévezou district. Following a disastrous fire in 1642, the only remains of this original castle are the vaulted rooms of the ground floor. The castle was then redeveloped in the Renaissance style.

Modern-day visitors to the horseshoe-shaped château can see the vaulted hall from the Middle Ages and the first floor rooms. Of particular note are the sculpted coats of arms on the chimney places, Aubusson tapestries from the 16th and 17th centuries and a canopied bed.

The château was awarded the 2000 Prix du Patrimoine 2000 (heritage prize) for the Midi-Pyrénées region. It is one of a group of 23 castles in Aveyron that have joined to provide a tourist itinerary as the Route des Seigneurs du Rouergue.

In 1990, the Château de Vézins was listed as a monument historique by the French Ministry of Culture.

== See also ==
- List of castles in France
- Route des Seigneurs du Rouergue
