= Brusque, Aveyron =

Commune in Occitanie, France

Brusque
- Commune
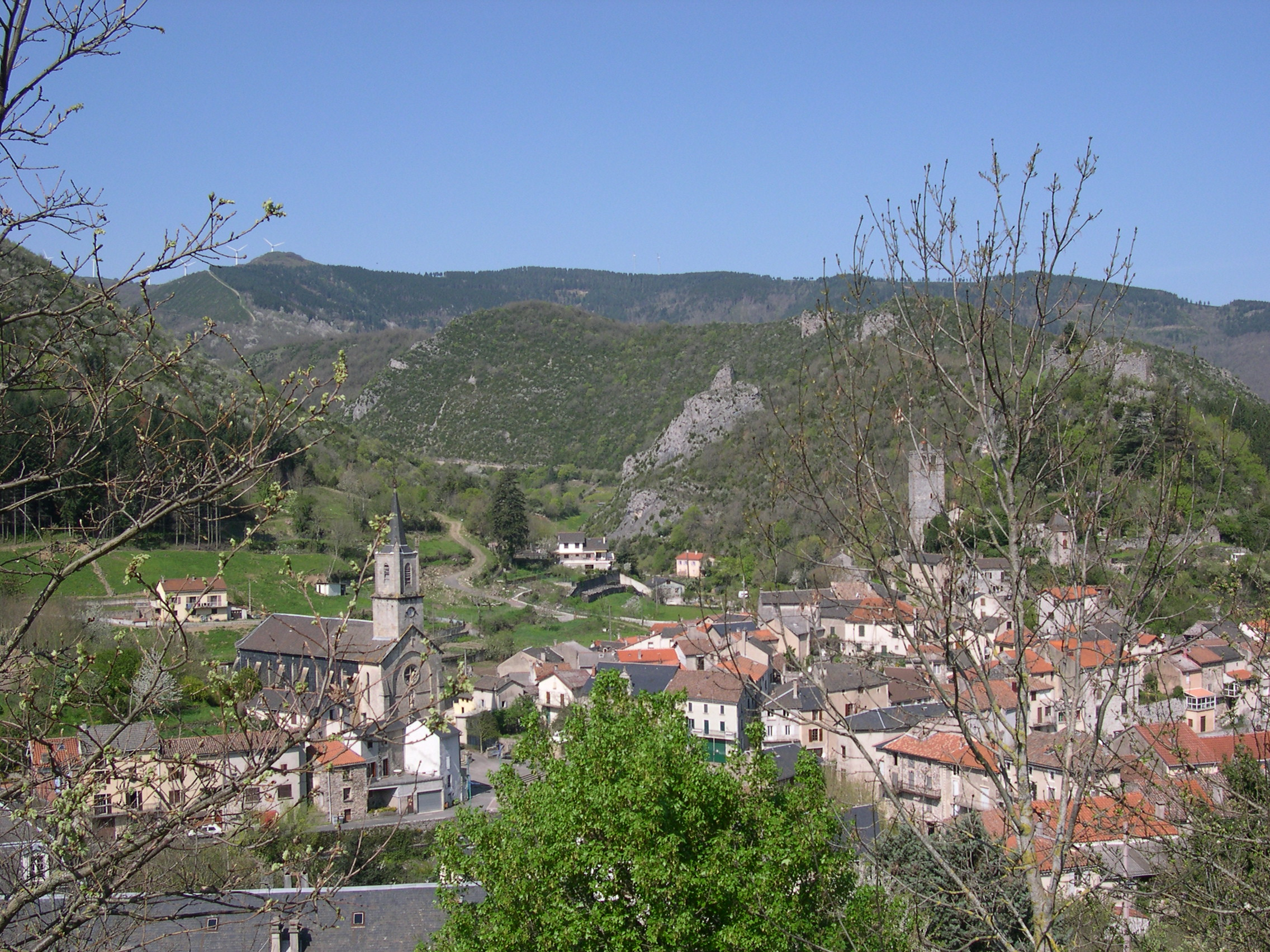
- A general view of Brusque

- Coat of arms
- Location of Brusque
- Location within France Location within Occitanie
- Coordinates: 43°46′10″N 2°57′02″E
- Country: France
- Region: Occitania
- Department: Aveyron
- Arrondissement: Millau
- Canton: Causses-Rougiers

Government
  - Mayor (2020–2026): Hélène Ros-Chico
- Area^{1}: 36.18 km^{2} (13.97 sq mi)
- Elevation: 452 m (1,483 ft)
- Highest elevation: 1,080 m (3,540 ft)
- Lowest elevation: 416 m (1,365 ft)
- Population (2023): 258
  - Density: 7.13/km^{2} (18.5/sq mi)
- Time zone: UTC+01:00 (CET)
  - Summer (DST): UTC+02:00 (CEST)
- INSEE/Postal code: 12039 /12360
- ^{1} French Land Register data, which excludes lakes, ponds, glaciers > 1 km^{2} (0.386 sq mi or 247 acres) and river estuaries.

Brusque (French pronunciation: [bʁysk]; Occitan: Brusca) is a commune in the Aveyron department in southern France.

== Geography ==
The commune is traversed by the Dourdou de Camarès River.

== Population ==
Historical population
Year	Pop.	±% p.a.
1968	594	—
1975	540	−1.35%
1982	527	−0.35%
1990	422	−2.74%
1999	366	−1.57%
2007	320	−1.66%
2012	297	−1.48%
2017	276	−1.46%
2023	258	−1.12%
Source: INSEE

== See also ==
- Communes of the Aveyron department
