= Espalion =

Commune in Occitanie, France

- Commune
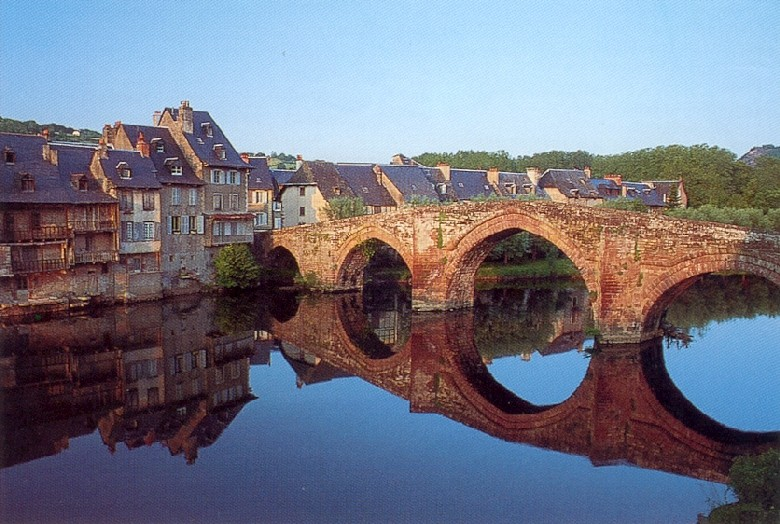
- Pont-Vieux

- Coat of arms
- Location of Espalion
- Location within France Location within Occitanie
- Coordinates: 44°31′14″N 2°45′41″E
- Country: France
- Region: Occitania
- Department: Aveyron
- Arrondissement: Rodez
- Canton: Lot et Truyère

Government
  - Mayor (2020–2026): Éric Picard
- Area^{1}: 36.60 km^{2} (14.13 sq mi)
- Highest elevation: 420 m (1,380 ft)
- Lowest elevation: 338 m (1,109 ft)
- Population (2023): 4,605
  - Density: 125.8/km^{2} (325.9/sq mi)
- Time zone: UTC+01:00 (CET)
  - Summer (DST): UTC+02:00 (CEST)
- INSEE/Postal code: 12096 /12500
- ^{1} French Land Register data, which excludes lakes, ponds, glaciers > 1 km^{2} (0.386 sq mi or 247 acres) and river estuaries.

Espalion (French pronunciation: [ɛspaljɔ̃]; Occitan: Espaliu) is a commune in the Aveyron department in southern France.

The architectural heritage of the commune includes seven buildings protected as historical monuments (France): the chapel of Perse, classified in 1862, the Old Bridge, classified in 1888, the courthouse, classified in 1911, the castle of Masse, registered in 1928, the Flaujac enclosure, registered in 1950, the former church of Saint John the Baptist, registered in 1979, and the castle of Calmont d'Olt and the chapel of Calmont d'Olt, classified in 1992.

== Population ==
Historical population
Year	Pop.	±% p.a.
1968	3,881	—
1975	4,422	+1.88%
1982	4,733	+0.98%
1990	4,614	−0.32%
1999	4,360	−0.63%
2007	4,549	+0.53%
2012	4,291	−1.16%
2017	4,516	+1.03%
2023	4,605	+0.33%
Source: INSEE

== Sights ==
- Château de Calmont d'Olt
- The Pont-Vieux (Old Bridge) is part of the World Heritage Sites of the Routes of Santiago de Compostela in France.
- Church of Perse, in Romanesque style, with some Gothic chapels added in 1471.
- Church of St. John the Baptist, built from 1472

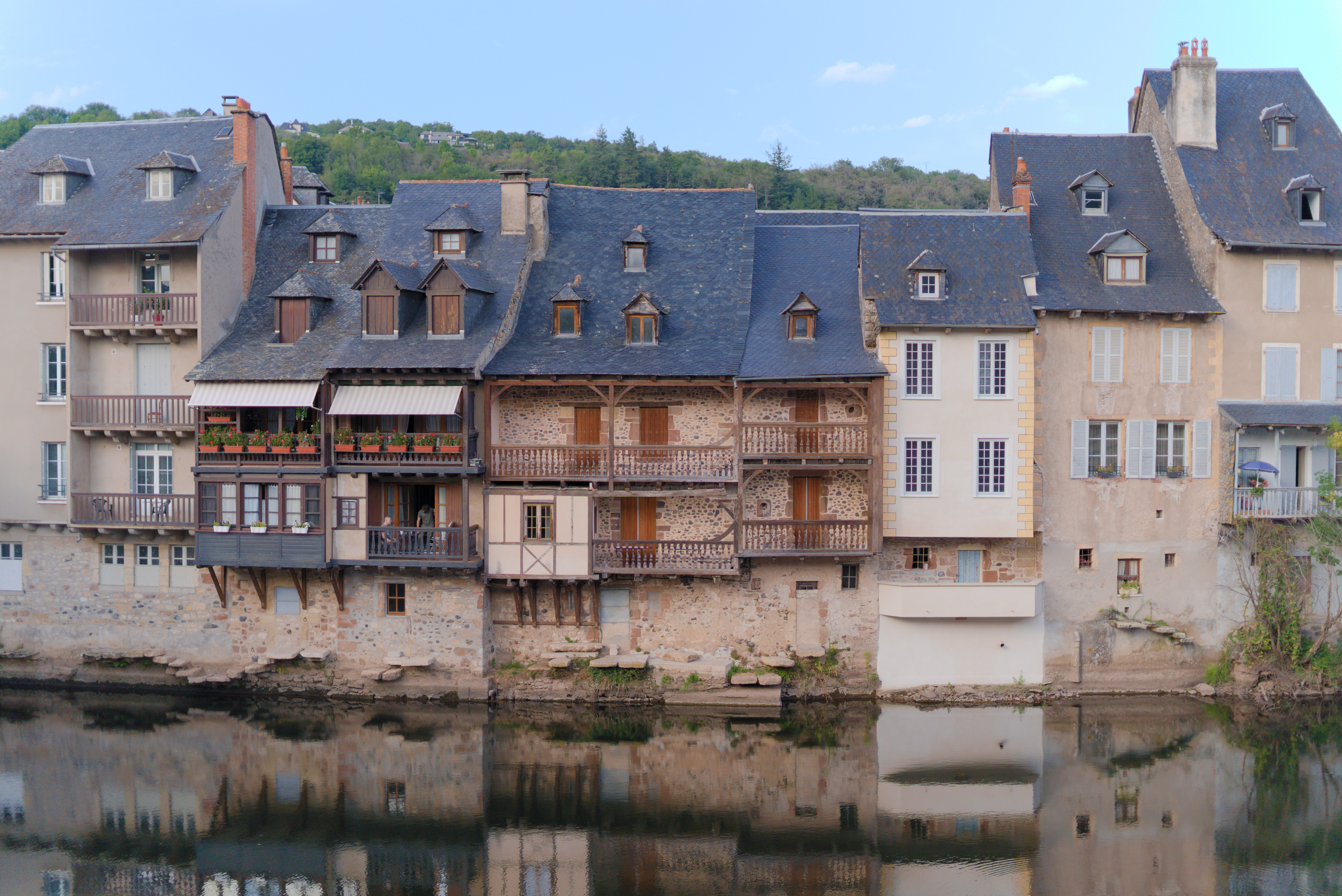
Row of houses

== International relations ==
Espalion is twinned with:

- Tauste, Spain

== See also ==
- List of medieval bridges in France
- Communes of the Aveyron department
