= Fayet, Aveyron =

Commune in Occitanie, France

Fayet
- Commune
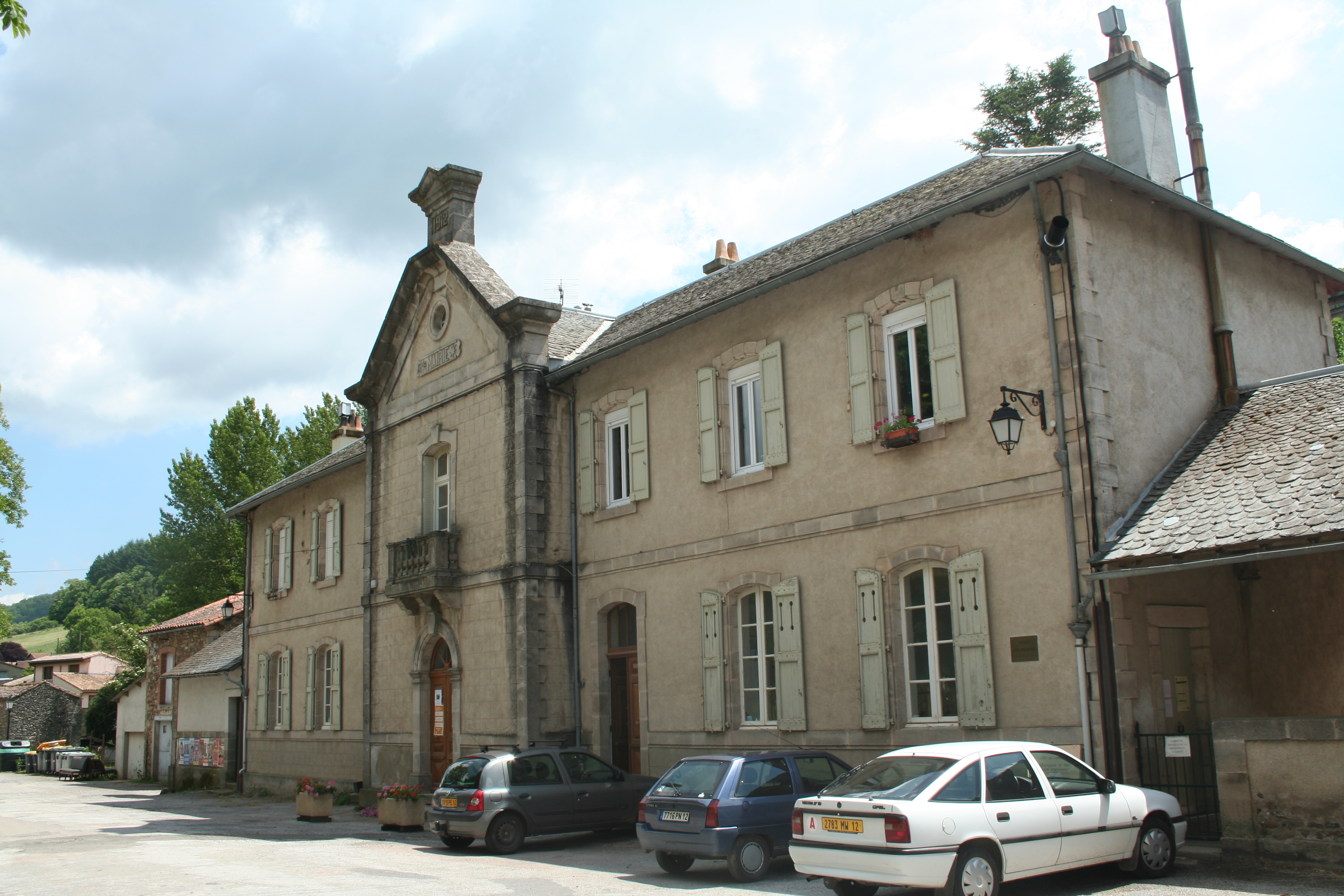
- Town hall

- Coat of arms
- Location of Fayet
- Location within France Location within Occitanie
- Coordinates: 43°48′14″N 2°56′57″E
- Country: France
- Region: Occitania
- Department: Aveyron
- Arrondissement: Millau
- Canton: Causses-Rougiers

Government
  - Mayor (2020–2026): Jean-Luc Jacquemond
- Area^{1}: 15.87 km^{2} (6.13 sq mi)
- Elevation: 450 m (1,480 ft)
- Highest elevation: 761 m (2,497 ft)
- Lowest elevation: 407 m (1,335 ft)
- Population (2023): 235
  - Density: 14.8/km^{2} (38.4/sq mi)
- Time zone: UTC+01:00 (CET)
  - Summer (DST): UTC+02:00 (CEST)
- INSEE/Postal code: 12099 /12360
- ^{1} French Land Register data, which excludes lakes, ponds, glaciers > 1 km^{2} (0.386 sq mi or 247 acres) and river estuaries.

Fayet (French pronunciation: [fajɛ]; Occitan: Faiet) is a commune in the Aveyron department in southern France.

== Geography ==
The commune is traversed by the river Dourdou de Camarès.

== Population ==
Historical population
Year	Pop.	±% p.a.
1968	408	—
1975	305	−4.07%
1982	280	−1.21%
1990	253	−1.26%
1999	271	+0.77%
2007	279	+0.36%
2012	259	−1.48%
2017	257	−0.15%
2023	235	−1.48%
Source: INSEE

== See also ==
- Communes of the Aveyron department
