= Auzits =

Commune in Occitanie, France

- Commune
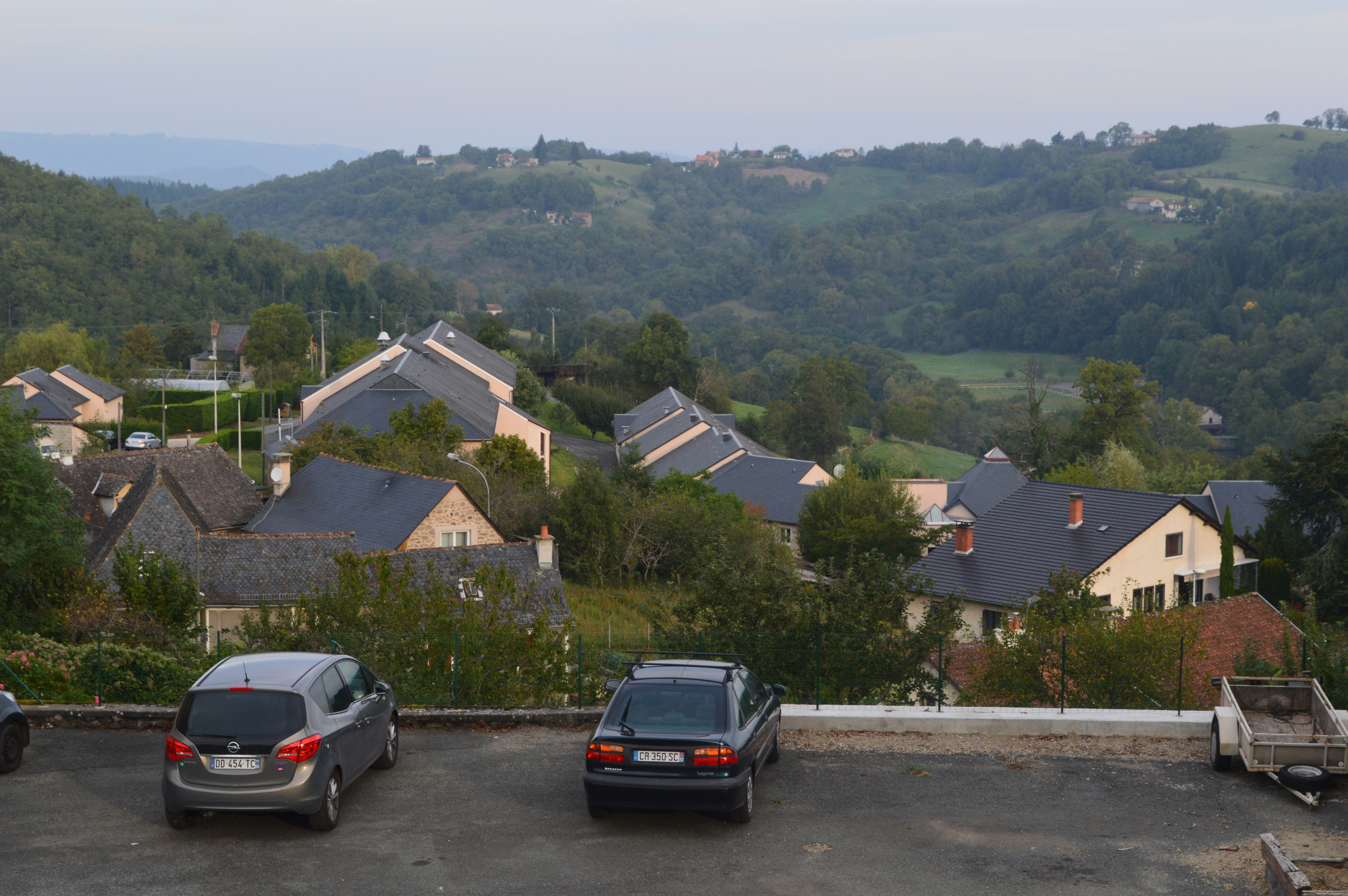
- A general view of Auzits

- Coat of arms
- Location of Auzits
- Location within France Location within Occitanie
- Coordinates: 44°30′28″N 2°19′42″E
- Country: France
- Region: Occitania
- Department: Aveyron
- Arrondissement: Rodez
- Canton: Enne et Alzou
- Intercommunality: CC Pays Rignacois

Government
  - Mayor (2020–2026): Benoît Olivié
- Area^{1}: 24.34 km^{2} (9.40 sq mi)
- Elevation: 394 m (1,293 ft)
- Highest elevation: 644 m (2,113 ft)
- Lowest elevation: 248 m (814 ft)
- Population (2023): 824
  - Density: 33.9/km^{2} (87.7/sq mi)
- Time zone: UTC+01:00 (CET)
  - Summer (DST): UTC+02:00 (CEST)
- INSEE/Postal code: 12016 /12390
- ^{1} French Land Register data, which excludes lakes, ponds, glaciers > 1 km^{2} (0.386 sq mi or 247 acres) and river estuaries.

Auzits (French pronunciation: [ozits]; Occitan: Ausits) is a commune in the Aveyron department in the Occitanie region of southern France.

== Geography ==
Auzits is located at the top of a hill with the church dominating the valley some 10 km south-east of Decazeville and 28 km north-west of Rodez. It is a large, green, and hilly commune ranging from the Plateau of Hymes to Ruhle le Haut with many vantage points especially from the highest point in the commune at Hautesserre where there is a 360 degree panorama. Access to the commune can be by many routes: the D840 from Firmi in the north passes down the eastern side of the commune and continues south-east to Saint-Christophe-Vallon; the D87 branches from the D840 in the commune and goes south-west then north to the village then west to Montbazens; the D53 from Cransac in the north passes south through the west of the commune going to Bournazel; the D189 goes south from the village towards Goutrens; the D11 comes from Cransac through the village and continues to Saint-Cristophe-Vallon; and the D631 goes north from the village to join the D840 north of the commune. A railway line passes through the commune from north to south with the Auzits-Aussibal Halt near Aussibel. Apart from the village there are the hamlets of Rulhe, Les Escabes, La Berthoumarie, Le Mas del Bosc, Aussibal, Hymes, Plateau d'Hymes, Le Coustal, and Reyrols. The commune is mixed forest and farmland.

The Riou Viou flows from the south through the village then turns west along the northern border and continues to join the Riou Mort at Viviers. The Riou Mort flows north through the east of the commune and continues north-west to join the Lot at Penchot.

== History ==
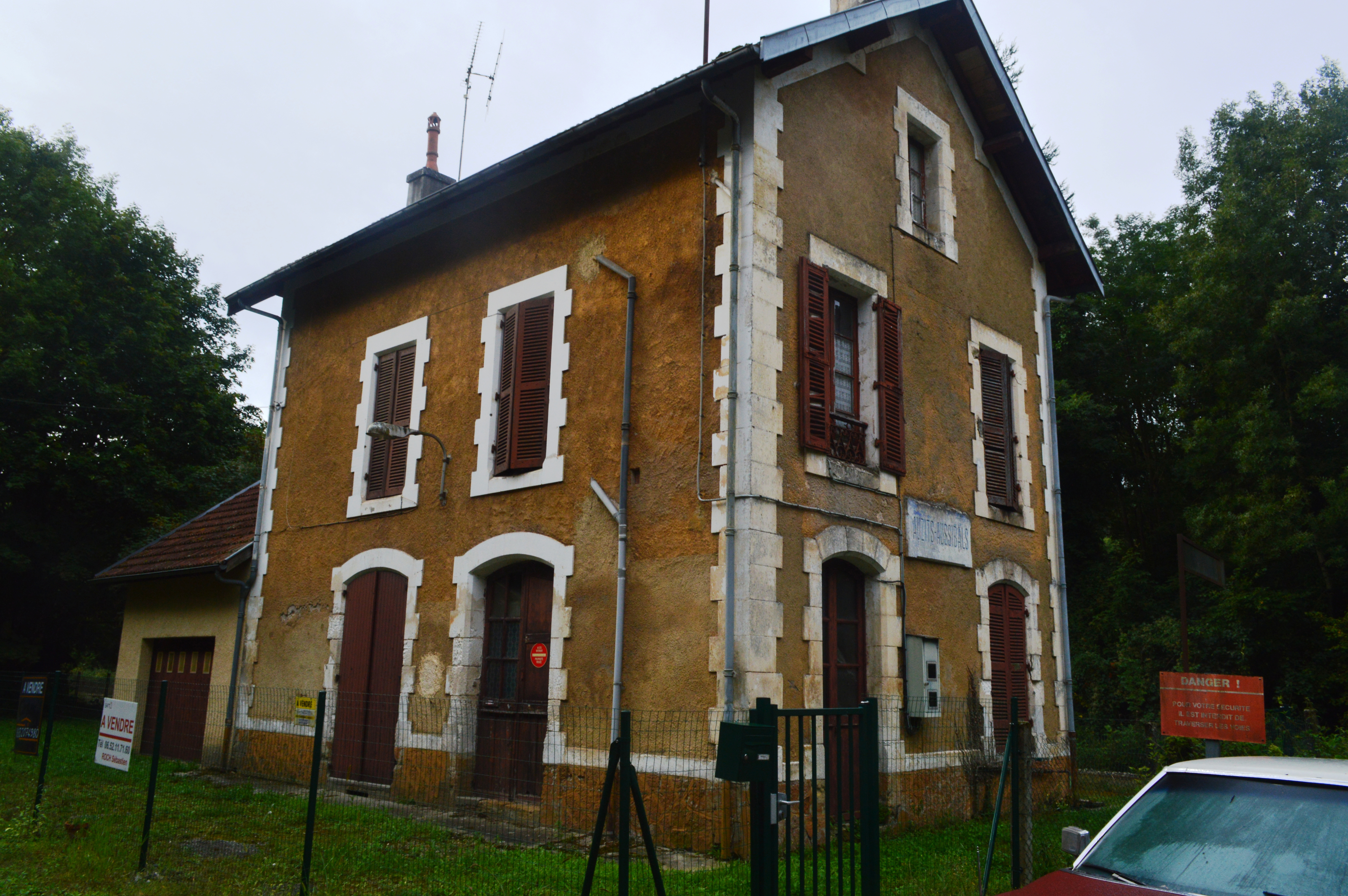
The old railway station

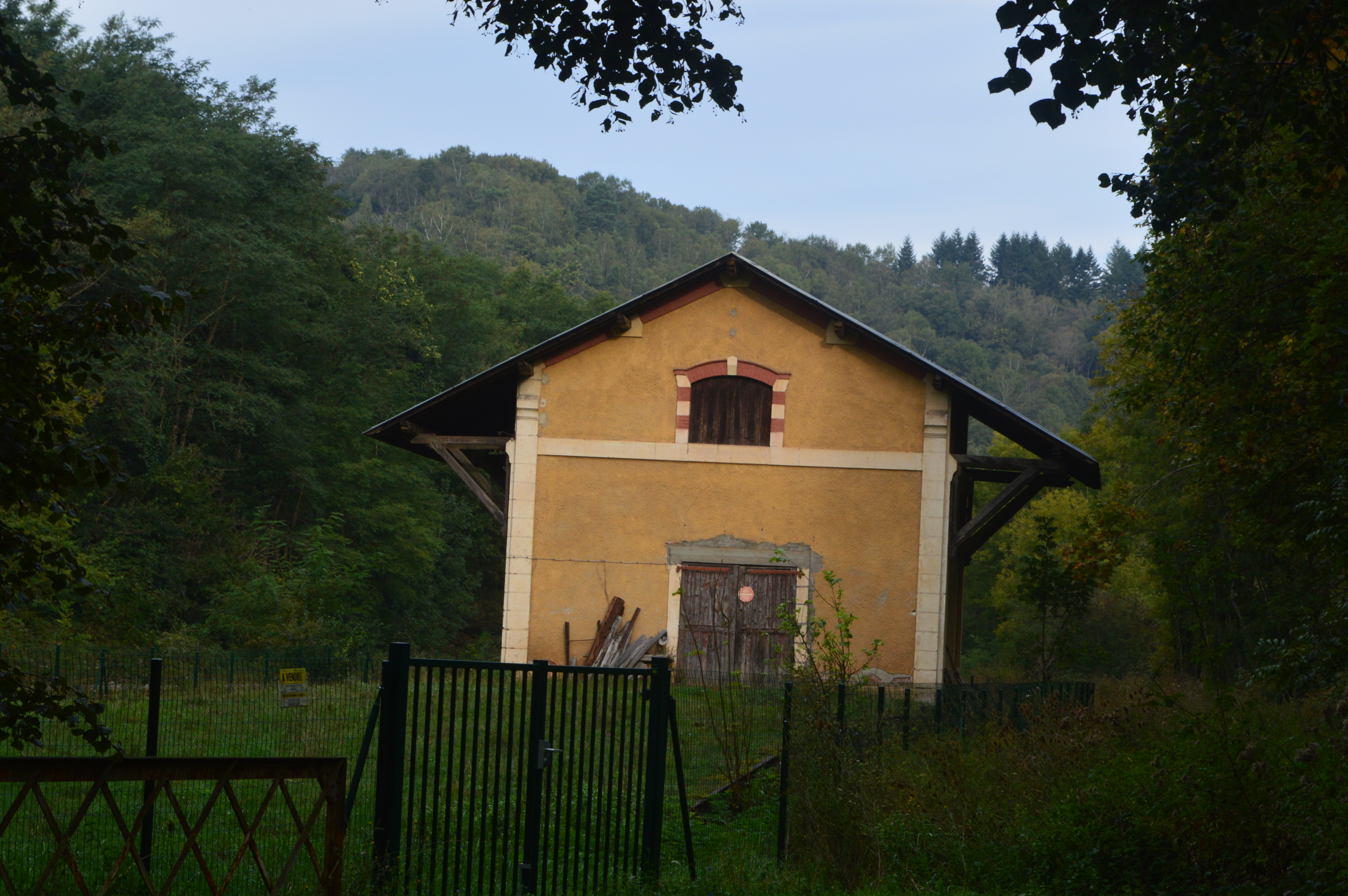
The old Goods Shed

=== Middle Ages ===
In the Middle Ages Auzits was an important step for pilgrims as it lies on the road to Saint Jacques de Compostela (the path from Conques to Villefranchois). Near the present village there was a small chapel called the Chapel of the Hospital which welcomed the sick, tired, or dying. Under the responsibility of the Knights of the Order of St. John of Jerusalem, the chapel adjoining the hospice is today still in good condition.

In 1358 the English invaded the commune and stayed for thirty years. In 1398, after the withdrawal of the British, the fortified Chateau of Auzits was abandoned. Its inhabitants did not wish for another Lord so collectively decided to build the new village church on the ruins of this castle. Perched on the rocky outcrop overlooking the valley on massive buttresses, the tower was converted into a bell tower. The stones of the second tower were reused for the central nave of the church, which is the present Church of Saint-Maurice.

=== Contemporary era ===
During the 19th and 20th centuries the commune experienced spectacular development by the coal industry. The many families who lived on coal-mining declined in number due to successive mine closures in Decazeville basin, leaving only remnants that are still visible on the Rulhe road.

== Administration ==
List of Successive Mayors

Mayors from the French Revolution to 1938

From	To	Name
1792	1796	Antoine Doumergue
1796	1801	Bernard Boyer
1803	1812	Jean Tournamire
1812	1816	Jean Christostome Garrigou
1816	1832	Jean François de Rudelle
1832	1837	Joseph Cantaloube
1837	1843	Jean Christostome Garrigou
1843	1900	Jean Pierre Bernard Agar
1900	1908	Jules Mouly
1908	1920	Jean Antoine Besses
1920	1938	Albert Pierre Louis Olivier

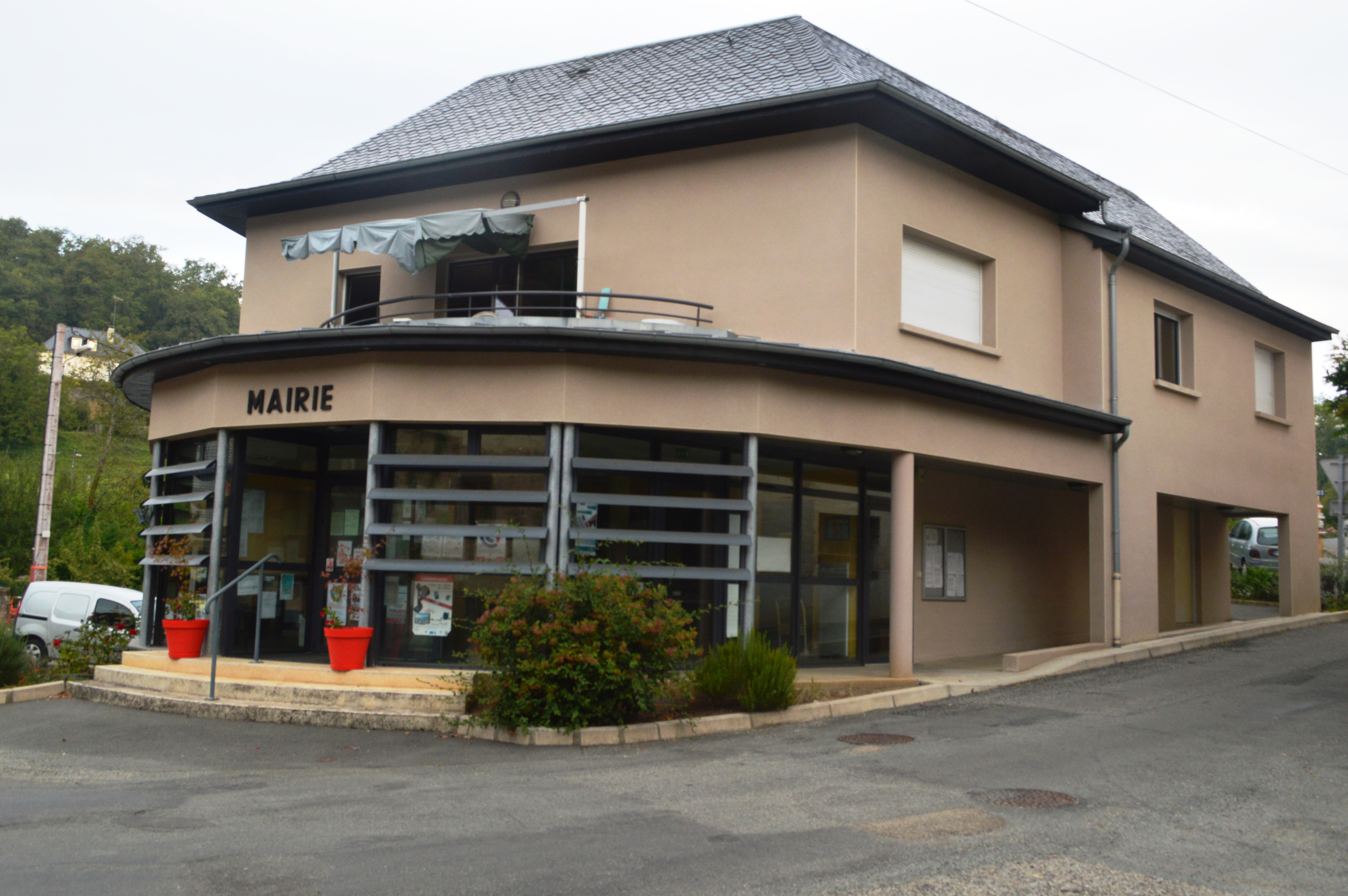
The Town Hall

Mayors from 1938

From	To	Name
1938	1944	Emile Boyé
1944	1945	Benjamin Viguier
1945	1947	Adrien Ruffié
1947	1959	Joseph Delsol
1959	1977	Armand Lacombe
1977	1989	Frédéric Bourdoncle
1989	1995	Michel Cantala
1995	2001	Jean Bousquet
2001	2008	Michel Cantala
2008	2020	Jean-Louis Francès
2020	2026	Benoît Olivié

== Demography ==
The inhabitants of the commune are known as Auzitois or Auzitoises in French.

Historical population

Year	Pop.	±% p.a.
1793	455	—
1800	426	−0.94%
1806	1,655	+25.38%
1821	1,999	+1.27%
1831	1,346	−3.88%
1836	1,236	−1.69%
1841	1,370	+2.08%
1846	1,424	+0.78%
1851	1,407	−0.24%
1856	1,471	+0.89%
1861	1,591	+1.58%
1866	1,754	+1.97%
1872	1,832	+0.73%
1876	2,085	+3.29%
1881	1,943	−1.40%
1886	2,083	+1.40%
1891	1,890	−1.93%
1896	1,950	+0.63%
1901	1,968	+0.18%

Year	Pop.	±% p.a.
1906	1,980	+0.12%
1911	1,771	−2.21%
1921	1,771	+0.00%
1926	1,680	−1.05%
1931	1,616	−0.77%
1936	1,547	−0.87%
1946	1,359	−1.29%
1954	1,377	+0.16%
1962	1,373	−0.04%
1968	1,128	−3.22%
1975	1,011	−1.55%
1982	932	−1.16%
1990	803	−1.84%
1999	812	+0.12%
2007	890	+1.15%
2012	859	−0.71%
2017	846	−0.30%
2023	824	−0.44%

Source: EHESS and INSEE

== Culture and heritage ==
=== Civil heritage ===
- Remains of a Castle. Long before the present church was built a castle dominated the valley. The castle consisted of two towers, buttresses, towering ramparts, a drawbridge, a moat, and a crypt.
- Picturesque villages in Auzits and upper Rulhe.

=== Religious heritage ===
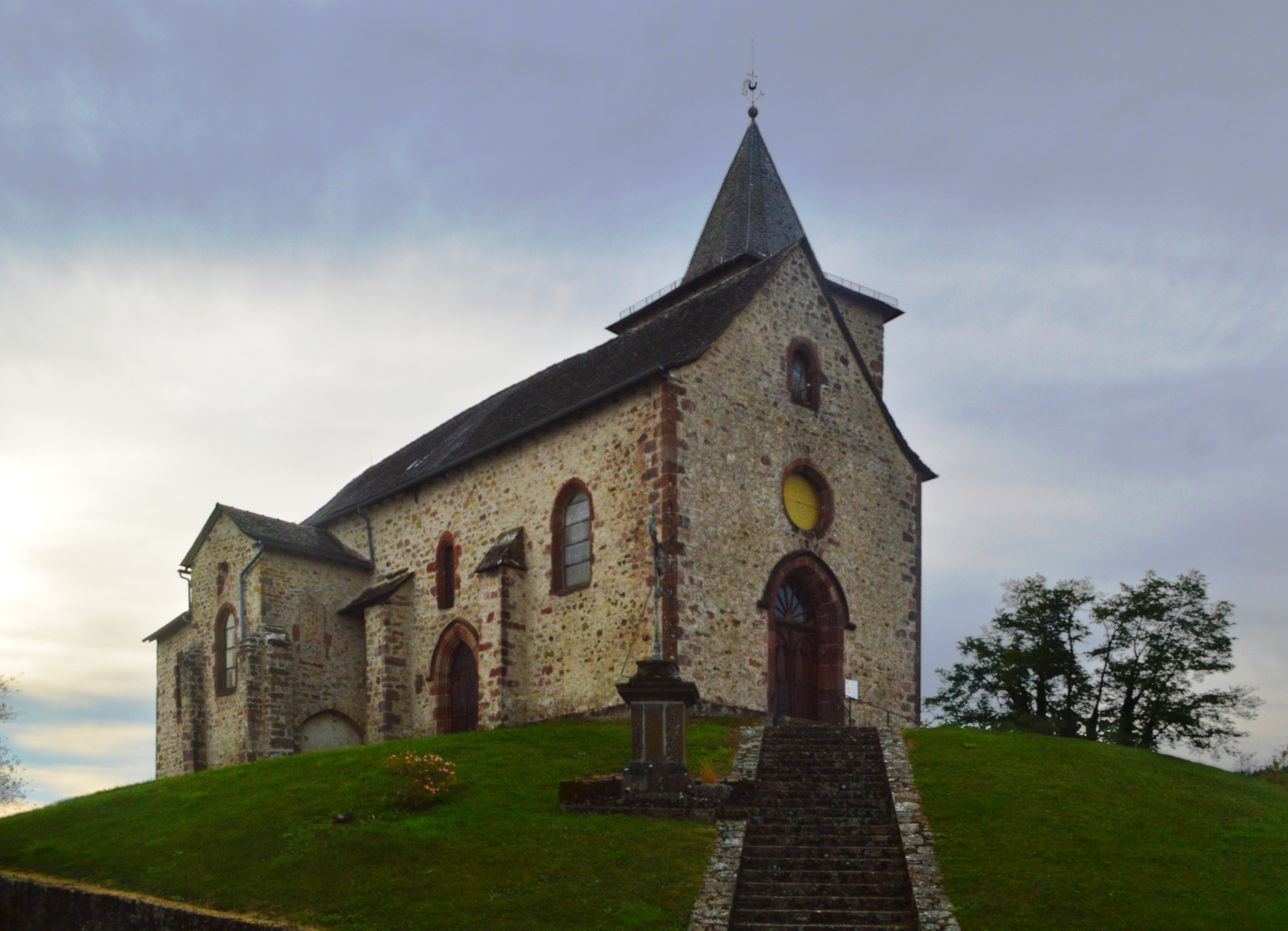
The Church of Saint Maurice

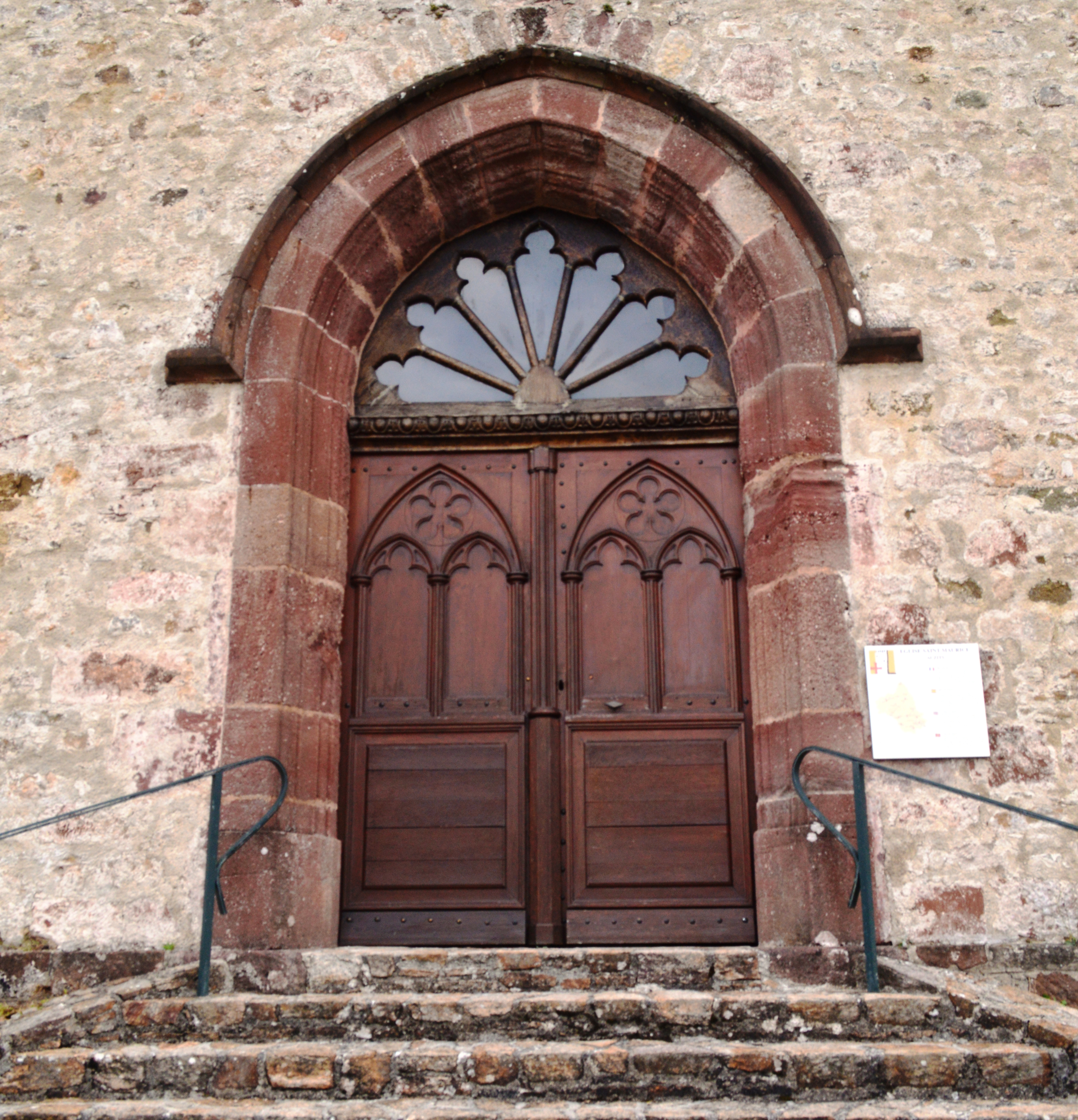
Church of Saint Maurice Portal

The commune has one religious building that is registered as an historical monument:

- The Church of Saint Maurice (12th century). The church of Saint-Maurice is a curious building because of its architecture. The crypt is oriented east and is part of the old castle chapel. Long abandoned by their inhabitants, these places are now freely available for visits. Decorated with wall paintings dating from the 14th century, this crypt is one of the jewels of Middle Ages Aveyron. Inside the church the altar, made of wood, has sculptures of Saint Maurice. In the centre a painting shows Jacques de Mauleon Labastide, Knight of the Order of Saint John of Jerusalem. Many treasures are no longer present in the church as they were stolen in 2001. Notably a Virgin and Child, dating from the 16th century in polychrome wood and gilded with gold. The Church contains several items that are registered as historical objects:
  - A Reliquary-Monstrance (19th century)
  - A Statue: Virgin and child (15th century)
  - A Ciborium (18th century)
  - 2 Cruets with plate (19th century)
  - A Statue: Virgin and child (15th century)
  - A Retable and Painting: Saint Maurice (1610)
  - A Processional Cross (17th century)
  - A Reliquary-Monstrance (19th century)

Other religious sites of interest

- Church of Saint Étienne de Rulhe.
- Chapel of Saint John of the Hospital.
- Chapel of Hautesserre.
- Cross of Hymes.

== Notable people linked to the commune ==
- Raoul Follereau, researcher and scientist.
- Robert Girou, painter.
- Roger Noyer, resistance fighter.
- Marcial Pleinecassagne, resistance fighter killed for keeping silent in the face of the Germans in 1944.

== See also ==
- Communes of the Aveyron department

=== Bibliography ===
- Christian-Pierre Bedel, Rinhac: Anglars, Ausits, Bèl Castèl, Bornasèl, Gotrens, Las Candolièiras, Mairanh / Christian-Pierre Bedel and los estatjants del Rinhagués, Rodez, Mission départementale de la culture, coll. Al canton, 1991, ill., cov. ill., 28 cm, 230 p. (ISBN 2-907279-04-1, ISSN 1151-8375, BnF No. FRBNF36652250) (in French)
