= Piette =

Piette may refer to:

- Albert Piette (born 1960), Belgian anthropologist
- Édouard Piette (1827–1906), French archaeologist
- Jacques Piette (1926–1990), French politician
- Josly Piette (born 1943), Belgian politician
- Ludovic Piette (1826–1878), French Impressionist painter
- Maurice Piette (1871–1953), Monégasque politician
- Samuel Piette (born 1994), Canadian soccer player
