= Aubin, Aveyron =

Commune in Occitanie, France

Aubin
- Commune
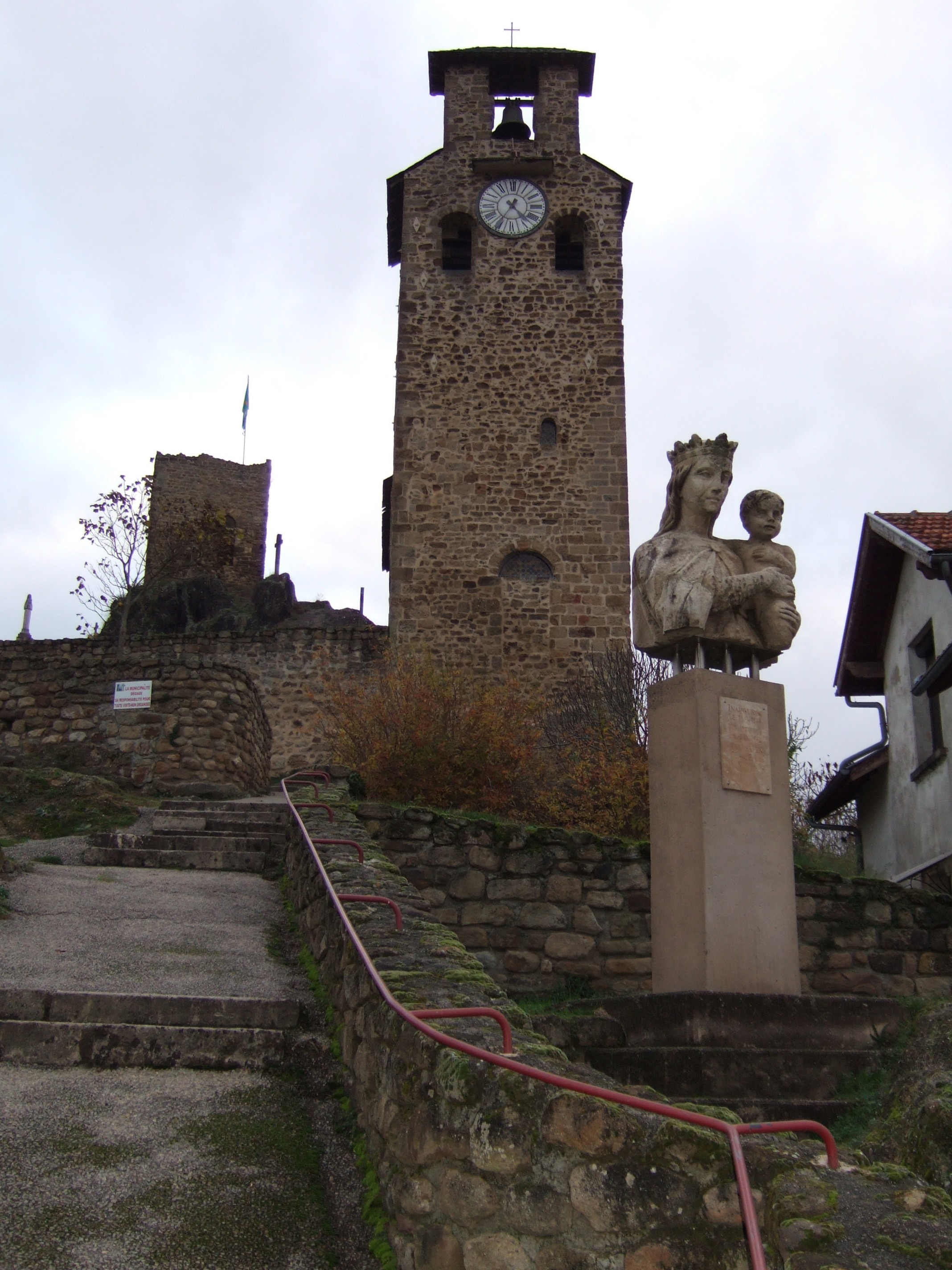
- Fort Aubin

- Coat of arms
- Location of Aubin
- Location within France Location within Occitanie
- Coordinates: 44°31′43″N 2°14′48″E
- Country: France
- Region: Occitania
- Department: Aveyron
- Arrondissement: Villefranche-de-Rouergue
- Canton: Enne et Alzou
- Intercommunality: CC Decazeville Communauté

Government
  - Mayor (2024–2026): Christine Teulier
- Area^{1}: 27.23 km^{2} (10.51 sq mi)
- Elevation: 342 m (1,122 ft)
- Highest elevation: 500 m (1,600 ft)
- Lowest elevation: 211 m (692 ft)
- Population (2023): 3,444
  - Density: 126.5/km^{2} (327.6/sq mi)
- Time zone: UTC+01:00 (CET)
  - Summer (DST): UTC+02:00 (CEST)
- INSEE/Postal code: 12013 /12110
- ^{1} French Land Register data, which excludes lakes, ponds, glaciers > 1 km^{2} (0.386 sq mi or 247 acres) and river estuaries.

Aubin (French pronunciation: [obɛ̃]; Languedocien: Aubinh) is a commune in the Aveyron department in the Occitanie of southern France.

== Geography ==
Aubin is located some 20 km south-east of Figeac and immediately south of Decazeville. Access to the commune is by road D 5 from Viviez in the north-west which passes through the centre of the commune and the town and continues south to Montbazens. The D221 goes from the town north to Decazeville. The D 11 goes east from the town to Cransac. The minor D 513 road branches off the D 5 on the north-western border of the commune and goes east through the north of the commune to Firmi. The Capdenac-Gare to Rodez railway line passes through the commune and there is a station at the town: Aubin station. Apart from the town there are the hamlets and villages of Severac, Ruffies, Cerons, La Croix du Broual, Combes, Tramons, Ruau, Les Escabrins, and Saugiere. The commune is mixed forest and farmland with significant sized urban areas.

The Riou Morte flows through the north-eastern corner of the commune as it flows north-west before turning west at Decazeville. The Enne river flows through the commune and the town from the east and continues north-west to join the Riou Morte at Viviez. The Ruisseau du Banel flows from the east north of the village and joins the Enne on the north-western border of the commune.

== History ==
=== Classical Antiquity ===
Lucien Mazars, an author of numerous books on local history, wrote in Aubin; its history, from its origins to the Revolution of 1789: "tradition [says] that Aubin, which bore the name Albin until the end of the 18th century, was founded by the Roman General Declus Clodius Albinus or in his honour". However, General Albinus did not exercise the functions of a legate in Gaul but rather in Roman Britain. His control of Gaul was probably too short to be able to found a town.

=== Middle Ages ===
Fort Aubin initially served as a fortress and then was occupied during the Middle Ages by the Lords of Rouergue. The town became the center of important coal mines, and also had iron mines.

=== Contemporary era ===
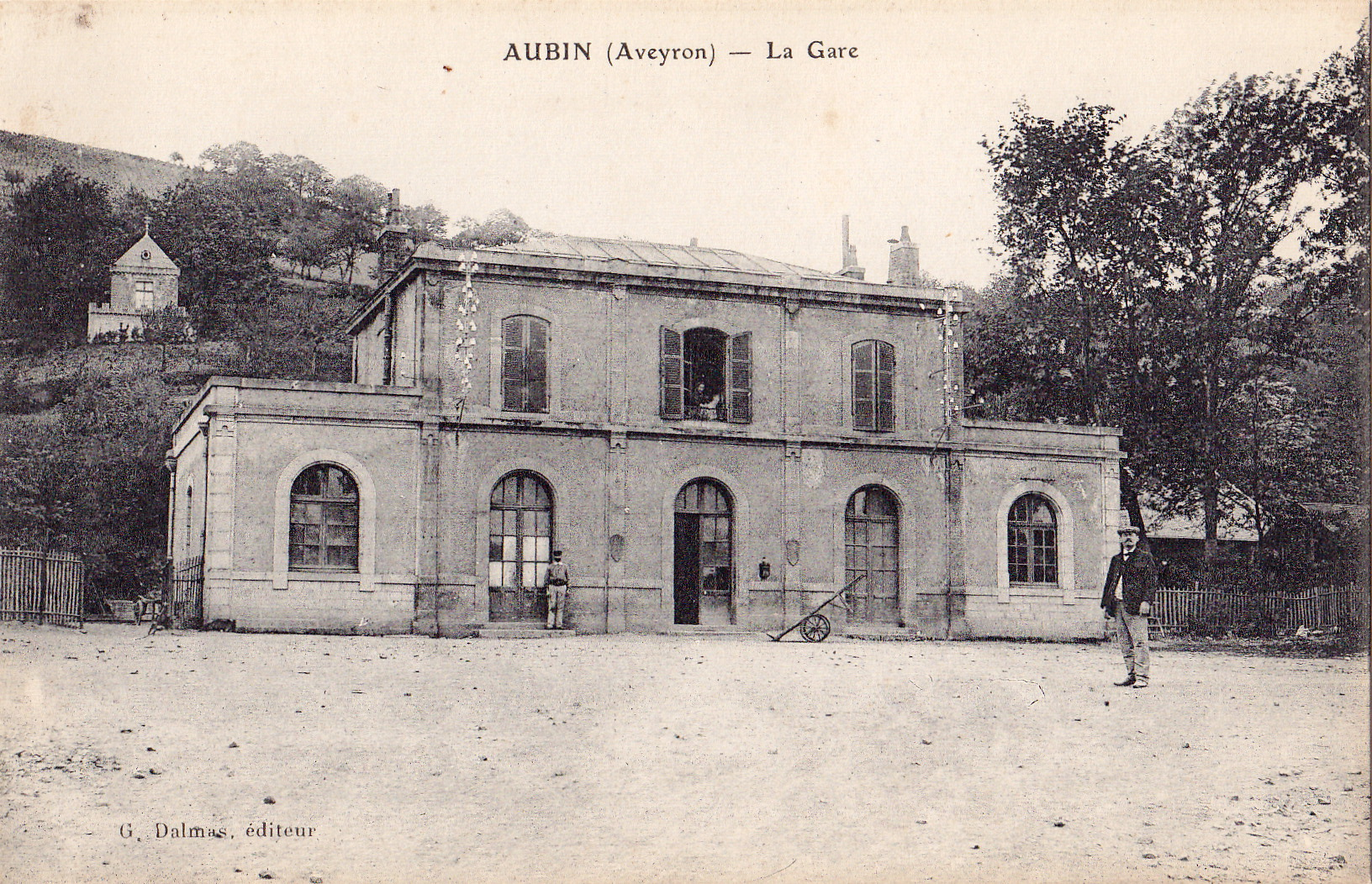
An old postcard of Aubin station in the 1900s

The commune was the capital of the District of Aubin from 1790 to 1800.

In October 1869 soldiers fired on a demonstration of miners killing 14 and injuring 20. This was the second strike in the Second Empire after the one in June 1869 at La Ricamarie. Captain Bernard Gosseran who gave the order to fire on strikers was later made a chevalier of the Legion of Honour. This tragedy inspired the Ode à la Misère (Ode to Misery) (Note: The poem in the original French: " - Quel âge as-tu ? - Seize ans.: De quel pays es-tu ? D'Aubin.; N'est-ce pas là, dis-moi, qu'on s'est battu?; On ne s'est pas battu, l'on a tué.: La mine Prospérait.; Quel était son produit ? - La famine.; Oui, je sais, le mineur vit sous terre, et n'a rien. Avec la nuit de plus, il est galérien.: Mais toi, faisais-tu donc ce travail, jeune fille ?; Avec tout mon village et toute ma famille, Oui. Pour chaque hottée on me donnait un sou. Mon grand-père était mort, tué du feu grisou. Mon petit frère était boiteux d'un coup de pierre. Nous étions tous mineurs, lui, mon père, ma mère, Moi. L'ouvrage était dur, le chef n'était pas bon. Comme on manquait de pain, on mâchait du charbon. Aussi, vous le voyez, monsieur, je suis très maigre; Ce qui me fait du tort - Le mineur, c'est le nègre. Hélas, oui ! - Dans la mine on descend, on descend. On travaille à genoux dans le puits. C'est glissant. Il pleut, quoiqu'on n'ait pas de ciel. On est sous l'arche D'un caveau bas, et tant qu'on peut marcher, on marche; Après on rampe; on est dans une eau noire; il faut Étayer le plafond, s'il a quelque défaut; La mort fait un grand bruit quand tout à coup elle entre; C'est comme le tonnerre. On se couche à plat ventre. Ceux qui ne sont pas morts se relèvent. Pas d'air. Chaque sape est un trou dont un homme est le ver. Quand la veine est en long, c'est bien; quand elle est droite, Alors la tâche est rude et la sape est étroite : On sue, on gèle, on tousse; on a chaud, on a froid. On n'est pas sûr si c'est vivant tout ce qu'on voit. Sitôt qu'on est sous terre on devient des fantômes. Les pauvres paysans qui vivent sous les chaumes Respirent du moins l'air des cieux. On étouffait.: Pourquoi ne pas vous plaindre aussi ? - Nous l'avons fait.; Nous avons demandé, ne croyant pas déplaire, Un peu moins de travail, un peu plus de salaire.: Et l'on vous a donné, quoi ? - Des coups de fusil.; Je m'en souviens, le maître a froncé le sourcil. Mon père est mort frappé d'une balle. - Et ta mère ?: Folle. - Et tu n'as plus rien ? - Si. J'ai mon petit frère.; Il est infirme… " Victor Hugo,Ode à la Misère) and the Aubin poems to Victor Hugo.

Aubin railway station on the Capdenac-Gare to Rodez line opened in 1858.

=== Heraldry ===
Arms of Aubin	Blazon: Gules, a lion of Or, in chief Sable, a pick-axe to sinister and a hammer to dexter of Argent handled of Or posed saltirewise debruised by a miner's lamp of Argent lighted in Gules.

== Administration ==
List of Successive Mayors

Mayors from the French Revolution to 1939

From	To	Name
1790	1791	Jacques Rouch Labraguiere
1791	1792	Antoine de Lalande
1792	1794	Joseph Domergue
1794	1794	Joseph Alary
1794	1795	Joseph Domergue
1795	1796	Dominique Lalande
1796	1796	Jean-Jacques Descrozaille
1796	1799	Jean-Baptiste Bessiere
1799	1800	Dominique Lalande
1800	1813	Jean-Jacques Descrozaille
1813	1844	Brassat Saint-Parthem
1844	1848	Eugène Alary
1848	1870	Auguste Maruejouls
1870	1871	Adolphe Segala
1871	1872	Auguste Maruejouls
1872	1881	Charles Coince
1881	1894	Henri Descrozaille
1894	1900	Jean Barbau
1900	1904	Henri Descrozaille
1904	1924	Jules Cabrol
1924	1935	Albert Maurs
1935	1939	Edmond Ginestet

Mayors from 1939

From	To	Name	Party
1939	1944	Prosper Vergnes	
1944	1944	Jean Nicot	
1944	1963	Edmond Ginestet	
1963	1965	Jean Martin	
1965	1971	René Gres	
1971	1989	Lucien Mazars	
1989	1995	Robert Debuchy	
1995	2008	Pierre Beffre	PS
2008	2020	André Martinez	
2020	2022	Laurent Alexandre	
2022	2024	Michel Baert	
2024	2026	Christine Teulier	

== Demography ==
The inhabitants of the commune are known as Aubinois in French.

Historical population

Year	Pop.	±% p.a.
1793	3,150	—
1800	2,935	−1.00%
1806	2,954	+0.11%
1821	2,364	−1.47%
1831	3,392	+3.68%
1836	3,017	−2.32%
1841	3,078	+0.40%
1846	3,321	+1.53%
1851	4,413	+5.85%
1856	8,048	+12.77%
1861	7,856	−0.48%
1866	8,863	+2.44%
1872	8,832	−0.06%
1876	9,864	+2.80%
1881	9,317	−1.13%
1886	9,054	−0.57%
1891	9,052	−0.00%
1896	9,781	+1.56%
1901	9,973	+0.39%

Year	Pop.	±% p.a.
1906	9,986	+0.03%
1911	9,574	−0.84%
1921	9,740	+0.17%
1926	9,387	−0.74%
1931	8,322	−2.38%
1936	7,495	−2.07%
1946	7,982	+0.63%
1954	8,275	+0.45%
1962	7,821	−0.70%
1968	6,635	−2.70%
1975	6,283	−0.78%
1982	5,782	−1.18%
1990	4,846	−2.18%
1999	4,360	−1.17%
2007	4,237	−0.36%
2012	3,937	−1.46%
2017	3,761	−0.91%
2023	3,444	−1.46%

Source: EHESS and INSEE

== Culture and heritage ==
=== Civil heritage ===
The commune has two buildings and structures that are registered as historical monuments:

- 2 Factory Chimneys (1847)
- The Jules Ferry du Gua School (1876). Designed by Emmanuel Brune and built between 1876 and 1880. It is 59 metres long and 12 metres wide built on a terrace overlooking the small houses which make up the suburb of Gua.
- The Town Hall contains several items that are registered as historical objects:
  - A Statue: Maid of Honour at the Court of Francis I (1870)
  - A Painting with frame: Miners of the Saar (1950)
  - A Painting with frame: Unnamed abstract (1973)
  - A Painting with frame: Confidences (1950)

Other sites of interest

- The Departmental House of Memory: Museum of resistance, deportation, and citizenship
- The Museum of Mines

=== Religious heritage ===
The commune has several religious buildings and structures that are registered as historical monuments:

- The Church of Notre-Dame-des-Mines (1942). The Church also contains many items that are registered as historical objects:
  - A set of monumental paintings: Resurrection and Appearance of Christ, Ascension of Christ, Crowning of the Virgin (20th century)
  - A painting: Wayside Cross (1952)
  - A set of monumental paintings: Virgin and Child, Calvary and episodes of life of miners, Saint Famille (1951)
  - A set of monumental paintings and Wayside Cross: Cycle of the Passion of Christ, Episodes of life of miners (1951, 1952)
- The Church of Saint-Blaise (1486). The Church also contains many items that are registered as historical objects:
  - A Statue: Virgin and Child (16th century)
  - A Group Sculpture: The Resurrection (15th century)
  - A Statue: Christ on the Cross (12th century)
  - A Group Sculpture: The Baptism of Christ (15th century)
  - A Baptismal font (13th century)
  - A Consecration Cross (12th century)
  - An Altar (12th century)
- The Church of Gua (1865)

== Facilities ==
=== Sports ===
- The Étoile Sportive de Combes, a football club since 1921.

== Notable people linked to the commune ==
- François Cogné, sculptor.
- Marie-Claire Bancquart, university professor, writer and poet, born in Aubin in 1932.
- Serge Mesonès, French footballer, born in 1948, died in 2001 at Aubin.
- Lilian Bathelot, novelist, author, born at Aubin in 1959.
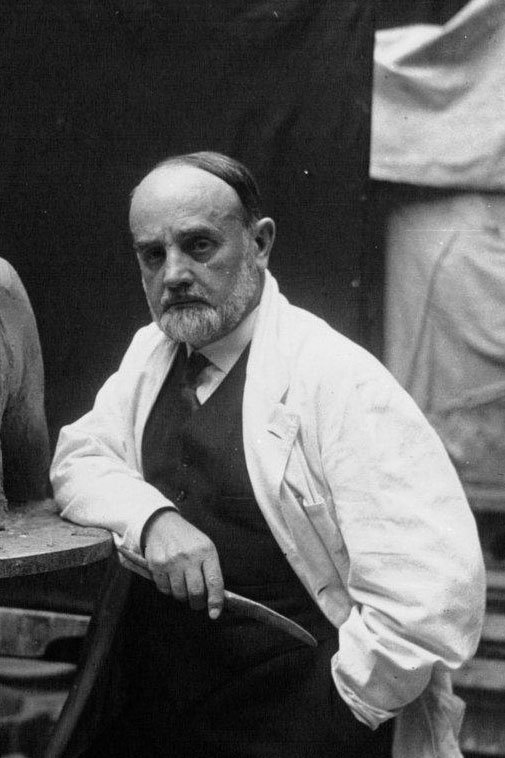
François Cogné in 1931

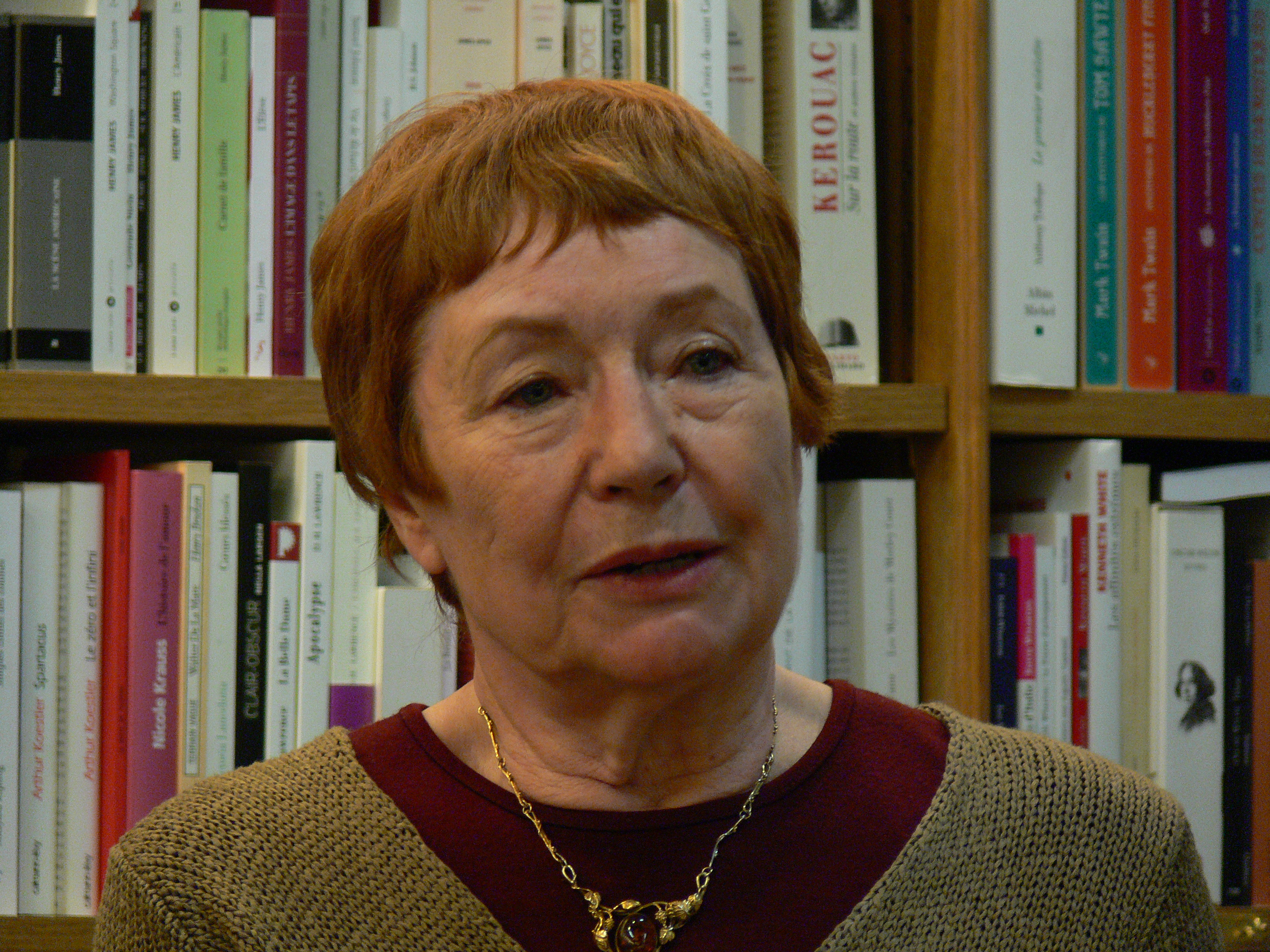
Marie-Claire Bancquart in 2010

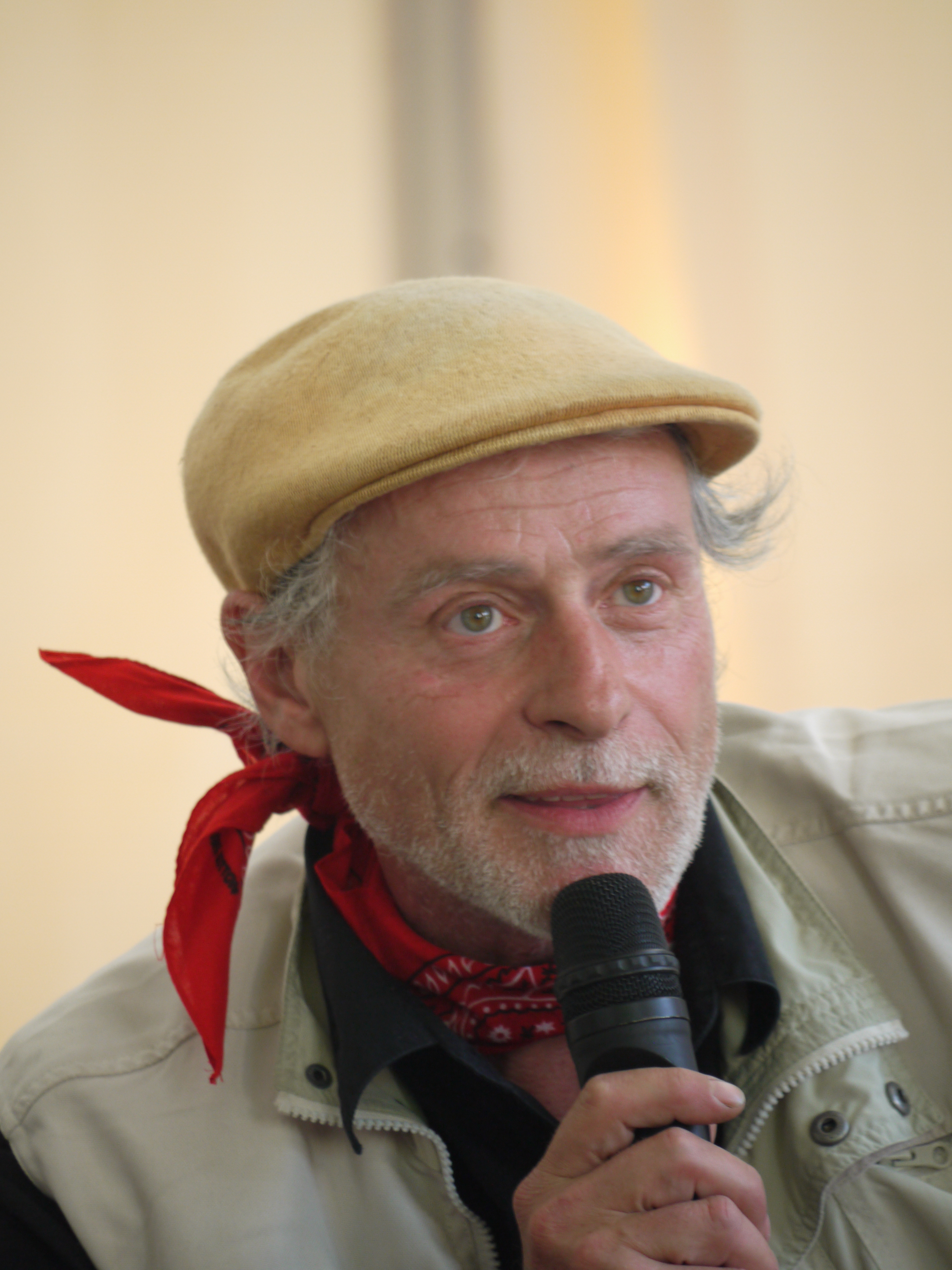
Lilian Bathelot in 2010

== See also ==
- Communes of the Aveyron department

=== Bibliography ===
- Lucien Mazars, Aubin, its history from its origins to the Revolution of 1789, L. Mazars, Aubin, 1982, 119 pages, Cov. ill., ill., 22 cm, BnF 34761590s (in French)
- Lucien Mazars, Mining Land, Aubin-Decazeville basin, Fil d'Ariane, Rodez, 1999, 285 pages, ill., cov. ill., 22 cm, ISBN 2-912470-16-1, BnF 36978991r (in French)
- Lucien Mazars and Francis Mazars, Mining Land in pictures, Decazeville-Aubin basin, Association des amis du Musée de la mine Lucien Mazars, Aubin, 2009, 265 pages, ill. in b&w and colour., cov. ill., 24 cm, ISBN 978-2-7466-0685-2, BnF 41491412h (in French)
- Madeleine Raygade-Panassié, Memories of Combes, coal and fire country, Association des amis du Musée du Rouergue, Rodez, 1994, 99 pages, ill., cov. ill., 24 cm, BnF 366921465 (in French)
- Christian-Pierre Bedel, preface by Pierre Beffre, Aubinh, Cransac, Firmin, Vivièrs / Christian-Pierre Bedel e los estatjants del canton d'Aubinh, Al canton collection, Mission départementale de la culture, Rodez, 1998, 247 pages, ill., cov. ill., 28 cm, ISBN 2-907279-38-6, ISSN 1151-8375, BnF 36708370b (in Spanish)
- Michel Girval, Aubin, Le Gua, Combes in the time of old postcards, Amicale laïque et républicaine de la commune d'Aubin, Aubin, 1999, 200 pages, ill., cov. ill. in colour, 30 cm, ISBN 2-9513481-0-X, BnF 37038703v (in French)
- Engineer Senez, Aubin - Geological Map of the coal basin of Aubin (Aveyron) made in 1840, Cartographic Manuscript Document, s.n., s.l., 1840, 1 flle: ms., 40x48 cm, BnF 407204575 (in French) See online
- Marie-Line Montbroussous, History of a successful integration, the Spaniards in the Decazeville basin, Éd. du Rouergue, Rodez, 1995, 199 pages, ill., cov. ill., 23 cm, ISBN 2-905209-99-2, BnF 36685891f (in French)
- Gérard Pertus and Michel Herranz, Basin of Decazeville, Aubin, Cransac, Firmi, Viviez, factories and metalworkers. Vol. 1, Association de sauvegarde du patrimoine industriel du Bassin de Decazeville, Decazeville, 2010, 238 pages, ill., cov. ill., 31 cm, ISBN 978-2-9531052-3-0, BnF 42307098h (in French)
- Gérard Pertus and Michel Herranz, Basin of Decazeville, Aubin, Cransac, Firmi, Viviez, factories and metalworkers. Vol. 2, Association de sauvegarde du patrimoine industriel du Bassin de Decazeville, Decazeville, 2012, 237 pages, ill., cov. ill., 31 cm, ISBN 978-2-9531052-4-7, BnF 43520392g (in French)
- Gérard Pertus and Michel Herranz, Mines and miners, Decazeville basin: Aubin, Cransac, Firmi, Viviez, Association de sauvegarde du patrimoine industriel du Bassin de Decazeville, Decazeville, 2008, 211 pages, ill., cov. ill., 31 cm, ISBN 978-2-9531052-1-6, BnF 41420313w (in French)
- Gérard Pertus and Michel Herranz, Mine Pits, Decazeville basin: Aubin, Cransac, Firmi, Viviez, Association de sauvegarde du patrimoine industriel du Bassin de Decazeville, Decazeville, 2007, 117 pages, ill., cov. ill., 31 cm ISBN 978-2-9531052-0-9, BnF 411843247 (in French)
- Christian-Pierre Bedel, preface Pierre Beffre, Aubinh, Cransac, Firmin, Vivièrs / Christian-Pierre Bedel e los estatjants del canton d'Aubinh, Rodez, Mission départementale de la culture, 1998, Al canton coll., 247 pages, ill., cov. ill., 28 cm, ISBN 2-907279-38-6, ISSN 1151-8375, BnF 36708370 (in French)

=== External links ===
- Aubin official website (in French)
- Church of Notre-Dame website (in French)
- Aubin on the old IGN website (in French)
- The Miner on the sculptor's website (in French)
- Aubin on Géoportail, National Geographic Institute (IGN) website (in French)
- Albin on the 1750 Cassini Map
