= Raymond de Geouffre de La Pradelle =

French lawyer (1910–2002)

Raymond de Geouffre de la Pradelle
- Born: 22 November 1910; Paris, France
- Died: 19 July 2002 (aged 91); Versailles, France
- Occupation: Lawyer

Raymond de Geouffre de La Pradelle de Leyrat (November 22, 1910 – July 19, 2002) was a French lawyer.

== Biography ==
=== Family ===
Geouffre de La Pradelle's name is derived from a village located in the commune of Rignac in Aveyron. Born to Albert Geouffre de La Pradelle and Thérèse Paul-Toinet, he married Hélène Boudet de Castelli (b. 1915) on October 11, 1934. Castelli and Geouffre de La Pradelle had three children together: Géraud, Arnaud, and Marie-Ange. After getting divorced from Castelli, he married Éliane Puech on June 12, 1972.

=== Education ===
He studied at the Lycée Buffon and the École Tannenberg in Paris. He became a graduate of the Free School of Political Science in diplomacy and became secretary of the Italo-Ethiopian Commission of 1928. Later, in 1935, a member of the Conference of Lawyers In 1938, he became the organization's secretary general, and in 1951, vice-president. From 1956 to 1960, de Geouffre was a member of the French division of the International Law Association. He served as the general secretary of the International Juridical Air Committee from 1952 to 1955, and later became a member of the France-Egypt Association in 1965.

== Career ==
Before World War II, Geouffre de La Pradelle took the defense of members of the far-right terrorist organisation La Cagoule. During the German Occupation of France, Geouffre de La Pradelle also defended people prosecuted for taking part in the resistance movement, some of which, like Jacques Foccart, he hid in his home, as well as collaborators following the end of the war, as per the request of the nuncio and future Pope John XXIII, including his uncle Pierre, a municipal councilor, lawyer and magistrate, who was prosecuted for his role as an investigating judge under the Vichy government.

In 1949, whilst defending German soldiers prosecuted in French courts, Geouffre de La Pradelle asked Henri Donnedieu de Vabres for clarification on the legal basis of the Nuremberg trials. He then sat, within the Allied High Commission, on the steering committee of the Association for the Safeguarding of French Assets and Interests Abroad (ASBIFE), alongside representatives of firms such as Saint-Gobain, Schlumberger, Société alsacienne de constructions mécanique (transl. Alsatian company in mechanical construction), as well as the rubber, petroleum, chemical, mechanical and electrical construction, textile and food industries, including five champagne houses.

On September 27, 1956, Geouffre de La Pradelle published a guest column on the question of whether Egypt had violated international law during the Suez Crisis. In 1959, in Le Monde, he rejected any Soviet takeover of the Moon after the Moon landing of Luna 2. In 1960, in an article in Le Figaro, he argued that only Germany had jurisdiction to try Adolf Eichmann, and that the State of Israel did not.

Geouffre de La Pradelle defended Holocaust denier Paul Rassinier, whom he described as "sick of the truth". In 1962, he defended four diplomats: André Mattei, Jean-Paul Bellivier, Henri Mouton, and André Miquel accused of espionage by the government of Gamal Abdel Nasser who were released after the intervention of Hassan II, the King of Morocco, and Henri, the Count of Paris. On May 26, 1967, he wrote a guest column concerning the legal status of the Gulf of Aqaba on the eve of the Six-Day War.

In 1974, following the hostage-taking at the French embassy in the Netherlands by the Japanese Red Army, and the day after the attack on a drugstore in Saint-Germain-des-Prés, for which the Venezuelan terrorist Carlos the Jackal had claimed responsibility, Geouffre de La Pradelle declared that an embassy was not extraterritorial and had immunity. The following year, he defended Patrick de Ribemont, the alleged mastermind, according to Michel Poniatowski, of the assassination of Prince Jean de Broglie, and this time had France condemned by the European Court of Human Rights (ECHR) on 10 February 1995 and 7 August 1996.

In 1978, Geouffre de La Pradelle defended the publisher Fernand Sorlot, accused of having re-published Mein Kampf. He argued in court that Adolf Hitler's book was a historical document, which should, as such, be freely available.

On October 22, 1981, Geouffre de La Pradelle defended former militiaman Paul Touvier, accused of crimes against humanity since June 19. He spoke of Touvier's "evasiveness" in the face of his responsibilities and his "manifest cowardice". In the same year, he defended Jean Bedel Bokassa and spoke about practices "contrary to his ethical principles", after having been questioned for having received 'blank signatures'.

On August 10, 1982, Geouffre de La Pradelle wrote a guest column, after the Israeli military intervention in Lebanon in 1982, concerning the case law prohibiting the bombing of buildings and civilian populations.

== Books ==
- La monarchie, Éditions internationales, 1944
- L'affaire d'Ascq, Éditions internationales, 1949
- Le problème de la Silésie et le droit, Éditions internationales, 1958
- Aux frontières de l'injustice, Albin Michel, 1979

== Bibliography ==
- Le sionisme contre Israël, de Nathan Weinstock, 1969
- Des hommes libres : histoires extraordinaires de l'histoire, de Jean-Pierre Allali, Haim Musicant, 1986
- La monarchie aujourd'hui, de Pierre Pujo, 1988
- Bokassa Ier un empereur français, de Stephen Smith, Géraldine Faes, 2000
- Dark Age: The Political Odys, de Brian Titley, 2002
- Le Théâtre de Satan : décadence du droit, partialité des juges, d'Éric Delcroix, Paris, L'Æncre, 2002.
- Les entreprises françaises face à l’Allemagne de 1945 à la fin des années 60, de Jean-François Eck, 2013
- Paul Touvier et l'Église: Rapport de la commission, de René Rémond, 2014
- Comment l'idée vint à M. Rassinier: Naissance du révisionnisme, de Florent Brayard, 2014
- L'Affaire Touvier: Quand les archives s'ouvrent, de Bénédicte Vergez-Chaignon, 2016
- Nobility and patrimony in modern France, d'Elizabeth C. Macknight, 2018
