= Géraud de Geouffre de La Pradelle =

Professor of French law (1935–2022)

Géraud de Geouffre de La Pradelle de Leyrat (1935-October 16, 2022) was an international jurist and a professor of French law.

== Biography ==
=== Family ===
He is the son of lawyer Raymond de Geouffre de la Pradelle, the grandson of Albert de Geouffre de La Pradelle and the uncle of Anne-Véronique Herter. He has two children with Claire Bardon Florence (wife Cédric Thomas) and Laure (wife François de Montpellier de Vedrin).

Emeritus Professor of the University of Nanterre, he worked from 1982 to 1988 at the center for information on Palestinian and Lebanese prisoners.

In 2003, he co-authored the first Que sais-je?, on homosexual rights.

In 2004, he chaired the Citizens' Commission of Inquiry into the Involvement of France in Rwanda, a collective denouncing France's actions surrounding the Rwanda genocide. In 2014, he co-wrote an article sharply critical of judge Jean-Louis Bruguière's 2006 ruling.

He was an occasional contributor to Le Monde diplomatique and was a member of the sponsoring committee of the Russell Tribunal on Palestine.

== Books ==
- Droit international privé, avec Marie-Laure Niboyet, Librairie générale de droit et de jurisprudence, ISBN 978-2-275-03035-7
- L'Homme juridique, Presses universitaires de Grenoble/François Maspero, coll. "Critique du droit", 1979
- Caroline Mécary et Géraud de La Pradelle, Les droits des homosexuel(le)s, PUF, Que sais-je ?, 2003, 1998, ISBN 978-2-13-053145-6

== Publications ==
- Rafaëlle Maison; Géraud de Geouffre de La Pradelle (2014). "L'ordonnance du juge Bruguière comme objet négationniste". Cités (57): 79–90.
- Dzovinar Kévonian; Philippe Rygiel; Géraud de Geouffre de La Pradelle (2015). "Entretien avec Géraud de Geouffre de La Pradelle". Monde(s). 1 (7): 155–172.
