= Paris Nanterre University =

French university in the Academy of Versailles

Coordinates: 48°54′14″N 2°12′50″E

- Université Paris Nanterre
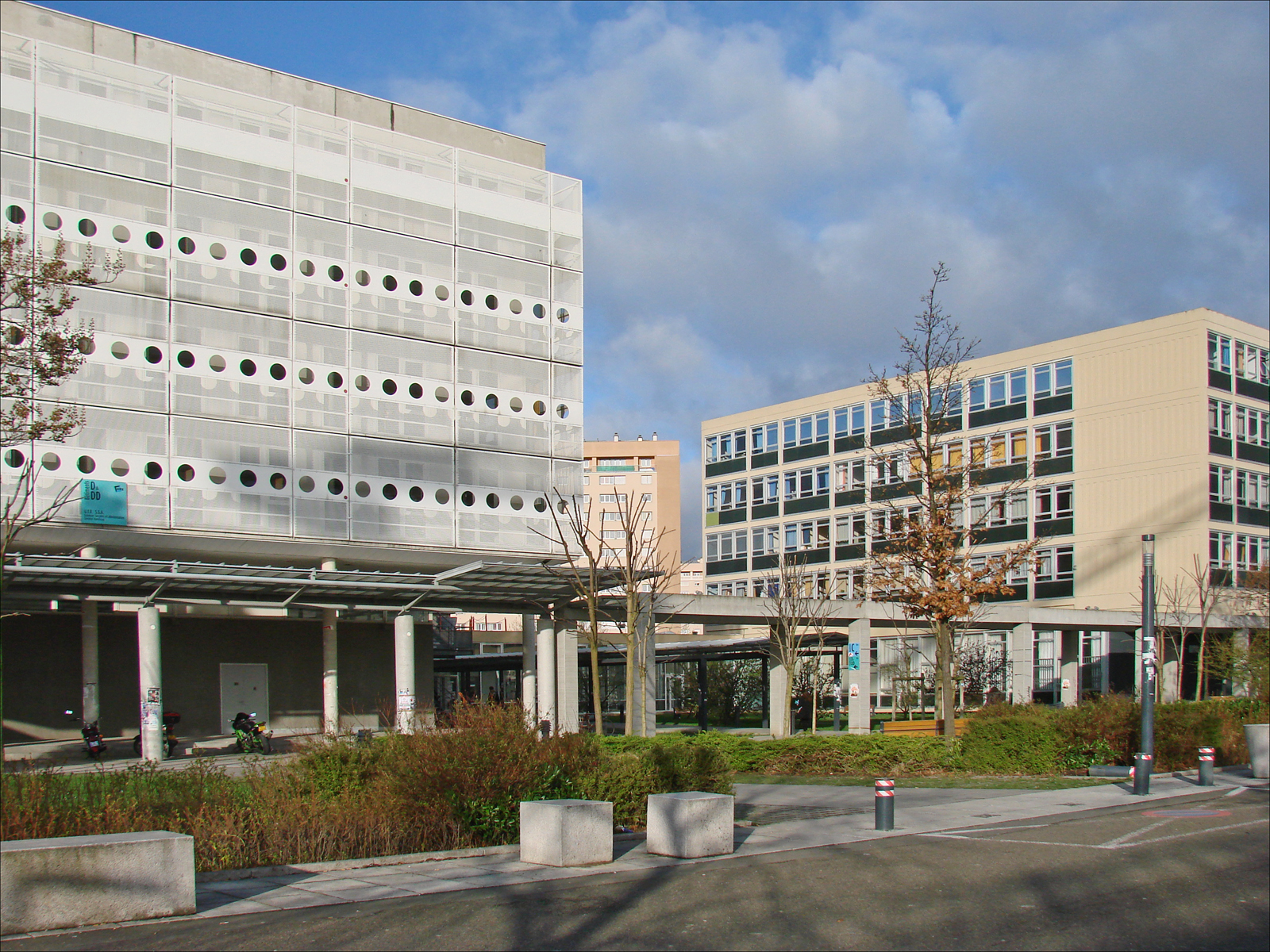
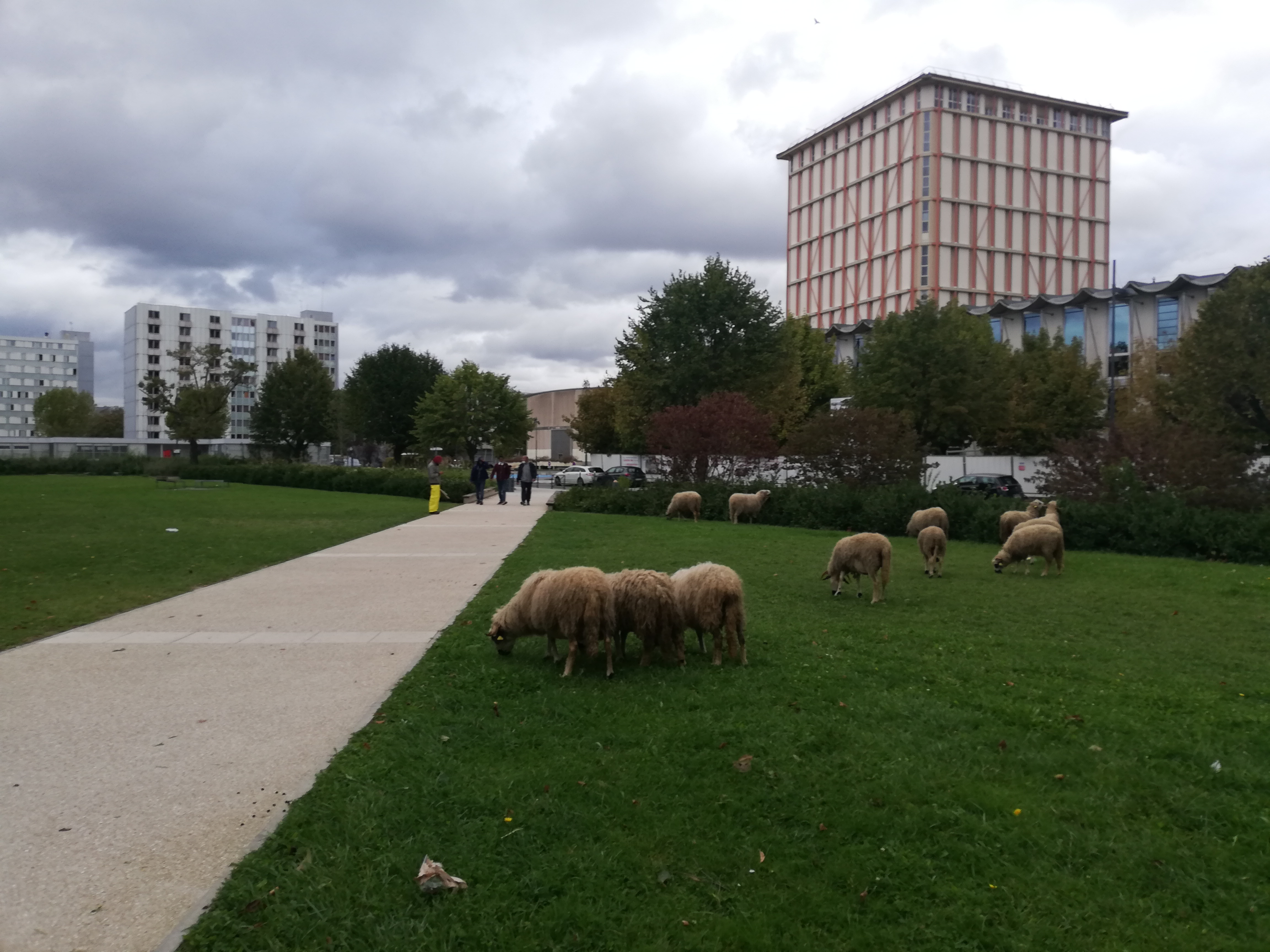
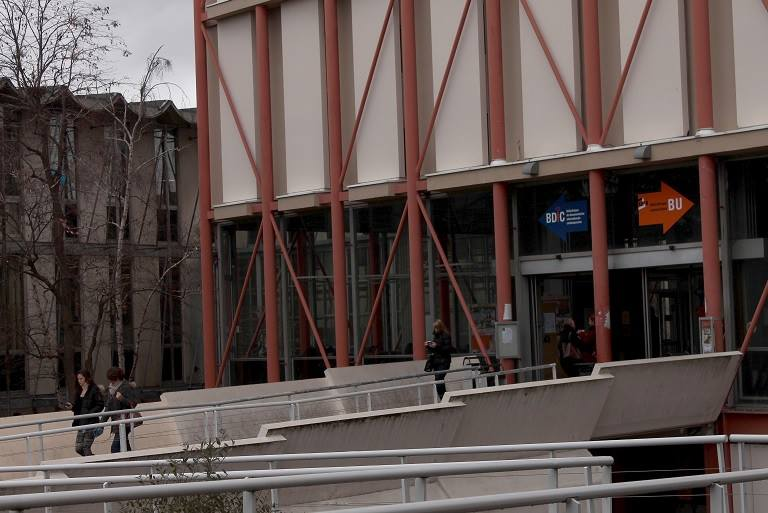
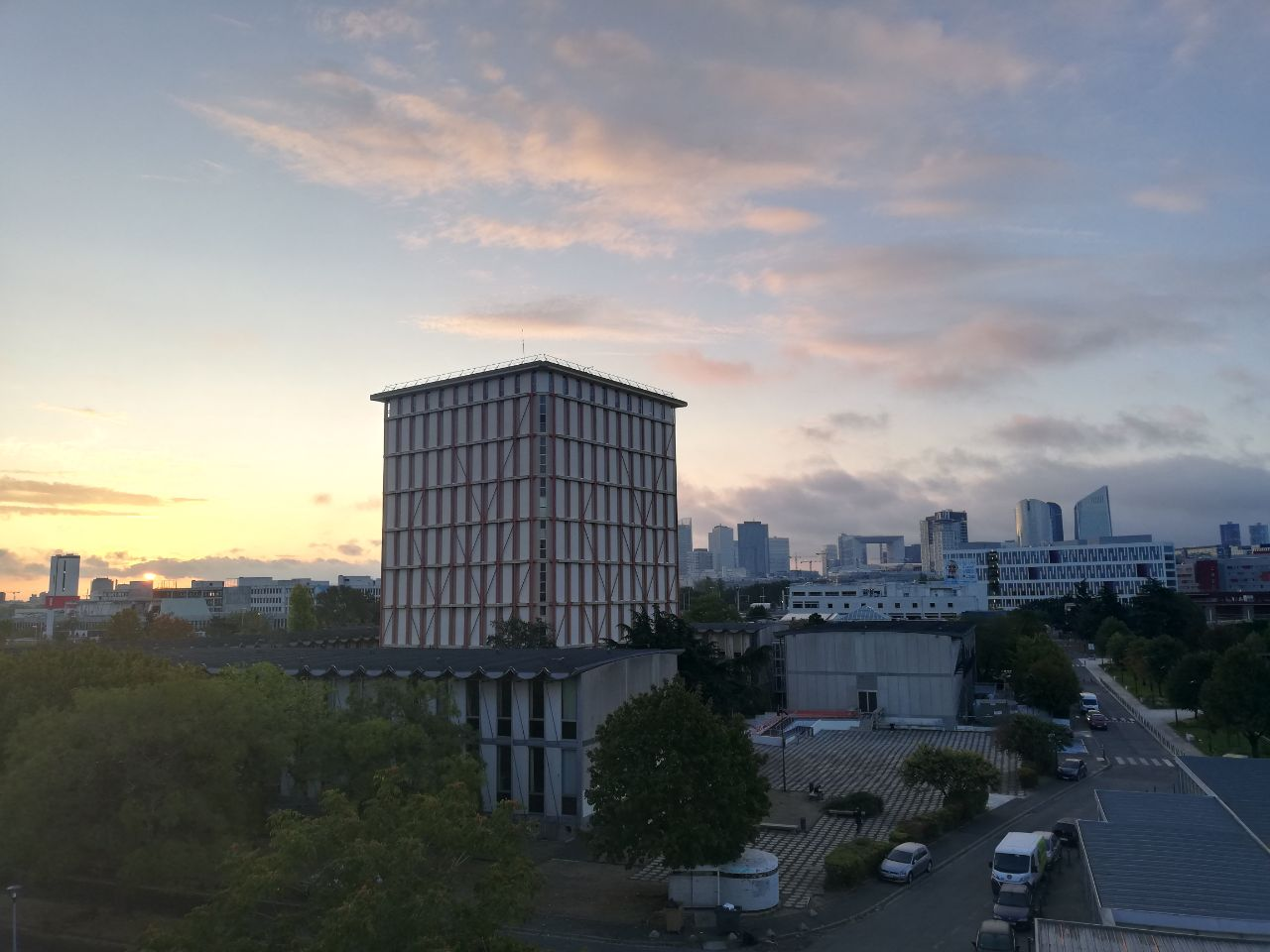
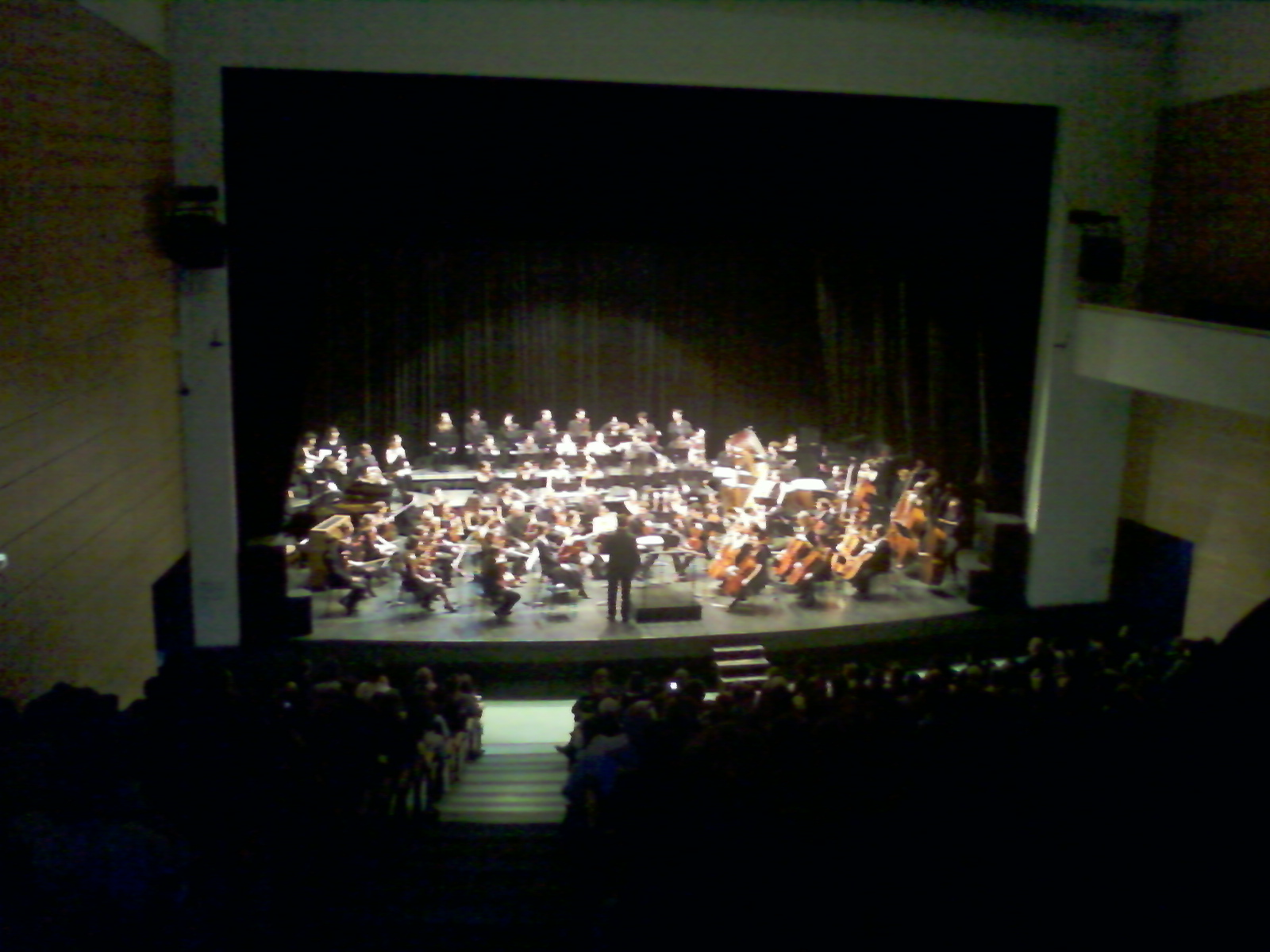
- Former names: University of Paris-X, University of Paris West
- Type: Public
- Established: 1964; 62 years ago (as a satellite campus of the Sorbonne); 1970; 56 years ago (current legal status)
- Affiliations: Chancellery of the Universities of Paris; European University Association; Renater; Couperin (consortium)
- President: Caroline Rolland-Diamond (since 2024)
- Students: 32,000
- Location: Nanterre, France
- Campus: 75 acres (30 ha); Urban, Nanterre, Ville-d'Avray, Saint-Cloud, La Défense
- Colors: Grey and Red
- Nickname: Nanterre
- Website: parisnanterre.fr

Paris Nanterre University (French: Université Paris Nanterre), formerly University of Paris West, Paris X and commonly referred to as Nanterre, is a public research university based in Nanterre, Hauts-de-Seine, France, in the Paris metropolitan area. It is one of the thirteen successor universities of the University of Paris. The university is located in the western suburb of Nanterre, in La Défense area, the business district of the Paris area.

Paris Nanterre University alumni include more than 15 cabinet officials, heads of state or government from France and around the world, like Emmanuel Macron, Nicolas Sarkozy and Dominique de Villepin. Alumni also include heads of central banks, legislators and business people, like Christine Lagarde, Dominique Strauss-Kahn or Vincent Bolloré.

== History ==
=== The Nanterre campus of the University of Paris ===
The Nanterre campus was built in the 1960s on the outskirts of Paris as an extension of the University of Paris. On November 2, 1964, the Nanterre Faculty of Arts and Humanities opened as an annex to the Faculty of Arts of the University of Paris (La Sorbonne), which it relieved. It became one of the largest teaching campuses in Paris.

Nanterre became famous shortly after its opening by being at the center of the May '68 student rebellion. The campus was nicknamed "Nanterre, la folie" (Mad Nanterre) or "Nanterre la rouge" (Red Nanterre, in reference to communism).

When it was founded in 1965, Nanterre "raised great hopes" and "was to be a place of experimentation for renewed teaching, the outline of tomorrow's university", benefiting from the contribution of "famous professors" who "voluntarily left the University of Paris to take part in the Great Adventure". Henri Lefebvre, professor of sociology from 1965 to 1968, influenced the students who initiated the May 68 movement, and then provided an on-the-spot analysis of the events.

In 1964, Nanterre was home to 2,300 students, and by 1968 it was expected to absorb 12,000.

=== Paris-X, then the University of Paris West ===
It was set up as an independent university in December 1970 as "University of Paris-X". Based on the American model, it was created as a campus (as opposed to the old French universities which were smaller and integrated with the city in which they were located). When the new autonomous university was created, the Ville-d'Avray University Technical Institute was attached to it.

In 1985 and 1989, decentralized branches were founded. In 1984, the promulgation of the Savary law, which created the current university departments (UFR), led to the opening of a satellite campus in Saint-Quentin-en-Yvelines in 1985, followed in 1989 by the opening of another satellite campus in Cergy-Pontoise. In 1991, the University of Versailles - Saint-Quentin and the University of Cergy-Pontoise became full-authority universities.

In the 1980s and 2000s, the university was the scene of student protests. In 2008, the University of Paris-X became the "University of Paris West".

=== The Paris Nanterre University ===
In 2016, it became "Paris Nanterre University". During the same year, the new Max Weber Humanities and Social Sciences Centre was inaugurated. It includes 1 amphitheater, several meeting rooms and 124 offices, mainly for teacher-researchers.

In September 2023, five "Youth with Macron" activists were attacked by a dozen militants from the ultra-left group La Jeune Garde, who had come to put up posters for a demonstration "against police violence".

In November of the same year, in reaction to the Gaza war, pro-Palestinian and anti-Semitic tags proliferated on the university campus.

== Campus ==
Nanterre is the second largest campus in France after Nantes, with its own Olympic-sized swimming pool and a stadium. It welcomes 35,000 to 40,000 students every year in all fields of studies: Social Sciences, Philosophy, Literature, History, Languages and Linguistics, Economics, Law and Political Sciences, as well as Teacher Training, Acting, Cinema, Physiology and Sports.

The university's facilities:

- La Contemporaine Library and Museum;
- Le Pixel Library;
- the Bernard-Marie Koltès Theater;
- and the University Sports Centre.

The university is known for its speciality in the fields of Law and Economics. Even though French universities are required by law to admit anyone with a Baccalauréat, strain is put on the students from the start and the first year drop-out rate consistently hovers in the 60% region. At the postgraduate level, the university offers competitive programs (highly selective master's degrees in Law and Business) and partnerships with some grandes écoles such as the Ecole Polytechnique, ESSEC, Ecole des Mines de Paris, and ESCP Europe among others.

The Rene Ginouves Institute for Archaeology and Anthropology (Maison de l'archeologie et de l'ethnologie Rene Ginouves) is another important institution on campus, merging the departments of the CNRS, Paris I-Panthéon Sorbonne and Paris X-Nanterre.

As in most Parisian universities, there is a large minority of foreign exchange students.

== Innovative programs ==
Over the years, Nanterre has developed innovative programs such as the double bilingual courses in French Law and Anglo-American, Spanish, Russian, German or Italian law; in Economics & Management (with half of the courses in French and half of the courses in another foreign language); and in History (with half of the courses in French and half of the courses in another foreign language). These programs have inspired many universities and grandes écoles throughout the country and are now renowned on a national level.

=== Nanterre Network ===
The Franco-German Summer and Winter Universities with higher education institutions of third countries (Nanterre Network) are an expression of the increasing internationalization of studies and research (Erasmus program; Bologna process, EU enlargement). In legal sciences, the management of the Franco-German studies at the University of Paris Nanterre plays a pioneering role in the establishment of Summer and Winter Universities. Thus, within the framework of its Europe-wide network for university cooperation (Nanterre Network), in collaboration with German and other foreign partners, Summer and Winter universities have been emerging since 2004 in Central and Eastern Europe, in the Balkans and in the Mediterranean region − with financial support from the German-French University (DFH/UFA), the Franco-German Youth Service and the French Ministry of Higher Education and Research (Parceco-Program). Since 2013, these tri-national Summer and Winter Universities have also extended to non-European countries.

==== Objectives, function and functional principles of the Summer and Winter Universities ====
In September 2012, Bernard Cazeneuve, France's Deputy Minister for European Affairs and patron of the 2nd Franco-German Summer University for Energy and Environmental Law at the University of Paris Nanterre, saw in this type of Summer University a "successful" approach to bridge the lecture-free period; approach which can even be "exported" and is therefore "conducive to the prestige of Franco-German cooperation in Europe".

==== Lithuania ====
The oldest trinational Summer University in Vilnius, Lithuania, focuses on EU legal harmonization. It was founded in 2004 by the University of Paris Nanterre, the Johann Wolfgang Goethe-University in Frankfort on the Main and the University of Vilnius in the year of EU enlargement to countries particularly in Central and Eastern Europe. With their accession, the Baltic States were obliged to take over the entire law of the EU (acquis communautaire) and to implement the goals of the political Union as well as those of the economic and monetary Union. In the first few years, this Summer University was the joint end-of-year event for two binational law schools: the German-Lithuanian Law School (Goethe University of Frankfurt) and the Franco-Lithuanian Law School (Paris Nanterre).

==== Belarus ====
The Summer University in Minsk, founded in 2011 by the universities of Paris Nanterre, Potsdam and the Belarusian State University, is devoted to topics of general European relevance, such as "alternative dispute resolution", "new information and communication technologies", environmental issues and other current issues. As in the EU, in the post-Soviet Community of Independent States (CIS) the tendency towards regional integration goes hand in hand with the attempt to harmonize national legal systems. Belarus is part of the Russian-Belarusian Union and a member of the (2014 contractually agreed) Eurasian Economic Union.

==== Balkan countries ====
The Franco-German Summer University founded in 2014 by the University of Paris Nanterre and the Westphalian Wilhelms-University of Münster with the Balkan region has (for the first time in the history of these Summer Universities) an itinerant character. It takes place through several sessions with changing locations: starting in 2014 at the University of St. Cyril and Methodius Skopje (North Macedonia), the University of Pristina (Kosovo) and the European University of Tirana (UET: Albania). Since then, the scientific and intercultural dialogue between universities from EU countries (Germany, France, Greece) and from countries in the Balkans has intensified and expanded to other destinations in the region, through the progressive inclusion of new partner universities (previously Montenegro, Serbia, Bulgaria). Based on the self-image of both – of Western Balkan states candidate to EU accession, as well as that of the EU member states – the prospects of development of North Macedonia, Kosovo, Albania, Montenegro and other Western Balkan countries are discussed. The itinerant Summer University should determine to what extent the candidates already meet or will be able to meet the Copenhagen criteria for accession to the EU in the various legal areas concerned (private law, public law, private international law, international criminal law).

==== Turkey ====
Founded in January 2016 by the University of Paris Nanterre, the Friedrich Alexander University of Erlangen-Nuremberg and the University of Yeditepe Istanbul, this first German-French-Turkish Winter University in Istanbul is devoted to the theory and practice of private law enforcement. Against the background of the hesitant negotiations between the EU and the permanent candidate Turkey (which so far has at best been granted a "privileged partnership") since 2005, this issue is of great relevance for European Union law and the law of its member states, and for Turkish law (especially for consumer law, contract law, competition law, security regulations, constitutional law, labor law, arbitration or mediation). As a result of the tense domestic political situation in Turkey, the Winter University has not yet continued. After the failed coup against the Turkish president in July 2016, the state wave of cleansing did not omit the universities. The professors affected also included colleagues who were responsible for the cooperation with the French and German partner universities.

==== Maghreb states ====
In April 2013, Paris Nanterre, Potsdam et El Manar University founded in Tunis a Franco-German-Maghrebinian Summer University on the subject of "State policy in a comparative perspective". In the context of the Arab Spring, it takes into account the needs of the countries concerned in political, economic and geostrategic terms. It applies above all to the legal aspects of public policies to promote social and economic development, as well as the democratization of the state. In May 2014, at the 2nd (and provisionally last) Summer University at the Hassan II Mohameddia University in Casablanca/Morocco, the focus was on "Law versus Religion - Intersections and Possible Conflicts of Religious Norms for State Law and International Law". For the 3rd Summer University in June 2015 at the Ecole de Gouvernance et d'Economie (EGE) at the University of Mohammed VI-Polytechnique in Rabat/Morocco, the topic "Citizenship/Citoyenneté" was envisioned.

==== South America ====
In September 2013, Paris Nanterre, the Technical University of Dresden and the Pontifical Catholic University of Peru established in Lima the first Franco-German-Peruvian Summer University on the subject of "Democracy and the rule of law".

Given the reform policies in Peru since 2011, human rights issues and strategies to promote the rule of law, the welfare state and to fight corruption are at the center of discussions. The second trinational Summer University, organized in September 2014 by the universities of San Marcos and ESAN (the first graduate school of business in Latin America), was dedicated to the topic of "Economic and cultural foundations of the constitutional state". This Summer University is not limited to the university campus, but is open to civil society by including cultural institutions such as Goethe Institute and Alliance française in its program. Above all, this Summer University has a continuing education character because it specifically offers seminars for the officials of the Ministry of Justice and Human Rights.

==== Africa, Asia and Oceania ====
Since 2015/2016, the Franco-German studies at the University of Paris Nanterre under the direction of Professor Stephanie Dijoux, also set up trinational Summer and Winter Universities with higher education universities and research institutions in countries in the Eastern hemisphere.

== Rankings ==
In the QS, Paris-Nanterre University is ranked the 4th French higher-education institution in the field of arts and humanities, next to the Panthéon-Sorbonne University, Sorbonne University and the École normale supérieure de Paris, PSL University. The Times Higher Education World University Rankings considers Paris-Nanterre to be "one of the most prestigious universities in the country" and underlines the quality of its master's degree programs, its partnerships with the Grandes Ecoles, and its list of alumni.

In the Academic Ranking of World Universities (ARWU), also known as Shanghai Ranking, Paris-Nanterre University is ranked 50th in Archeology and 51st-100th in Anthropology.

Paris-Nanterre University's master's degree in Psychology is the first in France in terms of employability and professional integration, according to Parisien's ranking in 2018.

The university offers programs with selective master's degrees in Law and Business. Because of the number of applications submitted each year, this University is one of the most desired French high-education institutions, ranked 3rd in France.

== Notable people ==
List includes notable people both alumni and faculty of the University. Alumni who also served as faculty are listed in bold font.

=== Alumni ===
- Agnès Adjaho, Beninese Ambassador to Vatican City
- Jean-Jacques Aillagon, former French Minister of Culture
- Olivier Besancenot, former leader of the Ligue communiste révolutionnaire (LCR)
- Youssouf Bakayoko, former minister of foreign affairs of Ivory Coast
- Vincent Bolloré, current President & CEO of Bolloré
- Luc Brisson, philosopher
- Daniel Cohen, chaired professor at Paris School of Economics and contributor for Le Monde
- Daniel Cohn-Bendit known as "Dany le Rouge", leader of the May 68 student rebellion in France and former Member of the European Parliament (MEP)
- Mama Kanny Diallo, current Guinean Minister of Planning and Economic Development
- Abdelaziz Djerrad, former Prime Minister of Algeria
- Mike Downey, co-founder & CEO of Film and Music Entertainment and current Chairman of European Film Academy
- Alain Ehrenberg, sociologist
- Sylvie Germain, writer
- David Guetta, DJ, record producer, musician and songwriter
- María Ángela Holguín, former Colombian Minister of Foreign Affairs
- Brice Hortefeux, current Member of the European Parliament (MEP), former French Minister of the Interior
- Gwendoline Jarczyk, French philosopher and historian
- Christine Lagarde, current President of the European Central Bank, former Managing Director of the International Monetary Fund (IMF), former French Minister of Finance
- Ilaïsaane Lauouvéa, former Member of Congress of New Caledonia
- Cheng Li-chun, Vice Premier of Taiwan
- Leonardo López Luján, Mexican archaeologist and current Director of the Templo Mayor Project
- Marie Losier, filmmaker
- Emmanuel Macron, current President of France
- Jean-Luc Marion, philosopher
- Guillaume Martin, professional road cyclist
- Jeanne Mas, pop singer and actress
- Pierre Ménès, sports journalist
- Frederic Mitterrand, former French Minister of Culture
- Katalin Novák, former President of Hungary
- Dominique Ouattara, current First Lady of Ivory Coast
- Françoise de Panafieu, former Mayor of the 17th arrondissement of Paris
- Paloma Picasso, jewelry designer
- Manuel Pinho, former Portuguese Minister of Economy
- Yasmina Reza, playwright, actress, novelist and screenwriter
- Mustapha Saha, sociologist, writer, painter, co-founder of the Mouvement du 22 Mars at the Faculty of Nanterre in 1968
- Nicolas Sarkozy, former President of France
- Céline Sciamma, filmmaker
- Dominique Strauss-Kahn, former Managing Director of the International Monetary Fund (IMF), former French Minister of Finance
- Dominique Tchimbakala, Congolese journalist, television presenter and news anchor for TV5Monde
- Jany Temime, costume designer
- Dominique de Villepin, former Prime Minister of France
- Delcy Rodriguez, acting President of Venezuela

=== Faculty ===
- Maurice Allais, Nobel Memorial Prize in Economics in 1988
- Jean-Jacques Becker, historian
- René Rémond, historian and political economist
- Denis Buican (1983–2003), historian of biology
- Jack Lang (1986–1988; 1993–1999), politician
- Michel Aglietta, economist and founder of the regulation school
- Michel Crozier, sociologist and member of the Académie des sciences morales et politiques
- Emmanuel Lévinas (1967), philosopher
- Jean Baudrillard, philosopher.
- Paul Ricœur (1966–1970), philosopher
- Étienne Balibar, philosopher
- Henri Lefebvre, geographer, professor, and influential figure in the events of 1968
- André Legrand, professor of French and comparative public law, Human Rights, Civil Liberties
- Claude Lepelley (1984–2002), historian
- Robert Merle, novelist
- Louise Merzeau, communication scholar
- Alain Pellet, expert on international law
- Catherine Perret philosopher
- Michèle Perret, linguistics professor and novelist
- Albert Piette, professor of anthropology
- Yves Roucaute, philosopher, political scientist, Director of the "Cahiers de la Securite"
- LinDa Saphan, artist and professor of sociology
- Damianakos Stathis, Greek agriculturist and sociologist
- François Laruelle, philosopher
- Zoi Konstantopoulou, a Greek human rights lawyer and politician of the Coalition of the Radical Left (Syriza), also Speaker of the Hellenic Parliament
- Géraud de Geouffre de La Pradelle, professor of French law

== Nanterre in fiction ==
- La Chinoise, by Jean-Luc Godard, 1967
- My Sex Life...or How I Got Into an Argument, by Arnaud Desplechin, 1996
- The Spanish Apartment, by Cédric Klapisch, 2002
- District 13 (Banlieue 13), by Pierre Morel, 2004

== See also ==
- Chancellerie des Universités de Paris
- University of Paris
- Sorbonne
- Laboratoire d'ethnologie et de sociologie comparative
