= Serge Mesonès =

French footballer (1948-2001)

Serge Mesonès (15 March 1948, Decazeville – 1 November 2001) was a French footballer who played as a midfielder.

== Career ==
Mesonès played professional football for AS Nancy and AJ Auxerre, the club he helped reach the final of the 1978–79 Coupe de France.

After he retired from playing football, Mesonès became a sports journalist and a member of the French Communist Party.

== Personal life ==
On 1 November 2001, Mesonès died in Aubin, Aveyron at the age of 53.
