= Canton of Enne et Alzou =

Coordinates: 44.53°N 2.24°E

- Canton
- Situation of the canton of Enne et Alzou in the department of Aveyron
- Country: France
- Region: Occitania
- Department: Aveyron
- No. of communes: {{{nbcomm}}}
- Population (2023): 12,829
- INSEE code: 1206

The canton of Enne et Alzou is an administrative division of the Aveyron department, southern France. It was created at the French canton reorganisation which came into effect in March 2015. Its seat is in Aubin.

It consists of the following communes:

1. Anglars-Saint-Félix
2. Aubin
3. Auzits
4. Belcastel
5. Bournazel
6. Cransac
7. Escandolières
8. Firmi
9. Goutrens
10. Mayran
11. Rignac
