= Mayran =

Commune in Occitanie, France

- Commune
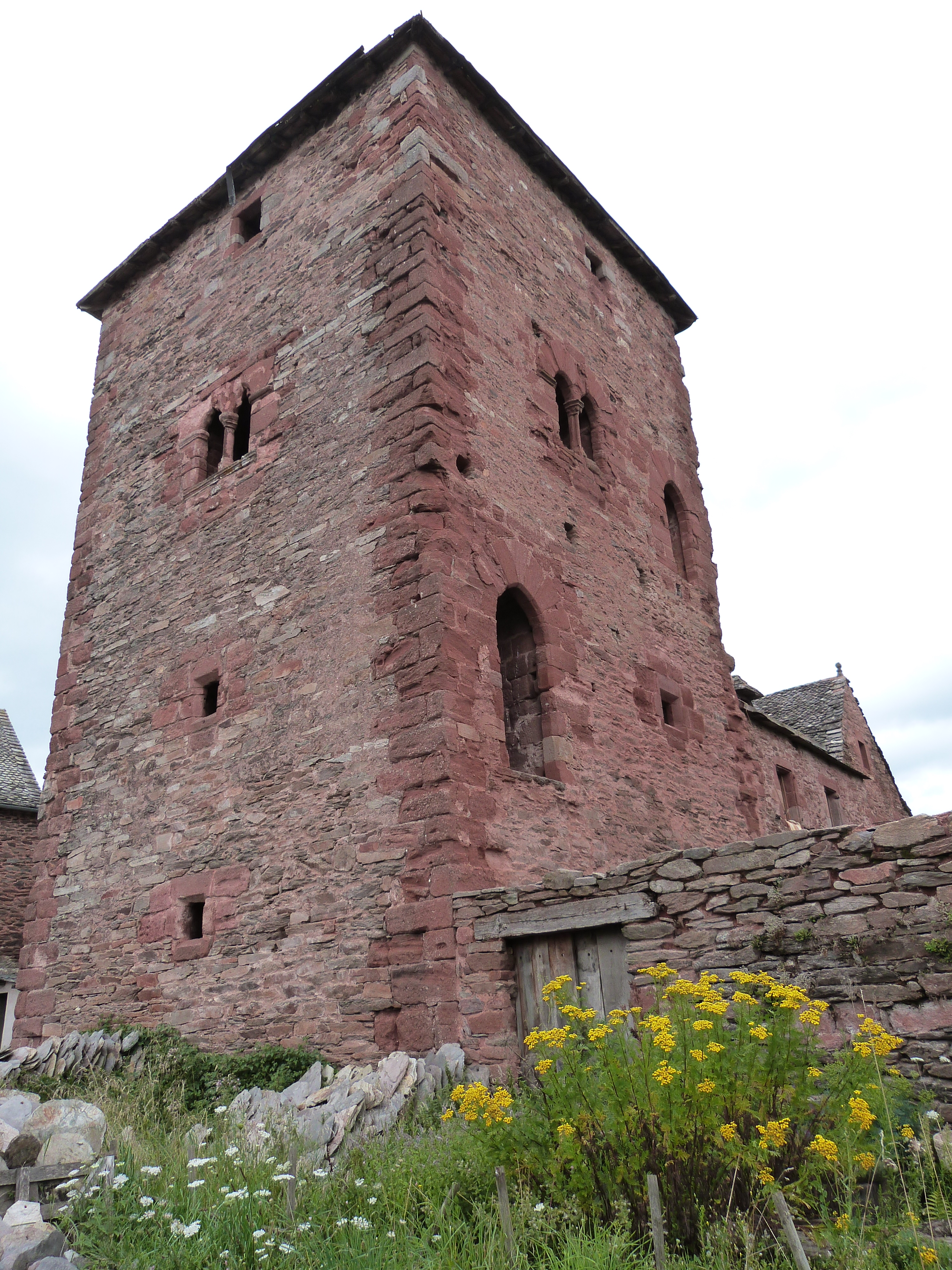
- Monastic tower
- Location of Mayran
- Location within France Location within Occitanie
- Coordinates: 44°23′21″N 2°21′51″E
- Country: France
- Region: Occitania
- Department: Aveyron
- Arrondissement: Villefranche-de-Rouergue
- Canton: Enne et Alzou
- Intercommunality: Pays Rignacois

Government
  - Mayor (2020–2026): Yves Mazars
- Area^{1}: 15.36 km^{2} (5.93 sq mi)
- Elevation: 730 m (2,400 ft)
- Highest elevation: 734 m (2,408 ft)
- Lowest elevation: 400 m (1,300 ft)
- Population (2023): 611
  - Density: 39.8/km^{2} (103/sq mi)
- Time zone: UTC+01:00 (CET)
  - Summer (DST): UTC+02:00 (CEST)
- INSEE/Postal code: 12142 /12390
- ^{1} French Land Register data, which excludes lakes, ponds, glaciers > 1 km^{2} (0.386 sq mi or 247 acres) and river estuaries.

Mayran (French pronunciation: [mɛʁɑ̃]; Occitan: Mairanh) is a commune in the Aveyron department in southern France.

== Population ==
Historical population
Year	Pop.	±% p.a.
1968	565	—
1975	520	−1.18%
1982	492	−0.79%
1990	472	−0.52%
1999	454	−0.43%
2007	511	+1.49%
2012	628	+4.21%
2017	635	+0.22%
2023	611	−0.64%
Source: INSEE

== Cultural Events and Festivities ==
14 and 15 August: Village festival organized by the Mayran Festival Committee.

== Places and Monuments ==
- Church of Saint Fabien and Saint Sébastien de Mayran
- Chapel of Notre-Dame du Soulié

== See also ==
- Communes of the Aveyron department
