= Goutrens =

Commune in Occitanie, France

- Commune
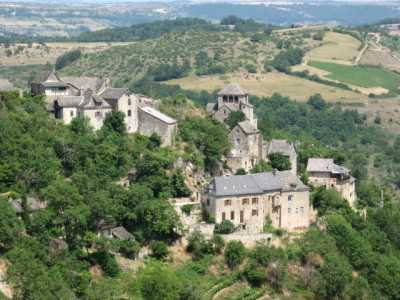
- The village of Cassagnes-Comtaux
- Location of Goutrens
- Location within France Location within Occitanie
- Coordinates: 44°26′38″N 2°22′13″E
- Country: France
- Region: Occitania
- Department: Aveyron
- Arrondissement: Villefranche-de-Rouergue
- Canton: Enne et Alzou
- Intercommunality: Pays Rignacois

Government
  - Mayor (2023–2026): Jean-Christophe Couderc
- Area^{1}: 25.99 km^{2} (10.03 sq mi)
- Elevation: 560 m (1,840 ft)
- Highest elevation: 725 m (2,379 ft)
- Lowest elevation: 331 m (1,086 ft)
- Population (2023): 492
  - Density: 18.9/km^{2} (49.0/sq mi)
- Time zone: UTC+01:00 (CET)
  - Summer (DST): UTC+02:00 (CEST)
- INSEE/Postal code: 12111 /12390
- ^{1} French Land Register data, which excludes lakes, ponds, glaciers > 1 km^{2} (0.386 sq mi or 247 acres) and river estuaries.

Goutrens is a commune in the Aveyron department in southern France.

== Population ==
Historical population
Year	Pop.	±% p.a.
1968	623	—
1975	531	−2.26%
1982	473	−1.64%
1990	441	−0.87%
1999	411	−0.78%
2007	420	+0.27%
2012	504	+3.71%
2017	509	+0.20%
2023	492	−0.56%
Source: INSEE

== See also ==
- Communes of the Aveyron department
