= Rignac, Aveyron =

Commune in Occitanie, France

Rignac
- Commune
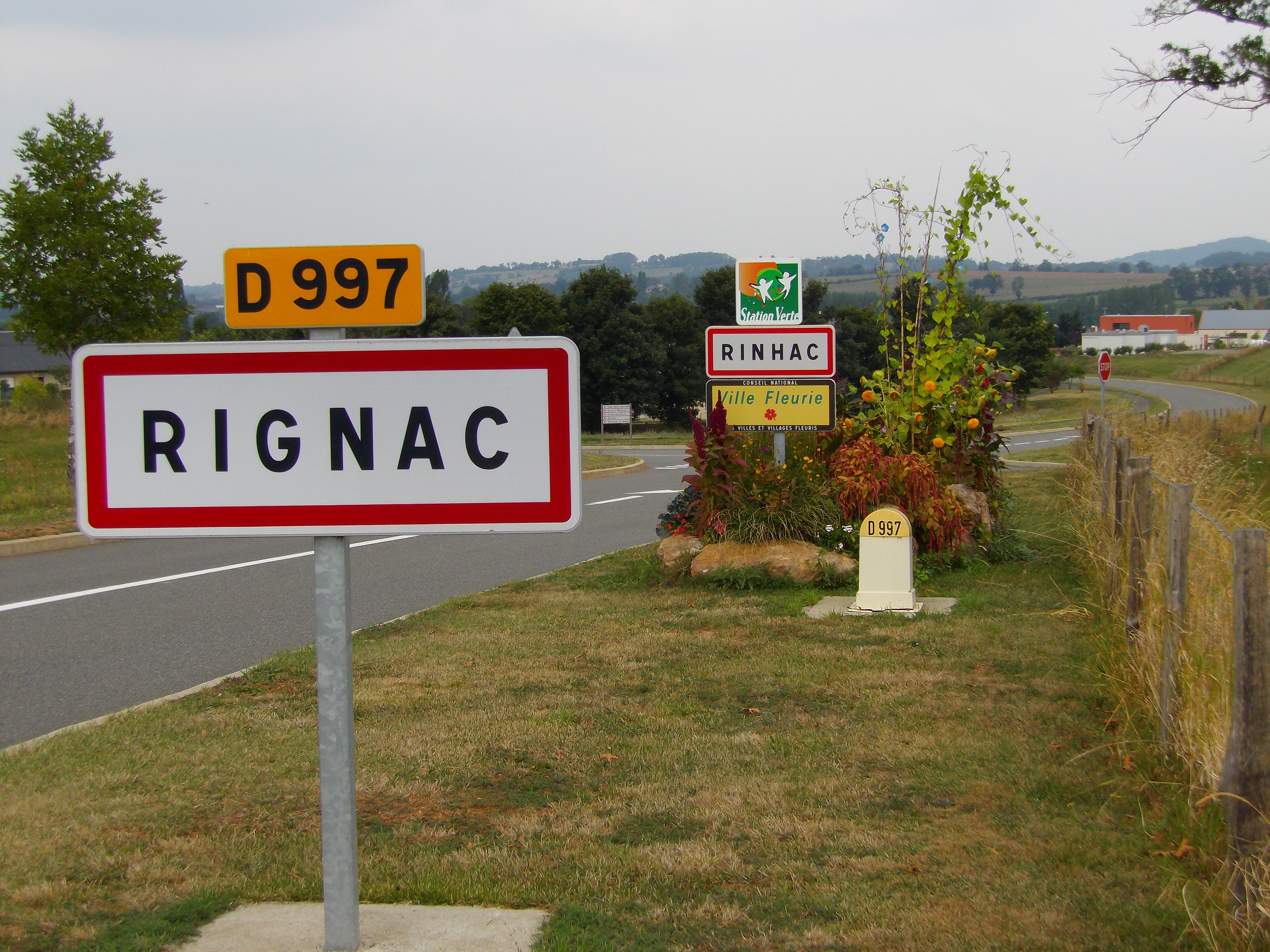
- The road into Rignac

- Coat of arms
- Location of Rignac
- Location within France Location within Occitanie
- Coordinates: 44°24′36″N 2°17′25″E
- Country: France
- Region: Occitania
- Department: Aveyron
- Arrondissement: Villefranche-de-Rouergue
- Canton: Enne et Alzou
- Intercommunality: Pays Rignacois

Government
  - Mayor (2020–2026): Jean-Marc Calvet
- Area^{1}: 33.35 km^{2} (12.88 sq mi)
- Elevation: 505 m (1,657 ft)
- Highest elevation: 684 m (2,244 ft)
- Lowest elevation: 390 m (1,280 ft)
- Population (2023): 2,000
  - Density: 60/km^{2} (160/sq mi)
- Time zone: UTC+01:00 (CET)
  - Summer (DST): UTC+02:00 (CEST)
- INSEE/Postal code: 12199 /12390
- ^{1} French Land Register data, which excludes lakes, ponds, glaciers > 1 km^{2} (0.386 sq mi or 247 acres) and river estuaries.

Rignac (French pronunciation: [ʁiɲak]; Languedocien: Rinhac) is a commune in the Aveyron department in southern France.

== Population ==
Historical population
Year	Pop.	±% p.a.
1968	1,675	—
1975	1,571	−0.91%
1982	1,585	+0.13%
1990	1,668	+0.64%
1999	1,658	−0.07%
2007	1,860	+1.45%
2012	1,901	+0.44%
2017	1,946	+0.47%
2023	2,000	+0.46%
Source: INSEE

== See also ==
- Communes of the Aveyron department
