= Albert Piette =

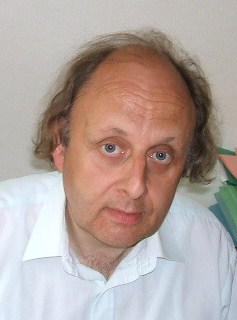
- Albert Piette Portrait
- Born: April 18, 1960 (age 65); Namur, Wallonia, Belgium
- Occupations: Professor, author

Albert Piette (born April 18, 1960) is a French anthropologist. He holds the position of professor at Paris Nanterre University.

Piette has conducted research with a focus on observation, particularly within the realm of religion. He has conducted analysis of everyday life, referring to it as the "minor mode of reality."

For several years, Piette has been dedicated to elaborating anthropology as a distinct discipline, delineating it as a science of the human being separate from sociology and ethnology. He advocates for precise theoretical and methodological frameworks within anthropology, aiming to incorporate the human being as a distinct entity within the field. While traditional anthropology focuses on cultural sets, social systems, situations, actions, and relations, Piette proposes existential anthropology to observe, describe, and analyze the micro-continuity of human existence, emphasizing various modalities of presence-absence and passivity-activity. He views existential anthropology as crucial for the future of anthropology, emphasizing its importance in distinguishing anthropology from other social sciences. Piette considers the concept of the "minor mode" as an essential element in defining anthropological difference within this framework.

Piette suggests that for detailed observations of human beings, phenomenography may be more suitable than ethnography, which typically concentrates on activities and groups. Phenomenography, focusing on singular individuals, examines movements, postures, gestures, and, as an empirical counterpart to phenomenology, describes states of mind and feelings within the continuity of moments.

Expanding on this perspective, Piette introduces the concept of "volume" to elucidate existential anthropology's emphasis on the human being, which he terms as a "volume of being" or a "human volume." This concept, linked with volumography and volumology, enables him to emphasize the unity, entirety, uniqueness, and stylistic continuity of the human entity.

== Books ==
- Les Jeux de la fête, Paris, Publications de la Sorbonne, 1988.
- Le mode mineur de la réalité : paradoxes et photographies en anthropologie. Louvain-la-Neuve: Peeters. 1992. ISBN 9789068314427.
- Les Religiosités séculières, Paris, PUF, 1993.
- Ethnographie de l'action : l'observation des détails. Paris: Editions Métailié. 1996. ISBN 9782864242147.
- La Religion de près. L'activité religieuse en train de se faire, Paris, Métailié, 1999.
- Détails d'amour ou le lien par l'écriture. Paris: L'Harmattan. 2003. ISBN 9782296312418.
- Le Fait religieux. Une théorie de la religion ordinaire, Paris, Economica, 2003.
- Le temps du deuil : essai d'anthropologie existentielle. Paris: Ed. de l'Atelier. 2005. ISBN 9782708238312.
- Petit traité d'anthropologie, Marchienne-au-Pont, Socrate Editions Promarex, 2006.
- L'Être humain, une question de détails, Marchienne-au-Pont, Socrate Editions Promarex, 2007.
- L'Acte d'exister. Une phénoménographie de la présence, Marchienne-au-Pont, Socrate Editions Promarex, 2009.
- Anthropologie existentiale, Paris, Pétra, 2009.
- Propositions anthropologiques pour refonder la discipline, Paris, Pétra, 2010.
- Fondements à une anthropologie des hommes, Paris, Hermann, 2011.
- De l'ontologie en anthropologie, Paris, Berg International, 2012.
- L'origine de la croyance, Paris, Berg International, 2013.
- Contre le relationnisme. Lettre aux anthropologues, Lormont, Le Bord de l'eau, 2014.
- Méditation pessoanienne. Science de l'existence et destin de l'Anthropologue, Paris, Éditions Matériologiques, 2014.
- Avec Heidegger contre Heidegger. Introduction à une anthropologie de l'existence, Lausanne, Éditions L'Âge d'Homme, 2014.
- What is Existential Anthropology ?, edited with Michael Jackson, New York - Oxford, Berghahn, 2015. ISBN 978-1-78238-636-0
- Existence in the Details. Theory and Methodology in Existential Anthropology, Berlin, Duncker & Humblot, 2015. ISBN 9783428146772
- Aristote, Heidegger, Pessoa : l'appel de l'anthropologie, Paris, Pétra, 2016.
- L'humain impensé, Paris, Presses Universitaires de Paris Ouest (in collaboration with Jean-Michel Salanskis), 2016.
- Antropologia dell'esistenza, Venezia, Alvisopoli, 2016.
- Separate Humans. Anthropology, Ontology, Existence, Milan, Mimesis International, 2016.
- Le volume humain. Esquisse d'une science de l'homme, Lormont, Le Bord de l'eau, 2017.
- Dictionnaire de l'humain (ed. with J.-M. Salanskis et al.), Nanterre, Presses Universitaires de Paris Nanterre, 2018.
- Anthropologie théorique ou comment regarder un être humain, London, Iste Editions, 2018 (translated in English: Theoretical Anthropology or How to Observe a Human Being, Wiley-Iste, 2019).
- Ethnographie de l'action. L'observation des détails, 2nd edition, Paris, Editions de l'EHESS, 2020.
- L'être-cycliste, anthropologie triste, Saint-Guilhem-le-Désert, Editions Guilhem, 2022.
- Anthropologie existentiale, autographie et entité humaine, London, Iste Editions, 2022.
- La religion de près, 2nd edition, Genève, Labor et Fides, 2022.
- Dictionnaire des anthropologies (ed. with M. Lequin), Nanterre, Presses Universitaires de Paris Nanterre, 2022.
- Les jeux de la fête, 2nd edition, Paris, Editions de la Sorbonne, 2023.
- The Routledge International Handbook of Existential Human Science, edited with Huon Wardle and Nigel Rapport, New York - London, Routledge, 2023.
- Existential Art, Learning to Look. An Essay of Radical Anthropology (bilingual version, French & English), Lago (It.), Il Sileno Edizioni, 2024.
- La forme élémentaire de l'être humain. Concepts et dessins pour inventer une science (with C. Beaugrand), Paris, Naima, 2025.

== Online articles and book chapters ==
Directly downloadable on Albert Piette's homepage and on Academia.edu

== A few comments ==
- Special section of Studies in Religion : The Enduring Value’s Albert Piette La religion de près, edited by Frederic Dejean, 53, 4, 2024 (online)
- Benoît Haug, Gwendoline Torterat, Isabelle Jabiot (éds), Des instants et des jours. Observer et décrire l’existence, Paris, Pétra, 2017.
- Concetta Garofalo, L’anthropologia esistenziale di Albert Piette. Ripartie dall’individuo, Dialoghi Mediterranei, 21, September 2016 (online).
- Laurent Denizeau, L'infra de l'humain : Du mode mineur de la réalité à l'anthropologie existentiale dans l'oeuvre d'Albert Piette, Le Philosophoire, 44, 2, 2015, pp. 177–199.
- Catherine Rémy and Laurent Denizeau (éds), La Vie, mode mineur, Paris, Presses des Mines, 2015.
- Yann Schmitt, Refaire de l'anthropologie. Le singulier avant les relations, L'Homme, 214, 2015/2, pp. 137–146.
- Laurent Denizeau, Considering Human Existence: An Existential Reading of Michael Jackson and Albert Piette, in M. Jackson and A. Piette (eds), What is Existential Anthropology?, New York-Oxford, Berghahn Books, 2015, pp. 214–236.
- Stanislas Deprez, The Minor Mode. Albert Piette and the Reshaping of Anthropology, Sociologus, Volume 64, Issue 1, 2014, pp. 87–96.
- Fanny Colonna, Trois monothéismes, une cause commune, ThéoRèmes [Anthropologie des religions], February 2011 (online).
- James A. Beckford, A Minimalist Sociology of Religion?, in J. A. Beckford et J. Walliss (eds), Theorising Religion: Classical and Contemporary Debates, Aldershot, Ashgate Publishing, 2006, pp. 182–196.
