= Jacques Piette =

French politician

Jacques Piette (French pronunciation: [ʒak pjɛt]; 13 May 1916 – 2 April 1990) was a French politician. He was born in Issy-les-Moulineaux. He represented the French Section of the Workers' International (SFIO) in the National Assembly from 1956 to 1958.
