= Bournazel, Aveyron =

Commune in Occitanie, France

Bournazel
- Commune
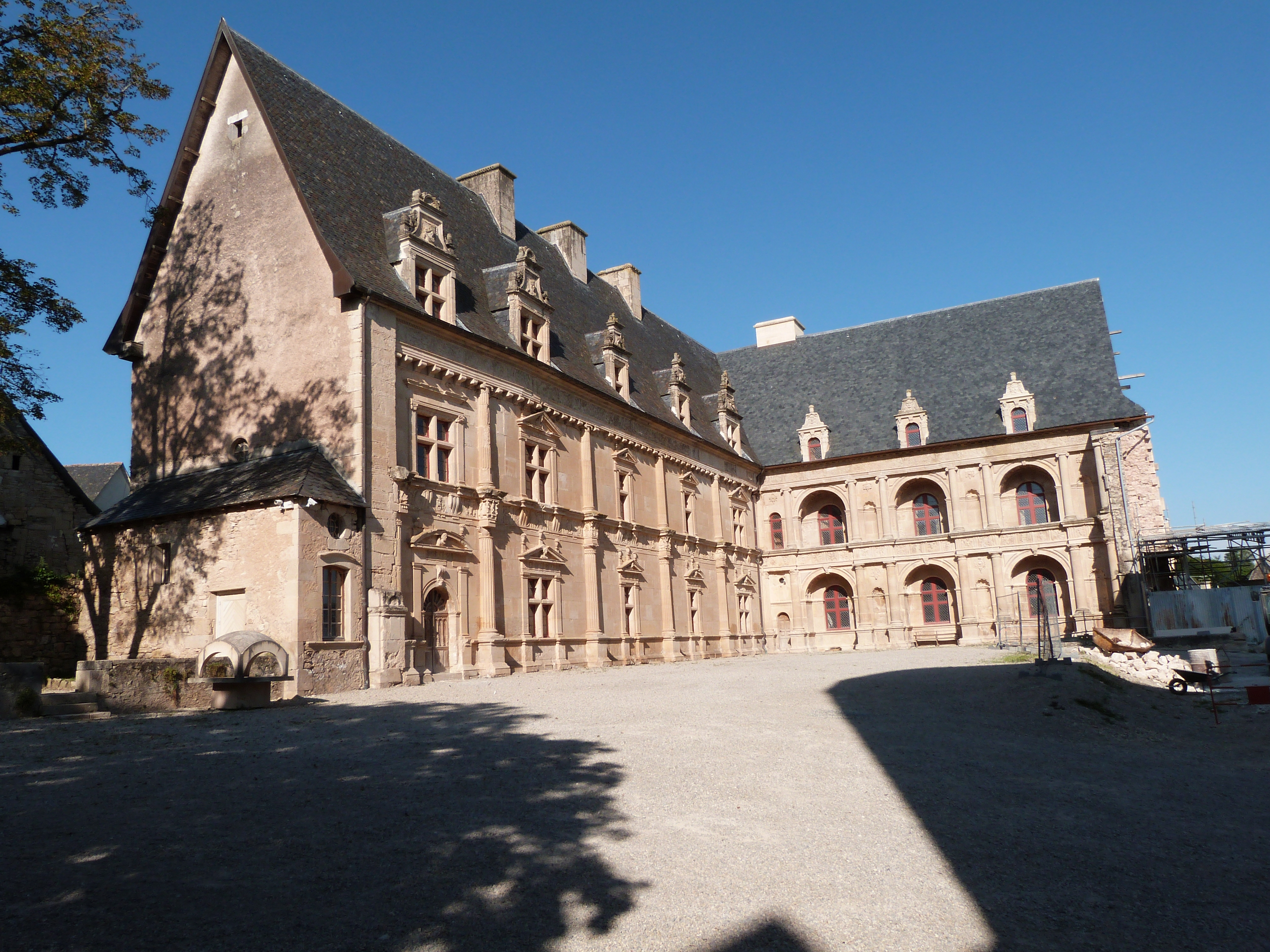
- The Château of Bournazel

- Coat of arms
- Location of Bournazel
- Location within France Location within Occitanie
- Coordinates: 44°27′42″N 2°17′57″E
- Country: France
- Region: Occitania
- Department: Aveyron
- Arrondissement: Villefranche-de-Rouergue
- Canton: Enne et Alzou
- Intercommunality: Pays Rignacois

Government
  - Mayor (2020–2026): Michel Bastide
- Area^{1}: 16.35 km^{2} (6.31 sq mi)
- Elevation: 520 m (1,710 ft)
- Highest elevation: 664 m (2,178 ft)
- Lowest elevation: 340 m (1,120 ft)
- Population (2023): 327
  - Density: 20.0/km^{2} (51.8/sq mi)
- Time zone: UTC+01:00 (CET)
  - Summer (DST): UTC+02:00 (CEST)
- INSEE/Postal code: 12031 /12390
- ^{1} French Land Register data, which excludes lakes, ponds, glaciers > 1 km^{2} (0.386 sq mi or 247 acres) and river estuaries.

Bournazel (French pronunciation: [buʁnazɛl]; Occitan: Bornasèl) is a commune in the Aveyron department in southern France.

== Population ==
Historical population
Year	Pop.	±% p.a.
1968	400	—
1975	378	−0.80%
1982	354	−0.93%
1990	298	−2.13%
1999	246	−2.11%
2007	339	+4.09%
2012	319	−1.21%
2017	348	+1.76%
2023	327	−1.03%
Source: INSEE

== See also ==
- Communes of the Aveyron department
