= Firmi =

Commune in Occitanie, France

- Commune
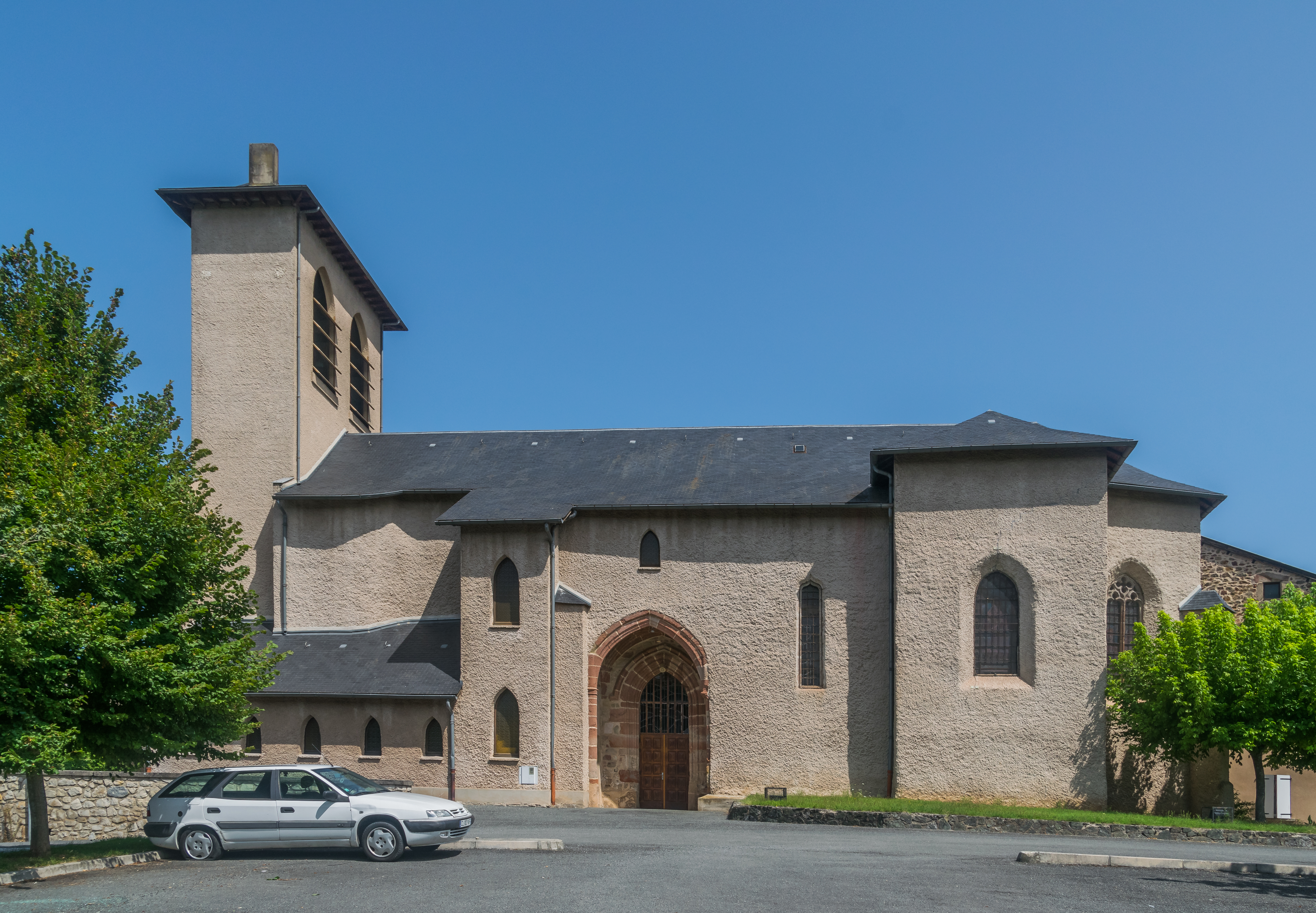
- Church in Firmi
- Location of Firmi
- Location within France Location within Occitanie
- Coordinates: 44°32′28″N 2°18′42″E
- Country: France
- Region: Occitania
- Department: Aveyron
- Arrondissement: Villefranche-de-Rouergue
- Canton: Enne et Alzou

Government
  - Mayor (2020–2026): Jean-Pierre Ladech
- Area^{1}: 29.13 km^{2} (11.25 sq mi)
- Elevation: 330 m (1,080 ft)
- Highest elevation: 620 m (2,030 ft)
- Lowest elevation: 231 m (758 ft)
- Population (2023): 2,318
  - Density: 79.57/km^{2} (206.1/sq mi)
- Time zone: UTC+01:00 (CET)
  - Summer (DST): UTC+02:00 (CEST)
- INSEE/Postal code: 12100 /12300
- ^{1} French Land Register data, which excludes lakes, ponds, glaciers > 1 km^{2} (0.386 sq mi or 247 acres) and river estuaries.

Firmi (French pronunciation: [fiʁmi]; Occitan: Firmin) is a commune in the Aveyron department in southern France.

== Population ==
Historical population
Year	Pop.	±% p.a.
1968	2,667	—
1975	2,862	+1.01%
1982	2,930	+0.34%
1990	2,728	−0.89%
1999	2,556	−0.72%
2007	2,557	+0.00%
2012	2,463	−0.75%
2017	2,393	−0.57%
2023	2,318	−0.53%
Source: INSEE

== See also ==
- Communes of the Aveyron department
