= Cransac-les-Thermes =

Commune in Occitanie, France

- Commune
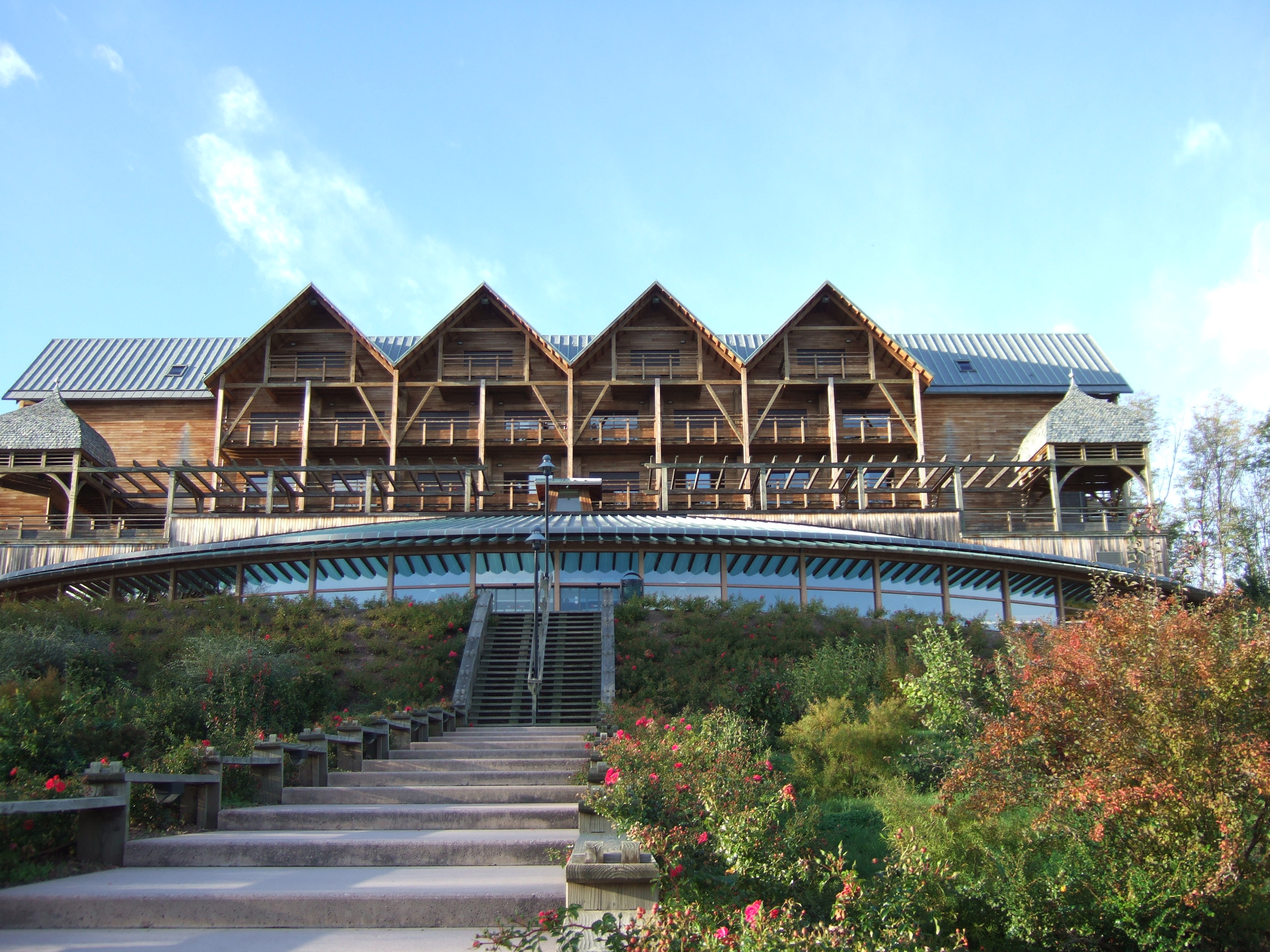
- The thermal baths

- Coat of arms
- Location of Cransac-les-Thermes
- Location within France Location within Occitanie
- Coordinates: 44°31′33″N 2°17′07″E
- Country: France
- Region: Occitania
- Department: Aveyron
- Arrondissement: Villefranche-de-Rouergue
- Canton: Enne et Alzou

Government
  - Mayor (2023–2026): Bernard Canac
- Area^{1}: 6.91 km^{2} (2.67 sq mi)
- Elevation: 277 m (909 ft)
- Highest elevation: 470 m (1,540 ft)
- Lowest elevation: 274 m (899 ft)
- Population (2023): 1,482
  - Density: 214/km^{2} (555/sq mi)
- Time zone: UTC+01:00 (CET)
  - Summer (DST): UTC+02:00 (CEST)
- INSEE/Postal code: 12083 /12110
- ^{1} French Land Register data, which excludes lakes, ponds, glaciers > 1 km^{2} (0.386 sq mi or 247 acres) and river estuaries.

Cransac-les-Thermes (before 2025: Cransac, French pronunciation: [kʁɑ̃sak]) is a commune in the Aveyron department in southern France. Cransac station has rail connections to Brive-la-Gaillarde, Figeac and Rodez.

The town was a coal-mining centre until the mine closed in 1962. Cransac has mineral springs, known in the middle ages. There are iron-mines in the neighbourhood. Hills to the north of the town contain disused coal-mines which have been on fire for centuries. About 8 kilometres (8,000 m) to the south is the fine Renaissance château of Bournazel, built for the most part by Jean de Buisson, baron of Bournazel, about 1545. The barony of Bournazel became a marquisate in 1624.

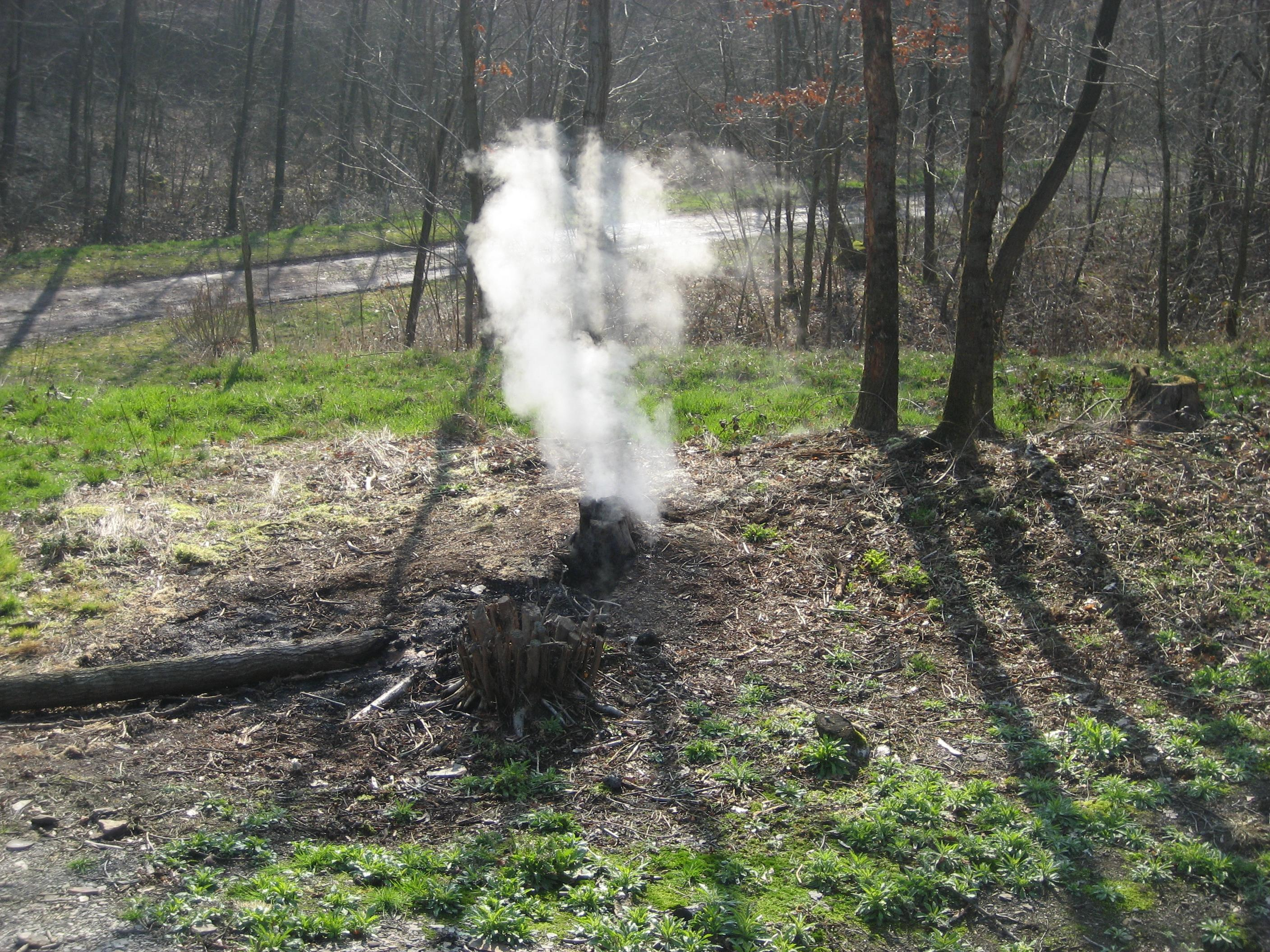
Smoke escaping from the "Burning Mountain"

== Population ==
Historical population
Year	Pop.	±% p.a.
1968	3,244	—
1975	2,870	−1.73%
1982	2,520	−1.84%
1990	2,180	−1.80%
1999	1,821	−1.98%
2007	1,698	−0.87%
2012	1,614	−1.01%
2017	1,508	−1.35%
2023	1,482	−0.29%
Source: INSEE

== See also ==
- Communes of the Aveyron department
