= Balaguier-d'Olt =

Commune in Occitanie, France

- Commune
- Location of Balaguier-d'Olt
- Location within France Location within Occitanie
- Coordinates: 44°31′29″N 1°58′23″E
- Country: France
- Region: Occitania
- Department: Aveyron
- Arrondissement: Villefranche-de-Rouergue
- Canton: Lot et Montbazinois

Government
  - Mayor (2020–2026): Yves Ville
- Area^{1}: 10.84 km^{2} (4.19 sq mi)
- Elevation: 150 m (490 ft)
- Highest elevation: 378 m (1,240 ft)
- Lowest elevation: 152 m (499 ft)
- Population (2023): 179
  - Density: 16.5/km^{2} (42.8/sq mi)
- Time zone: UTC+01:00 (CET)
  - Summer (DST): UTC+02:00 (CEST)
- INSEE/Postal code: 12018 /12260
- ^{1} French Land Register data, which excludes lakes, ponds, glaciers > 1 km^{2} (0.386 sq mi or 247 acres) and river estuaries.

Balaguier-d'Olt (French pronunciation: [balaɡje dɔlt], literally Balaguier of Olt; Occitan: Balaguièr d'Òlt) is a commune in the Aveyron department in the Occitanie region of southern France.

== Geography ==
Balaguier-d'Olt is located some 12 km south-west of Figeac just east of Ambeyrac. The whole north-western border of the commune is the Lot river which is also the departmental boundary between Aveyron and Lot. Access to the commune is by the D86 road from Ambeyrac which follows the river through the village and continues north-east to Capdenac-Gare. The D38 branches off the D86 and crosses the only bridge in the commune across the Lot to Saint-Pierre-Toirac. The D647 branches off the D86 just north of the village and goes south-east to Foissac. Apart from the village there is the hamlet of Vernet-le-Bas in the north of the commune. The commune is mixed forest and farmland.

Geologically the commune is divided into two parts: first the Lot valley which consists of Toarcian marl and secondly the limestone plateau overlooking it.

The Ruisseau de Bournac flows from the north-east and the Ruisseau de Fréjéroque flows from the east both joining in the commune and flowing into the Lot.

== Administration ==
List of Successive Mayors

From	To	Name
1840	1848	Joseph Daube
1848	1860	Pierre Trenty
1860	1868	Jean Louis Obscur
1868	1904	Félix Vernet
2001	2008	Claude Roques
2008	2026	Yves Ville

== Demography ==
The inhabitants of the commune are known as Balaguiérois or Balaguiéroises in French.

Historical population

Year	Pop.	±% p.a.
1793	485	—
1841	619	+0.51%
1872	574	−0.24%
1901	377	−1.44%
1926	251	−1.61%
1946	214	−0.79%
1954	163	−3.35%
1962	113	−4.48%
1968	115	+0.29%

Year	Pop.	±% p.a.
1975	119	+0.49%
1982	160	+4.32%
1990	150	−0.80%
1999	143	−0.53%
2007	142	−0.09%
2012	136	−0.86%
2017	162	+3.56%
2023	179	+1.68%

Source: EHESS and INSEE

== Sites and Monuments ==
The Romanesque Church of Vernet-le-Bas has a bell tower dating from the 12th century and has Romanesque capitals on three sides. Inside the church the Romanesque Altar (12th century) is still preserved in one of the side chapels. It is carved in sandstone decorations and presents interlacing. It is registered as an historical object.

== See also ==
- Communes of the Aveyron department

=== Bibliography ===
- Christian-Pierre Bedel (preface Jacques Dournes), Capdenac Los Aures Asprièras, Balaguier, Bolhac, Causse-e-Diege Foissac, Naussac, Salas, Sonnac / Christian-Pierre Bedel e los estatjants del canton de Capdenac, Rodez, Mission departmental culture, coll. "Al Canton", 1996, ill., cov. ill., 28 cm, 240 pp. ISBN 2-907279-23-8, ISSN 1151-8375, BNF No. FRBNF36688708 (in French)

=== External links ===
- Balaguier-d'Olt on Géoportail, National Geographic Institute (IGN) website (in French)
- Balaguyer on the 1750 Cassini Map
