= Les Albres =

Commune in Occitanie, France

- Commune
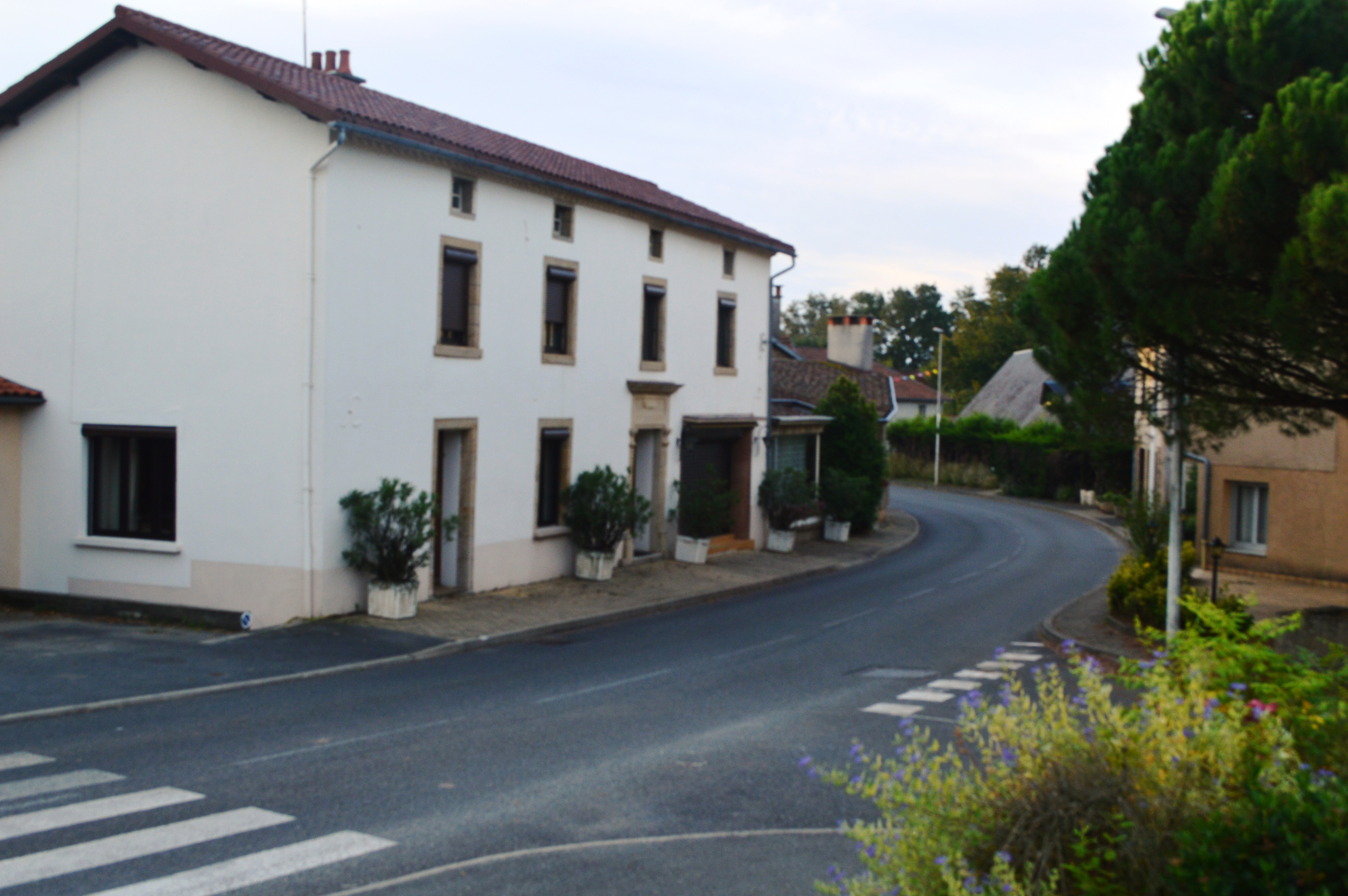
- A street in Les Albres
- Location of Les Albres
- Location within France Location within Occitanie
- Coordinates: 44°32′19″N 2°10′27″E
- Country: France
- Region: Occitania
- Department: Aveyron
- Arrondissement: Villefranche-de-Rouergue
- Canton: Lot et Montbazinois

Government
  - Mayor (2020–2026): Bernard Jonquières
- Area^{1}: 15.22 km^{2} (5.88 sq mi)
- Elevation: 495 m (1,624 ft)
- Highest elevation: 541 m (1,775 ft)
- Lowest elevation: 223 m (732 ft)
- Population (2023): 346
  - Density: 22.7/km^{2} (58.9/sq mi)
- Time zone: UTC+01:00 (CET)
  - Summer (DST): UTC+02:00 (CEST)
- INSEE/Postal code: 12003 /12220
- ^{1} French Land Register data, which excludes lakes, ponds, glaciers > 1 km^{2} (0.386 sq mi or 247 acres) and river estuaries.

Les Albres (French pronunciation: [le.z‿albʁ]) is a commune in the Aveyron department in the Occitanie region of southern France.

== Geography ==
Les Albres is located some 15 km south-east of Figeac and 5 km west of Decazeville. It can be accessed on the D994 road from Asprières in the west, passing through the village and continuing south-east to Montbazens. There is also the D144 small and winding road from Bouillac in the north and the D22 road branching from the D5 in the east and coming to the village via a tortuous route. The commune is mostly farmland with about 30% of the area forested. There are several hamlets other than the village. These are:

- Bor
- Brayes
- Gabriac
- La Bastidie
- La Revelie
- Les Hens
- Les Parras
- Malaret

Numerous streams rise in the commune and mostly flow south-east. The Ruisseau de l'Estang forms the western border of the commune but most of the other streams are unnamed. There are a number of small lakes and ponds scattered through the commune

=== Neighbouring communes and villages ===
Source:

== Administration ==
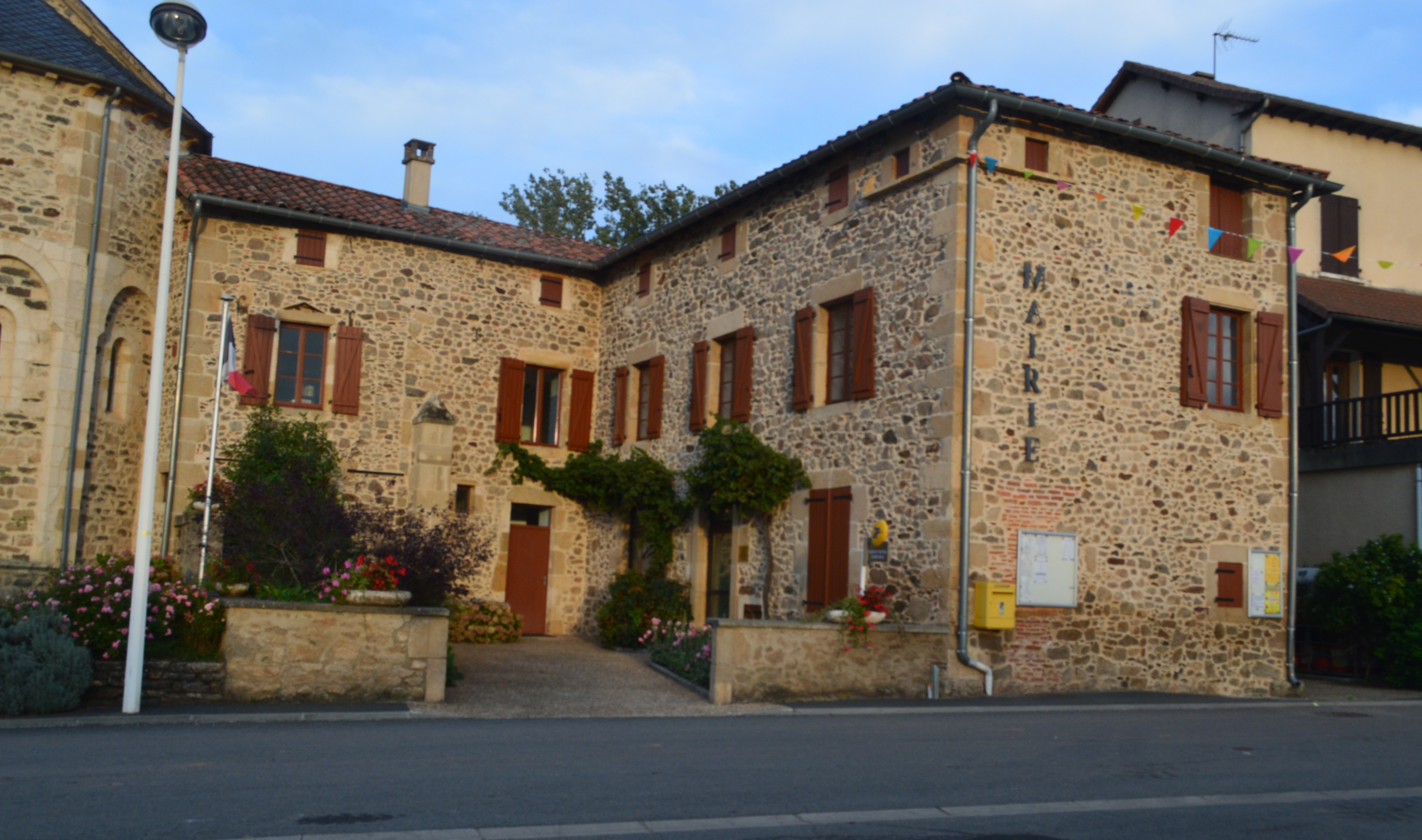
The Town Hall

List of Successive Mayors

From	To	Name
1878	1882	Léon Piales
1882	1904	Jean-Louis Boisse
1904	1929	Justin Boisse
1929	1945	André Alleguede
1945	1971	Georges Combres
1971	1977	Jean-Marie Bousquet
1977	1995	Claude Molieres
1995	2026	Bernard Jonquières

== Demography ==
The inhabitants of the commune are known as Albrégeois or Albrégeoises in French. The commune existed in 1793 but in 1834 joined the commune of Asprières together with Vernet-le-Haut. In 1877 however it was separated again. In 1974 it joined the commune of Viviez but again in 1978 it separated.

Historical population

Year	Pop.	±% p.a.
1793	483	—
1800	501	+0.52%
1881	675	+0.37%
1886	670	−0.15%
1891	658	−0.36%
1896	620	−1.18%
1901	593	−0.89%
1906	608	+0.50%
1911	604	−0.13%
1921	583	−0.35%
1926	542	−1.45%
1931	528	−0.52%
1936	500	−1.08%

Year	Pop.	±% p.a.
1946	480	−0.41%
1954	450	−0.80%
1962	438	−0.34%
1968	418	−0.78%
1975	418	+0.00%
1982	389	−1.02%
1990	342	−1.60%
1999	330	−0.40%
2007	353	+0.85%
2012	331	−1.28%
2017	346	+0.89%
2023	346	+0.00%

Source: EHESS and INSEE

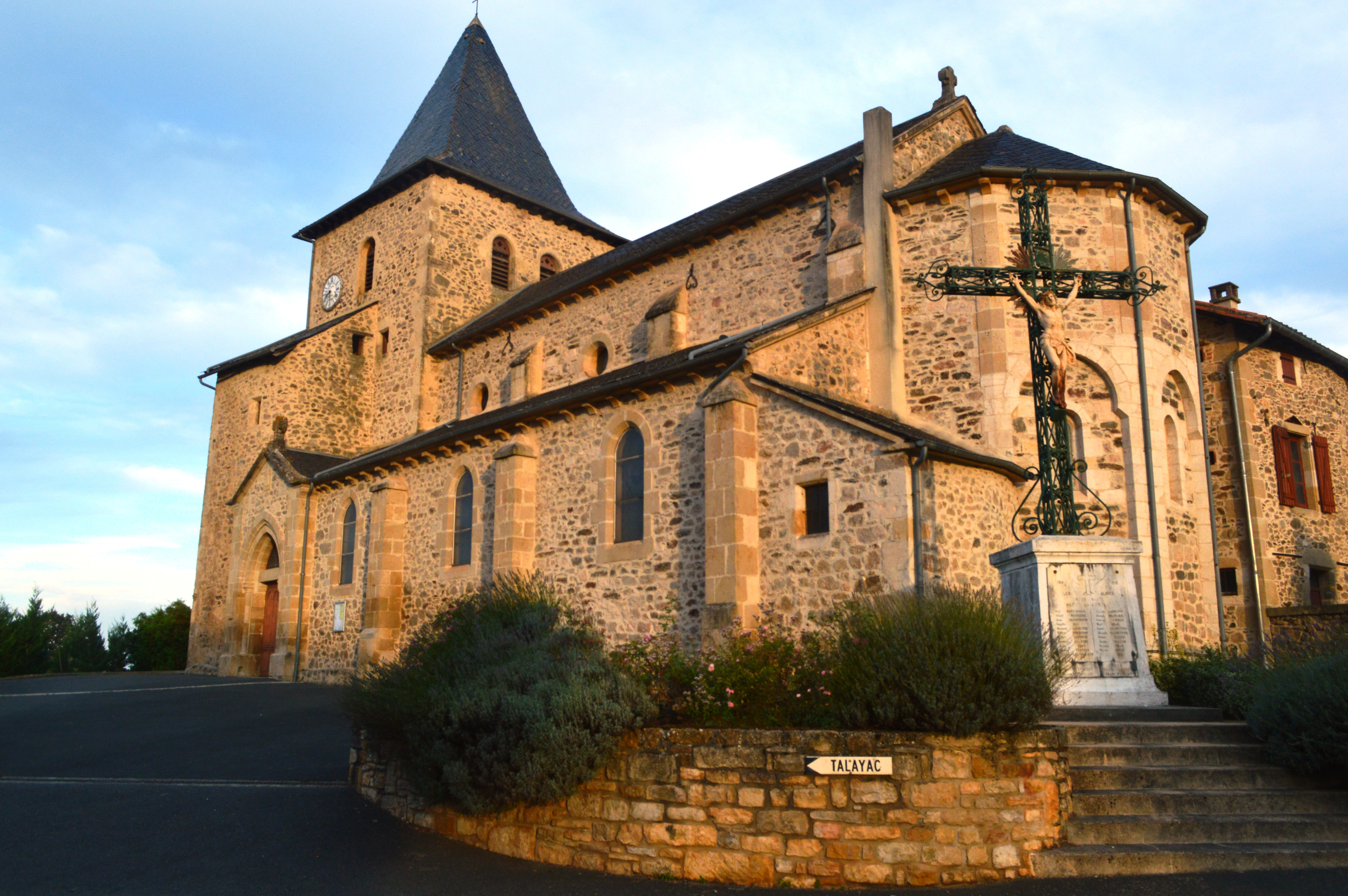
Les Albres Church

== Notable people linked to the commune ==
- Father Augustin Brassac was born in Brayes hamlet in Les Albres commune in 1873 and was ordained a priest in 1896. Described later in the new edition of the Biblical Handbook by Father Vigouroux, Father Brassac was deemed by Rome to be too "modernist". All his writings were blacklisted in 1923. Barred from teaching, he was appointed curate at Saint-Supice and he died in 1941. He was partly rehabilitated in 1943 by the encyclical Divino afflante which authorized the historical-critical method in Catholic theology.

== See also ==
- Communes of the Aveyron department

=== Bibliography ===
- Christian-Pierre Bedel, preface by Jacques Dournes, Capdenac, Los Aures, Asprièras, Balaguièr, Bolhac, Causse-e-Diège, Foissac, Naussac, Salas, Sonnac / Christian-Pierre Bedel e los estatjants del canton de Capdenac, Rodez, Mission départementale de la culture, 1996, A1 canton collection, 240 pages, ill., cov. ill. 28 cm, ISBN 2-907279-23-8, ISSN 1151-8375, BnF 36688708h (in Occitan and French)

=== External links ===
- Les Albres on Géoportail, National Geographic Institute (IGN) website (in French)
- les Arbres on the 1750 Cassini Map
