= Alfredo Stranieri =

Italian-born French serial killer (1956–2025)

- Born: 30 July 1956; Italy
- Died: 10 March 2025 (aged 68); Poissy, France
- Other names: "The Classified Ad Killer" "The Cuckoo"
- Convictions: Murder; Attempted murder
- Penalty: Life imprisonment

Details
- Victims: 4
- Span of crimes: 1997–1999
- Country: France
- Date apprehended: 7 July 1999
- Imprisoned at: 28 February 2003 (22 years)

Alfredo Stranieri (30 July 1956 – 10 March 2025), known as the "Classified Ads Killer", was an Italian-born French criminal and serial killer, who met his victims through classified ads in which he presented himself as a potential buyer of properties or used cars.

Stranieri would kill his victims and appropriate their property. He was sentenced to life imprisonment together with a minimum sentence of 22 years on 28 February 2003 for four murders and one unsuccessful attempted murder. Stranieri had appropriated the property of the two couples he had murdered to use it in fraudulent activities, also trying to kill a man who wanted to sell him a car.

== Crimes ==
=== First double murder ===
Near the end of 1997, Stranieri responded to an ad published by a couple of restaurateurs, Frédéric Adman and his companion Nathalie Girard, who wanted to sell a nightclub in Viry-Châtillon called the New Love. On 7 November 1997, the sale was signed, and six days later, the couple disappeared.

=== Attempted murder ===
On 4 January 1999, Stranieri, under the pseudonym of his first murder victim Frédéric Adman, contacted Simon Cohen through an advertisement for his car. Curiously, without seeing the vehicle or negotiating about its price, Stranieri offered Cohen to finalize the transaction in his restaurant/nightclub New Lover in Viry-Châtillon. When Cohen arrived, Stranieri told him that a friend would come and bring him the check certified by the bank to pay for the car. He then coaxed his victim by offering to visit the premises while waiting for the check, to which Cohen reluctantly agreed.

Stranieri then pulled out a .22 LR Carbine and, in the dim light, fired 5 times at Cohen, but the man managed to escape to the neighbour's house by climbing the fence. The neighbor then called the police, while Stranieri fled. Simon Cohen was transported to the emergency room, where after 4 hours of surgery he managed to survive.

The police opened an investigation into the nightclub's owner and discovered that Alfredo Stranieri already had a criminal record for scams and car trafficking. They then went to his home in Soisy-sur-Seine, where his wife Anne-Marie expected that her husband would arrive early, but never did, and the police lost his trail.

The Cohen case, told in just a few lines in a local newspaper, drew the attention of the Girard couple, whose daughter Nathaliem and her companion Frédéric Adman had disappeared suddenly on 10 November 1997. They were running a restaurant called Oasis in Viry-Châtillon, which had since become New Love.

=== Second double murder ===
In March 1999, in Aveyron, he selected a classified ad for an inn in Naussac called La Bouriatte. The place was to his taste: luxurious and isolated, and the bill was signed on 10 April 1999. Two days later, Nicole Rousseau and Claude Mouly, the two owners who were in the process of a divorce, disappeared. Alfredo, who introduced himself under the name of Mario Stranieri (thanks to the identity card of his brother, which he had borrowed) and claimed to be the manager of a large nightclub in the Paris area, accepted the purchase for 4 million francs without negotiating and moved to Bouriatte, while Rousseau and Mouly mysteriously disappeared.

== Arrest and incarceration ==
Corinne Mouly, worried about not hearing from her father, moved in front of the hostel to spy on Stranieri and alerted the gendarmes. The investigators, under the direction of the commander of the gendarmes in Aveyron, Colonel Gery Plane, then discovered that Stranieri was wanted for the attempted murder of Simon Cohen. "Mario" Stranieri was arrested on 7 July 1999 by the gendarmes in Capdenac. The case was entrusted to the Évry research brigade and teams were deployed to search for the bodies of the deceased in Naussac. On 19 July 1999, the police exhumed the bodies of Girard and Adman in the garden of the New Love nightclub and on the next day, the gendarmes exhumed those of Rousseau and Mouly near La Bouriatte.

Suspected of being an accomplice in his scams, Stranieri's wife Anne-Marie was incarcerated in December 1999.

== List of victims ==
Date of attack	Date of discovery	Identity	Age	Place
13 November 1997	19 July 1999	Frédéric Adman	53 / 56	Viry-Châtillon
13 November 1997	19 July 1999	Nathalie Girard	30	Viry-Châtillon
4 January 1999	4 January 1999	Simon Cohen	31	Viry-Châtillon
12 April 1999	20 July 1999	Claude Mouly	60 / 61	Naussac
12 April 1999	20 July 1999	Nicole Rousseau	55	Naussac

== Trial and sentence ==
Alfredo Stranieri's trial began in the assize court of Essonne on 18 February 2003. He was sentenced to life imprisonment on 28 February 2003, with a 22-year security sentence. The conviction was confirmed in March 2004 by the Créteil Court of Appeals. Stranieri's appeal in 2005 was rejected by the court.

== Life in prison ==
Alfredo Stranieri and Germain Gaiffe both appeared before the 6th Criminal Chamber in Versailles on 11 March 2011 for "disrespect". For months, Stranieri claimed to be the father of the daughter of the former Minister of Justice, Rachida Dati.

This case dates back to September 2010. Stranieri, sentenced to life imprisonment for killing and burying four people in gardens, and Germain Gaiffe, sentenced to 30 years imprisonment for killing and dismembering a man, both posted an identical letter from the Poissy prison, addressed to the hall of the 16th arrondissement of Paris. Both claimed to be the father of Rachida Dati's daughter and enclosed a declaration of paternity. Warned by the prison services, the public prosecutor's office decided to seize the case and prosecute them for "insulting the person in charge of public authority". Dati soon became a civil party. At a hearing, Gaiffe wore a provocative sweater on which "I am the father of Zohra" was written. When questioned, the two men explained that they had shared a moment of intimacy in a room with the minister who came to visit their prison in December 2007, more than a year before she gave birth.

On 17 July 2013, Stranieri married Gaiffe. The wedding, delivered by Frédérik Bernard, mayor of Poissy, took place in the presence of their respective witnesses, the terrorist Carlos the Jackal and the comedian Dieudonné at the Central House of Poissy in Yvelines. Dieudonné had met the two criminals in the prison workshop while writing sketches. Libération commented that it is "unlikely that is a marriage of love", and saw it rather as a "new provocation of the comedian, organized with some comrades".

== Death ==
Stranieri died at hospital in Poissy, on 10 March 2025, at the age of 68.

== Bibliography ==
- Simon Sidney Cohen, Stranieri Case: The Survivor, Rock Edition, 2 January 2003 ISBN 2268044882

== Television documentaries ==
- "Alfredo Stranieri, Thief of Lives" on 17 April 2005, 19 November 2006 and 10 July 2008 in Faites entrer l'accusé, presented by Christophe Hondelatte on France 2.
- "Alfredo Stranieri, the Classified Ad Killer" on 21 October 2007 in Secrets d'actualité on M6, then on 24 June 2009 in Enquêtes criminelles : le magazine des faits divers W9.
- "Deadly Inn" (first report) in Suspect N. 1 on 21 September and 5 October 2012 and on 26 April, 11 and 19 May 2013 on TMC.
- "The Classified Ad Killer" (second report) on 30 November, 7 and 15 December 2013 and 15, 22 and 30 March 2014 in Chroniques Criminelles on NT1.
- "Alfredo Stranieri: The Mythomane Killer", in Affaires criminelles on NT1.
- "The quest for a father", in 13 h 15, le dimanche, on 5 November 2017 on France 2.

== Radio broadcasts ==
- Jacques Pradel, "Alfredo Stranieri, the Classified Ad Killer", broadcast on L'heure du crime on 16 January 2013 on RTL.
- Christophe Hondelatte, "Alfredo Stranieri, the Classified Ad Killer", episode Hondelatte raconte on Europe 1.

== See also ==
- List of serial killers by country
- John Cooper (serial killer)
