= Asprières =

Commune in Occitanie, France

- Commune
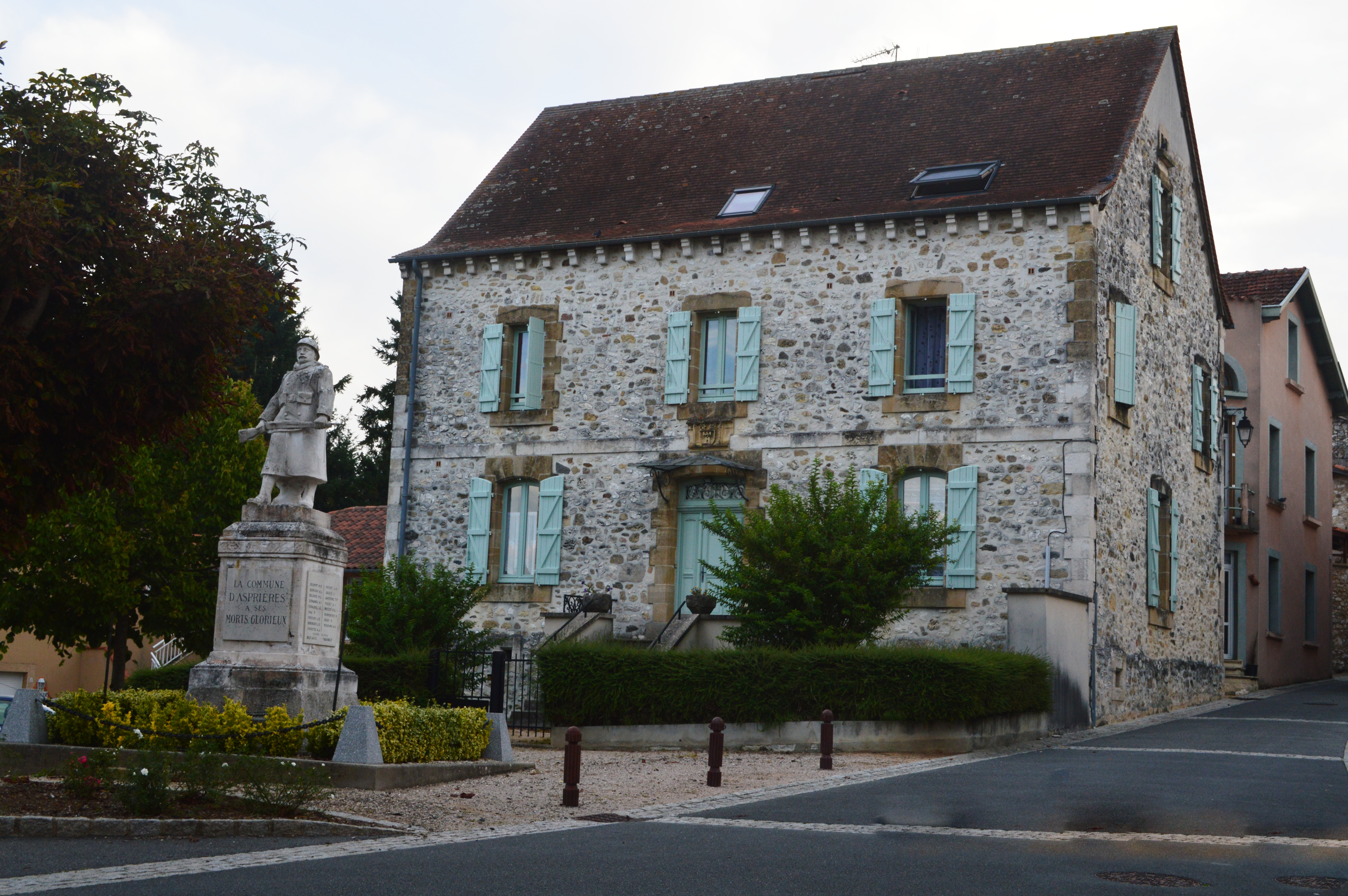
- Asprières War Memorial

- Coat of arms
- Location of Asprières
- Location within France Location within Occitanie
- Coordinates: 44°32′48″N 2°08′44″E
- Country: France
- Region: Occitania
- Department: Aveyron
- Arrondissement: Villefranche-de-Rouergue
- Canton: Lot et Montbazinois
- Intercommunality: Grand-Figeac

Government
  - Mayor (2020–2026): Francis Delous
- Area^{1}: 17.09 km^{2} (6.60 sq mi)
- Elevation: 430 m (1,410 ft)
- Highest elevation: 546 m (1,791 ft)
- Lowest elevation: 167 m (548 ft)
- Population (2023): 753
  - Density: 44.1/km^{2} (114/sq mi)
- Time zone: UTC+01:00 (CET)
  - Summer (DST): UTC+02:00 (CEST)
- INSEE/Postal code: 12012 /12700
- ^{1} French Land Register data, which excludes lakes, ponds, glaciers > 1 km^{2} (0.386 sq mi or 247 acres) and river estuaries.

Asprières is a commune in the Aveyron department in the Occitanie region of southern France.

== Geography ==
Asprières is located some 10 km south-east of Figeac just east of Capdenac-Gare. Access to the commune is by the D40 road from Bouillac in the north-east passing south-west through the heart of the commune and the village and continuing south-west to Salles-Courbatiès. The D994 road from Capdenac-Gare passes down the western border of the commune then east to the village and onwards to Les Albres in the south-east. The tortuous D144 road from Bouillac to Les Albres passes through the neck of the commune in the north-east. A railway runs along the northern border of the commune going east from Capdenac-Gare but there is no station in the commune. The nearest station is in Bouillac. Apart from the village there are the hamlets of Bor, Vernet le Haut, La Coustille, Labrol, Querbes, Paysan, and La Montjouvie - all in the north of the commune - and La Marmiesse east of the village. The commune is mixed forest and farmland with particularly large forests in the north and north-east.

The Lot river forms all of the northern border of the commune with the department of Lot on the other side of the river. The Lot flows from east to west eventually joining the Garonne north of Bordeaux. Several streams rise in the commune and flow north to join the Lot including the: Ruisseau de Prat Rigal, Ruisseau de Querbes, and the Ruisseau de Roucayrol. The Ruisseau de l'Estang forms the south-eastern border of the commune as it flows south-west to join the Ruisseau de Tournac which forms the southern border of the commune as it flows west.

== History ==
In 1790 Asprières was the capital of a canton. In 1922 it lost its status as capital which was transferred to Capdenac-Gare.

=== Heraldry ===
Arms of Asprières	Blazon: Azure, a tower of Argent turreted, masoned in Sable with port of Gules.

== Administration ==
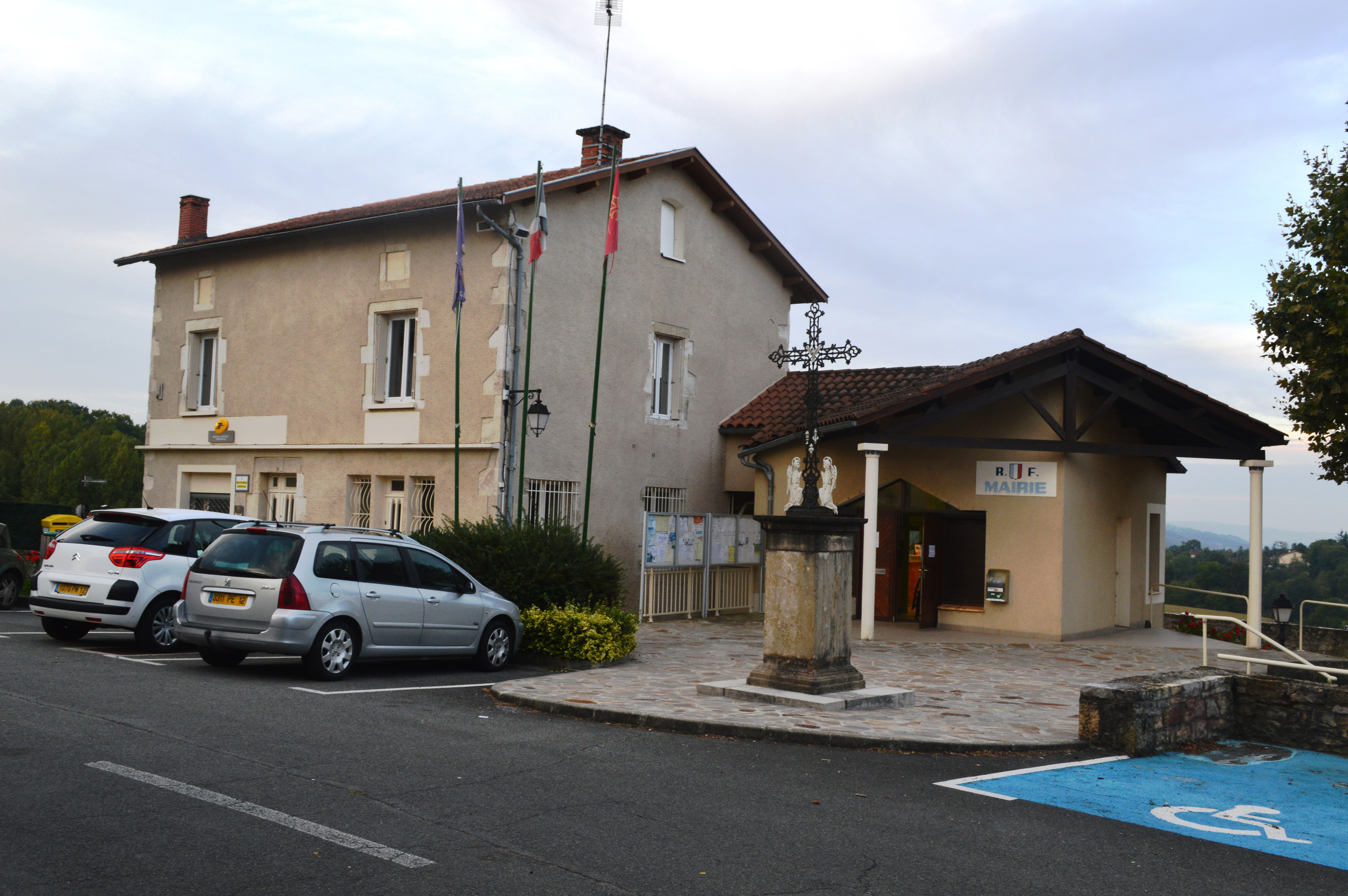
The Town Hall

List of Successive Mayors

From	To	Name
1795	1799	Pierre Frechet
1800	1834	Jean Baptiste Escudie
1834	1838	Joseph Gabriel Raynal
1838	1839	François Escudie
1839	1843	Jean Joulie
1843	1848	Jean Baptiste Andrieu
1848	1848	Augustin Delbies
1848	1852	François Escudie
1852	1871	Jean Baptiste Andrieu
1871	1877	Léon Piales
1878	1892	Auguste Escudie
1892	1896	Victor Aussel
1896	1900	Théophile Gazeau
2001	2008	Robert Marty
2008	2013	Alain Combes
2013	2014	Jean Pierre Cantaloube
2014	2020	Alain Casterot
2020	2026	Francis Delous

== Demography ==
The inhabitants of the commune are known as Aspriérois or Aspriéroises in French.

Historical population

Year	Pop.	±% p.a.
1793	578	—
1800	685	+2.46%
1806	1,418	+12.89%
1821	1,512	+0.43%
1831	1,443	−0.47%
1836	1,459	+0.22%
1841	1,464	+0.07%
1846	1,643	+2.33%
1851	1,620	−0.28%
1856	1,674	+0.66%
1861	1,656	−0.22%
1866	1,821	+1.92%
1872	1,857	+0.33%
1876	1,816	−0.56%
1881	1,193	−8.06%
1886	1,256	+1.03%
1891	1,201	−0.89%
1896	1,088	−1.96%
1901	989	−1.89%

Year	Pop.	±% p.a.
1906	912	−1.61%
1911	896	−0.35%
1921	883	−0.15%
1926	859	−0.55%
1931	774	−2.06%
1936	715	−1.57%
1946	675	−0.57%
1954	678	+0.06%
1962	655	−0.43%
1968	634	−0.54%
1975	650	+0.36%
1982	672	+0.48%
1990	691	+0.35%
1999	707	+0.25%
2007	705	−0.04%
2012	701	−0.11%
2017	733	+0.90%
2023	753	+0.45%

Source: EHESS and INSEE

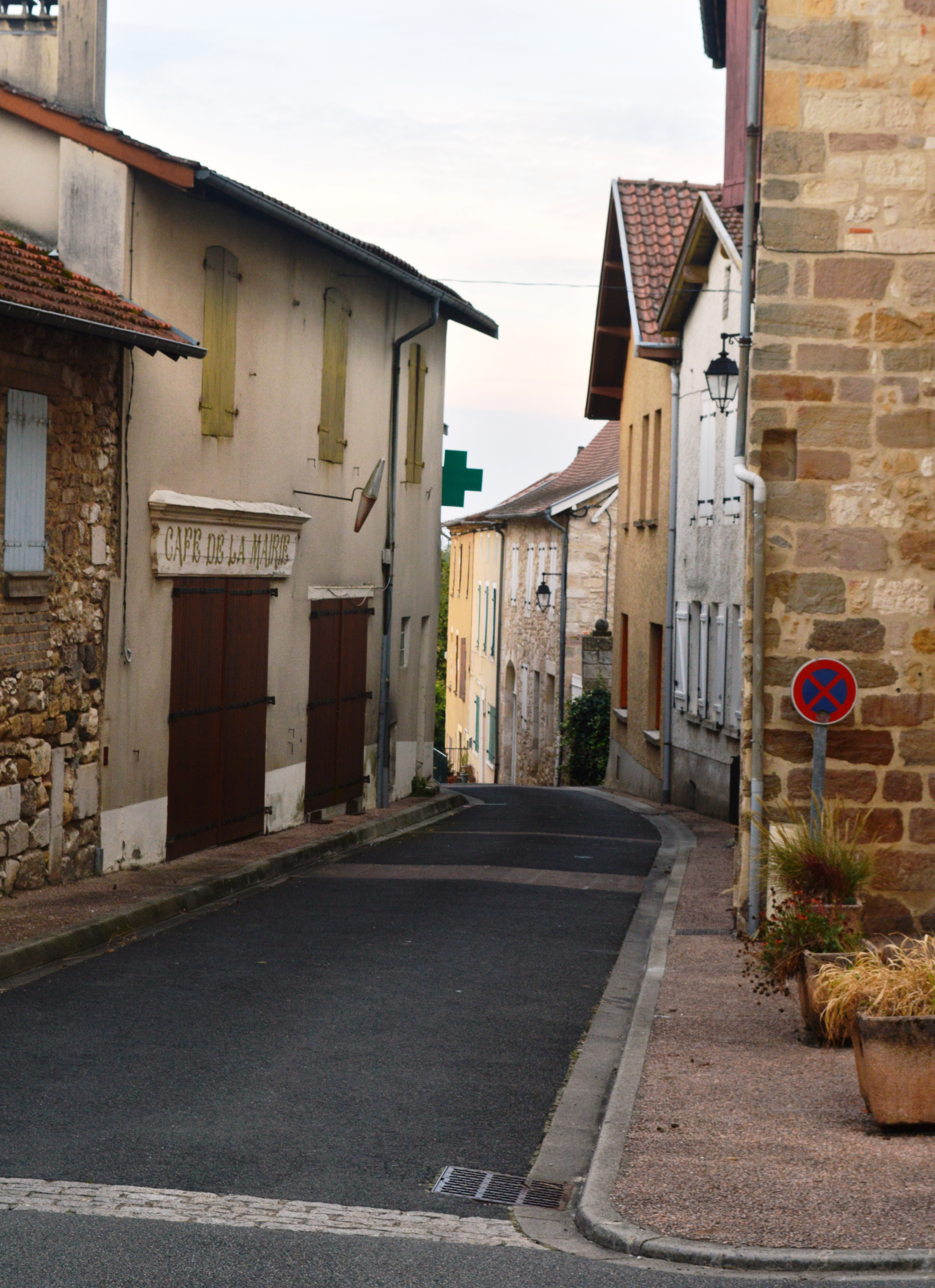
A street in Asprières

== Sites and monuments ==
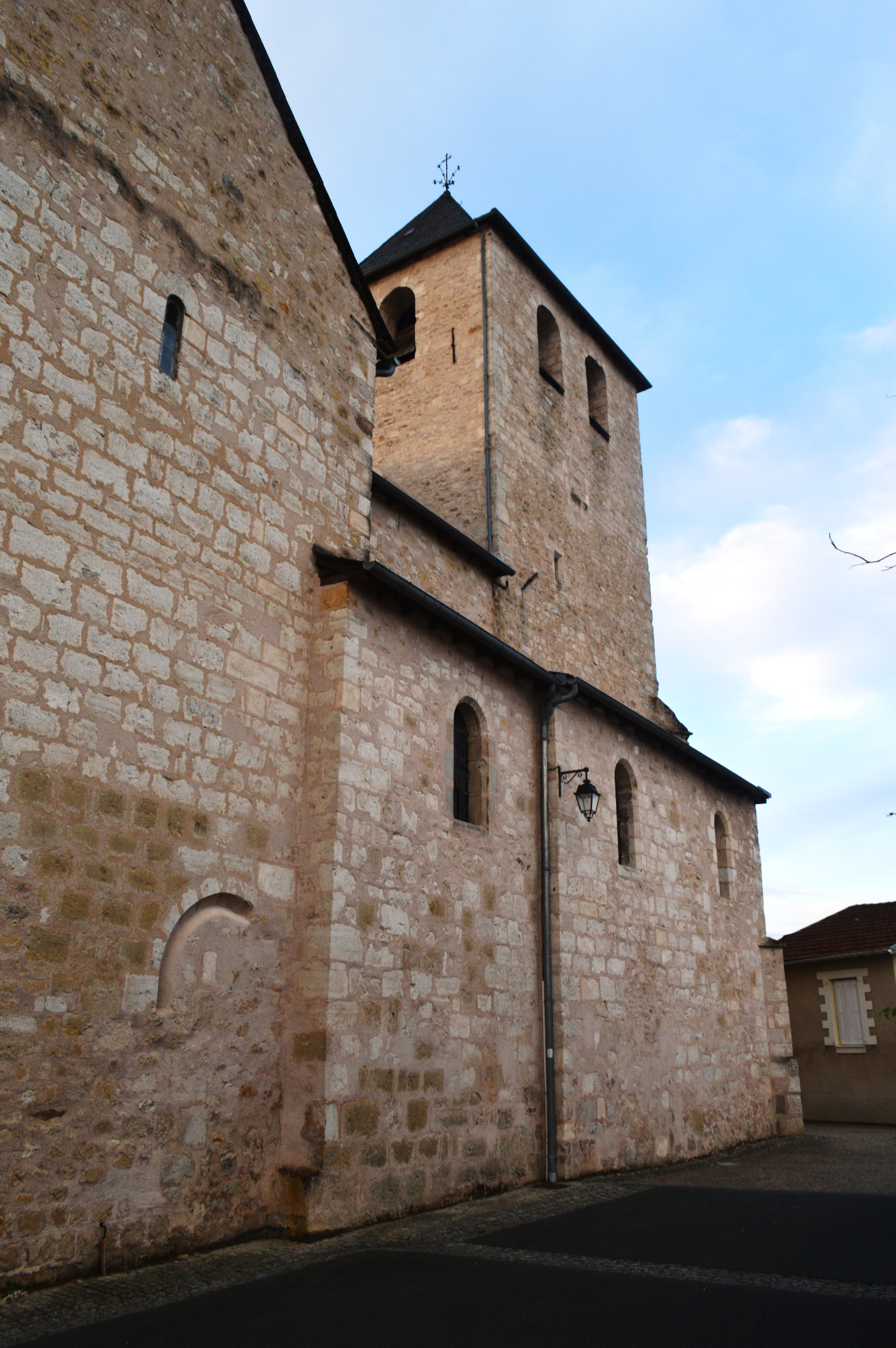
The Church of Saint Martial

In the Parish Church of Saint-Martial is an item registered as a historical object:

- Painting and its frame: The last communion of Saint Jerome (1885)

== Bibliography ==
- Christian-Pierre Bedel, preface by Jacques Dournes, Capdenac, Los Aures, Asprièras, Balaguièr, Bolhac, Causse-e-Diège, Foissac, Naussac, Salas, Sonnac / Christian-Pierre Bedel e los estatjants del canton de Capdenac, Rodez, Mission départementale de la culture, 1996, Al canton collection, 240 pages, ill., cover ill., 28 cm, ISBN 2-907279-23-8, ISSN 1151-8375, BnF 36688708h (Occitan) (in French)

== See also ==
- Communes of the Aveyron department
