= Querbes =

Querbes is a surname, possibly related to the hamlet of Querbes in Asprières, Aveyron, France.

Notable people with this surname include:

- Andrew Querbes (1864-1939), American banker
- Louis Querbes (1793–1859), French priest

== See also ==
- Asprières, Aveyron, Occitanie, France
