= Sonnac =

Sonnac may refer to the following places in France:

- Sonnac, Aveyron, a commune in the department of Aveyron
- Sonnac, Charente-Maritime, a commune in the department of Charente-Maritime
- Sonnac-sur-l'Hers, a commune in the department of Aude
