= Canton of Lot et Montbazinois =

Coordinates: 44.57°N 2.08°E

- Canton
- Situation of the canton of Lot et Montbazinois in the department of Aveyron
- Country: France
- Region: Occitania
- Department: Aveyron
- No. of communes: {{{nbcomm}}}
- Population (2023): 11,927
- INSEE code: 1208

The canton of Lot et Montbazinois is an administrative division of the Aveyron department, southern France. It was created at the French canton reorganisation which came into effect in March 2015. Its seat is in Capdenac-Gare.

It consists of the following communes:

1. Les Albres
2. Asprières
3. Balaguier-d'Olt
4. Bouillac
5. Capdenac-Gare
6. Causse-et-Diège
7. Foissac
8. Galgan
9. Lugan
10. Montbazens
11. Naussac
12. Peyrusse-le-Roc
13. Roussennac
14. Salles-Courbatiès
15. Sonnac
16. Valzergues
