= Peyrusse-le-Roc =

Commune in Occitanie, France

- Commune
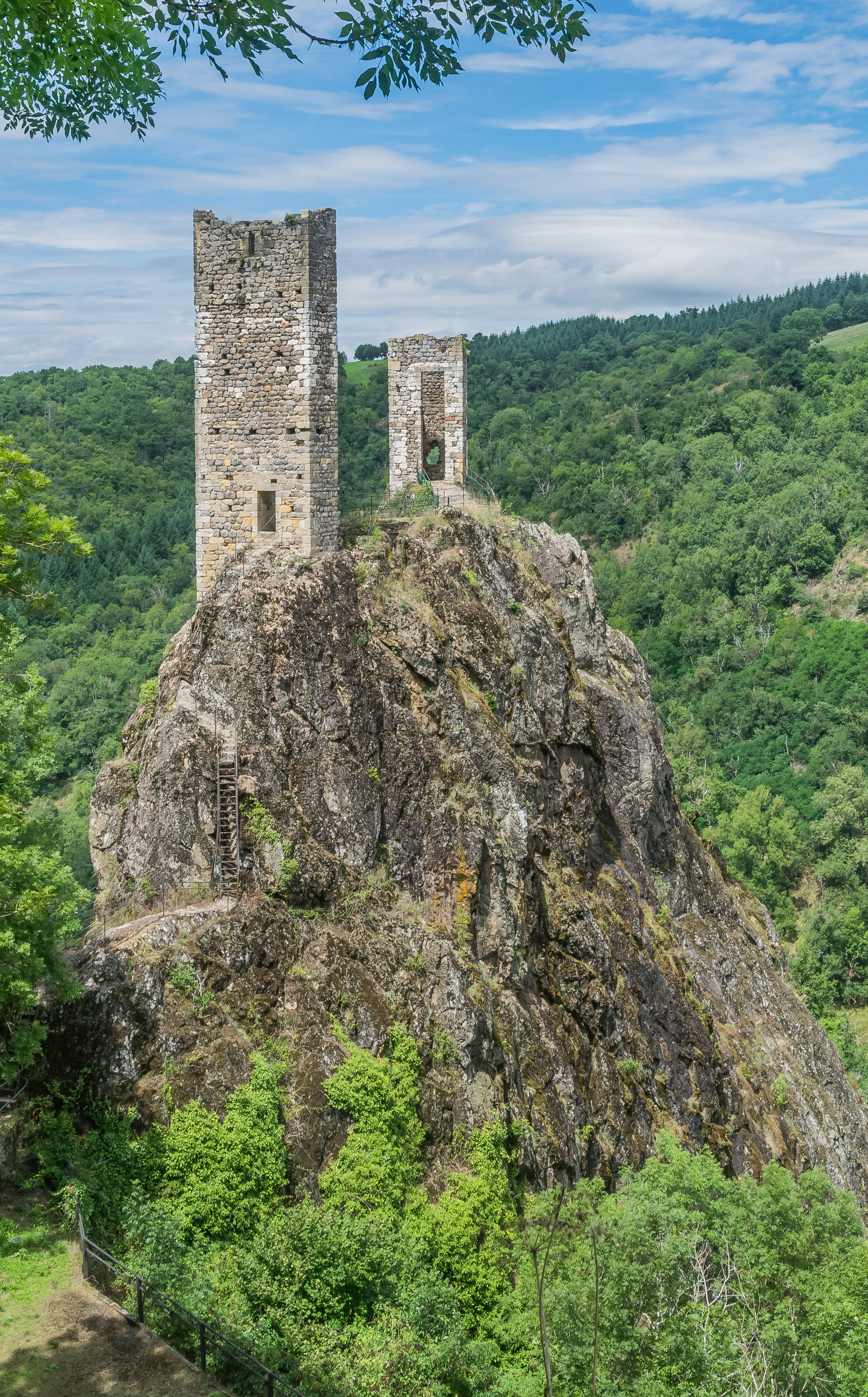
- The towers of Peyrusse-le-Roc

- Coat of arms
- Location of Peyrusse-le-Roc
- Location within France Location within Occitanie
- Coordinates: 44°29′48″N 2°08′29″E
- Country: France
- Region: Occitania
- Department: Aveyron
- Arrondissement: Villefranche-de-Rouergue
- Canton: Lot et Montbazinois
- Intercommunality: Plateau de Montbazens

Government
  - Mayor (2020–2026): Michel Forey
- Area^{1}: 13.81 km^{2} (5.33 sq mi)
- Elevation: 450 m (1,480 ft)
- Highest elevation: 496 m (1,627 ft)
- Lowest elevation: 233 m (764 ft)
- Population (2023): 197
  - Density: 14.3/km^{2} (36.9/sq mi)
- Time zone: UTC+01:00 (CET)
  - Summer (DST): UTC+02:00 (CEST)
- INSEE/Postal code: 12181 /12220
- ^{1} French Land Register data, which excludes lakes, ponds, glaciers > 1 km^{2} (0.386 sq mi or 247 acres) and river estuaries.

Peyrusse-le-Roc (French pronunciation: [peʁys lə ʁɔk]; Occitan: Peirussa) is a commune in the Aveyron department in southern France.

The Château Inférieur is a ruined castle which was taken by the English in 1163 and occupied by Simon de Montfort.

The architectural heritage of the commune includes seven buildings protected under the historical monument act (France): the hospital of the English, registered in 1992, the covered market, registered in 1992, the Synagogue of Peyrusse-le-Roc, registered in 1992, the porte de la Barbacane (Barbican gate), listed in 1993, the Notre-Dame-de-Laval church, listed in 1995, the Château Inférieur, listed in 1995, and the château de La Caze (Peyrusse), registered in 2018.

== Population ==
Historical population
Year	Pop.	±% p.a.
1968	392	—
1975	383	−0.33%
1982	374	−0.34%
1990	288	−3.21%
1999	229	−2.51%
2007	209	−1.14%
2012	221	+1.12%
2017	227	+0.54%
2023	197	−2.33%
Source: INSEE

== See also ==
- Communes of the Aveyron department
