= Lugan, Aveyron =

Commune in Occitanie, France

Lugan
- Commune
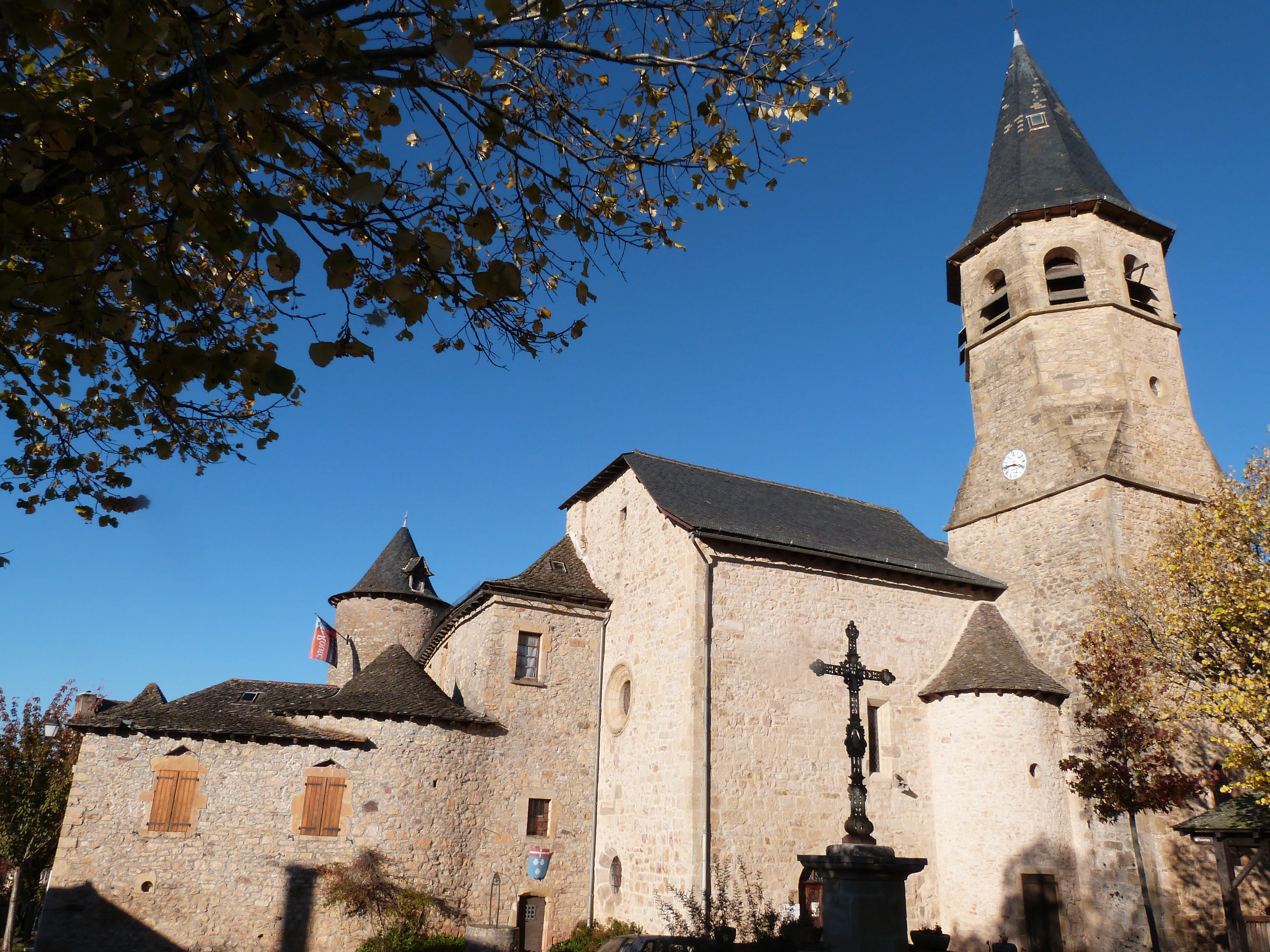
- The commandry in Lugan

- Coat of arms
- Location of Lugan
- Location within France Location within Occitanie
- Coordinates: 44°29′01″N 2°15′34″E
- Country: France
- Region: Occitania
- Department: Aveyron
- Arrondissement: Villefranche-de-Rouergue
- Canton: Lot et Montbazinois
- Intercommunality: Plateau de Montbazens

Government
  - Mayor (2020–2026): Franck Mani
- Area^{1}: 12.61 km^{2} (4.87 sq mi)
- Elevation: 500 m (1,600 ft)
- Highest elevation: 544 m (1,785 ft)
- Lowest elevation: 293 m (961 ft)
- Population (2023): 356
  - Density: 28.2/km^{2} (73.1/sq mi)
- Time zone: UTC+01:00 (CET)
  - Summer (DST): UTC+02:00 (CEST)
- INSEE/Postal code: 12134 /12220
- ^{1} French Land Register data, which excludes lakes, ponds, glaciers > 1 km^{2} (0.386 sq mi or 247 acres) and river estuaries.

Lugan (French pronunciation: [lyɡɑ̃]; Occitan: Luganh) is a commune in the Aveyron department in southern France.

== Population ==
Historical population
Year	Pop.	±% p.a.
1968	414	—
1975	363	−1.86%
1982	337	−1.06%
1990	313	−0.92%
1999	314	+0.04%
2007	326	+0.47%
2012	341	+0.90%
2017	337	−0.24%
2023	356	+0.92%
Source: INSEE

== See also ==
- Communes of the Aveyron department
