= Roussennac =

Commune in Occitanie, France

- Commune
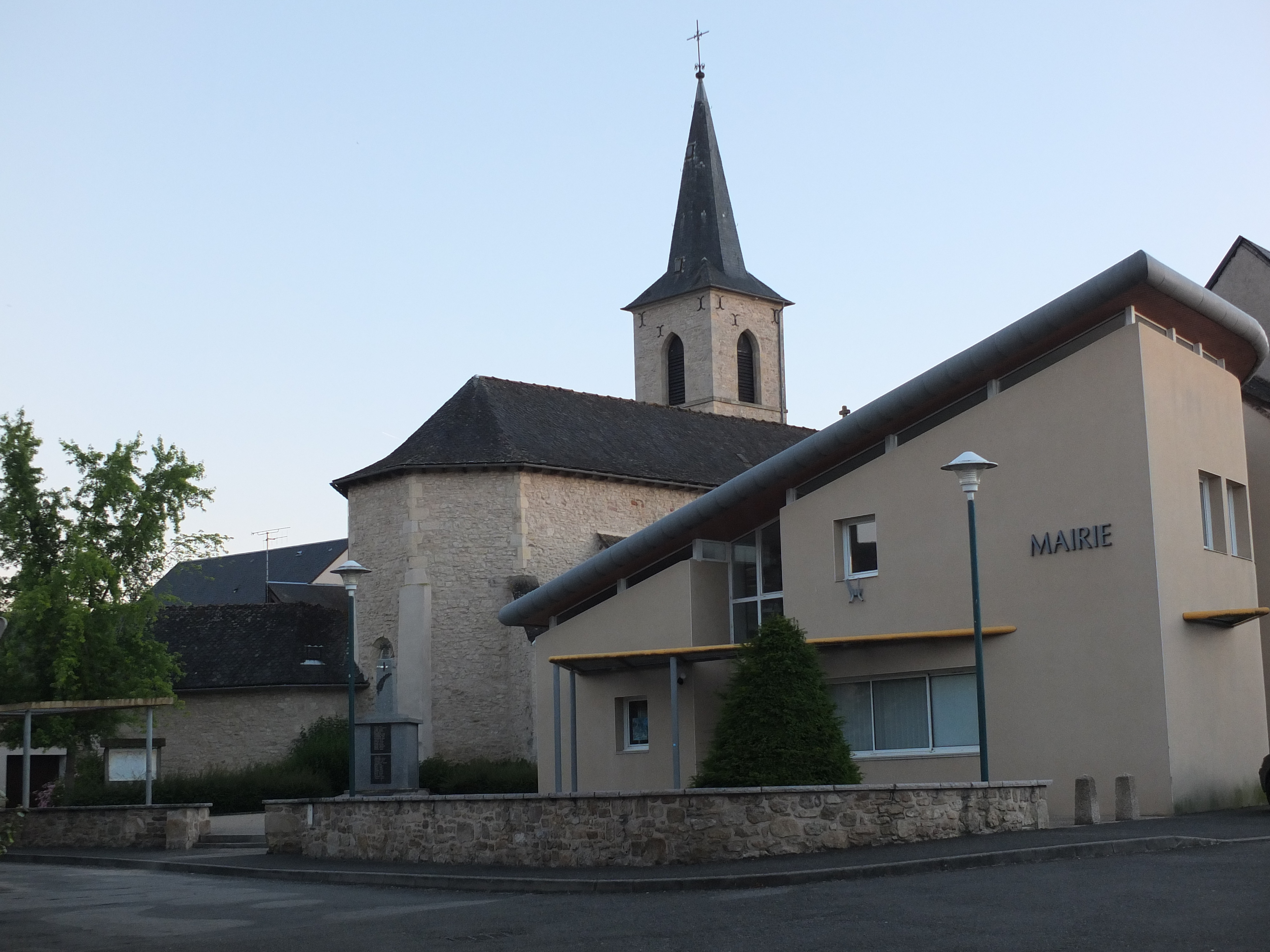
- Town hall
- Location of Roussennac
- Location within France Location within Occitanie
- Coordinates: 44°27′19″N 2°15′11″E
- Country: France
- Region: Occitania
- Department: Aveyron
- Arrondissement: Villefranche-de-Rouergue
- Canton: Lot et Montbazinois
- Intercommunality: Plateau de Montbazens

Government
  - Mayor (2020–2026): Sébastien Cayssials
- Area^{1}: 17.27 km^{2} (6.67 sq mi)
- Elevation: 495 m (1,624 ft)
- Highest elevation: 560 m (1,840 ft)
- Lowest elevation: 464 m (1,522 ft)
- Population (2023): 618
  - Density: 35.8/km^{2} (92.7/sq mi)
- Time zone: UTC+01:00 (CET)
  - Summer (DST): UTC+02:00 (CEST)
- INSEE/Postal code: 12206 /12220
- ^{1} French Land Register data, which excludes lakes, ponds, glaciers > 1 km^{2} (0.386 sq mi or 247 acres) and river estuaries.

Roussennac is a commune in the Aveyron department in southern France.

== Population ==
Historical population
Year	Pop.	±% p.a.
1968	426	—
1975	409	−0.58%
1982	414	+0.17%
1990	427	+0.39%
1999	429	+0.05%
2007	491	+1.70%
2012	548	+2.22%
2017	628	+2.76%
2023	618	−0.27%
Source: INSEE

== See also ==
- Communes of the Aveyron department
