= Château Inférieur =

Coordinates: 44°29′54″N 2°8′20″E

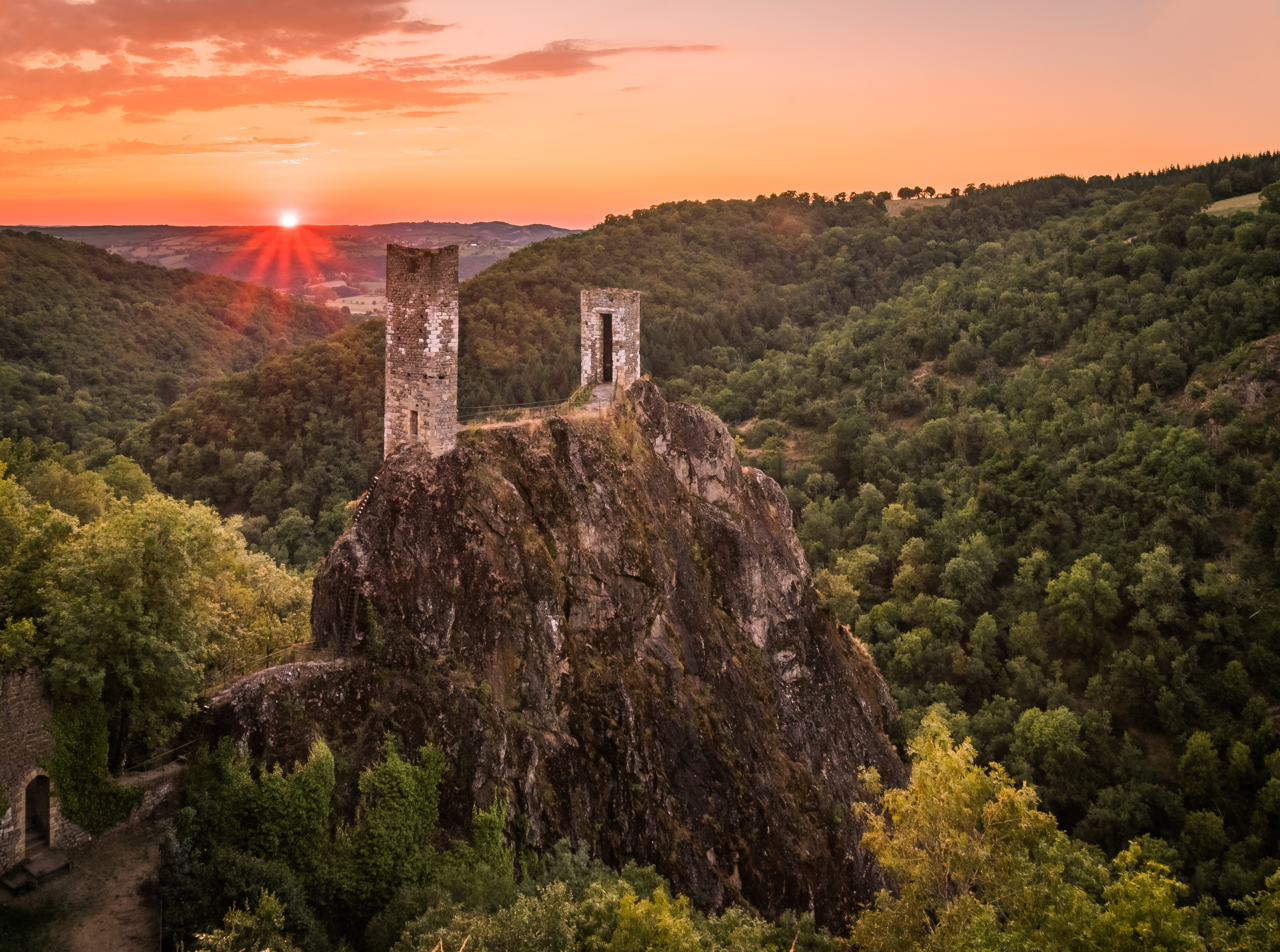
The castle

The Château Inférieur is a ruined castle in the commune of Peyrusse-le-Roc in the Aveyron département of France.

Peyrusse-le-Roc was known during Roman times for the richness of its silver, lead and antimony mines. The fortress here was besieged in 761. It was taken by the English in 1163 and later occupied by Simon de Montfort. The town began to lose its importance from the end of the 16th century. In 1668, the castle was already in ruins. All that remains are two towers; the northern one serving as a watch tower is described by the Ministry of Culture as the finest example in the Rouergue.

The castle is the property of the commune. It has been listed since 1995 as a monument historique by the French Ministry of Culture.

== See also ==
- List of castles in France
