= Capdenac =

- Commune
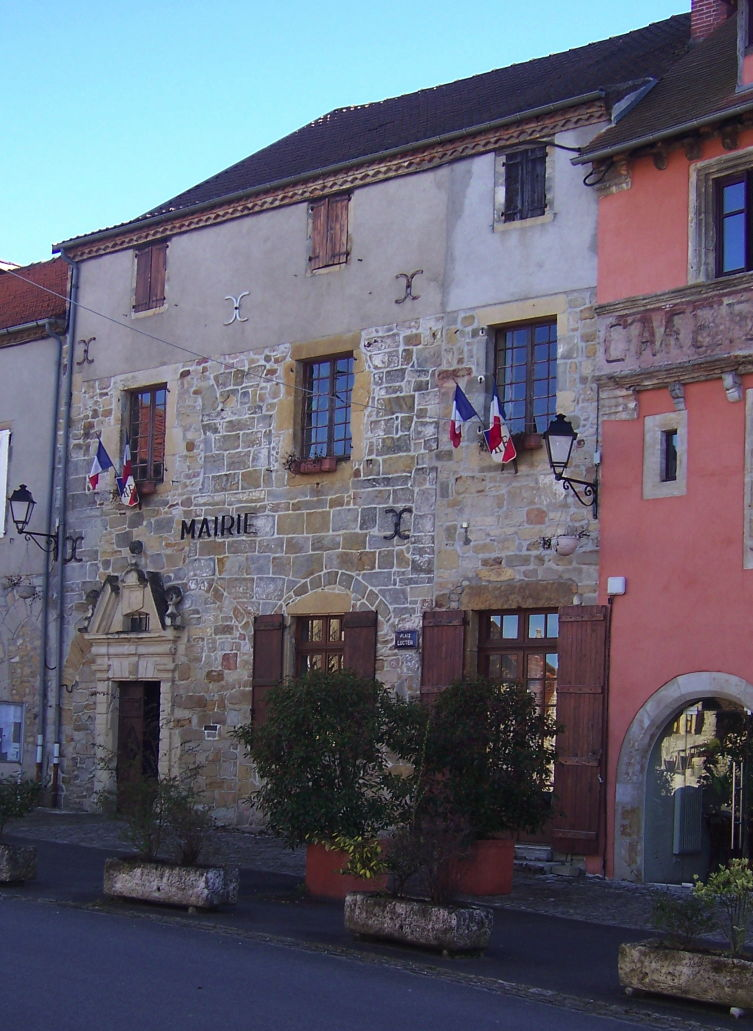
- The town hall in Capdenac

- Coat of arms
- Location of Capdenac
- Location within France Location within Occitanie
- Coordinates: 44°34′54″N 2°04′12″E
- Country: France
- Region: Occitania
- Department: Lot
- Arrondissement: Figeac
- Canton: Figeac-2
- Intercommunality: Grand-Figeac

Government
  - Mayor (2020–2026): Guy Batherosse
- Area^{1}: 10.90 km^{2} (4.21 sq mi)
- Elevation: 298 m (978 ft)
- Highest elevation: 369 m (1,211 ft)
- Lowest elevation: 155 m (509 ft)
- Population (2023): 1,049
  - Density: 96.24/km^{2} (249.3/sq mi)
- Time zone: UTC+01:00 (CET)
  - Summer (DST): UTC+02:00 (CEST)
- INSEE/Postal code: 46055 /46100
- ^{1} French Land Register data, which excludes lakes, ponds, glaciers > 1 km^{2} (0.386 sq mi or 247 acres) and river estuaries.

Capdenac (French pronunciation: [kapdənak]) is a commune in the Lot department in south-western France. It is a member of Les Plus Beaux Villages de France (The Most Beautiful Villages of France) Association.

It has been inhabited since prehistoric times. At one time Capdenac was thought to be identifiable as the Gaulish settlement of Uxellodunum which was besieged by Julius Caesar, but this theory has been discredited.

== Geography ==
The old village of Capdenac is situated on a hill on a ridge which forces a large meander in the river Lot. It is directly west, across the river from the main town of Capdenac-Gare. To the south of Capdenac-Gare is the area of Massip, which is the location of a convent.

== Convent during the Second World War ==
During the Second World War, encouraged by contact with Archbishop Saliège and Monseigneur de Courrège d'Ustou, Sister Denise Bergon arranged for the convent of Notre Dame de Massip in Capdenac (where she was Mother Superior) to shelter some 83 Jewish children at risk due to the Holocaust in France. The children were hidden in the convent's boarding school. Apart from Sister Denise, only Sister Marguerite Roques (nurse and mathematics teacher), together with the school's chaplain and two other sisters knew the truth about the children's religious backgrounds. Another source lists the following in the rescue network: Denise Bergon (Soeur Denise), Jeannette Bettelheim (called Don Quich Jeanne Sicard), Louis de Courrèges d'Ustou (Monseigneur de Courrèges), Georges Garel, Marguerite Roques, and Jules Saliège (Monseigneur Saliège).

== See also ==
- Communes of the Lot department
