= Salles-Courbatiès =

Commune in Occitanie, France

- Commune
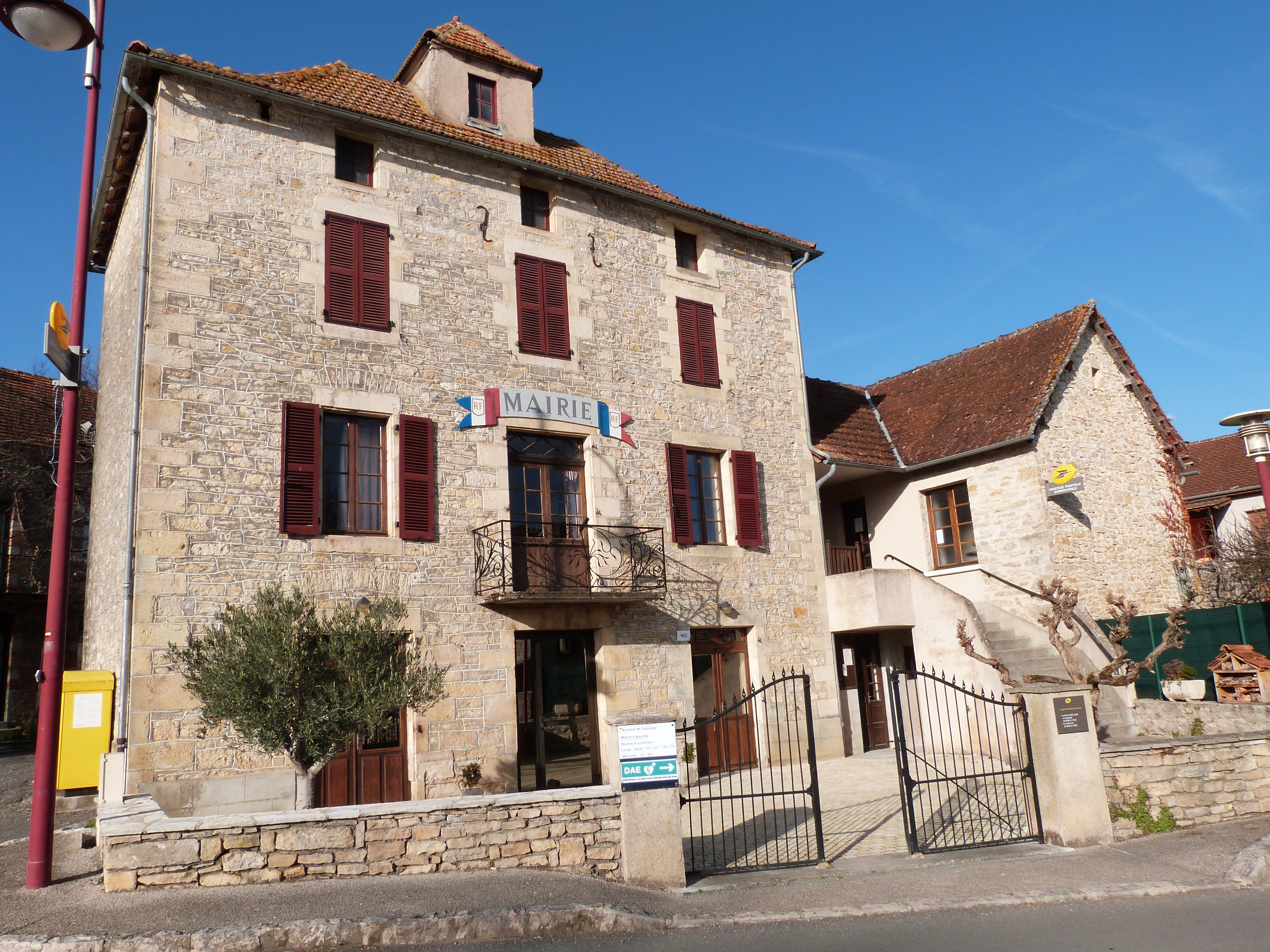
- Salles-Courbatiès Town hall
- Location of Salles-Courbatiès
- Location within France Location within Occitanie
- Coordinates: 44°28′21″N 2°04′42″E
- Country: France
- Region: Occitania
- Department: Aveyron
- Arrondissement: Villefranche-de-Rouergue
- Canton: Lot et Montbazinois

Government
  - Mayor (2020–2026): Pierre Margueritte
- Area^{1}: 13.35 km^{2} (5.15 sq mi)
- Elevation: 278 m (912 ft)
- Highest elevation: 391 m (1,283 ft)
- Lowest elevation: 241 m (791 ft)
- Population (2023): 480
  - Density: 36/km^{2} (93/sq mi)
- Time zone: UTC+01:00 (CET)
  - Summer (DST): UTC+02:00 (CEST)
- INSEE/Postal code: 12252 /12260
- ^{1} French Land Register data, which excludes lakes, ponds, glaciers > 1 km^{2} (0.386 sq mi or 247 acres) and river estuaries.

Salles-Courbatiès (French pronunciation: [sal kuʁbatjɛs]; Occitan: Salas e Corbatièrs) is a commune in the Aveyron department in southern France. Salles-Courbatiès station has rail connections to Toulouse, Figeac and Aurillac.

== Population ==
Historical population
Year	Pop.	±% p.a.
1968	435	—
1975	348	−3.14%
1982	345	−0.12%
1990	354	+0.32%
1999	383	+0.88%
2007	385	+0.07%
2012	408	+1.17%
2017	417	+0.44%
2023	480	+2.37%
Source: INSEE

== See also ==
- Communes of the Aveyron department
