= Naussac, Aveyron =

Commune in Occitanie, France

Naussac
- Commune
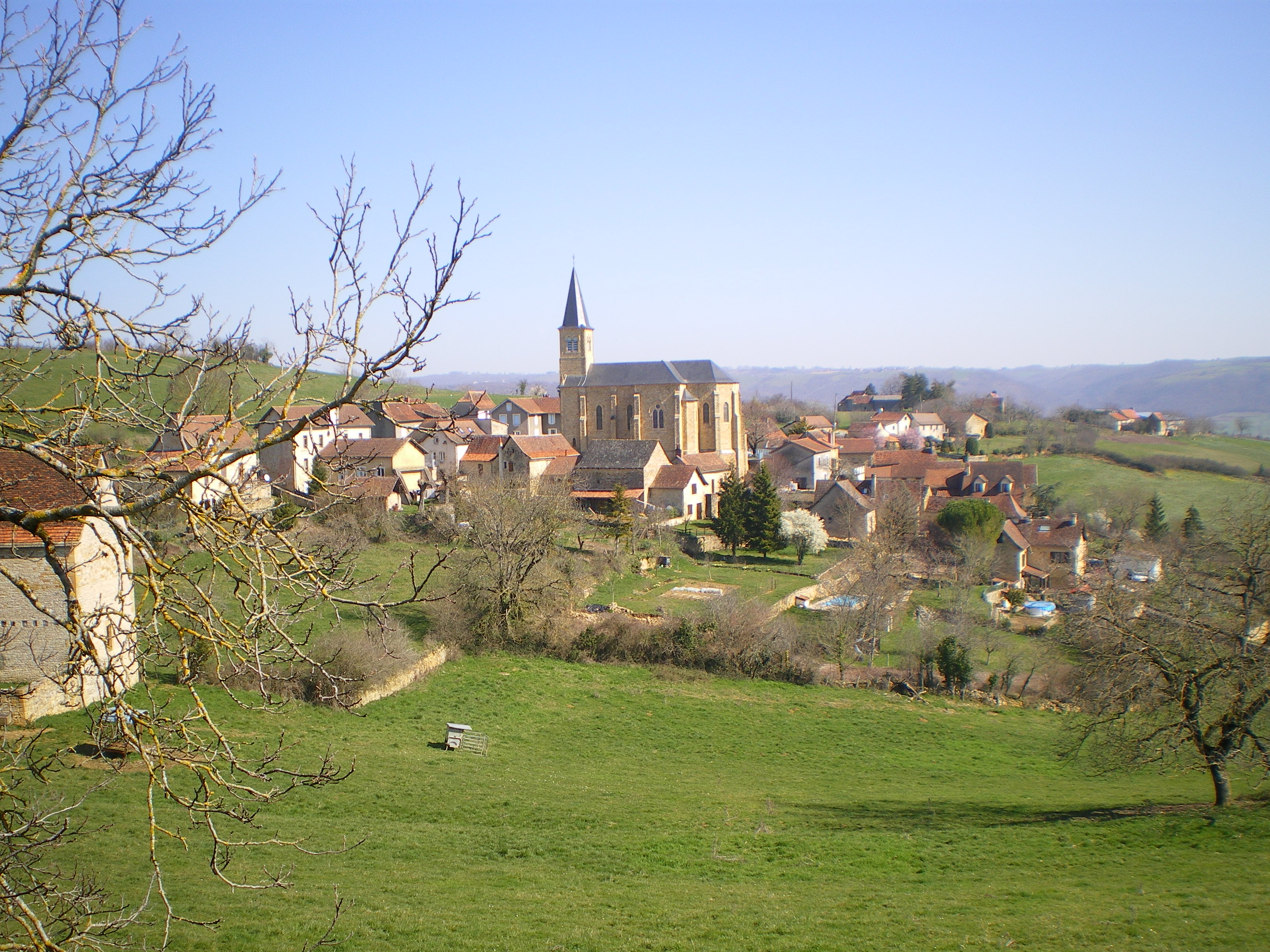
- The church and surrounding buildings in Naussac

- Coat of arms
- Location of Naussac
- Location within France Location within Occitanie
- Coordinates: 44°31′18″N 2°05′41″E
- Country: France
- Region: Occitania
- Department: Aveyron
- Arrondissement: Villefranche-de-Rouergue
- Canton: Lot et Montbazinois

Government
  - Mayor (2020–2026): Didier Pouzoulet-Ligue
- Area^{1}: 14.7 km^{2} (5.7 sq mi)
- Elevation: 247 m (810 ft)
- Highest elevation: 462 m (1,516 ft)
- Lowest elevation: 207 m (679 ft)
- Population (2023): 434
  - Density: 29.5/km^{2} (76.5/sq mi)
- Time zone: UTC+01:00 (CET)
  - Summer (DST): UTC+02:00 (CEST)
- INSEE/Postal code: 12170 /12700
- ^{1} French Land Register data, which excludes lakes, ponds, glaciers > 1 km^{2} (0.386 sq mi or 247 acres) and river estuaries.

Naussac (French pronunciation: [nosak]) is a commune in the Aveyron department in southern France.

== Population ==
Historical population
Year	Pop.	±% p.a.
1968	312	—
1975	274	−1.84%
1982	338	+3.04%
1990	323	−0.57%
1999	296	−0.97%
2007	313	+0.70%
2012	357	+2.67%
2017	373	+0.88%
2023	434	+2.56%
Source: INSEE

== See also ==
- Communes of the Aveyron department
