= Montbazens =

Commune in Occitanie, France

- Commune
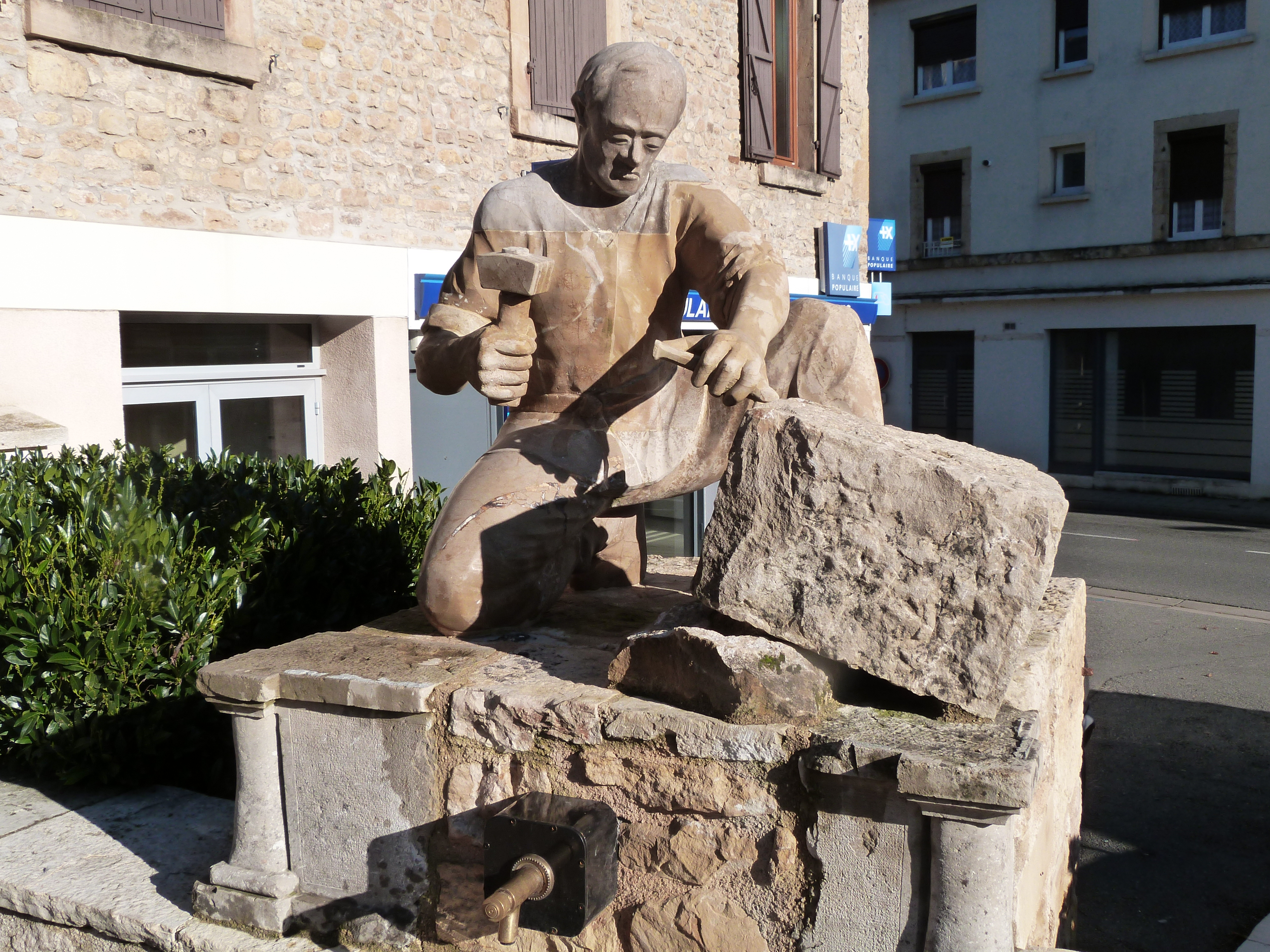
- Sculpture in Montbazens

- Coat of arms
- Location of Montbazens
- Location within France Location within Occitanie
- Coordinates: 44°28′39″N 2°13′47″E
- Country: France
- Region: Occitania
- Department: Aveyron
- Arrondissement: Villefranche-de-Rouergue
- Canton: Lot et Montbazinois
- Intercommunality: Plateau de Montbazens

Government
  - Mayor (2020–2026): Jacques Molières
- Area^{1}: 17.48 km^{2} (6.75 sq mi)
- Elevation: 480 m (1,570 ft)
- Highest elevation: 508 m (1,667 ft)
- Lowest elevation: 340 m (1,120 ft)
- Population (2023): 1,446
  - Density: 82.72/km^{2} (214.3/sq mi)
- Demonym: Montbazinois(e)
- Time zone: UTC+01:00 (CET)
  - Summer (DST): UTC+02:00 (CEST)
- INSEE/Postal code: 12148 /12220
- Website: montbazens.fr
- ^{1} French Land Register data, which excludes lakes, ponds, glaciers > 1 km^{2} (0.386 sq mi or 247 acres) and river estuaries.

Montbazens (French pronunciation: [mɔ̃bazɛ̃]; Occitan: Montbasens) is a commune in the Aveyron department in southern France.

== Population ==
Historical population
Year	Pop.	±% p.a.
1968	1,171	—
1975	1,313	+1.65%
1982	1,424	+1.17%
1990	1,389	−0.31%
1999	1,315	−0.61%
2007	1,311	−0.04%
2012	1,425	+1.68%
2017	1,388	−0.52%
2023	1,446	+0.68%
Source: INSEE

== See also ==
- Communes of the Aveyron department
