= Foissac, Aveyron =

Commune in Occitanie, France

Foissac
- Commune
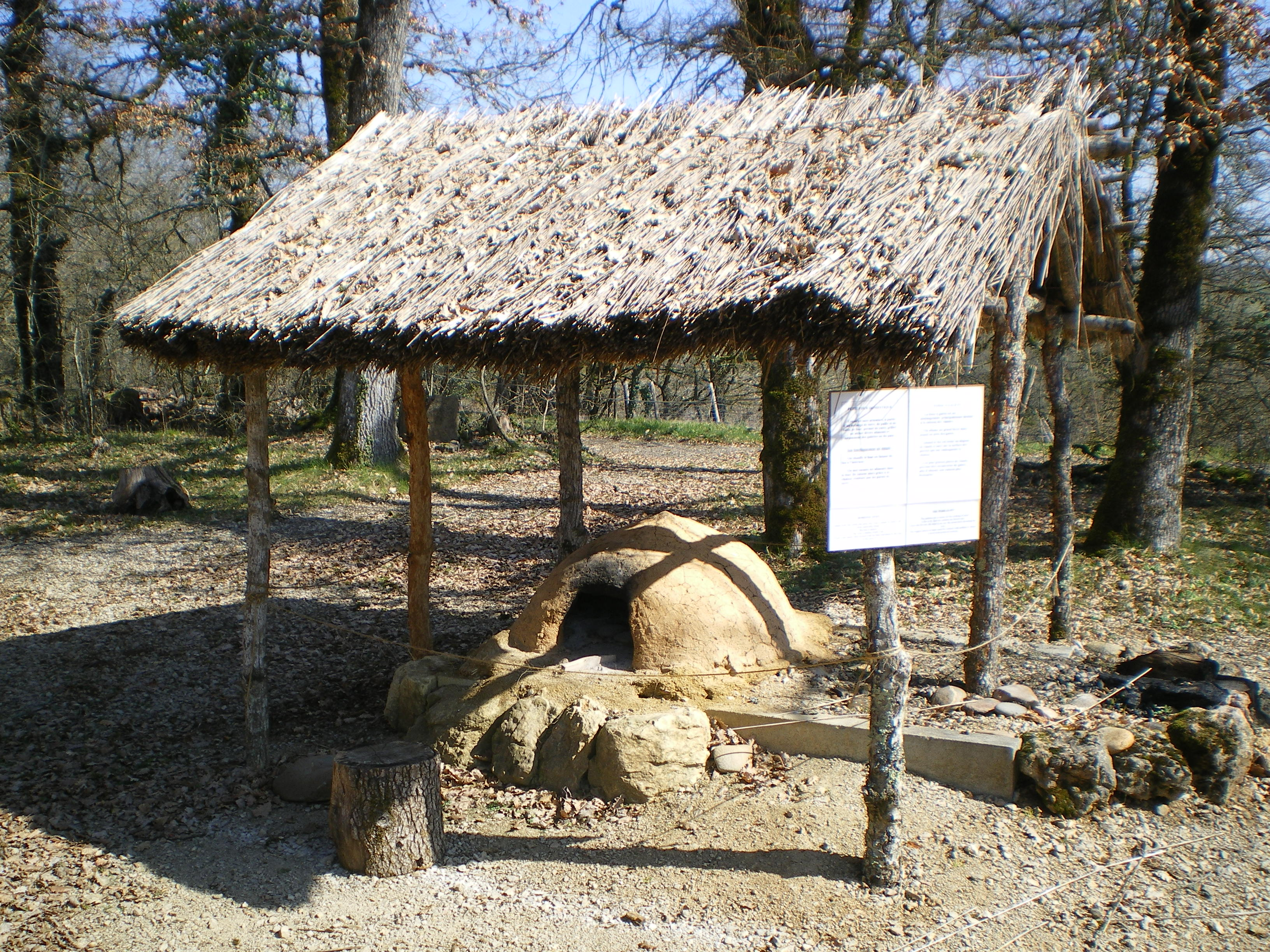
- The prehistoric museum in Foissac
- Location of Foissac
- Location within France Location within Occitanie
- Coordinates: 44°30′43″N 2°00′16″E
- Country: France
- Region: Occitania
- Department: Aveyron
- Arrondissement: Villefranche-de-Rouergue
- Canton: Lot et Montbazinois

Government
  - Mayor (2020–2026): Emmanuel Destruel
- Area^{1}: 9.68 km^{2} (3.74 sq mi)
- Elevation: 320 m (1,050 ft)
- Highest elevation: 383 m (1,257 ft)
- Lowest elevation: 213 m (699 ft)
- Population (2023): 454
  - Density: 46.9/km^{2} (121/sq mi)
- Time zone: UTC+01:00 (CET)
  - Summer (DST): UTC+02:00 (CEST)
- INSEE/Postal code: 12104 /12260
- ^{1} French Land Register data, which excludes lakes, ponds, glaciers > 1 km^{2} (0.386 sq mi or 247 acres) and river estuaries.

Foissac (French pronunciation: [fwasak]) is a commune in the Aveyron department in southern France.

== Population ==
Historical population
Year	Pop.	±% p.a.
1968	275	—
1975	292	+0.86%
1982	320	+1.32%
1990	319	−0.04%
1999	331	+0.41%
2007	413	+2.81%
2012	450	+1.73%
2017	476	+1.13%
2023	454	−0.79%
Source: INSEE

== See also ==
- Communes of the Aveyron department
