= Sonnac, Aveyron =

Commune in Occitanie, France

Sonnac
- Commune
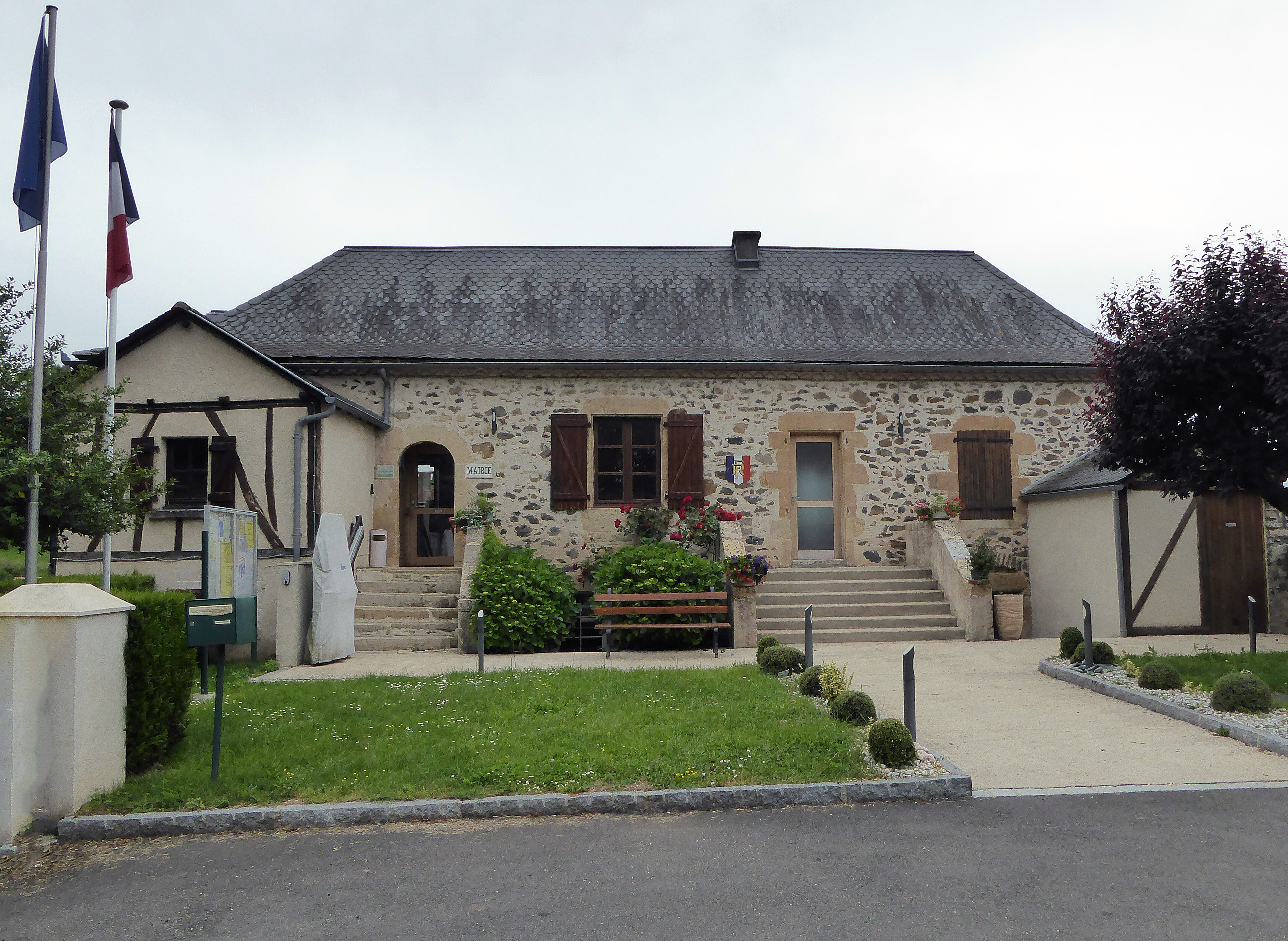
- Town hall

- Coat of arms
- Location of Sonnac
- Location within France Location within Occitanie
- Coordinates: 44°32′57″N 2°06′34″E
- Country: France
- Region: Occitania
- Department: Aveyron
- Arrondissement: Villefranche-de-Rouergue
- Canton: Lot et Montbazinois

Government
  - Mayor (2020–2026): Jérôme Dalmon
- Area^{1}: 11.98 km^{2} (4.63 sq mi)
- Elevation: 430 m (1,410 ft)
- Highest elevation: 467 m (1,532 ft)
- Lowest elevation: 176 m (577 ft)
- Population (2023): 519
  - Density: 43.3/km^{2} (112/sq mi)
- Time zone: UTC+01:00 (CET)
  - Summer (DST): UTC+02:00 (CEST)
- INSEE/Postal code: 12272 /12700
- ^{1} French Land Register data, which excludes lakes, ponds, glaciers > 1 km^{2} (0.386 sq mi or 247 acres) and river estuaries.

Sonnac (French pronunciation: [sɔnak]) is a commune in the Aveyron department in southern France.

== Population ==
Historical population
Year	Pop.	±% p.a.
1968	299	—
1975	267	−1.60%
1982	349	+3.90%
1990	375	+0.90%
1999	388	+0.38%
2007	383	−0.16%
2012	481	+4.66%
2017	518	+1.49%
2023	519	+0.03%
Source: INSEE

== See also ==
- Communes of the Aveyron department
