= Bouillac, Aveyron =

Commune in Occitanie, France

Bouillac
- Commune
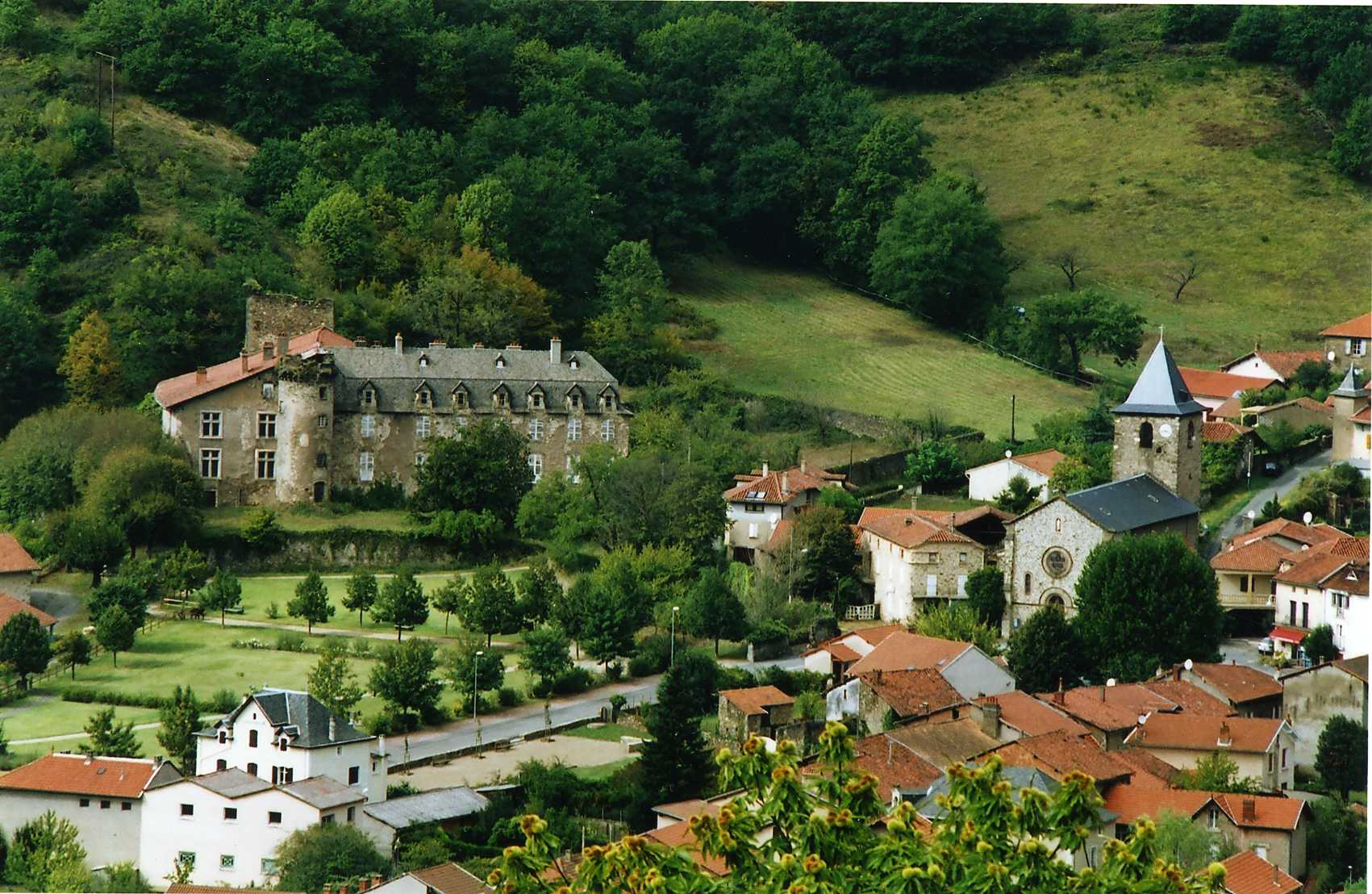
- General view of Bouillac

- Coat of arms
- Location of Bouillac
- Location within France Location within Occitanie
- Coordinates: 44°34′31″N 2°09′49″E
- Country: France
- Region: Occitania
- Department: Aveyron
- Arrondissement: Villefranche-de-Rouergue
- Canton: Lot et Montbazinois

Government
  - Mayor (2020–2026): Gilles Pons
- Area^{1}: 8.2 km^{2} (3.2 sq mi)
- Elevation: 188 m (617 ft)
- Highest elevation: 538 m (1,765 ft)
- Lowest elevation: 161 m (528 ft)
- Population (2023): 375
  - Density: 46/km^{2} (120/sq mi)
- Time zone: UTC+01:00 (CET)
  - Summer (DST): UTC+02:00 (CEST)
- INSEE/Postal code: 12030 /12300
- ^{1} French Land Register data, which excludes lakes, ponds, glaciers > 1 km^{2} (0.386 sq mi or 247 acres) and river estuaries.

Bouillac (French pronunciation: [bujak]; Occitan: Bolhac) is a commune in the Aveyron department in southern France.

== St Martin de Bouillac ==
Saint-Martin-de-Bouillac is part of the commune located on the south bank of the river Lot. A railway station was opened here on 30 August 1858 and closed on 10 December 2006.

== Population ==
Historical population
Year	Pop.	±% p.a.
1968	514	—
1975	520	+0.17%
1982	506	−0.39%
1990	453	−1.37%
1999	426	−0.68%
2007	421	−0.15%
2012	435	+0.66%
2017	414	−0.98%
2023	375	−1.64%
Source: INSEE

== See also ==
- Communes of the Aveyron department
