= Capdenac-Gare =

Commune in Occitanie, France

- Commune
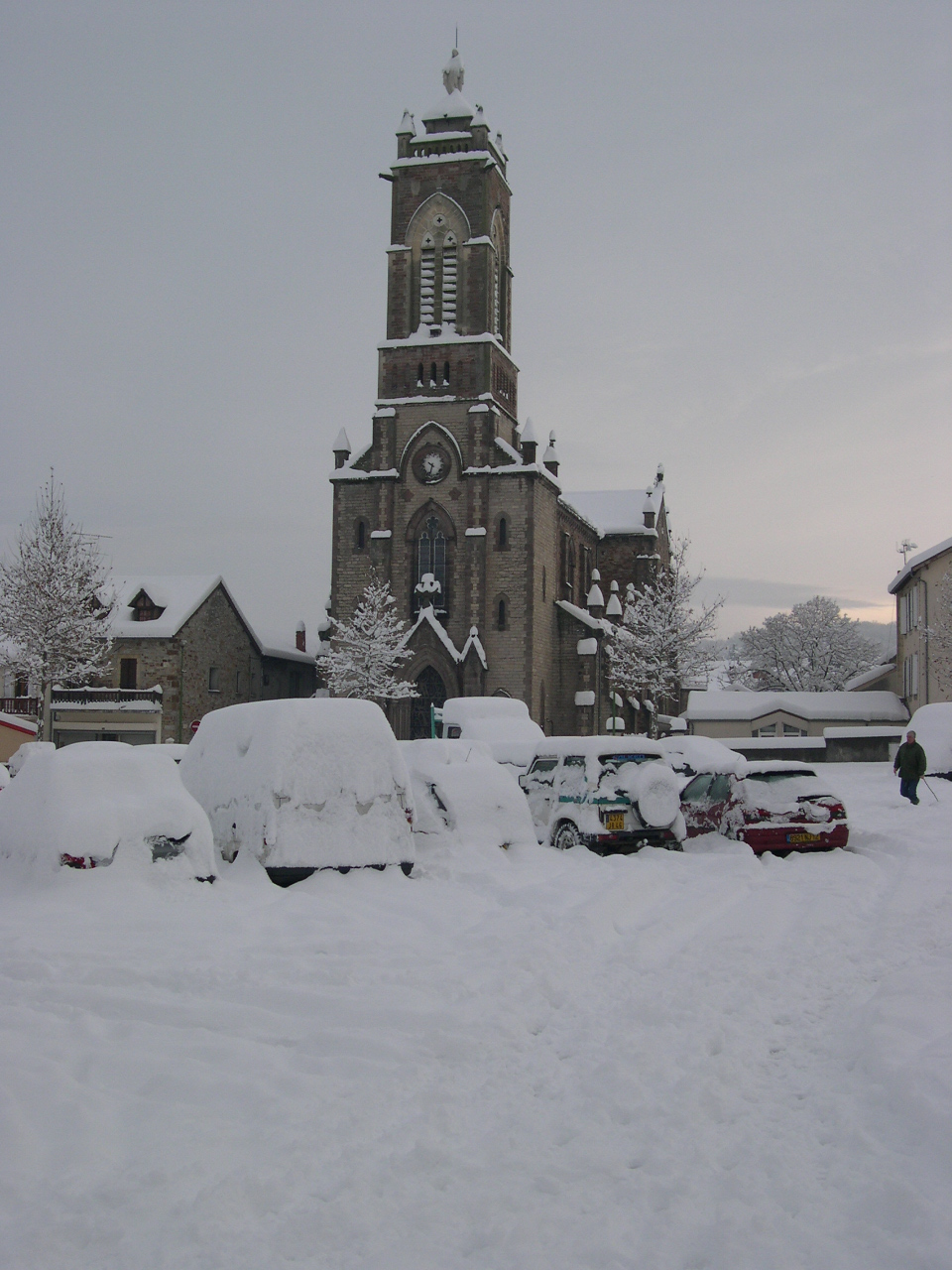
- The church in Capdenac-Gare

- Coat of arms
- Location of Capdenac-Gare
- Location within France Location within Occitanie
- Coordinates: 44°34′21″N 2°04′54″E
- Country: France
- Region: Occitania
- Department: Aveyron
- Arrondissement: Villefranche-de-Rouergue
- Canton: Lot et Montbazinois

Government
  - Mayor (2020–2026): Stéphane Bérard
- Area^{1}: 20.21 km^{2} (7.80 sq mi)
- Elevation: 163 m (535 ft)
- Highest elevation: 421 m (1,381 ft)
- Lowest elevation: 156 m (512 ft)
- Population (2023): 4,440
  - Density: 220/km^{2} (569/sq mi)
- Time zone: UTC+01:00 (CET)
  - Summer (DST): UTC+02:00 (CEST)
- INSEE/Postal code: 12052 /12700
- ^{1} French Land Register data, which excludes lakes, ponds, glaciers > 1 km^{2} (0.386 sq mi or 247 acres) and river estuaries.

Capdenac-Gare (French pronunciation: [kapdənak ɡaʁ]; Occitan: Capdenac Estacion) is a commune in the Aveyron department in southern France. The old village of Capdenac is directly west of Capdenac-Gare, across the river Lot. In the southern outskirts of Capdenac-Gare is the area of Massip.

As the name suggests, Capdenac-Gare is the home to the railway station serving Capdenac.

== Population ==
Historical population
Year	Pop.	±% p.a.
1968	5,937	—
1975	5,840	−0.24%
1982	5,365	−1.20%
1990	4,818	−1.34%
1999	4,587	−0.54%
2007	4,614	+0.07%
2012	4,474	−0.61%
2017	4,505	+0.14%
2023	4,440	−0.24%
Source: INSEE

== See also ==
- Communes of the Aveyron department
