= Marcillac AOC =

Appellation d'Origine Contrôlée for wine in France

Coordinates: 44°28′29″N 2°27′55″E

Marcillac
- Wine region
- Official name: Marcillac
- Type: AOC
- Year established: 1990
- Country: France
- Sub-regions: Aveyron
- Soil conditions: 'rougier' (soil deriving its reddish colour from the iron oxides it contains), but also partly calcereous and to a lesser extent schist
- Total area: 200 ha
- Size of planted vineyards: 161 hectares
- Grapes produced: Fer Servadou or Mansoi, Cabernet Sauvignon and Cabernet Franc

Marcillac (French pronunciation: [maʁsijak]) is an Appellation d'Origine Contrôlée for wine in South West France and is located 20 km to the north-west of Rodez in the Aveyron department. It is located close to the Lot river which flows into Garonne.

== History ==
=== From Antiquity to the Middle Ages ===
This wine-growing area developed under the auspices of the Abbey of Conques over a thousand years ago.

=== Modern period ===
Initially a thriving business, wine production met the needs of the local population. The wines were held in high esteem by the middle classes and by the clergy of Rodez, whose superiors sited their country residence in the wine-growing area. They were also consumed by miners and agricultural workers. However, a public health crisis at the end of the 19th century, the frosts of the early 20th century and the decline of the mines combined to bring down wine production, and it reached its lowest point ever in 1965. It was at this point that a handful of producers decided to take action in order to prevent the wine industry from becoming completely extinct. In 1965 they decided to apply for VDQS status (Vin Délimité de Qualité Supérieure), i.e. the classification immediately below AOC wine, which it was granted under the name Vin de Marcillac. The growers re-landscaped the vineyards, creating terraces in order to allow maximum mechanisation of their work. In 1990 the wine-growing area was granted AOC status under its present name, Marcillac.

== Geographical location ==
This appellation is located to the north-west of Rodez in the Aveyron department. Production is spread across the communes of Marcillac-Vallon, Balsac, Clairvaux-d'Aveyron, Goutrens, Mouret, Nauviale, Pruines, Salles-la-Source, Saint-Cyprien-sur-Dourdou, Saint-Christophe-Vallon and Valady.

=== Geology ===
The vines are planted in red clay soils rich in iron oxide that are known locally as rougiers. The individual plots either cling to steeply sloping hillsides or are cut into terraces. Together they form a kind of amphitheatre that faces due south, ensuring that the grapes ripen well.

=== Climate ===
The climate varies according to the season. In winter it is possible to detect the influence of semi-continental weather patterns, while in summer Mediterranean influences are more apparent. Approximate annual sunshine stands at an impressive 2,200 hours. More often than not, the winters are extremely harsh and the summers very hot and sunny, not dissimilar to those experienced by towns bordering the Mediterranean.

Temperatures for Rodez, which is located next door to the Marcillac wine-growing area:

Month :	Jan.	Feb.	Mar.	Apr.	May	June	July	Aug.	Sept.	Oct.	Nov.	Dec.	Year :
Minimum average monthly temperature (°C)	1	1	3	4	8	12	14	14	11	8	4	2	6.8
Maximum average monthly temperature (°C)	6	7	11	13	17	22	25	25	20	15	9	7	14.8
Precipitation (average height in mm)	36.2	27.0	23.9	43.8	46.0	34.9	22.9	31.1	50.0	60.1	45.1	37.7	38.2
Source: MSN Weather

== Wine-growing area ==
=== Profile ===
The wine is a red wine. In 2004, 8,000 hectolitres of it were produced from 161 hectares (400 acres).

=== Grape varieties grown ===
The main variety grown (90%) is Mansois, the local name for Fer Servadou. The remainder is made up of Cabernets: Cabernet Sauvignon and Cabernet Franc.

=== Terroir and wines ===
This particular red wine tends to be light and fruity, with a predominantly raspberry aroma and is usually drunk within two years of vinification. For a more detailed guide to individual viniculteurs, see Paul Strang (2011) 'South-west France:the wines and winemakers'.

=== Types of wine and gastronomy ===
Marcillac wine is locally often paired with aligot à la saucisse (potato puree mixed with melted cheese, cream and garlic, served with sausage) or tripoux (stuffed sheep's tripe), also with local cheeses such as Roquefort, Cantal, Laguiole, Salers and Rocamadour.
