= Balsac, Aveyron =

Part of Druelle Balsac in Occitanie, France

Balsac
- Part of Druelle Balsac
- Location of Balsac
- Location within France Location within Occitanie
- Coordinates: 44°24′14″N 2°26′45″E
- Country: France
- Region: Occitania
- Department: Aveyron
- Arrondissement: Rodez
- Canton: Vallon
- Commune: Druelle Balsac
- Area^{1}: 15.57 km^{2} (6.01 sq mi)
- Elevation: 577 m (1,893 ft)
- Highest elevation: 606 m (1,988 ft)
- Lowest elevation: 374 m (1,227 ft)
- Population (2017): 631
  - Density: 40.5/km^{2} (105/sq mi)
- Time zone: UTC+01:00 (CET)
  - Summer (DST): UTC+02:00 (CEST)
- Postal code: 12510
- ^{1} French Land Register data, which excludes lakes, ponds, glaciers > 1 km^{2} (0.386 sq mi or 247 acres) and river estuaries.

Balsac (French pronunciation: [balsak]) is a village in the Aveyron department in the Occitanie region of southern France. It was merged into the new commune of Druelle Balsac on 1 January 2017.

== Geography ==
Balsac is located some 10 km north-west of Rodez and 8 km south-east of Saint-Christophe-Vallon, immediately west of Rodez–Marcillac Airport. Access to the commune is by the D598 which branches off the D57 west of the commune and passes through the village continuing to join the D840 south-east of the commune. The D626 goes north-east from the village to join the D840. The commune is entirely farmland.

The Ruisseau des Parranies and its tributary the Ruisseau du Sauvage rise in the south of the commune and flow west then north-west, forming part of the western border of the commune, to join the Ruisseau de l'Ady west of the commune.

== Administration ==
List of Successive Mayors

From	To	Name
1866	1868	Louis Bernat
1868	1874	Auguste Bernat
1874	1881	Théophile Guizot
1881	1888	Adrien Vareilles
1888	1907	Auguste Bernat
1907	1908	Joseph Sanhes
1908	1911	Ernest Mercadier
1911	1912	Etienne Malaterre
1912	1919	Henri Molinier
1919	1925	Théophile Palayret
1925	1935	Casimir Molinie
1935	1945	Etienne Bonnefous
1945	1947	Marcel Palayret
1947	1977	Etienne Bonnefous
1977	1995	François Pons
1995	2008	Alain Gabriac
2008	2017	Daniel Raynal

== Demography ==
The inhabitants of the commune are known as Balsacois or Balsacoises in French.

Historical population

Year	Pop.	±% p.a.
1793	591	—
1800	461	−3.49%
1866	595	+0.39%
1872	569	−0.74%
1876	605	+1.55%
1881	648	+1.38%
1886	633	−0.47%
1891	612	−0.67%
1896	563	−1.66%
1901	536	−0.98%
1906	520	−0.60%
1911	481	−1.55%
1921	434	−1.02%
1926	407	−1.28%

Year	Pop.	±% p.a.
1931	411	+0.20%
1936	402	−0.44%
1946	400	−0.05%
1954	361	−1.27%
1962	346	−0.53%
1968	328	−0.89%
1975	347	+0.81%
1982	407	+2.30%
1990	411	+0.12%
1999	501	+2.22%
2007	573	+1.69%
2012	615	+1.42%
2017	631	+0.51%

Source: EHESS and INSEE

== Sites and monuments ==
There are two sites which are registered as historical monuments:

- The Ruins of the old Priory of Sauvage (13th century)
- The Chateau of Balsac (14th - 16th centuries) belonged to a number of noble families, including the Glandières and the Faramonds, until 1780 when it came into the possession of the Grailhe family of Rodez. During the periods that followed, the chateau was owned by a series of illustrious personages. The Chateau currently operates as a guest house and table d'hote.
- The Parish Church contains three items that are registered as historical objects:
  - A Statue: Virgin and child (15th century)
  - A Statue: Saint Antoine (15th century)
  - A Statue: Saint Foy (15th century)

== See also ==
- Communes of the Aveyron department
