= Marcillac (disambiguation) =

Marcillac is a commune in the Gironde department in southwestern France.

Marcillac may also refer to:

- Marcillac AOC, an Appellation d'Origine Contrôlée for wine from the Aveyron department
- Marcillac-Vallon, a commune in the Aveyron department in southern France
- Marcillac-Lanville, a commune in the Charente department in southwestern France
- Marcillac-la-Croisille, a commune in the Corrèze department in central France
- Marcillac-la-Croze, a commune in the Corrèze department in central France
- Marcillac-Saint-Quentin, a commune in the Dordogne department in southwestern France
- Members of the House of La Rochefoucauld, whose titles include "Prince of Marcillac"
