= Antoine Bernardin Fualdès =

French magistrate (1761–1817)

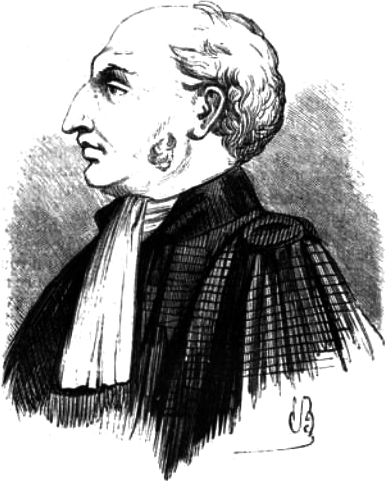
Profile drawing of Antoine Bernardin Fualdes

Antoine Bernardin Fualdès (French pronunciation: [ɑ̃twan bɛʁnaʁdɛ̃ fɥaldɛs]; 10 June 1761 – 19 March 1817) was a French magistrate whose mysterious murder in Rodez created a national political debate, in what was known as the Affaire Fualdès. The murder and the trial were a national and international cause célèbre.

== Biography ==
Fualdès was born in Mur-de-Barrez, the son of Jean-Baptiste Fualdès and Antoinette de Monteilh, Joseph-Bernardin (sometimes named Antoine-Bernardin). Belonging to a family belonging to the noblesse de robe in the pre-revolutionary France, Fualdès had access to a legal education. Having completed his studies by the time the French Revolution erupted, he gained credentials as a moderate Jacobin, serving as defence lawyer for General Custine and even participating in the defense of Charlotte Corday. He obtained appointments in Rodez under subsequent administrations, including under Napoleon, but was forced to retire upon the restoration of the Monarchy.

The events surrounding his murder created a luridly baroque story: his corpse was found floating in the Aveyron river. The accused were said to have lured the former prosecutor to a hotel and shrouded his cries during the murder with the loud sounds of an organ grinder. Initially the motives appeared political: Fualdès was a former Bonapartist and revolutionary; his assassins were royalists. But the trial became a spectacle and had immense press coverage. A first trial locally was cancelled and moved to Albi. Witnesses to the events continued to multiply and now incorporate members of a lower-class family that hosted a nearby gambling den. The young children of this family are brought to testify of bizarre events. One famous "witness", Marie-Francois Clarisse Enraljand (Clarisse Manson), daughter of a presiding judge of the provost court of Aveyron who supervised the case, took the stand to accuse her lover Lieutenant Clémendot, an officer of the Rodez garrison of witnessing the murder. Her testimony was often contradictory, and she had a habit of fainting at poignant moments. In the end some of the accused were convicted by 1818.

Subsequently, the events and the trials have provided fodder for authors from Honoré de Balzac, Gustave Flaubert, Victor Hugo (who mentions the trial in Les Misérables), Anatole France, and many others. Some creating dramatic works, others writing about the events, and theories regarding the events. There is even a semi-autobiographical Memoirs of Madame Manson.

== Bibliography ==
- Michel Louis Rouquette, La Rumeur et le Meurtre. L'affaire Fualdès, Paris, PUF, collection Sociologie Today, 1992, ISBN 9782130445036, 110 p.
- Marie-Françoise-Clarisse Manson née Enjalran, Memoirs of Madame Manson, explanations of her conduct, in the trial of the assassination of Mr. Fualdès: written by herself and addressed to Madame Enjalran, her mother / [ed . by Henri de Latouche] , Paris, Chez Pillet, 1818, available at Gallica
- Peter Shankland, Murder with a double tongue: the enigma of Clarissa Manson, London, Kimber, 1978. ISBN 978-0-7183-0026-5.
- Armand Praviel, The murder of Monsieur Fualdès, London, Glasgow W. Collins Sons, 1923.
