= Deruelle =

Deruelle is a surname. Notable people with the surname include:

- Dayna Deruelle (born 1982), Canadian curler
- Dimitri Deruelle (born 1971), French yacht racer
- Jean Deruelle (1915–2001), French essayist
- Nathalie Deruelle (born 1952), French physicist

== See also ==
- Druelle
