= Honoré de Bonald =

Honoré Marie Joseph Léon Guillaume de Bonald
- Born: 13 August 1894; Valady, Aveyron, France
- Died: 7 December 1977 (aged 83); Montpellier, France
- Military career
- Allegiance: France
- Branch: Cavalry, then flying service
- Rank: Lieutenant
- Unit: Escadrille 69
- Awards: Legion d'Honneur; Croix de Guerre; Italian Silver Medal of Military Valor

Lieutenant Honoré Marie Joseph Léon Guillaume de Bonald, Vicomte de La Rode (13 August 1894 – 7 December 1977) was a French World War I flying ace credited with five aerial victories.

== Biography ==
De Bonald was born in 1894 in Valady, France, into an aristocratic family. He was the son of Joseph Marie Jacques Ambroise de Bonald, 4th Baron de Bonald and 8th Viscount de la Rode, and Marie-Philippe Germaine de Carayon Talpayrac. He had two sisters. He volunteered for four years in the French military on 23 October 1913. After being promoted to Maréchal des logis in the Hussars, he was sent to pilot's training on 16 September 1915. On 30 December 1915, he received his Military Pilot's Brevet. After advanced training, he was posted to Escadrille 69 on 6 April 1916. On 14 June, he was wounded seriously enough to be medically evacuated. When he had recovered, Escadrille 69 had been shifted to the Italian Front; he followed them there.

By war's end, he had been commissioned as lieutenant. He had shot down five enemy airplanes between 1 November 1916 and June 1917. He had also earned the honor of becoming a Chevalier in the Legion d'honneur. He also held the Croix de Guerre and the Italian Medal of Military Valor.

He was married to Henriette de Lastic-Vigouroux.

== Honors and awards citations ==
Chevalier de la Légion d'Honneur

"Pilot of Escadrille N69; energetic and brave officer. Very seriously wounded in the cavalry, when his wounds healed he requested to serve in aviation. Since he arrived at his Escadrille he has shown himself to be a first class pursuit pilot. Has completed numerous hours of flight and has had many combats. He downed his fourth enemy plane on 3 June 1917. Already twice cited in orders."

Chevalier de la Légion d'Honneur citation, 15 June 1917.
