= Druelle =

Commune in Aveyron, France

- Part of Druelle Balsac
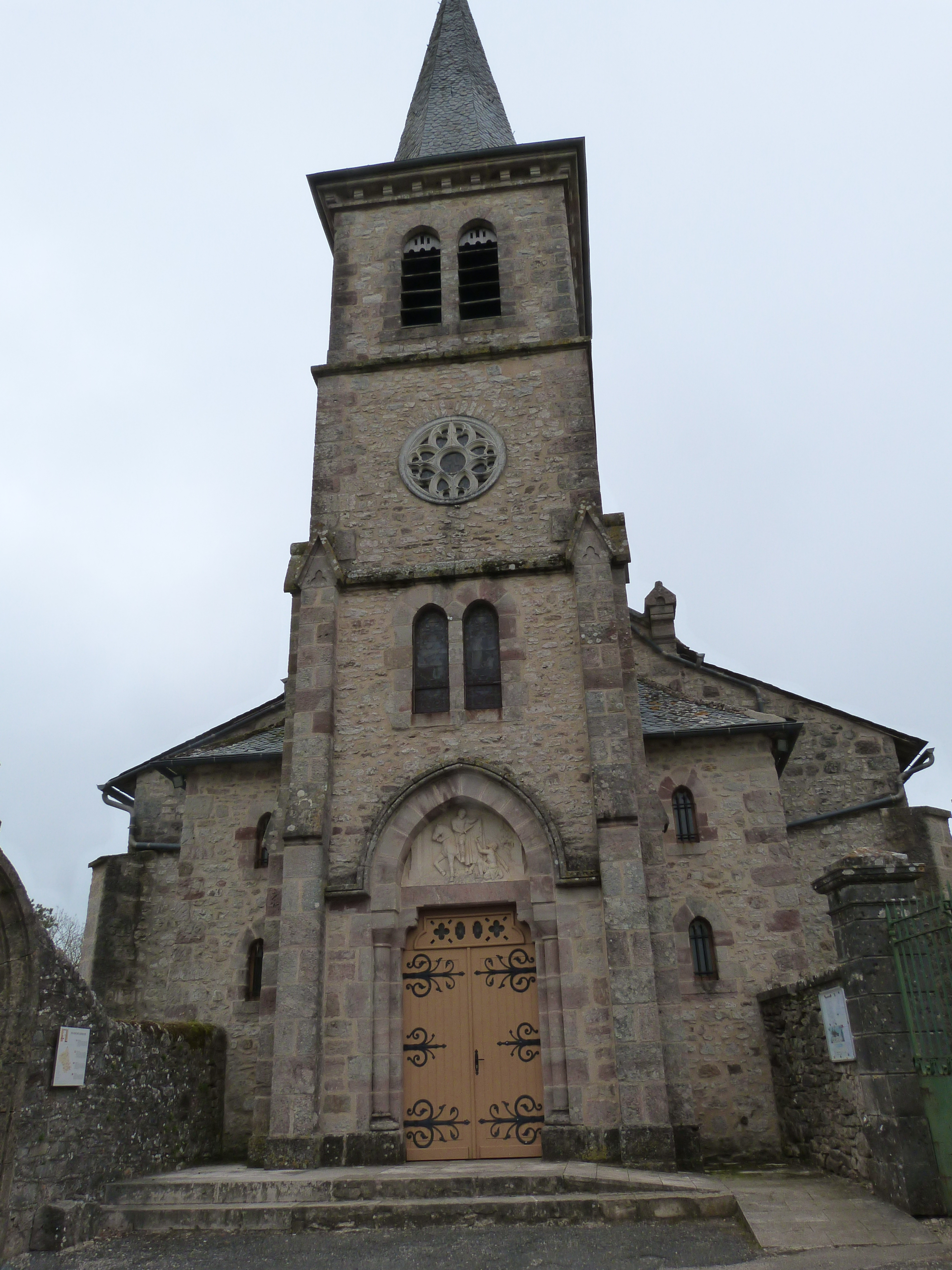
- The church of Saint-Martin of Limouze, in Druelle
- Location of Druelle
- Location within France Location within Occitanie
- Coordinates: 44°20′43″N 2°29′38″E
- Country: France
- Region: Occitania
- Department: Aveyron
- Arrondissement: Rodez
- Canton: Vallon
- Commune: Druelle Balsac
- Area^{1}: 35.68 km^{2} (13.78 sq mi)
- Elevation: 500 m (1,600 ft)
- Highest elevation: 666 m (2,185 ft)
- Lowest elevation: 392 m (1,286 ft)
- Population (2017): 2,512
  - Density: 70.40/km^{2} (182.3/sq mi)
- Time zone: UTC+01:00 (CET)
  - Summer (DST): UTC+02:00 (CEST)
- Postal code: 12510
- ^{1} French Land Register data, which excludes lakes, ponds, glaciers > 1 km^{2} (0.386 sq mi or 247 acres) and river estuaries.

Druelle (French pronunciation: [dʁyɛl]; Languedocien: Druèla) is a former commune in the Aveyron department in southern France. On 1 January 2017, it was merged into the new commune Druelle Balsac.

== Population ==
Historical population
Year	Pop.	±% p.a.
1954	988	—
1962	784	−2.85%
1968	905	+2.42%
1975	958	+0.82%
1982	1,221	+3.53%
1990	1,420	+1.91%
1999	1,685	+1.92%
2017	2,512	+2.24%
Source: EHESS and INSEE

== See also ==
- Communes of the Aveyron department
