= Jean Verdier =

French Cardinal

His Eminence Jean Verdier P.S.S.
- Cardinal, Archbishop of Paris
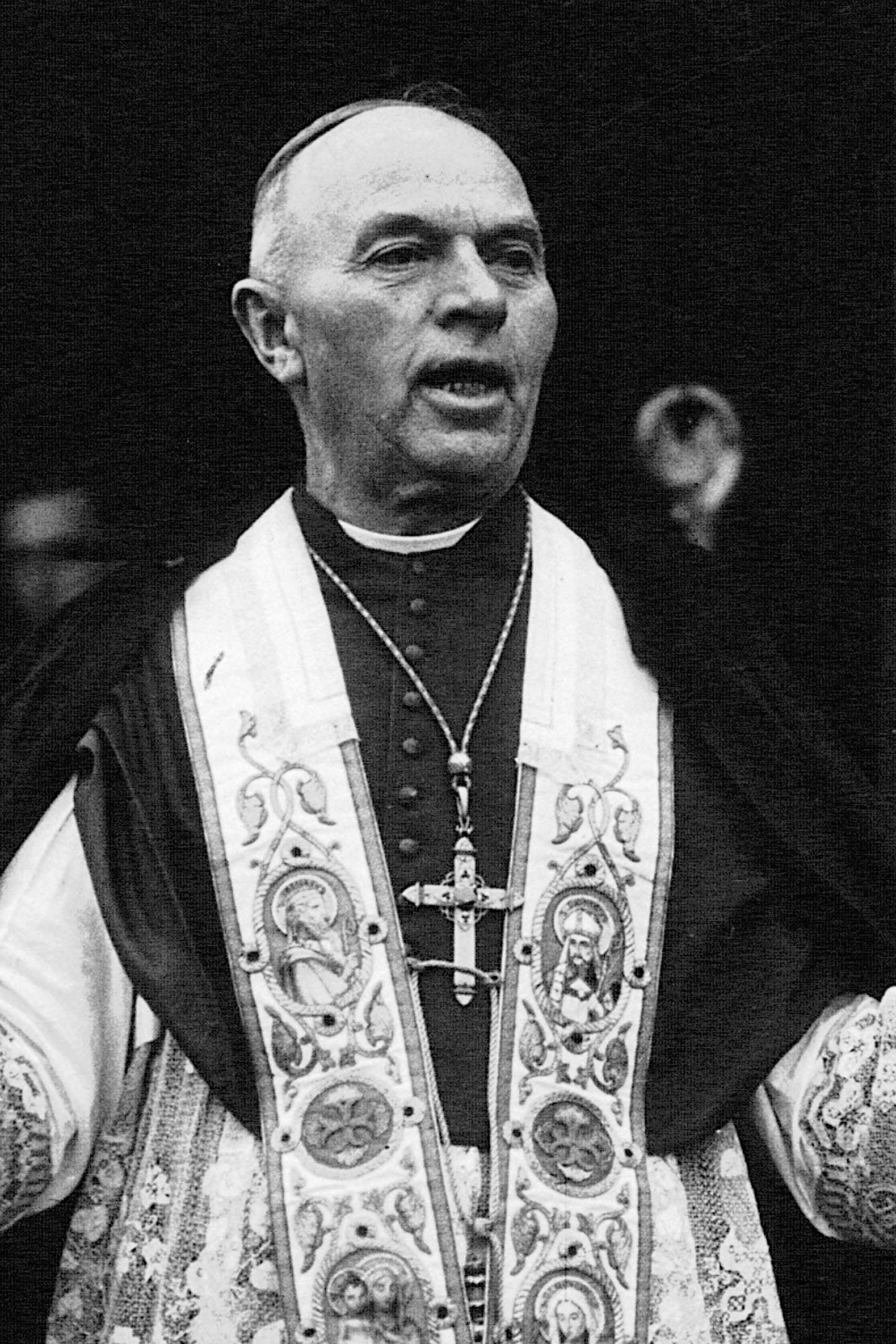
- Church: Roman Catholic
- Archdiocese: Paris
- Installed: 1929
- Term ended: 9 April 1940
- Predecessor: Louis-Ernest Dubois
- Successor: Emmanuel Célestin Suhard
- Other post: Cardinal-Priest of Santa Balbina

Orders
- Ordination: 9 April 1887
- Consecration: 29 December 1929 by Pius XI
- Created cardinal: 16 December 1929 by Pius XI
- Rank: Cardinal-Priest

Personal details
- Born: 19 February 1864 Lacroix-Barrez, France
- Died: 9 April 1940 (aged 76) Paris, France
- Buried: Notre Dame de Paris
- Coat of arms

Styles of Jean Verdier
- Reference style: His Eminence
- Spoken style: Your Eminence
- Informal style: Cardinal
- See: Paris

Jean Verdier, PSS (French: [ʒɑ̃ vɛʁdje]; 19 February 1864 – 9 April 1940) was a French Cardinal of the Roman Catholic Church. He served as Archbishop of Paris from 1929 until his death, and was elevated to the cardinalate in 1929.

== Biography ==
Jean Verdier was born to a modest family in Lacroix-Barrez, Aveyron, and studied at the seminary in Rodez before entering the Society of Saint-Sulpice in 1886. He was ordained to the priesthood on 9 April 1887 and then taught at the seminary of Périgueux until 1898, serving as its rector from 1898 to 1912. From 1912 to 1920, Verdier served as a professor and the superior of the Seminary "Des Carmes" in Paris. He became an honorary canon of the metropolitan cathedral of Paris in 1923, and served as Vice-Superior General (1926–1929) before being elected Superior General of his society on 16 July 1929. During that same year, he was made vicar general of Paris and a protonotary apostolic.

On 18 November 1929, Verdier was appointed Archbishop of Paris by Pope Pius XI. He received his episcopal consecration on the following 29 December from Pope Pius himself, with Archbishop Alfred-Henri-Marie Baudrillart, Orat, and Bishop Emmanuel-Anatole Chaptal serving as co-consecrators, in the Sistine Chapel. Early in his tenure as Archbishop, he ordered all French priests to conduct an "extensive survey" into any alcoholism existing in their parishes.

Pius XI created him Cardinal-Priest of Santa Balbina in the consistory of 16 December 1929; Verdier was the first Sulpician to be elevated to the College of Cardinals. He served as Special Legate to several events between 1930 and 1939, and was one of the cardinals who participated in the 1939 papal conclave that elected Pope Pius XII.

An opponent of Fascism, Verdier described World War II as "a crusade...We are struggling to preserve the freedom of people throughout the world, whether they be great or small peoples, and to preserve their possessions and their very lives. No other war has had aims that are more spiritual, moral, and, in sum, more Christian". Besides his native French, he was fluent in German and Italian, but spoke little English, for which he required an interpreter on international visits.

The Cardinal died in Paris, at the age of 76. He is buried in Notre-Dame Cathedral.

Catholic Church titles
Preceded by Louis-Ernest Dubois	Archbishop of Paris; 18 November 1929 – 9 April 1940	Succeeded by Emmanuel Célestin Suhard
