= Curières =

Commune in Occitanie, France

- Commune
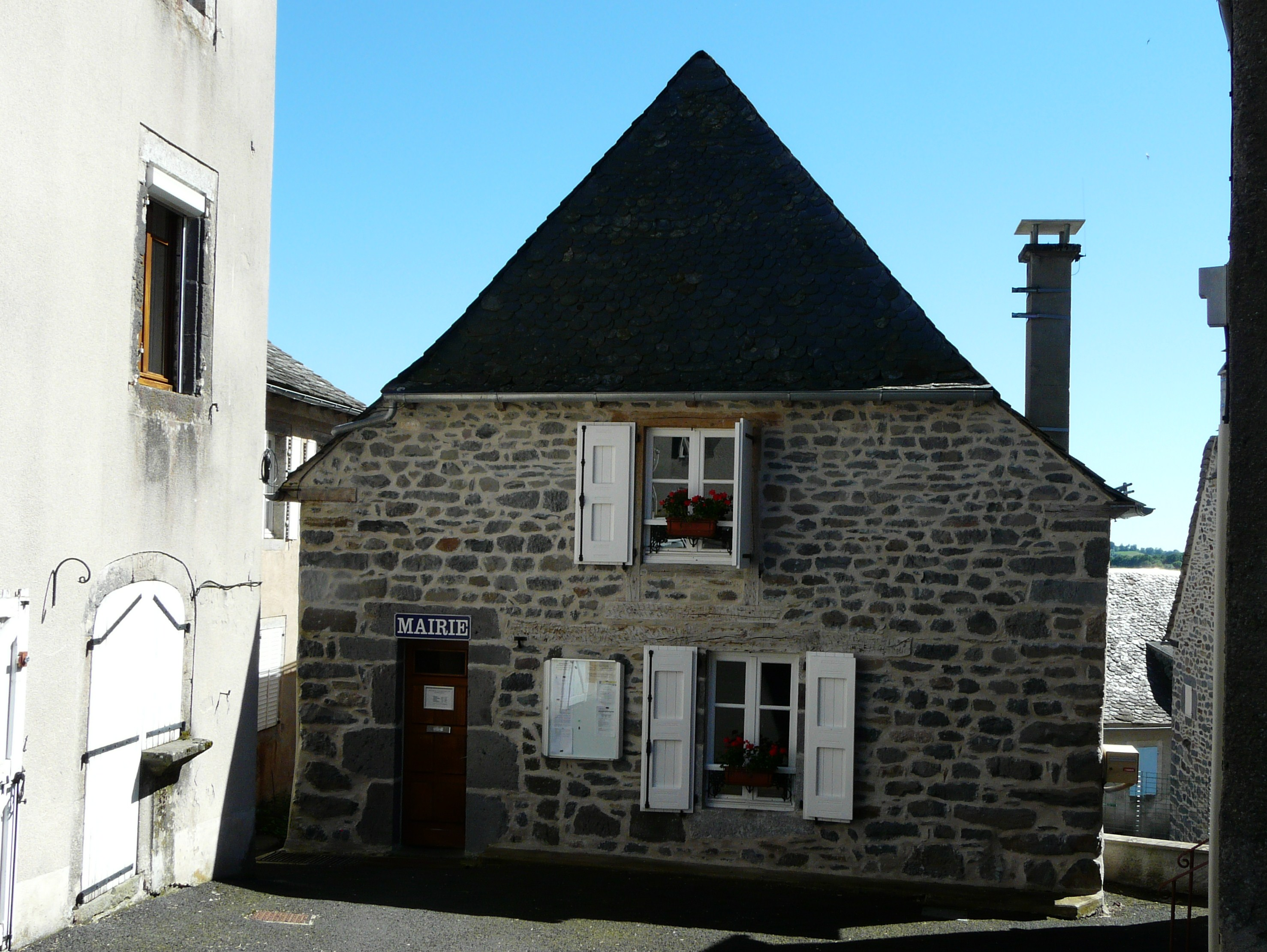
- Town hall

- Coat of arms
- Location of Curières
- Location within France Location within Occitanie
- Coordinates: 44°39′14″N 2°52′00″E
- Country: France
- Region: Occitania
- Department: Aveyron
- Arrondissement: Rodez
- Canton: Aubrac et Carladez

Government
  - Mayor (2020–2026): Martine Bessiere
- Area^{1}: 36.06 km^{2} (13.92 sq mi)
- Elevation: 943 m (3,094 ft)
- Highest elevation: 1,404 m (4,606 ft)
- Lowest elevation: 635 m (2,083 ft)
- Population (2023): 215
  - Density: 5.96/km^{2} (15.4/sq mi)
- Time zone: UTC+01:00 (CET)
  - Summer (DST): UTC+02:00 (CEST)
- INSEE/Postal code: 12088 /12210
- ^{1} French Land Register data, which excludes lakes, ponds, glaciers > 1 km^{2} (0.386 sq mi or 247 acres) and river estuaries.

Curières (French pronunciation: [kyʁjɛʁ]; Occitan: Curièiras) is a commune in the Aveyron department in southern France.

== Population ==
Historical population
Year	Pop.	±% p.a.
1968	371	—
1975	323	−1.96%
1982	277	−2.17%
1990	285	+0.36%
1999	264	−0.85%
2007	256	−0.38%
2012	224	−2.64%
2017	226	+0.18%
2023	215	−0.83%
Source: INSEE

== See also ==
- Communes of the Aveyron department
