= Murols =

Commune in Occitanie, France

- Commune
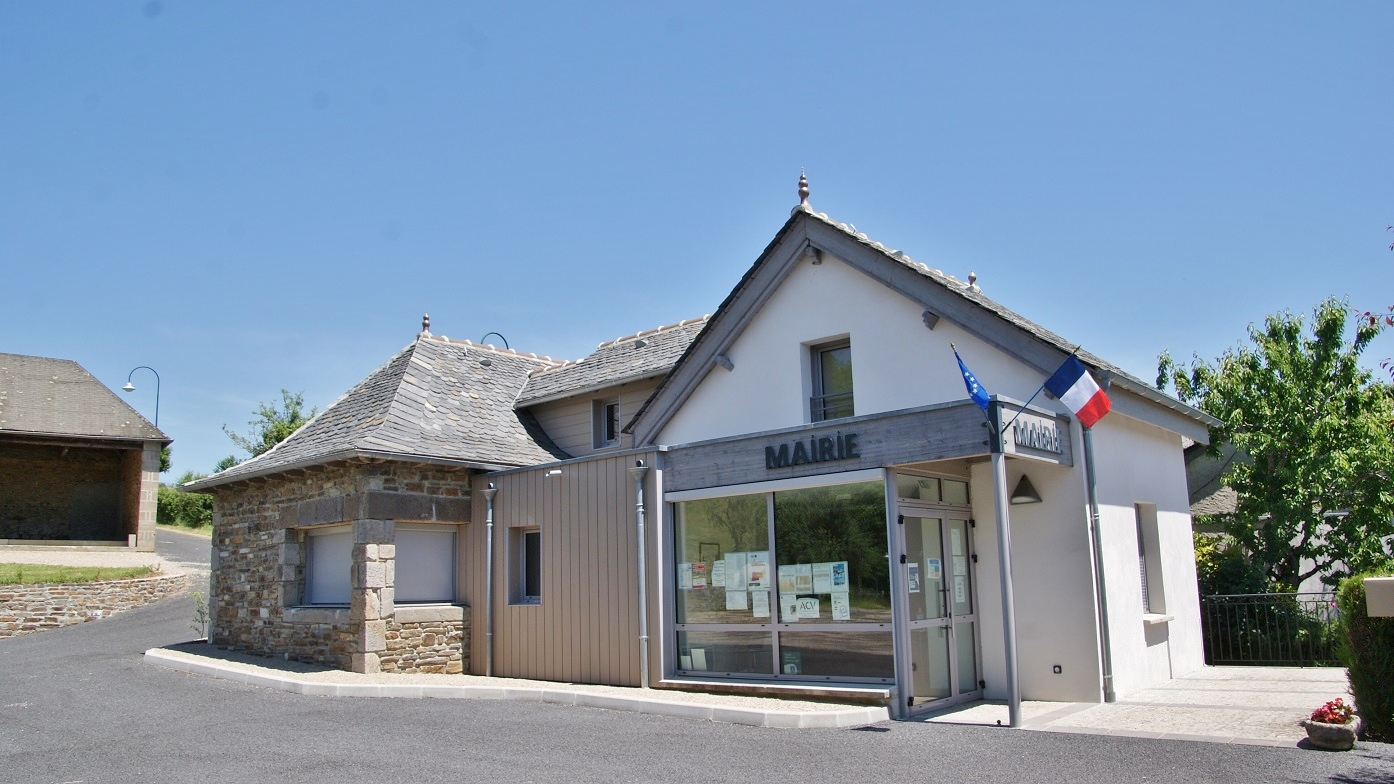
- Town hall
- Location of Murols
- Location within France Location within Occitanie
- Coordinates: 44°45′20″N 2°34′38″E
- Country: France
- Region: Occitania
- Department: Aveyron
- Arrondissement: Rodez
- Canton: Aubrac et Carladez

Government
  - Mayor (2020–2026): Roland Cazard
- Area^{1}: 13.9 km^{2} (5.4 sq mi)
- Elevation: 637 m (2,090 ft)
- Highest elevation: 725 m (2,379 ft)
- Lowest elevation: 308 m (1,010 ft)
- Population (2023): 97
  - Density: 7.0/km^{2} (18/sq mi)
- Time zone: UTC+01:00 (CET)
  - Summer (DST): UTC+02:00 (CEST)
- INSEE/Postal code: 12166 /12600
- ^{1} French Land Register data, which excludes lakes, ponds, glaciers > 1 km^{2} (0.386 sq mi or 247 acres) and river estuaries.

Murols is a commune in the Aveyron department in southern France.

== Population ==
Historical population
Year	Pop.	±% p.a.
1968	240	—
1975	240	+0.00%
1982	193	−3.07%
1990	175	−1.22%
1999	130	−3.25%
2007	106	−2.52%
2012	109	+0.56%
2017	113	+0.72%
2023	97	−2.51%
Source: INSEE

== See also ==
- Communes of the Aveyron department
