= Cantoin =

Commune in Occitanie, France

- Commune
- Coat of arms
- Location of Cantoin
- Location within France Location within Occitanie
- Coordinates: 44°50′12″N 2°48′48″E
- Country: France
- Region: Occitania
- Department: Aveyron
- Arrondissement: Rodez
- Canton: Aubrac et Carladez

Government
  - Mayor (2020–2026): Simon Cros
- Area^{1}: 42.37 km^{2} (16.36 sq mi)
- Elevation: 950 m (3,120 ft)
- Highest elevation: 1,024 m (3,360 ft)
- Lowest elevation: 647 m (2,123 ft)
- Population (2023): 312
  - Density: 7.36/km^{2} (19.1/sq mi)
- Time zone: UTC+01:00 (CET)
  - Summer (DST): UTC+02:00 (CEST)
- INSEE/Postal code: 12051 /12420
- ^{1} French Land Register data, which excludes lakes, ponds, glaciers > 1 km^{2} (0.386 sq mi or 247 acres) and river estuaries.

Cantoin (French pronunciation: [kɑ̃twɛ̃]; Occitan: Cantoenh) is a commune in the Aveyron department in southern France.

== Population ==
Historical population
Year	Pop.	±% p.a.
1968	490	—
1975	398	−2.93%
1982	402	+0.14%
1990	390	−0.38%
1999	312	−2.45%
2007	318	+0.24%
2012	322	+0.25%
2017	305	−1.08%
2023	312	+0.38%
Source: INSEE

== See also ==
- Communes of the Aveyron department
