= Saint-Symphorien-de-Thénières =

Commune in Occitanie, France

- Commune
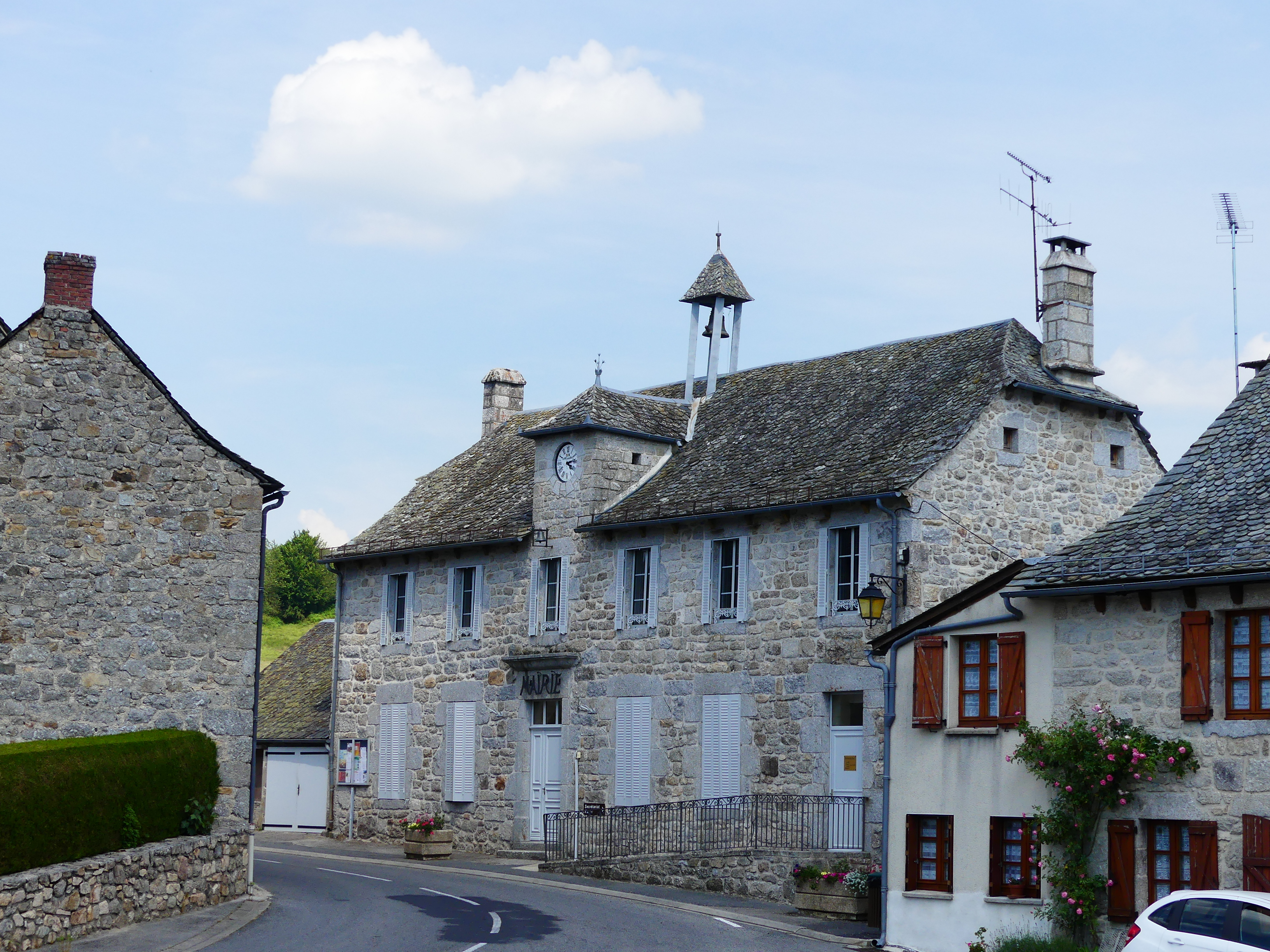
- Saint-Symphorien-de-Thénières Town hall
- Location of Saint-Symphorien-de-Thénières
- Location within France Location within Occitanie
- Coordinates: 44°44′17″N 2°43′47″E
- Country: France
- Region: Occitania
- Department: Aveyron
- Arrondissement: Rodez
- Canton: Aubrac et Carladez

Government
  - Mayor (2020–2026): Robert Rispal
- Area^{1}: 31.63 km^{2} (12.21 sq mi)
- Elevation: 724 m (2,375 ft)
- Highest elevation: 946 m (3,104 ft)
- Lowest elevation: 300 m (980 ft)
- Population (2023): 218
  - Density: 6.89/km^{2} (17.9/sq mi)
- Time zone: UTC+01:00 (CET)
  - Summer (DST): UTC+02:00 (CEST)
- INSEE/Postal code: 12250 /12460
- ^{1} French Land Register data, which excludes lakes, ponds, glaciers > 1 km^{2} (0.386 sq mi or 247 acres) and river estuaries.

Saint-Symphorien-de-Thénières (French pronunciation: [sɛ̃ sɛ̃fɔʁjɛ̃ də tenjɛʁ]; Occitan: Sant Aforian de Teièrs) is a commune in the Aveyron department in southern France.

== Population ==
Historical population
Year	Pop.	±% p.a.
1968	330	—
1975	294	−1.64%
1982	311	+0.81%
1990	251	−2.64%
1999	228	−1.06%
2007	235	+0.38%
2012	232	−0.26%
2017	211	−1.88%
2023	218	+0.55%
Source: INSEE

== See also ==
- Communes of the Aveyron department
