= Florentin-la-Capelle =

Commune in Occitanie, France

- Commune
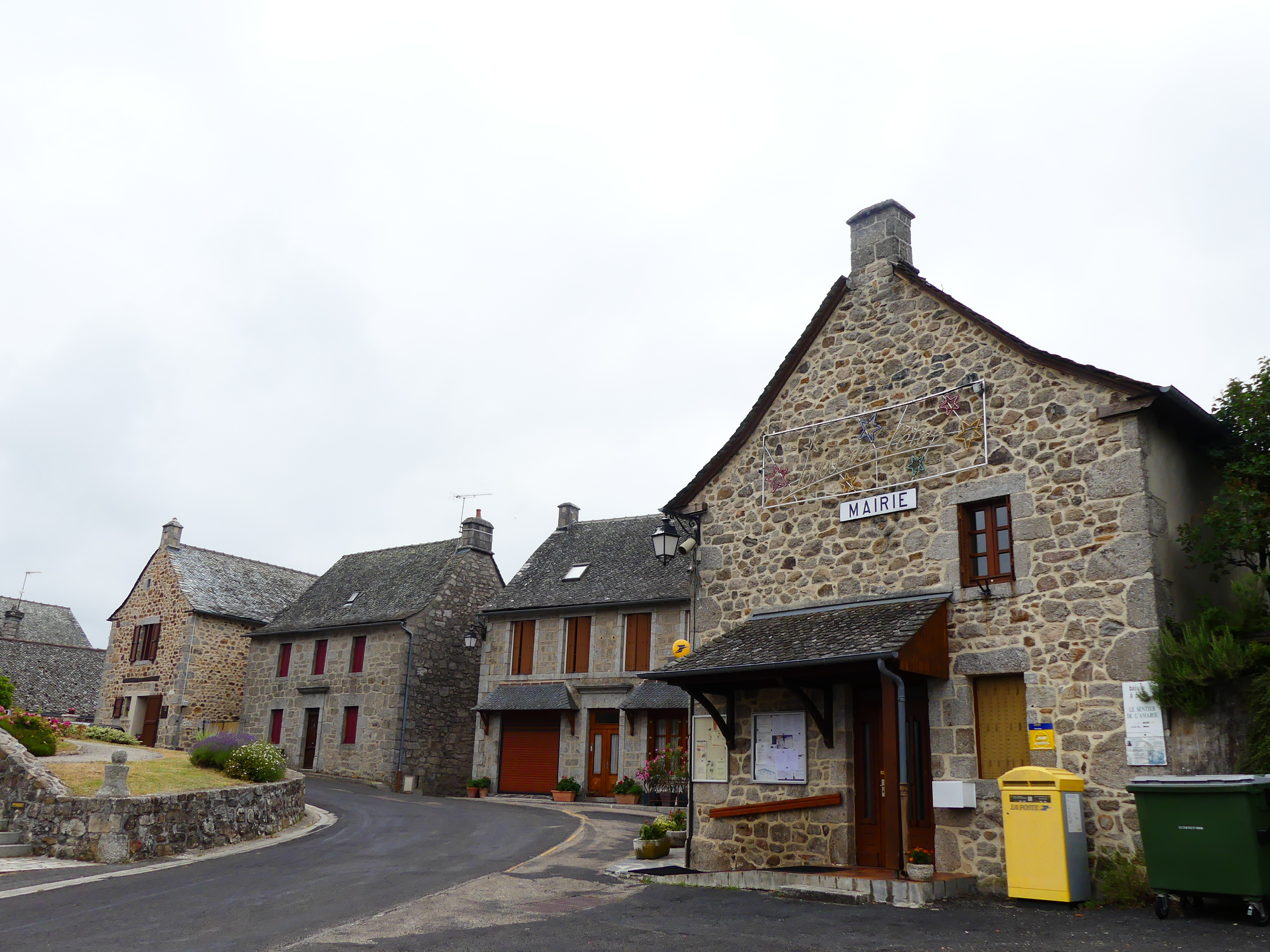
- Florentin-la-Capelle Town hall

- Coat of arms
- Location of Florentin-la-Capelle
- Location within France Location within Occitanie
- Coordinates: 44°37′53″N 2°37′58″E
- Country: France
- Region: Occitania
- Department: Aveyron
- Arrondissement: Rodez
- Canton: Aubrac et Carladez

Government
  - Mayor (2020–2026): Lucien Veyre
- Area^{1}: 36.8 km^{2} (14.2 sq mi)
- Elevation: 700 m (2,300 ft)
- Highest elevation: 803 m (2,635 ft)
- Lowest elevation: 230 m (750 ft)
- Population (2023): 286
  - Density: 7.77/km^{2} (20.1/sq mi)
- Time zone: UTC+01:00 (CET)
  - Summer (DST): UTC+02:00 (CEST)
- INSEE/Postal code: 12103 /12140
- ^{1} French Land Register data, which excludes lakes, ponds, glaciers > 1 km^{2} (0.386 sq mi or 247 acres) and river estuaries.

Florentin-la-Capelle (French pronunciation: [flɔʁɑ̃tɛ̃ la kapɛl]; Occitan: Florentinh la Capèla) is a commune in the Aveyron department in southern France.

== Population ==
Historical population
Year	Pop.	±% p.a.
1968	532	—
1975	468	−1.81%
1982	434	−1.07%
1990	401	−0.98%
1999	373	−0.80%
2007	330	−1.52%
2012	313	−1.05%
2017	279	−2.27%
2023	286	+0.41%
Source: INSEE

== See also ==
- Communes of the Aveyron department
