= Saint-Amans-des-Cots =

Commune in Occitanie, France

Saint-Amans-des-Côts
- Commune
- Coat of arms
- Location of Saint-Amans-des-Côts
- Location within France Location within Occitanie
- Coordinates: 44°41′N 2°40′E
- Country: France
- Region: Occitania
- Department: Aveyron
- Arrondissement: Rodez
- Canton: Aubrac et Carladez

Government
  - Mayor (2020–2026): Christian Cagnac
- Area^{1}: 41.51 km^{2} (16.03 sq mi)
- Elevation: 748 m (2,454 ft)
- Highest elevation: 882 m (2,894 ft)
- Lowest elevation: 355 m (1,165 ft)
- Population (2023): 709
  - Density: 17.1/km^{2} (44.2/sq mi)
- Time zone: UTC+01:00 (CET)
  - Summer (DST): UTC+02:00 (CEST)
- INSEE/Postal code: 12209 /12460
- ^{1} French Land Register data, which excludes lakes, ponds, glaciers > 1 km^{2} (0.386 sq mi or 247 acres) and river estuaries.

Saint-Amans-des-Cots (French pronunciation: [sɛ̃.t‿amɑ̃ de ko]; Languedocien: Sant Amanç) is a commune in the Aveyron department in southern France.

== Population ==
Historical population
Year	Pop.	±% p.a.
1968	1,020	—
1975	931	−1.30%
1982	992	+0.91%
1990	859	−1.78%
1999	771	−1.19%
2007	773	+0.03%
2012	764	−0.23%
2017	754	−0.26%
2023	709	−1.02%
Source: INSEE

== See also ==
- Communes of the Aveyron department
