= Thérondels =

Commune in Occitanie, France

- Commune
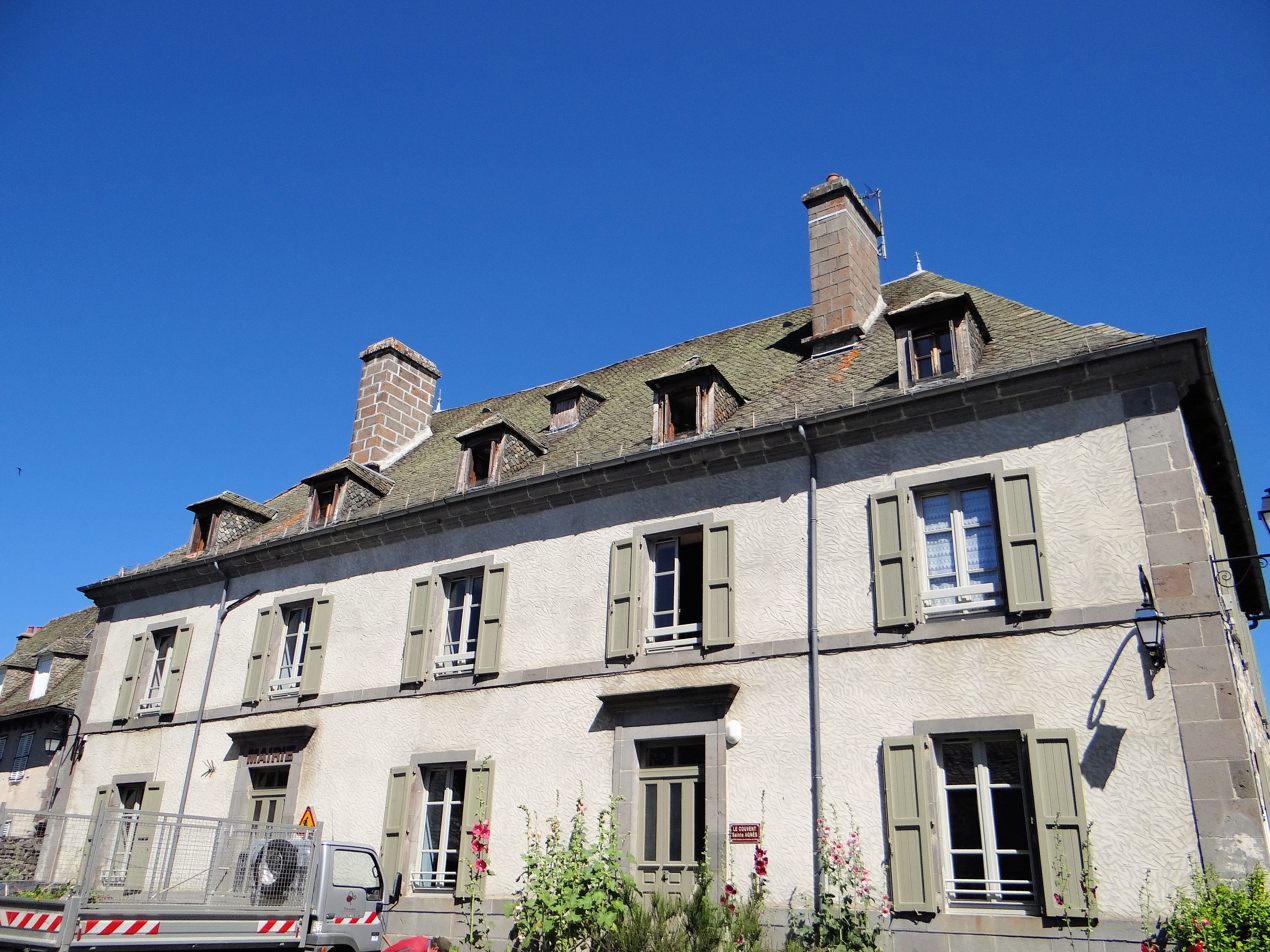
- The town hall in Thérondels
- Location of Thérondels
- Location within France Location within Occitanie
- Coordinates: 44°53′47″N 2°45′33″E
- Country: France
- Region: Occitania
- Department: Aveyron
- Arrondissement: Rodez
- Canton: Aubrac et Carladez

Government
  - Mayor (2022–2026): Jean-Michel Guimontheil
- Area^{1}: 38.47 km^{2} (14.85 sq mi)
- Elevation: 960 m (3,150 ft)
- Highest elevation: 1,023 m (3,356 ft)
- Lowest elevation: 646 m (2,119 ft)
- Population (2023): 357
  - Density: 9.28/km^{2} (24.0/sq mi)
- Time zone: UTC+01:00 (CET)
  - Summer (DST): UTC+02:00 (CEST)
- INSEE/Postal code: 12280 /12600
- ^{1} French Land Register data, which excludes lakes, ponds, glaciers > 1 km^{2} (0.386 sq mi or 247 acres) and river estuaries.

Thérondels is a commune in the Aveyron department in southern France.

== Villages ==
Apart from Thérondels itself, the commune includes several other villages and hamlets: Le Bousquet, Campheyt, Casternac, Douzalbats, Faliès, Fieux, Frons, Gorse, Jou, Ladignac, Laussac, Longvieux, Mandilhac, Le Meyniel, Nigresserre, and Pervilhergues. Laussac is situated on a peninsula in Lake Sarrans (a reservoir). South of Douzalbats there is an airstrip for ultralight aircraft.

== Population ==
Historical population
Year	Pop.	±% p.a.
1968	804	—
1975	683	−2.30%
1982	606	−1.69%
1990	505	−2.25%
1999	478	−0.61%
2007	481	+0.08%
2012	421	−2.63%
2017	406	−0.72%
2023	357	−2.12%
Source: INSEE

== See also ==
- Communes of the Aveyron department
