= Cassuéjouls =

Commune in Occitanie, France

- Commune
- Location of Cassuéjouls
- Location within France Location within Occitanie
- Coordinates: 44°43′38″N 2°49′06″E
- Country: France
- Region: Occitania
- Department: Aveyron
- Arrondissement: Rodez
- Canton: Aubrac et Carladez

Government
  - Mayor (2020–2026): Xavier Delouis
- Area^{1}: 10.35 km^{2} (4.00 sq mi)
- Elevation: 920 m (3,020 ft)
- Highest elevation: 1,129 m (3,704 ft)
- Lowest elevation: 824 m (2,703 ft)
- Population (2023): 107
  - Density: 10.3/km^{2} (26.8/sq mi)
- Time zone: UTC+01:00 (CET)
  - Summer (DST): UTC+02:00 (CEST)
- INSEE/Postal code: 12058 /12210
- ^{1} French Land Register data, which excludes lakes, ponds, glaciers > 1 km^{2} (0.386 sq mi or 247 acres) and river estuaries.

Cassuéjouls (French pronunciation: [kasɥeʒul]; Occitan: Cassuèjols) is a commune in the Aveyron department in southern France.

== Population ==
Historical population
| Year | Pop. | ±% p.a. |
|---|---|---|
| 1968 | 214 | — |
| 1975 | 186 | −1.98% |
| 1982 | 163 | −1.87% |
| 1990 | 152 | −0.87% |
| 1999 | 153 | +0.07% |
| 2007 | 139 | −1.19% |
| 2012 | 119 | −3.06% |
| 2017 | 108 | −1.92% |
| 2023 | 107 | −0.15% |
Source: INSEE

== See also ==
- Communes of the Aveyron department
