= Druelle Balsac =

Commune in Occitanie, France

- Commune
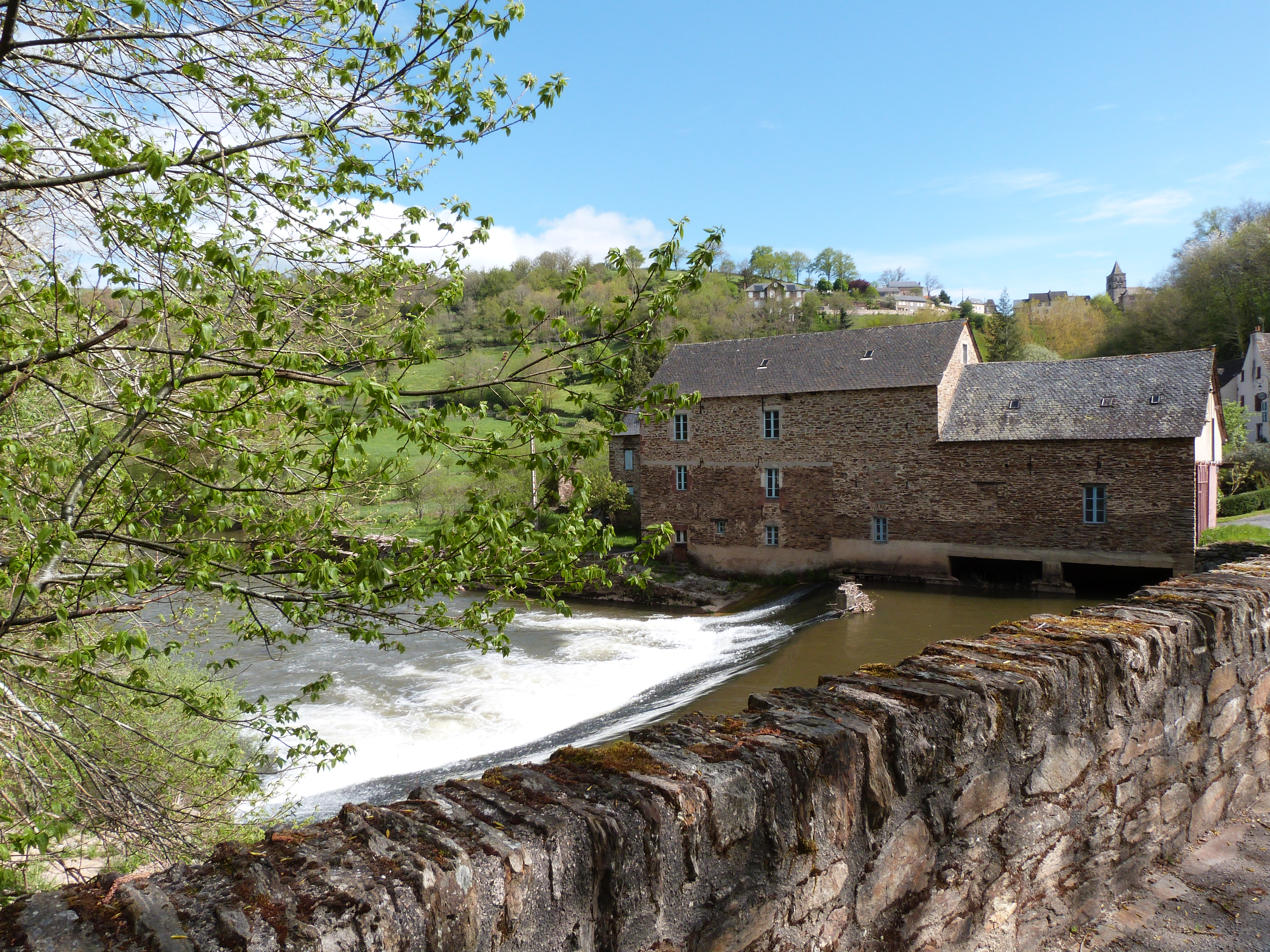
- The mill on the Aveyron river, in the hamlet of Les Planques
- Location of Druelle Balsac
- Location within France Location within Occitanie
- Coordinates: 44°20′42″N 2°29′35″E
- Country: France
- Region: Occitania
- Department: Aveyron
- Arrondissement: Rodez
- Canton: Vallon
- Intercommunality: Rodez Agglomération
- Area^{1}: 51.25 km^{2} (19.79 sq mi)
- Population (2023): 3,187
  - Density: 62.19/km^{2} (161.1/sq mi)
- Time zone: UTC+01:00 (CET)
  - Summer (DST): UTC+02:00 (CEST)
- INSEE/Postal code: 12090 /12000, 12510
- ^{1} French Land Register data, which excludes lakes, ponds, glaciers > 1 km^{2} (0.386 sq mi or 247 acres) and river estuaries.

Druelle Balsac (French pronunciation: [dʁyɛl balsak]; Occitan: Druèla e Balsac) is a commune in the department of Aveyron, southern France. The municipality was established on 1 January 2017 by merger of the former communes of Druelle (the seat) and Balsac.

== Population ==
Population data refer to the commune in its geography as of January 2025.

Historical population
Year	Pop.	±% p.a.
1968	1,233	—
1975	1,305	+0.81%
1982	1,628	+3.21%
1990	1,831	+1.48%
1999	2,186	+1.99%
2007	2,511	+1.75%
2012	2,634	+0.96%
2017	3,143	+3.60%
2023	3,187	+0.23%
Source: INSEE

== See also ==
- Communes of the Aveyron department
