= Taussac =

Commune in Occitanie, France

- Commune
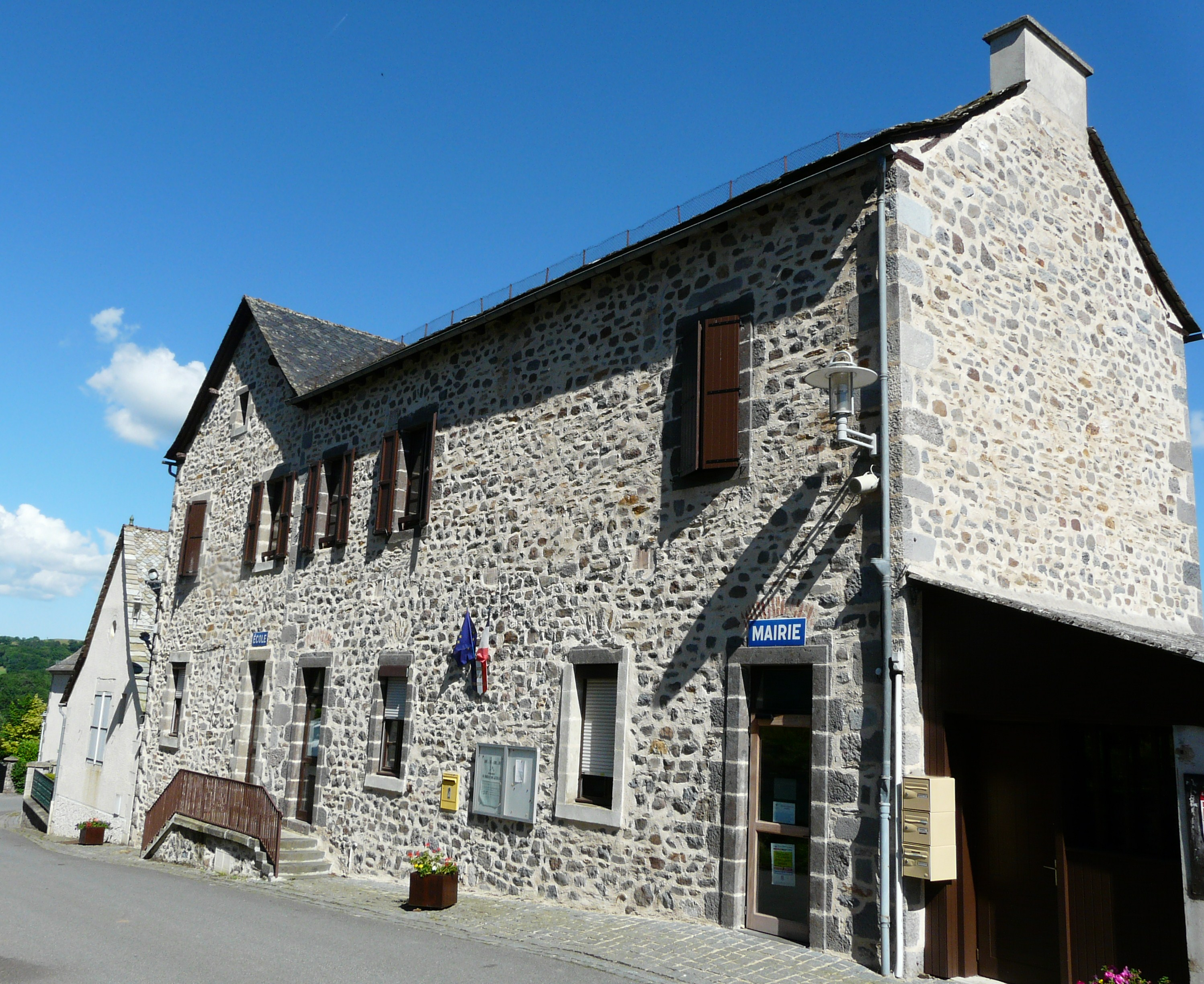
- Town hall
- Location of Taussac
- Location within France Location within Occitanie
- Coordinates: 44°49′47″N 2°38′33″E
- Country: France
- Region: Occitania
- Department: Aveyron
- Arrondissement: Rodez
- Canton: Aubrac et Carladez

Government
  - Mayor (2020–2026): Raymond Cayzac
- Area^{1}: 39.3 km^{2} (15.2 sq mi)
- Elevation: 735 m (2,411 ft)
- Highest elevation: 834 m (2,736 ft)
- Lowest elevation: 398 m (1,306 ft)
- Population (2023): 504
  - Density: 12.8/km^{2} (33.2/sq mi)
- Time zone: UTC+01:00 (CET)
  - Summer (DST): UTC+02:00 (CEST)
- INSEE/Postal code: 12277 /12600
- ^{1} French Land Register data, which excludes lakes, ponds, glaciers > 1 km^{2} (0.386 sq mi or 247 acres) and river estuaries.

Taussac (French pronunciation: [tosak]) is a commune in the Aveyron department in southern France.

== Population ==
Historical population
| Year | Pop. | ±% p.a. |
|---|---|---|
| 1968 | 551 | — |
| 1975 | 503 | −1.29% |
| 1982 | 552 | +1.34% |
| 1990 | 544 | −0.18% |
| 1999 | 526 | −0.37% |
| 2007 | 462 | −1.61% |
| 2012 | 449 | −0.57% |
| 2017 | 520 | +2.98% |
| 2023 | 504 | −0.52% |
Source: INSEE

== See also ==
- Communes of the Aveyron department
