= Canton of Aubrac et Carladez =

Coordinates: 44.68°N 2.85°E

- Canton
- Situation of the canton of Aubrac et Carladez in the department of Aveyron
- Country: France
- Region: Occitania
- Department: Aveyron
- No. of communes: {{{nbcomm}}}
- Population (2023): 9,856
- INSEE code: 1201

The canton of Aubrac et Carladez is an administrative division of the Aveyron department, southern France. It was created at the French canton reorganisation which came into effect in March 2015. Its seat is in Laguiole.

It consists of the following communes:

1. Argences-en-Aubrac
2. Brommat
3. Campouriez
4. Cantoin
5. Cassuéjouls
6. Condom-d'Aubrac
7. Curières
8. Florentin-la-Capelle
9. Huparlac
10. Lacroix-Barrez
11. Laguiole
12. Montézic
13. Montpeyroux
14. Mur-de-Barrez
15. Murols
16. Saint-Amans-des-Cots
17. Saint-Chély-d'Aubrac
18. Saint-Symphorien-de-Thénières
19. Soulages-Bonneval
20. Taussac
21. Thérondels
