= Huparlac =

Commune in Occitanie, France

- Commune
- Location of Huparlac
- Location within France Location within Occitanie
- Coordinates: 44°42′53″N 2°45′46″E
- Country: France
- Region: Occitania
- Department: Aveyron
- Arrondissement: Rodez
- Canton: Aubrac et Carladez

Government
  - Mayor (2020–2026): Christian Laborie
- Area^{1}: 24.7 km^{2} (9.5 sq mi)
- Elevation: 850 m (2,790 ft)
- Highest elevation: 952 m (3,123 ft)
- Lowest elevation: 659 m (2,162 ft)
- Population (2023): 250
  - Density: 10/km^{2} (26/sq mi)
- Time zone: UTC+01:00 (CET)
  - Summer (DST): UTC+02:00 (CEST)
- INSEE/Postal code: 12116 /12460
- ^{1} French Land Register data, which excludes lakes, ponds, glaciers > 1 km^{2} (0.386 sq mi or 247 acres) and river estuaries.

Huparlac (French pronunciation: [ypaʁlak]; Occitan: Uparlac) is a commune in the Aveyron department in southern France.

== Population ==
Historical population
Year	Pop.	±% p.a.
1968	389	—
1975	350	−1.50%
1982	324	−1.10%
1990	277	−1.94%
1999	237	−1.72%
2007	244	+0.36%
2012	241	−0.25%
2017	257	+1.29%
2023	250	−0.46%
Source: INSEE

== See also ==
- Communes of the Aveyron department
