= Condom-d'Aubrac =

Commune in Occitanie, France

- Commune
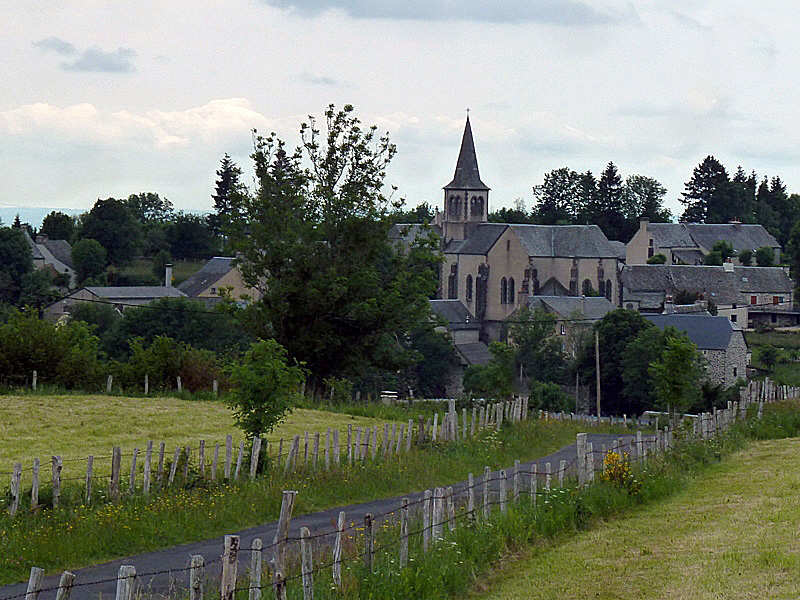
- The church and surrounding buildings in Condom-d'Aubrac

- Coat of arms
- Location of Condom-d'Aubrac
- Location within France Location within Occitanie
- Coordinates: 44°36′16″N 2°51′58″E
- Country: France
- Region: Occitania
- Department: Aveyron
- Arrondissement: Rodez
- Canton: Aubrac et Carladez

Government
  - Mayor (2020–2026): Geneviève Gasq-Barès
- Area^{1}: 46.08 km^{2} (17.79 sq mi)
- Elevation: 950 m (3,120 ft)
- Highest elevation: 1,440 m (4,720 ft)
- Lowest elevation: 465 m (1,526 ft)
- Population (2023): 285
  - Density: 6.18/km^{2} (16.0/sq mi)
- Time zone: UTC+01:00 (CET)
  - Summer (DST): UTC+02:00 (CEST)
- INSEE/Postal code: 12074 /12470
- ^{1} French Land Register data, which excludes lakes, ponds, glaciers > 1 km^{2} (0.386 sq mi or 247 acres) and river estuaries.

Condom-d'Aubrac (French pronunciation: [kɔ̃dɔ̃ dobʁak]; Occitan: Condom d'Aubrac) is a commune in the Aveyron department in southern France.

== Population ==
Historical population
Year	Pop.	±% p.a.
1968	471	—
1975	382	−2.95%
1982	336	−1.82%
1990	349	+0.48%
1999	349	+0.00%
2007	321	−1.04%
2012	310	−0.69%
2017	301	−0.59%
2023	285	−0.91%
Source: INSEE

== See also ==
- Communes of the Aveyron department
