= Brommat =

Commune in Occitanie, France

- Commune
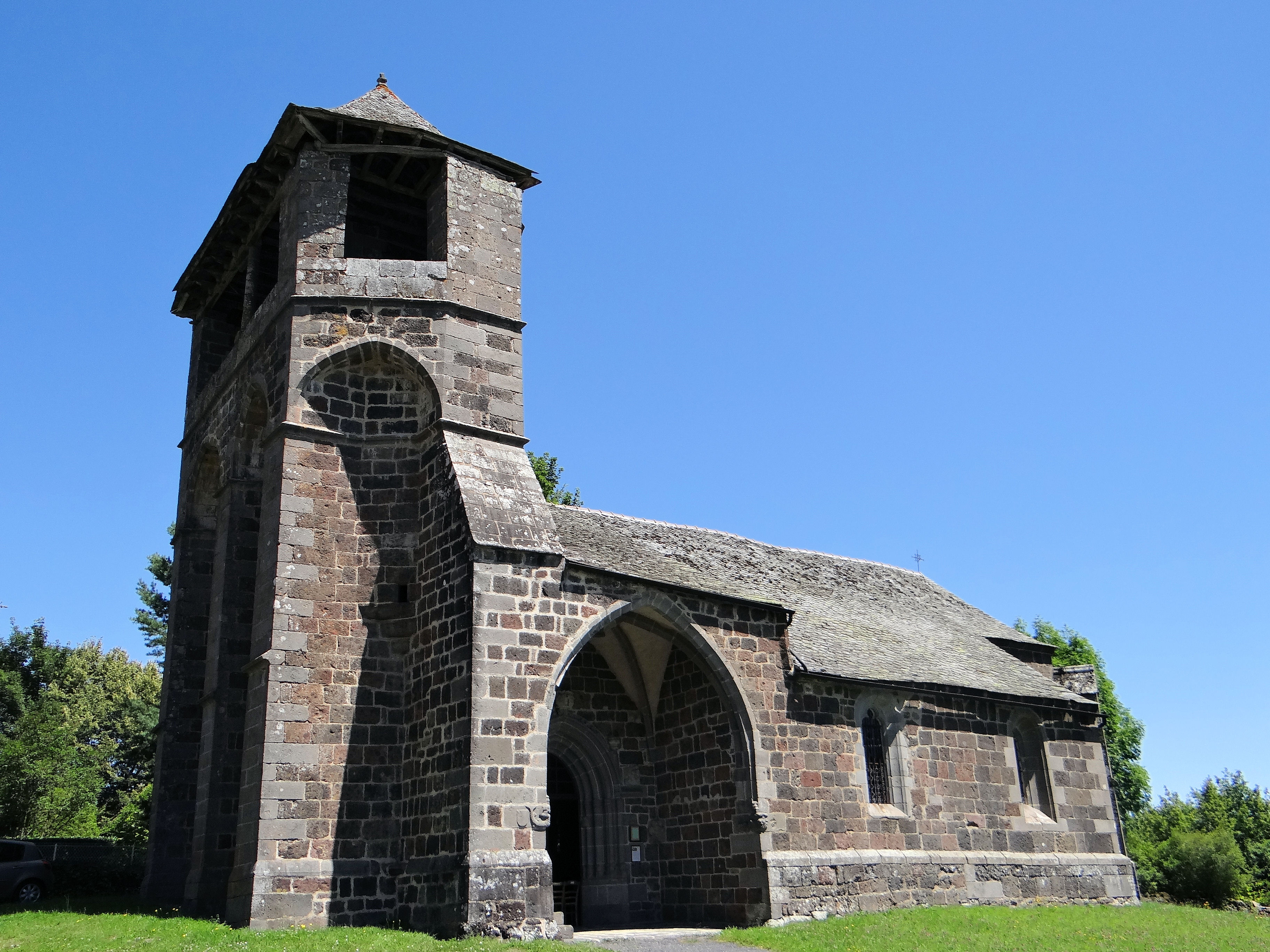
- The church of Saint-Roch d'Albinhac, in Brommat
- Location of Brommat
- Location within France Location within Occitanie
- Coordinates: 44°49′51″N 2°41′08″E
- Country: France
- Region: Occitania
- Department: Aveyron
- Arrondissement: Rodez
- Canton: Aubrac et Carladez

Government
  - Mayor (2020–2026): Didier Cayla
- Area^{1}: 43.28 km^{2} (16.71 sq mi)
- Elevation: 648 m (2,126 ft)
- Highest elevation: 933 m (3,061 ft)
- Lowest elevation: 312 m (1,024 ft)
- Population (2023): 628
  - Density: 14.5/km^{2} (37.6/sq mi)
- Time zone: UTC+01:00 (CET)
  - Summer (DST): UTC+02:00 (CEST)
- INSEE/Postal code: 12036 /12600
- ^{1} French Land Register data, which excludes lakes, ponds, glaciers > 1 km^{2} (0.386 sq mi or 247 acres) and river estuaries.

Brommat (French pronunciation: [bʁɔma]; Occitan: Brocmat) is a commune in the Aveyron department in southern France.

== Population ==
Historical population
Year	Pop.	±% p.a.
1968	971	—
1975	908	−0.95%
1982	932	+0.37%
1990	861	−0.99%
1999	781	−1.08%
2007	718	−1.05%
2012	662	−1.61%
2017	638	−0.74%
2023	628	−0.26%
Source: INSEE

== See also ==
- Communes of the Aveyron department
