= Soulages-Bonneval =

Commune in Occitanie, France

- Commune
- Location of Soulages-Bonneval
- Location within France Location within Occitanie
- Coordinates: 44°40′37″N 2°47′24″E
- Country: France
- Region: Occitania
- Department: Aveyron
- Arrondissement: Rodez
- Canton: Aubrac et Carladez

Government
  - Mayor (2020–2026): Lionel Pigot
- Area^{1}: 15.16 km^{2} (5.85 sq mi)
- Elevation: 900 m (3,000 ft)
- Highest elevation: 978 m (3,209 ft)
- Lowest elevation: 760 m (2,490 ft)
- Population (2023): 293
  - Density: 19.3/km^{2} (50.1/sq mi)
- Time zone: UTC+01:00 (CET)
  - Summer (DST): UTC+02:00 (CEST)
- INSEE/Postal code: 12273 /12210
- ^{1} French Land Register data, which excludes lakes, ponds, glaciers > 1 km^{2} (0.386 sq mi or 247 acres) and river estuaries.

Soulages-Bonneval (French pronunciation: [sulaʒ bɔnval]; Occitan: Solatges) is a commune in the Aveyron department in southern France.

== Population ==
Historical population
Year	Pop.	±% p.a.
1968	230	—
1975	260	+1.77%
1982	255	−0.28%
1990	259	+0.19%
1999	235	−1.07%
2007	275	+1.98%
2012	283	+0.58%
2017	293	+0.70%
2023	293	+0.00%
Source: INSEE

== See also ==
- Communes of the Aveyron department
