= Muret-le-Château =

Commune in Occitanie, France

Muret-le-Château Muret (Occitan)
- Commune
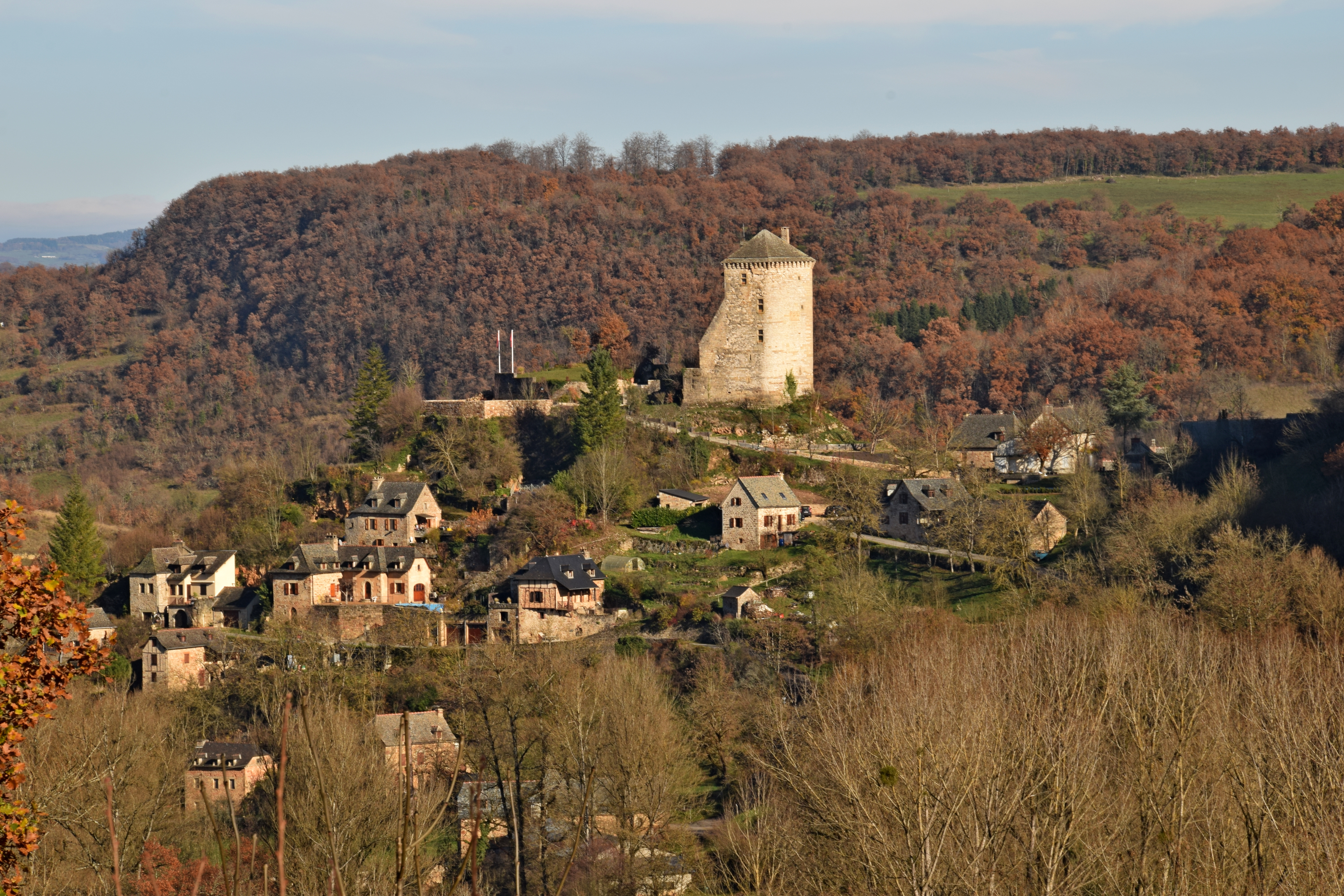
- A general view of Muret-le-Château

- Coat of arms
- Location of Muret-le-Château
- Location within France Location within Occitanie
- Coordinates: 44°29′40″N 2°34′25″E
- Country: France
- Region: Occitania
- Department: Aveyron
- Arrondissement: Rodez
- Canton: Vallon

Government
  - Mayor (2020–2026): Roland Aygalenq
- Area^{1}: 14.98 km^{2} (5.78 sq mi)
- Highest elevation: 604 m (1,982 ft)
- Lowest elevation: 327 m (1,073 ft)
- Population (2023): 350
  - Density: 23/km^{2} (61/sq mi)
- Time zone: UTC+01:00 (CET)
  - Summer (DST): UTC+02:00 (CEST)
- INSEE/Postal code: 12165 /12330
- ^{1} French Land Register data, which excludes lakes, ponds, glaciers > 1 km^{2} (0.386 sq mi or 247 acres) and river estuaries.

Muret-le-Château (French: [myʁɛ l(ə) ʃɑto]; Occitan: Muret) is a commune in the Aveyron department in southern France.

== Population ==
Historical population
| Year | Pop. | ±% p.a. |
|---|---|---|
| 1968 | 260 | — |
| 1975 | 207 | −3.20% |
| 1982 | 208 | +0.07% |
| 1990 | 263 | +2.98% |
| 1999 | 272 | +0.37% |
| 2007 | 298 | +1.15% |
| 2012 | 338 | +2.55% |
| 2017 | 352 | +0.82% |
| 2023 | 350 | −0.09% |
Source: INSEE

== See also ==
- Communes of the Aveyron department
