= Campouriez =

Commune in Occitanie, France

- Commune
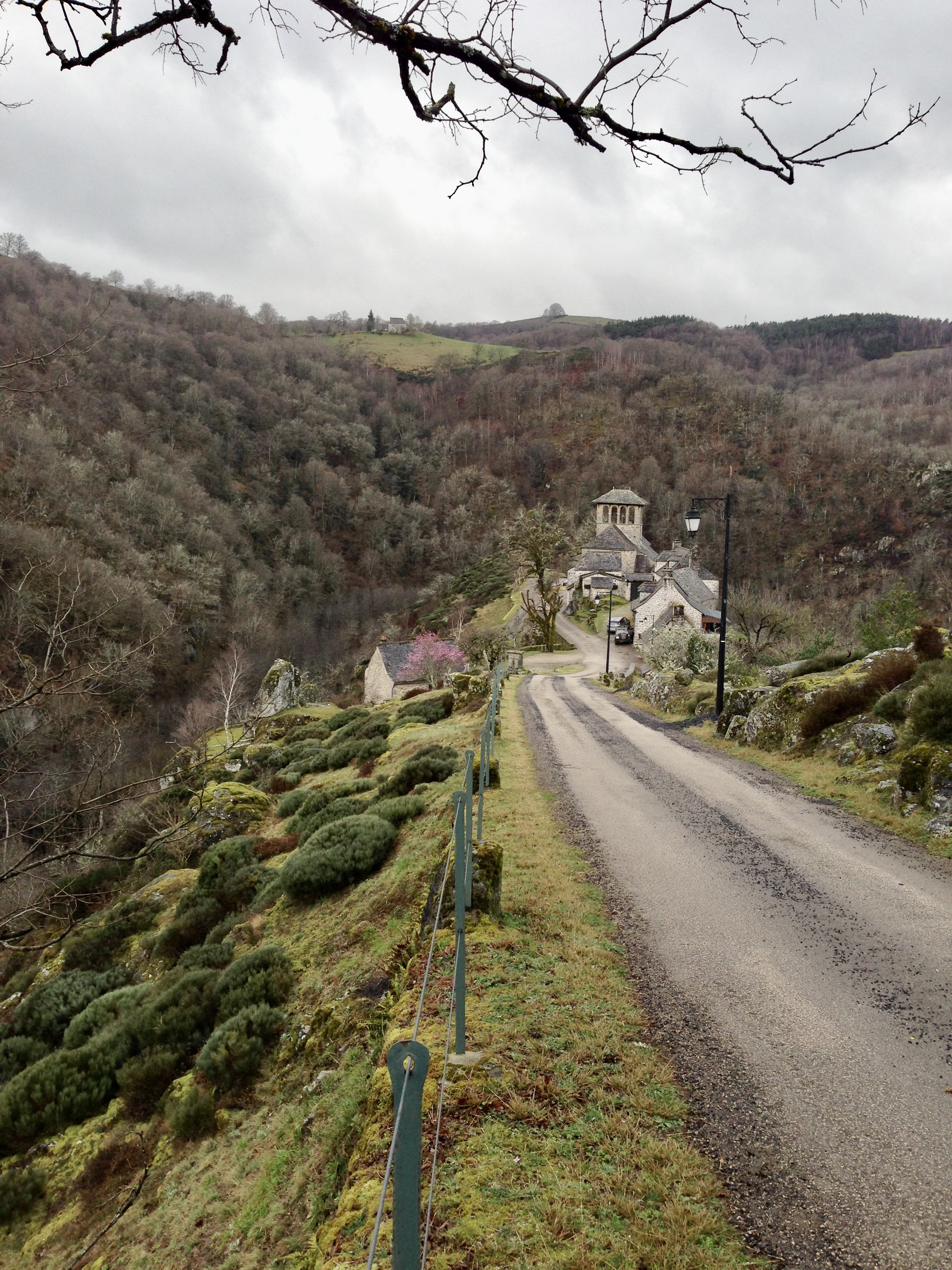
- Bes-Bédène in Campouriez

- Coat of arms
- Location of Campouriez
- Location within France Location within Occitanie
- Coordinates: 44°41′25″N 2°36′26″E
- Country: France
- Region: Occitania
- Department: Aveyron
- Arrondissement: Rodez
- Canton: Aubrac et Carladez

Government
  - Mayor (2020–2026): Christophe Delmas
- Area^{1}: 18.38 km^{2} (7.10 sq mi)
- Elevation: 510 m (1,670 ft)
- Highest elevation: 713 m (2,339 ft)
- Lowest elevation: 226 m (741 ft)
- Population (2023): 322
  - Density: 17.5/km^{2} (45.4/sq mi)
- Time zone: UTC+01:00 (CET)
  - Summer (DST): UTC+02:00 (CEST)
- INSEE/Postal code: 12048 /12460
- ^{1} French Land Register data, which excludes lakes, ponds, glaciers > 1 km^{2} (0.386 sq mi or 247 acres) and river estuaries.

Campouriez (French pronunciation: [kɑ̃puʁjɛs]; Occitan: Camporiès) is a commune in the Aveyron department of southern France. It is part of the former province of Rouergue, which utilised the Rouergat dialect of Languedocien Occitan. Inhabitants of Campouriez are called Campouriézois.

== Geography ==
The territory of this commune takes up a portion of the central-southern area of the Massif Central, on the Viadène plateau and near the gorge of the Truyère and the valley of the Lot. The village is located on a hilltop, surrounded by the hamlets la Vaysse, la Joanie, le Bruel, Nigole, Banhars and especially Bez-Bédène.

== History ==
The name Campouriez comes from "champ d'or," Occitan for "field of gold."

== Population ==
Historical population
Year	Pop.	±% p.a.
1968	540	—
1975	512	−0.76%
1982	500	−0.34%
1990	422	−2.10%
1999	393	−0.79%
2007	399	+0.19%
2012	367	−1.66%
2017	350	−0.94%
2023	322	−1.38%
Source: INSEE

== See also ==
- Communes of the Aveyron department
