= Château de Pruines =

Castle in France

Coordinates: 44°31′46.5″N 2°30′12.5″E

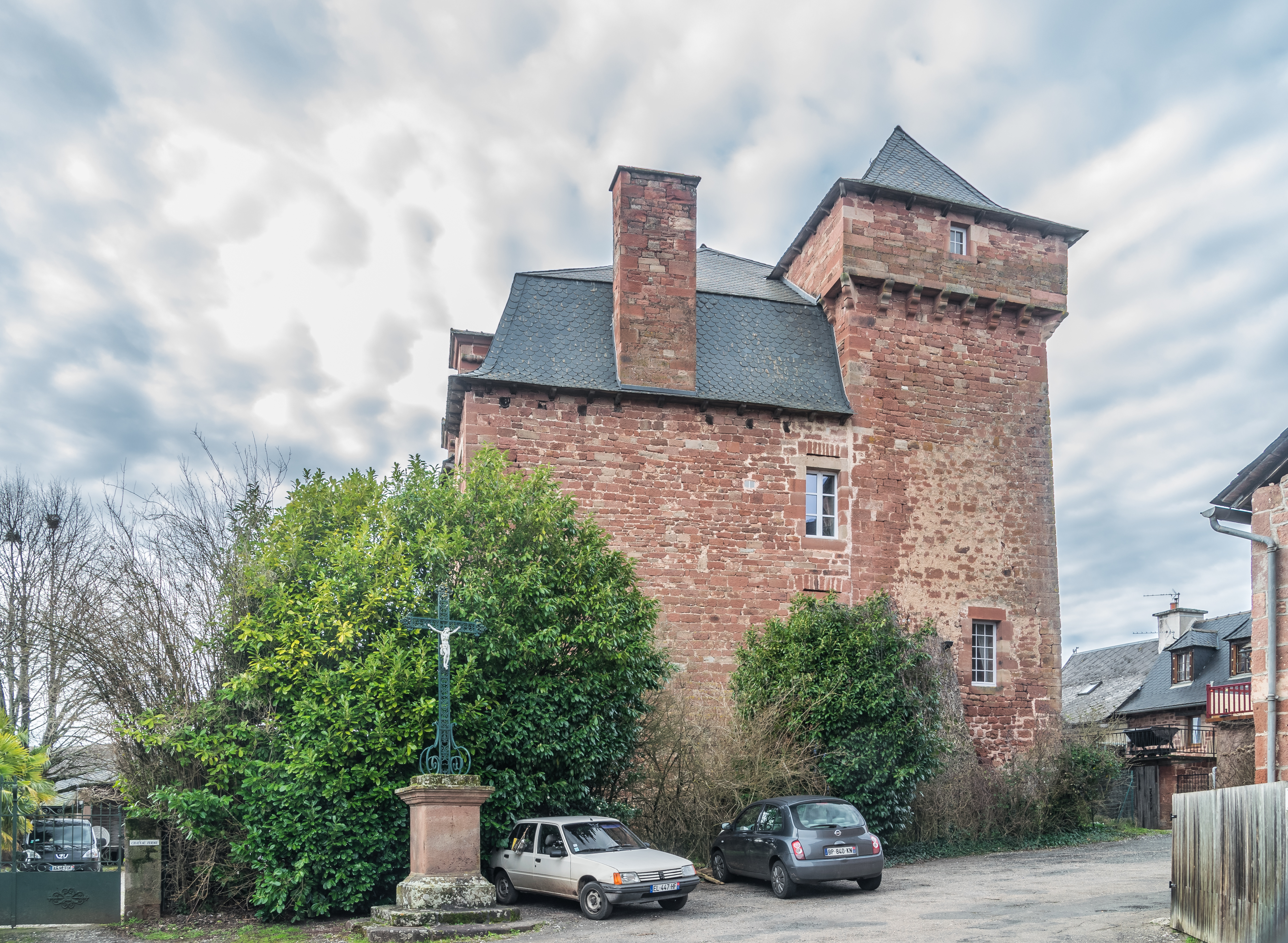
Castle of Pruines, 2018

The Château de Pruines is a castle in the French commune of Pruines in the Aveyron département.

The castle dates from the 15th century. Built in local red sandstone it consists of several parts: a main building, a tower and a stable. In the 16th century, interior work was undertaken to make the castle more comfortable. The ceilings, dating from the 17th century, have very colourful paintwork and sculpture.

The castle has been the property of a succession of families over the centuries. From the Arjac-Solages family it passed to the Marcenacs, who sold it to Jean-Antoine Bancalis (1655–1706) in the 17th century. After the seizure of property during the French Revolution, the Bancaris bought it back. At the start of the 20th century, it was sold to the town and became the mairie and a public school until 1954. Between 1974 and 1999 it was renovated by a private owner who made it into an auberge de jeunesse (youth hostel) and organised craft courses. Today, privately owned, the castle has been restored and furnished in period style; the kitchen includes a collection of ancient pottery and magnificent copper utensils.

The Château de Pruines is one of a group of 23 castles and sites in Aveyron which have joined to provide a tourist itinerary as La Route des Seigneurs du Rouergue.

== See also ==
- List of castles in France

== Sources ==
- MAZARS, Jacky & ROLLAND, François Pruines et Prunols, l'histoire d'un village du Rouergue à travers les siècles l'Association des Amis de Pruines (in French)
