= Laguiole =

Commune in Occitanie, France

- Commune
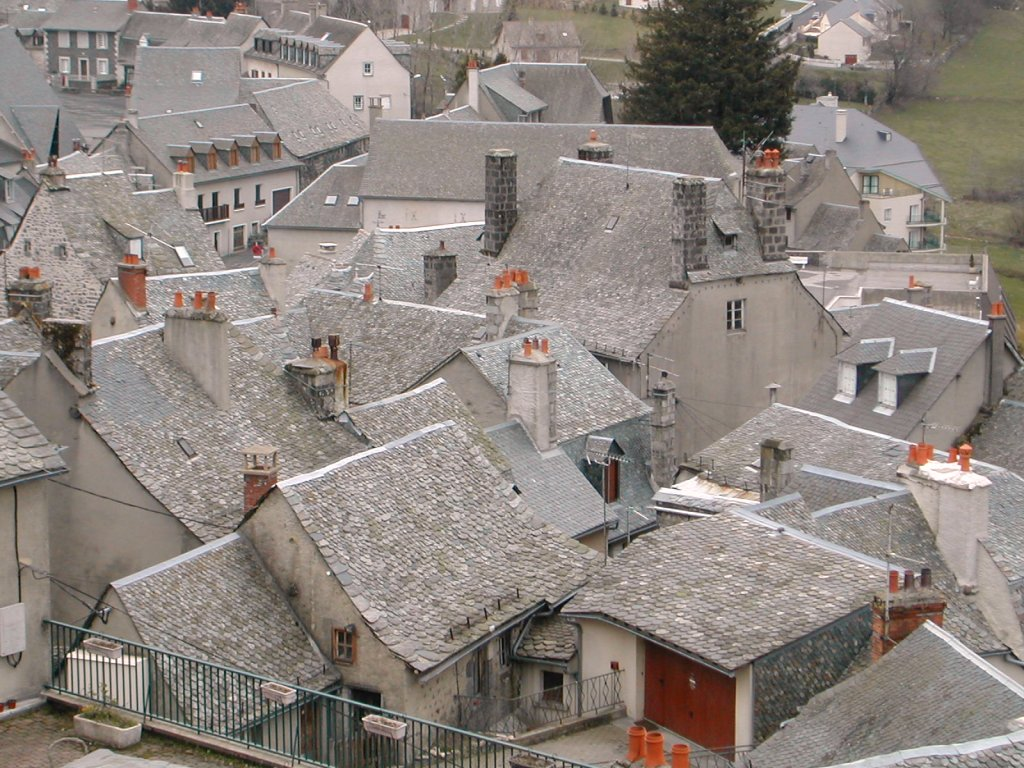
- The slate rooftops in Laguiole

- Coat of arms
- Location of Laguiole
- Location within France Location within Occitanie
- Coordinates: 44°41′06″N 2°50′53″E
- Country: France
- Region: Occitania
- Department: Aveyron
- Arrondissement: Rodez
- Canton: Aubrac et Carladez

Government
  - Mayor (2020–2026): Vincent Alazard
- Area^{1}: 63.06 km^{2} (24.35 sq mi)
- Elevation: 1,000 m (3,300 ft)
- Highest elevation: 1,342 m (4,403 ft)
- Lowest elevation: 868 m (2,848 ft)
- Population (2023): 1,207
  - Density: 19.14/km^{2} (49.57/sq mi)
- Time zone: UTC+01:00 (CET)
  - Summer (DST): UTC+02:00 (CEST)
- INSEE/Postal code: 12119 /12210
- Website: www.laguiole12.fr
- ^{1} French Land Register data, which excludes lakes, ponds, glaciers > 1 km^{2} (0.386 sq mi or 247 acres) and river estuaries.

Laguiole ([lajɔl]; La Guiòla [laˈjɔlɔ] in Languedocien) is a commune in the southern French department of Aveyron.

The town's architectural heritage includes four buildings listed as historical monuments: the Church of Saint Matthew in Laguiole, listed in 1927; the Château de la Boissonnade, listed in 1928; the former presbytery of Laguiole (hospice), also listed in 1928; and the Château d'Oustrac, listed in 2007.

== Geography ==
=== Location ===
The town is located in the Massif Central, on the central plateau of the Aubrac region of Aveyron, classified as a Natura 2000 protected area.

It is known for its Laguiole cheese, which has an Appellation d'Origine Contrôlée (label of guaranteed origin), and as the birthplace of the Laguiole knife. The name of the village comes from la gleisòla, meaning a little church.

=== Climate ===
In 2020, the climate is classified as Cfb (see the Köppen-Geiger classification) for the period 1988–2017, namely a temperate climate with cool summers and no dry season. Furthermore, Météo-France published a new typology of the climates of metropolitan France in 2020, in which the municipality is exposed to a mountain or mountain margin climate. Southeast of the Massif Central, characterized by an annual rainfall between 1000 and 1500 mm, less in summer, more in autumn. It is also included in the zone H2c under the environmental regulations 2020 for new building construction.

For the period 1971–2000, the average annual temperature was 8.4 °C, with an annual temperature range of 7.4 °C. The average annual rainfall was 1279 mm, with 11.5 days of rainfall in January and 7.2 days in July. For the period 1991–2020, the average annual temperature observed at the nearest Météo-France weather station, in the commune of Saint-Côme-d'Olt, 19 km as the crow flies, is 12.5 °C with an average annual rainfall of 951.5 mm.

== Population ==
Historical population
Year	Pop.	±% p.a.
1968	1,282	—
1975	1,291	+0.10%
1982	1,231	−0.68%
1990	1,264	+0.33%
1999	1,248	−0.14%
2007	1,261	+0.13%
2012	1,230	−0.50%
2017	1,242	+0.19%
2023	1,207	−0.48%
Source: INSEE

== History ==
=== Middle Ages ===
The Rouergue was conquered in 767 by Pepin the Short and the Dukes of Aquitaine. It remained under the control of the Counts of Rouergue until the death of Jeanne of Toulouse and her husband Alphonse of Poitiers in 1271. The county then came under the direct control of the kings of France. The Albigensians seized it in 1208 and were driven out in 1210 by Jean de Beaumont, Lord of Thénières. The English captured Fort Laguiole and its surroundings in 1355 but were driven out a few years later. Laguiole was one of the four castellanies of Rouergue. Besides Laguiole, it included Curières and La Roquette-Bonneval. By letters patent issued on 29 May 1369, King Charles V of France, while at the Bois de Vincennes, granted the castellany of Laguiole and the three others of Rouergue, including Laguiole, to Jean d'Armagnac, who had helped him fight against the English.

=== Modern Era ===
The Huguenots of Chirac (Lozère) pillaged Laguiole on 10 January 1588. The County of Rodez passed by inheritance to the House of Albret. The county reverted to the royal domain when Henry of Navarre, Count of Rodez, became King Henry IV of France in 1589. The Fort of Laguiole was still standing according to a document by the notary Brunel in 1620, but no longer existed by 1735.

== See also ==
- Communes of the Aveyron department
