= Rodez–Aveyron Airport =

Rodez–Aveyron Airport Aéroport de Rodez–Aveyron
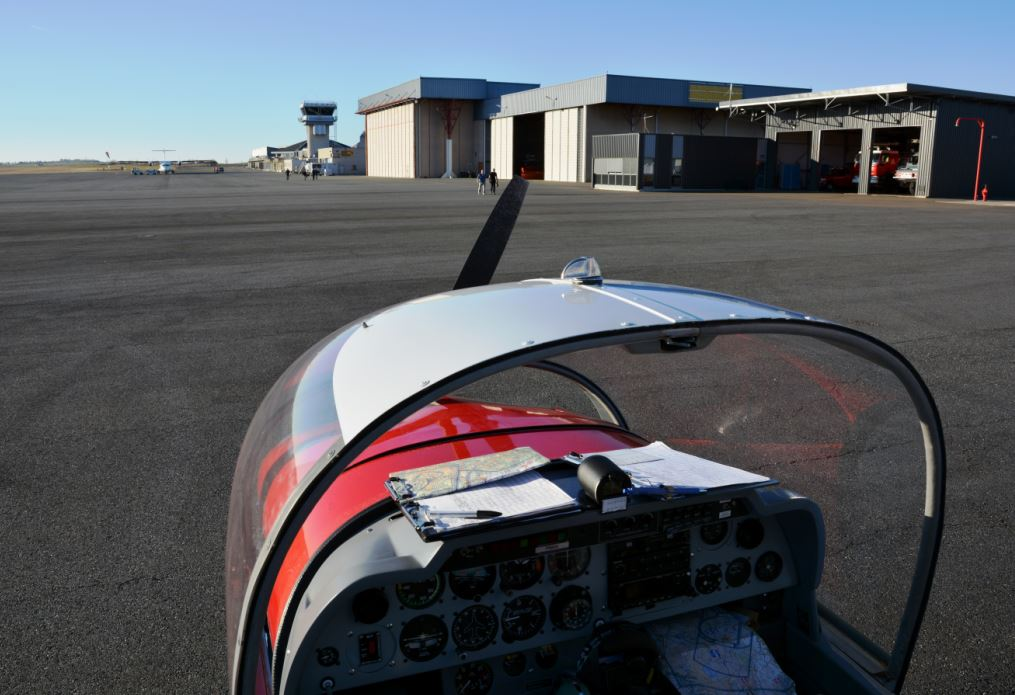
- IATA: RDZ; ICAO: LFCR

Summary
- Airport type: Public
- Operator: Chambre du Commerce et d'Industrie de Rodez
- Location: Rodez, France
- Elevation AMSL: 1,910 ft (580 m)
- Coordinates: 44°24′38.9″N 02°28′59.5″E
- Website: www.aeroport-rodez.fr

Map
- Location of airport in the Occitanie region LFCR (France)

Runways
Direction	Length		Surface
Direction	m	ft	Surface
13/31	2,100	6,890	Asphalt
13/31	800	2,625	Grass

Statistics (2007)
- Passengers: 73,000
- Freight (tons): for 2009

Rodez–Aveyron Airport (IATA: RDZ, ICAO: LFCR; French: Aéroport de Rodez–Aveyron) is a French regional airport, located on the territory of the commune of Salles-la-Source approximately 10 km outside the centre of Rodez, the departmental capital of Aveyron, France. It has one international runway of 2,100 m in length, as well as a second, smaller runway of 800 m. It is a commodious airport for reaching the departments of Aveyron, Tarn, Tarn-et-Garonne, Lot, Hérault, Gard, Lozère and Cantal.

== History ==
In 1971, the Rodez–Aveyron Airport was founded and managed by SAEML Air 12 which comprised the CCI of Rodez, Aveyron General Council, and the main regional banks. In March 2002, the Paris Orly connection by Air France commenced and was operated by Brit Air (a regional airline operating scheduled services as an Air France franchise). In 2003, there was an extension of the runway to 2,100 m and the installation of a new Instrument Landing System (ILS). In January 2008, there was an extension of the parking to 1000 places. In 2009, there was an extension of the airport and the creation of a new departure lounge.

== Airlines and destinations ==
The following airlines operate regular scheduled and charter flights at Rodez–Aveyron Airport:

Airlines	Destinations
Ryanair	Seasonal: Charleroi, London–Stansted
Volotea	Paris–Orly; Seasonal: Ajaccio, Bastia, Figari, Lille, Palma de Mallorca, Porto, Strasbourg
