= Salles-la-Source =

Commune in Occitanie, France

Salles-la-Source Salas Comtals (Occitan)
- Commune
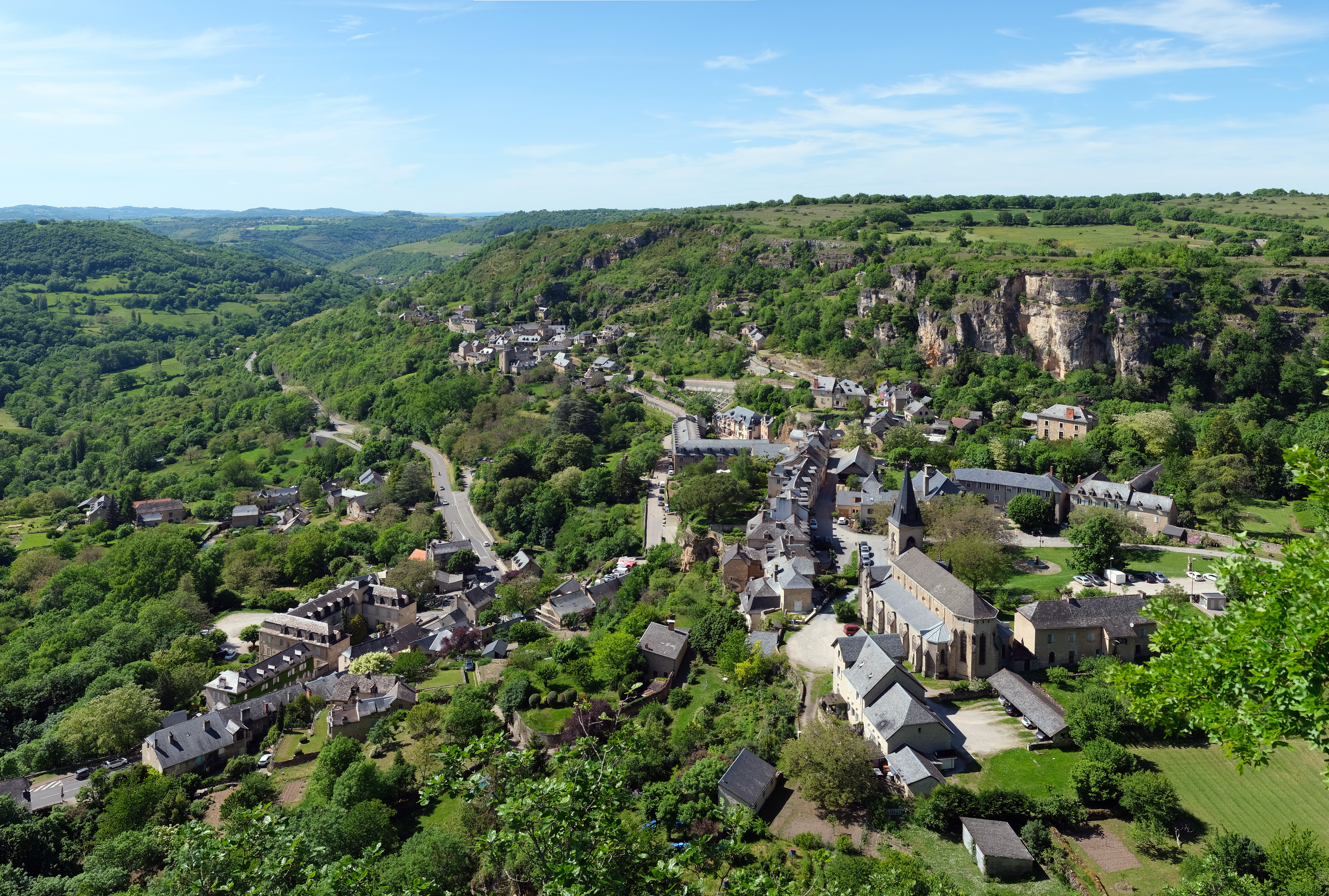
- Location of Salles-la-Source
- Location within France Location within Occitanie
- Coordinates: 44°26′10″N 2°30′51″E
- Country: France
- Region: Occitania
- Department: Aveyron
- Arrondissement: Rodez
- Canton: Vallon

Government
  - Mayor (2020–2026): Jean-Louis Alibert
- Area^{1}: 78.03 km^{2} (30.13 sq mi)
- Highest elevation: 613 m (2,011 ft)
- Lowest elevation: 290 m (950 ft)
- Population (2023): 2,333
  - Density: 29.90/km^{2} (77.44/sq mi)
- Time zone: UTC+01:00 (CET)
  - Summer (DST): UTC+02:00 (CEST)
- INSEE/Postal code: 12254 /12330
- ^{1} French Land Register data, which excludes lakes, ponds, glaciers > 1 km^{2} (0.386 sq mi or 247 acres) and river estuaries.

Salles-la-Source (French pronunciation: [sal la suʁs]), historically Salles-Comtaux (until the French Revolution; Occitan: Salas Comtals or Las Salas del Comtal), is a commune in the Aveyron department in the Occitania region in Southern France.

Rodez–Aveyron Airport is largely located in Salles-la-Source.

== Demographics ==
Historical population
Year	Pop.	±% p.a.
1968	1,141	—
1975	1,187	+0.57%
1982	1,294	+1.24%
1990	1,594	+2.64%
1999	1,800	+1.36%
2007	1,982	+1.21%
2012	2,131	+1.46%
2017	2,220	+0.82%
2023	2,333	+0.83%
Source: INSEE

== See also ==
- Communes of the Aveyron department
