= Clairvaux-d'Aveyron =

Commune in Occitanie, France

- Commune
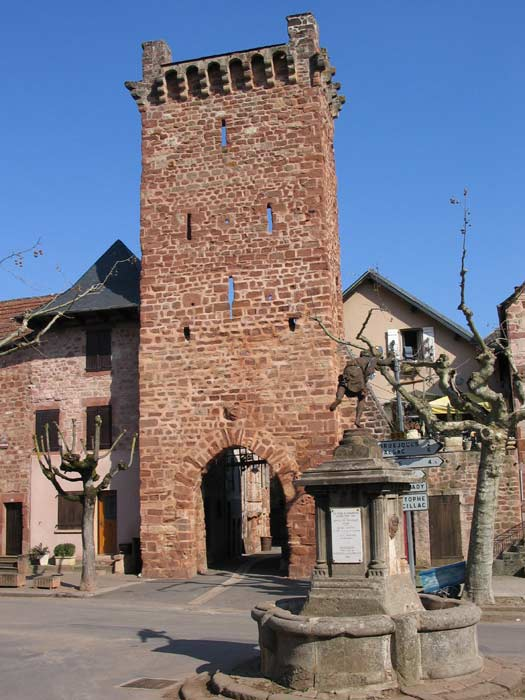
- The entrance gate in Clairvaux-d'Aveyron
- Location of Clairvaux-d'Aveyron
- Location within France Location within Occitanie
- Coordinates: 44°25′42″N 2°24′41″E
- Country: France
- Region: Occitania
- Department: Aveyron
- Arrondissement: Rodez
- Canton: Vallon

Government
  - Mayor (2020–2026): Jean-Marie Lacombe
- Area^{1}: 25.14 km^{2} (9.71 sq mi)
- Elevation: 432 m (1,417 ft)
- Highest elevation: 734 m (2,408 ft)
- Lowest elevation: 319 m (1,047 ft)
- Population (2023): 1,158
  - Density: 46.06/km^{2} (119.3/sq mi)
- Time zone: UTC+01:00 (CET)
  - Summer (DST): UTC+02:00 (CEST)
- INSEE/Postal code: 12066 /12330
- ^{1} French Land Register data, which excludes lakes, ponds, glaciers > 1 km^{2} (0.386 sq mi or 247 acres) and river estuaries.

Clairvaux-d'Aveyron is a commune in the Aveyron department in southern France.

== Population ==
Historical population
Year	Pop.	±% p.a.
1968	816	—
1975	839	+0.40%
1982	923	+1.37%
1990	911	−0.16%
1999	1,039	+1.47%
2007	1,127	+1.02%
2012	1,161	+0.60%
2017	1,144	−0.29%
2023	1,158	+0.20%
Source: INSEE

== See also ==
- Communes of the Aveyron department
