= Mouret, Aveyron =

Commune in Occitanie, France

Mouret
- Commune
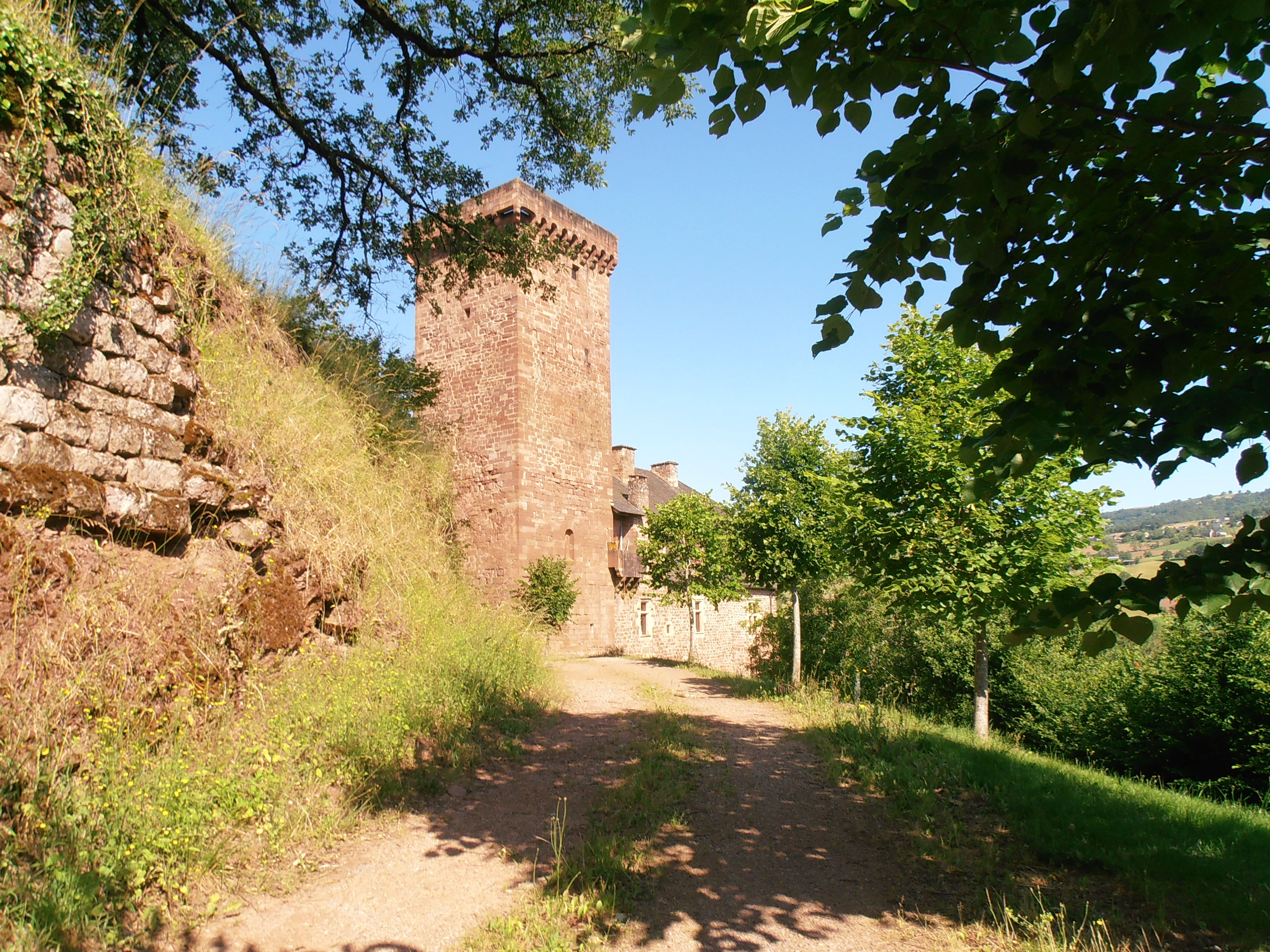
- The Château of La Servairie
- Location of Mouret
- Location within France Location within Occitanie
- Coordinates: 44°31′05″N 2°30′56″E
- Country: France
- Region: Occitania
- Department: Aveyron
- Arrondissement: Rodez
- Canton: Vallon

Government
  - Mayor (2020–2026): Gabriel Issalys
- Area^{1}: 31.61 km^{2} (12.20 sq mi)
- Elevation: 360 m (1,180 ft)
- Highest elevation: 608 m (1,995 ft)
- Lowest elevation: 269 m (883 ft)
- Population (2023): 560
  - Density: 18/km^{2} (46/sq mi)
- Time zone: UTC+01:00 (CET)
  - Summer (DST): UTC+02:00 (CEST)
- INSEE/Postal code: 12161 /12330
- ^{1} French Land Register data, which excludes lakes, ponds, glaciers > 1 km^{2} (0.386 sq mi or 247 acres) and river estuaries.

Mouret (French pronunciation: [muʁɛ]; Occitan: Moret) is a commune in Aveyron, a department in southern France.

== Population ==
Historical population
Year	Pop.	±% p.a.
1968	594	—
1975	545	−1.22%
1982	505	−1.08%
1990	464	−1.05%
1999	476	+0.28%
2007	552	+1.87%
2012	509	−1.61%
2017	538	+1.11%
2023	560	+0.67%
Source: INSEE

== See also ==
- Communes of the Aveyron department
