= Mur-de-Barrez =

Commune in Occitanie, France

- Commune
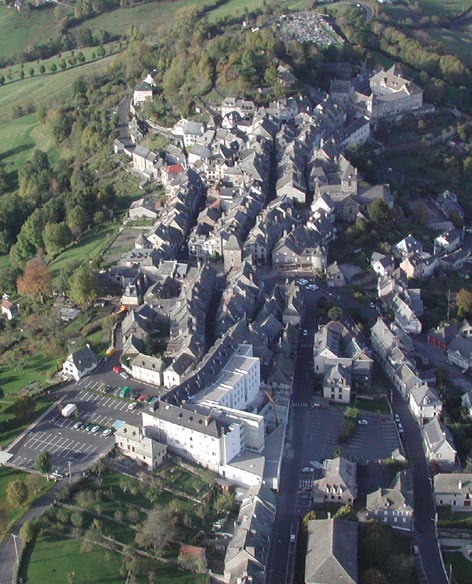
- An aerial view of Mur-de-Barrez

- Coat of arms
- Location of Mur-de-Barrez
- Location within France Location within Occitanie
- Coordinates: 44°50′35″N 2°39′44″E
- Country: France
- Region: Occitania
- Department: Aveyron
- Arrondissement: Rodez
- Canton: Aubrac et Carladez

Government
  - Mayor (2020–2026): Pierre Ignace
- Area^{1}: 20.18 km^{2} (7.79 sq mi)
- Elevation: 780 m (2,560 ft)
- Highest elevation: 953 m (3,127 ft)
- Lowest elevation: 653 m (2,142 ft)
- Population (2023): 693
  - Density: 34.3/km^{2} (88.9/sq mi)
- Time zone: UTC+01:00 (CET)
  - Summer (DST): UTC+02:00 (CEST)
- INSEE/Postal code: 12164 /12600
- ^{1} French Land Register data, which excludes lakes, ponds, glaciers > 1 km^{2} (0.386 sq mi or 247 acres) and river estuaries.

Mur-de-Barrez (French pronunciation: [myʁ də baʁɛs]; Occitan: Lo Mur de Barrés) is a commune in the Aveyron department in southern France.

== Population ==
Historical population
Year	Pop.	±% p.a.
1968	1,280	—
1975	1,305	+0.28%
1982	1,235	−0.78%
1990	1,109	−1.34%
1999	880	−2.54%
2007	821	−0.86%
2012	800	−0.52%
2017	759	−1.05%
2023	693	−1.50%
Source: INSEE

== See also ==
- Communes of the Aveyron department
