= Lacroix-Barrez =

Commune in Occitanie, France

- Commune
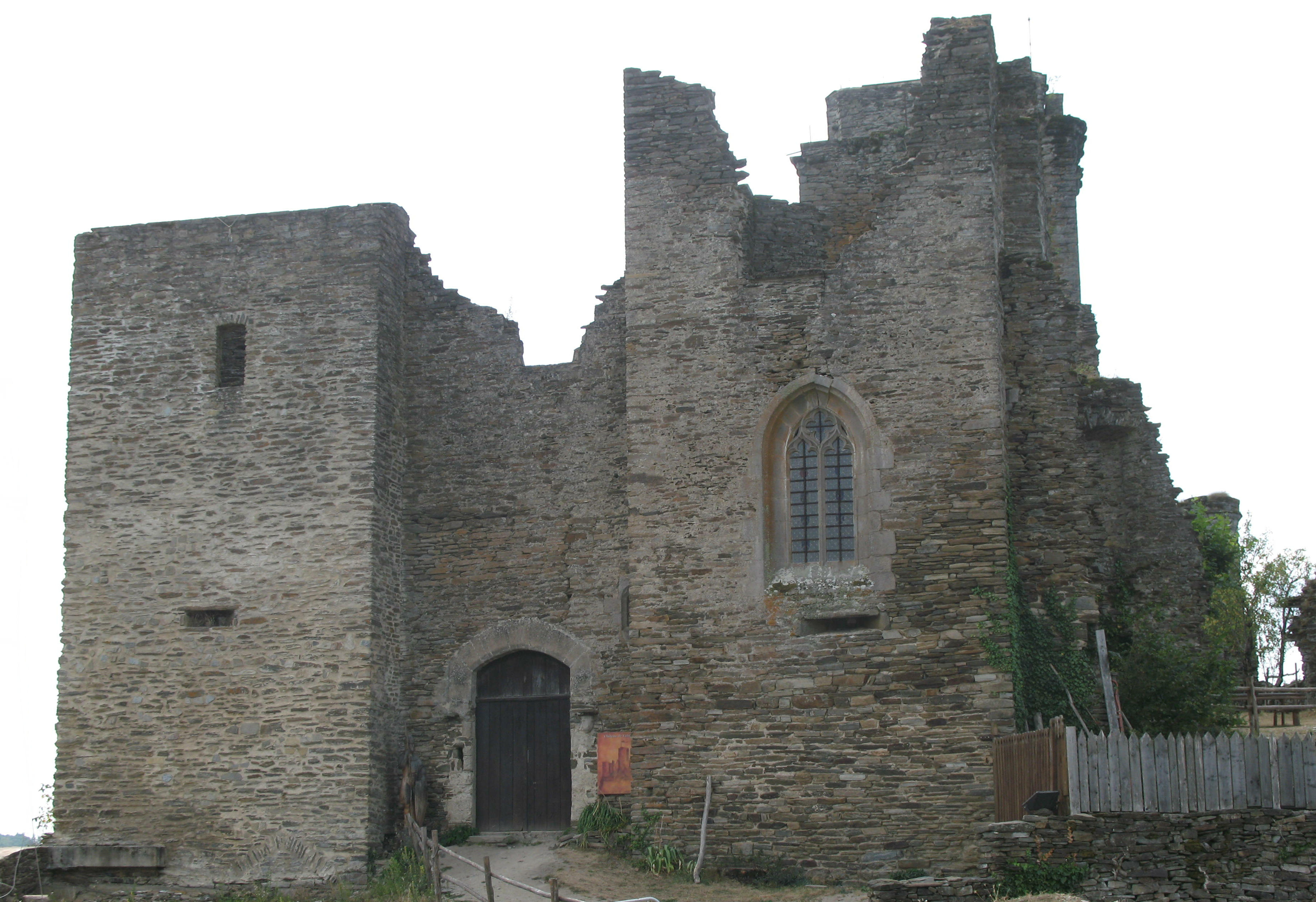
- The Château of Valon
- Location of Lacroix-Barrez
- Location within France Location within Occitanie
- Coordinates: 44°46′40″N 2°38′12″E
- Country: France
- Region: Occitania
- Department: Aveyron
- Arrondissement: Rodez
- Canton: Aubrac et Carladez

Government
  - Mayor (2020–2026): Jean Delmas
- Area^{1}: 28.01 km^{2} (10.81 sq mi)
- Elevation: 774 m (2,539 ft)
- Highest elevation: 804 m (2,638 ft)
- Lowest elevation: 300 m (980 ft)
- Population (2023): 531
  - Density: 19.0/km^{2} (49.1/sq mi)
- Time zone: UTC+01:00 (CET)
  - Summer (DST): UTC+02:00 (CEST)
- INSEE/Postal code: 12118 /12600
- ^{1} French Land Register data, which excludes lakes, ponds, glaciers > 1 km^{2} (0.386 sq mi or 247 acres) and river estuaries.

Lacroix-Barrez (French pronunciation: [lakʁwa baʁɛs]; Occitan: La Crotz Bola) is a commune in the Aveyron department in southern France.

== Population ==
Historical population
Year	Pop.	±% p.a.
1968	662	—
1975	613	−1.09%
1982	632	+0.44%
1990	574	−1.20%
1999	550	−0.47%
2007	521	−0.67%
2012	475	−1.83%
2017	506	+1.27%
2023	531	+0.81%
Source: INSEE

== See also ==
- Communes of the Aveyron department
