= Pruines =

Commune in Occitanie, France

- Commune
- Location of Pruines
- Location within France Location within Occitanie
- Coordinates: 44°31′53″N 2°30′14″E
- Country: France
- Region: Occitania
- Department: Aveyron
- Arrondissement: Rodez
- Canton: Vallon

Government
  - Mayor (2020–2026): Christian Pouget
- Area^{1}: 18.88 km^{2} (7.29 sq mi)
- Elevation: 440 m (1,440 ft)
- Highest elevation: 703 m (2,306 ft)
- Lowest elevation: 264 m (866 ft)
- Population (2023): 289
  - Density: 15.3/km^{2} (39.6/sq mi)
- Time zone: UTC+01:00 (CET)
  - Summer (DST): UTC+02:00 (CEST)
- INSEE/Postal code: 12193 /12320
- ^{1} French Land Register data, which excludes lakes, ponds, glaciers > 1 km^{2} (0.386 sq mi or 247 acres) and river estuaries.

Pruines (French pronunciation: [pʁɥin]; Occitan: Prunas) is a commune in the Aveyron department in southern France.

The Château de Pruines is a castle dating to the 15th century, much modified over the centuries.

== Population ==
Historical population
Year	Pop.	±% p.a.
1968	386	—
1975	349	−1.43%
1982	330	−0.80%
1990	257	−3.08%
1999	239	−0.80%
2007	270	+1.54%
2012	302	+2.27%
2017	297	−0.33%
2023	289	−0.45%
Source: INSEE

== See also ==
- Communes of the Aveyron department
