= Nauviale =

Commune in Occitanie, France

- Commune
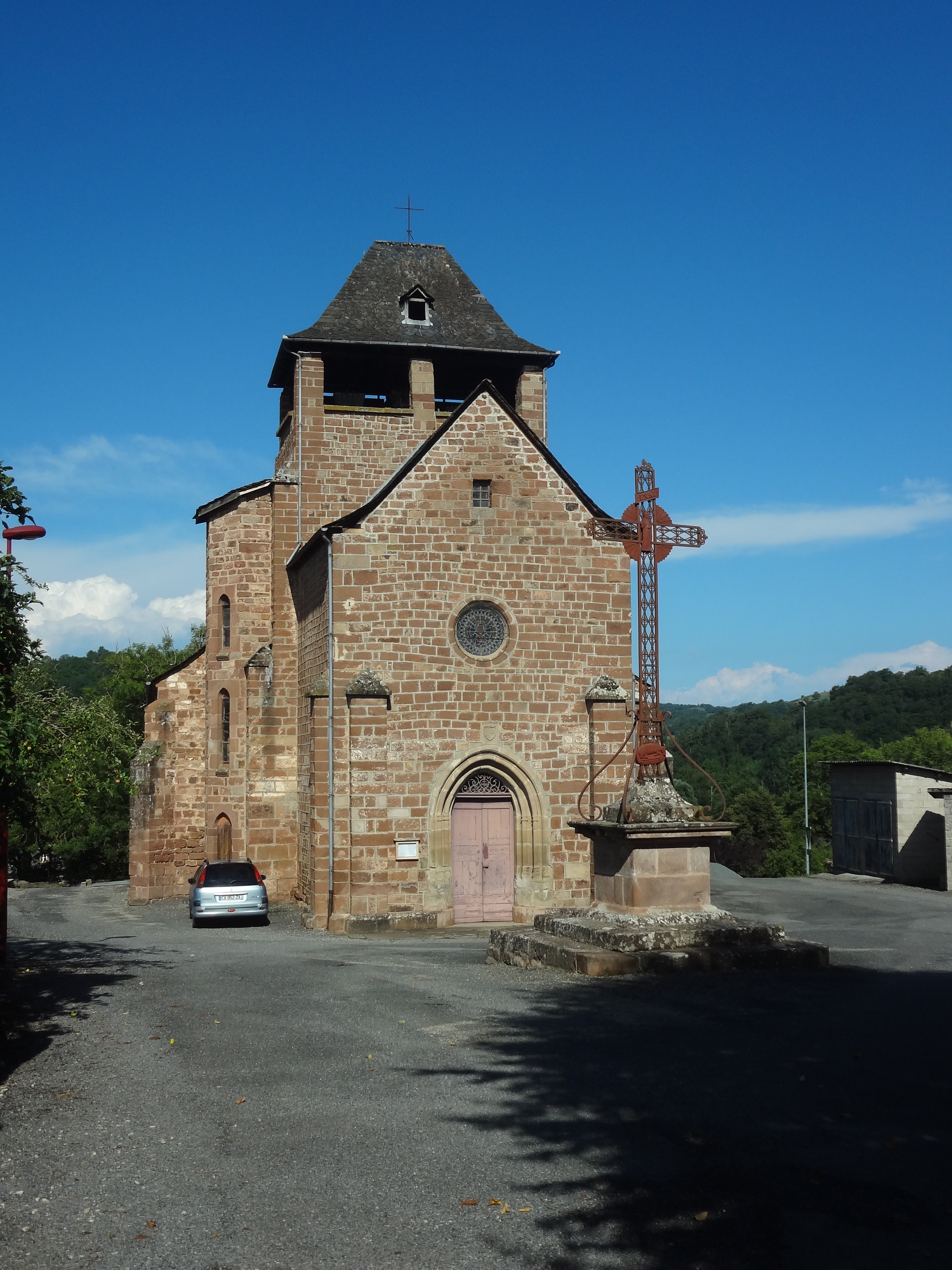
- The church in Nauviale

- Coat of arms
- Location of Nauviale
- Location within France Location within Occitanie
- Coordinates: 44°31′15″N 2°25′46″E
- Country: France
- Region: Occitania
- Department: Aveyron
- Arrondissement: Rodez
- Canton: Vallon
- Intercommunality: Conques-Marcillac

Government
  - Mayor (2020–2026): Sylvain Couffignal
- Area^{1}: 26.19 km^{2} (10.11 sq mi)
- Elevation: 263 m (863 ft)
- Highest elevation: 485 m (1,591 ft)
- Lowest elevation: 235 m (771 ft)
- Population (2023): 577
  - Density: 22.0/km^{2} (57.1/sq mi)
- Time zone: UTC+01:00 (CET)
  - Summer (DST): UTC+02:00 (CEST)
- INSEE/Postal code: 12171 /12330
- ^{1} French Land Register data, which excludes lakes, ponds, glaciers > 1 km^{2} (0.386 sq mi or 247 acres) and river estuaries.

Nauviale (French pronunciation: [novjal]; Occitan: Nòuviala) is a commune in the Aveyron department in southern France.

== Population ==
Historical population
Year	Pop.	±% p.a.
1968	526	—
1975	520	−0.16%
1982	502	−0.50%
1990	465	−0.95%
1999	454	−0.27%
2007	541	+2.22%
2012	536	−0.19%
2017	553	+0.63%
2023	577	+0.71%
Source: INSEE

== See also ==
- Communes of the Aveyron department
