= Canton of Vallon =

Coordinates: 44.44°N 2.51°E

- Canton
- Situation of the canton of Vallon in the department of Aveyron
- Country: France
- Region: Occitania
- Department: Aveyron
- No. of communes: {{{nbcomm}}}
- Population (2023): 12,961
- INSEE code: 1221

The canton of Vallon is an administrative division of the Aveyron department, southern France. It was created at the French canton reorganisation which came into effect in March 2015. Its seat is in Salles-la-Source.

It consists of the following communes:

1. Clairvaux-d'Aveyron
2. Druelle Balsac
3. Marcillac-Vallon
4. Mouret
5. Muret-le-Château
6. Nauviale
7. Pruines
8. Saint-Christophe-Vallon
9. Salles-la-Source
10. Valady
