= Arrondissement of Rodez =

Coordinates: 44.33°N 2.57°E

Rodez
- Arrondissement
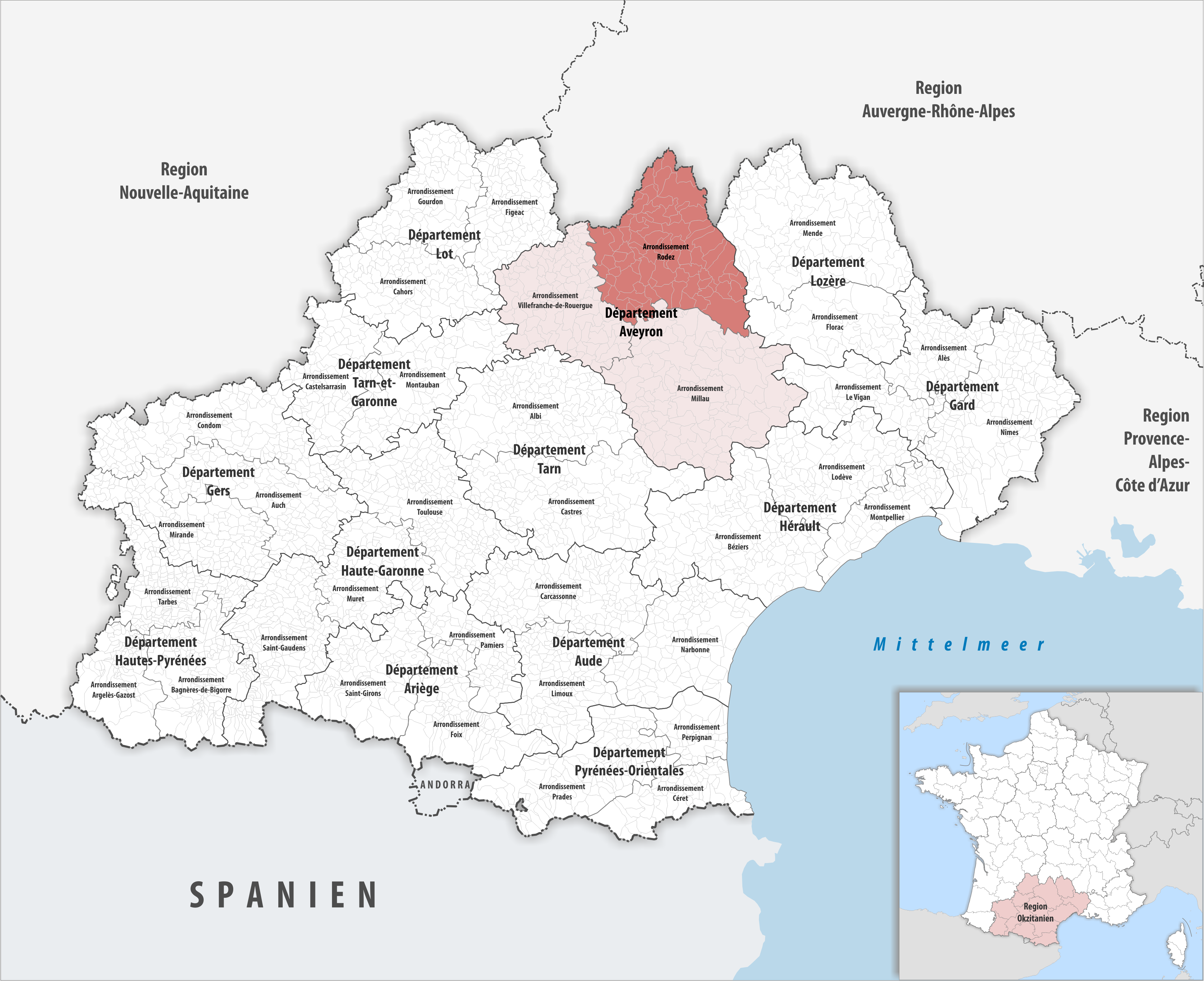
- Location within the region Occitanie
- Country: France
- Region: Occitania
- Department: Aveyron
- No. of communes: {{{nbcomm}}}
- Area: 2,869.7 km^{2} (1,108.0 sq mi)
- Population (2023): 112,500
  - Density: 39.20/km^{2} (101.5/sq mi)
- INSEE code: 122

The arrondissement of Rodez is an arrondissement of France in the Aveyron department in the Occitanie region. It has 79 communes. Its population is 112,628 (2021), and its area is 2,869.7 km^{2} (1,108.0 sq mi).

== Composition ==
The communes of the arrondissement of Rodez, and their INSEE codes, are:

1. Argences-en-Aubrac (12223)
2. Bertholène (12026)
3. Bessuéjouls (12027)
4. Bozouls (12033)
5. Brommat (12036)
6. Campagnac (12047)
7. Campouriez (12048)
8. Campuac (12049)
9. Cantoin (12051)
10. La Capelle-Bonance (12055)
11. Cassuéjouls (12058)
12. Castelnau-de-Mandailles (12061)
13. Le Cayrol (12064)
14. Clairvaux-d'Aveyron (12066)
15. Condom-d'Aubrac (12074)
16. Conques-en-Rouergue (12076)
17. Coubisou (12079)
18. Curières (12088)
19. Druelle Balsac (12090)
20. Entraygues-sur-Truyère (12094)
21. Espalion (12096)
22. Espeyrac (12097)
23. Estaing (12098)
24. Le Fel (12093)
25. Florentin-la-Capelle (12103)
26. Gabriac (12106)
27. Gaillac-d'Aveyron (12107)
28. Golinhac (12110)
29. Huparlac (12116)
30. Lacroix-Barrez (12118)
31. Laguiole (12119)
32. Laissac-Sévérac-l'Église (12120)
33. Lassouts (12124)
34. La Loubière (12131)
35. Luc-la-Primaube (12133)
36. Marcillac-Vallon (12138)
37. Le Monastère (12146)
38. Montézic (12151)
39. Montpeyroux (12156)
40. Montrozier (12157)
41. Mouret (12161)
42. Mur-de-Barrez (12164)
43. Muret-le-Château (12165)
44. Murols (12166)
45. Nauviale (12171)
46. Le Nayrac (12172)
47. Olemps (12174)
48. Onet-le-Château (12176)
49. Palmas-d'Aveyron (12177)
50. Pierrefiche (12182)
51. Pomayrols (12184)
52. Prades-d'Aubrac (12187)
53. Pruines (12193)
54. Rodelle (12201)
55. Rodez (12202)
56. Saint-Amans-des-Cots (12209)
57. Saint-Christophe-Vallon (12215)
58. Saint-Chély-d'Aubrac (12214)
59. Saint-Côme-d'Olt (12216)
60. Sainte-Eulalie-d'Olt (12219)
61. Sainte-Radegonde (12241)
62. Saint-Félix-de-Lunel (12221)
63. Saint-Geniez-d'Olt-et-d'Aubrac (12224)
64. Saint-Hippolyte (12226)
65. Saint-Laurent-d'Olt (12237)
66. Saint-Martin-de-Lenne (12239)
67. Saint-Saturnin-de-Lenne (12247)
68. Saint-Symphorien-de-Thénières (12250)
69. Salles-la-Source (12254)
70. Sébazac-Concourès (12264)
71. Sébrazac (12265)
72. Sénergues (12268)
73. Sévérac-d'Aveyron (12270)
74. Soulages-Bonneval (12273)
75. Taussac (12277)
76. Thérondels (12280)
77. Valady (12288)
78. Villecomtal (12298)
79. Vimenet (12303)

== History ==
The arrondissement of Rodez was created in 1800. At the January 2017 reorganization of the arrondissements of Aveyron, it lost 19 communes to the arrondissement of Millau and 34 communes to the arrondissement of Villefranche-de-Rouergue, and it gained six communes from the arrondissement of Millau.

As a result of the reorganisation of the cantons of France which came into effect in 2015, the borders of the cantons are no longer related to the borders of the arrondissements. The cantons of the arrondissement of Rodez were, as of January 2015:

1. Baraqueville-Sauveterre
2. Bozouls
3. Cassagnes-Bégonhès
4. Conques
5. Entraygues-sur-Truyère
6. Espalion
7. Estaing
8. Laguiole
9. Laissac
10. Marcillac-Vallon
11. Mur-de-Barrez
12. Naucelle
13. Pont-de-Salars
14. Réquista
15. Rignac
16. Rodez-Est
17. Rodez-Nord
18. Rodez-Ouest
19. Saint-Amans-des-Cots
20. Saint-Chély-d'Aubrac
21. Sainte-Geneviève-sur-Argence
22. Saint-Geniez-d'Olt
23. La Salvetat-Peyralès
