= Valady, Aveyron =

Commune in Occitanie, France

Valady
- Commune
- Coat of arms
- Location of Valady
- Location within France Location within Occitanie
- Coordinates: 44°27′22″N 2°25′38″E
- Country: France
- Region: Occitania
- Department: Aveyron
- Arrondissement: Rodez
- Canton: Vallon

Government
  - Mayor (2022–2026): Joël Gradels
- Area^{1}: 15.51 km^{2} (5.99 sq mi)
- Elevation: 340 m (1,120 ft)
- Highest elevation: 636 m (2,087 ft)
- Lowest elevation: 283 m (928 ft)
- Population (2023): 1,610
  - Density: 104/km^{2} (269/sq mi)
- Time zone: UTC+01:00 (CET)
  - Summer (DST): UTC+02:00 (CEST)
- INSEE/Postal code: 12288 /12330
- ^{1} French Land Register data, which excludes lakes, ponds, glaciers > 1 km^{2} (0.386 sq mi or 247 acres) and river estuaries.

Valady (French pronunciation: [valadi]; Occitan: Valadin) is a commune in the Aveyron department in southern France.

== See also ==
- Communes of the Aveyron department
