= Saint-Christophe-Vallon =

Commune in Occitanie, France

- Commune
- Location of Saint-Christophe-Vallon
- Location within France Location within Occitanie
- Coordinates: 44°28′19″N 2°24′46″E
- Country: France
- Region: Occitania
- Department: Aveyron
- Arrondissement: Rodez
- Canton: Vallon

Government
  - Mayor (2020–2026): Christian Gomez
- Area^{1}: 23.22 km^{2} (8.97 sq mi)
- Elevation: 350 m (1,150 ft)
- Highest elevation: 585 m (1,919 ft)
- Lowest elevation: 269 m (883 ft)
- Population (2023): 1,186
  - Density: 51.08/km^{2} (132.3/sq mi)
- Time zone: UTC+01:00 (CET)
  - Summer (DST): UTC+02:00 (CEST)
- INSEE/Postal code: 12215 /12330
- ^{1} French Land Register data, which excludes lakes, ponds, glaciers > 1 km^{2} (0.386 sq mi or 247 acres) and river estuaries.

Saint-Christophe-Vallon (French pronunciation: [sɛ̃ kʁistɔf valɔ̃]; Occitan: Sent Cristòfa) is a commune in the Aveyron department in southern France. Saint-Christophe station has rail connections to Brive-la-Gaillarde, Figeac and Rodez.

== Population ==
Historical population
Year	Pop.	±% p.a.
1968	872	—
1975	882	+0.16%
1982	920	+0.60%
1990	868	−0.72%
1999	1,002	+1.61%
2007	1,057	+0.67%
2012	1,138	+1.49%
2017	1,138	+0.00%
2023	1,186	+0.69%
Source: INSEE

== See also ==
- Communes of the Aveyron department
