= Marcillac-Vallon =

Commune in Occitanie, France

- Commune
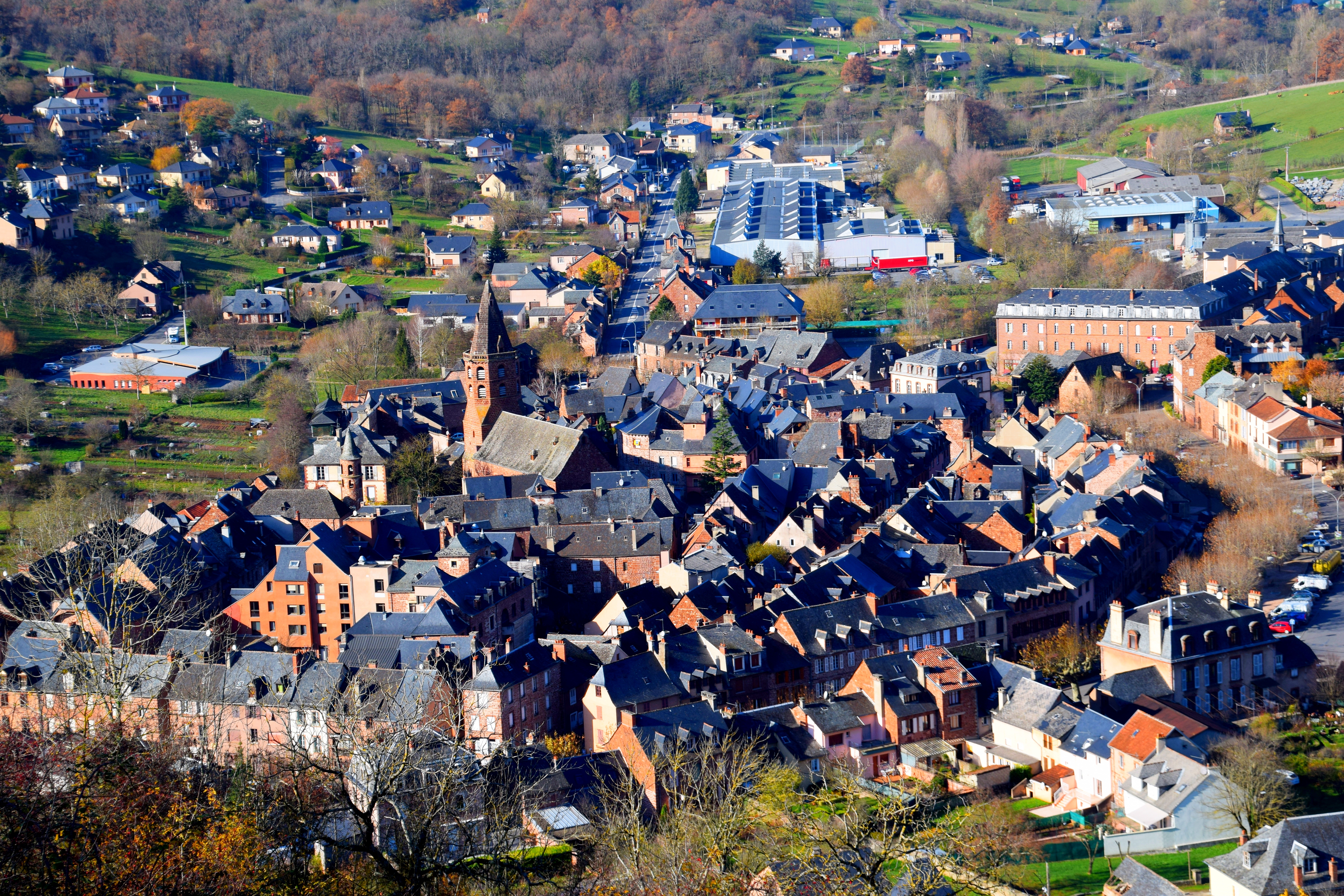
- A general view of Marcillac-Vallon

- Coat of arms
- Location of Marcillac-Vallon
- Location within France Location within Occitanie
- Coordinates: 44°28′29″N 2°27′55″E
- Country: France
- Region: Occitania
- Department: Aveyron
- Arrondissement: Rodez
- Canton: Vallon

Government
  - Mayor (2020–2026): Jean-Philippe Périé
- Area^{1}: 14.59 km^{2} (5.63 sq mi)
- Elevation: 275 m (902 ft)
- Highest elevation: 534 m (1,752 ft)
- Lowest elevation: 275 m (902 ft)
- Population (2023): 1,711
  - Density: 117.3/km^{2} (303.7/sq mi)
- Time zone: UTC+01:00 (CET)
  - Summer (DST): UTC+02:00 (CEST)
- INSEE/Postal code: 12138 /12330
- ^{1} French Land Register data, which excludes lakes, ponds, glaciers > 1 km^{2} (0.386 sq mi or 247 acres) and river estuaries.

Marcillac-Vallon (French pronunciation: [maʁsijak valɔ̃]; Occitan: Marcilhac) is a commune in the Aveyron department in southern France.

== Population ==
Historical population
Year	Pop.	±% p.a.
1968	1,370	—
1975	1,493	+1.24%
1982	1,564	+0.67%
1990	1,485	−0.65%
1999	1,532	+0.35%
2007	1,636	+0.82%
2012	1,672	+0.44%
2017	1,707	+0.42%
2023	1,711	+0.04%
Source: INSEE

== See also ==
- Communes of the Aveyron department
