= Aveyron =

Department in Occitania, France

Aveyron Avairon (Occitan)
- Department
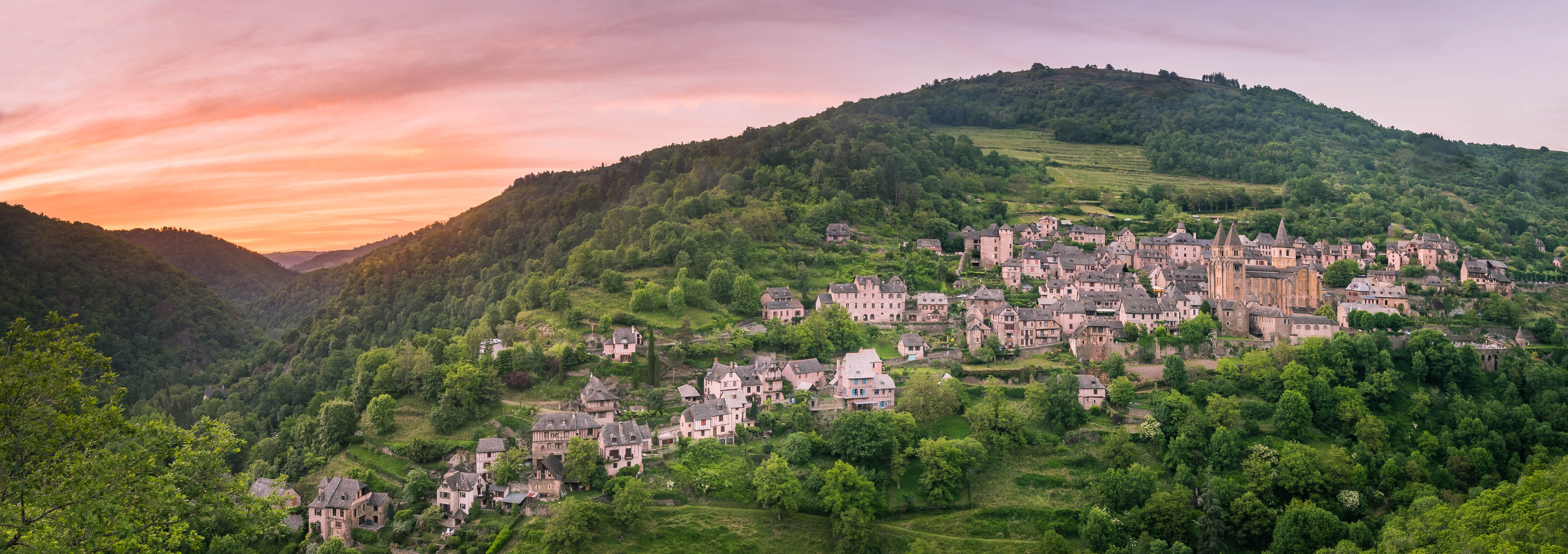
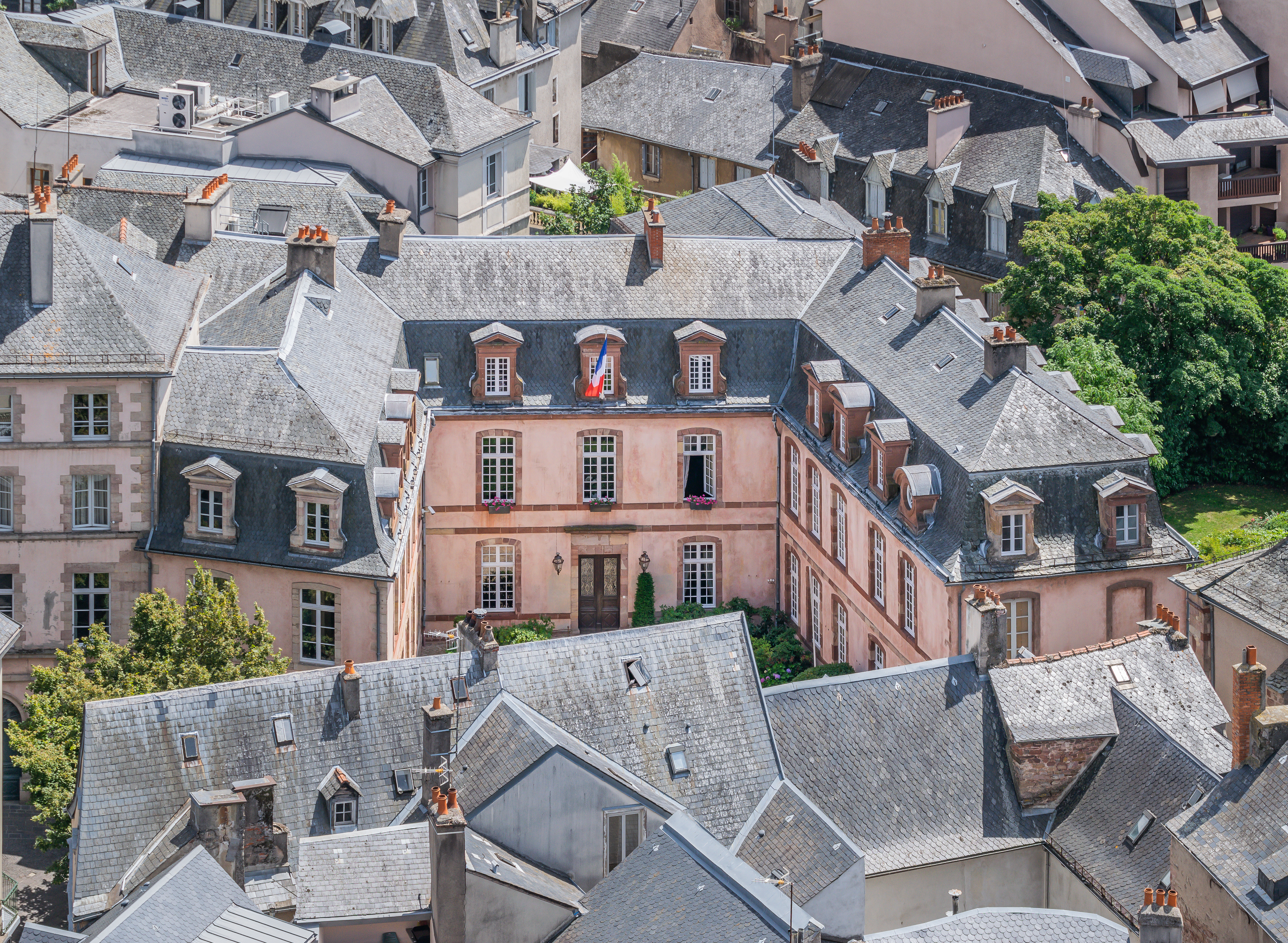
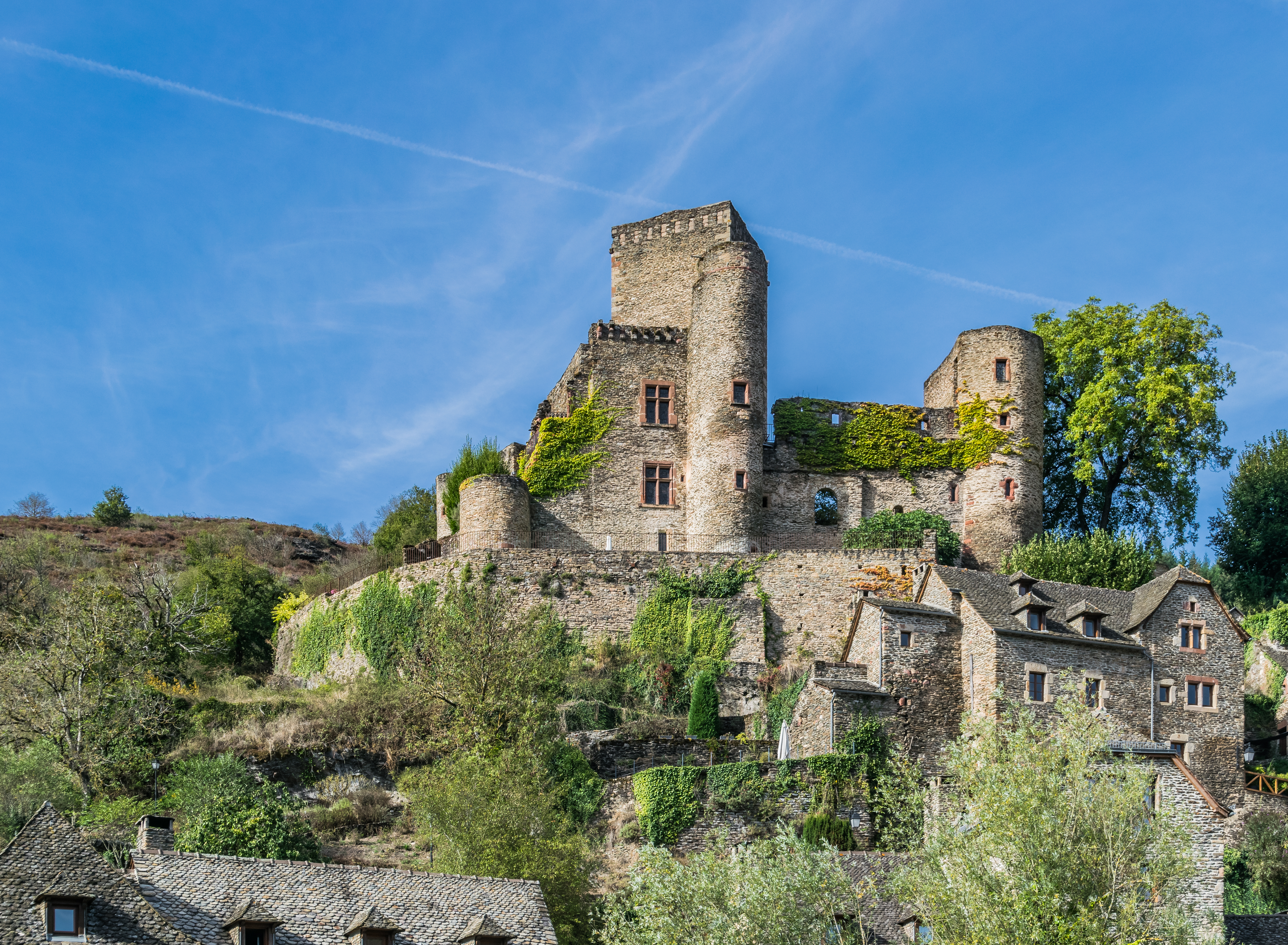
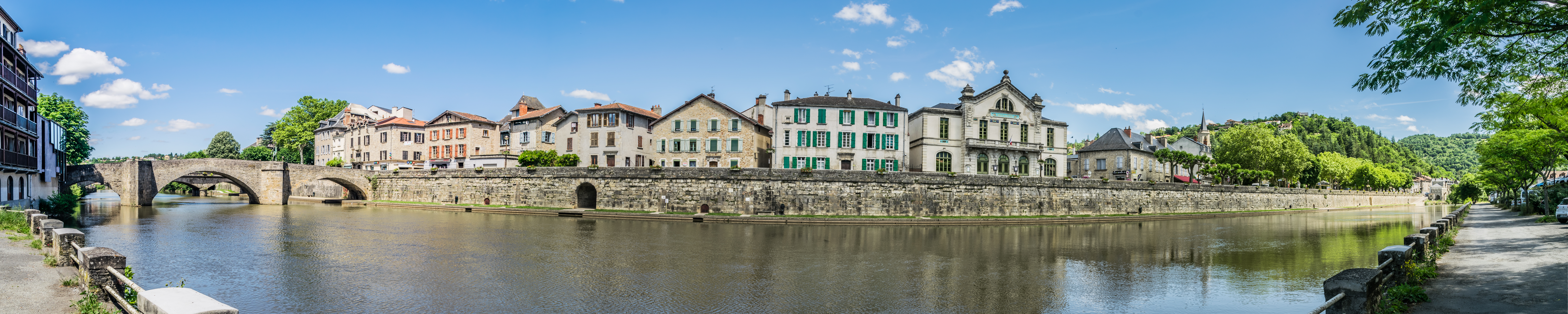
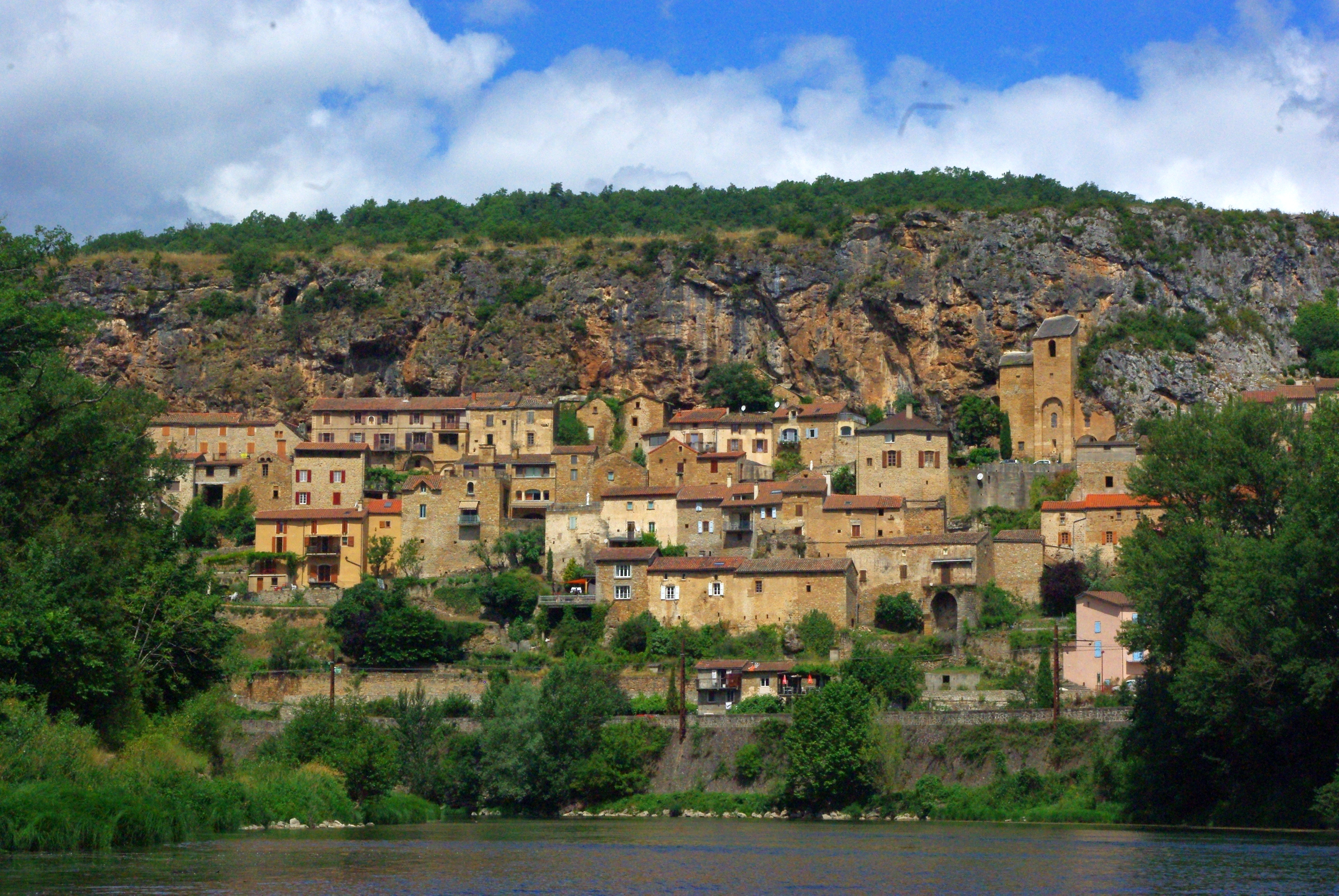
- From top down, left to right: Conques, prefecture building in Rodez, Castle of Belcastel, the river Aveyron in Villefranche-de-Rouergue and Peyre

- Flag Coat of arms

- Location of Aveyron in France
- Coordinates: 44°15′N 02°42′E
- Country: France
- Region: Occitania
- Prefecture: Rodez
- Subprefectures: Millau; Villefranche-de-Rouergue

Government
  - President of the Departmental Council: Arnaud Viala (HOR)

Area^{1}
  - Total: 8,735 km^{2} (3,373 sq mi)

Population (2023)
  - Total: 279,609
  - Rank: 79th
  - Density: 32.01/km^{2} (82.91/sq mi)
- Time zone: UTC+1 (CET)
  - Summer (DST): UTC+2 (CEST)
- Department number: 12
- Arrondissements: 3
- Cantons: 23
- Communes: 285
- ^1 French Land Register data, which exclude estuaries and lakes, ponds and glaciers larger than 1 km^{2}

Aveyron (French: [avɛʁɔ̃]; Occitan: Avairon [aβajˈɾu]) is a department in the region of Occitania, Southern France. It was named after the river Aveyron. Its inhabitants are known as Aveyronnais (masculine) or Aveyronnaises (feminine) in French. The inhabitants of Aveyron's prefecture, Rodez, are called Ruthénois, based upon the first settlers in the area, the Ruteni. With an area of 8,735 square kilometres (3,373 sq mi) and a population of 279,609 (2023), Aveyron is a largely rural department with a population density of 32 people/km^{2} (83 people/mi^{2}).

== History ==
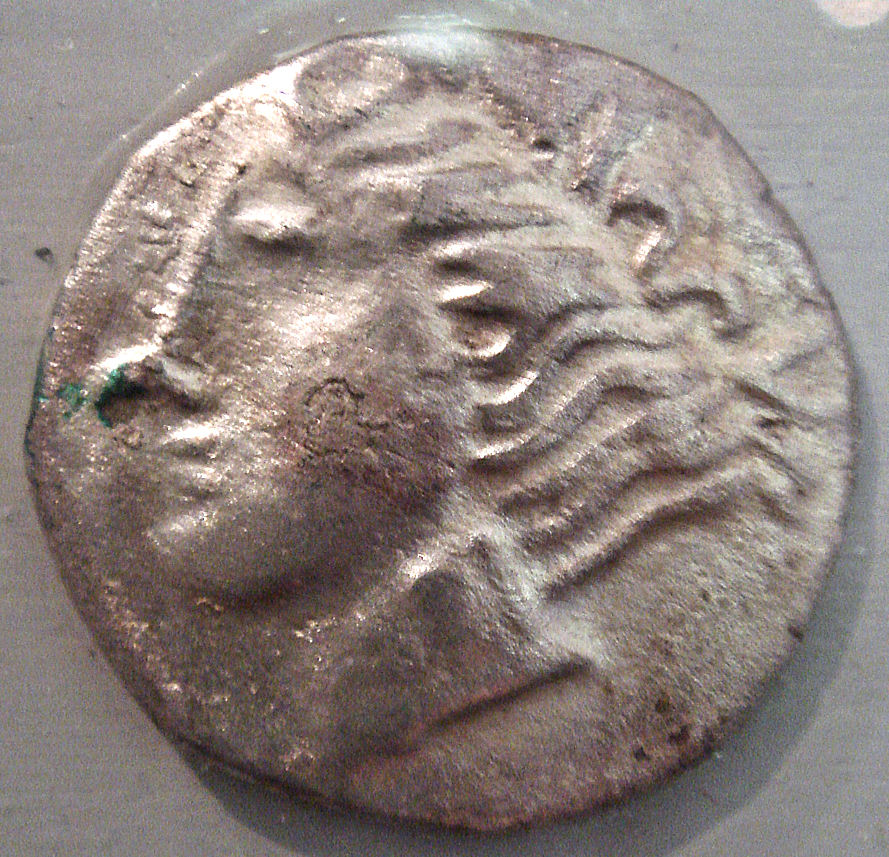
Ruteni coin, 5th–1st century BCE

Aveyron is one of the original 83 departments created during the French Revolution on 4 March 1790. The earliest known inhabitants of the region were the Rutenii tribe, though the area was inhabited prior to their tenure. The department has many prehistoric monuments, including over a thousand dolmens, the most of any department in France.

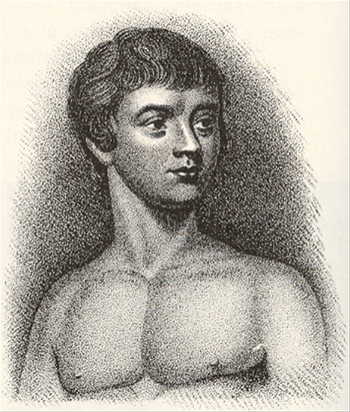
Victor of Aveyron in 1800

During the medieval and early modern periods, and until the 1790s, the territory included within Aveyron was a province known as Rouergue. In 1797, Victor of Aveyron (a feral child) was found wandering the woods in the area. The story of Victor is told in the film The Wild Child.

In 1817, a local prosecutor, Antoine Bernardin Fualdès, was assassinated. The sordid circumstances of his death, following which his body was found floating in the river Aveyron, led to the matter becoming publicised as a cause célèbre. Recent studies have indicated that he met his end at the initiative of a right-wing royalist organisation known as the Chevaliers de la Foi (Knights of Faith).

=== Heraldry ===
Arms of Aveyron	The Arms of Aveyron are those of the province of Rouergue and are blazoned as follows: Blazon: Gules, a lion rampant gardant in Or.

== Geography ==
Aveyron is the centre of a triangle formed by the cities of Toulouse, Clermont-Ferrand, and Montpellier. The department approximately follows the outline of the former province of Rouergue. It is the 5th largest department in metropolitan France in terms of area (8,735 km^{2} (3,373 sq mi)). Its prefecture is Rodez.

The department comes under the jurisdiction of the Academy of Toulouse and the Montpellier Court of Appeal. The INSEE and Post Code is 12. Aveyron is located in the south of the Massif Central. The highest point in the department is the summit of the Signal de Mailhebiau at 1469m on the Plateau of Aubrac. The Aveyron department is divided into several natural regions such as the Grand Causses and Rougiers.

Aveyron department consists of an ancient high rocky plateau of great geological diversity. The Truyère, Lot, Aveyron, and Tarn rivers have carved a number of deep gorges. The department is surrounded by those of Tarn, Tarn-et-Garonne, Lot, Hérault, Gard, Lozère and Cantal. The Lac de Villefranche-de-Panat is used as a reservoir to provide drinking water supplies for the region.

=== Climate ===
Comparison of local Meteorological data with other cities in France
Town	Sunshine (hours/yr)	Rain (mm/yr)	Snow (days/yr)	Storm (days/yr)	Fog (days/yr)
National average	1,973	770	14	22	40
Millau	2,146	732	25	25	59
Paris	1,661	637	12	18	10
Nice	2,724	767	1	29	1
Strasbourg	1,693	665	29	29	56
Brest	1,605	1,211	7	12	75

Climate data for Millau
Month	Jan	Feb	Mar	Apr	May	Jun	Jul	Aug	Sep	Oct	Nov	Dec	Year
Record high °C (°F)	17.6 (63.7)	21.8 (71.2)	23.9 (75.0)	27.0 (80.6)	29.2 (84.6)	35.1 (95.2)	37.5 (99.5)	38.0 (100.4)	34.1 (93.4)	28.9 (84.0)	23.9 (75.0)	19.1 (66.4)	38.0 (100.4)
Mean daily maximum °C (°F)	6.1 (43.0)	7.3 (45.1)	10.8 (51.4)	13.5 (56.3)	17.7 (63.9)	21.9 (71.4)	25.5 (77.9)	25.1 (77.2)	20.7 (69.3)	15.5 (59.9)	9.7 (49.5)	6.9 (44.4)	15.1 (59.2)
Daily mean °C (°F)	3.2 (37.8)	3.9 (39.0)	6.7 (44.1)	9.1 (48.4)	13.2 (55.8)	16.9 (62.4)	19.9 (67.8)	19.6 (67.3)	15.9 (60.6)	11.9 (53.4)	6.7 (44.1)	4.0 (39.2)	10.9 (51.6)
Mean daily minimum °C (°F)	0.2 (32.4)	0.4 (32.7)	2.6 (36.7)	4.7 (40.5)	8.6 (47.5)	11.9 (53.4)	14.3 (57.7)	14.1 (57.4)	11.1 (52.0)	8.3 (46.9)	3.6 (38.5)	1.1 (34.0)	6.7 (44.1)
Record low °C (°F)	−17.5 (0.5)	−19.4 (−2.9)	−12.9 (8.8)	−5.5 (22.1)	−2.0 (28.4)	3.0 (37.4)	6.0 (42.8)	4.9 (40.8)	1.6 (34.9)	−4.1 (24.6)	−10.3 (13.5)	−13.0 (8.6)	−19.4 (−2.9)
Average precipitation mm (inches)	55.4 (2.18)	47.4 (1.87)	42.5 (1.67)	69.9 (2.75)	73.4 (2.89)	60.5 (2.38)	39.7 (1.56)	54.8 (2.16)	77.7 (3.06)	79.6 (3.13)	69.1 (2.72)	61.6 (2.43)	731.6 (28.80)
Average precipitation days (≥ 1 mm)	8.7	7.7	7.9	9.4	8.8	6.7	4.2	5.5	6.8	8.8	9.3	8.8	92.6
Mean monthly sunshine hours	100	115	173	183	218	262	296	261	208	132	100	98	2,146
Source 1: Meteorological data for Millau – 715m altitude, from 1981 to 2010 January 2015
Source 2: Record temperatures for Millau since 1951 January 2015

== Demography ==
After a long decline, the population has been increasing again since 1999.

Historical population

Year	Pop.	±% p.a.
1791	371,835	—
1801	318,340	−1.54%
1806	331,921	+0.84%
1821	339,422	+0.15%
1831	359,056	+0.56%
1836	370,951	+0.65%
1841	375,083	+0.22%
1846	389,121	+0.74%
1851	394,183	+0.26%
1856	393,890	−0.01%
1861	396,025	+0.11%
1866	400,070	+0.20%
1872	402,474	+0.10%
1876	413,826	+0.70%
1881	415,075	+0.06%
1886	415,826	+0.04%
1891	400,467	−0.75%
1896	389,464	−0.56%
1901	382,074	−0.38%

Year	Pop.	±% p.a.
1906	377,299	−0.25%
1911	369,448	−0.42%
1921	332,940	−1.04%
1926	328,886	−0.24%
1931	323,782	−0.31%
1936	314,682	−0.57%
1946	307,717	−0.22%
1954	292,727	−0.62%
1962	290,489	−0.10%
1968	281,568	−0.52%
1975	278,306	−0.17%
1982	278,654	+0.02%
1990	270,141	−0.39%
1999	263,808	−0.26%
2007	274,425	+0.49%
2012	276,229	+0.13%
2017	279,206	+0.21%
2023	279,609	+0.02%

Source: SPLAF and INSEE

=== Principal towns ===
The most populous commune is Rodez, the prefecture. Of the department's population, 25% live in the four largest communes: Rodez, Millau, Onet-le-Château, and Villefranche-de-Rouergue. As of 2023, there are 7 communes with more than 5,000 inhabitants:

Commune	Population (2023)
Rodez	23,981
Millau	22,044
Onet-le-Château	12,080
Villefranche-de-Rouergue	11,271
Saint-Affrique	7,941
Luc-la-Primaube	6,046
Decazeville	5,020

=== Second homes ===
As of 2020, 17.3% of available housing in the department were second homes.

Communes with population over 2,000 and more than 10% of second homes in 2019
Town	Municipal population	Percentage of second homes
Saint-Geniez-d'Olt-et-d'Aubrac	2,211	30.3%
Espalion	4,601	19.9%
Salles-la-Source	2,265	18.5%
Sévérac-d'Aveyron	4,069	18.4%
Saint-Affrique	8,023	15.4%
Bozouls	2,923	10.1%
Naucelle	2,007	10.0%

== Politics ==
=== Departmental council ===
The Departmental Council of Aveyron has 46 seats (two per canton). The President of the Departmental Council has been Arnaud Viala since 2021. Formerly a member of The Republicans (LR), Viala joined Horizons (HOR) in 2024.

Party		Seats
•	The Republicans; Union of Democrats and Independents	30
	Socialist Party	10
	Radical Party of the Left	5
	Independent	1

=== Representation in Paris ===
==== National Assembly ====
Constituency	Member	Party
Aveyron's 1st	Pauline Cestrières	RE
Aveyron's 2nd	Laurent Alexandre	LFI
Aveyron's 3rd	Jean-François Rousset	RE

==== Senate ====
Senator	Party	Since
Alain Marc	PR	2014
Jean-Claude Anglars	LR	2020

== Culture ==
=== Regional sub-dialect ===
The regional sub-dialect spoken in Aveyron is a form of Languedoc Occitan called Rouergat. Faced with the risk of disappearance of the language several associations asked the State and political communities for an ambitious language policy. In Rouergat, Aveyron is written:

- Avairon (traditional Occitan spelling) – e.g. "Roergue forma lo despartament de l'Avairon"
- Oboyróu (spelling of Father Vayssier) – e.g. "Rouergue fouórmo lou desportomén de l'Oboyróu"

== Tourism ==
Aveyron contains part of the Cévennes National Park. Tourist attractions include the castle of Najac, a medieval ruin perched high on a hill, and other castles and monasteries such as Conques Abbey, Sylvanès Abbey, Bonneval Abbey and Loc-Dieu Abbey, located near Martiel in a region with many dolmens. The small city of Millau is the site of the world's tallest bridge, the Millau viaduct, opened by President Chirac in December 2004.

Activities include horseriding, fishing, swimming in the Lacs du Lévézou and hiking/camping. The inhabitants are also very good craftsmen, and Aveyron is full of various craft objects, handmade, that can be found locally. Examples include the couteau de Laguiole, the world famous Roquefort cheese, from the village of the same name and other local produce. Markets take place every Saturday on market places around the region.

Saint-Sernin-sur-Rance is the commune where the feral child Victor of Aveyron was found in the late 18th century.

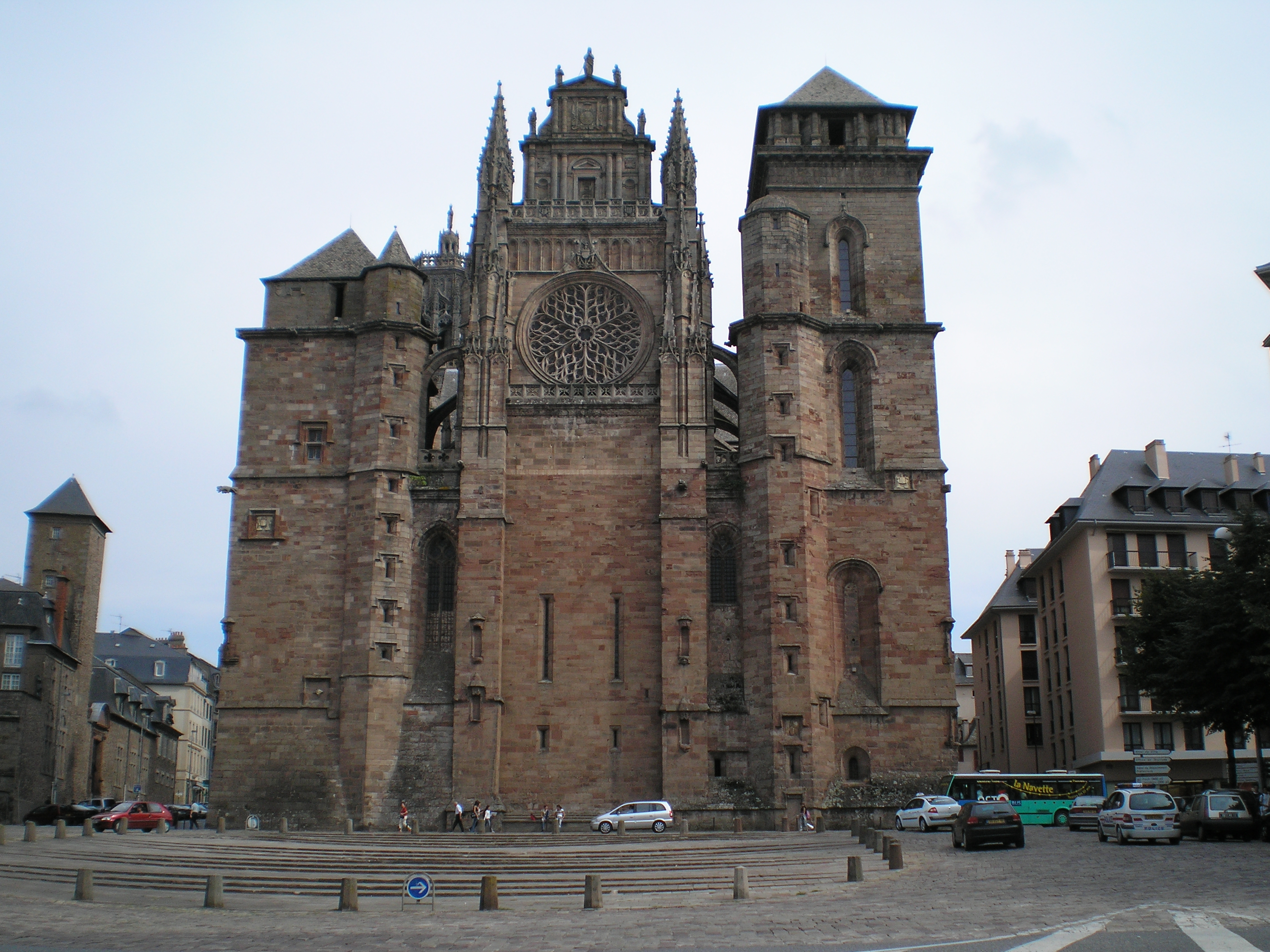
Rodez Cathedral

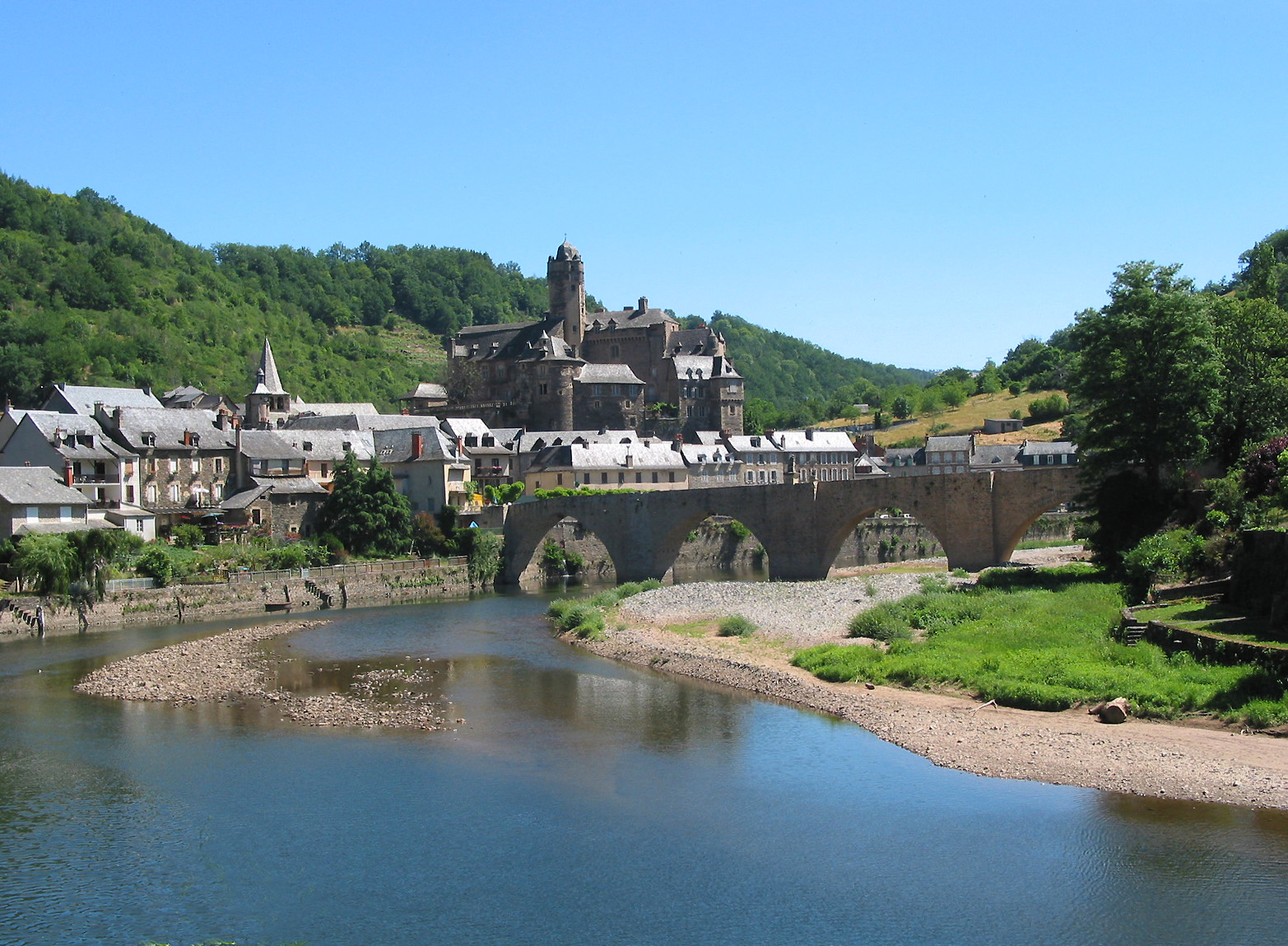
Estaing

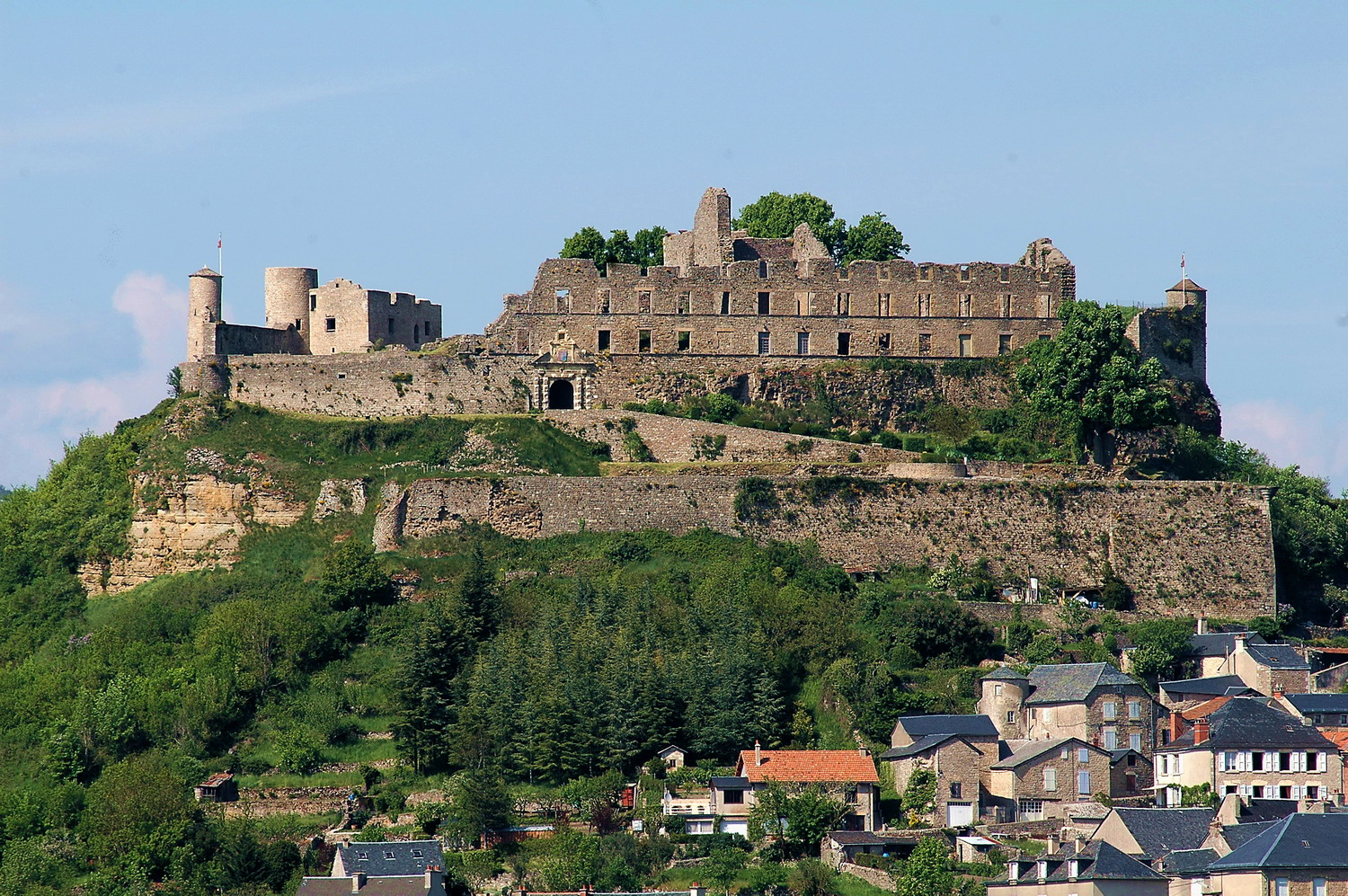
Sévérac-le-Château

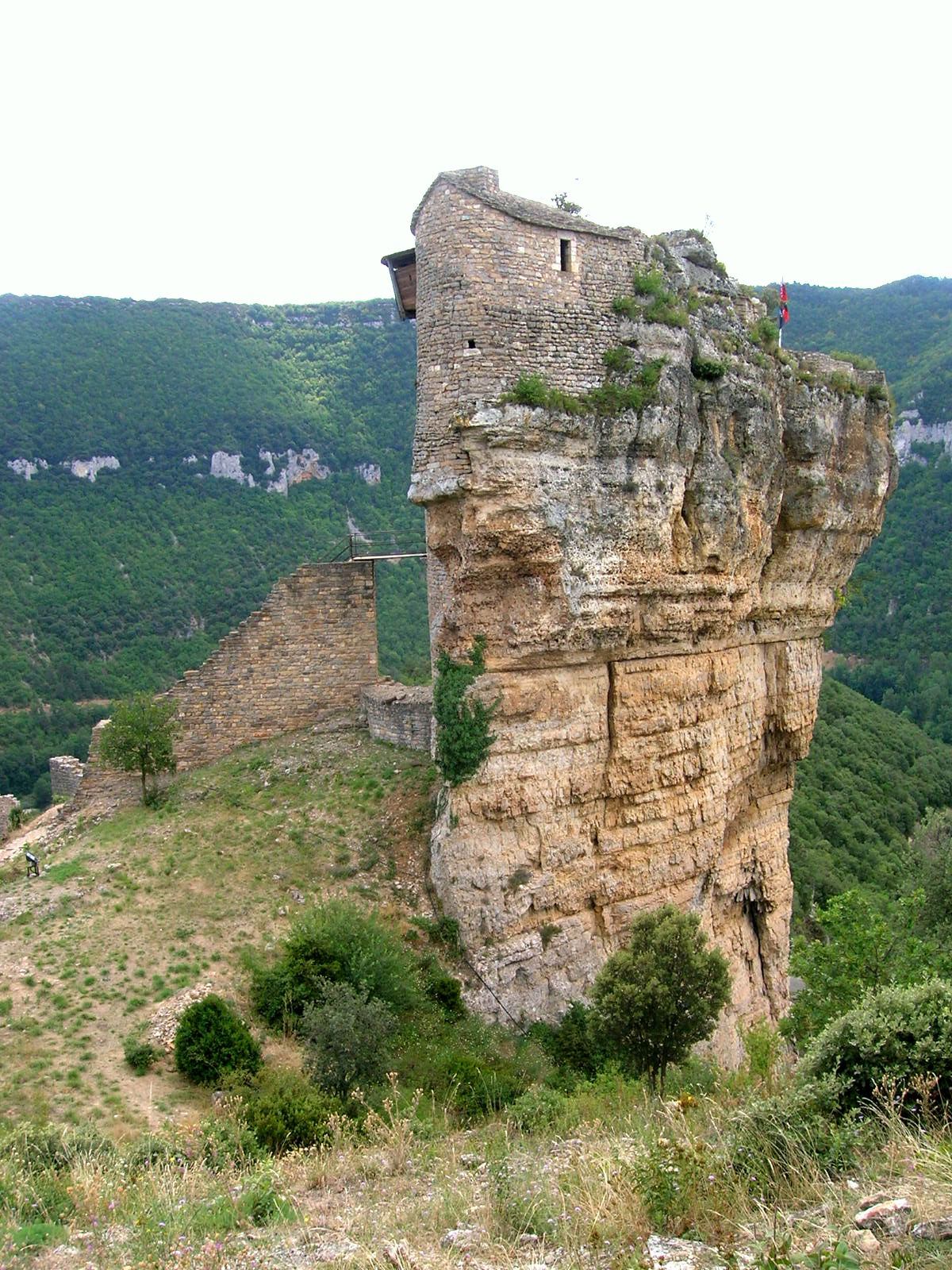
Château de Peyrelade

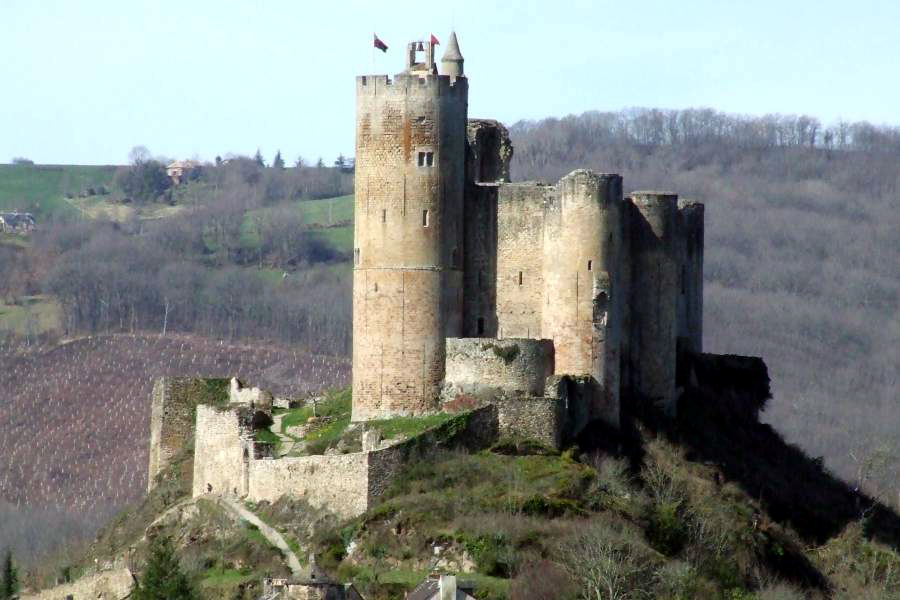
Château de Najac

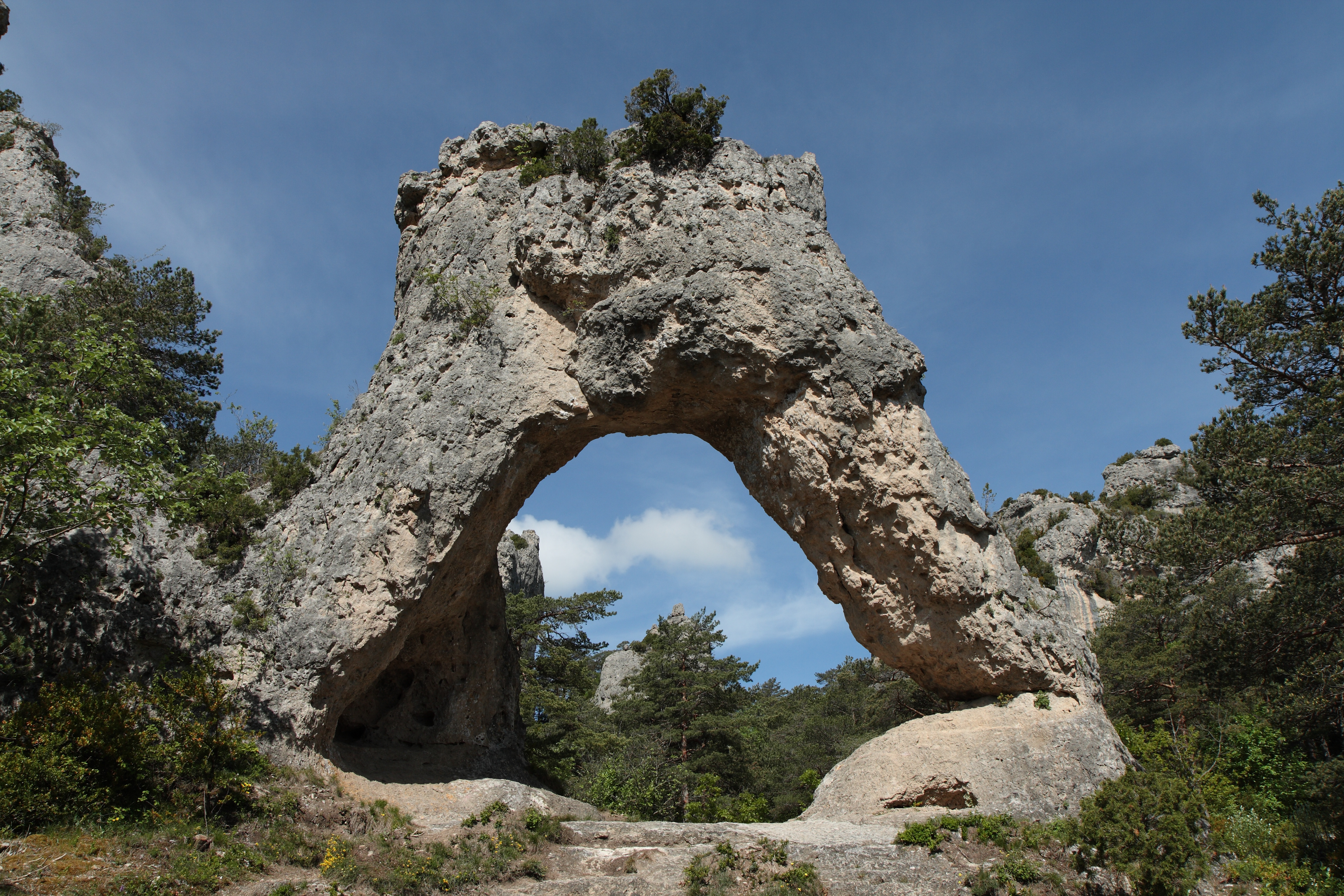
Chaos de Montpellier-le-Vieux

=== Les Plus Beaux Villages de France ===
Ten towns in Aveyron fall within the classification of a 1901 association Les Plus Beaux Villages de France:

- Belcastel
- Brousse-le-Château
- La Couvertoirade
- Conques
- Estaing
- Najac
- Peyre
- Saint-Côme-d'Olt
- Sainte-Eulalie-d'Olt
- Sauveterre-de-Rouergue.

=== Other tourist spots ===
- Roquecézière
- Saint-Geniez-d'Olt
- Loc-Dieu Abbey
- Bonneval Abbey
- Coupiac
- Aubrac Mountains
- Causse du Larzac
- Château de Sévérac
- Bournazel
- Baraqueville
- Château de Calmont d'Olt
- Rodez
- Millau
- Pons
- Medieval villages in the Muse Valley:
  - Castelnau-Pégayrols
  - Saint-Beauzély
  - Montjaux
- Villefranche-de-Rouergue
- Villeneuve
- The Trou de Bozouls
- The Tindoul de la Vayssière
- Vale of Marcillac, Vineyards and towns:
  - Marcillac-Vallon
  - Salles-la-Source
  - Clairvaux-d'Aveyron
  - Muret-le-Château
- The Lakes of Lévézou
- Laguiole
- The Gorges du Tarn
- Sainte-Eulalie-de-Cernon
- Salles-Curan and the Lac de Pareloup
- Salvagnac-Cajarc
- Roquefort-sur-Soulzon
- Saint-Sernin-sur-Rance, classed as a historic area with the "Feral child": Victor of Aveyron
- Peyrusse-le-Roc
- Grotto of Foissac
- The Basin of Decazeville (Decazeville, Aubin, Cransac, Firmi and Viviez) with old coal mines.

== Societies ==
- Central Agricultural Society of Aveyron, founded in 1798
- Society of letters, sciences and arts of Aveyron, founded in 1836

== Notable people linked to the department ==
- Denis Auguste Affre, Archbishop of Paris (1793–1848)
- Georges d'Armagnac, Bishop of Avignon, cardinal and Bishop of Rodez (died in 1585)
- Louis Gabriel Ambroise de Bonald, philosopher (1754–1840)
- Louis-Jacques Maurice de Bonald, bishop (1787–1870)
- Émile Borel, mathematician (1871–1956)
- Jean Boudou, Occitan writer born in Crespin (home of Joan Bodon)
- José Bové, anti-globalisationist, former MEP, presidential candidate, farmer, activist and former spokesman of French farmers' union Confédération paysanne, peasant in the cause of Larzac (1953–)
- Michel Bras (1946–), chef
- Jean Carrier, clergyman of the 15th century, the last supporter and successor of the Antipope Benedict XIII under the name of Benedict XIV
- Edouard de Castelnau, general (1851–1944)
- Bertrand Delanoe, French politician and mayor of Paris (1950–)
- Auguste Denayrouze, scientist, inventor, writer (1837–1883)
- Jean-Henri Fabre, French entomologist and writer (1823–1915)
- Robert Fabre, founder of the Movement of Radicals of the left, ombudsman (1915–2006)
- Maurice Fenaille, patron (1855–1937)
- Denis-Luc Frayssinous, bishop and tutor of the Dauphin
- Gustave Garrigou, winner of the Tour de France in 1911, born in Vabre-Tizac
- Alexandre Geniez, racing cyclist
- Guy Lacombe, football coach (1955–)
- Bernard Laporte, rugby coach (1964–)
- Cyril Lignac, French chef and TV host
- Cardinal Marty, Archbishop of Paris (1904–1994)
- Jules Merviel, cyclist active in the 1930s, born in Saint-Beauzély (1906–1976)
- Amans-Alexis Monteil, historian (1769–1850)
- Alain Peyrefitte, writer, minister, member of the Académie française (1925–1999)
- Pierre Poujade, politician, was born and lived in Labastide l'Evêque
- Francis Poulenc, composer (1899–1963)
- Denys Puech, sculptor, director of the Villa Medicis (1854–1942)
- Jean Puech, former president of the general council of Aveyron, senator, and former minister (1942–)
- Guillaume-Thomas Raynal, historian, philosopher (1713–1796)
- Emilie de Rodat, founder of the congregation of the Sisters of the Holy Family of Villefranche (1787–1852)
- Gaëtan Roussel, songwriter (1972–)
- Richard Sainct, motorcycle rider (1970–2004)
- Pierre Frédéric Sarrus, mathematician (1798–1861)
- Pierre Soulages, painter (1919–2022)
- Jean Verdier, Cardinal Archbishop of Paris (1864–1940)
- Eugène Viala, painter, poet (1859–1913)

== Bibliography ==
- Encyclopedia Bonneton, Aveyron, Christine Bonneton, 2005 (in French)
- Jean-Michel Cosson, Dictionary of Aveyron, Loubatières, ISBN 2-86266-471-5 (in French)
- Daniel Crozes, The Guide to Aveyron, Éditions du Rouergue, ISBN 2-84156-541-6 (in French)
- Aue/Miche, Aveyron (Discovered), MSM, ISBN 2-911515-44-7 (in French)
- Dominique Auzias, Jean-Paul Labourdette, The small clever Aveyron, Collectif, Nouvelles Éditions Université, ISBN 2-7469-1664-9 (in French)
- Paul Astruc, Major Criminal cases of Aveyron, Éditions De Borée, ISBN 2-84494-180-X (in French)
- Christian Bernard, Aveyron in flowers: Illustrated inventory of vascular plants of Aveyron department, Éditions du Rouergue, ISBN 2-84156-658-7 (in French)
- Francine Claustres, Aveyron Cuisine, Sud Ouest, ISBN 2-87901-257-0 (in French)
- Aveyron: Farming Yields, Du Curieux, ISBN 2-914225-07-5 (in French)
- French Hiking Federation, Aveyron on foot, Guide FFRP, ISBN 2-85699-893-3 (in French)
- French Hiking Federation, The most beautiful villages in Aveyron… on foot: 20 walks and hikes, FFRP, ISBN 2-7514-0113-9 (in French)
- Hubert Calmette, The paths of Émilie in Aveyron, French Hiking Federation, ISBN 2-84182-156-0 (in French)
- Richard André, Romain Pages Éditions, Le Parc naturel régional des Grands Causses, ISBN 2-84350-194-6 (in French)
- Rémi Soulié, The old Rouergue: Land of Aveyron, Paris, ISBN 2-84621-069-1 (in French)
- Alain Marc, Aveyron, Logbooks, Éditions du Rouergue, ISBN 2-84156-610-2 (in French)
- Laurent Millet, Family names of Aveyron, Archives Cult, ISBN 2-35077-013-3 (in French)
- Laurent Barthe, Of Rouergue in Aveyron, Empreinte, ISBN 2-913319-34-3 (in French)
- Aveyron 1900–1920 Édition De Boree, ISBN 2-84494-322-5 (in French)
- Jean-Michel Cosson, Stéphane Monnet, Aveyron in the 1939–1945 war, Éditions De Boré, ISBN 2-84494-464-7 (in French)
- Jill Dawson, Béatrice Dunner, The wild child of Aveyron, Du Rocher, ISBN 2-268-05377-6 (in French)
- Jean Itard, Victor de l'Aveyron, Allia, ISBN 2-904235-78-7 (in French)
- Dagonet/Christian, Regards to Aveyron, De Borée, ISBN 2-84494-536-8 (in French)
- Nicole de Bertier, Meeting in Aveyron, Equinoxe, ISBN 2-84135-471-7 (in French)

== See also ==
- Arrondissements of the Aveyron department
- County of Rodez
- Cantons of the Aveyron department
- Communes of the Aveyron department
- Maison de Jeanne
