= Academy of Toulouse =

Coordinates: 43.5781°N 1.4462°E

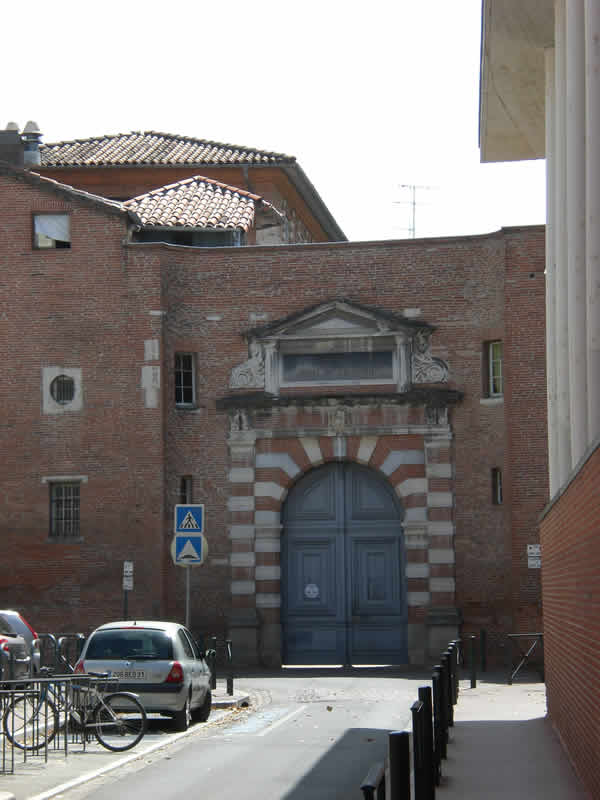
The academy's "Monumental entrance"

The Academy of Toulouse is a school district in the Occitanie region of southern France.

It is administered by a rector. The rectory is located in the city of Toulouse.

== Departments ==
It combines the educational departments of:

- Ariège (09),
- Aveyron (12),
- Haute-Garonne (31),
- Gers (32),
- Lot (46),
- Hautes-Pyrénées (65),
- Tarn (81)
- Tarn-et-Garonne (82).
