= Canton of Rodez-1 =

Coordinates: 44.358°N 2.569°E

- Canton
- Situation of the canton of Rodez-1 in the department of Aveyron
- Country: France
- Region: Occitania
- Department: Aveyron
- No. of communes: part of Rodez
- Population (2023): 12,261
- INSEE code: 1216

The Canton of Rodez-1 is an administrative division of Aveyron, a department in southern France. It was created at the French canton reorganisation which came into effect in March 2015. Its seat is in Rodez.

It consists of part of the commune of Rodez.
