= Loc-Dieu Abbey =

Former abbey in Aveyron, France

Coordinates: 44°20′22″N 1°55′51″E

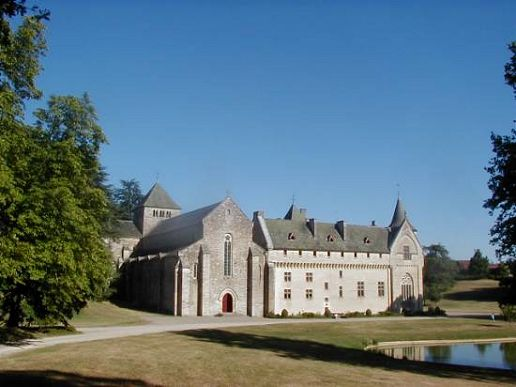
Loc-Dieu Abbey, view of the west wing, in front of the fishpond

Loc-Dieu Abbey is a Cistercian abbey located near Martiel, 9 km west from Villefranche-de-Rouergue, in the department of Aveyron in France.

== History ==
Founded in 1123 in a place formerly called Locus Diaboli (Latin for "devil's place") due to the large number of dolmens around it, it was renamed Locus Dei in Latin by the monks, which in French became Loc-Dieu, both meaning the "place of God".

Burnt down by the English in 1409, it was rebuilt in 1470, and the abbey was fortified.

The abbey was suppressed and its assets sold off as national property by the French government during the French Revolution in 1793. The Cibiel family bought it in 1812, and Cibiel descendants still live in it today.

The buildings were restored in 1840 (the east wing) and in 1880 (the south and west wings).

In the summer of 1940, paintings from the Louvre, including the Mona Lisa, were hidden in Loc-Dieu to keep them safe from German troops.

The abbey and its large park are now open to visitors.

== Architecture ==
- Church: built between 1159 and 1189, the church remains intact. This is one of the first Gothic buildings in southern France, designed by architects from Burgundy. Cistercian rules are followed, i.e. the greatest simplicity possible, with no decorations other than the stone and light.
- Cloister and Chapter room: rebuilt in 1470, they replaced the previous Romanesque cloister. They present a strong Gothic style.

== Gallery ==
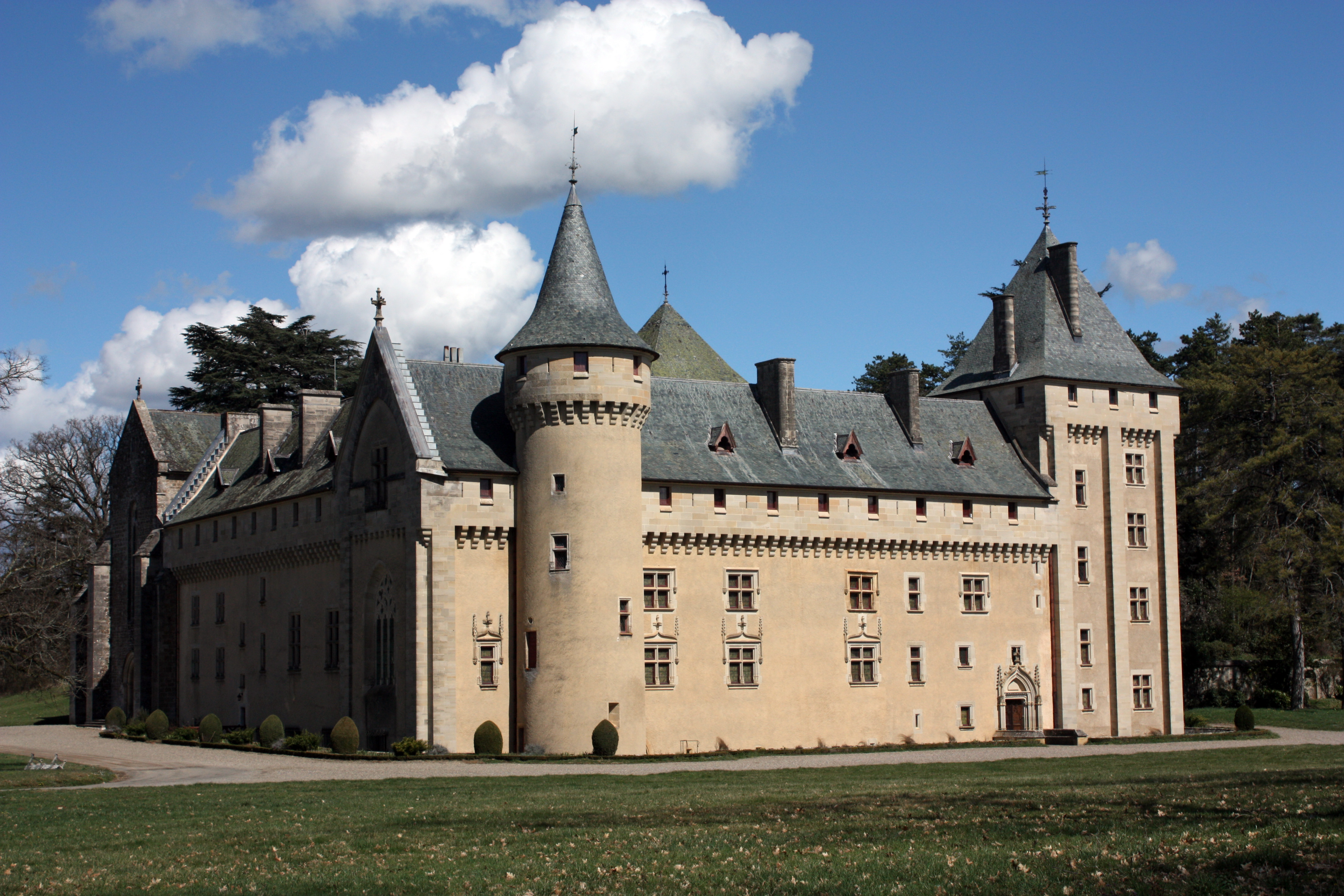

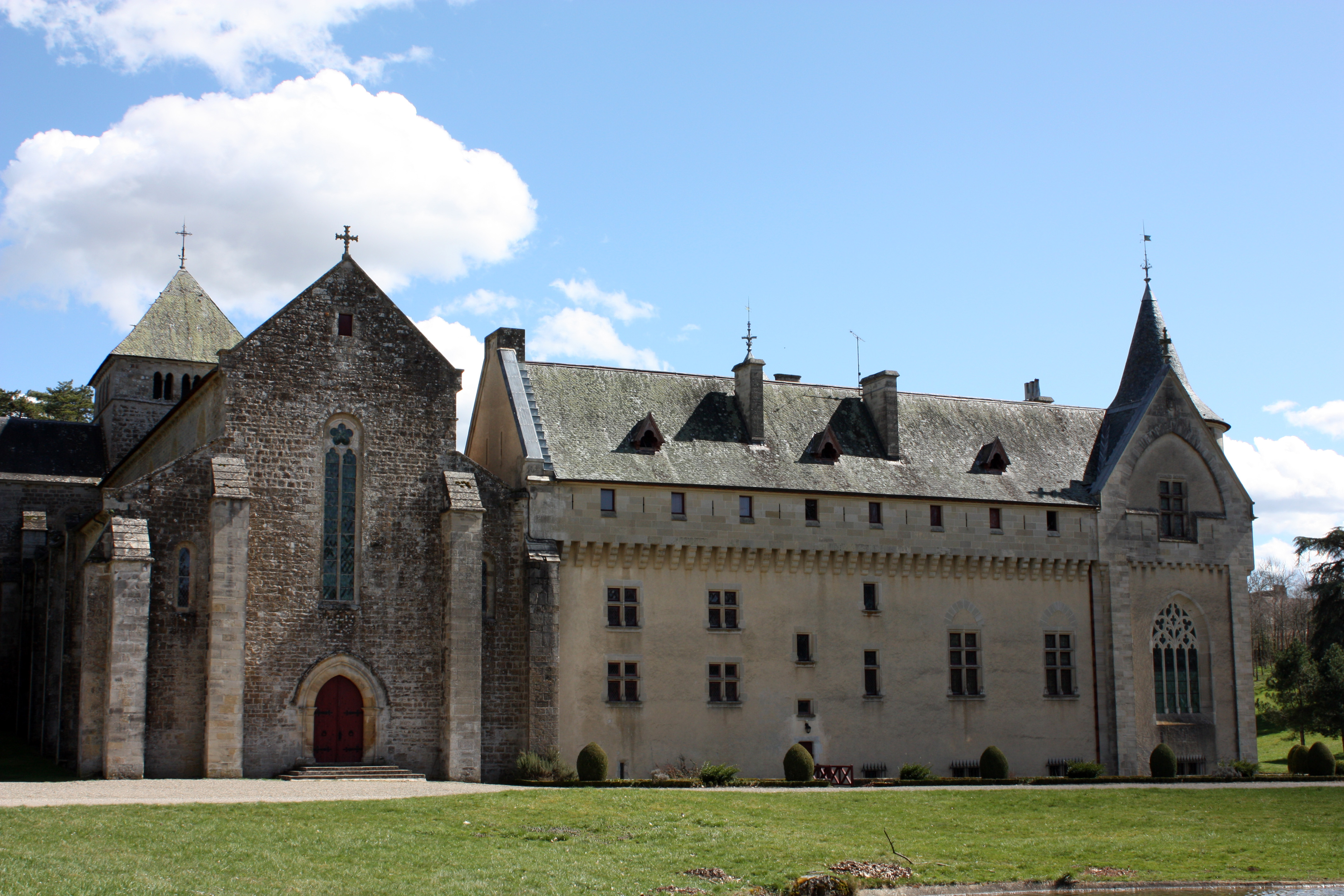

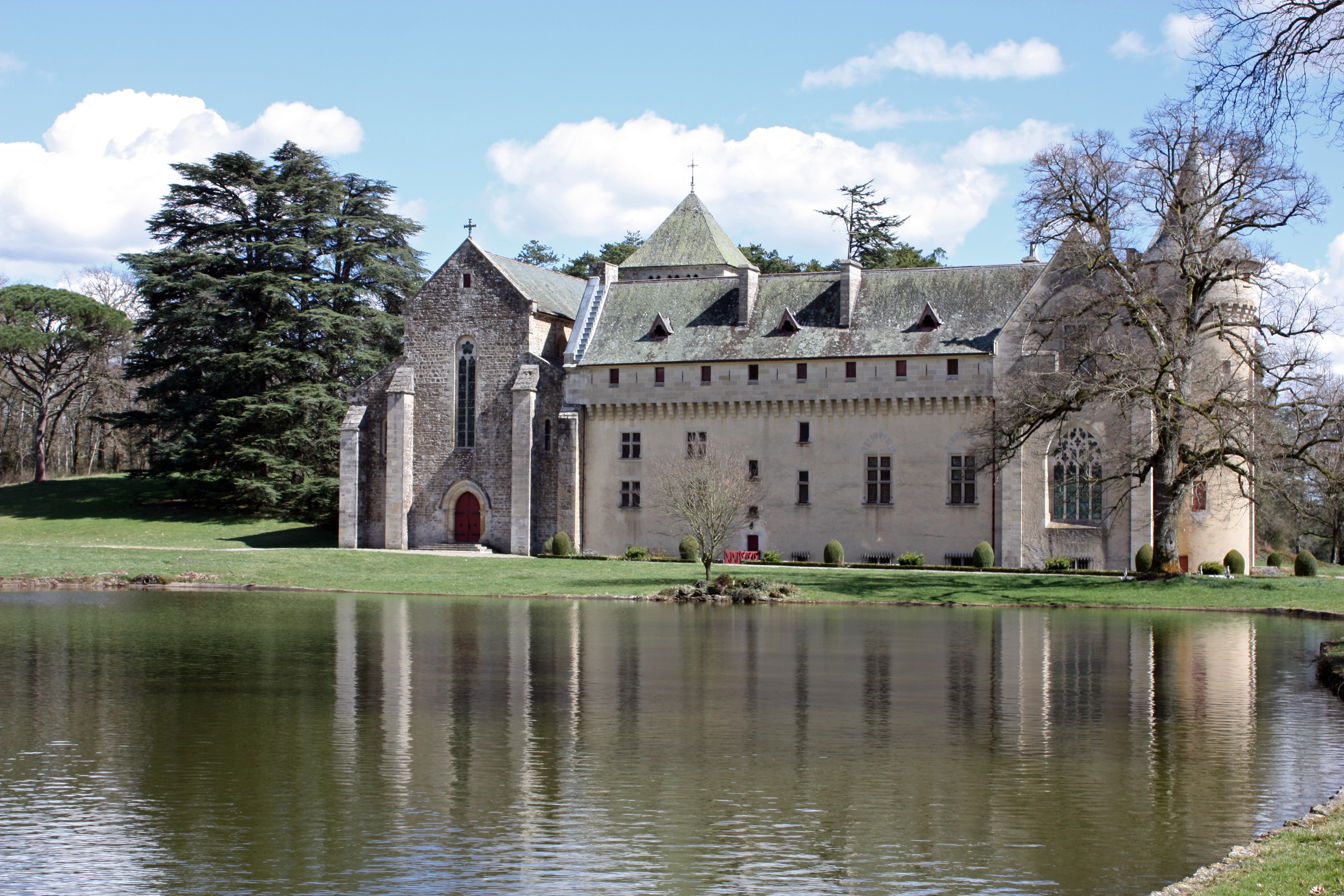
