= Abbey =

Monastery under an abbot or an abbess

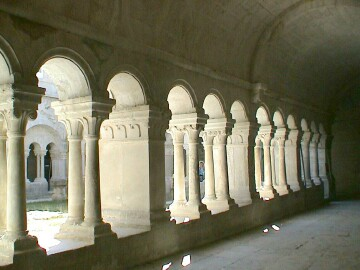
The cloister of Sénanque Abbey, Provence

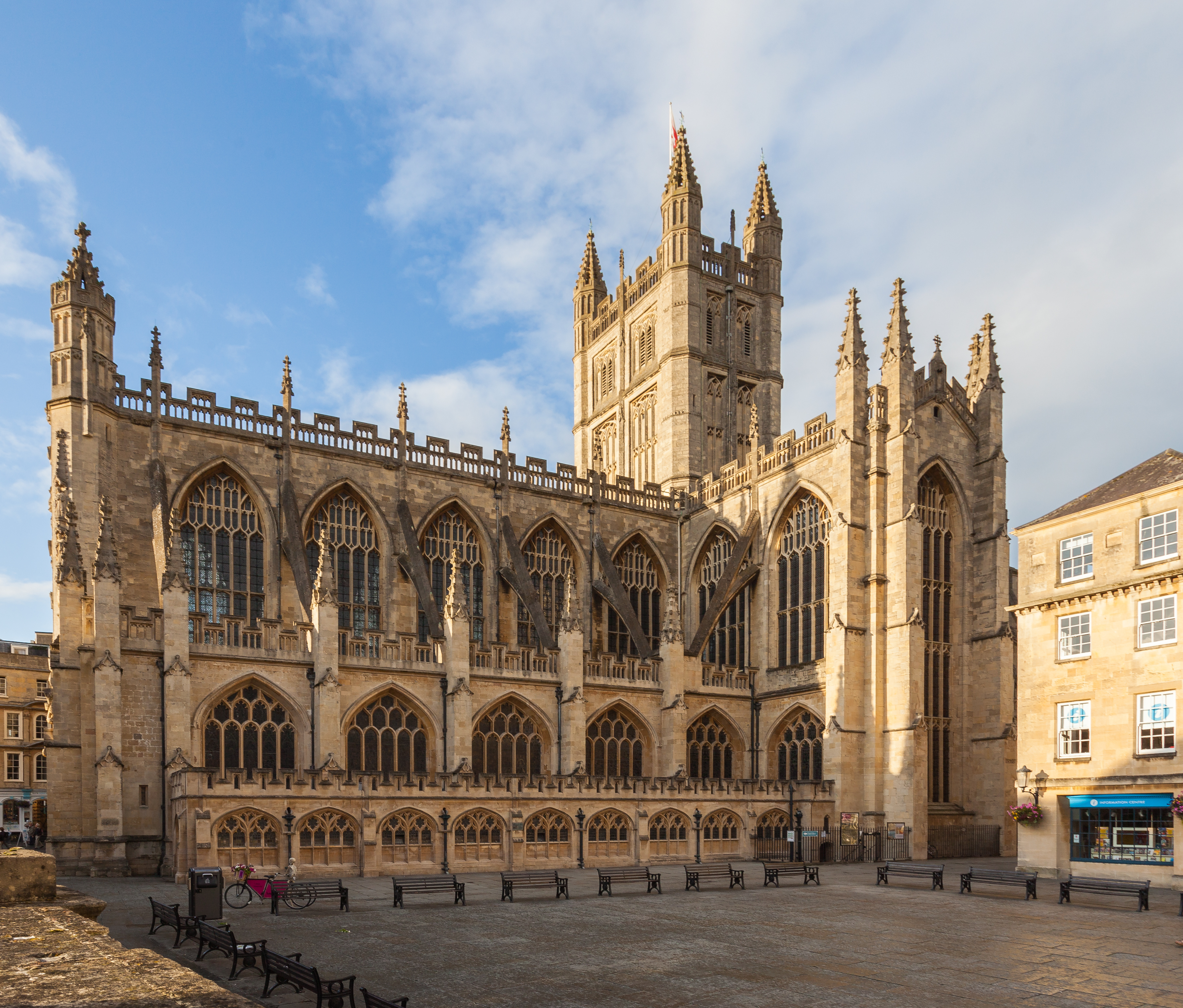
Church of the former Bath Abbey, Somerset

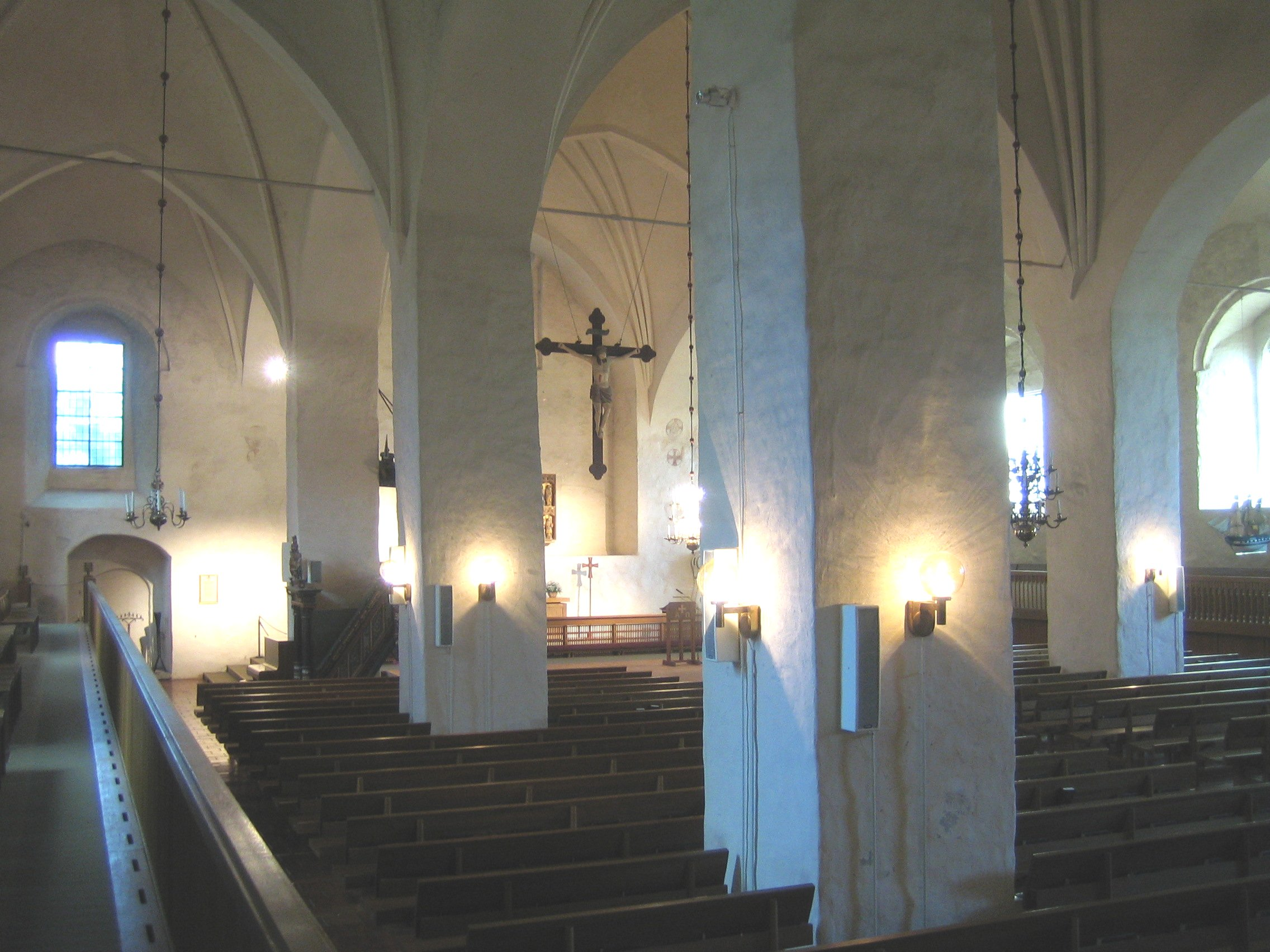
An interior of the Bridgettine's Nådendal Abbey, a medieval Catholic monastery in Naantali, Finland

An abbey is a type of monastery used by members of a religious order under the governance of an abbot or abbess. Abbeys provide a complex of buildings and land for religious activities, work, and housing of Christian or Buddhist monks and nuns.

The concept of the abbey has developed over many centuries from the early monastic ways of religious men and women where they would live isolated from the lay community about them. Religious life in an abbey may be monastic. An abbey may be the home of an enclosed religious order or may be open to visitors. The layout of the church and associated buildings of an abbey often follows a set plan determined by the founding religious order.

Abbeys are often self-sufficient while using any abundance of produce or skill to provide care to the poor and needy, refuge to the persecuted, or education to the young. Some abbeys offer accommodation to people who are seeking spiritual retreat. There are many famous abbeys across the Mediterranean Basin and Europe.

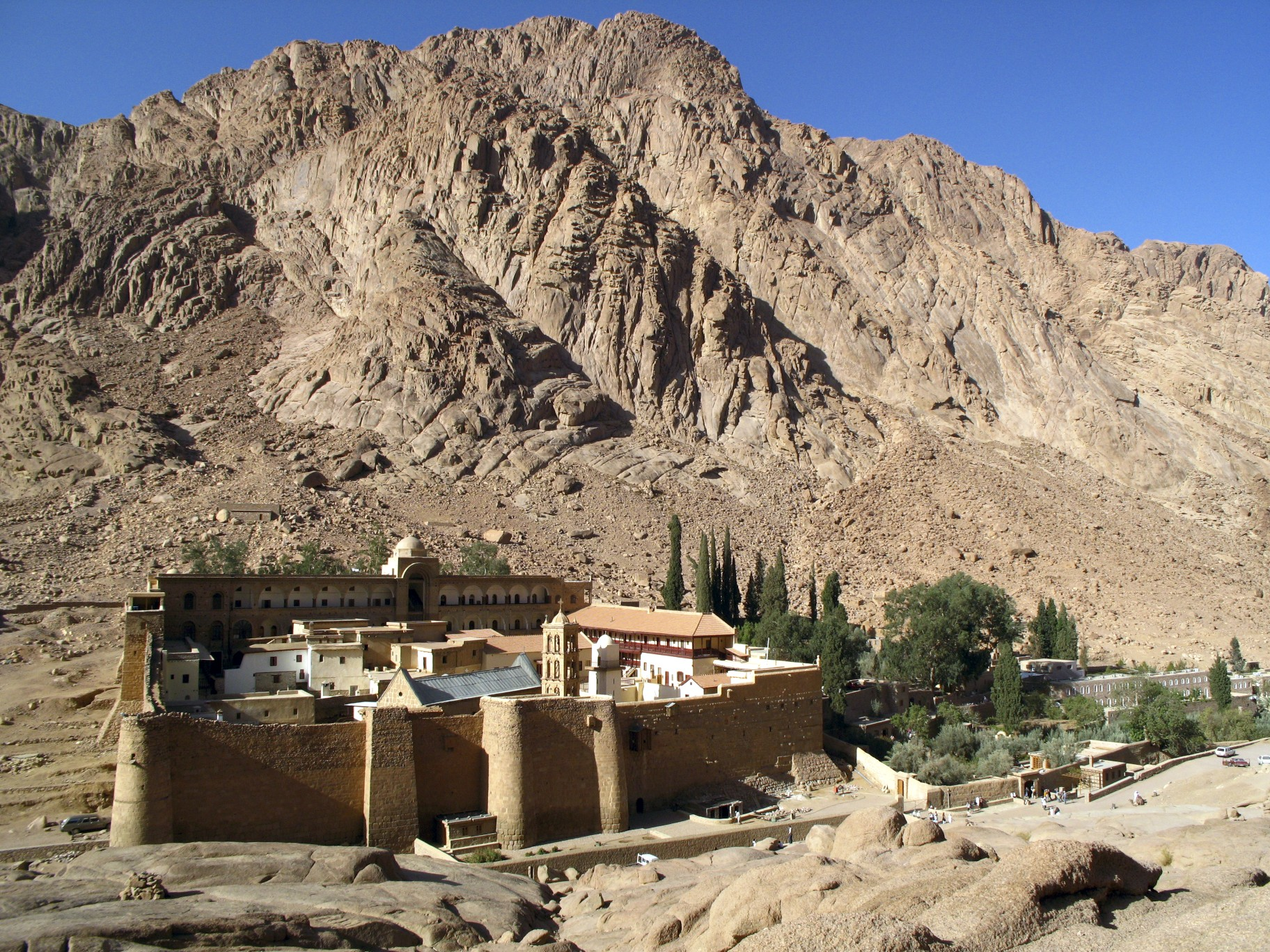
Abbey of St Catherine, Mount Sinai

== Monastic origins of the abbey ==
The origins of abbeys are closely tied to the development of Christian monasticism, which began with individuals seeking spiritual fulfillment through asceticism and withdrawal from society. Similar monastic and ascetic traditions also exist in other religious traditions, including Hinduism, which has long supported organized forms of renunciation and monastic life.

=== Ascetics and anchorites ===
Early Christian monastic life often centered around hermits or ascetics who lived in solitude to dedicate themselves to prayer, fasting, and contemplation. These individuals typically resided in simple huts or caves, sometimes near a village or in remote areas. Over time, followers gathered around these ascetics, drawn by their perceived holiness and spiritual insight, eventually forming small religious communities.

Comparable developments occurred in ancient India, where Hinduism has long supported traditions of renunciation. Hindu ascetics, known as sannyasis, often withdrew from worldly life to live in forest hermitages or remote monasteries known as Mathas. These institutions served not only as places of solitude and meditation but also as centers of religious learning and community life.

In the Christian tradition, one of the earliest and most influential monastic figures was Anthony the Great, who around 312 AD retreated to the Thebaid desert in Egypt to escape persecution under Emperor Maximian. Anthony became renowned for his austere lifestyle and spiritual authority. His growing number of disciples eventually settled near him, building their own dwellings and forming one of the first organized monastic communities.

According to the church historian August Neander, Anthony inadvertently laid the foundation for coenobitic monasticism—a communal way of life in which monks live together under a shared rule. This model became the basis for the development of Christian abbeys and monastic institutions throughout Europe and the broader Christian world.

The emergence of communal religious life in both Christianity and Hinduism reflects a shared human inclination toward spiritual retreat and structured religious community, even though such institutions differ in form, theology, and purpose.

=== Laurae and Coenobia ===
At Tabennae on the Nile, in Upper Egypt, Saint Pachomius laid the foundations for the coenobitical life by arranging everything in an organized manner. He built several monasteries, each with about 1,600 separate cells laid out in lines. These cells formed an encampment where the monks slept and performed some of their manual tasks. There were nearby large halls such as the church, refectory, kitchen, infirmary, and guest house for the monk's common needs. An enclosure protecting all these buildings gave the settlement the appearance of a walled village. This layout, known as the laurae (lanes), became popular throughout Israel.

As well as the "laurae", communities known as "caenobia" developed. These were monasteries where monks lived a common life together. The monks were not permitted to retire to the cells of a laurae before they had undergone a lengthy period of training. In time, this form of common life superseded that of the older laurae.

In the late 300s AD, Palladius visited the Egyptian monasteries. He described three hundred members of the coenobium of Panopolis. There were fifteen tailors, seven smiths, four carpenters, twelve camel-drivers and fifteen tanners. These people were divided into subgroups, each with its own "oeconomus". A chief steward was at the head of the monastery.

The produce of the monastery was brought to Alexandria for sale. The moneys raised were used to purchase stores for the monastery or were given away as charity. Twice in the year, the superiors of several coenobia met at the chief monastery, under the presidency of an "archimandrite" (the "chief of the fold" from the word, "miandra" (a sheepfold)) in order to make their reports. Chrysostom recorded the workings of a coenobia in the vicinity of Antioch in Syria. The monks lived in separate huts ("kalbbia") which formed a religious hamlet on the mountainside. They were subject to an abbot, and observed a common rule.

=== Great Lavra, Mount Athos ===
Great Lavra Monastery, Mount Athos (Lenoir, who named it Santa Laura)
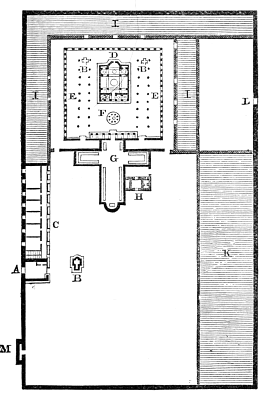
A. Gateway B. Chapels C. Guesthouse D. Church E. Cloister F. Fountain G. Refectory H. Kitchen I. Monks' cells K. Storehouses L. Postern gate M. Tower

The layout of the monastic coenobium was influenced by a number of factors. These included a need for defence, economy of space, and convenience of access. The layout of buildings became compact and orderly. Larger buildings were erected and defence was provided by strong outside walls. Within the walls, the buildings were arranged around one or more open courts surrounded by cloisters. The usual arrangement for monasteries of the Eastern world is exemplified in the plan of the convent of the Great Lavra at Mount Athos.

With reference to the diagram, right, the convent of the Great Lavra is enclosed within a strong and lofty blank stone wall. The area within the wall is between three and four acres (12,000 and 16,000 m^{2}). The longer side is about 500 feet (150 m) in length. There is only one entrance, which is located on the north side (A), defended by three iron doors. Near the entrance is a large tower (M), a constant feature in the monasteries of the Levant (Eastern Mediterranean area). There is a small postern gate at L.

The enceinte comprises two large open courts, surrounded with buildings connected with cloister galleries of wood or stone. The outer court, which is the larger by far, contains the granaries and storehouses (K), the kitchen (H) and other offices connected with the refectory (G). Immediately adjacent to the gateway is a two-storied guest-house, entered from a cloister (C). The inner court is surrounded by a cloister (EE) from which one enters the monks' cells (II).

In the centre of this court stands the katholikon or conventual church, a square building with an apse of the cruciform domical Byzantine type, approached by a domed narthex. In front of the church stands a marble fountain (F), covered by a dome supported on columns.

Opening from the western side of the cloister, but actually standing in the outer court, is the refectory (G), a large cruciform (cross shaped) building, about 100 feet (30 m) square, decorated within with frescoes of saints. At the upper end is a semicircular recess, similar to the triclinium of the Lateran Palace in Rome, in which is placed the seat of the hegumenos or abbot. This apartment is chiefly used as a meeting place, with the monks usually taking their meals in their separate cells.

=== Adoption of the Roman villa plan ===
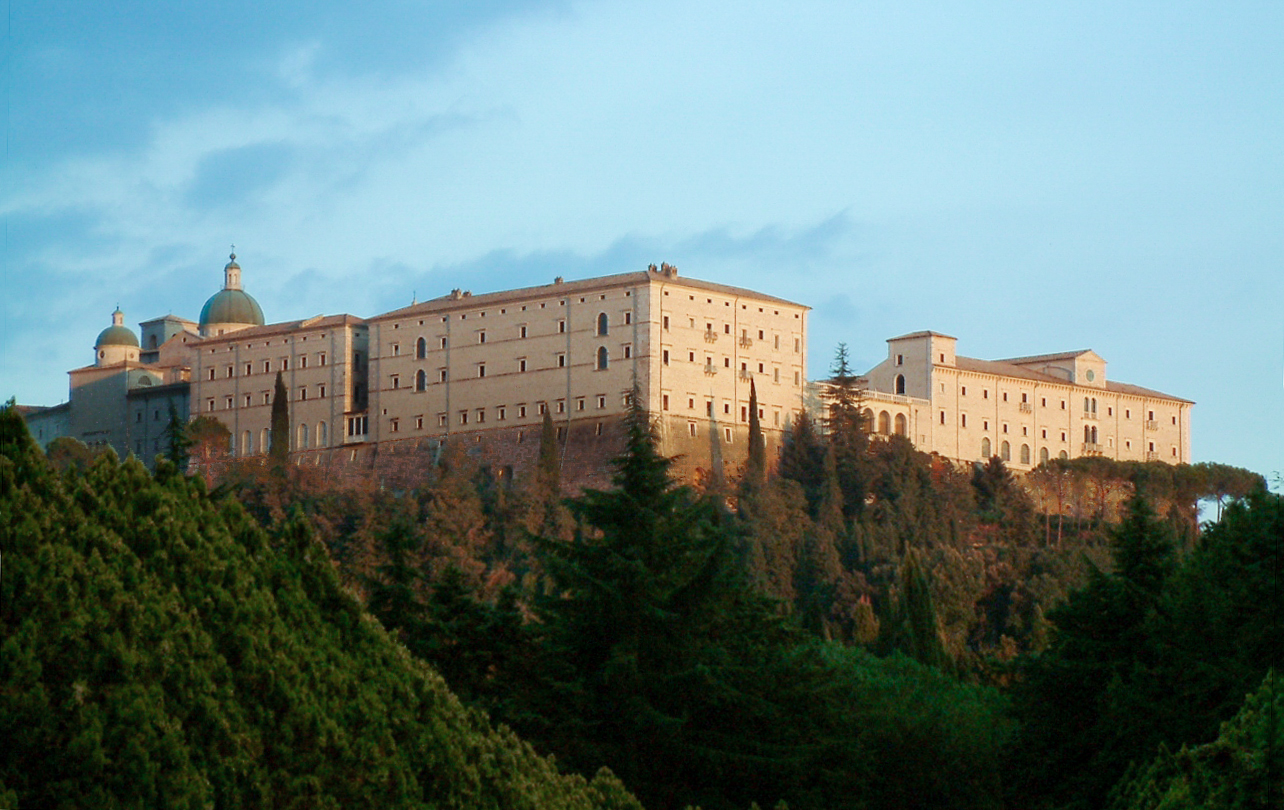
The Abbey of Monte Cassino

Monasticism in the West began with the activities of Benedict of Nursia (born 480 AD). Near Nursia, a town in Perugia, Italy, a first abbey was established at Monte Cassino (529 AD). Between 520 and 700 AD, monasteries were built which were spacious and splendid. All the city states of Italy hosted a Benedictine convent as did the cities of England, France and Spain. By 1415 AD, the time of the Council of Constance, 15,070 Benedictine monasteries had been established.

The early Benedictine monasteries, including the first at Monte Cassino, were constructed on the plan of the Roman villa. The layout of the Roman villa was quite consistent throughout the Roman Empire and where possible, the monks reused available villas in sound repair. This was done at Monte Cassino.

However, over time, changes to the common villa lay out occurred. The monks required buildings which suited their religious and day-to-day activities. No overriding specification was demanded of the monks but the similarity of their needs resulted in uniformity of design of abbeys across Europe. Eventually, the buildings of a Benedictine abbey were built in a uniform lay out, modified where necessary, to accommodate local circumstances.

=== Abbey of St Gall ===
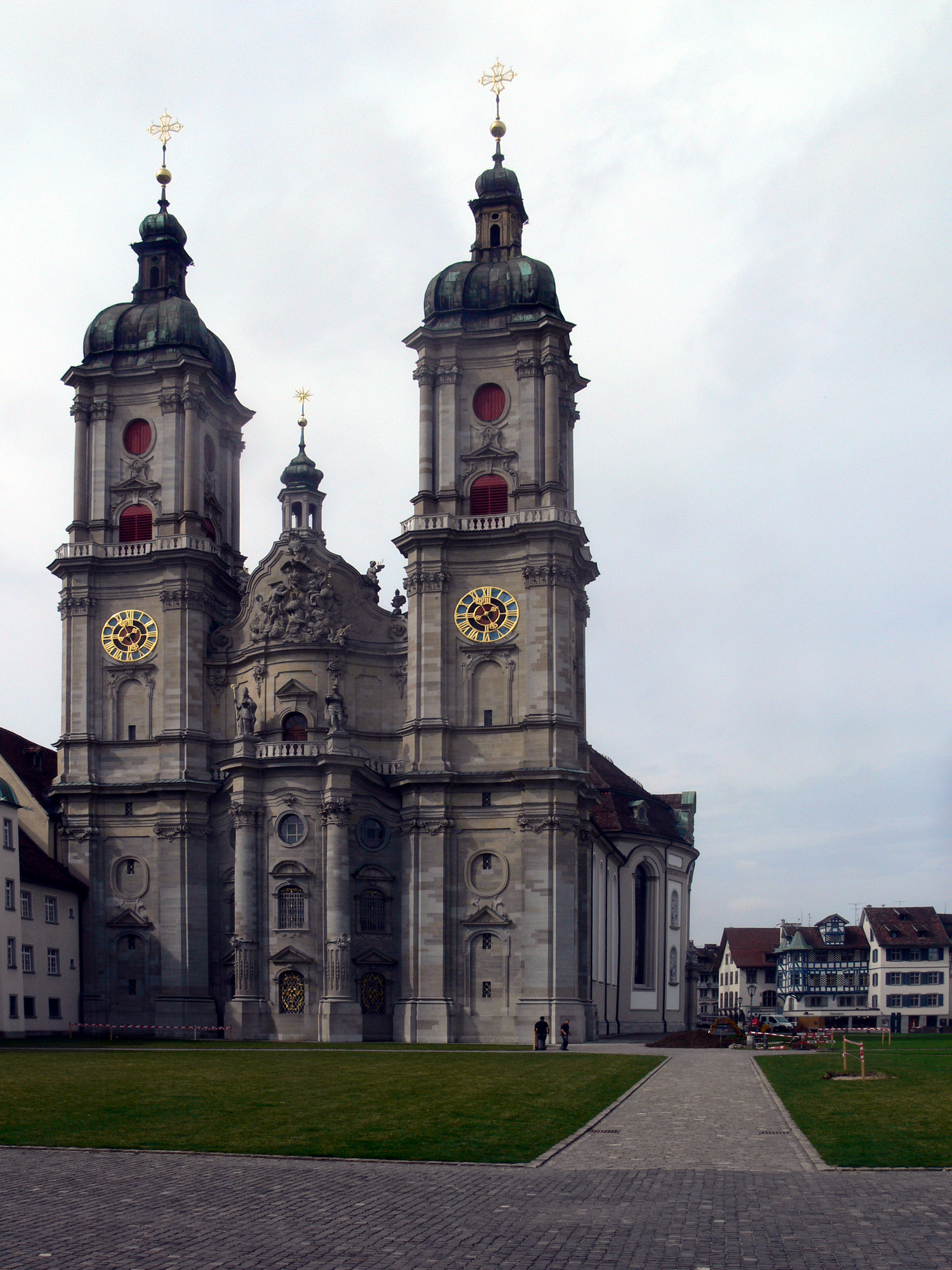
The church of the Abbey of St Gall

The plan of the Abbey of Saint Gall (719 AD) in what is now Switzerland indicates the general arrangement of a Benedictine monastery of its day. According to the architect and architectural historian Robert Willis (1800–1875), the Abbey's layout is that of a town of individual houses with streets running between them. The abbey was planned in compliance with the Benedictine rule that, if possible, a monastery should be self-contained. For instance, there was a mill, a bakehouse, stables, and cattle stalls. In all, there were thirty-three separate structures; mostly one level wooden buildings.

The Abbey church occupied the centre of a quadrangular area, about 430 feet (130 m) square. On the eastern side of the north transept of the church was the "scriptorium" or writing-room, with a library above.

The church and nearby buildings ranged about the cloister, a court about which there was a covered arcade which allowed sheltered movement between the buildings. The nave of the church was on the north boundary of the cloister.

On the east side of the cloister, on the ground floor, was the "pisalis" or "calefactory". This was a common room, warmed by flues beneath the floor. Above the common room was the dormitory. The dormitory opened onto the cloister and also onto the south transept of the church. This enabled the monks to attend nocturnal services. A passage at the other end of the dormitory lead to the "necessarium" (latrines).

On the south side of the cloister was the refectory. The kitchen, at the west end of the refectory was accessed via an anteroom and a long passage. Nearby were the bake house, brew house and the sleeping-rooms of the servants. The upper story of the refectory was called the "vestiarium" (a room where the ordinary clothes of the monks were stored).

On the western side of the cloister was another two-story building with a cellar on the ground floor and the larder and store-room on the upper floor. Between this building and the church was a parlour for receiving visitors. One door of the parlour led to the cloisters and the other led to the outer part of the Abbey.

Against the outer wall of the church was a school and headmaster's house. The school consisted of a large schoolroom divided in the middle by a screen or partition, and surrounded by fourteen little rooms, the "dwellings of the scholars". The abbot's home was near the school.

To the north of the church and to the right of the main entrance to the Abbey, was a residence for distinguished guests. To the left of the main entrance was a building to house poor travellers and pilgrims. There was also a building to receive visiting monks. These "hospitia" had a large common room or refectory surrounded by bed rooms. Each hospitium had its own brewhouse and bakehouse, and the building for more prestigious travellers had a kitchen and storeroom, with bedrooms for the guests' servants and stables for their horses. The monks of the Abbey lived in a house built against the north wall of the church.

The whole of the southern and western areas of the Abbey were devoted to workshops, stables and farm-buildings including stables, ox-sheds, goatstables, piggeries, and sheep-folds, as well as the servants' and labourers' quarters.

In the eastern part of the Abbey there was a group of buildings representing in layout, two complete miniature monasteries. That is, each had a covered cloister surrounded by the usual buildings such as the church, the refectory, the dormitory and so on. A detached building belonging to each contained a bathroom and a kitchen.

One of the miniature complexes was called the "oblati". These were the buildings for the novices. The other complex was a hospital or infirmary for the care of sick monks. This infirmary complex included a physician's residence, a physic garden, a drug store, and a chamber for the critically ill. There was also a room for bloodletting and purging. The physic garden occupied the north east corner of the Abbey.

In the southernmost area of the abbey was the workshop containing utilities for shoemakers, saddlers (or shoemakers, sellarii), cutlers and grinders, trencher-makers, tanners, curriers, fullers, smiths and goldsmiths. The tradesmen's living quarters were at the rear of the workshop. Here, there were also farm buildings, a large granary and threshing-floor, mills, and malthouse. At the south-east corner of the Abbey were hen and duck houses, a poultry-yard, and the dwelling of the keeper. Nearby was the kitchen garden which complemented the physic garden and a cemetery orchard.

Every large monastery had priories. A priory was a smaller structure or entities which depended on the monastery. Some were small monasteries accommodating five or ten monks. Others were no more than a single building serving as residence or a farm offices. The outlying farming establishments belonging to the monastic foundations were known as "villae" or "granges". They were usually staffed by lay-brothers, sometimes under the supervision of a monk.

== Benedictine abbeys in England ==
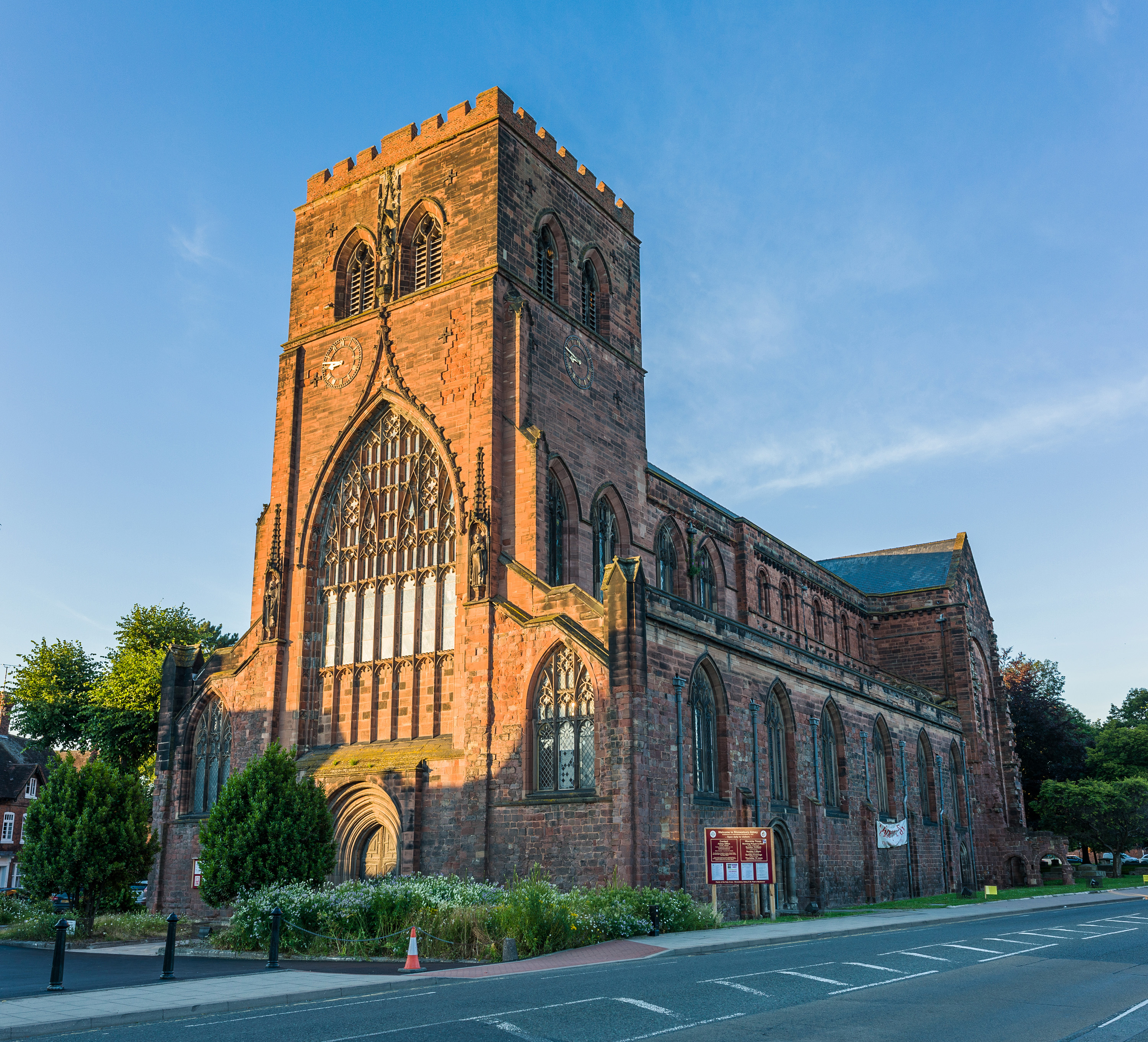
The remains of the church of Shrewsbury Abbey

Many of today's cathedrals in England were originally Benedictine monasteries. These included Canterbury, Chester, Durham, Ely, Gloucester, Norwich, Peterborough, Rochester, St Albans, Winchester, and Worcester. Shrewsbury Abbey in Shropshire was founded as a Benedictine monastery by the Normans in 1083.

=== Westminster Abbey ===
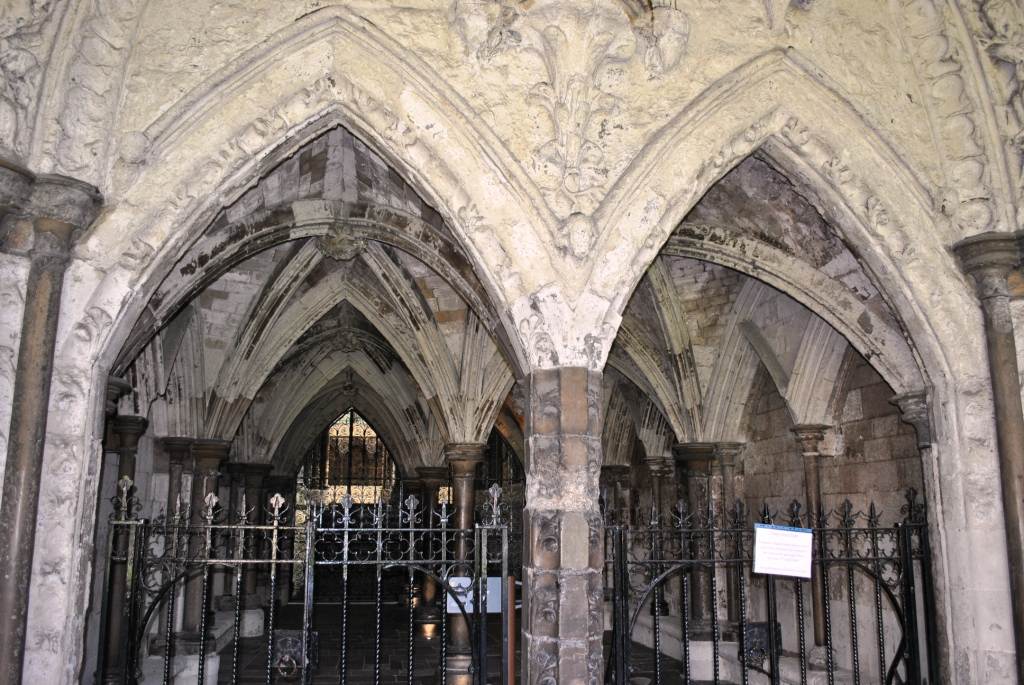
Cloisters, Westminster Abbey

Westminster Abbey was founded in the tenth century by Saint Dunstan who established a community of Benedictine monks. The only traces of St Dunstan's monastery remaining are round arches and massive supporting columns of the undercroft and the Pyx Chamber.

The cloister and buildings lie directly to the south of the church. Parallel to the nave, on the south side of the cloister, was a refectory, with a lavatory at the door. On the eastern side, there was a dormitory, raised on a vaulted substructure and communicating with the south transept and a chapter house (meeting room). A small cloister lay to the south-east of the large cloister. Beyond that was an infirmary with a table hall and a refectory for those who were able to leave their chambers. At the west entrance to the Abbey, there was a house and a small courtyard for the abbot.

=== St Mary's Abbey, York ===
In 1055, St Mary's Abbey, York was built in England's north by the Order of Saint Benedict. It followed the common plan. The entrance to the abbey was through a strong gate on the northern side. Close to the entrance was a chapel. This was for visitors arriving at the Abbey to make their devotions. Near the gate was the hospitium (guest hall). The buildings are completely ruined, but the walls of the nave and the cloisters are still visible on the grounds of the Yorkshire Museum.

The Abbey was surrounded by fortified walls on three sides. The River Ouse bordered the fourth side. The stone walls remain as an excellent example of English abbey walls.

== Reforms at the Abbey of Cluny ==
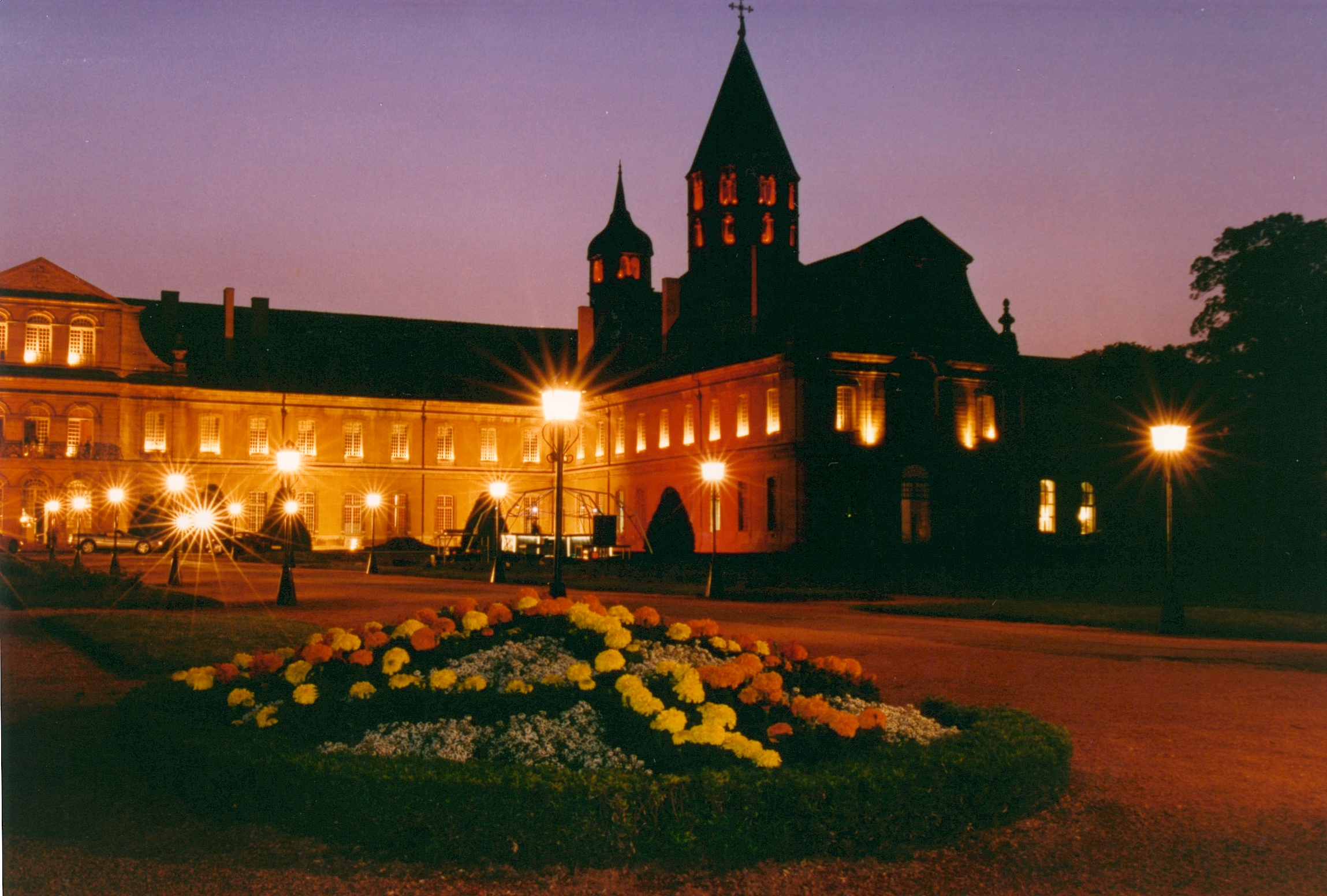
Abbey of Cluny in lights

The Abbey of Cluny was founded by William I, Duke of Aquitaine in 910 AD at Cluny, Saône-et-Loire, France. The Abbey was built in the Romanesque style. The Abbey was noted for its strict observance of the Rule of Saint Benedict. However, reforms resulted in many departures from this precedent. The Cluniac Reforms brought focus to the traditions of monastic life, encouraging art and the caring of the poor. The reforms quickly spread by the founding of new abbey complexes and by adoption of the reforms by existing abbeys. By the twelfth century, the Abbey of Cluny was the head of an order consisting of 314 monasteries.

The church at the Abbey was commenced in 1089 AD by Hugh of Cluny, the sixth abbot. It was finished and consecrated by Pope Innocent II around 1132 AD. The church was regarded as one of the wonders of the Middle Ages. At 555 feet (169 m) in length, it was the largest church in Christendom until the completion of St Peter's Basilica in Rome. The church consisted of five naves, a narthex (ante-church) which was added in 1220 AD, and several towers. Together with the conventual buildings, it covered an area of twenty-five acres.

In the Dechristianization of France during the French Revolution in 1790 AD, the Abbey church was bought by the town and almost entirely destroyed. As of 2025, however, fragments of the original Abbey still stand and archaeological excavations have intermittently been conducted over the past century, yielding a massively important and rich source of information.

=== British Cluniac houses ===
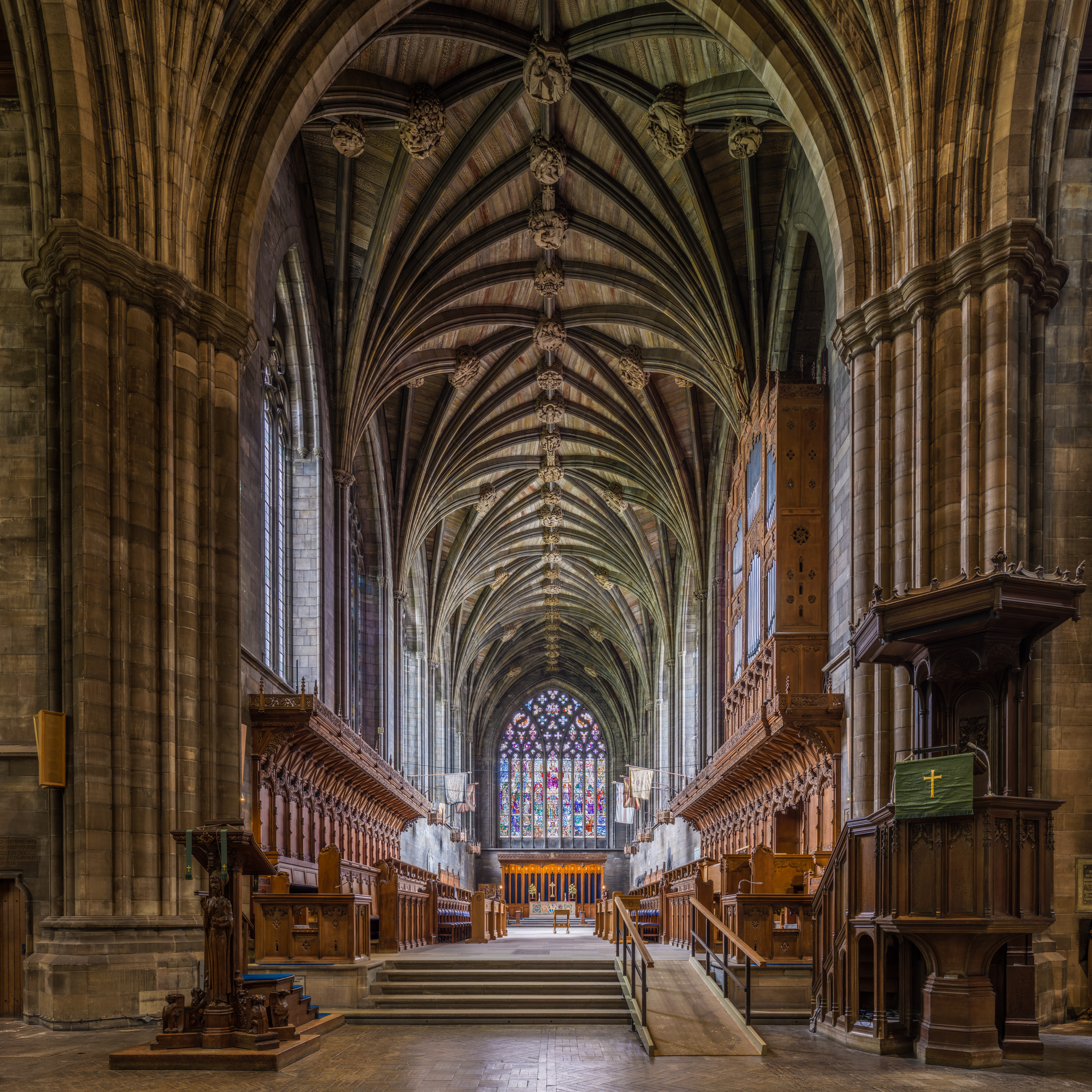
Interior facing east, Paisley Abbey

The first English house of the Cluniac order was built at Lewes, Sussex. It was founded by William de Warenne, 1st Earl of Surrey in about 1077 AD. All but one of the Cluniac houses in Britain were known as priories, symbolizing their subordination to the Abbot of Cluny. All the Cluniac houses in England and Scotland were French colonies, governed by French priors who travelled to the Abbey of Cluny to consult or be consulted (unless the abbot of Cluny chose to come to Britain, which happened rarely). The priory at Paisley was an exception. In 1245 AD it was raised to the status of an abbey, answerable only to the Pope.

== Abbeys of the Augustinian Canons ==
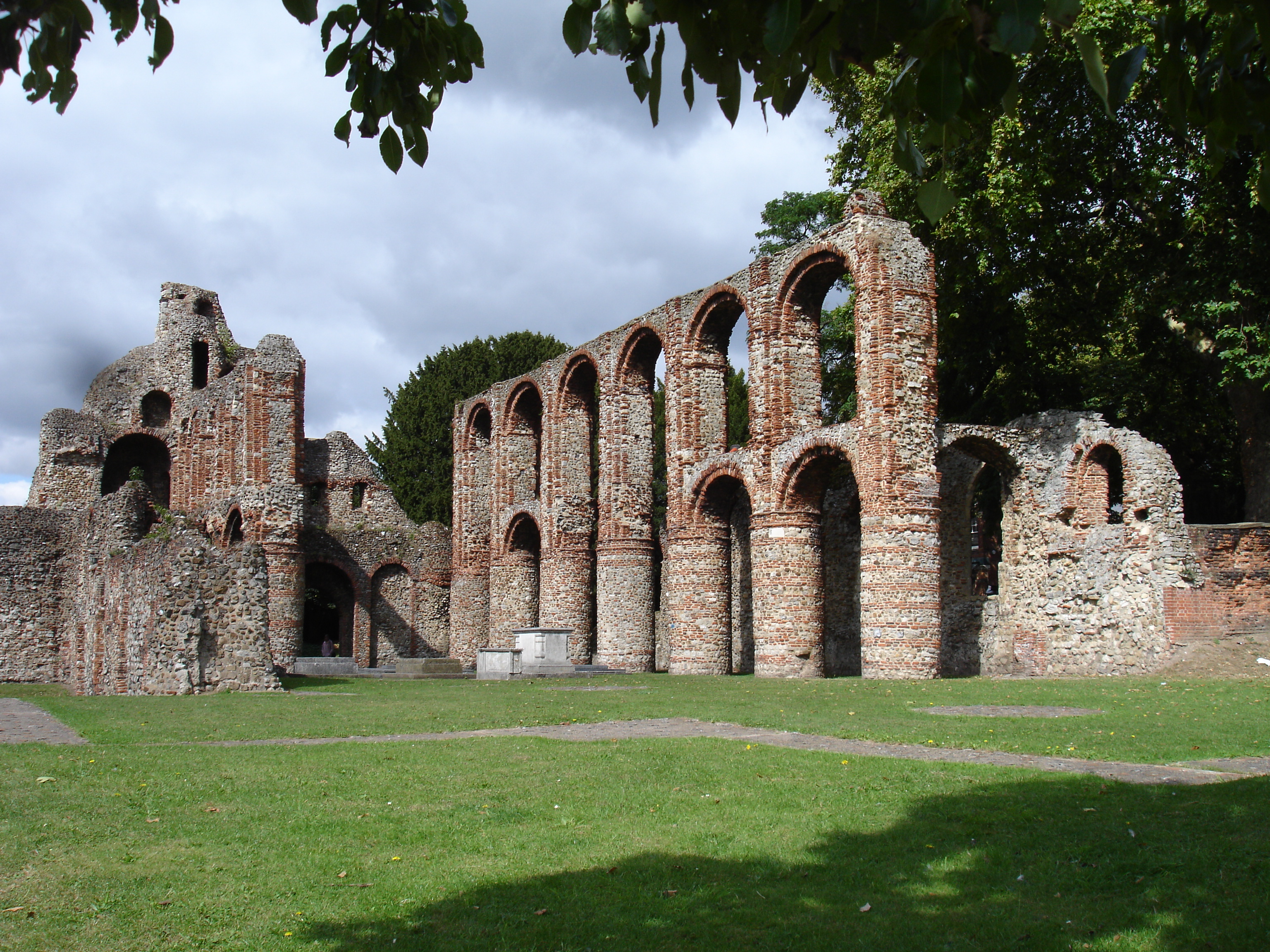
The nave of St Botolph's Priory, Colchester

The Augustinian (or "Austin") canons is an order of regular clergy within the hierarchy of the Catholic church. They hold a position between monks and secular canons. They were known as "Black canons" because of the colour of their habits. In 1105 AD, the first house of the order was established at St Botolph's Priory, Colchester, Essex.

The canons built very long naves to accommodate large congregations. The choirs were also long. Sometimes, as at Llanthony Priory and Christchurch, Dorset (Twynham), the choir was closed from the aisles. At other abbeys of the order, such as Bolton Abbey or Kirkham Priory, there were no aisles. The nave in the northern houses of the order often had only a north aisle (this is the case at Bolton, Brinkburn Priory and Lanercost Priory). The arrangement of the monastic buildings followed the ordinary plan. The prior's lodge was usually attached to the southwest angle of the nave.

The Austin canons' house at Thornton, Lincolnshire had a large gatehouse. The upper floors of the gatehouse formed the guest-house. The chapter-house was octagonal in shape.

== Augustinian abbeys ==
=== Premonstratensians (Norbertians) ===
The Premonstratensian regular canons, or "White canons", is an order founded in 1119 AD by Norbert of Xanten. The order is a reformed branch of the Augustinian canons. From a marshy area in the Forest of Coucy in the diocese of Laon, the order spread widely. Even in Norbert's lifetime, the order had built abbeys in Aleppo, Syria, and in the Kingdom of Jerusalem. Of the Abbey of Saint Samuel, Denys Pringle wrote, "The Premonstatensian abbey of Saint Samuel was a daughter house of Prémontré itself. Its abbot had the status of a suffragan of the patriarch of Jerusalem, with the right to a cross, but not to a mitre nor a ring." It long maintained its rigid austerity, though in later years the abbey grew wealthier, and its members indulged in more frequent luxuries.

Just after 1140 AD, the Premonstratensians were brought to England. Their first settlement was at Newhouse Abbey, Lincolnshire, near the Humber tidal estuary. There were as many as thirty-five Premonstratensian abbeys in England. The head abbey in England was at Welbeck Abbey but the best preserved are Easby Abbey in Yorkshire, and Bayham Old Abbey in Kent.

The layout of Easby Abbey is irregular due to its position on the edge of a steep river bank. The cloister is duly placed on the south side of the church, and the chief buildings occupy their usual positions around it. However, the cloister garth (quadrangle), as at Chichester, is not rectangular, and thus, all the surrounding buildings are positioned in an awkward fashion. The church follows the plan adopted by the Austin canons in their northern abbeys, and has only one aisle to the north of the nave, while the choir is long, narrow and without an aisle. Each transept has an aisle to the east, forming three chapels.

The church at Bayham Old Abbey had no aisles in the nave or the choir. The latter terminated in a three-sided apse. The church is remarkable for its extreme narrowness in proportion to its length. While the building is 257 ft (78 m) long, it is not more than 25 ft (7.6 m) wide. Premonstratensian canons did not care to have congregations nor possessions. Therefore, they built their churches in the shape of a long room.

== Cistercian abbeys ==
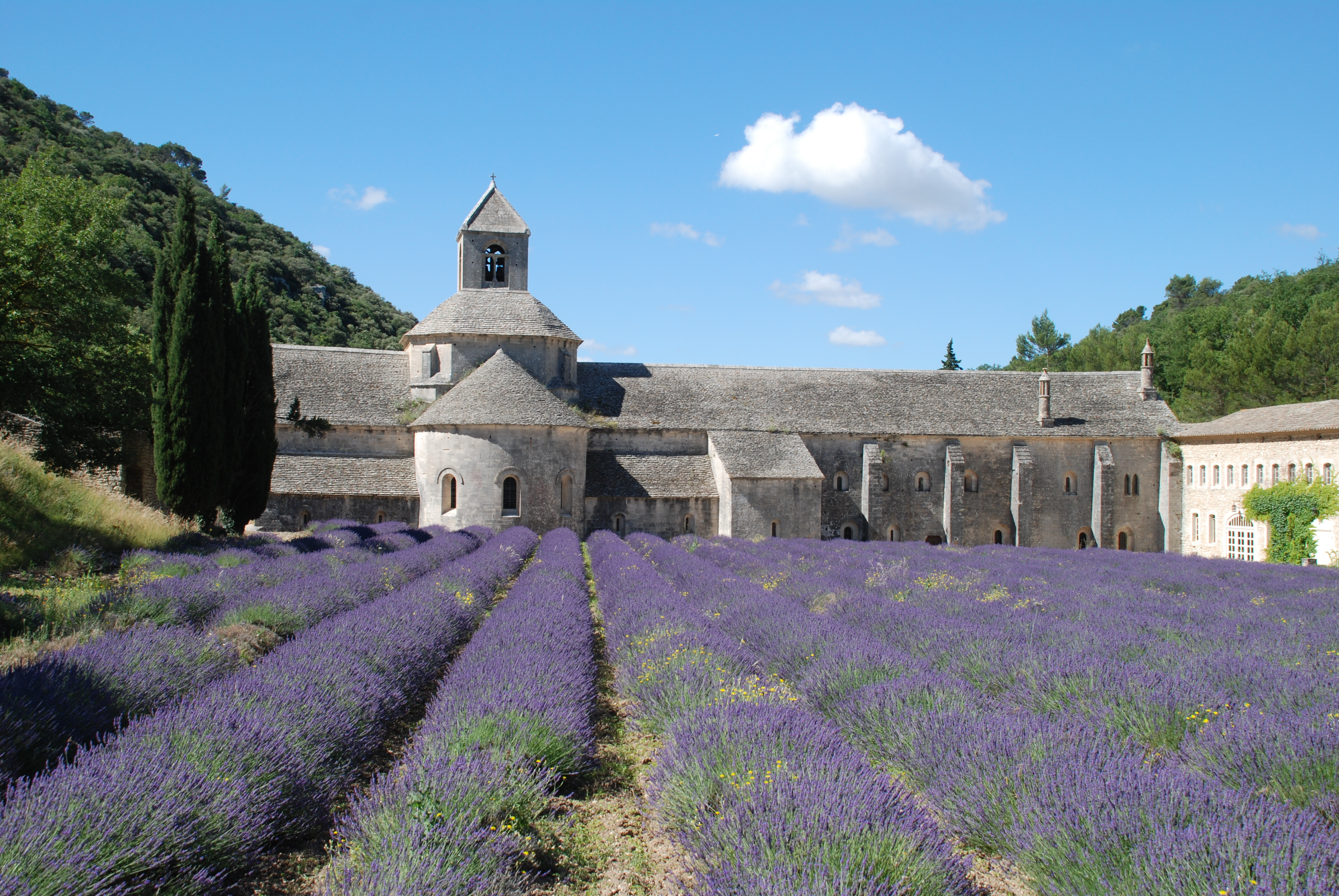
Cistercian Abbey of Sénanque

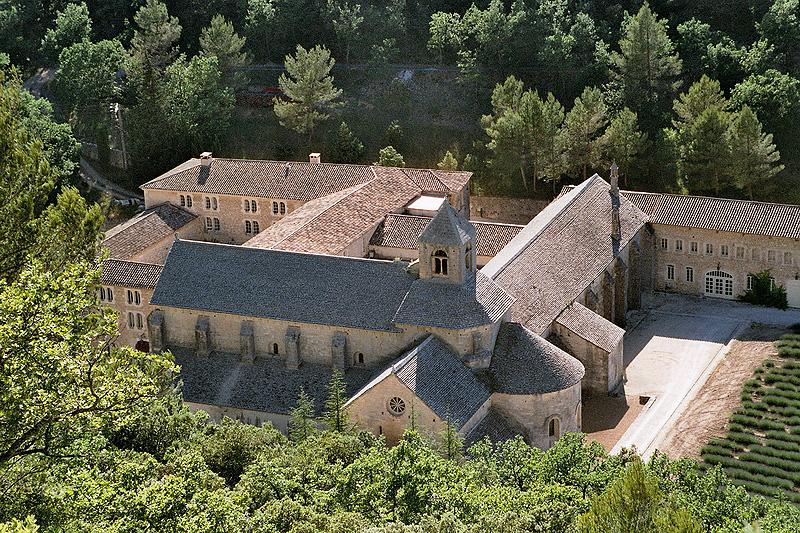
Cistercian Abbey of Sénanque

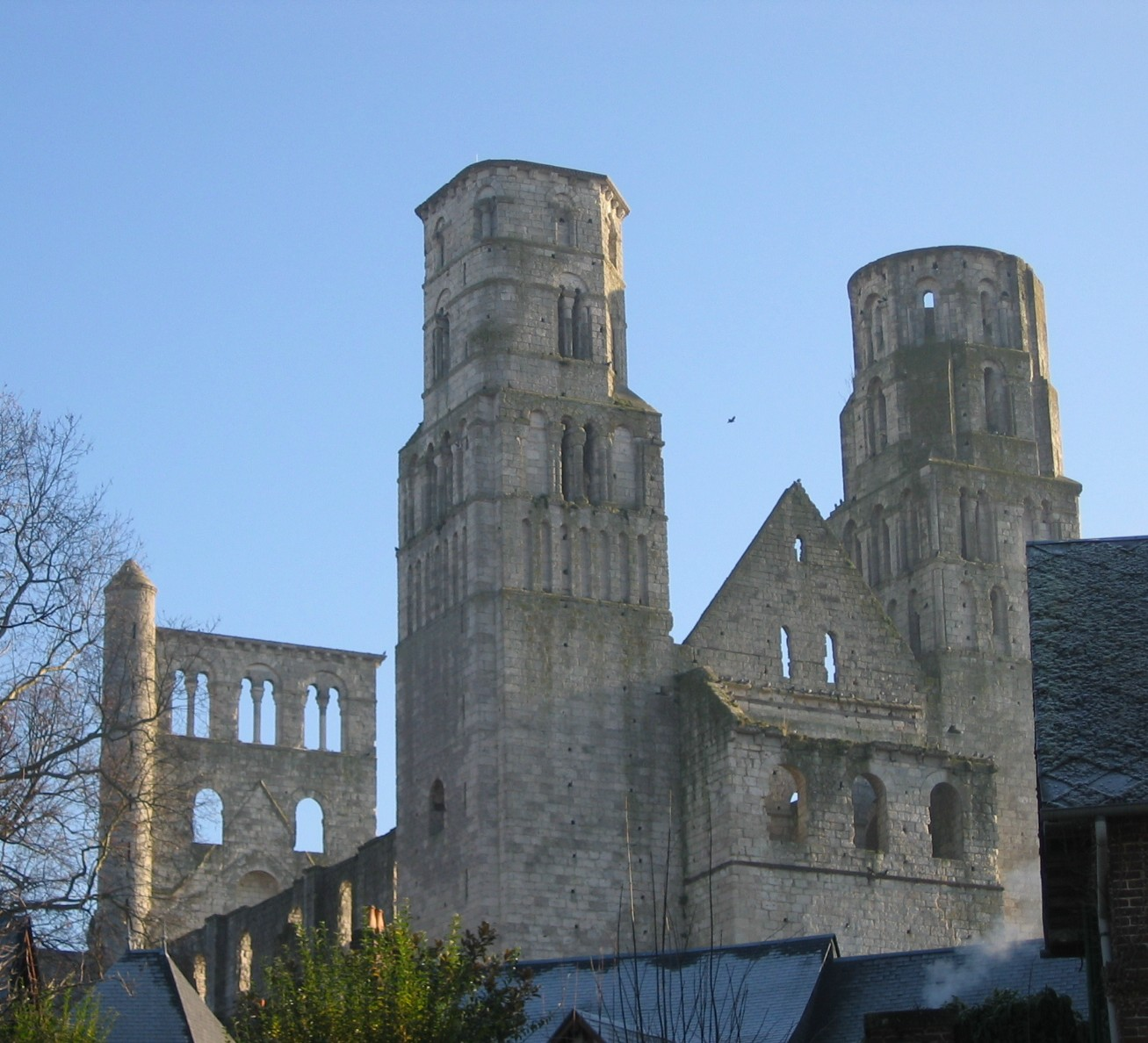
Jumièges Abbey, Normandy

The Cistercians, a Benedictine reform group, were established at Cîteaux in 1098 AD by Robert of Molesme, Abbot of Molesme, for the purpose of restoring, as far as possible, the literal observance of the Rule of Saint Benedict. La Ferté, Pontigny, Clairvaux, and Morimond were the first four abbeys to follow Cîteaux's example and others followed. The monks of Cîteaux created the well known vineyards of Clos-Vougeot and Romanée in Burgundy.

The Cistercian principle of rigid self-abnegation carried over to the design of the order's churches and buildings. The defining architectural characteristic of the Cistercian abbeys was extreme simplicity and plainness. Only a single, central tower was permitted, and that was usually very low. Unnecessary pinnacles and turrets were prohibited. The triforium was omitted. The windows were usually plain and undivided, and it was forbidden to decorate them with stained glass. All needless ornament was proscribed. The crosses were made of wood and the candlesticks of iron.

The same principle governed the choice of site for Cistercian abbeys in that a most dismal site might be improved by the building of an abbey. The Cistercian monasteries were founded in deep, well-watered valleys, always standing at a stream's edge. The building might extend over the water as is the case at Fountains Abbey. These valleys, now rich and productive, had a very different appearance when the brethren first chose them as their place of retreat. Wide swamps, deep morasses, tangled thickets, and wild, impassable forests were their prevailing features. Clara Vallis of St Bernard, now the "bright valley" was originally, the "Valley of Wormwood". It was an infamous den of robbers.

== Copts ==
The plan of a Coptic Orthodox monastery, from Lenoir, shows a church of three aisles, with cellular apses, and two ranges of cells on either side of an oblong gallery.

== See also ==
- Abbatial church of Notre-Dame de Mouzon
- Fossanuova Abbey
- Gothic cathedrals and churches
- Kirkstall Abbey
- List of abbeys and priories
- Loc-Dieu
- Rievaulx Abbey
- Strata Florida
