= Cantons of the Aveyron department =

The following is a list of the 23 cantons of the Aveyron department, in France, following the French canton reorganisation which came into effect in March 2015:

- Aubrac et Carladez
- Aveyron et Tarn
- Causse-Comtal
- Causses-Rougiers
- Ceor-Ségala
- Enne et Alzou
- Lot et Dourdou
- Lot et Montbazinois
- Lot et Palanges
- Lot et Truyère
- Millau-1
- Millau-2
- Monts du Réquistanais
- Nord-Lévezou
- Raspes et Lévezou
- Rodez-1
- Rodez-2
- Rodez-Onet
- Saint-Affrique
- Tarn et Causses
- Vallon
- Villefranche-de-Rouergue
- Villeneuvois et Villefranchois
