= Arrondissements of the Aveyron department =

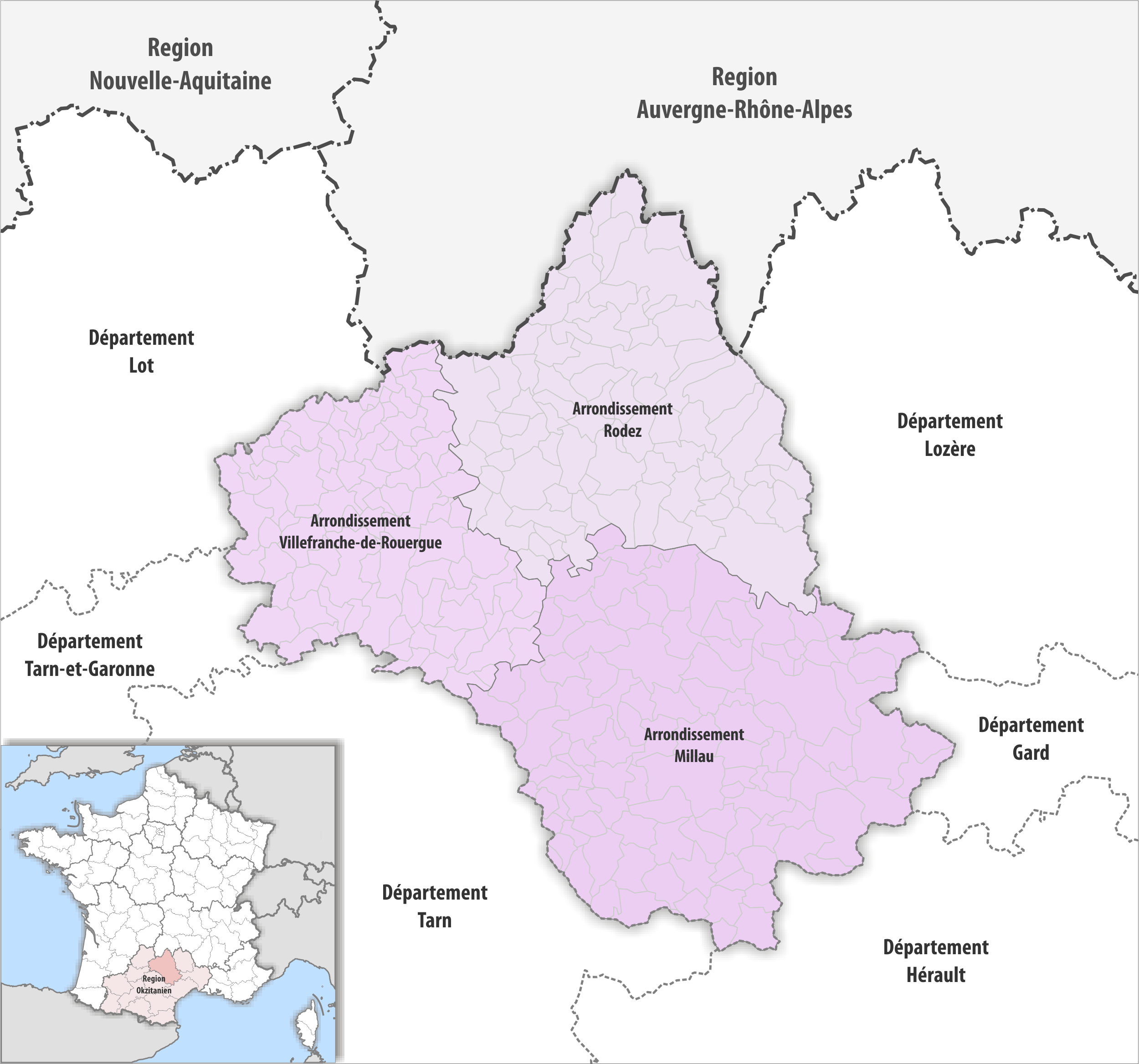
Map of arrondissements of the Aveyron department.

Since 1926, the Aveyron department, has consisted of three arrondissements.

== Composition ==
List of arrondissements of the Aveyron department on 1 January 2025
Name	Seat	Code INSEE	Number of communes	Area (km^{2})	Population (2022)	Density (per km^{2})
Arrondissement of Millau	Millau	121	110	3,741.70	79,679	21
Arrondissement of Rodez	Rodez	122	79	2,869.70	112,791	39
Arrondissement of Villefranche-de-Rouergue	Villefranche-de-Rouergu	123	96	2,123.70	87,266	41
Aveyron		12	285	8,735	279,736	32

== History ==
In 1800, the arrondissements of Rodez, Espalion, Millau, Saint-Affrique and Villefranche-de-Rouergue were established. The arrondissements of Espalion and Saint-Affrique were disbanded in 1926.

The borders of the arrondissements of Aveyron were modified in January 2017:

- six communes from the arrondissement of Millau to the arrondissement of Rodez
- 19 communes from the arrondissement of Rodez to the arrondissement of Millau
- 34 communes from the arrondissement of Rodez to the arrondissement of Villefranche-de-Rouergue
