= Saint-Beauzély =

Commune in Occitanie, France

- Commune
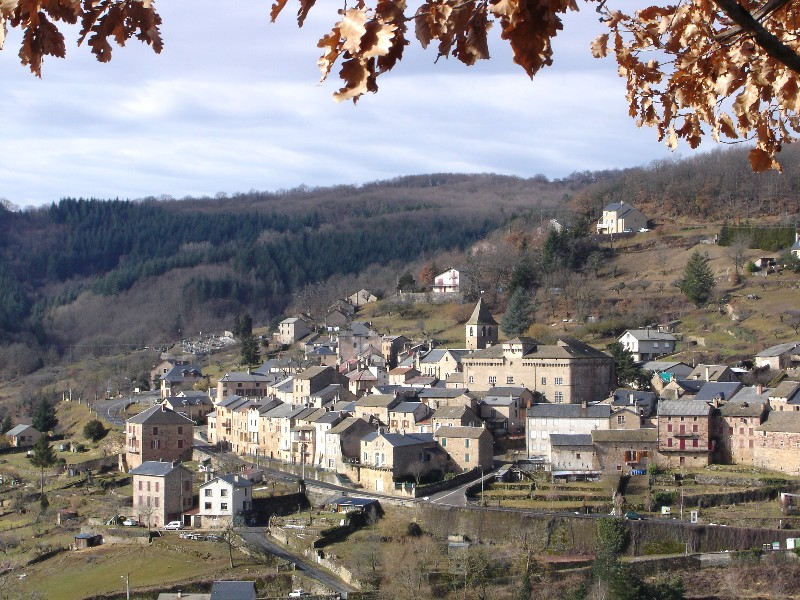
- A general view of Saint-Beauzély

- Coat of arms
- Location of Saint-Beauzély
- Location within France Location within Occitanie
- Coordinates: 44°09′57″N 2°57′31″E
- Country: France
- Region: Occitania
- Department: Aveyron
- Arrondissement: Millau
- Canton: Tarn et Causses

Government
  - Mayor (2022–2026): Mathieu Henry
- Area^{1}: 30.69 km^{2} (11.85 sq mi)
- Elevation: 620 m (2,030 ft)
- Highest elevation: 1,062 m (3,484 ft)
- Lowest elevation: 549 m (1,801 ft)
- Population (2023): 550
  - Density: 18/km^{2} (46/sq mi)
- Time zone: UTC+01:00 (CET)
  - Summer (DST): UTC+02:00 (CEST)
- INSEE/Postal code: 12213 /12620
- ^{1} French Land Register data, which excludes lakes, ponds, glaciers > 1 km^{2} (0.386 sq mi or 247 acres) and river estuaries.

Saint-Beauzély (French pronunciation: [sɛ̃ bozeli]; Languedocien: Sent Bausèli) is a commune in the Aveyron department in southern France.

== Population ==
Historical population
Year	Pop.	±% p.a.
1968	439	—
1975	408	−1.04%
1982	422	+0.48%
1990	487	+1.81%
1999	525	+0.84%
2007	512	−0.31%
2012	553	+1.55%
2017	596	+1.51%
2023	550	−1.33%
Source: INSEE

== See also ==
- Communes of the Aveyron department
