= Amans-Alexis Monteil =

French historian (1769–1850)

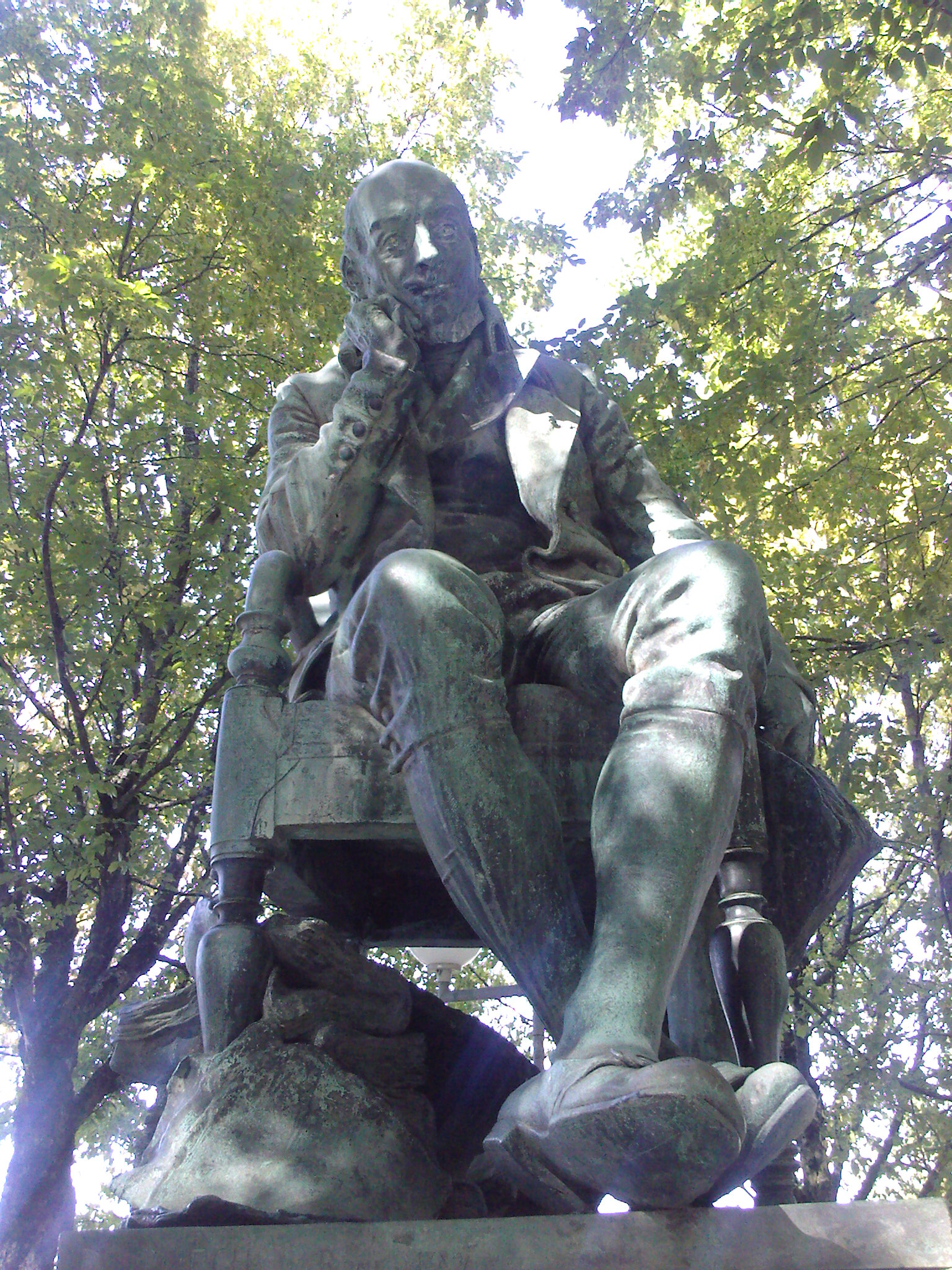

Amans-Alexis Monteil (7 June 1769 – 20 February 1850), French historian, was born at Rodez, and died at Cely (Seine-et-Marne).

His tastes were historical, and he taught history at Rodez, at Fontainebleau and at St Cyr. He held that a disproportionate importance had been given to kings, their ministers and generals, and that it was necessary rather to study the people. In his Histoire des français des divers etas, ou histoire de France aux cinq derniers siècles (10 vols, 1828–1844) he undertook to describe the different classes and occupations of the community. For this he made a collection of manuscripts, which he sold in 1835 (many of them passed into the library of Sir Thomas Philipps), drawing up a catalogue under the singular title of Traité de materiaux manuscrits de divers genres d'histoire.

He boasted of having been the first to write really "national" history, and he wished further to show this in a memoir entitled L'Influence de l'histoire des divers états, ou comment fût allée la France si elle eût eu cette histoire (1840; reprinted in 1841 under the title: Les Français pour la première fois dans l'histoire de France, ou poétique de l'histoire des divers états).

Monteil did not invent the history of civilization, but he was one of the first in France, and perhaps in Europe, to point out its extreme importance. He revised the third edition of his history himself (5 vols, 1848); a fourth appeared after his death with a preface by Jules Janin (5 vols, 1853).
