= Antoine Salvanh =

French architect

Antoine Salvanh (hamlet of Vabrette, at Ayssènes; c. 1476 – c. 1554), was a Rouergat architect from the first half of the 16th century who made the transition between the flamboyant gothic and the First Renaissance styles.

He married in 1516 with the daughter of an hotelier from Espalion of whom he had an eldest son, Jean, who was an architect and took over the work from his father.

== Biography ==
Long ignored, the life of Antoine Salvanh came out of anonymity thanks to research done in the 19th century by local archivists. We know nothing about his formative years.

His first work is known by a sales quote dating from May 1508 giving the provisions of the rood-screen of the Aubrac hospital church at Saint-Chély-d'Aubrac. This one disappeared in the 19th century, but what remained of this rood was drawn in 1833 in Les voyages pittoresques et romantiques ans l'ancienne France, Languedoc, after J. Taylor, Ch. Nodier and A. Cailleux, in 1834. The drawing shows a work from the First Renaissance which is the oldest of this style known in Rouergue.

On 17 July 1508, he was in Espalion to sign the sales quote for the portal of the église Saint-Jean-Baptiste begun in 1472. The consuls demanded a "peyra blanca" portal based on a sandstone structure. He was associated for this work with a sculptor of Cruéjouls, Guillaume Desmazes. It was the latter who signed a receipt in November 1509.

During the night of 27 to 28 April 1510, a fire ignited by plumbers spread to the frame of the spire of the bell tower dating from the 14th century of the cathédrale Notre-Dame de Rodez. The absence of the bishop, François d'Estaing, who was at the gallican council, entailed that the work on the new bell tower did not begin until 1513, the date given by Salvanh in July 1544 in a trial. The city's accounts give a start date for the work in the autumn of 1512. Sales quote were given in spring 1512 for delivery of materials ad opus edificii cloquerii Beate Marie. On this date, Bernard Anthony was still, for one year, the general contractor in charge of the cathedral's work notes that the bishop of Rodez visited the church of Saint-Jean-Baptiste d'Espalion two days after the cathedral fire and that he was in Aubrac on 10 May 1510, two churches on which Salvanh worked. Salvanh replaced him later for the realization of the new bell tower. The date 1523 engraved on the oldest bell gives an end date of construction. The lantern over it bears the date 1526, the date of completion as indicated by the inscription consommatum est 1526.

Salvanh continued work on the nave of the cathedral at the same time. The walls of the central nave were built in 1530. The vaults were made shortly afterwards and bear the date 1542. Antoine Salvanh built the chapels of the western bays because he asked in his 1552 will to be buried in the second chapel, Saint-Roch chapel, which he said he had built. The facade of the cathedral dates from the first third of the 16th century and the arms of François d'Estaing can be seen at the level of the rose. It can be seen that the style of the buildings changed from the 1520s without being sure of the designer's name: chapel of the canon Gaillard Roux or of the tomb, crenellated tribune of the canons' sacristy, fences of the choir and the roundabout. In 1529, Georges d'Armagnac was appointed Bishop of Rodez.

On 8 December 1521, the new Prior of Saint-Côme-d'Olt obtained from Guy de Castelnau, bishop of Périgueux, to enlarge the church Saint-Côme-Saint-Damien. On 12 December 1521, Antoine d'Estaing gave Salvanh the price he would pay for repairing the church. Salvanh probably limited himself to the facade. The prize was confirmed in October 1524, honoured in 1528. The ornate gate casements are dated 1532.

The church of the convent of the Annonciades of Rodez built from 1517 required rework. The administrators of the convent entrusted the repair work to Salvanh so that the building could receive the tomb of the founder, canon Hélyon Jouffroy, who died in 1529. Three contracts were awarded: the first, on 31 March 1530, to extend the church by a span, the second in 1536, for the construction of the tomb of the Franciscan father Gilbert Nicolas, the last, on 27 November 1538, for the reconstruction of the choir.

== The Salvanh ==
Salvanh was the son of Bertrand Salvanh, originally from a village near Saint-Rome-de-Tarn and the father of Jean Salvanh who continued his father's work at Rodez Cathedral.

We know a Guillaume Salvanh, native of Salles-Curan, married in 1481, and who was called in expertise by the consuls of Millau in September 1492. He was also master builder of the Rodez Cathedral in 1492–1493. The relationship between Guillaume Salvanh and Antoine Salvanh is unknown. Maybe he was his uncle. These family ties, if they existed, could explain the formation of Antoine Salvanh and his knowledge of the high clergy of Rouergue, in particular of the two brothers, François d'Estaing, bishop of Rodez, and Antoine d'Estaing, prior of Aubrac, then bishop of Angoulême.

=== Bibliography ===
- Étienne Hamon, Itinéraire d'un architecte rouergat entre gothique flamboyant et Renaissance : l'œuvre d'Antoine Salvanh, p. 51-70, in Du gothique à la Renaissance. Architecture et décor en France 1470–1550, Publications de l'Université de Provence, Aix-en-Provence, 2003 ISBN 2-85399-538-0
- Jacques Baudoin, La sculpture flamboyante en Rouergue, Languedoc, p. 38, 53, 61, 74, 214, Éditions Créer, Nonette, 2003 ISBN 2-909797-85-6Extraits
- Louis Bion de Marlavagne, Histoire de la cathédrale de Rodez: avec pièces justificatives et de nombreux documents sur les églises et les anciens artistes du Rouergue, ornée de 27 gravures, 1875; p. 423
- Henri Affre, Biographie aveyronnaise, printing press H. de Broca, 1881; p. 383
- Henri Affre, Lettres sur l'histoire de Rodez, printing press H. de Broca, 1874; p. 576
- Charles Bauchal, Nouveau dictionnaire biographique et critique des architectes français, p. 522-523, A. Daly fils et Cie, Paris, 1887 (Read online (views 542–543))
