= Aurelle-Verlac =

Part of Saint-Geniez-d'Olt-et-d'Aubrac in Occitanie, France

- Part of Saint-Geniez-d'Olt-et-d'Aubrac
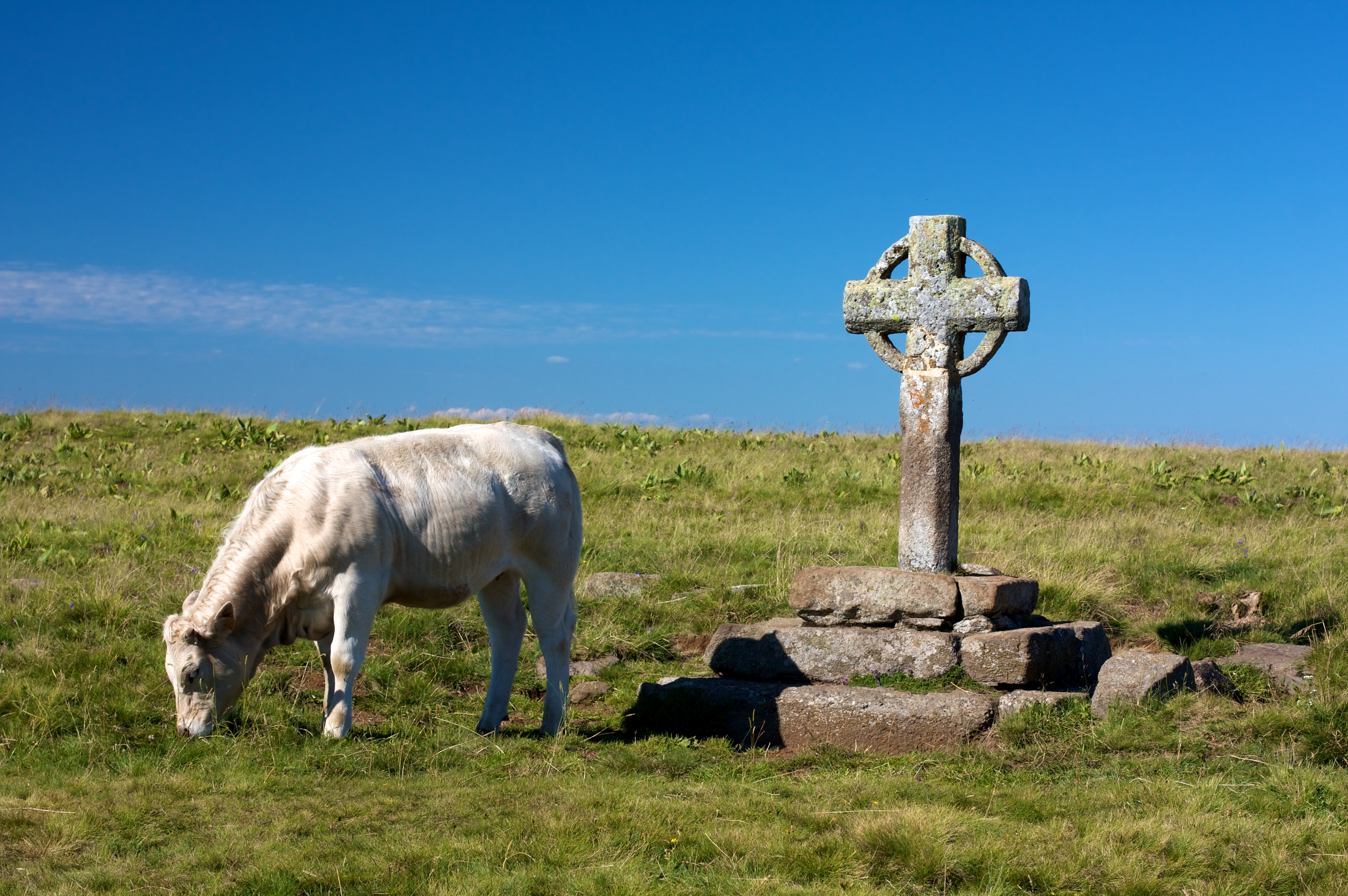
- Wayside Cross in Aurelle-Verlac

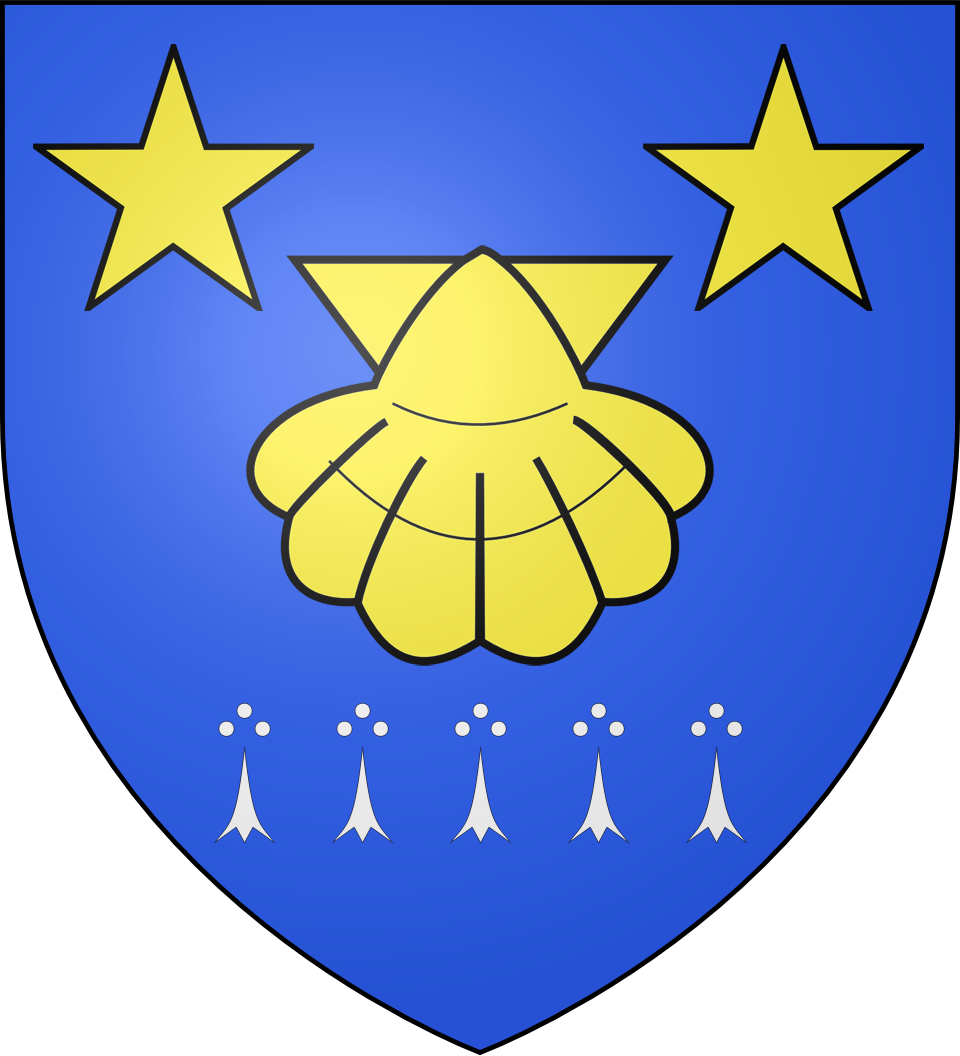
- Coat of arms
- Location of Aurelle-Verlac
- Location within France Location within Occitanie
- Coordinates: 44°30′25″N 3°00′29″E
- Country: France
- Region: Occitania
- Department: Aveyron
- Arrondissement: Rodez
- Canton: Lot et Palanges
- Commune: Saint-Geniez-d'Olt-et-d'Aubrac
- Area^{1}: 54.68 km^{2} (21.11 sq mi)
- Elevation: 1,000 m (3,300 ft)
- Highest elevation: 1,461 m (4,793 ft)
- Lowest elevation: 500 m (1,600 ft)
- Population (2023): 135
  - Density: 2.47/km^{2} (6.39/sq mi)
- Time zone: UTC+01:00 (CET)
  - Summer (DST): UTC+02:00 (CEST)
- Postal code: 12130
- ^{1} French Land Register data, which excludes lakes, ponds, glaciers > 1 km^{2} (0.386 sq mi or 247 acres) and river estuaries.

Aurelle-Verlac (French pronunciation: [oʁɛl vɛʁlak]; Languedocien: Aurèla e Verlac) is a former commune in the Aveyron department in the Occitanie region of southern France. On 1 January 2016, it was merged into the new commune of Saint-Geniez-d'Olt-et-d'Aubrac.

== Geography ==
Aurelle-Verlac is located in the Massif Central in Aubrac some 60 km east of Decazeville and 70 km south-east of Aurillac with the eastern border of the commune being the border between Aveyron and Lozère departments. Access to the commune is by road D503 from Saint-Geniez-d'Olt in the south which goes north through the village and most of the length of the commune before going west to join the D219 west of the commune. Apart from the village there are the hamlets of Crespiac, Verelaguet, Les Mazes, La Frassinede, Naves d'Aubrac, La Molière, Moncan, Rieuzens, Bernie, Les Caps, and Les Ginestes. The commune is mainly deep valleys where boraldes flow down to the Lot. The highest point in the department is on the Signal de Mailhe-Biau in the north-east of the commune. It is located in a Natura 2000 zone and is rugged with forests and high country farming.

The Ruisseau de Mardonenque rises in the north and flows south down the centre of the commune gathering tributaries including the Ruisseau de Monette, the Ravin de Placaus, the Ravin des Rives, the Ravin de la Coste, the Ravin de la Ligue, and the Ruisseau de Rioubasset, which forms the south-eastern border, before continuing south to join the Lot near Saint-Geniez-d'Olt. The Ruisseau de Bonance also rises in the north of the commune and flows south towards the eastern side of the commune forming part of the eastern border before continuing south to join the Lot near Pomayrols. On the western side of the commune the Merdanson forms the western border of the commune as it flows south to join the Lot near Cabanac. The Ruisseau de Rioudis and the Ruisseau de Mandialou both rise in the commune and join the Merdanson on the western border.

=== Heraldry ===
Arms of Aurelle-Verlac	These arms are Canting arms with the gold referring to the commune name and the silver to silver mines. Blazon: Azure, an escallop in Or between in chief two mullets the same and in base 5 Ermine spots in Argent arranged in fess.

== Administration ==
List of Successive Mayors

Mayors from the French Revolution to 1919

From	To	Name	Party	Position
1793	1797	Pierre Jean Duarn		
1798	1801	Jean Claude Galdemar		
1802	1816	Jean Bach		
1816	1822	Antoine Niel		
1822	1827	Jean Pierre Auguy		
1827	1831	François Joseph Rauquayrol		
1831	1849	Jean Pierre Auguy		
1849	1851	Jacques Poujol		
1852	1857	Jean Pierre Auguy		
1857	1864	Jean Antoine Alazard		
1864	1870	Baptiste Mounie		
1870	1878	Jean Pierre Auguy		
1878	1884	Etienne Marcilhac		
1884	1884	Louis Alazard		
1884	1902	Louis Miquel		
1902	1919	Louis Alazard		

Mayors from 1919

From	To	Name	Party	Position
1919	1947	Antoine Alazard		
1947	1965	Théophile Auguy		
1965	1971	Jean Foulquier		
1971	1983	Jean Vialard		
1983	2008	Paul Garces		
2008	2016	Jean-Pierre Niel		

== Demography ==
The inhabitants of the commune are known as Aurellacois or Aurellacoises in French.

Historical population

Year	Pop.	±% p.a.
1793	1,810	—
1800	1,696	−0.93%
1846	1,068	−1.00%
1851	1,085	+0.32%
1856	1,065	−0.37%
1861	1,025	−0.76%
1866	1,075	+0.96%
1872	1,007	−1.08%
1876	1,029	+0.54%
1881	1,022	−0.14%
1886	1,048	+0.50%
1891	990	−1.13%
1896	971	−0.39%
1901	896	−1.59%
1906	903	+0.16%
1911	832	−1.62%

Year	Pop.	±% p.a.
1921	726	−1.35%
1926	705	−0.59%
1931	653	−1.52%
1936	614	−1.22%
1946	494	−2.15%
1954	478	−0.41%
1962	435	−1.17%
1968	380	−2.23%
1975	333	−1.87%
1982	270	−2.95%
1990	246	−1.16%
1999	209	−1.79%
2007	177	−2.06%
2012	164	−1.51%
2023	135	−1.75%

Source: EHESS and INSEE

== Culture and heritage ==
=== Civil heritage ===
- The Fortified Farm of Aubignac

=== Religious heritage ===
The commune has two religious buildings that are registered as historical monuments:

- The Church of Saint-Jacques de Verlac (11th century) is Romanesque and depended on the Abbey of La Chaise-Dieu. It is located in the village centre surrounded by a small cemetery and built from local materials: schist for the walls, basalt, tuff, and sandstone for the cut stones. Its plan consists of a single nave with pointed columns terminated by an apse in a cul-de-four design. Two chapels, built later, act as transepts. The church contains a Bronze Bell (16th century) which is registered as a historical object.
- The Church of Saint-Pierre d'Aurelle (1384) is the smallest Romanesque church in France. It has a unique history. In 1382, on the pretext of the arrival of the English, the Marquis of Beaufort, Baron of Aurelle, destroyed the church. On being excommunicated, he was obliged by the bishop to rebuild the church in a year. The new church was rebuilt inside the village in 1384 with the old materials.
- The Church of Saint-Martin-de-Montbon contains a Bronze Bell (1762) which is registered as a historical object.

Other religious structures of interest

- The Rode Cross was erected by the lord of Peyre in 1377.
- The Berque Cross is located at Les Mazes rising from the Vergnes Cross. It was built in 1531 and marked the boundary of the barony of Aurelle between the dom (Note: A name given to certain religious, particularly in the Benedictine, Carthusian, and Trappist orders.) lands of Aubrac and those of the Marquis of Canilhac. On one of its faces it has an expressive though stylized virgin with child.

== Bibliography ==
- Christian-Pierre Bedel, Sent-Ginièis, Aurela-Verlac, Pèira-Ficha, Pomairòls, Pradas, Senta-Aularia / Christian-Pierre Bedel and the inhabitants of the commune of Sent-Ginièis, Rodez, Mission départementale de la culture, 1991, Al canton collection, 230 pages, ill., cov. ill., 28 cm, ISBN 2-907279-07-6, ISSN 1151-8375, BnF 36653864f (in Occitan and French)

== See also ==
- Communes of the Aveyron department
