= Pierrefiche =

Pierrefiche is the name of two communes in France:

- Pierrefiche, in the Aveyron département
- Pierrefiche, in the Lozère département
