= Coussergues =

Part of Palmas-d'Aveyron in Occitanie, France

- Part of Palmas-d'Aveyron
- Coat of arms
- Location of Coussergues
- Location within France Location within Occitanie
- Coordinates: 44°24′44″N 2°52′40″E
- Country: France
- Region: Occitania
- Department: Aveyron
- Arrondissement: Rodez
- Canton: Lot et Palanges
- Commune: Palmas-d'Aveyron
- Area^{1}: 10.89 km^{2} (4.20 sq mi)
- Elevation: 604 m (1,982 ft)
- Highest elevation: 738 m (2,421 ft)
- Lowest elevation: 582 m (1,909 ft)
- Population (2023): 264
  - Density: 24.2/km^{2} (62.8/sq mi)
- Time zone: UTC+01:00 (CET)
  - Summer (DST): UTC+02:00 (CEST)
- Postal code: 12310
- ^{1} French Land Register data, which excludes lakes, ponds, glaciers > 1 km^{2} (0.386 sq mi or 247 acres) and river estuaries.

Coussergues (French pronunciation: [kusɛʁɡ]; Languedocien: Cossèrgas) is a former commune in the Aveyron department in southern France. On 1 January 2016, it was merged into the new commune of Palmas-d'Aveyron.

== See also ==
- Communes of the Aveyron department
