= 12017 =

12017 may refer to:

- 12017, a minor planet without a naming citation
- 2017, a year of the Gregorian calendar, corresponding to 12017 in the Holocene calendar
- Austerlitz, New York, United States (ZIP code)
- Ayssènes, France (INSEE code)
- Dehradun Shatabdi Express, an Indian Railways train which operates as train number 12017 from New Delhi to Dehradun
- Robilante, Italy (postal code)
