= Palmas, Aveyron =

Part of Palmas-d'Aveyron in Occitanie, France

Palmas
- Part of Palmas-d'Aveyron
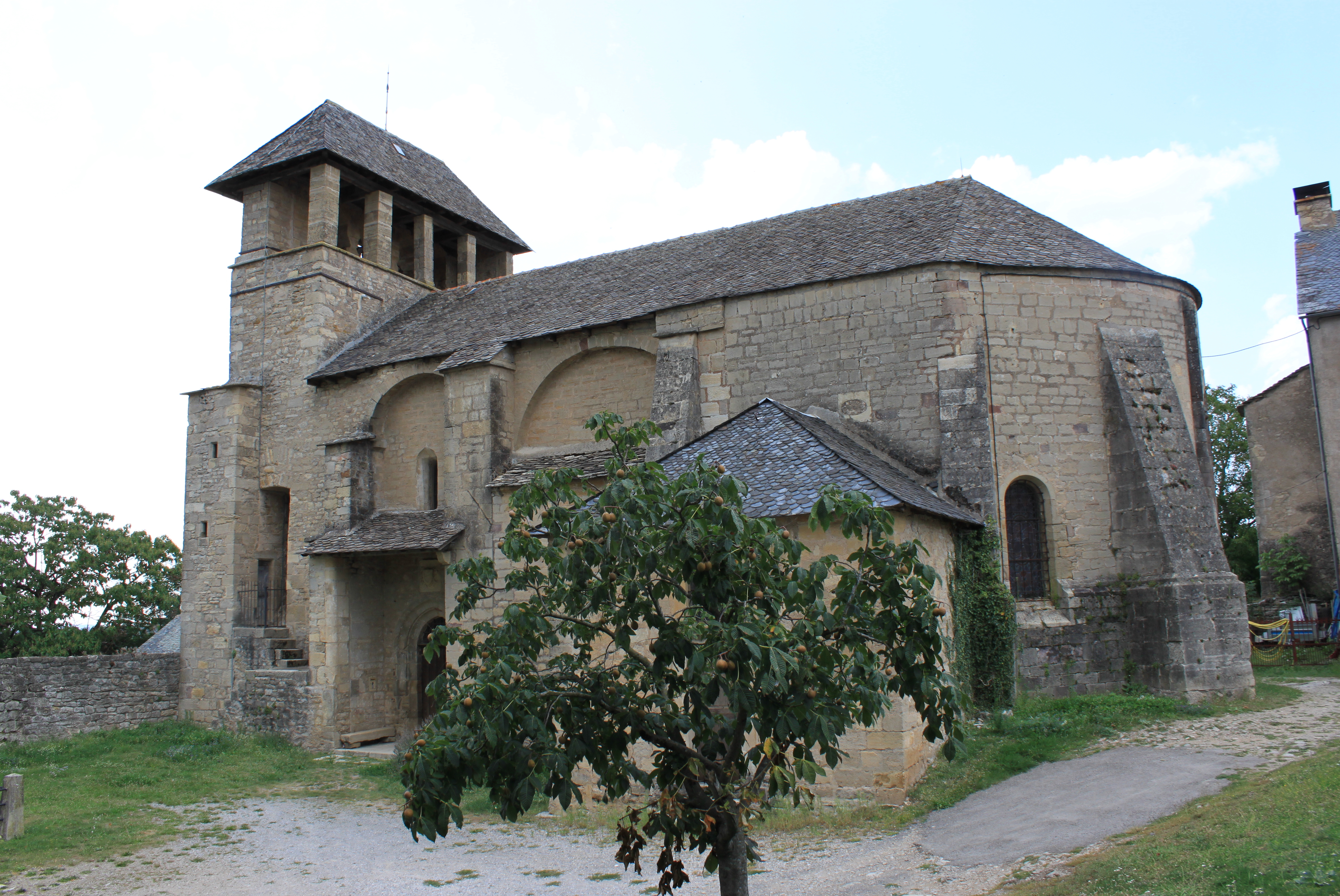
- The church in Palmas
- Location of Palmas
- Location within France Location within Occitanie
- Coordinates: 44°23′43″N 2°50′36″E
- Country: France
- Region: Occitania
- Department: Aveyron
- Arrondissement: Rodez
- Canton: Lot et Palanges
- Commune: Palmas-d'Aveyron
- Area^{1}: 14.34 km^{2} (5.54 sq mi)
- Elevation: 630 m (2,070 ft)
- Highest elevation: 697 m (2,287 ft)
- Lowest elevation: 572 m (1,877 ft)
- Population (2023): 382
  - Density: 26.6/km^{2} (69.0/sq mi)
- Time zone: UTC+01:00 (CET)
  - Summer (DST): UTC+02:00 (CEST)
- Postal code: 12310
- ^{1} French Land Register data, which excludes lakes, ponds, glaciers > 1 km^{2} (0.386 sq mi or 247 acres) and river estuaries.

Palmas (Languedocien: Palmàs) is a former commune in the Aveyron department in southern France. On 1 January 2016, it was merged into the new commune of Palmas-d'Aveyron.

== See also ==
- Communes of the Aveyron department
