= Jean Salvanh =

French architect

Jean Salvanh (between 1515 and 1520 in Rodez – after 1580) was a 16th-century French architect.

== Biography ==
Upon the death of his father, Antoine Salvanh, he succeeded him as master builder of the cathedral. An act dated 24 October 1554, drawn up by Antoine Fournier, notary in Rodez, gives him this title.

The bishop of Rodez was then Georges d'Armagnac. Guillaume Philandrier, was the bishop's secretary and was appointed canon of the cathedral on 27 March 1554. It is probably Guillaume Philandrier, trained in Italy and translator of Vitruvius who completed his education by introducing him to new architectural ideas.

In 1560-1561 he was one of the consuls of Rodez and was described as the "mestre de l'obra de la cathédrale".

In 1561, the bishop of Rodez charged him with the rebuilding of the château de Gages in the Renaissance style to make it his summer residence. He had received it in 1545 as usufruct of Marguerite of Navarre and it was falling into ruins.

He built the western gable of the Rodez Cathedral in 1562, probably according to a plan by Guillaume Philandrier. At the same time he undertook to complete the southeast tower of the cathedral, but was unable to carry out this project.

For the Cardinal of Armagnac, he made repairs at the Saint-Amans church, on the bishopric's terrace, at his castle in Muret.

After the completion of the construction of the cathedral of Rodez, he went to work for the city of Rodez as "master of masonry works". He made repairs on the ramparts, at the Saint-Martial gate.

== Bibliography ==
- Marius Vachon, La Renaissance française. L'architecture nationale. Les grands maîtres maçons, p. 340, Ernest Flammarion publisher, Paris,
- Charles Bauchal, Nouveau dictionnaire biographique et critique des architectes français, p. 523, A. Daly fils et Cie, Paris, 1887 (Read online (vie 543))
