= Sainte-Eulalie-d'Olt =

Commune in Occitanie, France

- Commune
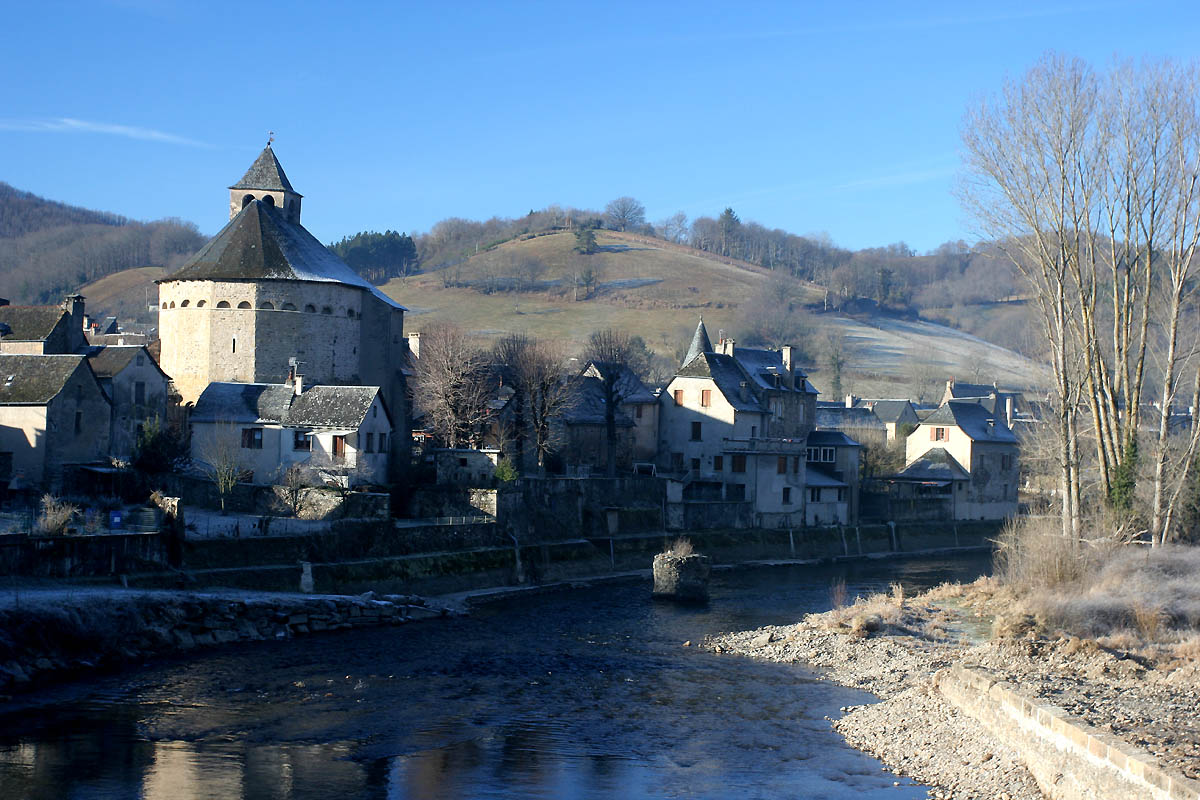
- The Lot river in Sainte-Eulalie-d'Olt
- Location of Sainte-Eulalie-d'Olt
- Location within France Location within Occitanie
- Coordinates: 44°27′55″N 2°56′46″E
- Country: France
- Region: Occitania
- Department: Aveyron
- Arrondissement: Rodez
- Canton: Lot et Palanges

Government
  - Mayor (2020–2026): Christian Naudan
- Area^{1}: 17.48 km^{2} (6.75 sq mi)
- Elevation: 465 m (1,526 ft)
- Highest elevation: 876 m (2,874 ft)
- Lowest elevation: 440 m (1,440 ft)
- Population (2023): 367
  - Density: 21.0/km^{2} (54.4/sq mi)
- Time zone: UTC+01:00 (CET)
  - Summer (DST): UTC+02:00 (CEST)
- INSEE/Postal code: 12219 /12130
- ^{1} French Land Register data, which excludes lakes, ponds, glaciers > 1 km^{2} (0.386 sq mi or 247 acres) and river estuaries.

Sainte-Eulalie-d'Olt (French pronunciation: [sɛ̃t ølali dɔlt], literally Sainte-Eulalie of Olt; Occitan: Senta Aulària d'Òlt; Languedocien: Senta Aulària d'Òlt) is a commune in the department of Aveyron in southern France. It is one of the Les Plus Beaux Villages de France (most beautiful villages of France).

== See also ==
- Communes of the Aveyron department
