= Palmas-d'Aveyron =

Commune in Occitanie, France

- Commune
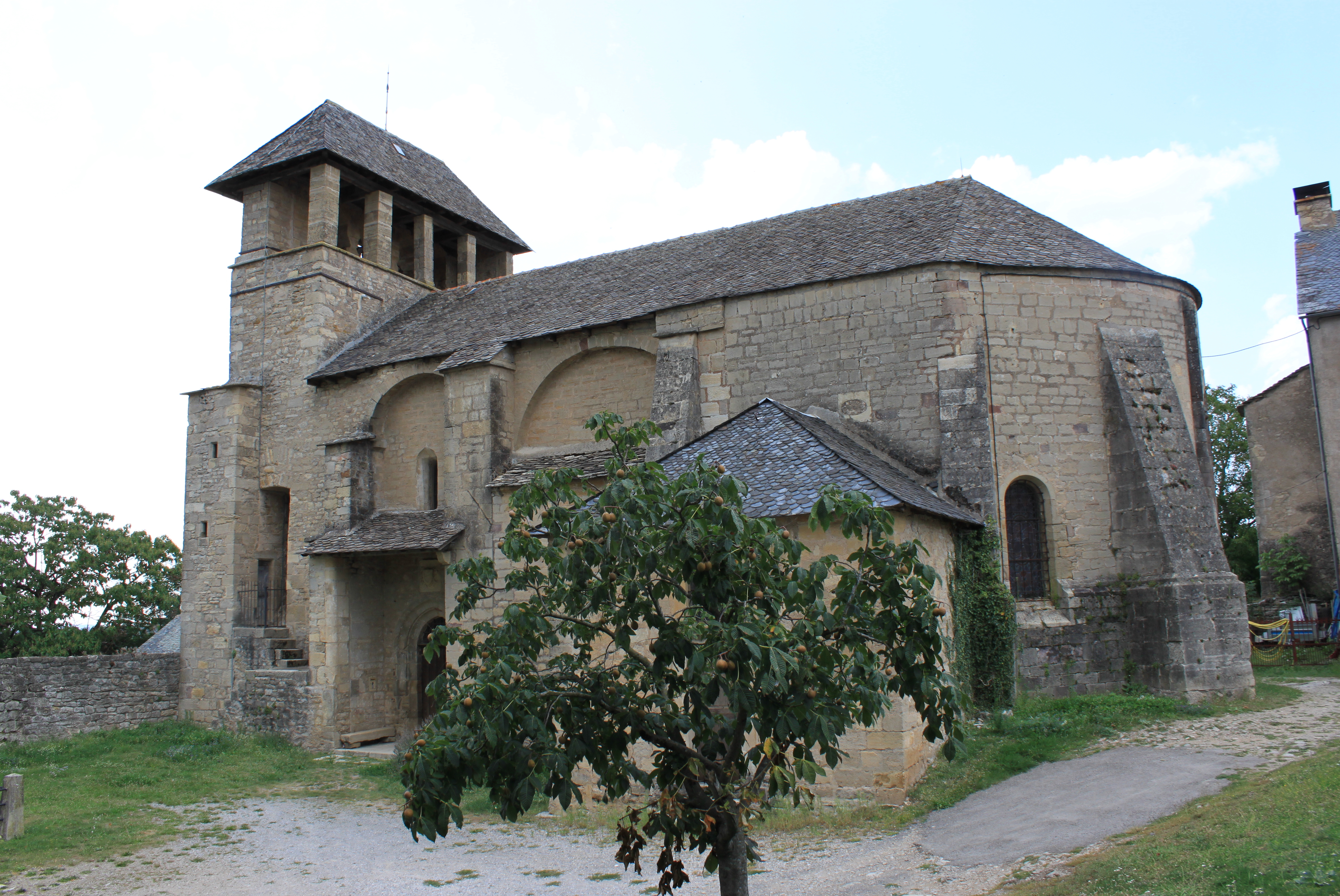
- The church of Palmas
- Location of Palmas-d'Aveyron
- Location within France Location within Occitanie
- Coordinates: 44°23′42″N 2°50′28″E
- Country: France
- Region: Occitania
- Department: Aveyron
- Arrondissement: Rodez
- Canton: Lot et Palanges

Government
  - Mayor (2024–2026): Hélène Constans
- Area^{1}: 43.58 km^{2} (16.83 sq mi)
- Population (2023): 1,026
  - Density: 23.54/km^{2} (60.98/sq mi)
- Time zone: UTC+01:00 (CET)
  - Summer (DST): UTC+02:00 (CEST)
- INSEE/Postal code: 12177 /12310, 12340
- ^{1} French Land Register data, which excludes lakes, ponds, glaciers > 1 km^{2} (0.386 sq mi or 247 acres) and river estuaries.

Palmas-d'Aveyron is a commune in the department of Aveyron, southern France. The municipality was established on 1 January 2016 by merger of the former communes of Palmas, Coussergues and Cruéjouls.

== See also ==
- Communes of the Aveyron department
