= Bertholène =

Commune in Occitanie, France

- Commune
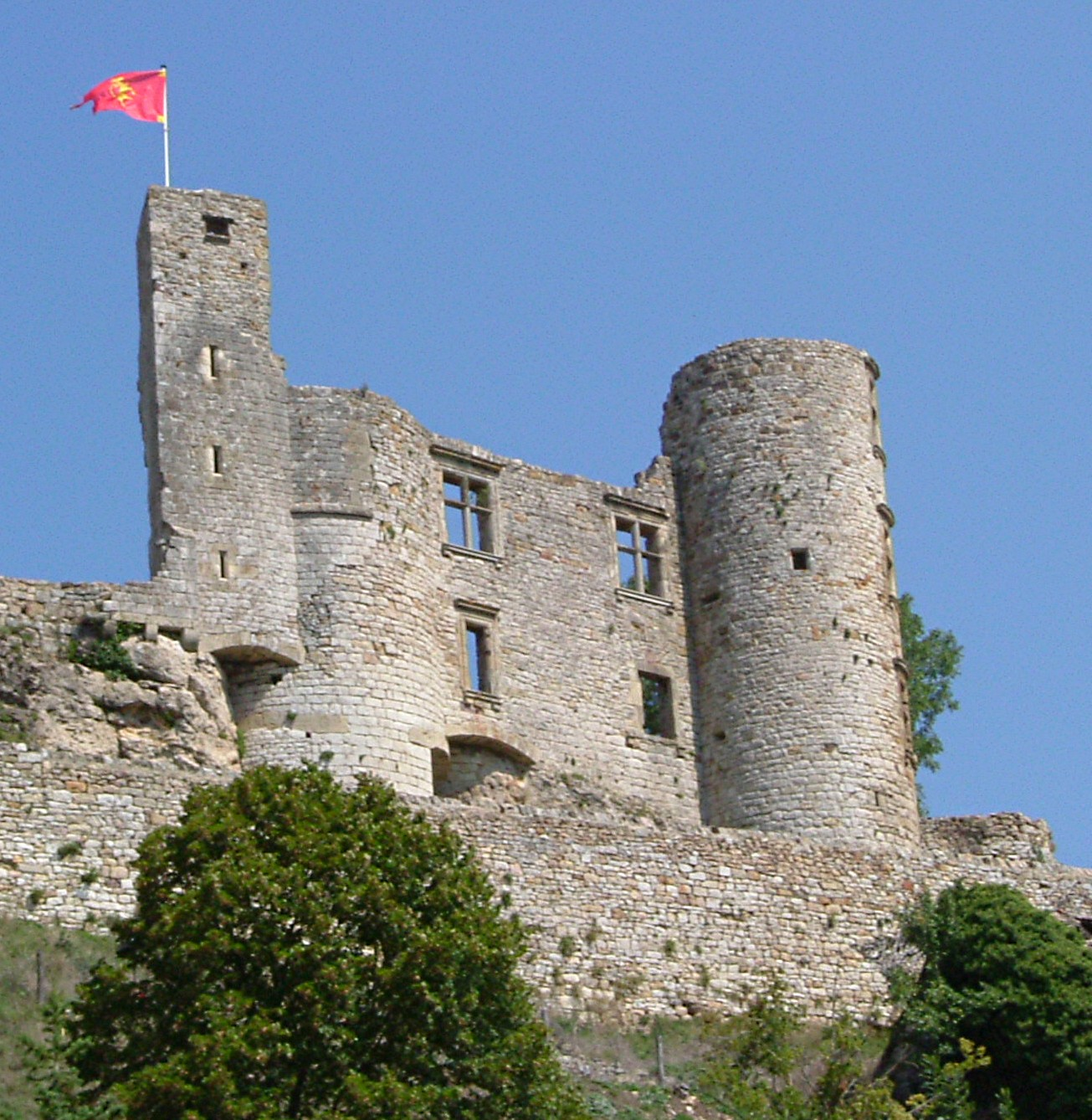
- Château des Bourines

- Coat of arms
- Location of Bertholène
- Location within France Location within Occitanie
- Coordinates: 44°23′44″N 2°46′46″E
- Country: France
- Region: Occitania
- Department: Aveyron
- Arrondissement: Rodez
- Canton: Lot et Palanges

Government
  - Mayor (2020–2026): Christine Presne
- Area^{1}: 46.96 km^{2} (18.13 sq mi)
- Elevation: 592 m (1,942 ft)
- Highest elevation: 926 m (3,038 ft)
- Lowest elevation: 533 m (1,749 ft)
- Population (2023): 1,043
  - Density: 22.21/km^{2} (57.52/sq mi)
- Time zone: UTC+01:00 (CET)
  - Summer (DST): UTC+02:00 (CEST)
- INSEE/Postal code: 12026 /12310
- ^{1} French Land Register data, which excludes lakes, ponds, glaciers > 1 km^{2} (0.386 sq mi or 247 acres) and river estuaries.

Bertholène (French pronunciation: [bɛʁtɔlɛn]; Occitan: Bertolena) is a commune in the Aveyron department in southern France.

== Population ==
Historical population
Year	Pop.	±% p.a.
1968	785	—
1975	705	−1.52%
1982	782	+1.49%
1990	918	+2.02%
1999	924	+0.07%
2007	1,003	+1.03%
2012	1,013	+0.20%
2017	1,046	+0.64%
2023	1,043	−0.05%
Source: INSEE

== See also ==
- Communes of the Aveyron department
