= Gaillac-d'Aveyron =

Commune in Occitanie, France

- Commune
- Location of Gaillac-d'Aveyron
- Location within France Location within Occitanie
- Coordinates: 44°21′23″N 2°55′46″E
- Country: France
- Region: Occitania
- Department: Aveyron
- Arrondissement: Rodez
- Canton: Lot et Palanges
- Intercommunality: CC des Causses à l'Aubrac

Government
  - Mayor (2020–2026): François Lacaze
- Area^{1}: 29.03 km^{2} (11.21 sq mi)
- Elevation: 621 m (2,037 ft)
- Highest elevation: 975 m (3,199 ft)
- Lowest elevation: 584 m (1,916 ft)
- Population (2023): 322
  - Density: 11.1/km^{2} (28.7/sq mi)
- Time zone: UTC+01:00 (CET)
  - Summer (DST): UTC+02:00 (CEST)
- INSEE/Postal code: 12107 /12310
- ^{1} French Land Register data, which excludes lakes, ponds, glaciers > 1 km^{2} (0.386 sq mi or 247 acres) and river estuaries.

Gaillac-d'Aveyron is a commune in the Aveyron department in Occitanie region in southern France.

== Population ==
Historical population
Year	Pop.	±% p.a.
1968	467	—
1975	430	−1.17%
1982	379	−1.79%
1990	342	−1.28%
1999	328	−0.46%
2007	296	−1.27%
2012	324	+1.82%
2017	307	−1.07%
2023	322	+0.80%
Source: INSEE

== See also ==
- Communes of the Aveyron department
