= Cruéjouls =

Part of Palmas-d'Aveyron in Occitanie, France

- Part of Palmas-d'Aveyron
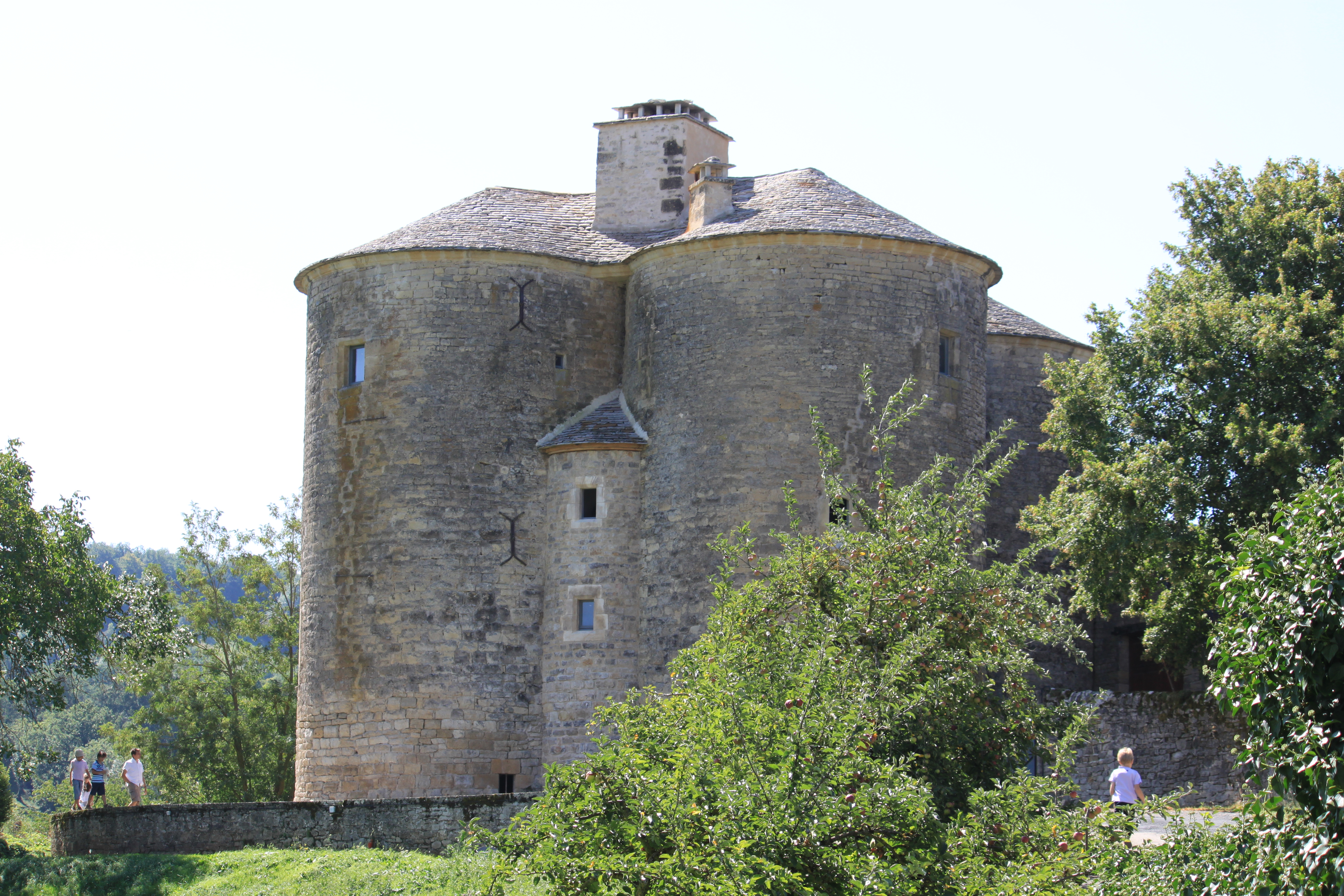
- The Château of Cruéjouls
- Location of Cruéjouls
- Location within France Location within Occitanie
- Coordinates: 44°26′44″N 2°51′21″E
- Country: France
- Region: Occitania
- Department: Aveyron
- Arrondissement: Rodez
- Canton: Lot et Palanges
- Commune: Palmas-d'Aveyron
- Area^{1}: 18.35 km^{2} (7.08 sq mi)
- Elevation: 625 m (2,051 ft)
- Highest elevation: 777 m (2,549 ft)
- Lowest elevation: 557 m (1,827 ft)
- Population (2023): 380
  - Density: 21/km^{2} (54/sq mi)
- Time zone: UTC+01:00 (CET)
  - Summer (DST): UTC+02:00 (CEST)
- Postal code: 12340
- ^{1} French Land Register data, which excludes lakes, ponds, glaciers > 1 km^{2} (0.386 sq mi or 247 acres) and river estuaries.

Cruéjouls (Languedocien: Cruèjols) is a former commune in the Aveyron department in southern France. On 1 January 2016, it was merged into the new commune of Palmas-d'Aveyron.

== See also ==
- Communes of the Aveyron department
