= Castelnau-de-Mandailles =

Commune in Occitanie, France

- Commune
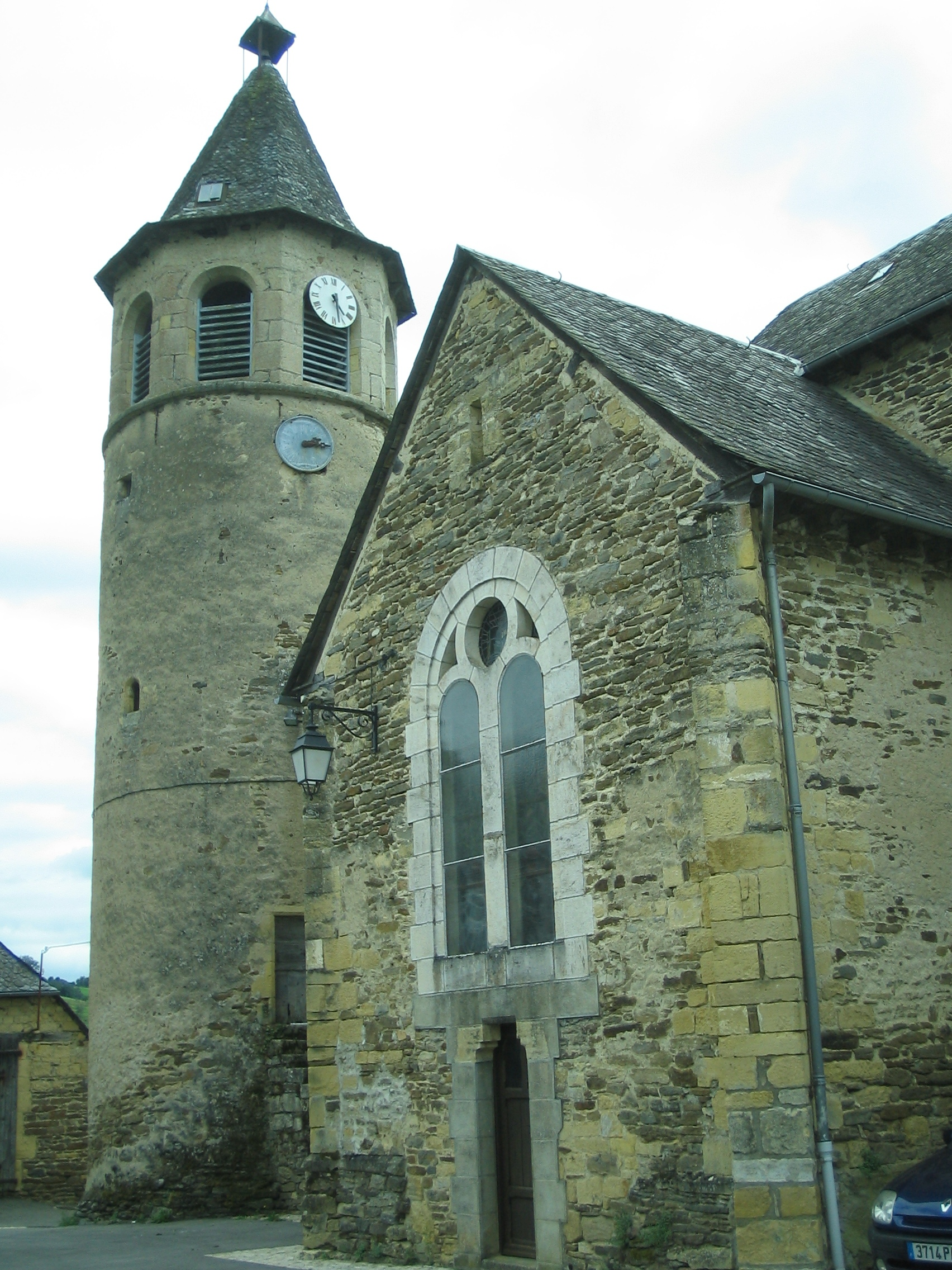
- The church in Castelnau-de-Mandailles

- Coat of arms
- Location of Castelnau-de-Mandailles
- Location within France Location within Occitanie
- Coordinates: 44°32′12″N 2°53′11″E
- Country: France
- Region: Occitania
- Department: Aveyron
- Arrondissement: Rodez
- Canton: Lot et Palanges

Government
  - Mayor (2020–2026): Sandra Sielvy
- Area^{1}: 35.87 km^{2} (13.85 sq mi)
- Elevation: 550 m (1,800 ft)
- Highest elevation: 949 m (3,114 ft)
- Lowest elevation: 360 m (1,180 ft)
- Population (2023): 565
  - Density: 15.8/km^{2} (40.8/sq mi)
- Time zone: UTC+01:00 (CET)
  - Summer (DST): UTC+02:00 (CEST)
- INSEE/Postal code: 12061 /12500
- ^{1} French Land Register data, which excludes lakes, ponds, glaciers > 1 km^{2} (0.386 sq mi or 247 acres) and river estuaries.

Castelnau-de-Mandailles (French pronunciation: [kastɛlno də mɑ̃daj]; Occitan: Castèlnau de Mandalhas) is a commune in the Aveyron department in southern France.

== Population ==
Historical population
Year	Pop.	±% p.a.
1968	612	—
1975	545	−1.64%
1982	527	−0.48%
1990	521	−0.14%
1999	528	+0.15%
2007	548	+0.47%
2012	541	−0.26%
2017	586	+1.61%
2023	565	−0.61%
Source: INSEE

== See also ==
- Communes of the Aveyron department
