= Saint-Geniez-d'Olt-et-d'Aubrac =

Commune in Occitanie, France

- Commune
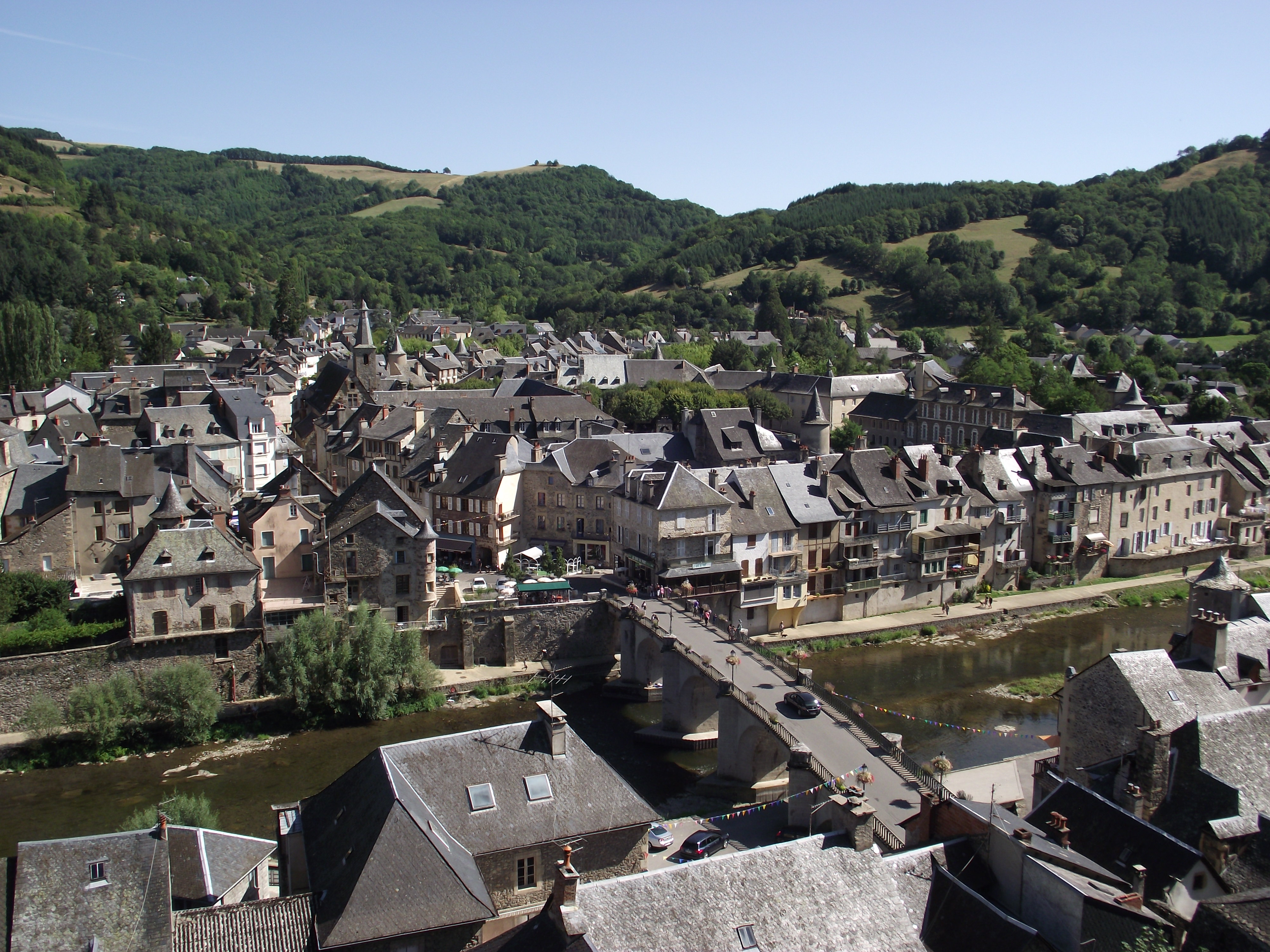
- A view of Saint-Geniez-d'Olt
- Location of Saint-Geniez-d'Olt-et-d'Aubrac
- Location within France Location within Occitanie
- Coordinates: 44°27′58″N 2°58′23″E
- Country: France
- Region: Occitania
- Department: Aveyron
- Arrondissement: Rodez
- Canton: Lot et Palanges
- Area^{1}: 90.17 km^{2} (34.81 sq mi)
- Population (2023): 2,142
  - Density: 23.76/km^{2} (61.53/sq mi)
- Time zone: UTC+01:00 (CET)
  - Summer (DST): UTC+02:00 (CEST)
- INSEE/Postal code: 12224 /12130
- ^{1} French Land Register data, which excludes lakes, ponds, glaciers > 1 km^{2} (0.386 sq mi or 247 acres) and river estuaries.

Saint-Geniez-d'Olt-et-d'Aubrac is a commune in the department of Aveyron, southern France. The municipality was established on 1 January 2016 by merger of the former communes of Saint-Geniez-d'Olt and Aurelle-Verlac.

== Population ==
Population data refer to the commune in its geography as of January 2025.

Historical population
| Year | Pop. | ±% p.a. |
|---|---|---|
| 1968 | 2,663 | — |
| 1975 | 2,502 | −0.89% |
| 1982 | 2,362 | −0.82% |
| 1990 | 2,234 | −0.69% |
| 1999 | 2,050 | −0.95% |
| 2007 | 2,196 | +0.86% |
| 2012 | 2,147 | −0.45% |
| 2017 | 2,196 | +0.45% |
| 2023 | 2,142 | −0.41% |
Source: INSEE

== See also ==
- Communes of the Aveyron department
