= Jardin botanique d'Aubrac =

Botanical garden in Midi-Pyrénées, France

Coordinates: 44°35′29″N 2°55′19″E

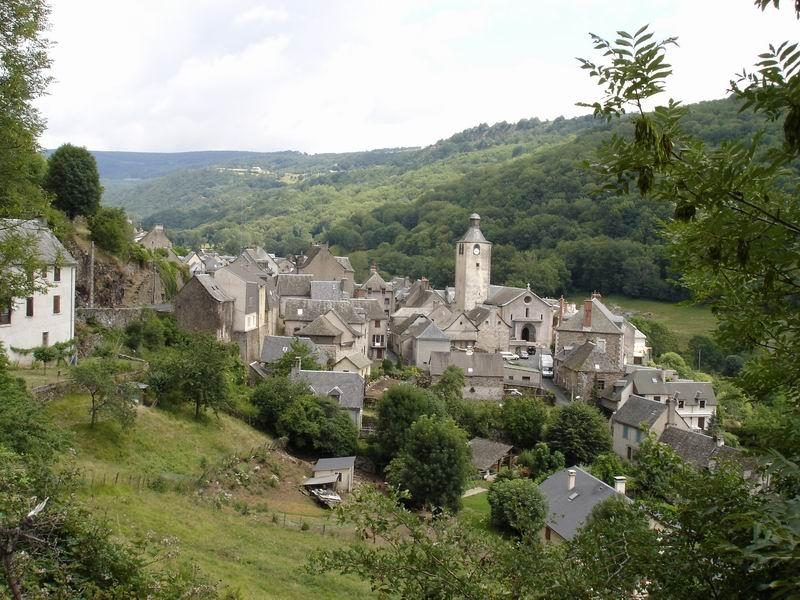

The Jardin botanique d'Aubrac (300 m²) is a small botanical garden located in Saint-Chély-d'Aubrac, Aveyron, Midi-Pyrénées, France. It is open on weekends without charge.

The garden was established in 1995 within the Domerie d'Aubrac, a former monastery hospital. It now contains more than 500 plants arranged in flowerbeds representing bog, forest, pasture, and rock garden environments. Each plant is labeled with its common and scientific names.

== See also ==
- List of botanical gardens in France
