= Vimenet =

Commune in Occitanie, France

- Commune
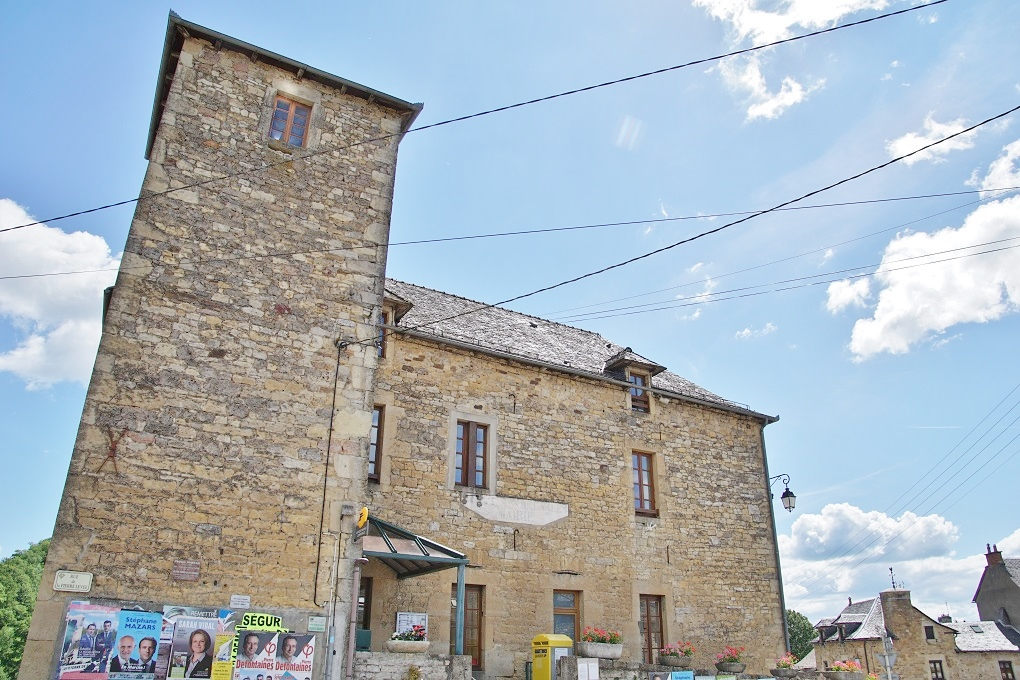
- Town hall
- Location of Vimenet
- Location within France Location within Occitanie
- Coordinates: 44°24′03″N 2°55′38″E
- Country: France
- Region: Occitania
- Department: Aveyron
- Arrondissement: Rodez
- Canton: Lot et Palanges
- Intercommunality: CC des Causses à l'Aubrac

Government
  - Mayor (2020–2026): Laurent Agator
- Area^{1}: 20.95 km^{2} (8.09 sq mi)
- Elevation: 640 m (2,100 ft)
- Highest elevation: 844 m (2,769 ft)
- Lowest elevation: 586 m (1,923 ft)
- Population (2023): 248
  - Density: 11.8/km^{2} (30.7/sq mi)
- Time zone: UTC+01:00 (CET)
  - Summer (DST): UTC+02:00 (CEST)
- INSEE/Postal code: 12303 /12310
- ^{1} French Land Register data, which excludes lakes, ponds, glaciers > 1 km^{2} (0.386 sq mi or 247 acres) and river estuaries.

Vimenet (Occitan: Vimenet) is a commune in the Aveyron department in southern France.

== Population ==
Historical population
Year	Pop.	±% p.a.
1968	343	—
1975	275	−3.11%
1982	263	−0.64%
1990	243	−0.98%
1999	233	−0.47%
2007	252	+0.98%
2012	257	+0.39%
2017	244	−1.03%
2023	248	+0.27%
Source: INSEE

== See also ==
- Communes of the Aveyron department
