= Prades-d'Aubrac =

Commune in Occitanie, France

- Commune
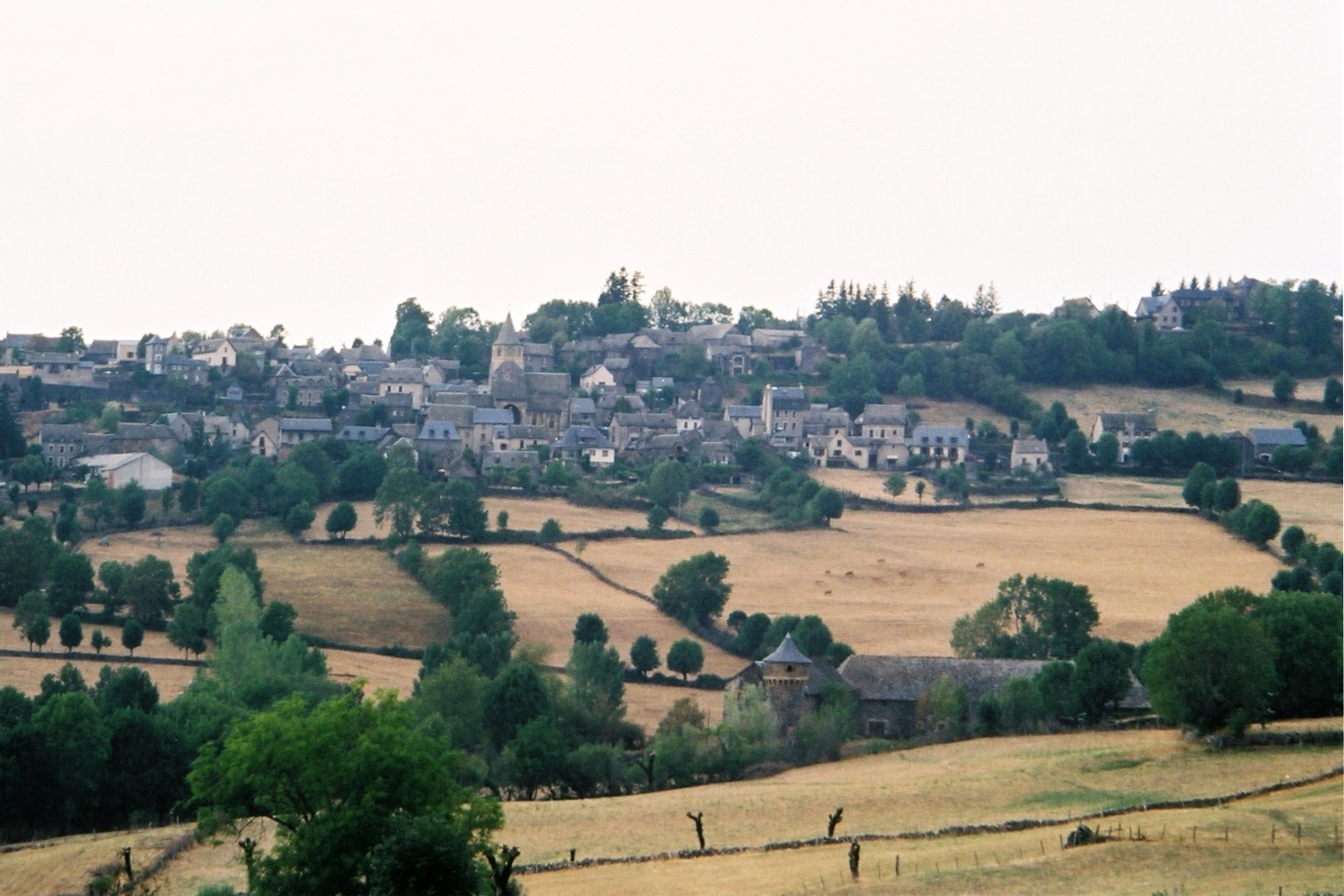
- A general view of Prades-d'Aubrac

- Coat of arms
- Location of Prades-d'Aubrac
- Location within France Location within Occitanie
- Coordinates: 44°32′04″N 2°56′21″E
- Country: France
- Region: Occitania
- Department: Aveyron
- Arrondissement: Rodez
- Canton: Lot et Palanges

Government
  - Mayor (2020–2026): Roger Auguy
- Area^{1}: 46.64 km^{2} (18.01 sq mi)
- Elevation: 888 m (2,913 ft)
- Highest elevation: 1,385 m (4,544 ft)
- Lowest elevation: 405 m (1,329 ft)
- Population (2023): 278
  - Density: 5.96/km^{2} (15.4/sq mi)
- Time zone: UTC+01:00 (CET)
  - Summer (DST): UTC+02:00 (CEST)
- INSEE/Postal code: 12187 /12470
- ^{1} French Land Register data, which excludes lakes, ponds, glaciers > 1 km^{2} (0.386 sq mi or 247 acres) and river estuaries.

Prades-d'Aubrac (French pronunciation: [pʁad dobʁak]; Occitan: Pradas d'Aubrac) is a commune in the southern French department of Aveyron.

== Population ==
Historical population
Year	Pop.	±% p.a.
1968	692	—
1975	557	−3.05%
1982	511	−1.22%
1990	438	−1.91%
1999	402	−0.95%
2007	417	+0.46%
2012	421	+0.19%
2017	378	−2.13%
2023	278	−4.99%
Source: INSEE

== See also ==
- Communes of the Aveyron department
