= Saint-Geniez-d'Olt =

Commune in Aveyron, France

- Part of Saint-Geniez-d'Olt-et-d'Aubrac
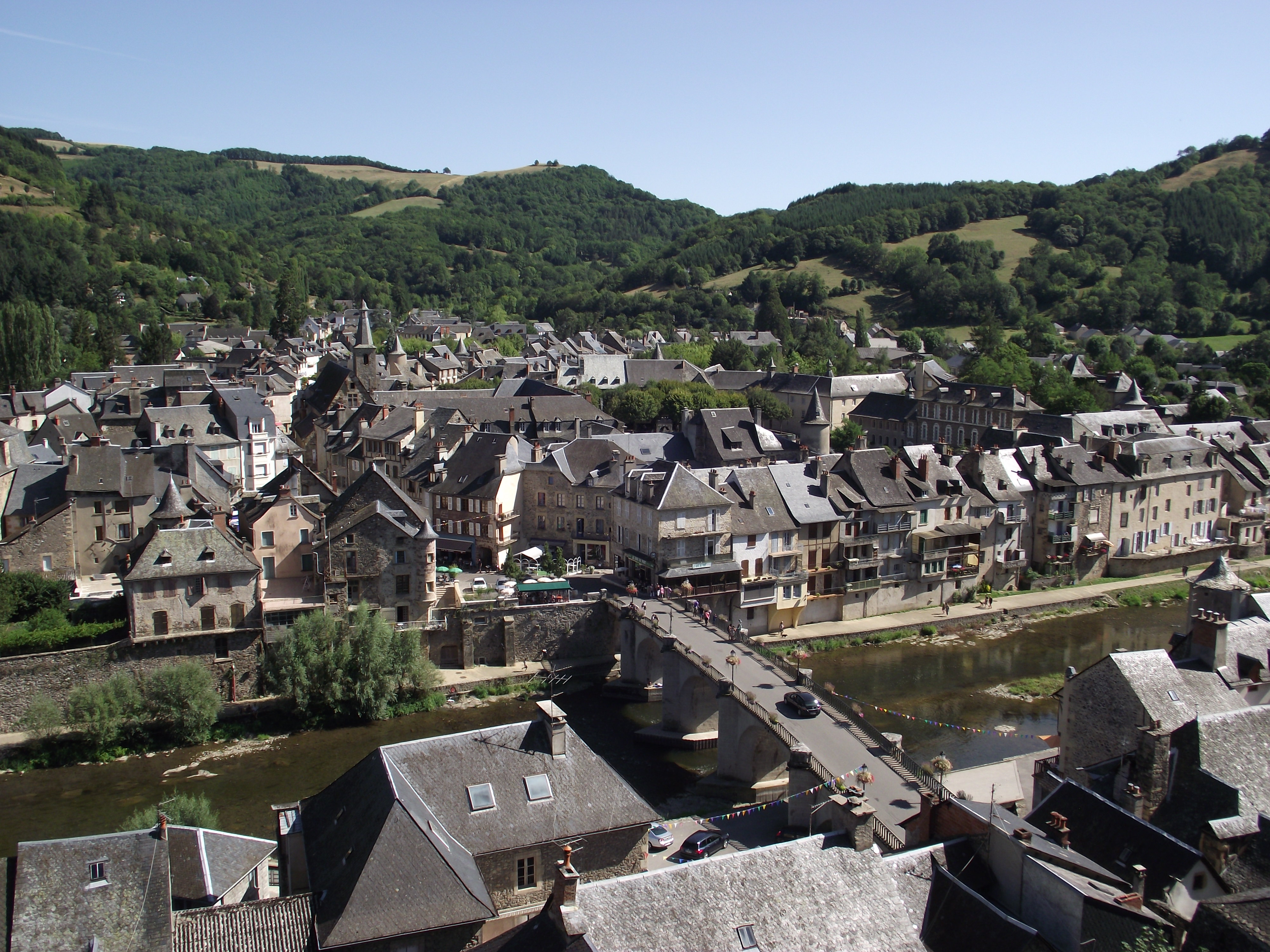
- Lot (river)

- Coat of arms
- Location of Saint-Geniez-d'Olt
- Location within France Location within Occitanie
- Coordinates: 44°27′57″N 2°58′28″E
- Country: France
- Region: Occitania
- Department: Aveyron
- Arrondissement: Rodez
- Canton: Lot et Palanges
- Commune: Saint-Geniez-d'Olt-et-d'Aubrac
- Area^{1}: 35.49 km^{2} (13.70 sq mi)
- Elevation: 420 m (1,380 ft)
- Highest elevation: 985 m (3,232 ft)
- Lowest elevation: 403 m (1,322 ft)
- Population (2021): 2,057
  - Density: 57.96/km^{2} (150.1/sq mi)
- Time zone: UTC+01:00 (CET)
  - Summer (DST): UTC+02:00 (CEST)
- Postal code: 12130
- ^{1} French Land Register data, which excludes lakes, ponds, glaciers > 1 km^{2} (0.386 sq mi or 247 acres) and river estuaries.

Saint-Geniez-d'Olt (French pronunciation: [sɛ̃ ʒənje dɔlt], literally Saint Geniez of Olt; Occitan: Sent Ginièis d'Òlt) is a former commune in the Aveyron department in southern France. On 1 January 2016, it was merged into the new commune of Saint-Geniez-d'Olt-et-d'Aubrac. The theologian and encyclopédiste Jean Pestré (1723–1821) was born in the village.

== Population ==
Historical population
Year	Pop.	±% p.a.
1962	2,183	—
1968	2,283	+0.75%
1975	2,169	−0.73%
1982	2,092	−0.52%
1990	1,988	−0.64%
1999	1,841	−0.85%
2021	2,057	+0.51%
Source: EHESS and INSEE

Its inhabitants are called Marmots in French.

== See also ==
- Communes of the Aveyron department
- List of medieval bridges in France
