= Saint-Chély-d'Aubrac =

Commune in Occitanie, France

- Commune
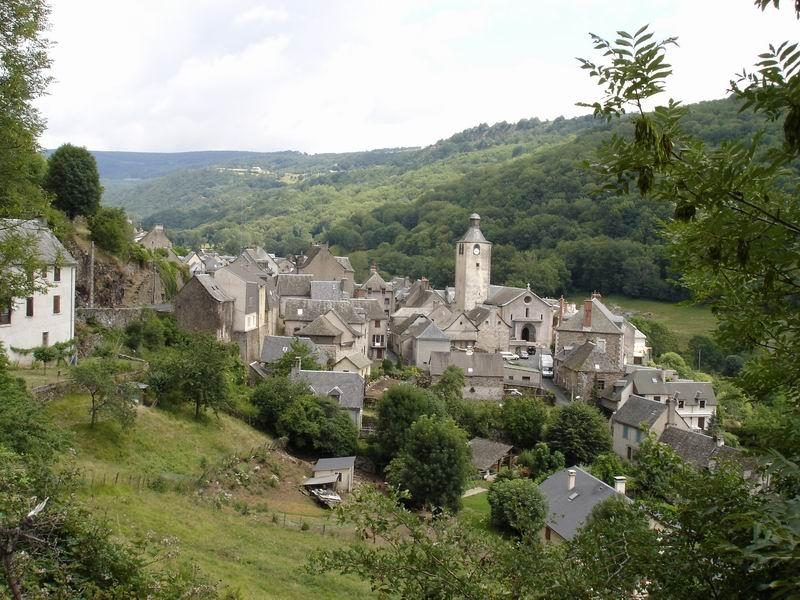
- A general view of Saint-Chély-d'Aubrac

- Coat of arms
- Location of Saint-Chély-d'Aubrac
- Location within France Location within Occitanie
- Coordinates: 44°35′29″N 2°55′19″E
- Country: France
- Region: Occitania
- Department: Aveyron
- Arrondissement: Rodez
- Canton: Aubrac et Carladez

Government
  - Mayor (2020–2026): Christiane Marfin
- Area^{1}: 78.65 km^{2} (30.37 sq mi)
- Highest elevation: 1,405 m (4,610 ft)
- Lowest elevation: 560 m (1,840 ft)
- Population (2023): 517
  - Density: 6.57/km^{2} (17.0/sq mi)
- Time zone: UTC+01:00 (CET)
  - Summer (DST): UTC+02:00 (CEST)
- INSEE/Postal code: 12214 /12470
- ^{1} French Land Register data, which excludes lakes, ponds, glaciers > 1 km^{2} (0.386 sq mi or 247 acres) and river estuaries.

Saint-Chély-d'Aubrac (French pronunciation: [sɛ̃ ʃeli dobʁak]; Languedocien: Sanch Èli d'Aubrac or Sench Eli d'Aubrac) is a commune in the Aveyron department in southern France about 7 kilometres from Aubrac.

== Population ==
Historical population
Year	Pop.	±% p.a.
1968	726	—
1975	606	−2.55%
1982	556	−1.22%
1990	547	−0.20%
1999	532	−0.31%
2007	547	+0.35%
2012	543	−0.15%
2017	529	−0.52%
2023	517	−0.38%
Source: INSEE

== Location ==
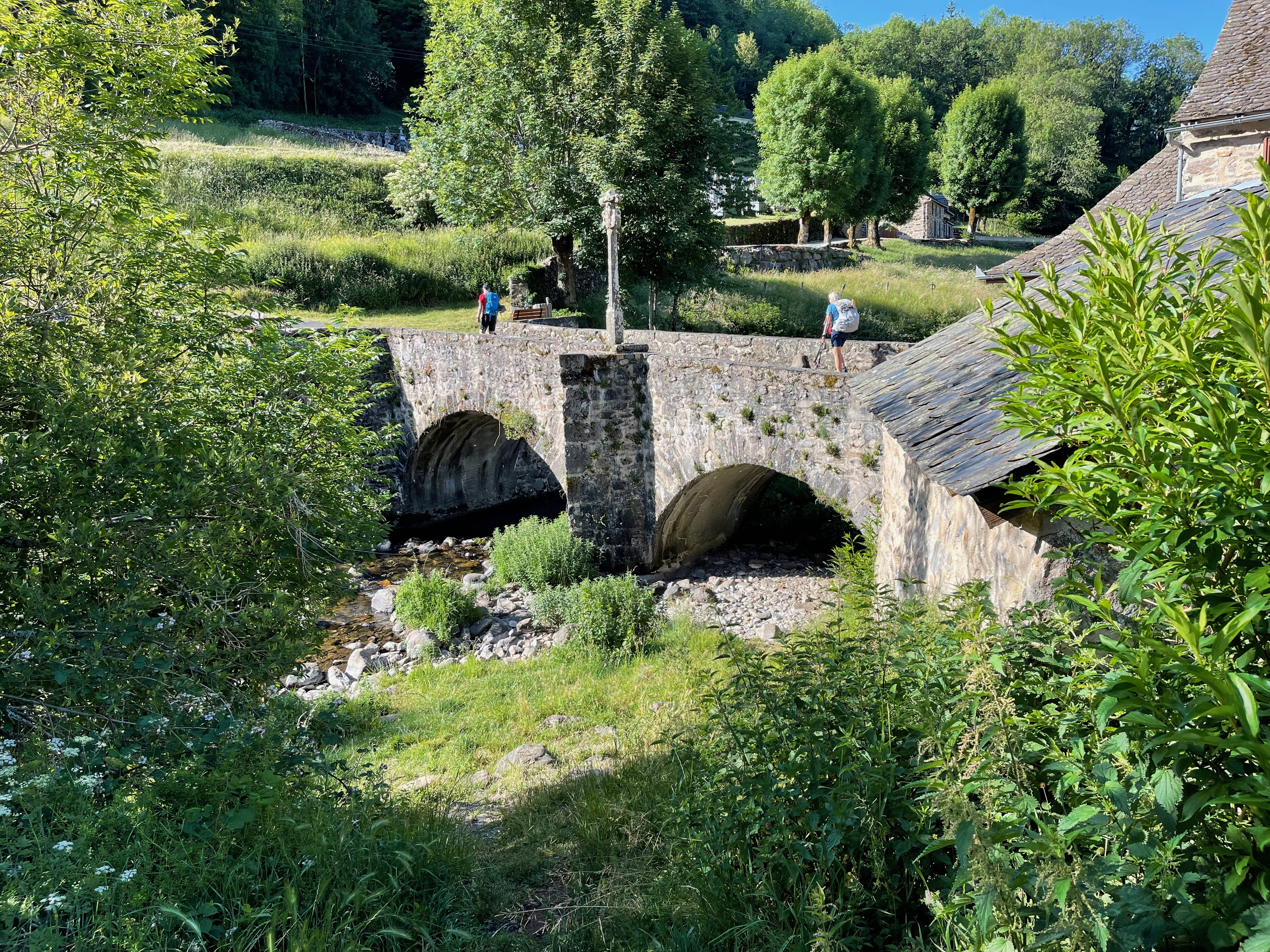
Pilgrim Bridge in Saint-Chély-d’Aubrac as listed by UNESCO as part of the Routes of Santiago de Compostela in France.

Saint-Chély-d'Aubrac is situated in a wooded valley along the GR 65, a section of Way of Saint James pilgrim route. It is the next town on the route after Aubrac when travelling in the direction of Saint-Chély-d'Aubrac.. The town lies in a clearing in the valley and is entered via an old bridge bearing a pilgrim's cross.

The town of Saint-Chély-d'Aubrac is recognized by UNESCO as part of the Routes of Santiago de Compostela in France. The Bridge of the Pilgrims is specifically named as part of this designation.

== Landscape ==
The town has been a member of the Natura 2000 network since August 2006. It hosts an annual chess festival.

== Sights ==
- Jardin botanique d'Aubrac

== Gallery ==
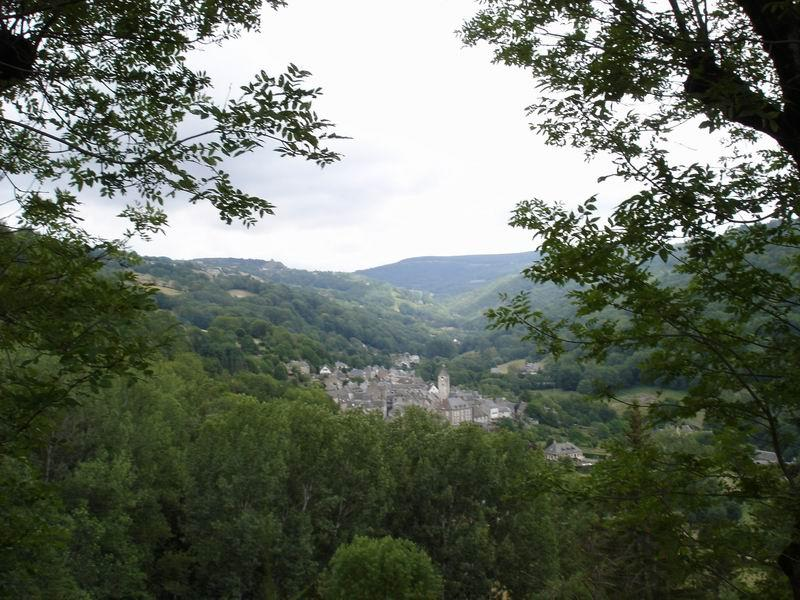
Saint-Chély: landscape

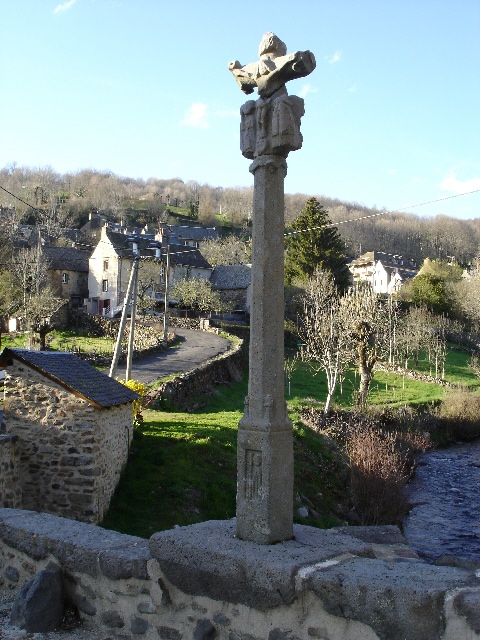
Pilgrim's Cross

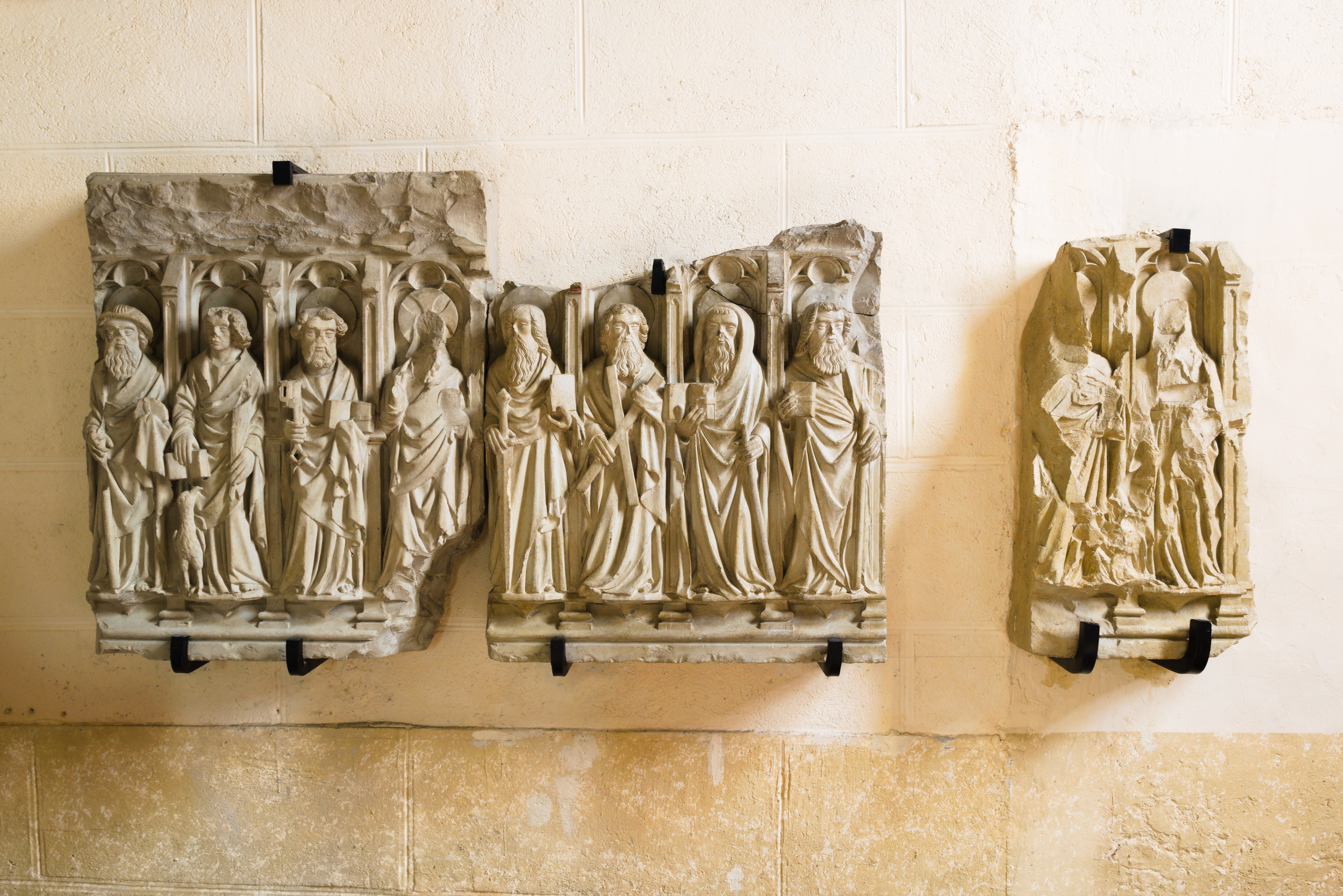
Medieval stone low reliefs

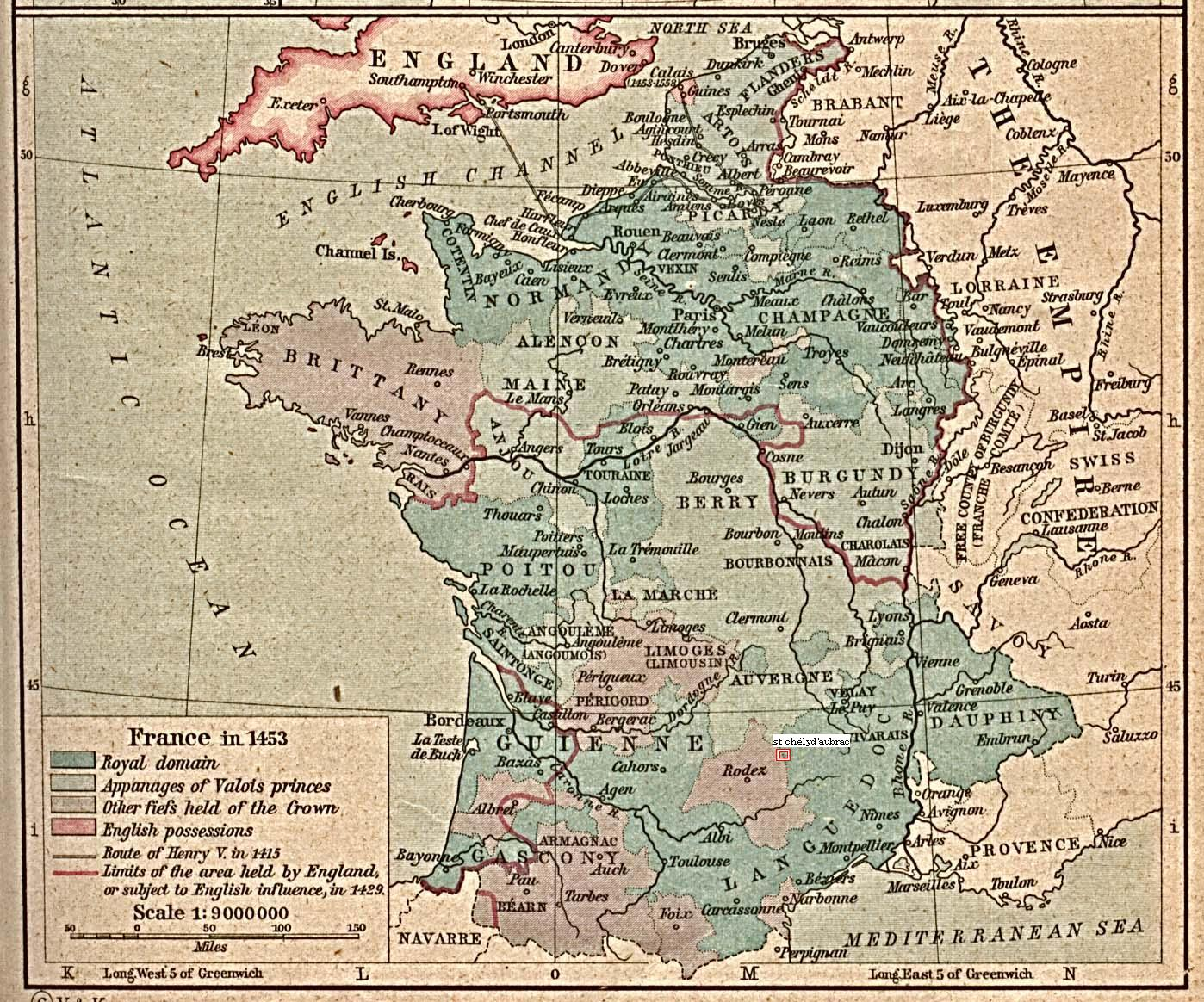
English possessions XVth

== See also ==
- Communes of the Aveyron department
