= Pierrefiche, Aveyron =

Commune in Occitanie, France

Pierrefiche
- Commune
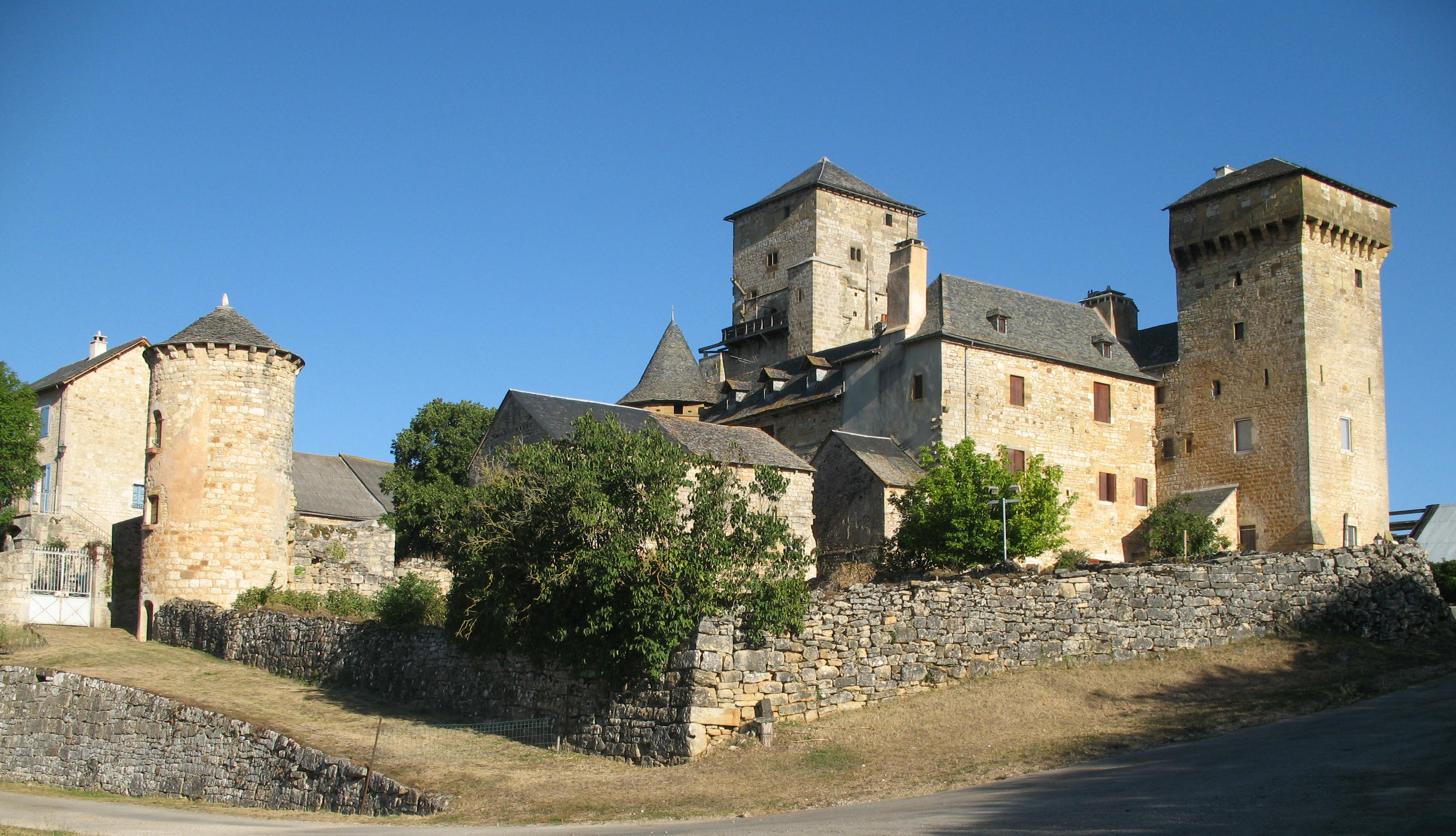
- The Château of Galinières
- Location of Pierrefiche
- Location within France Location within Occitanie
- Coordinates: 44°26′40″N 2°56′56″E
- Country: France
- Region: Occitania
- Department: Aveyron
- Arrondissement: Rodez
- Canton: Lot et Palanges

Government
  - Mayor (2020–2026): Raphaël Bach
- Area^{1}: 17.1 km^{2} (6.6 sq mi)
- Elevation: 560 m (1,840 ft)
- Highest elevation: 787 m (2,582 ft)
- Lowest elevation: 423 m (1,388 ft)
- Population (2023): 303
  - Density: 17.7/km^{2} (45.9/sq mi)
- Time zone: UTC+01:00 (CET)
  - Summer (DST): UTC+02:00 (CEST)
- INSEE/Postal code: 12182 /12130
- ^{1} French Land Register data, which excludes lakes, ponds, glaciers > 1 km^{2} (0.386 sq mi or 247 acres) and river estuaries.

Pierrefiche (French pronunciation: [pjɛʁfiʃ]; Occitan: Pèiraficha d'Òlt) is a commune in the Aveyron department in southern France.

== Population ==
Historical population
Year	Pop.	±% p.a.
1968	205	—
1975	203	−0.14%
1982	199	−0.28%
1990	238	+2.26%
1999	273	+1.54%
2007	263	−0.47%
2012	270	+0.53%
2017	274	+0.29%
2023	303	+1.69%
Source: INSEE

== See also ==
- Communes of the Aveyron department
