= Ayssènes =

Commune in Occitanie, France

- Commune
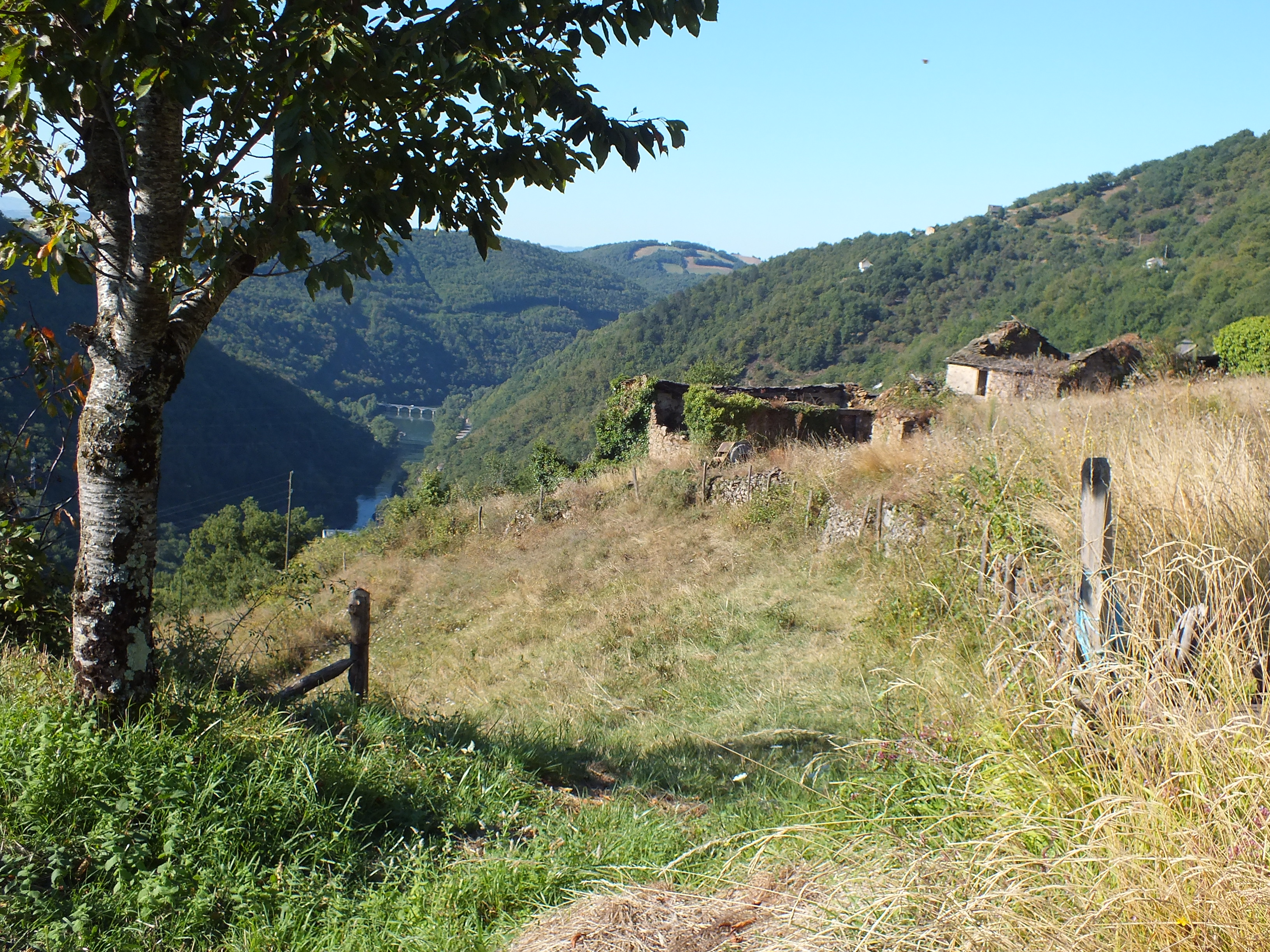
- The hamlet of Le Pouget

- Coat of arms
- Location of Ayssènes
- Location within France Location within Occitanie
- Coordinates: 44°04′13″N 2°46′49″E
- Country: France
- Region: Occitania
- Department: Aveyron
- Arrondissement: Millau
- Canton: Raspes et Lévezou
- Intercommunality: CC Muse Raspes Tarn

Government
  - Mayor (2020–2026): Marie-Chantal Calmes-Bou
- Area^{1}: 23.14 km^{2} (8.93 sq mi)
- Elevation: 356 m (1,168 ft)
- Highest elevation: 983 m (3,225 ft)
- Lowest elevation: 262 m (860 ft)
- Population (2023): 225
  - Density: 9.72/km^{2} (25.2/sq mi)
- Time zone: UTC+01:00 (CET)
  - Summer (DST): UTC+02:00 (CEST)
- INSEE/Postal code: 12017 /12430
- ^{1} French Land Register data, which excludes lakes, ponds, glaciers > 1 km^{2} (0.386 sq mi or 247 acres) and river estuaries.

Ayssènes (French pronunciation: [ɛsɛn]; Occitan: Aissenas) is a commune in the Aveyron department in the Occitanie region of southern France.

== Geography ==
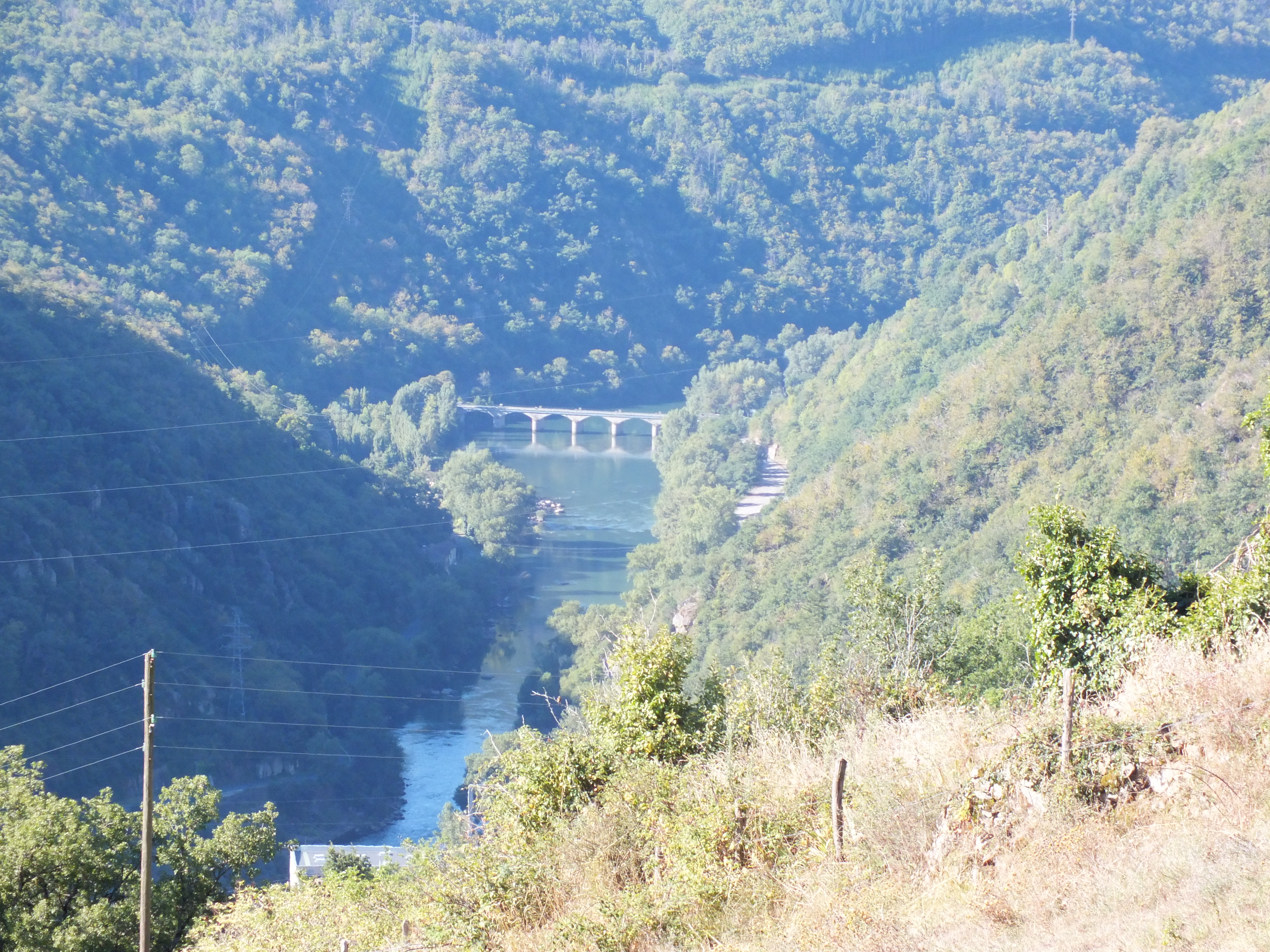
The river below Le Pouget

Ayssènes is located some 25 km west of Millau and 7 km south-east of Alrance. Access to the commune is by the D510 road from Villefranche-de-Panat in the west which passes through the commune by a circuitous route to the village then continues south across the river to join the D200 on the opposite bank. Apart from the village there are the hamlets of:

- Ardennes
- Le Bastizou
- Cabière
- Calmels
- Le Caussanal
- La Caze
- La Clerguie
- Coupiaguet
- Le Crouzet
- Les Esclots
- Lescure
- Melet
- Le Pouget
- Rentières
- Saint-Rémy
- Vabrette
- Valergues
- Verdalle
- Vernet

The commune is mainly forest with large areas of farmland.

The southern border of the commune is formed by the Tarn river which is dammed just south-west of the commune to form a long lake along the southern border. From the dam the Tarn continues south-west to eventually join the Garonne just west of Moissac. The Ruisseau de Vernobre rises in the north of the commune and flows south, gathering many tributaries, to join the Tarn. The Ruisseau de Coudols flows from the north-east, gathering some tributaries in the commune, and joins the Tarn at the same point as the Ruisseau de Vernobre.

== History ==
=== Middle Ages ===
The village was built on a ridge overlooking the Tarn and was a direct link between the Lévézou Plateau and Raspes du Tarn. There was once a fortress on the peak of Roc Saint-Jean. It belonged to the Count of Rodez who maintained a garrison in order to maintain his influence over the southern Rouergue. Prestigious guests stayed at this location including the King of France, Charles VII, on 13 May 1437 while returning from Languedoc where he had been to restore order.

=== Modern Era ===
The castle was the subject of much covetousness during the wars of religion. In October 1586 the army of the Duke of Joyeuse, Anne de Joyeuse - brother of King Henry III, tried to besiege it. The Captain of the garrison made a ploy and the duke's army retreated towards the plateau of Saint-Victor which was where the garrison captain attacked the camp at night - taking fifty horses and capturing several soldiers. The fortress became dangerous for the kingdom and was destroyed in 1629 by order of Cardinal Richelieu. Today nothing remains but the location has one of the most beautiful views in the region.

=== Contemporary era ===
The commune consisted of four parishes in the second half of the 19th century with a population of around 1500. Today there are no more than 213 year-round residents.

=== Heraldry ===
Arms of Ayssènes	Blazon: Party per pale, first Gules, a lion Or tongued and armed in Sable; second Azure, a tower Argent embattled of 4 pieces, ensigned with a Latin crosslet the same, port open, masoned in Sable, debruised by two swords Argent hilt and pommel Gules saltirewise; in base three fesses Argent wavy.

== Administration ==
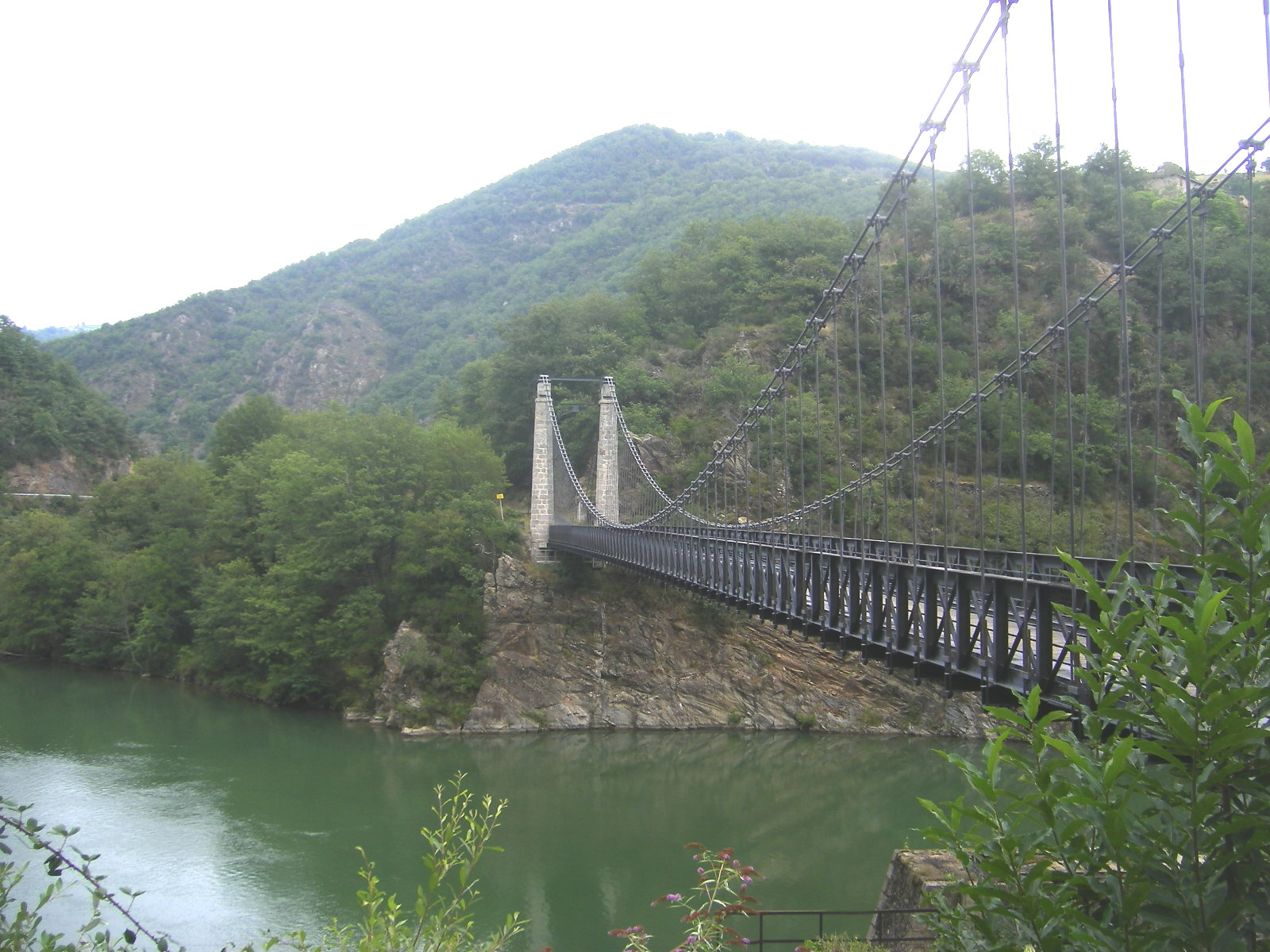
The bridge over the Tarn

List of Successive Mayors

From	To	Name
1875	1888	Galtier Calmeyrac
1888	1889	Basile Bonnefous
1889	1892	Félix Galtier
1892	1904	Paulin Brengues
1904	1910	Justin Fabre
1910	1912	Camille Bou
1912	1914	Edouard Cambefort
1914	1919	Benoît Costes
1919	1953	Edouard Cambefort
1953	1995	René Arles
1995	2026	Marie-Chantal Calmes-Bou

== Demography ==
The inhabitants of the commune are known as Ayssenols or Ayssenoles in French.

Historical population

Year	Pop.	±% p.a.
1800	591	—
1876	1,219	+0.96%
1881	1,149	−1.18%
1886	1,130	−0.33%
1891	1,125	−0.09%
1896	1,038	−1.60%
1901	1,014	−0.47%
1906	956	−1.17%
1911	963	+0.15%
1921	828	−1.50%
1926	770	−1.44%
1931	739	−0.82%
1936	740	+0.03%

Year	Pop.	±% p.a.
1946	663	−1.09%
1954	568	−1.91%
1962	466	−2.44%
1968	431	−1.29%
1975	343	−3.21%
1982	309	−1.48%
1990	248	−2.71%
1999	226	−1.03%
2007	218	−0.45%
2012	212	−0.56%
2017	216	+0.37%
2023	225	+0.68%

Source: EHESS and INSEE

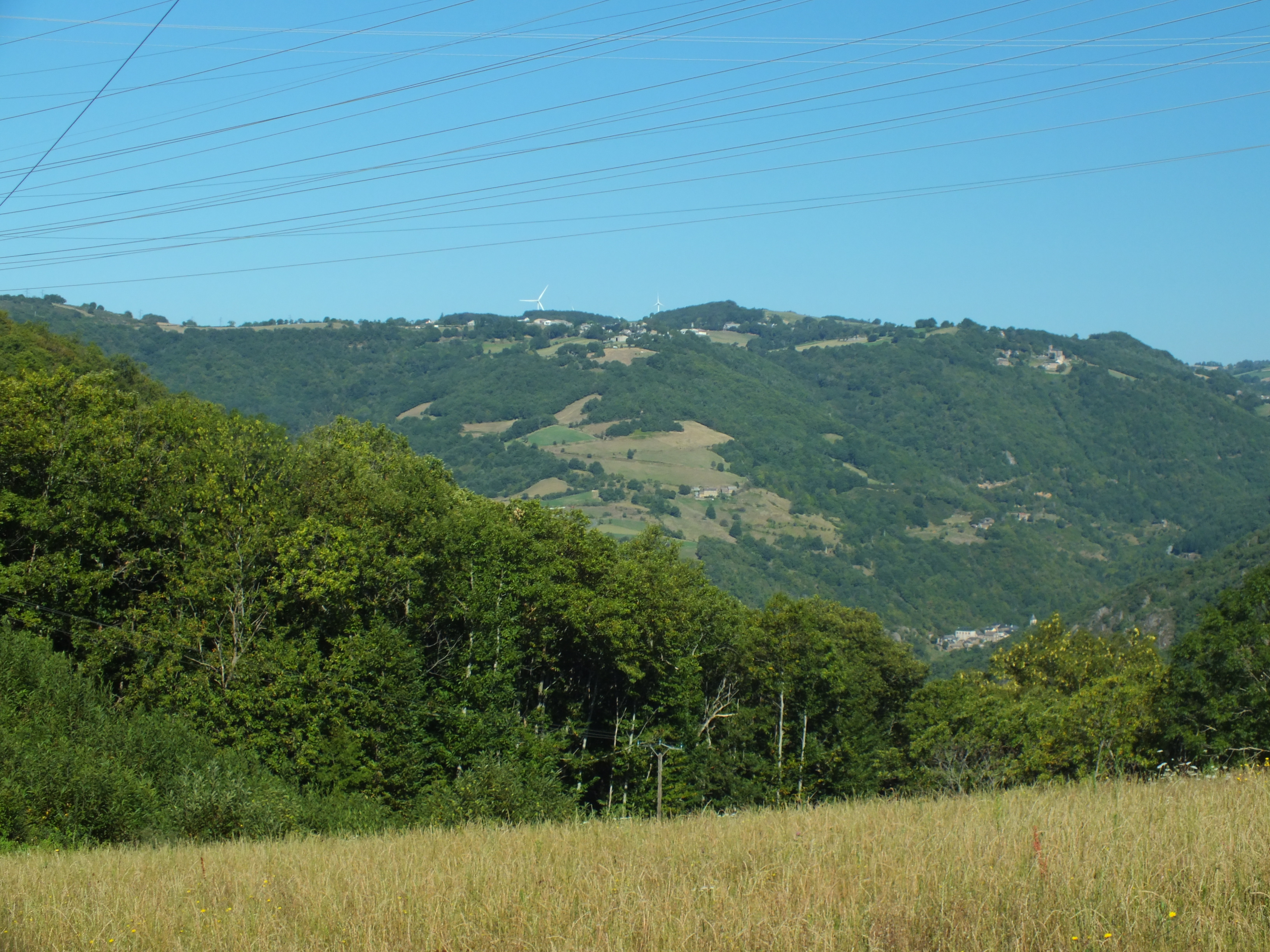
Saint Victor-et-Melvieu and Costecalde

== Sites and monuments ==
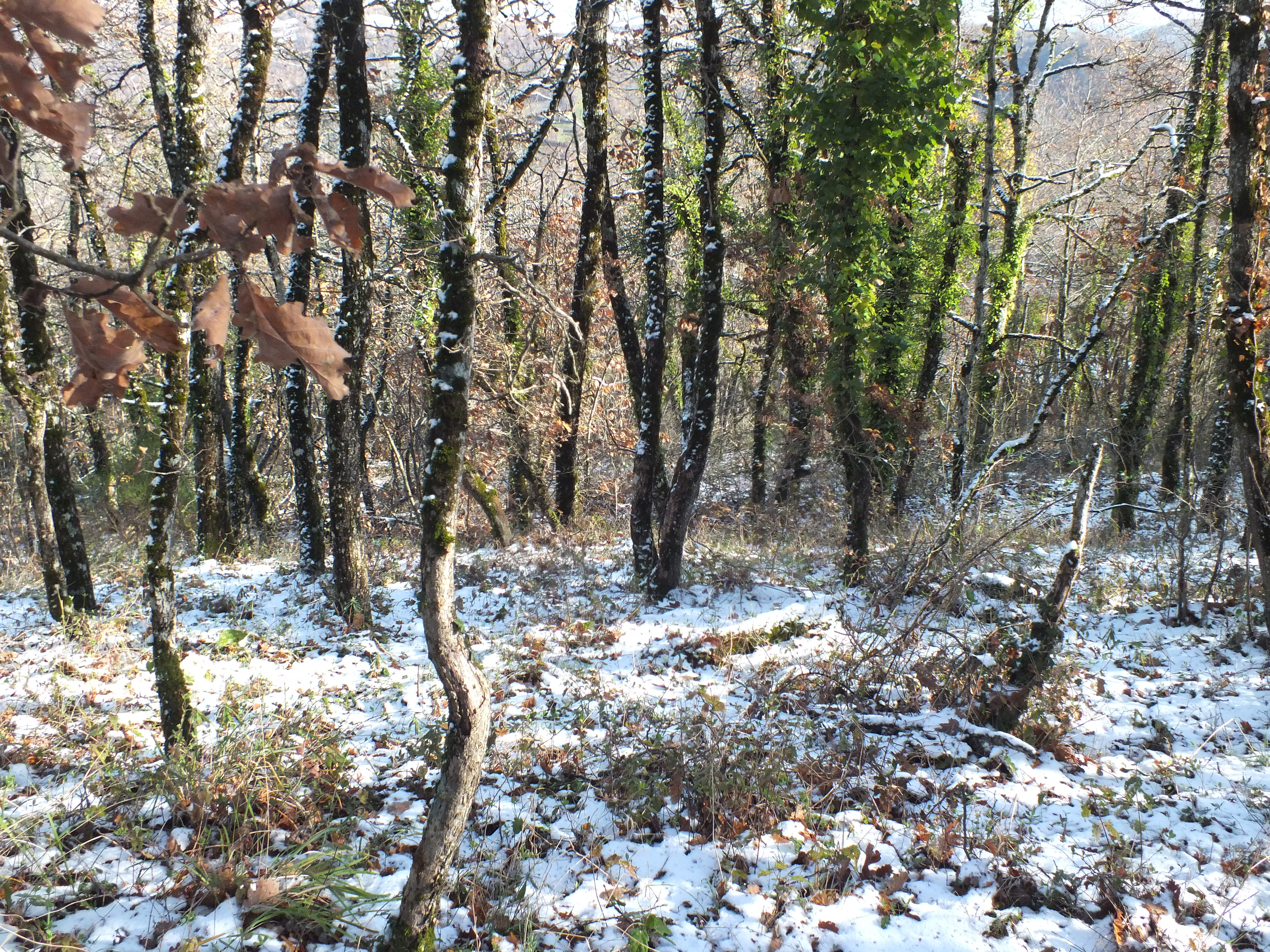
The oak and sweet chestnut woodland near Costecalde (Le Truel)

- The Old Ayssènes Cemetery (graves from the early 19th century).
- The Roc Saint-Jean (The castle disappeared after Richelieu ordered its destruction)
- The Roc du Cavalier
- The Church of the Nativity of Mary (Ayssènes) (19th century)
- The Church of Saint-Amans (at Coupiaguet) (19th century)
- The Church of Saint Rémy (at Saint-Rémy) (19th century)
- The Church of Saint-Blaise or of the Purification of Notre-Dame (at Vabrette) (19th century). The church contains two items that are registered as historical objects:
  - A Chasuble (18th century)
  - A Chasuble (18th century)
- The House of Chestnuts
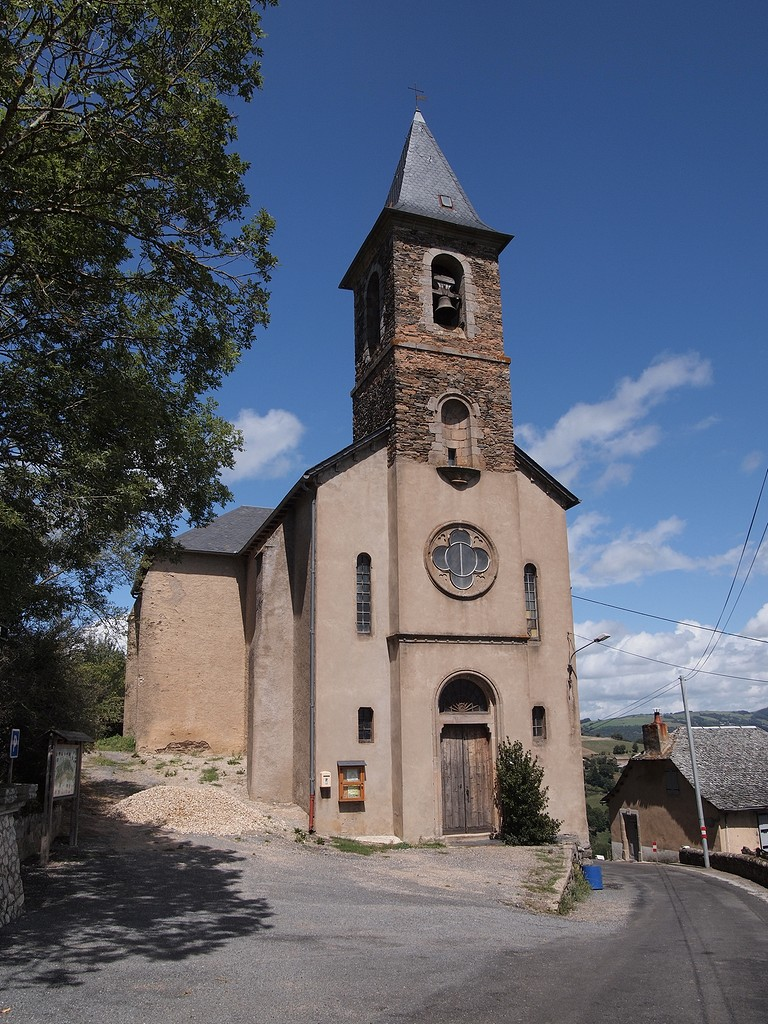
Church of St-Rémy.

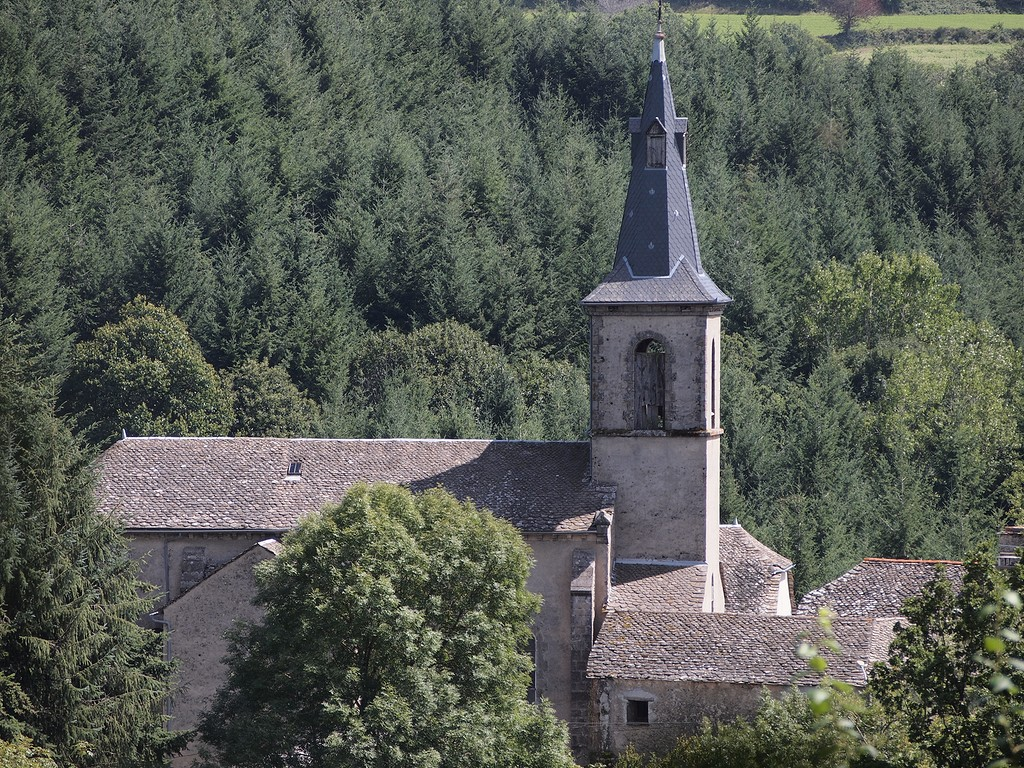
Church of Saint-Amans.

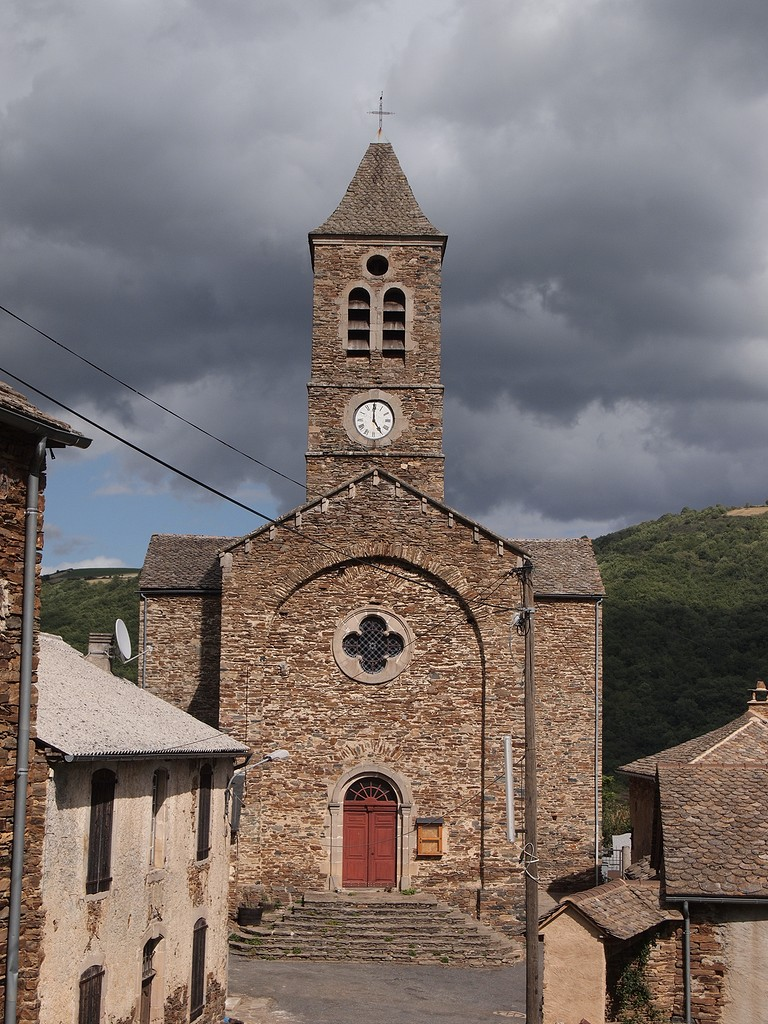
Church of Saint-Blaise.

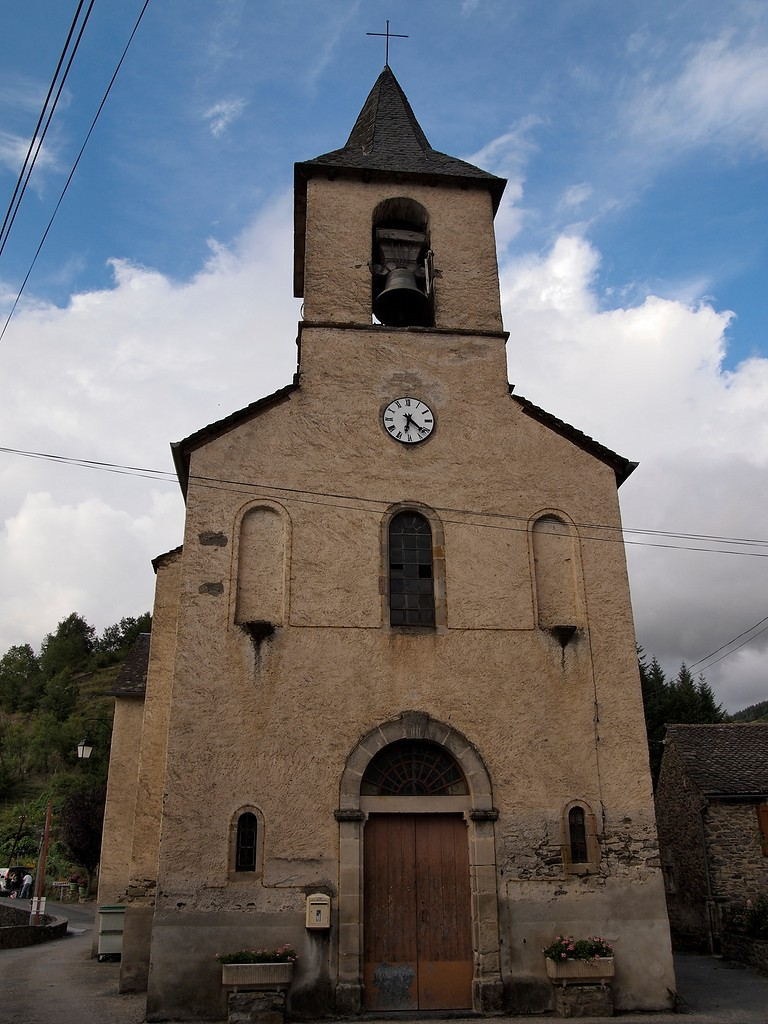
Church of the Nativity of Mary.

== Notable people linked to the commune ==
- Antoine Salvanh (1479-1555). Architect specialising in religious buildings, builder of the bell tower on Rodez Cathedral between 1513 and 1526.
- Guillaume Molinier-Lamothe (1736-1794). Refractory priest jailed in 1793 in Rodez then deported to the Fort du Hâ at Bordeaux the following year where he died.
- Georges Connes (1890-1974). Senior lecturer at the University of Dijon, Doctor of Literature, Dean of the University of Dijon in 1946 and 1947, resistance fighter in 1943, Mayor of Dijon after the liberation of the city in September 1944.
- Pierre-Damien Hèbles (1864-1954). Priest for Ayssènes from 1903 to 1944, member of the literary society of Aveyron, historian for the Raspes du Tarn region. He wrote three manuscripts on local history after 40 years of research in the departmental archives and deeds.
- Gaston Boulouis (1908-1991) Priest, Professor of Literature at the Seminary Minor of Saint Pierre and at the Sainte Marie de Rodez Institution. Canon, historian and occitan scholar at the end of his life. He published several historical books on the region as well as an autobiography and a collection of Occitan proverbs.
- Alain Marc (born in 1957). Politician, Municipal councillor for Ayssènes from 2001 to 2004, he has been MP for Aveyron since 2007.

== See also ==
- Communes of the Aveyron department

=== Bibliography ===
- Christian-Pierre Bedel, preface by Alain Marc, Sant-Roma, Aissenas, Broquièrs, Brossa, Las Còstas, L'Estrada, Sant-Victor, Lo Truèlh / Christian-Pierre Bedel e los estatjants del canton de Sant-Roma, Rodez, Departmental Mission for culture, 1995, Al canton collection, 239 pages, ill., cov. ill., 28 cm, ISBN 2-907279-20-3, ISSN 1151-8375, BnF 366885722 (in Occitan and French)
