= Charles Bauchal =

French historian (1814–1888)

Joseph Charles Bauchal (1 January 1814 – 8 September 1888) was a French architectural historian. He produced several works, such as an important biographical dictionary of French architects which is still often cited by specialists in the field.

== Life ==
He was born in Paris and served as a civil servant in France's Caisse des dépôts et consignations, entering it in 1841 and rising to sous-chef de bureau in 1861 and chef de bureau seven years later. He was head of the army endowment office when he was made a knight of the Legion d'honneur in 1874. He died in the military hospital of Val-de-Grâce in the 5th arrondissement of Paris in 1888.

== Works ==
- Nouveau dictionnaire biographique et critique des architectes français (in French) (1 ed.). Paris: André, Daly fils & Cie. 1887. OCLC 665158649.
- Le Louvre et les Tuileries : précis historique et critique de la construction de ces palais jusqu'au commencement du XIXe siècle, A. Morel, 1882.
