= Canton of Lot et Palanges =

Coordinates: 44.46°N 2.97°E

- Canton
- Situation of the canton of Lot et Palanges in the department of Aveyron
- Country: France
- Region: Occitania
- Department: Aveyron
- No. of communes: {{{nbcomm}}}
- Population (2023): 10,318
- INSEE code: 1209

The canton of Lot et Palanges is an administrative division of the Aveyron department, southern France. It was created at the French canton reorganisation which came into effect in March 2015. Its seat is in Saint-Geniez-d'Olt-et-d'Aubrac.

It consists of the following communes:

1. Bertholène
2. Castelnau-de-Mandailles
3. Gaillac-d'Aveyron
4. Laissac-Sévérac-l'Église
5. Lassouts
6. Palmas-d'Aveyron
7. Pierrefiche
8. Pomayrols
9. Prades-d'Aubrac
10. Saint-Côme-d'Olt
11. Sainte-Eulalie-d'Olt
12. Saint-Geniez-d'Olt-et-d'Aubrac
13. Vimenet
