= Departmental Council of Aveyron =

Departmental legislature in France

Departmental Council of Aveyron Conseil départemental de l'Aveyron

Leadership
- President: Arnaud Viala, LR since 27 June 2021

Structure
- Seats: 46
- Political groups: Government (34): DVD (19); LR (10); UDI (4); PR (1); Opposition (12): DVG (7); Ind (2); PRG (1); PS (1); PR (1); www.aveyron.fr

The Departmental Council of Aveyron (French: Conseil départemental de l'Aveyron, Occitan: Conselh departamental d'Avairon) is the deliberative assembly of the French department of Aveyron. It is chaired by Arnaud Viala.

== Vice-presidents ==
The president of the departmental council is supported by 10 vice-presidents chosen from among the departmental councillors. Each of them has a delegation of authority.

List of vice-presidents of the Aveyron Departmental Council (as of 2021)
Order	Name	Party	Canton	Delegation
1st	André At	UD	Aveyron et Tarn	Budget and roads
2nd	Magali Bessaou	DVD	Causse-Comtal	Youth and education
3rd	Jean-Philippe Sadoul	UDI	Nord-Lévezou	Employment
4th	Gisèle Rigal	DVD	Villeneuvois et Villefranchois	Old age and disability
5th	Christophe Laborie	UDI	Causses-Rougiers	Sustainable development
6th	Christine Presne	DVD	Lot et Palanges	Culture
7th	Christian Naudan	DVD	Lot et Palanges	Agriculture and regional planning
8th	Annie Cazard	DVD	Aubrac et Carladez	Children and families
9th	Jean-Philippe Abinal	UDI	Rodez-Onet	Human resources
10th	Emilie Saules	DVD	Rodez-2	Calls for tenders committee
