= Arques, Aveyron =

Commune in Occitanie, France

Arques
- Commune
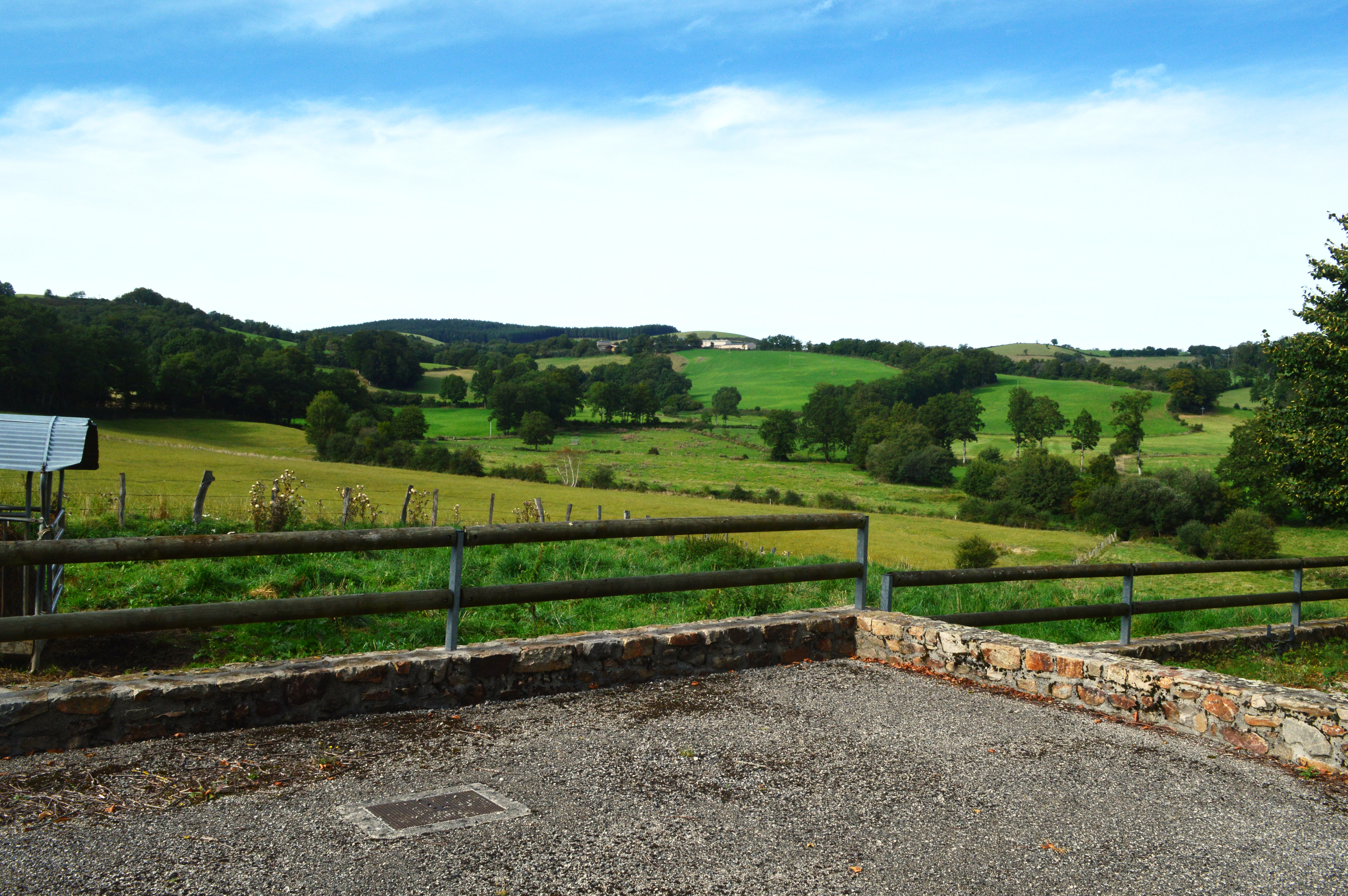
- A general view of Arques
- Location of Arques
- Location within France Location within Occitanie
- Coordinates: 44°19′05″N 2°48′05″E
- Country: France
- Region: Occitania
- Department: Aveyron
- Arrondissement: Millau
- Canton: Raspes et Lévezou
- Intercommunality: Pays de Salars

Government
  - Mayor (2023–2026): Delphine Allié
- Area^{1}: 11.29 km^{2} (4.36 sq mi)
- Elevation: 800 m (2,600 ft)
- Highest elevation: 947 m (3,107 ft)
- Lowest elevation: 714 m (2,343 ft)
- Population (2023): 159
  - Density: 14.1/km^{2} (36.5/sq mi)
- Time zone: UTC+01:00 (CET)
  - Summer (DST): UTC+02:00 (CEST)
- INSEE/Postal code: 12010 /12290
- ^{1} French Land Register data, which excludes lakes, ponds, glaciers > 1 km^{2} (0.386 sq mi or 247 acres) and river estuaries.

Arques (French pronunciation: [aʁk]; Occitan: Arcas) is a commune in the Aveyron department in the Occitanie region of southern France.

== Geography ==
Arques is located some 16 km east by south-east of Rodez and 6 km south of Laissac. Access to the commune is by road D29 from Agen-d'Aveyron in the north-west passing through the commune and the village and continuing south-east to Ségur. Apart from the village there are the hamlets of Le Mazet in the eastern arm of the commune and Moulin Fabre and Recoules south of the village. Except for two forests in the north the commune is entirely farmland.

The Ruisseau des Gardies rises in the north of the commune and flows south through the village joining the Viaur south of the village. The Ruisseau de Clauverhes rises in the north-east of the commune and flows south-east to join the Viaur south of the village. The Viaur river flows from the south-west through the southern part of the commune and forming part of the southern border before continuing west to the Barrage of Pont-de-Salars then continuing west to eventually join the Aveyron river at Saint-Martin-Laguépie.

== Toponymy ==
The word Arques derives from the Latin arx meaning "fortress".

== History ==
The lordship of Arques extended over the Palanges mountains and included the current commune of the same name plus two enclaves currently in the communes of Segur and Vézins-de-Lévézou. Arques is mentioned in a donation to the Abbey of Conques in 1079. It was later attached to the Abbey of La Chaise-Dieu. It was a dependency of the Lordship of Montrozier, under the Count of Rodez, then of the king.

== Administration ==
List of Successive Mayors

Mayors from the French Revolution to 1935

| From | To | Name | Party | Position |
|---|---|---|---|---|
| 1792 | 1793 | Jean Clusel | | |
| 1793 | 1796 | Laurens Carrie | | |
| 1796 | 1800 | François Routaboul | | |
| 1800 | 1805 | Jean-Louis Fabre | | |
| 1805 | 1836 | Jean Clusel | | |
| 1836 | 1837 | Firmin Carrie | | |
| 1837 | 1847 | Jean Victor Clusel | | |
| 1847 | 1848 | Pierre François Gineste | | |
| 1848 | 1870 | Basile Gineste | | |
| 1870 | 1876 | Louis Poujade | | |
| 1876 | 1892 | Henri Marican | | |
| 1892 | 1900 | Casimir Fabre | | |
| 1900 | 1904 | Henri Marican | | |
| 1904 | 1916 | Basile Gineste | | |
| 1916 | 1919 | Joseph Amans | | |
| 1919 | 1935 | Marty Bru | | |

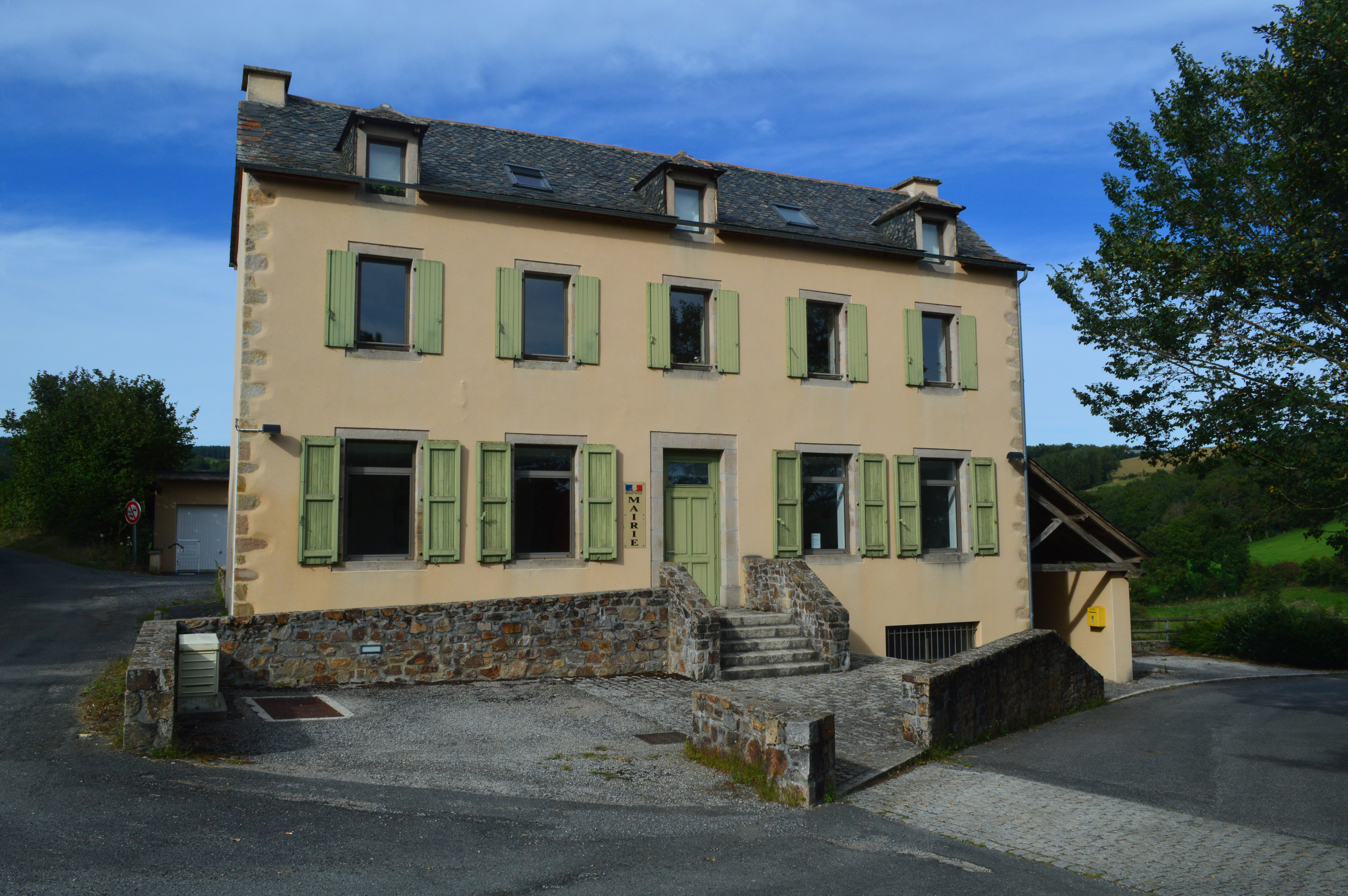
The Town Hall

Mayors from 1935

| From | To | Name | Party |
|---|---|---|---|
| 1935 | 1965 | Joseph Amans | |
| 1965 | 1976 | Albert Gineste | |
| 1976 | 1977 | Guy Gineste | |
| 1977 | 2022 | Bernard Andrieu | UMP then LR |
| 2023 | 2026 | Delphine Allié | |

== Population ==
The inhabitants of the commune are known as Arcasois or Arcasoises in French.

Historical population
| Year | Pop. | ±% p.a. |
|---|---|---|
| 1968 | 166 | — |
| 1975 | 147 | −1.72% |
| 1982 | 121 | −2.74% |
| 1990 | 136 | +1.47% |
| 1999 | 123 | −1.11% |
| 2007 | 128 | +0.50% |
| 2012 | 120 | −1.28% |
| 2017 | 135 | +2.38% |
| 2023 | 159 | +2.76% |
Source: INSEE

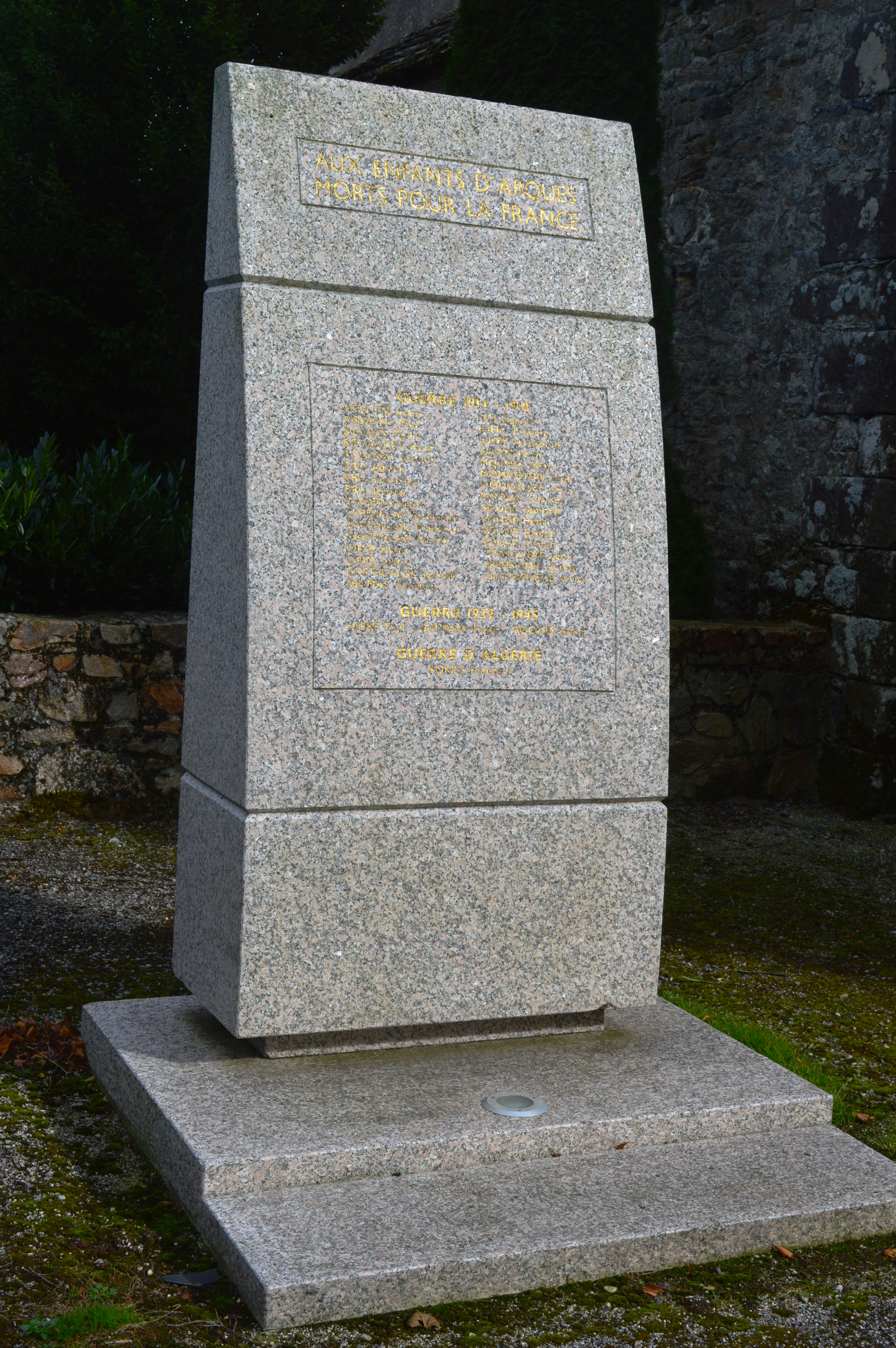
Arques War Memorial

== Sites and Monuments ==
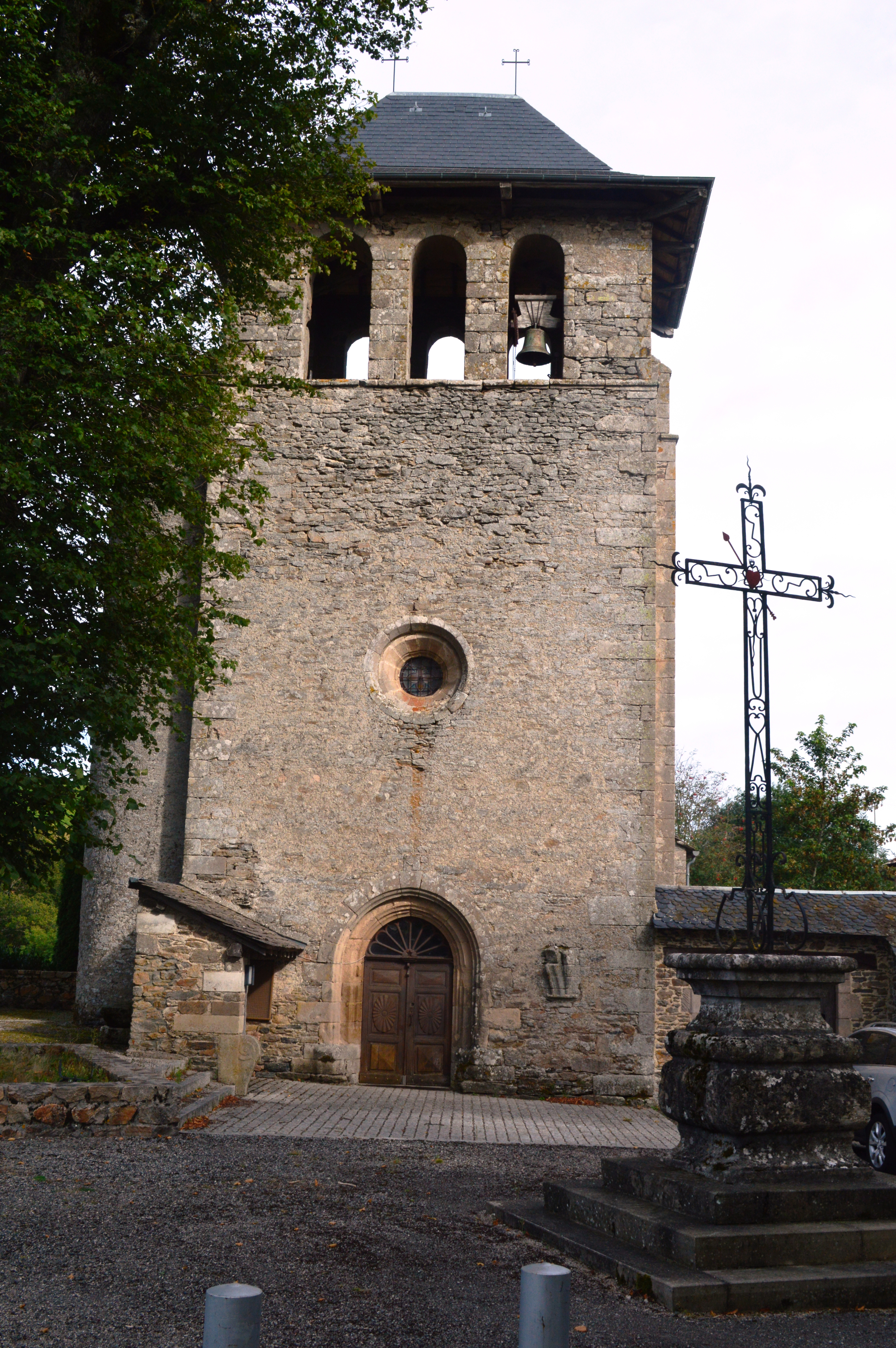
The Church Tower with the Bronze Bell

- A Parish Church from the 16th century, a Bell-gable, and an altarpiece from the 17th century - gilded in the 18th century. A Bronze Bell (1755) is registered as a historical monument.
- The Rives Viaur, a hilly site at the end of Lake Pont-de-Salars.

== See also ==
- Communes of the Aveyron department

== Bibliography ==
- Christian-Pierre Bedel (preface, Alain Pichon), Lo Pònt : Agenh, Arcas, Canet, Flavinh, Pradas, Tremolhas, Lo Vibal / Christian-Pierre Bedel e los estatjants del canton del Pònt, Rodez, Departmental Mission for culture, coll. "Al Canton", 1995, ill., cover ill.; 28 cm, 239 p. (ISBN 978-2-907279-20-8, ISSN 1151-8375, Notice BnF No. FRBNF36688567g) (Occitan/French)
