= Arques =

Arques may refer to the following places in France:

- Arques, Aude, in the Aude department
- Arques, Aveyron, in the Aveyron department
- Arques, Pas-de-Calais, in the Pas-de-Calais department
- Arques-la-Bataille, in the Seine-Maritime department, along the Arques River
  - Battle of Arques (1589)
- Arques (river), a river in the Seine-Maritime department of northern France
- Arques, a German company later known as Gigaset
