= Sébastien David =

French politician

Member of the National Assembly for Aveyron's 3rd constituency
- In office 1 August 2021 – 14 September 2021
- Preceded by: Arnaud Viala
- Succeeded by: Jean-François Rousset

Personal details
- Born: 27 June 1976 (age 50) Saint-Affrique, Aveyron, France
- Party: The Republicans
- Education: École des ingénieurs de la Ville de Paris

Sébastien David (born 27 June 1976) is a French politician. He became Member of Parliament for the Aveyron's 3rd constituency on 1 August 2021, following the resignation of Arnaud Viala, who became president of the Departmental Council of Aveyron. He resigned from Parliament on 13 September 2021 to return as Mayor of Saint-Affrique.

In the 2021 The Republicans congress, he backed Xavier Bertrand in the 1st round, then gave his support in the 2nd round to Valérie Pécresse.
