= Luc-la-Primaube =

Commune in Occitanie, France

- Commune
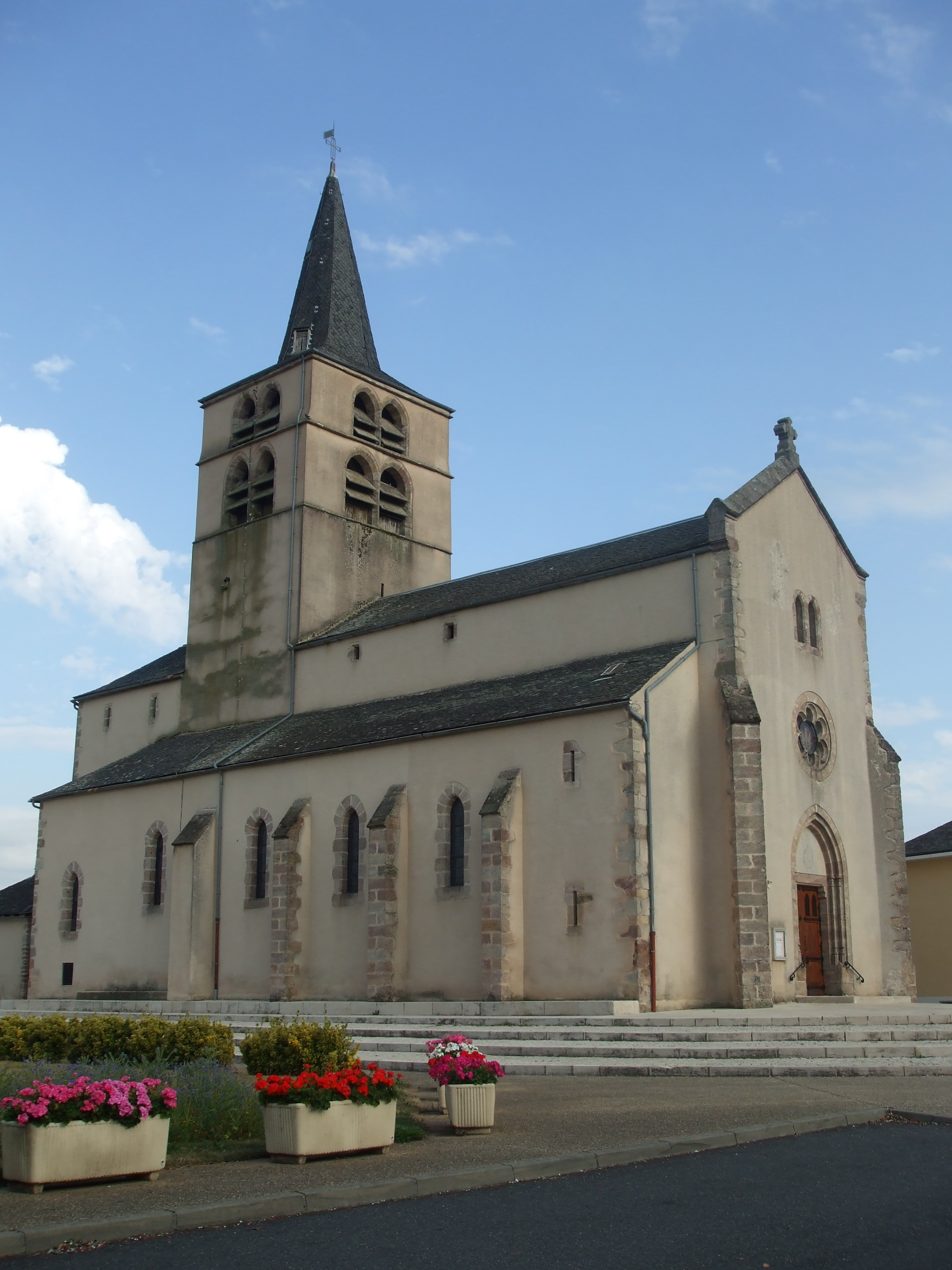
- The church in Luc-la-Primaube
- Location of Luc-la-Primaube
- Location within France Location within Occitanie
- Coordinates: 44°18′53″N 2°32′09″E
- Country: France
- Region: Occitania
- Department: Aveyron
- Arrondissement: Rodez
- Canton: Nord-Lévezou
- Intercommunality: Rodez Agglomération

Government
  - Mayor (2020–2026): Jean-Philippe Sadoul (UDI)
- Area^{1}: 26.85 km^{2} (10.37 sq mi)
- Elevation: 630 m (2,070 ft)
- Highest elevation: 740 m (2,430 ft)
- Lowest elevation: 514 m (1,686 ft)
- Population (2023): 6,046
  - Density: 225.2/km^{2} (583.2/sq mi)
- Time zone: UTC+01:00 (CET)
  - Summer (DST): UTC+02:00 (CEST)
- INSEE/Postal code: 12133 /12450
- ^{1} French Land Register data, which excludes lakes, ponds, glaciers > 1 km^{2} (0.386 sq mi or 247 acres) and river estuaries.

Luc-la-Primaube (French pronunciation: [lyk la pʁimob]; Occitan: Luc) is a commune in the Aveyron department in southern France, in Occitanie, 10 kilometres south of Rodez. Its inhabitants are called Lucois or Primaubois, after the two towns in the commune, Luc and La Primaube, which are 3 km (1.9 mi) apart.

== Commune name ==
Luc-la-Primaube was called Luc until September 12, 2005, when it was officially renamed.

== Geography ==
Luc is a small town where the commune's town hall is located. La Primaube is a commercial small town built on flat ground, without river or hill, which has a church with a bell-tower, and a commercial area with fountains. Luc-Primaube station has rail connections to Toulouse and Rodez.

== History ==
The history of Luc-la-Primaube is related to the old parish of Capelle Saint-Martin, which was formerly under the domination of the abbey of Bonnecombe. The relic of Saint-Martin once brought many people to the parish to cure the disease known as "worms". Today the relic is located at the Sainte-Anne old people's home.

== Population ==
Historical population

Year	Pop.	±% p.a.
1793	611	—
1800	631	+0.46%
1831	1,023	+1.57%
1836	1,025	+0.04%
1841	1,056	+0.60%
1846	1,093	+0.69%
1851	1,114	+0.38%
1856	1,160	+0.81%
1861	1,176	+0.27%
1866	1,171	−0.09%
1872	1,154	−0.24%
1876	1,170	+0.34%
1881	1,166	−0.07%
1886	1,241	+1.25%
1891	1,294	+0.84%
1896	1,315	+0.32%
1901	1,369	+0.81%
1906	1,398	+0.42%

Year	Pop.	±% p.a.
1911	1,399	+0.01%
1921	1,319	−0.59%
1926	1,305	−0.21%
1931	1,330	+0.38%
1936	1,410	+1.18%
1946	1,241	−1.27%
1954	1,238	−0.03%
1962	1,428	+1.80%
1968	1,864	+4.54%
1975	2,613	+4.94%
1982	3,674	+4.99%
1990	4,036	+1.18%
1999	4,717	+1.75%
2007	5,417	+1.74%
2012	5,767	+1.26%
2017	5,969	+0.69%
2023	6,046	+0.21%

Source: EHESS and INSEE (1968-2023)

== See also ==
- Communes of the Aveyron department
