= Flavin, Aveyron =

Commune in Occitanie, France

Flavin
- Commune
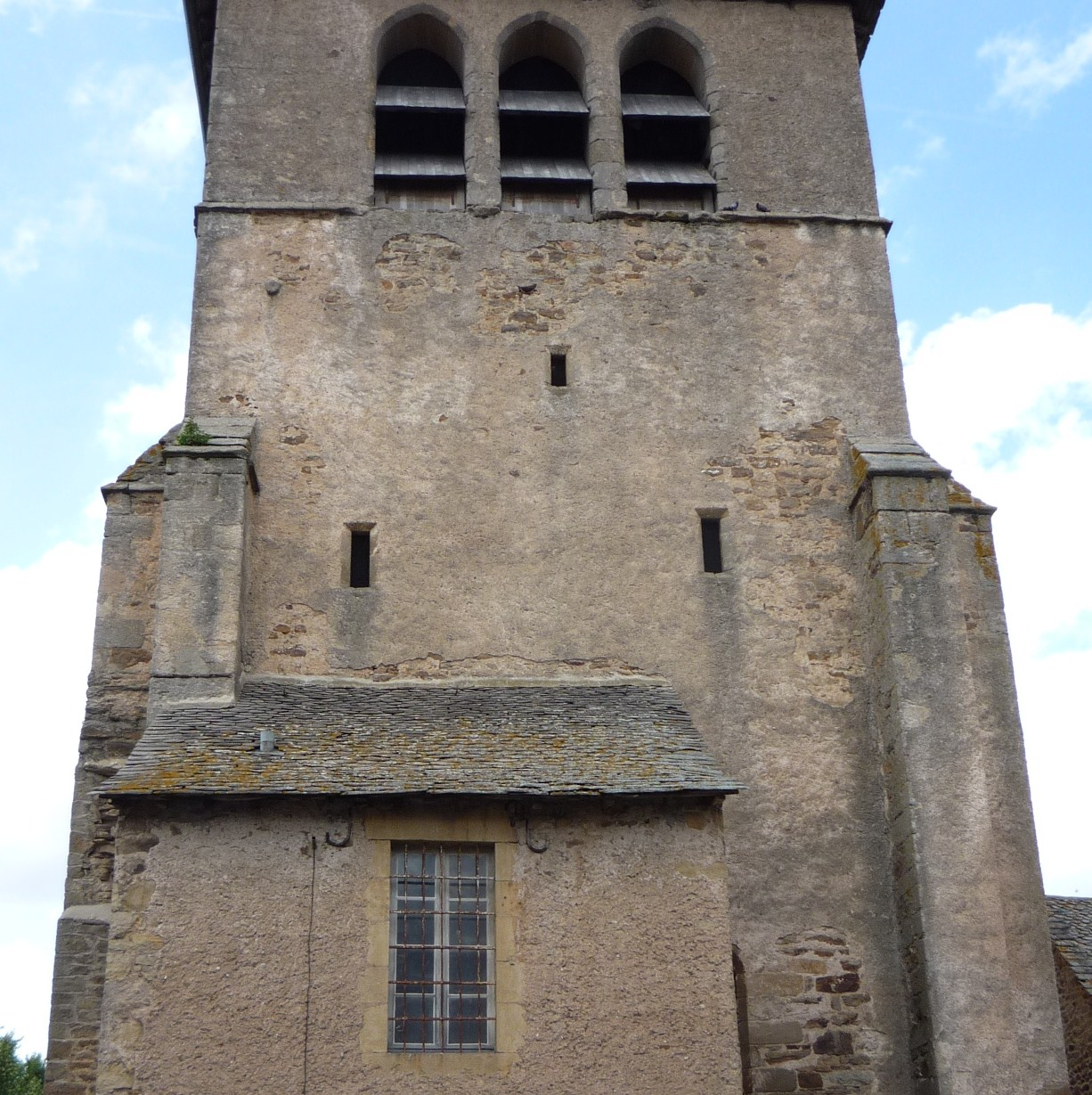
- The church in Flavin
- Location of Flavin
- Location within France Location within Occitanie
- Coordinates: 44°17′23″N 2°36′25″E
- Country: France
- Region: Occitania
- Department: Aveyron
- Arrondissement: Millau
- Canton: Nord-Lévezou
- Intercommunality: Pays de Salars

Government
  - Mayor (2020–2026): Hervé Costes
- Area^{1}: 50.81 km^{2} (19.62 sq mi)
- Elevation: 615 m (2,018 ft)
- Highest elevation: 844 m (2,769 ft)
- Lowest elevation: 513 m (1,683 ft)
- Population (2023): 2,392
  - Density: 47.08/km^{2} (121.9/sq mi)
- Time zone: UTC+01:00 (CET)
  - Summer (DST): UTC+02:00 (CEST)
- INSEE/Postal code: 12102 /12450
- ^{1} French Land Register data, which excludes lakes, ponds, glaciers > 1 km^{2} (0.386 sq mi or 247 acres) and river estuaries.

Flavin (French pronunciation: [flavɛ̃]; Occitan: Flavinh) is a commune in the Aveyron department in southern France.

== Population ==
Historical population
Year	Pop.	±% p.a.
1968	1,118	—
1975	1,167	+0.61%
1982	1,626	+4.85%
1990	1,827	+1.47%
1999	1,936	+0.65%
2007	2,172	+1.45%
2012	2,268	+0.87%
2017	2,322	+0.47%
2023	2,392	+0.50%
Source: INSEE

== See also ==
- Communes of the Aveyron department
