= Gabriac, Aveyron =

Commune in Occitanie, France

Gabriac
- Commune
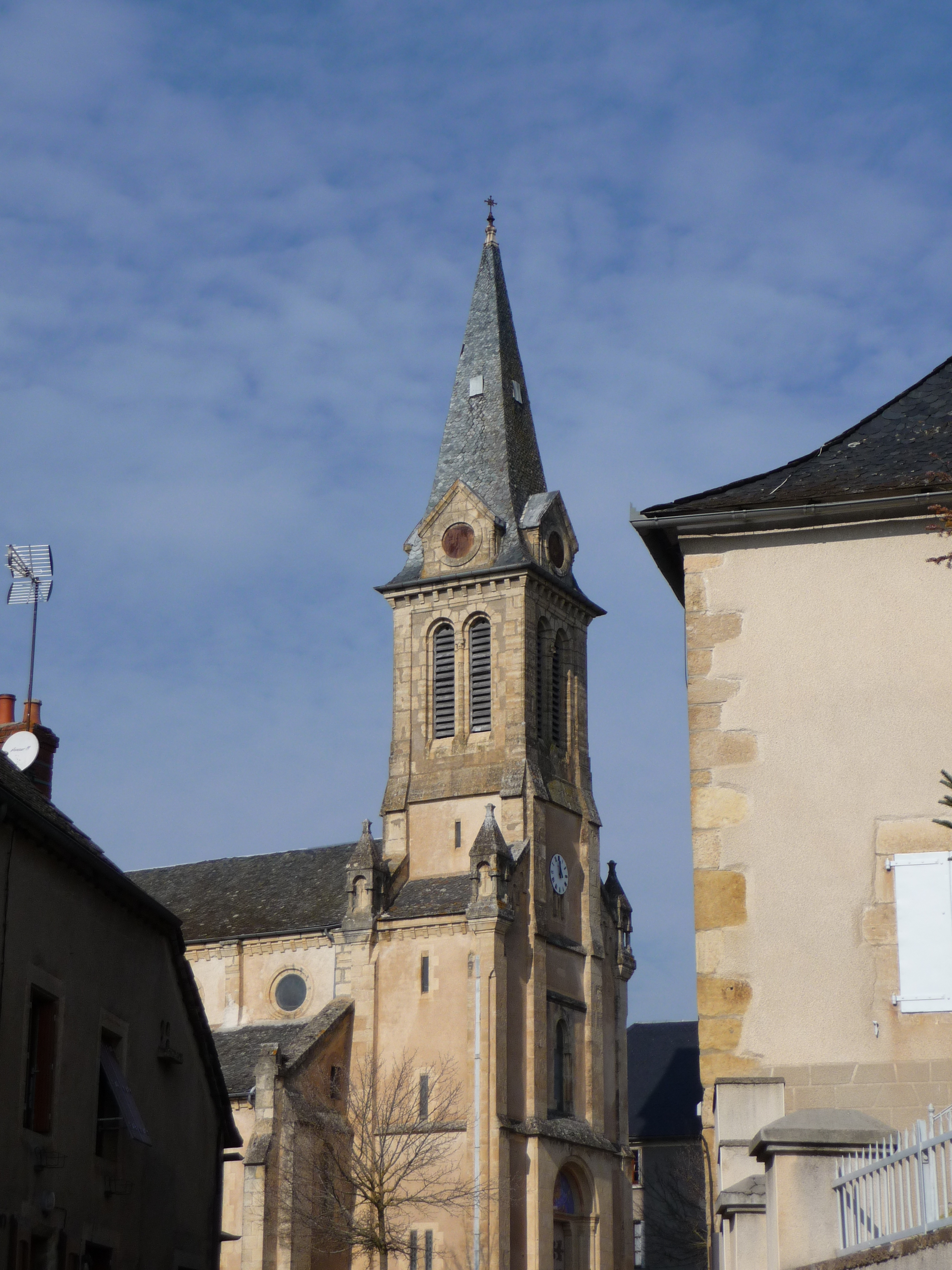
- The church of Saint-Jean

- Coat of arms
- Location of Gabriac
- Location within France Location within Occitanie
- Coordinates: 44°27′09″N 2°47′41″E
- Country: France
- Region: Occitania
- Department: Aveyron
- Arrondissement: Rodez
- Canton: Causse-Comtal
- Intercommunality: Comtal Lot et Truyère

Government
  - Mayor (2020–2026): Nicolas Bessière
- Area^{1}: 25.54 km^{2} (9.86 sq mi)
- Elevation: 575 m (1,886 ft)
- Highest elevation: 808 m (2,651 ft)
- Lowest elevation: 533 m (1,749 ft)
- Population (2023): 561
  - Density: 22.0/km^{2} (56.9/sq mi)
- Time zone: UTC+01:00 (CET)
  - Summer (DST): UTC+02:00 (CEST)
- INSEE/Postal code: 12106 /12340
- ^{1} French Land Register data, which excludes lakes, ponds, glaciers > 1 km^{2} (0.386 sq mi or 247 acres) and river estuaries.

Gabriac (French pronunciation: [ɡabʁijak]; Occitan: Gabriac) is a commune in the southern French department of Aveyron.

== Population ==
Historical population
Year	Pop.	±% p.a.
1968	518	—
1975	470	−1.38%
1982	416	−1.73%
1990	403	−0.40%
1999	446	+1.13%
2007	431	−0.43%
2012	501	+3.06%
2017	504	+0.12%
2023	561	+1.80%
Source: INSEE

== See also ==
- Communes of the Aveyron department
