= Sainte-Radegonde, Aveyron =

Commune in Occitanie, France

Sainte-Radegonde
- Commune
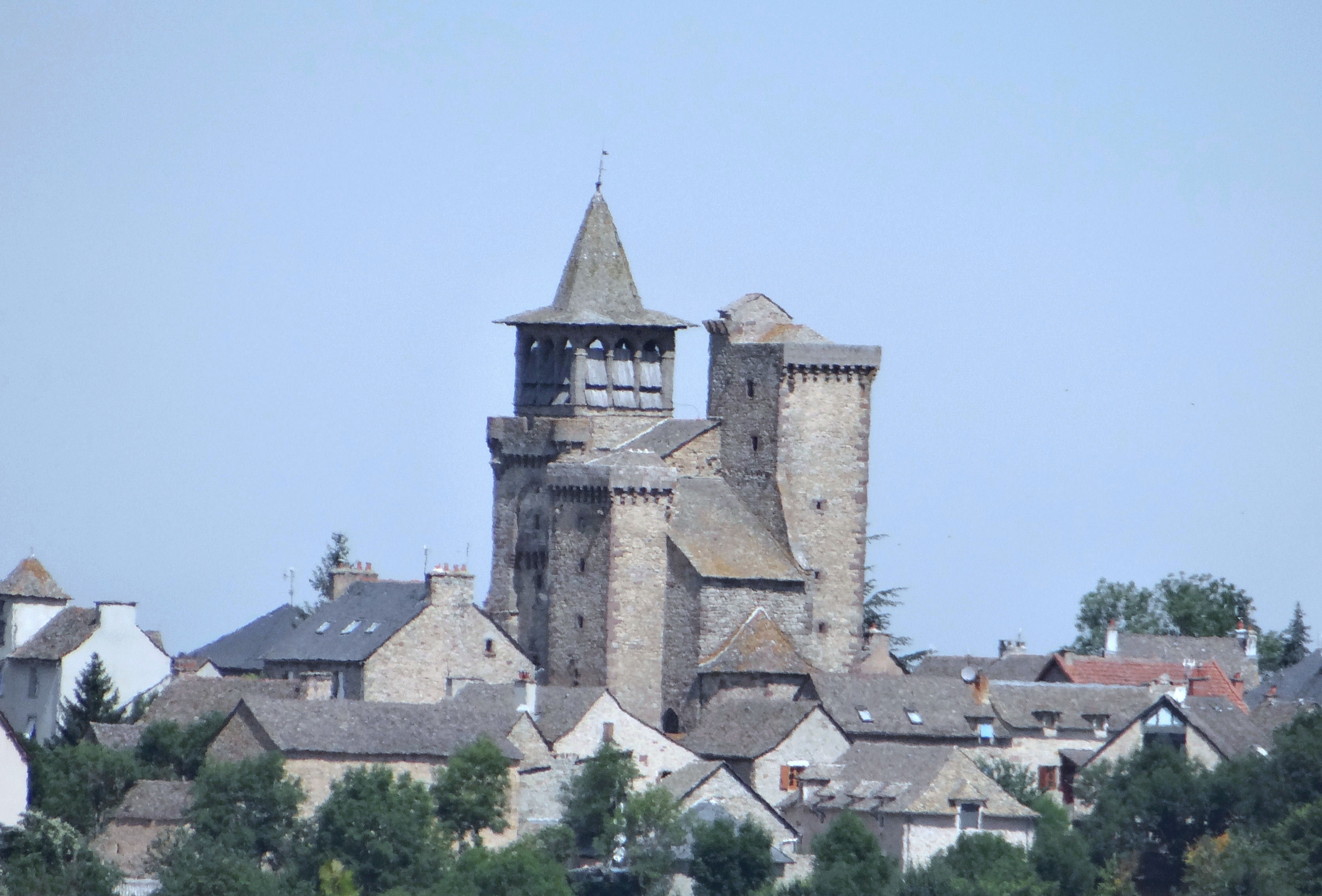
- The village of Sainte-Radegonde, with the fortified church

- Coat of arms
- Location of Sainte-Radegonde
- Location within France Location within Occitanie
- Coordinates: 44°20′12″N 2°37′38″E
- Country: France
- Region: Occitania
- Department: Aveyron
- Arrondissement: Rodez
- Canton: Nord-Lévezou
- Intercommunality: Rodez Agglomération

Government
  - Mayor (2020–2026): Laurence Pagès-Touzé
- Area^{1}: 30.48 km^{2} (11.77 sq mi)
- Elevation: 535 m (1,755 ft)
- Highest elevation: 791 m (2,595 ft)
- Lowest elevation: 526 m (1,726 ft)
- Population (2023): 1,793
  - Density: 58.83/km^{2} (152.4/sq mi)
- Time zone: UTC+01:00 (CET)
  - Summer (DST): UTC+02:00 (CEST)
- INSEE/Postal code: 12241 /12850
- ^{1} French Land Register data, which excludes lakes, ponds, glaciers > 1 km^{2} (0.386 sq mi or 247 acres) and river estuaries.

Sainte-Radegonde (French pronunciation: [sɛ̃t ʁadɡɔ̃d]; Languedocien: Senta Radegonda) is a commune in the Aveyron department in Occitania in southern France.

== Population ==
Historical population
Year	Pop.	±% p.a.
1968	452	—
1975	553	+2.92%
1982	1,027	+9.25%
1990	1,226	+2.24%
1999	1,355	+1.12%
2007	1,561	+1.78%
2012	1,707	+1.80%
2017	1,756	+0.57%
2023	1,793	+0.35%
Source: INSEE

== See also ==
- Communes of the Aveyron department
