= Olemps =

Commune in Occitanie, France

- Commune
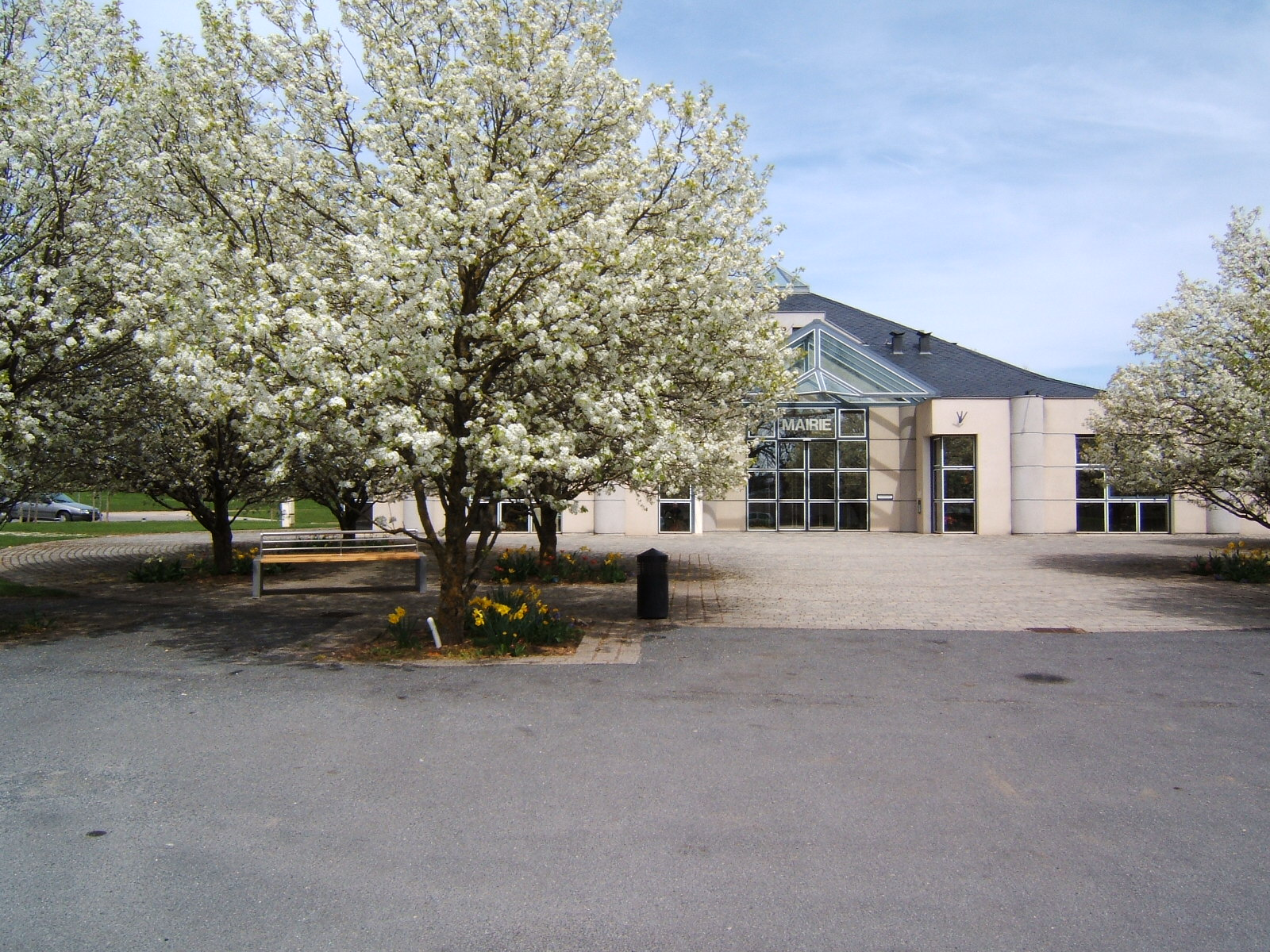
- Town hall
- Location of Olemps
- Location within France Location within Occitanie
- Coordinates: 44°20′50″N 2°33′13″E
- Country: France
- Region: Occitania
- Department: Aveyron
- Arrondissement: Rodez
- Canton: Nord-Lévezou
- Intercommunality: Rodez Agglomération

Government
  - Mayor (2020–2026): Sylvie Lopez
- Area^{1}: 12.79 km^{2} (4.94 sq mi)
- Elevation: 600 m (2,000 ft)
- Highest elevation: 639 m (2,096 ft)
- Lowest elevation: 490 m (1,610 ft)
- Population (2023): 3,559
  - Density: 278.3/km^{2} (720.7/sq mi)
- Time zone: UTC+01:00 (CET)
  - Summer (DST): UTC+02:00 (CEST)
- INSEE/Postal code: 12174 /12510
- ^{1} French Land Register data, which excludes lakes, ponds, glaciers > 1 km^{2} (0.386 sq mi or 247 acres) and river estuaries.

Olemps (French pronunciation: [olɛ̃ps]; Occitan: Olemps) is a commune in the Aveyron department in southern France.

== Population ==
Historical population

Year	Pop.	±% p.a.
1793	435	—
1800	495	+1.86%
1841	683	+0.79%
1846	688	+0.15%
1851	695	+0.20%
1856	645	−1.48%
1861	661	+0.49%
1866	674	+0.39%
1872	650	−0.60%
1876	676	+0.99%
1881	653	−0.69%
1886	707	+1.60%
1891	649	−1.70%
1896	881	+6.30%
1901	771	−2.63%
1906	751	−0.52%
1911	722	−0.78%

Year	Pop.	±% p.a.
1921	633	−1.31%
1926	652	+0.59%
1931	659	+0.21%
1936	716	+1.67%
1946	1,378	+6.77%
1954	1,500	+1.07%
1962	2,018	+3.78%
1968	2,201	+1.46%
1975	2,562	+2.19%
1982	2,856	+1.56%
1990	3,032	+0.75%
1999	3,020	−0.04%
2007	3,149	+0.52%
2012	3,247	+0.61%
2017	3,403	+0.94%
2023	3,559	+0.75%

Source: EHESS and INSEE (1968-2023)

== See also ==
- Communes of the Aveyron department
