= Rodez Agglomération =

Coordinates: 44°20′N 02°35′E

- Communauté d'agglomération
- Country: France
- Region: Occitania
- Department: Aveyron
- No. of communes: {{{nbcomm}}}
- Established: 1999
- Area: 205.3 km^{2} (79.3 sq mi)
- Population (2019): 56,080
  - Density: 273.2/km^{2} (707.5/sq mi)
- Website: www.rodezagglo.fr

Rodez Agglomération is the communauté d'agglomération, an intercommunal structure, centred on the city of Rodez. It is located in the Aveyron department, in the Occitanie region, southern France. Created in 1999, its seat is in Rodez. Its area is 205.3 km^{2}. Its population was 56,080 in 2019, of which 24,475 in Rodez proper.

== Composition ==
The communauté d'agglomération consists of the following 8 communes:

1. Druelle Balsac
2. Luc-la-Primaube
3. Le Monastère
4. Olemps
5. Onet-le-Château
6. Rodez
7. Sainte-Radegonde
8. Sébazac-Concourès
