= La Loubière =

Commune in Occitanie, France

- Commune
- Location of La Loubière
- Location within France Location within Occitanie
- Coordinates: 44°24′23″N 2°37′52″E
- Country: France
- Region: Occitania
- Department: Aveyron
- Arrondissement: Rodez
- Canton: Causse-Comtal

Government
  - Mayor (2020–2026): Magali Bessaou
- Area^{1}: 28.71 km^{2} (11.08 sq mi)
- Elevation: 555 m (1,821 ft)
- Highest elevation: 691 m (2,267 ft)
- Lowest elevation: 526 m (1,726 ft)
- Population (2023): 1,573
  - Density: 54.79/km^{2} (141.9/sq mi)
- Time zone: UTC+01:00 (CET)
  - Summer (DST): UTC+02:00 (CEST)
- INSEE/Postal code: 12131 /12740
- ^{1} French Land Register data, which excludes lakes, ponds, glaciers > 1 km^{2} (0.386 sq mi or 247 acres) and river estuaries.

La Loubière (French pronunciation: [la lubjɛʁ]; Occitan: La Lobièra) is a commune in the Aveyron department in southern France.

== Population ==
Historical population
Year	Pop.	±% p.a.
1968	402	—
1975	568	+5.06%
1982	878	+6.42%
1990	1,011	+1.78%
1999	1,174	+1.67%
2007	1,336	+1.63%
2012	1,457	+1.75%
2017	1,472	+0.21%
2023	1,573	+1.11%
Source: INSEE

== See also ==
- Communes of the Aveyron department
