= Alain Marc =

French politician

Member of the French Senate for Aveyron
- Incumbent
- Assumed office 1 October 2014

Member of the National Assembly for Aveyron's 3rd constituency
- In office 20 June 2007 – 30 September 2014
- Preceded by: Jacques Godfrain
- Succeeded by: Arnaud Viala

Personal details
- Born: 29 January 1957 (age 68); Paris, France
- Political party: Radical Party

Alain Marc (born 29 January 1957) is a member of the French Senate, who represents the department of Aveyron.

He was elected to the Senate on 28 September 2014. Marc served in the National Assembly of France from 2007 to 2014, representing the third constituency of the Aveyron department, as a member of the Radical Party.
