= Arnaud Viala =

French politician

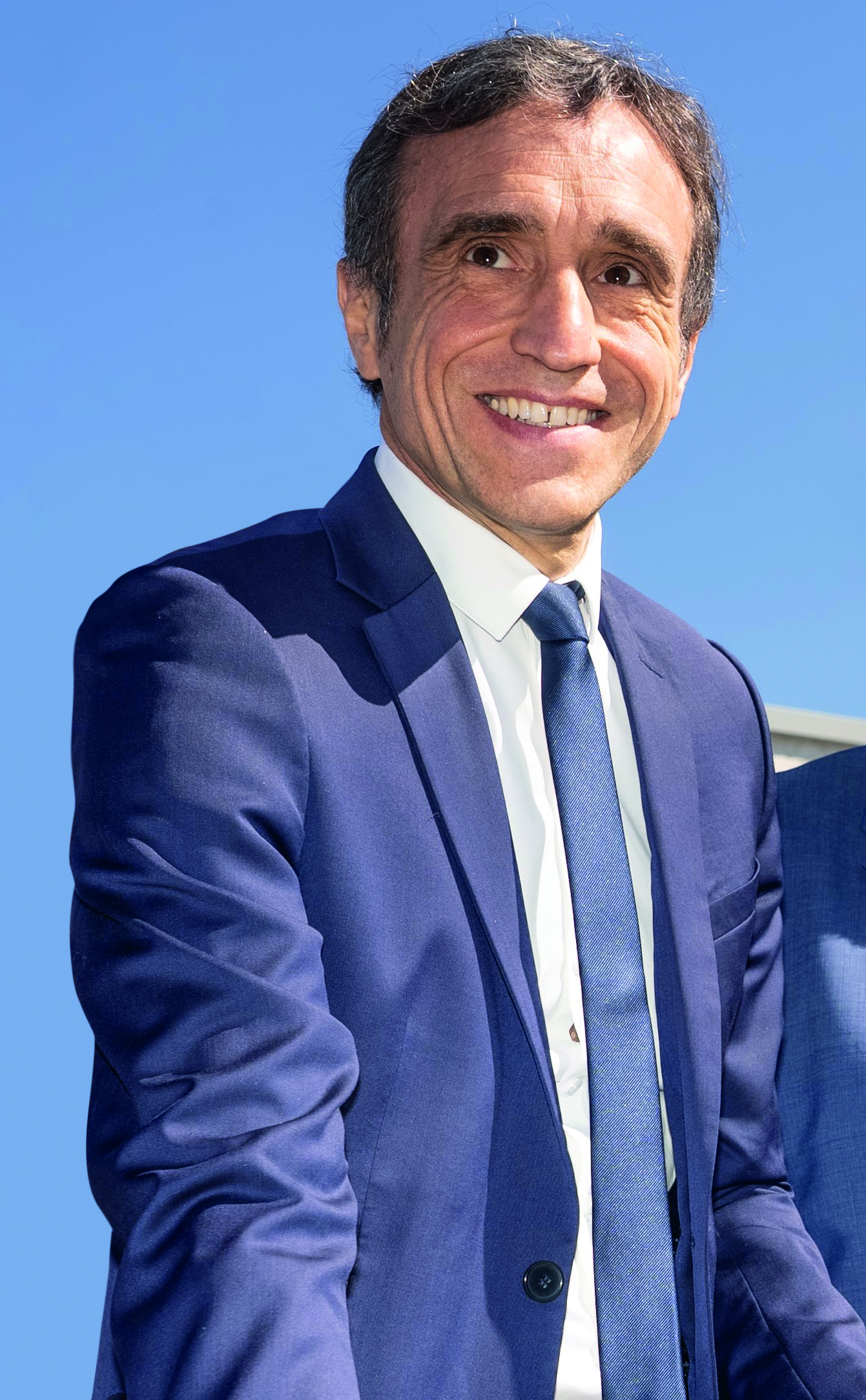

Member of the National Assembly for Aveyron's 3rd constituency
- In office 14 September 2015 – 31 July 2021
- Preceded by: Alain Marc
- Succeeded by: Sébastien David

Personal details
- Born: 4 December 1974 (age 51) Millau, France
- Party: The Republicans

Arnaud Viala (born 4 December 1974) is a French politician of the Republicans who was Member of Parliament for the Aveyron's 3rd constituency in the French National Assembly from 2015 to 2021.

== Political career ==
In Parliament, Viala serves on the Committee on Legal Affairs. In addition to his committee assignments, he is a member of the French Parliamentary Friendship Groups with Central America and Central Asia.

In the Republicans' 2016 presidential primaries, Viala endorsed Alain Juppé as the party's candidate for the office of President of France. In the Republicans' 2017 leadership election, he endorsed Laurent Wauquiez.

In 2021 he resigned from parliament to become president of the Departmental Council of Aveyron.

== See also ==
- 2017 French legislative election
