= Le Monastère =

Commune in Occitanie, France

- Commune
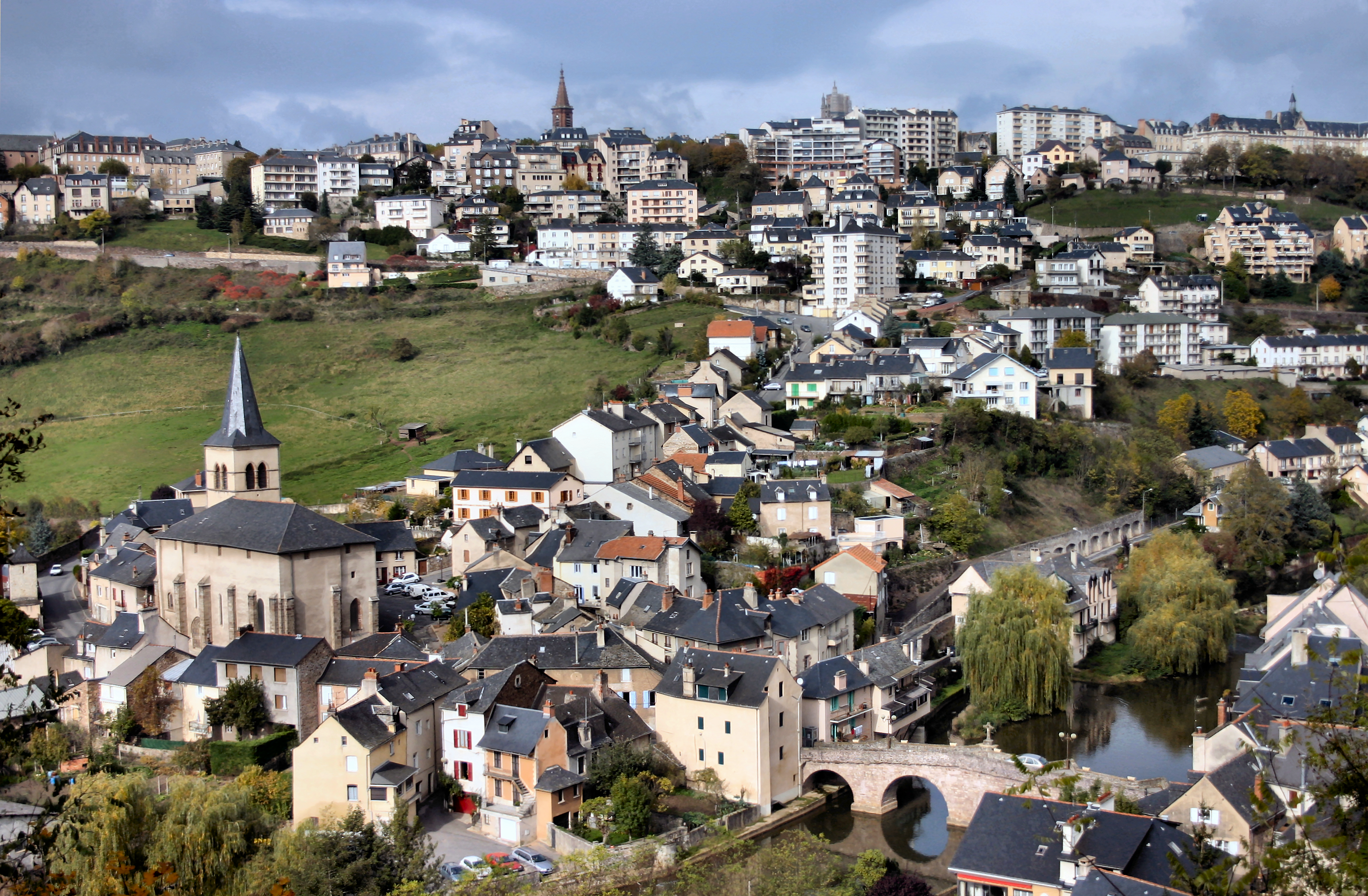
- A general view of Le Monastère
- Location of Le Monastère
- Location within France Location within Occitanie
- Coordinates: 44°20′37″N 2°34′45″E
- Country: France
- Region: Occitania
- Department: Aveyron
- Arrondissement: Rodez
- Canton: Rodez-2
- Intercommunality: Rodez Agglomération

Government
  - Mayor (2020–2026): Jacques Montoya
- Area^{1}: 6.73 km^{2} (2.60 sq mi)
- Elevation: 558 m (1,831 ft)
- Highest elevation: 648 m (2,126 ft)
- Lowest elevation: 519 m (1,703 ft)
- Population (2023): 2,295
  - Density: 341/km^{2} (883/sq mi)
- Time zone: UTC+01:00 (CET)
  - Summer (DST): UTC+02:00 (CEST)
- INSEE/Postal code: 12146 /12000
- ^{1} French Land Register data, which excludes lakes, ponds, glaciers > 1 km^{2} (0.386 sq mi or 247 acres) and river estuaries.

Le Monastère (French pronunciation: [lə mɔnastɛʁ]; Occitan: Lo Monestire) is a commune in the Aveyron department in southern France.

== Population ==
Historical population
Year	Pop.	±% p.a.
1968	937	—
1975	1,201	+3.61%
1982	1,256	+0.64%
1990	1,579	+2.90%
1999	1,809	+1.52%
2007	2,095	+1.85%
2012	2,104	+0.09%
2017	2,283	+1.65%
2023	2,295	+0.09%
Source: INSEE

== See also ==
- Communes of the Aveyron department
