= Rodelle =

Commune in Occitanie, France

- Commune
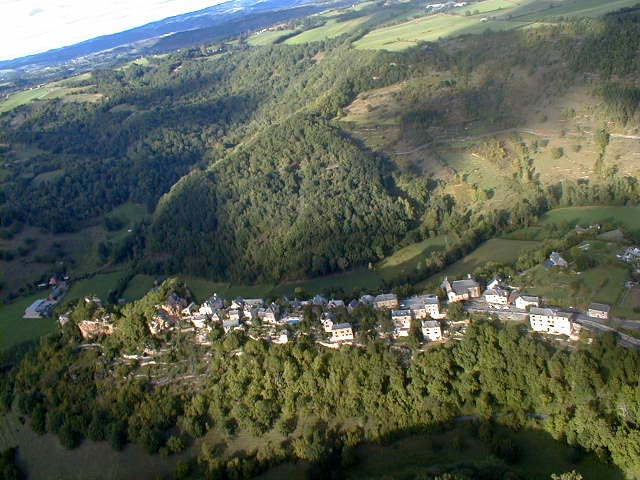
- A general view of Rodelle

- Coat of arms
- Location of Rodelle
- Location within France Location within Occitanie
- Coordinates: 44°29′29″N 2°37′38″E
- Country: France
- Region: Occitania
- Department: Aveyron
- Arrondissement: Rodez
- Canton: Causse-Comtal

Government
  - Mayor (2020–2026): Jean-Michel Lalle
- Area^{1}: 53.43 km^{2} (20.63 sq mi)
- Highest elevation: 606 m (1,988 ft)
- Lowest elevation: 320 m (1,050 ft)
- Population (2023): 1,122
  - Density: 21.00/km^{2} (54.39/sq mi)
- Time zone: UTC+01:00 (CET)
  - Summer (DST): UTC+02:00 (CEST)
- INSEE/Postal code: 12201 /12340
- ^{1} French Land Register data, which excludes lakes, ponds, glaciers > 1 km^{2} (0.386 sq mi or 247 acres) and river estuaries.

Rodelle (French pronunciation: [ʁɔdɛl]; Occitan: Rodesla) is a commune in the Aveyron department in southern France.

== See also ==
- Communes of the Aveyron department
