= Onet-le-Château =

Commune in Occitanie, France

Onet-le-Château Ònes (Occitan)
- Commune
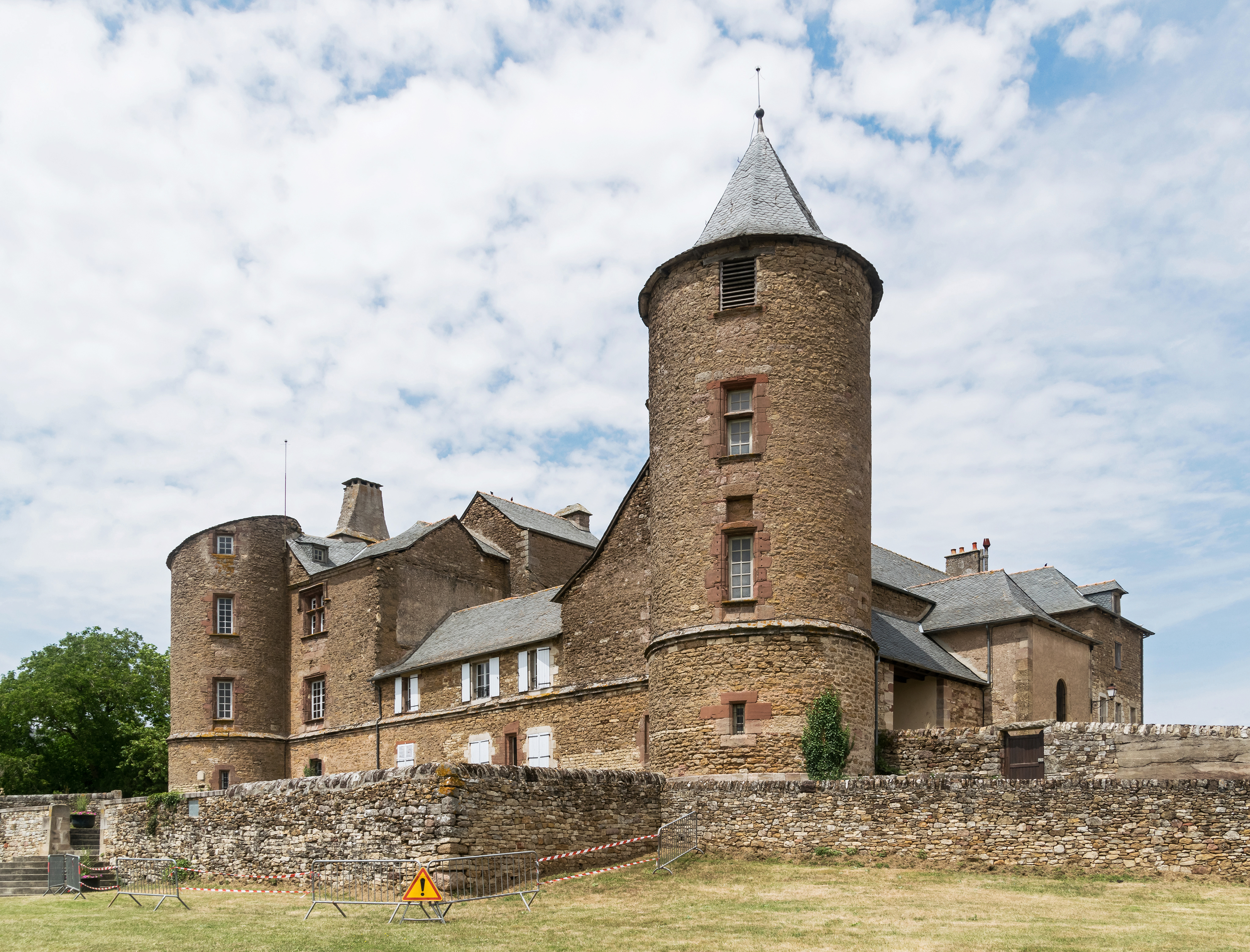
- Castle of Onet-le-Château
- Location of Onet-le-Château
- Location within France Location within Occitanie
- Coordinates: 44°21′59″N 2°35′39″E
- Country: France
- Region: Occitania
- Department: Aveyron
- Arrondissement: Rodez
- Canton: Rodez-Onet
- Intercommunality: Rodez Agglomération

Government
  - Mayor (2020–2026): Jean-Philippe Kéroslian
- Area^{1}: 40.2 km^{2} (15.5 sq mi)
- Elevation: 500 m (1,600 ft)
- Highest elevation: 631 m (2,070 ft)
- Lowest elevation: 524 m (1,719 ft)
- Population (2023): 12,080
  - Density: 300/km^{2} (778/sq mi)
- Time zone: UTC+01:00 (CET)
  - Summer (DST): UTC+02:00 (CEST)
- INSEE/Postal code: 12176 /12850
- ^{1} French Land Register data, which excludes lakes, ponds, glaciers > 1 km^{2} (0.386 sq mi or 247 acres) and river estuaries.

Onet-le-Château (French: [ɔnɛ l(ə) ʃɑto]; Occitan: Ònes) is a commune in the Aveyron department in southern France.

== Population ==
Historical population

| Year | Pop. | ±% p.a. |
|---|---|---|
| 1793 | 103 | — |
| 1800 | 106 | +0.41% |
| 1806 | 1,397 | +53.69% |
| 1821 | 1,408 | +0.05% |
| 1831 | 1,398 | −0.07% |
| 1836 | 1,265 | −1.98% |
| 1841 | 867 | −7.28% |
| 1846 | 941 | +1.65% |
| 1851 | 954 | +0.27% |
| 1856 | 988 | +0.70% |
| 1861 | 998 | +0.20% |
| 1866 | 916 | −1.70% |
| 1872 | 936 | +0.36% |
| 1876 | 1,057 | +3.09% |
| 1881 | 987 | −1.36% |
| 1886 | 1,030 | +0.86% |
| 1891 | 1,026 | −0.08% |
| 1896 | 944 | −1.65% |
| 1901 | 952 | +0.17% |

| Year | Pop. | ±% p.a. |
|---|---|---|
| 1906 | 953 | +0.02% |
| 1911 | 1,015 | +1.27% |
| 1921 | 984 | −0.31% |
| 1926 | 995 | +0.22% |
| 1931 | 1,002 | +0.14% |
| 1936 | 967 | −0.71% |
| 1946 | 1,060 | +0.92% |
| 1954 | 1,158 | +1.11% |
| 1962 | 1,515 | +3.42% |
| 1968 | 4,741 | +20.94% |
| 1975 | 6,391 | +4.36% |
| 1982 | 9,473 | +5.78% |
| 1990 | 9,705 | +0.30% |
| 1999 | 9,922 | +0.25% |
| 2007 | 10,423 | +0.62% |
| 2012 | 11,070 | +1.21% |
| 2017 | 11,881 | +1.42% |
| 2023 | 12,080 | +0.28% |

Source: EHESS and INSEE (1968-2023)

== See also ==
- Communes of the Aveyron department
