= Sébazac-Concourès =

Commune in Occitanie, France

- Commune
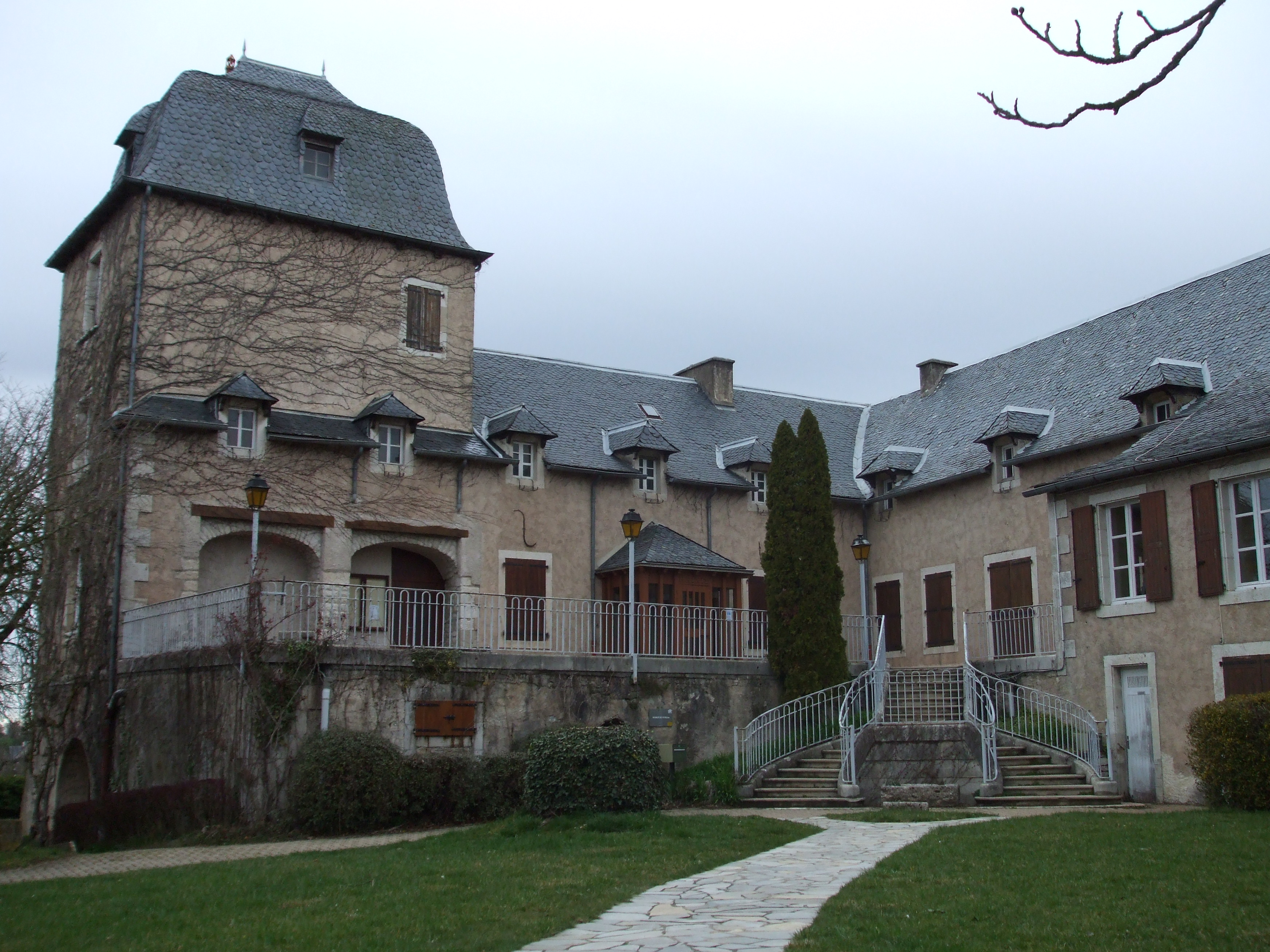
- Town hall
- Location of Sébazac-Concourès
- Location within France Location within Occitanie
- Coordinates: 44°24′14″N 2°36′02″E
- Country: France
- Region: Occitania
- Department: Aveyron
- Arrondissement: Rodez
- Canton: Causse-Comtal
- Intercommunality: Rodez Agglomération

Government
  - Mayor (2020–2026): Florence Cayla
- Area^{1}: 25.82 km^{2} (9.97 sq mi)
- Elevation: 612 m (2,008 ft)
- Highest elevation: 625 m (2,051 ft)
- Lowest elevation: 553 m (1,814 ft)
- Population (2023): 3,234
  - Density: 125.3/km^{2} (324.4/sq mi)
- Time zone: UTC+01:00 (CET)
  - Summer (DST): UTC+02:00 (CEST)
- INSEE/Postal code: 12264 /12740
- ^{1} French Land Register data, which excludes lakes, ponds, glaciers > 1 km^{2} (0.386 sq mi or 247 acres) and river estuaries.

Sébazac-Concourès (French pronunciation: [sebazak kɔ̃kuʁɛs]; Occitan: Sebasac Competicions) is a commune in the Aveyron department in southern France.

== Population ==
Historical population
Year	Pop.	±% p.a.
1968	642	—
1975	1,727	+15.18%
1982	2,336	+4.41%
1990	2,703	+1.84%
1999	2,717	+0.06%
2007	2,941	+1.00%
2012	3,146	+1.36%
2017	3,253	+0.67%
2023	3,234	−0.10%
Source: INSEE

== See also ==
- Communes of the Aveyron department
