= Aveyron's 3rd constituency =

Constituency of the National Assembly of France

3rd constituency of the Aveyron
- inline Constituency of the National Assembly of France

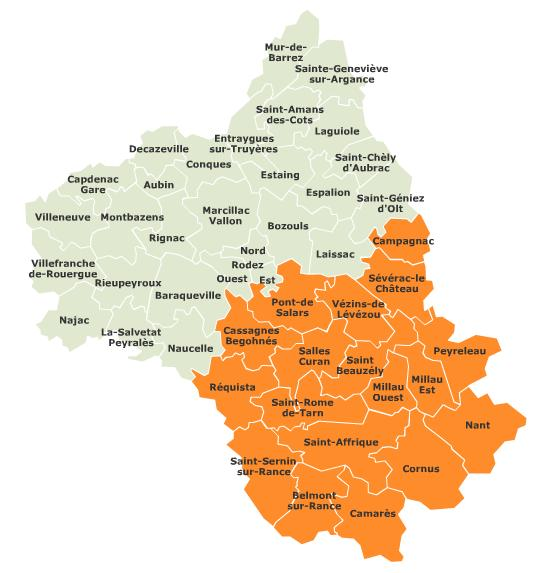
- Constituency in department

- Aveyron in France
- Deputy: Jean-François Rousset; RE
- Department: Aveyron
- Cantons: Belmont-sur-Rance, Camarès, Campagnac, Cassagnes-Bégonhès, Cornus, Millau Est, Millau Ouest, Nant, Peyreleau, Pont-de-Salars, Réquista, Saint-Affrique, Saint-Beauzély, Saint-Rome-de-Tarn, Saint-Sernin-sur-Rance, Salles-Curan, Sévérac-le-Château, Vézins-de-Lévézou

The 3rd constituency of the Aveyron is a French legislative constituency in the Aveyron département.

== Deputies ==
Election	Member	Party
1958	Charles Dutheil	MRP
1962	Roger Julien	MRP
1967	Louis Delmas	UDR
1968	Louis Delmas	UDR
1973	Jean Gabriac	UDR
1978	Jacques Godfrain	RPR
1981	Jacques Godfrain	RPR
1986	Proportional representation - no election by constituency	
1988	Jacques Godfrain	RPR
1993	Jacques Godfrain	RPR
1997	Jacques Godfrain	RPR
2002	Jacques Godfrain	UMP
2007	Alain Marc	UMP
2012	Alain Marc	UMP
2015	Arnaud Viala	UMP
2017	Arnaud Viala	LR
2021	Sébastien David	LR
2022	Jean-François Rousset	LREM
2024	Jean-François Rousset	RE

== Election results ==
=== 2024 ===
Candidate	Party	Alliance	First round			Second round		
Candidate	Party	Alliance	Votes	%	+/–	Votes	%	+/–
Pierre-Antoine Fevre	LR-RN	UXD	18,044	35.46	new	19,561	39.71	new
Jean-François Rousset	RE	Ensemble	16,514	32.45	+7.30	29,696	60.29	+6.59
Richard Bouigue	PS	NFP	14,660	28.81	+1.72	withdrew		
Thierry Noël	ECO		1,066	2.09	+2.09			
Bernard Combes	LO		607	1.19	-0.08			
Votes			50,891	100.00		49,257	100.00	
Valid votes			50,891	95.70	-0.72	49,257	92.91	+3.84
Blank votes			1,481	2.79	+0.41	2,573	4.85	-2.14
Null votes			804	1.51	+0.31	1,185	2.24	-1.71
Turnout			53,176	73.58	+18.17	53,015	73.36	+19.05
Abstentions			19,095	26.42	-18.17	19,253	26.64	-19.05
Registered voters			72,271			72,268		
Result			RE HOLD					

=== 2022 ===
Legislative Election 2022: Aveyron's 3rd constituency
Party	Candidate	Votes	%	±%
LFI (NUPÉS)	Michel Rhin	10,494	27.09	+10.52
LREM (Ensemble)	Jean-François Rousset	9,742	25.15	-7.39
LR (UDC)	Christophe Saint-Pierre	6,818	17.60	−18.42
RN	Jean Christophe Cazorla	6,017	15.53	+6.91
R!	Jean-Marie Daures	2,909	7.51	N/A
REC	Lysiane Tendil	1,300	3.36	N/A
DVE	Patrice Miran	970	2.50	N/A
Others	N/A	492	1.27	
Turnout		38,742	55.41	−2.49
2nd round result
LREM (Ensemble)	Jean-François Rousset	23,138	53.70	+22.99
LFI (NUPÉS)	Michel Rhin	13,113	46.30	N/A
Turnout		36,251	50.79	−4.01
LREM gain from LR				

=== 2017 ===
Candidate	Label	First round		Second round	
Candidate	Label	Votes	%	Votes	%
Arnaud Viala	LR	14,525	36.02	20,934	59.16
Jean-Louis Austruy	LREM	13,122	32.54	14,449	40.84
Catherine Laur	LFI	5,124	12.71		
Muriel Abriac	FN	3,476	8.62		
Sophie Tarroux	PCF	1,556	3.86		
Régina Garcini	DVG	1,062	2.63		
Thierry Noël	ECO	529	1.31		
Henri Temple	DLF	465	1.15		
Bernard Combes	EXG	285	0.71		
Bruno Pacchiele	DIV	178	0.44		
Votes		40,322	100.00	35,383	100.00
Valid votes		40,322	96.95	35,383	89.93
Blank votes		829	1.99	2,668	6.78
Null votes		438	1.05	1,296	3.29
Turnout		41,589	57.90	39,347	54.80
Abstentions		30,238	42.10	32,453	45.20
Registered voters		71,827		71,800	
Source: Ministry of the Interior

=== 2012 ===
Summary of the 10 June and 17 June 2012 French legislative in Aveyron’s 3rd Constituency election results
Candidate	Party		1st round		2nd round	
Candidate	Party		Votes	%	Votes	%
Alain Marc	Union for a Popular Movement	UMP	17,756	38.16%	24,962	53.96%
Marie-Thérèse Foulquier	The Greens	VEC	10,138	21.79%	21,302	46.04%
Béatrice Marre	Miscellaneous Left	DVG	7,213	15.50%		
Marie-Claude Fayard	National Front	FN	3,945	8.48%		
Jean-Luc Pouget	Left Front	FG	2,691	5.78%		
Philippe Ramondenc	Miscellaneous Right	DVD	2,263	4.86%		
Norbert Castelltort	Miscellaneous Right	DVD	1,315	2.83%		
Philippe Dargagnon	Ecologist	ECO	483	1.04%		
Nicolas Bestard	Far Left	EXG	366	0.79%		
Stéphane Cabrol	Regionalist	REG	189	0.41%		
Bernard Combes	Far Left	EXG	174	0.37%		
Total			46,533	100%	46,264	100%
Registered voters			71,920		71,907	
Blank/Void ballots			1,119	2.35%	1,832	3.81%
Turnout			47,652	66.26%	48,096	66.89%
Abstentions			24,268	33.74%	23,811	33.11%
Result					UMP HOLD	

=== 2007 ===
Summary of the 10 June and 17 June 2007 French legislative in Aveyron’s 3rd Constituency election results
Candidate	Party		1st round		2nd round	
Candidate	Party		Votes	%	Votes	%
Alain Marc	Union for a Popular Movement	UMP	23,883	49.50%	27,350	57.67%
Béatrice Marre	Socialist Party	PS	13,032	27.01%	20,071	42.33%
Hugues Robert	Democratic Movement	MoDem	3,028	6.28%		
Inaki Aranceta	Far Left	EXG	1,617	3.35%		
Martine Perez	Communist	COM	1,453	3.01%		
Yves Frémion	The Greens	VEC	1,437	2.98%		
Michel Dorlin	National Front	FN	1,320	2.74%		
Simone Evesque-Heran	Hunting, Fishing, Nature, Traditions	CPNT	1,163	2.41%		
Marie-Joëlle Aubril	Ecologist	ECO	519	1.08%		
Isabelle Marit-Antonin	Divers	DIV	479	0.99%		
Bernard Combes	Far Left	EXG	318	0.66%		
Total			48,249	100%	47,421	100%
Registered voters			72,119		72,114	
Blank/Void ballots			1,344	2.71%	1,977	4.00%
Turnout			49,593	68.77%	49,398	68.50%
Abstentions			22,526	31.23%	22,716	31.50%
Result					UMP HOLD	

=== 2002 ===
Legislative Election 2002: Aveyron's 3rd constituency
Party	Candidate	Votes	%	±%
UMP	Jacques Godfrain	24,403	47.89	+0.84
PS	Alain Fauconnier	13,672	26.83	−0.56
DVD	Rene Quatrefages	3,056	6.00	N/A
FN	Catia Gelly	2,740	5.38	−2.57
CPNT	Bernard Cornus	1,950	3.83	N/A
PCF	Martine Perez	1,197	2.35	−3.55
LV	Beatrice Foulquier	1,133	2.22	−3.12
LCR	Christian Barbut	1,113	2.18	−0.63
Others	N/A	1,696		
Turnout		52,456	74.59	
2nd round result
UMP	Jacques Godfrain	28,993	61.46	+5.29
PS	Alain Fauconnier	18,184	38.54	−5.29
Turnout		49,390	70.24	
UMP hold				

=== 1997 ===
Legislative Election 1997: Aveyron's 3rd constituency
Party	Candidate	Votes	%	±%
RPR	Jacques Godfrain	22,872	47.05	
PS	Alain Fauconnier	13,315	27.39	
FN	Gérard Cabillic	3,867	7.95	
PCF	André Perez	2,866	5.90	
LV	Gérard Galtier	2,597	5.34	
LCR	Ginette Marchive	1,368	2.81	
MPF	Auguste Triquet	1,116	2.30	
DIV	François Aycard	612	1.26	
Turnout		52,147	75.39	
2nd round result
RPR	Jacques Godfrain	28,277	56.17	
PS	Alain Fauconnier	22,064	43.83	
Turnout		53,564	77.65	
RPR hold				

== Sources ==
- Official results of French elections from 1998: "Résultats électoraux officiels en France" (in French). Archived from the original on 20 December 2011.
