= Jean-François Rousset =

French politician

Member of the National Assembly for Aveyron's 3rd constituency
- Incumbent
- Assumed office 22 June 2022
- Preceded by: Sébastien David

Personal details
- Born: 9 September 1952 (age 73) Aurillac, France
- Party: Renaissance

Jean-François Rousset (born 9 September 1952) is a French politician of Renaissance who has represented the 3rd constituency of the Aveyron department in the National Assembly since 2022.

A surgeon by occupation, formed in Toulouse, Rousset was elected Deputy Mayor of Montlaur in 2014. In Parliament, he sits on the Committee on Social Affairs.

== See also ==
- List of deputies of the 16th National Assembly of France
