= Ségur, Aveyron =

Commune in Occitanie, France

Ségur
- Commune
- Coat of arms
- Location of Ségur
- Location within France Location within Occitanie
- Coordinates: 44°17′36″N 2°50′07″E
- Country: France
- Region: Occitania
- Department: Aveyron
- Arrondissement: Millau
- Canton: Raspes et Lévezou
- Intercommunality: Lévézou Pareloup

Government
  - Mayor (2020–2026): Gilles Plet
- Area^{1}: 67.05 km^{2} (25.89 sq mi)
- Elevation: 770 m (2,530 ft)
- Highest elevation: 1,005 m (3,297 ft)
- Lowest elevation: 716 m (2,349 ft)
- Population (2023): 534
  - Density: 7.96/km^{2} (20.6/sq mi)
- Time zone: UTC+01:00 (CET)
  - Summer (DST): UTC+02:00 (CEST)
- INSEE/Postal code: 12266 /12290
- ^{1} French Land Register data, which excludes lakes, ponds, glaciers > 1 km^{2} (0.386 sq mi or 247 acres) and river estuaries.

Ségur (French pronunciation: [seɡyʁ]; Occitan: Segur) is a commune in the Aveyron department in southern France. Its inhabitants are the Ségurois, Séguroises.

== Geography ==
Ségur is situated on the D29, the main road connecting the City of Rodez to Millau.

== History ==
With its church perched on a hill and tightly packed houses, the village is well known to fishermen who enjoy Viaur and its banks. Segur is the starting point of a cultural tour with beautiful Romanesque churches and the Sanctuary of Bergounhoux, a place of pilgrimage.

== Population ==
Historical population
Year	Pop.	±% p.a.
1968	896	—
1975	803	−1.55%
1982	738	−1.20%
1990	662	−1.35%
1999	623	−0.67%
2007	591	−0.66%
2012	579	−0.41%
2017	557	−0.77%
2023	534	−0.70%
Source: INSEE

== See also ==
- Communes of the Aveyron department
