= Agen-d'Aveyron =

Commune in Occitanie, France

- Commune
- Coat of arms
- Location of Agen-d'Aveyron
- Location within France Location within Occitanie
- Coordinates: 44°21′28″N 2°40′48″E
- Country: France
- Region: Occitania
- Department: Aveyron
- Arrondissement: Millau
- Canton: Causse-Comtal
- Intercommunality: Pays de Salars

Government
  - Mayor (2020–2026): Laurent de Védelly
- Area^{1}: 22.35 km^{2} (8.63 sq mi)
- Elevation: 550 m (1,800 ft)
- Highest elevation: 863 m (2,831 ft)
- Lowest elevation: 525 m (1,722 ft)
- Population (2023): 1,116
  - Density: 49.93/km^{2} (129.3/sq mi)
- Time zone: UTC+01:00 (CET)
  - Summer (DST): UTC+02:00 (CEST)
- INSEE/Postal code: 12001 /12630
- ^{1} French Land Register data, which excludes lakes, ponds, glaciers > 1 km^{2} (0.386 sq mi or 247 acres) and river estuaries.

Agen-d'Aveyron is a commune in the Aveyron department situated in the Occitanie region in southern France.

It is located 10 km east of Rodez, 15 km west of Laissac and 50 km northwest of Millau.

Agen-d'Aveyron is in the ancient province of Rouergue and is the site of a prehistoric dolmen.

== Population ==
Historical population
Year	Pop.	±% p.a.
1968	565	—
1975	657	+2.18%
1982	724	+1.40%
1990	865	+2.25%
1999	1,012	+1.76%
2007	1,053	+0.50%
2012	1,076	+0.43%
2017	1,051	−0.47%
2023	1,116	+1.01%
Source: INSEE

== See also ==
- Communes of the Aveyron department
