= Montrozier =

Commune in Occitanie, France

- Commune
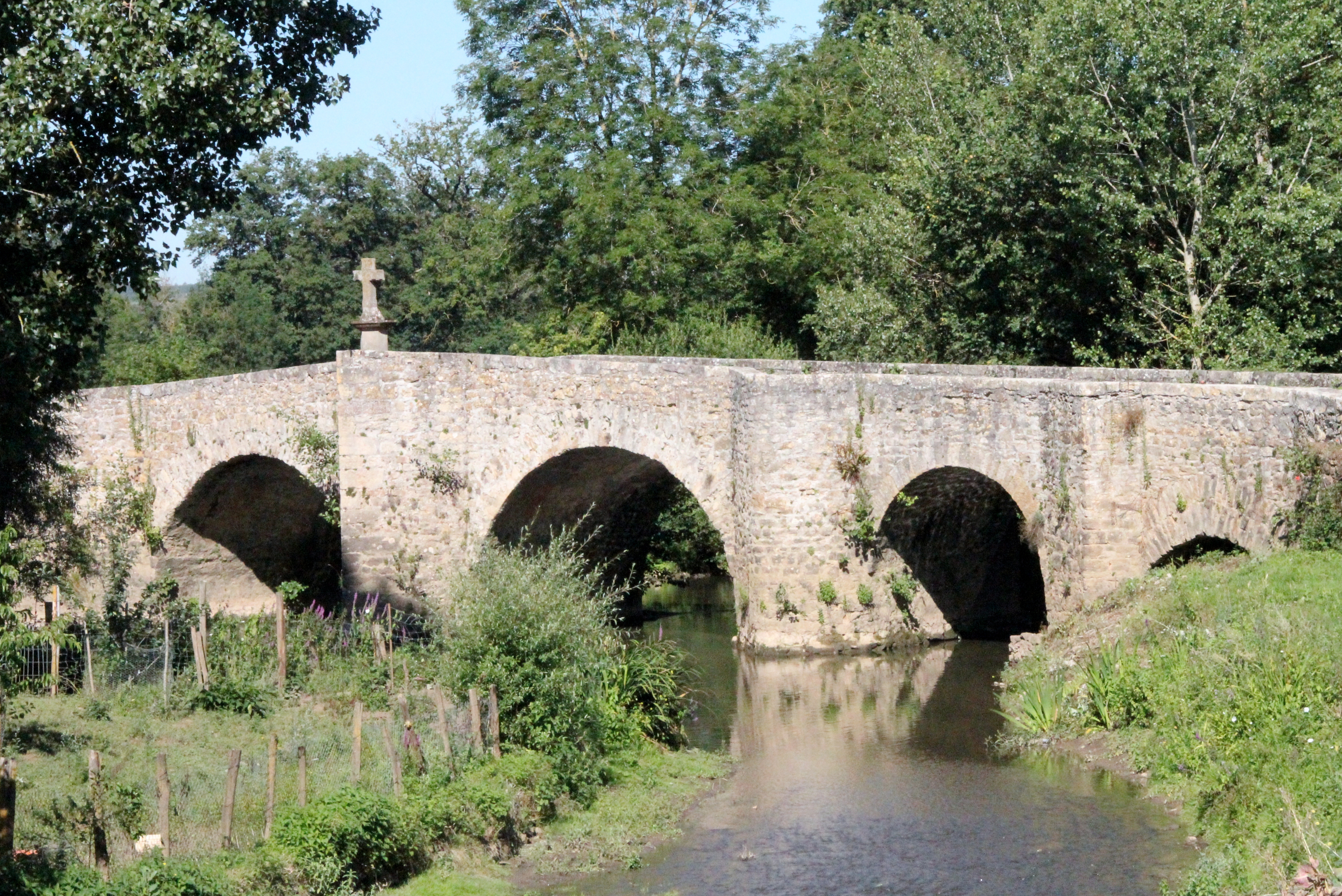
- Bridge over the Aveyron
- Location of Montrozier
- Location within France Location within Occitanie
- Coordinates: 44°23′38″N 2°42′24″E
- Country: France
- Region: Occitania
- Department: Aveyron
- Arrondissement: Rodez
- Canton: Causse-Comtal
- Intercommunality: Comtal Lot et Truyère

Government
  - Mayor (2020–2026): Laurent Gaffard
- Area^{1}: 46.78 km^{2} (18.06 sq mi)
- Elevation: 650 m (2,130 ft)
- Highest elevation: 886 m (2,907 ft)
- Lowest elevation: 538 m (1,765 ft)
- Population (2023): 1,717
  - Density: 36.70/km^{2} (95.06/sq mi)
- Time zone: UTC+01:00 (CET)
  - Summer (DST): UTC+02:00 (CEST)
- INSEE/Postal code: 12157 /12630
- ^{1} French Land Register data, which excludes lakes, ponds, glaciers > 1 km^{2} (0.386 sq mi or 247 acres) and river estuaries.

Montrozier (French pronunciation: [mɔ̃ʁozje]; Occitan: Mont Rosièr) is a commune in the Aveyron department in southern France.

== Population ==
Historical population
Year	Pop.	±% p.a.
1968	942	—
1975	946	+0.06%
1982	1,081	+1.92%
1990	1,210	+1.42%
1999	1,279	+0.62%
2007	1,399	+1.13%
2012	1,495	+1.34%
2017	1,630	+1.74%
2023	1,717	+0.87%
Source: INSEE

== See also ==
- Communes of the Aveyron department
