= Canton of Rodez-Onet =

Coordinates: 44.366°N 2.571°E

- Canton
- Situation of the canton of Rodez-Onet in the department of Aveyron
- Country: France
- Region: Occitania
- Department: Aveyron
- No. of communes: {{{nbcomm}}}
- Population (2023): 14,195
- INSEE code: 1218

The canton of Rodez-Onet is an administrative division of the Aveyron department, southern France. It was created at the French canton reorganisation which came into effect in March 2015. Its seat is in Rodez.

It consists of the following communes:

1. Onet-le-Château
2. Rodez (partly)
