= Canton of Causse-Comtal =

Coordinates: 44.41°N 2.60°E

- Canton
- Situation of the canton of Causse-Comtal in the department of Aveyron
- Country: France
- Region: Occitania
- Department: Aveyron
- No. of communes: {{{nbcomm}}}
- Population (2023): 12,324
- INSEE code: 1203

The canton of Causse-Comtal is an administrative division of the Aveyron department, southern France. It was created at the French canton reorganisation which came into effect in March 2015. Its seat is in Sébazac-Concourès.

It consists of the following communes:

1. Agen-d'Aveyron
2. Bozouls
3. Gabriac
4. La Loubière
5. Montrozier
6. Rodelle
7. Sébazac-Concourès
