= Canton of Nord-Lévezou =

Coordinates: 44.31°N 2.54°E

- Canton
- Situation of the canton of Nord-Lévezou in the department of Aveyron
- Country: France
- Region: Occitania
- Department: Aveyron
- No. of communes: {{{nbcomm}}}
- Population (2023): 13,790
- INSEE code: 1214

The canton of Nord-Lévezou is an administrative division of the Aveyron department, southern France. It was created at the French canton reorganisation which came into effect in March 2015. Its seat is in Luc-la-Primaube.

It consists of the following communes:

1. Flavin
2. Luc-la-Primaube
3. Olemps
4. Sainte-Radegonde
